= List of bridges on the National Register of Historic Places in Iowa =

This is a list of bridges and tunnels on the National Register of Historic Places in the U.S. state of Iowa.

| Name | Image | Built | Listed | Location | County | Type |
|---|---|---|---|---|---|---|
| 280th Street Bridge | | 1898 | 1998-06-25 | Independence; 42°23′6″N 91°56′34″W | Buchanan | Pinned kingpost pony truss |
| Adair Viaduct | | 1923 | 1998-06-25 | Adair; 41°29′56″N 94°38′23″W | Adair | Concrete open spandrel arch |
| Adel Bridge | | 1882 | 2002-04-18 | Adel; 41°36′57″N 94°0′43″W | Dallas | Pratt Through Truss |
| Albright Bridge | | 1907 | 1998-06-25 | Webster City; 42°24′20″N 93°48′36″W | Hamilton | Pinned Pratt through truss |
| Alden Bridge | Alden Bridge | 1936 | 1998-05-15 | Alden; 42°31′16″N 93°22′32″W | Hardin | concrete rigid frame |
| Ames Creek Bridge | | 1912 | 1998-06-25 | De Witt; 41°51′1″N 90°30′36″W | Clinton | Concrete through girder |
| Beaver Creek Bridge | | 1916 | 1998-06-25 | Perry; 41°50′47″N 94°2′53″W | Dallas | Concrete Marsh arch |
| Beaver Creek Bridge | | 1919 | 1998-06-25 | Ogden; 42°2′34″N 94°8′41″W | Boone | Concrete Marsh arch |
| Bellefountain Bridge | | 1898 | 1998-05-15 | Tracy; 41°19′58″N 92°51′56″W | Mahaska | pinned Pratt through truss |
| Berkhimer Bridge | Berkhimer Bridge | 1899 | 1998-05-15 | Humboldt; 42°44′21″N 94°15′11″W | Humboldt | Pennsylvania through truss |
| Bertram Bridge | | 1891 | 1998-05-15 | Bertram; 41°57′23″N 91°31′36″W | Linn | pinned Pratt through truss |
| Big Creek Bridge | | 1916 | 1998-06-25 | Madrid; 41°53′33″N 93°45′1″W | Boone | Concrete Marsh arch |
| Big Creek Bridge 2 | | 1917 | 1998-06-25 | Madrid; 41°53′33″N 93°45′2″W | Boone | Concrete Marsh arch |
| Big Slough Creek Bridge | Big Slough Creek Bridge | 1937 | 1998-05-15 | Nichols; 41°28′38″N 91°20′53″W | Muscatine | concrete rigid frame |
| Boone Bridge | | 1927, 1928 | 1998-06-25 | Boone; 42°2′32″N 93°56′0″W | Boone | Parker/Pratt through truss |
| Boone Bridge 2 | | 1910 | 1998-06-25 | Boone; 42°3′47″N 93°58′13″W | Boone | Pennsylvania through truss |
| Boone River Bridge | | 1912 | 1998-05-15 | Goldfield; 42°51′26″N 93°56′46″W | Wright | riveted Warren pony truss |
| Boone Viaduct | Boone Viaduct | 1899–1901 | 1978-11-17 | Boone | Boone | Pratt deck truss |
| Bridge near West Liberty | West Liberty Bridge | 1937 | 1998-05-15 | West Liberty; 41°34′6″N 91°19′24″W | Muscatine | welded steel rigig frame |
| Bridgeport Bridge | Bridgeport Bridge | 1904 | 1998-05-15 | Denmark; 40°47′25″N 91°21′50″W | Lee | Pennsylvania through truss |
| Brooke Creek Bridge | | 1909 | 1998-06-25 | Sioux Rapids; 42°50′11″N 95°17′8″W | Buena Vista | Concrete spandrel arch |
| Buck Grove Bridge | | ca. 1945 | 1998-06-25 | Buck Grove; 41°54′50″N 95°22′49″W | Crawford | Bowstring pony arch-truss |
| Burlington Railroad Overpass | | 1937 | 1998-05-15 | Chariton; 41°2′27″N 93°21′57″W | Lucas | three-hinge deck archtruss |
| Burlington, Cedar Rapids, and Northern Railroad-Rock Rapids Station, Railroad Track and Bridge | | 1886 | 1976-11-07 | Rock Rapids; 43°26′1″N 96°9′59″W | Lyon | |
| Calamus Creek Bridge | | 1905 | 1998-05-15 | Maxwell; 41°53′4″N 93°22′54″W | Story | concrete Luten arch |
| Cascade Bridge | Cascade Bridge | 1896 | 1998-06-25 | Burlington; 40°46′52″N 91°5′54″W | Des Moines | Baltimore deck truss |
| Chain Lakes Bridge | | 1884 | 1998-05-15 | Hiawatha; 42°2′59″N 91°46′32″W | Linn | pinned Pratt through truss |
| Chambers Ford Bridge | | 1890 | 1998-05-15 | Chelsea; 41°53′1″N 92°20′9″W | Tama | pinned Pratt through truss |
| Cherry Street Bridge | | 1929 | 1998-06-25 | Shell Rock; 42°42′28″N 92°35′8″W | Butler | Concrete open-spandrel arch |
| Chicago, Rock Island and Pacific Railroad Stone Arch Viaduct | | 1868 | 1998-07-15 | Shelby; 41°31′26″N 95°26′11″W | Shelby | |
| CM and StP Railroad Underpass | | 1903 | 1998-05-15 | Washington; 41°17′36″N 91°43′28″W | Washington | Riveted Warren deck truss |
| Coal Creek Bridge | | 1889 | 1998-05-15 | Carlisle; 41°25′44″N 93°20′46″W | Warren | Pinned Pratt pony truss |
| Corbett's/Eby's Mill Bridge | Corbett's/Eby's Mill Bridge | 1871 | 1985-04-11 | Scotch Grove; 42°11′59″N 91°3′32″W | Jones | Arch beam truss |
| Cornelia Lake Bridge | | 1877 | 1998-05-15 | Clarion; 42°47′31″N 93°41′38″W | Wright | Pinned Pratt pony truss |
| County Line Bridge | | 1893 | 1998-05-15 | Columbus Junction; 41°16′51″N 91°29′6″W | Louisa/Washington | pinned Pratt through truss |
| Court Avenue Bridge | Court Avenue Bridge | 1918 | 1998-05-15 | Des Moines; 41°35′9″N 93°37′3″W | Polk | filled spandral arch |
| Cunningham Bridge | | 1886 | 1998-05-15 | Bevington; 41°24′6″N 93°51′40″W | Madison | pinned Pratt through truss |
| Cutler–Donahoe Bridge | Cutler–Donahoe Bridge | 1871, 1970 | 1976-10-08 | Winterset; 41°19′52″N 94°0′31″W | Madison | covered bridge |
| Des Moines River Bridge | | 1916 | 1998-05-15 | Swea City; 43°20′42″N 94°26′33″W | Kossuth | Marsh arch |
| Des Moines River Bridge | | 1939 | 1998-05-15 | Humboldt; 42°43′55″N 94°15′30″W | Humboldt | steel plate deck girderuss |
| Dry Run Bridge | | 1898 | 1998-06-25 | Littleport; 42°45′10″N 91°22′8″W | Clayton | Steel stringer |
| Dunkerton Bridge | | 1909 | 1998-06-25 | Dunkerton; 42°34′23″N 92°9′38″W | Black Hawk | Concrete spandrelarch |
| Dunleith and Dubuque Bridge | | 1872 | 2013-09-11 | Dubuque; 42°29′21″N 90°46′33″W | Dubuque | Pinned Pratt through truss |
| East Indian Creek Bridge | | 1912 | 1998-05-15 | Nevada; 41°58′31″N 93°23′13″W | Story | concrete Luten arch |
| Eisenhower Bridge | | 1888 | 1998-05-15 | Milton; 40°40′43″N 92°7′2″W | Van Buren | Pinned Pratt through truss |
| Eldorado Bridge | | 1898, 1899 | 1998-06-25 | Eldorado; 43°3′13″N 91°50′5″W | Fayette | Pinned Camelback truss |
| Elkader Keystone Bridge | Elkader Keystone Bridge | 1888, 1889 | 1976-11-07 | Elkader; 42°51′17″N 91°24′13″W | Clayton | stone arch bridge |
| Ellsworth Ranch Bridge | Ellsworth Ranch Bridge | 1895 | 1998-07-15 | Armstrong; 43°27′36″N 94°34′49″W | Emmet | Pratt/Warren through truss |
| Ely's Stone Bridge | | 1893 | 1979-03-07 | Monticello; 42°15′24″N 91°13′31″W | Jones | |
| Eveland Bridge | Eveland Bridge | 1876, 1877 | 1998-05-15 | Oskaloosa; 41°14′4″N 92°45′22″W | Mahaska | pinned Whipple through truss |
| First Avenue Bridge | First Avenue Bridge | 1920 | 1998-05-15 | Cedar Rapids; 41°58′36″N 91°40′20″W | Linn | open spandrel arch |
| Fish Creek Bridge | | 1894 | 1998-05-15 | Salem; 40°51′14″N 91°34′51″W | Henry | pinned Pratt bedstead |
| Fort Atkinson Bridge | | 1892 | 1998-05-15 | Fort Atkinson; 43°9′12″N 91°55′43″W | Winneshiek | Pinned Pratt through truss |
| Fort Madison Bridge | | 1925, 1927 | 1999-08-27 | Fort Madison; 40°37′16″N 91°17′15″W | Lee | Swing-span through truss |
| Fremont Mill Bridge | Fremont Mill Bridge | 1873 | 1998-05-15 | Anamosa; 42°6′36″N 91°7′58″W | Jones | bowstring through arch truss |
| Garnavillo Township Bridge | | 1902 | 1998-06-25 | Garnavillo; 42°51′47″N 91°16′57″W | Clayton | Stone arch |
| Garnavillo Township Culvert | | 1899 | 1998-06-25 | Garnavillo; 42°52′4″N 91°16′10″W | Clayton | Stone arch culvert |
| Garretson Outlet Bridge | | 1913 | 1999-03-12 | Whiting; 42°12′16″N 96°6′24″W | Monona | Warren pony truss |
| Gilliece Bridge | | 1873, 1874 | 1998-05-15 | Bluffton; 43°24′54″N 91°57′32″W | Winneshiek | Bowstring through arch-truss |
| Gipple's Quarry Bridge | | 1893 | 1998-05-15 | Columbus Junction; 41°12′17″N 91°24′31″W | Louisa | pinned Pratt through truss |
| Goldfield Bridge | | 1921 | 1998-05-15 | Goldfield; 42°44′14″N 93°55′29″W | Wright | Concrete deck girder |
| Grand River Bridge | | 1885 | 1998-05-15 | Arispe; 40°57′48″N 94°2′20″W | Union | Pinned Pratt through truss |
| Grand River Bridge | Grand River Bridge | ca. 1890 | 1998-06-25 | Leon; 40°43′18″N 93°52′33″W | Decatur | Pinned Pratt through truss |
| Green Mill Ford Bridge | | 1871 | 1998-06-25 | Janesville; 42°40′20″N 92°25′44″W | Bremer | Bowstring through arch-truss |
| Hale Bridge | Hale Bridge | 1877, 1879 | 1998-05-15 | Oxford Junction; 42°0′17″N 91°3′52″W | Jones | bowstring through arch truss |
| Hammond Bridge | | 1894 | 1998-05-15 | Hamilton; 41°10′39″N 93°0′50″W | Marion | Howe covered truss |
| Harvey Railroad Bridge | | 1878 | 1998-05-15 | Harvey; 41°19′2″N 92°54′36″W | Marion | pinned Pratt through truss |
| Hawkeye Creek Bridge | | 1909, 1910 | 1998-06-25 | Mediapolis; 41°2′33″N 91°3′26″W | Des Moines | Riveted Pratt through truss |
| Hawkeye Street Underpass | | 1889 | 1998-06-25 | Nora Springs; 43°8′24″N 93°0′20″W | Floyd | Stone masonry arch |
| Herrold Bridge | | 1921 | 1998-05-15 | Herrold; 41°43′19″N 93°44′59″W | Polk | concrete deck girder |
| Hogback Covered Bridge | | 1884 | 1976-08-28 | Winterset; 41°23′9″N 94°3′0″W | Madison | Town lattice |
| Holliwell Covered Bridge | Holliwell Covered Bridge | 1880 | 1976-08-28 | Winterset; 41°19′21″N 93°57′33″W | Madison | Town lattice |
| IANR Railroad Underpass | | 1887 | 1998-05-15 | Cedar Rapids; 41°56′40″N 91°38′12″W | Linn | stone masonry arch |
| Imes Covered Bridge | Imes Covered Bridge | 1870, 1887, 1977 | 1979-02-09 | St. Charles; 41°17′18″N 93°47′56″W | Madison | covered bridge |
| Indian Creek Bridge | | ca. 1880 | 1998-05-15 | Cedar Rapids; 41°58′2″N 91°34′52″W | Linn | pinned Pratt through truss |
| Iowa Falls Bridge | | 1928 | 1998-05-15 | Iowa Falls; 42°31′6″N 93°15′46″W | Hardin | open spandrel arch |
| Jefferson Street Viaduct | Jefferson Street Viaduct | 1935, 1936 | 1998-05-15 | Ottumwa; 41°0′39″N 92°24′55″W | Wapello | Riveted Warren deck truss |
| Julien Dubuque Bridge | | 1943 | 1999-08-27 | Dubuque; 42°29′30″N 90°39′17″W | Dubuque | Cantilevered tied arch |
| Keigley Branch Bridge | Kiegley Branch Bridge | 1913 | 1998-05-15 | Gilbert; 42°8′13″N 93°36′3″W | Story | filled spandrel arch |
| Kilbourn Bridge | Kilbourn Bridge | 1908, 1909 | 1998-05-15 | Kilbourn; 40°47′56″N 91°58′14″W | Van Buren | Pinned Pratt through truss |
| Kittyhawk Avenue Bridge | | 1913 | 1998-06-25 | Carroll; 42°1′47″N 94°53′52″W | Carroll | Riveted Warren pony truss |
| Klondike Bridge | | 1913, 1914 | 1998-05-15 | Larchwood; 43°23′16″N 96°31′18″W | Lyon | Pratt through truss |
| Lawrence Bridge | | 1880 | 1998-05-15 | Jackson Junction; 43°4′58″N 92°3′8″W | Winneshiek | Pinned Pratt pony truss |
| Le Grand Bridge (1914) | Le Grand Bridge (1914) | 1914, 1915 | 1998-05-15 | Le Grand; 42°1′47″N 92°46′59″W | Marshall | concrete deck girder |
| Le Grand Bridge (1896) | | 1896 | 1998-05-15 | Le Grand; 42°1′54″N 92°45′58″W | Tama | pinned Pratt through truss |
| Lincoln Highway Bridge | Lincoln Highway bridge | 1915 | 1978-03-30 | Tama; 41°57′52″N 92°33′47″W | Tama | Single-span slab bridge |
| Lincoln Highway-Little Beaver Creek Bridge | | 1915 | 1993-03-29 | Grand Junction; 42°2′57″N 94°10′37″W | Greene | Concrete slab bridge |
| Little Sioux River Bridge | | 1900, 1901 | 1998-06-25 | Spencer; 43°9′47″N 95°10′12″W | Clay | Pennsylvania through truss |
| Lower Road Bridge | | 1878 | 1998-05-15 | Anamosa; 41°55′49″N 91°18′44″W | Jones | bowstring through arch truss |
| Main Street Bridge | | 1909, 1910 | 1999-03-12 | Charles City; 43°3′48″N 92°40′35″W | Floyd | Concrete spandrel arch |
| Mallory Township Bridge | | 1890 | 1998-06-25 | Osterdock; 42°43′8″N 91°10′42″W | Clayton | Pinned Pratt pony truss |
| Manning Milwaukee Railroad Trestle | | 1913 | 2020-08-21 | Manning; 41°54′50.1″N 91°56′34″W | Carroll | Pratt through truss |
| Marsh Rainbow Arch Bridge | | 1914 | 1989-03-30 | Lake City; 42°13′46″N 95°3′48.5″W | Calhoun | Triple rainbow arch |
| Matsell Bridge | | 1938, 1939 | 1998-05-15 | Springville; 42°7′51″N 91°22′57″W | Linn | continuous plate through gir |
| Mederville Bridge | Mederville Bridge | 1918 | 1998-06-25 | Mederville; 42°45′50″N 91°25′17″W | Clayton | Concrete open spandrel arch |
| Melan Bridge | Melan Bridge | 1893, 1894 | 1974-10-18 | Rock Rapids; 43°25′49″N 96°9′19″W | Lyon | Melan design |
| Mill Creek Bridge | | 1888, 1889 | 1998-06-25 | Clarence; 41°54′15″N 91°3′53″W | Cedar | Pinned Pratt pony truss |
| Mill Creek Bridge | | 1891 | 1998-06-25 | Cherokee; 42°46′38″N 95°31′47″W | Cherokee | Pinned Pratt through truss |
| Mill Race Bridge | | 1892 | 1998-06-25 | West Union; 43°4′38″N 91°53′19″W | Fayette | Pinned Warren through truss |
| Miller Bridge | | 1884 | 1998-05-15 | Winterset; 41°24′45″N 93°56′34″W | Madison | pinned Pratt through truss |
| Minerva Creek Bridge | | 1910 | 1998-05-15 | Clemons; 42°8′21″N 93°9′21″W | Marshall | concrete Luten arch |
| Monona Township Culvert | | 1899 | 1998-06-25 | Luana; 43°2′39″N 91°28′35″W | Clayton | Stone arch culvert |
| Moore's Ford Bridge | | 1884 | 1998-05-15 | Monticello; 42°16′47″N 90°55′40″W | Jones | pinned Pratt through truss |
| Morgan Bridge | | 1891 | 1998-05-15 | Peru; 41°10′16″N 93°55′55″W | Madison | pinned Pratt through truss |
| Nishnabotna River Bridge | | 1929, 1930 | 1998-05-15 | Henderson; 41°5′21″N 95°28′49″W | Mills | riveted Warren pony truss |
| Nishnabotna River Bridge | Nishnabotna River Bridge | by 1945 | 1999-03-12 | Manilla; 41°52′0″N 95°16′0″W | Crawford | Bowstring pony arch-truss |
| Nishnabotna River Bridge | | ca. 1945 | 1998-06-25 | Manilla; 41°56′8″N 95°13′8″W | Crawford | Bowstring pony arch truss |
| Nodaway River Bridge | Nodaway River Bridge | 1876 | 1998-05-15 | Grant; 41°8′52″N 95°2′31″W | Montgomery | Bowstring pony arch-truss |
| North Skunk River Bridge | | 1920 | 1998-05-15 | New Sharon; 41°29′41″N 92°38′0″W | Mahaska | pinned Parker through truss |
| Oakland Mills Bridge | | 1876 | 1998-05-15 | Mount Pleasant; 40°56′7″N 91°37′9″W | Henry | pinned Pratt through truss |
| Okoboji Bridge | | 1909 | 1998-06-25 | Milford; 43°15′39″N 95°13′46″W | Dickinson | Pratt/Warren pony truss |
| Olympic Avenue Bridge | | 1913 | 1998-06-25 | Carroll; 42°6′53″N 94°48′45″W | Carroll | Riveted Warren pony truss |
| Otter Creek Bridge | | 1917 | 1998-06-25 | Oelwein; 42°41′10″N 91°56′49″W | Fayette | Concrete through girder |
| Pine Mill Bridge | Pine Mill Bridge | 1878 | 1998-05-15 | Muscatine; 41°28′36″N 90°52′56″W | Muscatine | pinned Pratt through truss |
| Plattsmouth Bridge | | 1929 | 1993-04-15 | Pacific Junction; 41°0′2″N 95°51′58″W | Mills | Cantlevered through truss |
| Quail Avenue Bridge | | 1913 | 1998-06-25 | Carroll; 42°1′50″N 94°47′0″W | Carroll | Riveted Warren pony truss |
| Quarry Bridge | | 1885 | 1998-05-15 | Quarry; 42°1′35″N 92°48′29″W | Marshall | pinned Whipple through truss |
| Read Township Culvert | | 1899 | 1999-03-12 | Elkader; 42°50′1″N 91°19′8″W | Clayton | Stone arch culvert |
| Red Bridge | | 1892 | 1998-05-15 | Monroe; 41°32′28″N 93°1′15″W | Jasper | pinned Warren through truss |
| Red Bridge | Red Bridge | 1920 | 1998-06-25 | Postville; 43°7′51″N 91°25′28″W | Allamakee | Timber/iron Pratt truss |
| River Street Bridge | | 1924 | 1998-05-15 | Iowa Falls; 42°31′11″N 93°16′5″W | Hardin | open spandrel arch |
| River Street Bridge | | 1912 | 1998-06-25 | Marble Rock; 42°58′2″N 92°52′5″W | Floyd | Concrete deck girder |
| Robin Avenue Bridge | | 1913 | 1998-06-25 | Carroll; 42°5′51″N 94°45′51″W | Carroll | Steel Warren pony truss |
| Rock Falls Bridge | | 1929 | 1998-06-25 | Rock Falls; 43°12′24″N 93°5′4″W | Cerro Gordo | Open spandrel arch |
| Rockwell City Bridge | | 1915 | 1998-06-25 | Rockwell City; 42°23′57″N 94°36′25″W | Calhoun | Concrete Marsh arch |
| Roseman Covered Bridge | Roseman Covered Bridge | 1883 | 1976-09-01 | Winterset; 41°17′31″N 94°9′5″W | Madison | Town lattice |
| Savanna-Sabula Bridge | | 1931, 1932 | 1999-08-27 | Sabula; 42°6′14″N 90°10′1″W | Jackson | Cantilever through truss |
| Shell Rock Bridge | | 1915 | 1999-03-12 | Shell Rock; 42°42′40″N 92°34′53″W | Butler | Concrete spandrel arch |
| Shellsburg Bridge | | 1915 | 1998-06-25 | Shellsburg; 41°54′48″N 91°52′20″W | Benton | Concrete spandrel arch |
| Skunk River Bridge | | 1876, 1916 | 1998-05-15 | Ames; 41°59′12″N 93°35′13″W | Story | pinned Warren through truss |
| Snider Bridge | | 1885 | 1998-06-25 | Corning; 40°59′28″N 94°36′38″W | Adams | Pinned Pratt pony truss |
| South Omaha Bridge | | 1933–1935 | 1992-06-29 | Council Bluffs; 41°12′47″N 95°55′57″W | Pottawattamie | Warren through truss |
| Southwest Fifth St. Bridge | Southwest Fifth Street Bridge | 1898 | 1998-05-15 | Des Moines; 41°34′37″N 93°37′10″W | Polk | pinned Pratt through truss |
| Squaw Creek Bridge | | 1917 | 1998-06-25 | Ridgeport; 42°26′44″N 93°45′39″W | Boone | Concrete Marsh arch |
| Squaw Creek Bridge 2 | | 1918 | 1998-06-25 | Ridgeport; 42°11′44″N 93°46′31″W | Boone | Concrete Marsh arch |
| State Street Bridge | | 1903 | 1998-06-25 | Mason City; 43°9′7″N 93°11′29″W | Cerro Gordo | Filled spandrel arch |
| Stewart Avenue Bridge | | 1914 | 1998-06-25 | Mason City; 43°9′24″N 93°11′25″W | Cerro Gordo | Filled spandrel arch |
| Steyer Bridge | | 1875 | 1983-01-04 | Decorah; 43°17′54″N 91°48′39″W | Winneshiek | |
| Stoe Creek Bridge | | 1913 | 1998-06-25 | Oelwein; 42°47′30″N 92°0′8″W | Fayette | Concrete through girder |
| Storm Creek Bridge | | 1913 | 1998-06-25 | Carroll; 42°6′7″N 94°48′11″W | Carroll | Steel Warren pony truss |
| Storm Creek Bridge 2 | | 1913 | 1998-06-25 | Carroll; 42°4′42″N 94°46′49″W | Carroll | Steel Warren pony truss |
| Sumner Bridge | | 1916, 1917 | 1998-06-25 | Sumner; 43°4′39″N 91°53′21″W | Fayette | Concrete deck girder |
| Sutliff Bridge | | 1897, 1898 | 1998-05-15 | Iowa City; 41°50′33″N 91°1′59″W | Johnson | pinned Parker through truss |
| Taylor's Ford Bridge | | 1872 | 1998-06-25 | Independence; 42°23′58″N 91°48′46″W | Buchanan | Bowstring through arch-truss |
| Third Street Bridge | | 1917 | 2018-05-31 | Waverly; 42°43′15″N 92°28′01″W | Bremer | Riveted Pratt through truss |
| Tremaine Bridge | | 1902 | 1998-05-15 | Webster City; 42°23′12″N 93°48′31″W | Hamilton | Camelback through truss |
| Twin Bridge | Twin Bridge | 1910 | 1998-06-25 | Fayette; 42°50′4″N 91°51′53″W | Fayette | Concrete Luten arch |
| Upper Bluffton Bridge | | 1880 | 1998-05-15 | Bluffton; 43°24′18″N 91°55′12″W | Winneshiek | Pinned Pratt through truss |
| Upper Iowa River Bridge | | 1913, 1914 | 1998-06-25 | Dorchester; 43°25′57″N 91°24′43″W | Allamakee | Riveted Pratt through truss |
| Upper Paris Bridge | Upper Paris Bridge | 1879 | 1998-05-15 | Coggon; 42°14′40″N 91°35′4″W | Linn | pinned Whipple through truss |
| Vine Street Bridge | Vine Street Bridge | 1910 | 1998-06-25 | West Union; 42°57′33″N 91°49′9″W | Fayette | Concrete Luten arch |
| Wabash Railroad Bridge | | 1882 | 1998-05-15 | Pella; 41°20′26″N 92°56′25″W | Marion | pinned Pratt through truss |
| Wapsipinicon River Bridge | Wapsipinicon River Bridge | 1926, 1927 | 1998-06-25 | Independence; 42°27′31″N 91°53′27″W | Buchanan | Concrete spandrel arch |
| Washington Avenue Bridge | | 1934 | 1998-05-15 | Iowa Falls; 42°31′11″N 93°16′16″W | Hardin | open spandrel arch |
| Washington Mill Bridge | | 1877, 1878 | 1998-06-25 | Bernard; 42°18′15″N 90°46′49″W | Dubuque | Bowstring through arch-truss |
| West Auburn Bridge | West Auburn Bridge | 1880, 1881 | 1998-06-25 | West Union; 43°0′59″N 91°52′43″W | Fayette | Pinned Whipple through truss |
| Winnebago River Bridge | Winnebago River Bridge | 1926 | 1998-06-25 | Mason City; 43°11′35″N 93°12′37″W | Cerro Gordo | Concrete deck girder |
| Yellow Smoke Park Bridge | | ca. 1945 | 1998-06-25 | Denison; 42°0′31″N 95°19′38″W | Crawford | Bowstring pony arch-truss |
| Beaver Creek Bridge | | 1946 | 1998-06-25 removed 2020-07-31 | Schleswig; 42°11′48″N 95°30′54″W | Crawford | Bowstring pony arch-truss |
| Bridge near New Sharon | | ca. 1900 | 1998-05-15 removed 2008-09-10 | New Sharon; 41°22′26″N 92°43′51″W | Mahaska | pipe kingpst pony truss |
| Cedar Covered Bridge | | 1920 | 1976-08-28 removed 2002-10-18 | Winterset | Madison | This covered bridge was destroyed by arson in 2002. It has been rebuilt. |
| Clay Avenue Bridge | | 1910 | removed 2002-05-08 | Drakesville | Davis | Riveted Warren beadstead |
| Coon Rapids Bridge | | 1922, 1923 | 1998-06-25 removed 2014-10-15 | Coon Rapids; 41°51′54″N 94°40′38″W | Carroll | Riveted Warren deck truss |
| County Road Bridge 15 | | 1905 | removed 2003-12-15 | Elkader | Clayton | Stone arch |
| Crane Creek Bridge | | 1910, 1911 | removed 2003-11-03 | Waterloo | Black Hawk | Riveted camelback pony-truss |
| Delta Covered Bridge | | 1867, 1869 | removed 2003-11-03 | Delta | Keokuk | |
| East Soldier River Bridge | | ca. 1945 | 1998-06-25 removed 2020-07-31 | Charter Oak; 42°3′28″N 95°38′1″W | Crawford | Bowstring pony arch-truss |
| Flint River Bridge | | 1883 | 1998-06-25 removed 2014-10-15 | Burlington; 40°54′19″N 91°13′22″W | Des Moines | Pinned Pratt through truss |
| Freeport Bowstring Arch Bridge | | 1879 | 1984-04-19; 2008-09-10 | Freeport; 43°18′10″N 91°44′22″W | Winneshiek | Hexagonal Plate Channel Arch |
| Indian Creek Bridge II | | 1888, 1889 | removed 1999-03-11 | Marion | Linn | pinned Pratt through truss |
| Keosauqua Bridge | | 1938, 1939 | 1998-05-15 removed 2008-09-10 | Keosauqua; 40°43′40″N 91°57′35″W | Van Buren | Riveted Warren through truss |
| McBride Covered Bridge | | 1871 | removed 1987-09-23 | Winterset | Madison | Town lattice |
| McDowell Bridge | McDowell Bridge | 1883 | 1998-05-15 removed 2012-05-10 | Montezuma; 41°31′14″N 92°40′32″W | Poweshiek | bowstring through arch-truss |
| Monsrud Bridge | | 1887 | 1998-06-25 removed 2022-04-12 | Waterville; 43°13′9″N 91°19′36″W | Allamakee | Bowstring pony arch-truss |
| Otranto Bridge | | 1899 | 1998-05-15 removed 2020-10-20 | St. Ansgar; 43°27′29″N 92°58′55″W | Mitchell | Camelback through truss |
| Otter Creek Bridge | | 1870 | removed 2004-06-22 | Hazleton | Buchanan | Bolted Pratt pony truss |
| Otterville Bridge | | 1875, 1876 | removed 2002-01-14 | Independence | Buchanan | Pinned Pratt through truss |
| Rubio Bridge | | 1904 | removed 2002-11-11 | Rubio | Washington | Pennsylvania through truss |
| Soper's Mill Bridge | | 1876 | removed 2003-12-15 | Ames | Story | Pony bowstring truss bridge |
| Suspension Bridge | | 1906 | 1989-10-30 removed 2009-01-09 | Charles City; 43°4′15″N 92°41′10″W | Floyd | Suspension foot bridge |
| Ten Mile Creek Bridge | | ca. 1895 | 1998-05-15 removed 2017-05-02 | Decorah; 43°20′17″N 91°53′18″W | Winneshiek | Kingpost pony truss |
| Toledo Bridge | | 1912 | 1998-05-15 removed 2009-01-09 | Toledo; 41°59′32″N 92°35′30″W | Tama | riveted Pratt through truss |
| Turkey River Bridge | | 1873 | 1998-05-15 removed 2014-10-15 | Festina; 43°0′17″N 91°54′10″W | Winneshiek | Bowstring through arch-truss |
| White Water Creek Bridge | White Water Creek Bridge | 1868 | 1998-06-25 removed 2012-05-09 | Bernard; 42°18′16″N 90°54′41″W | Dubuque | Pinned Pratt through truss |
| Welsh Bridge | | 1905 | removed 2003-12-15 | Somers | Calhoun | Riveted Warren pony truss |
| Yellow Spring Creek Bridge | | 1916, 1917 | removed 2003-12-15 | Mediapolis | Des Moines | Half-hip Pratt pony truss |
