= Otter Creek Bridge =

Otter Creek Bridge may refer to:

- Otter Creek Bridge (Oelwein, Iowa), listed on the NRHP in Fayette County, Iowa
- Otter Creek Bridge (Hazleton, Iowa), formerly listed on the NRHP in Iowa, in Buchanan County
- Otter Creek Bridge (Cedar Vale, Kansas), listed on the NRHP in Chautauqua County, Kansas
- North Branch Otter Creek Bridge, Piedmont, Kansas, listed on the NRHP in Greenwood County, Kansas
