= Fish Creek Bridge =

Fish Creek Bridge may refer to:

- Fish Creek Covered Bridge, in Hundred, West Virginia, listed on the NRHP in West Virginia
- Fish Creek Bridge (Tortilla Flat, Arizona), listed on the NRHP in Arizona
- Fish Creek Bridge (Salem, Iowa), listed on the NRHP in Iowa

== See also ==
- Fish Creek Dam, in Carey, Idaho, listed on the NRHP in Idaho
