= Des Moines River Bridge =

Des Moines River Bridge may refer to:

- Des Moines River Bridge (Humboldt, Iowa), listed on the National Register of Historic Places in Humboldt County, Iowa
- Des Moines River Bridge (Swea City, Iowa), listed on the National Register of Historic Places in Kossuth County, Iowa
