= Main Street Bridge =

Main Street Bridge may refer to:

- Main Street Bridge (New Blaine, Arkansas)
- Main Street Bridge (Florence, Colorado), listed on the NRHP in Fremont County, Colorado
- Main Street Bridge (Stamford, Connecticut)
- Main Street Bridge (Daytona Beach), Florida, carries County Road 4040 (Volusia County, Florida) across the Atlantic Intracoastal Waterway
- Main Street Bridge (Jacksonville, Florida)
- Main Street Bridge (Charles City, Iowa)
- Main Street Bridge (Elkhorn, Nebraska), listed on the NRHP in Douglas County, Nebraska
- Main Street Bridge (Califon, New Jersey), listed on the NRHP in Hunterdon County, New Jersey
- Main Street Bridge (Clinton, New Jersey), listed on the NRHP in Hunterdon County, New Jersey
- Main Street Bridge (Rochester, New York)
- Scuppernong River Bridge, Columbia, North Carolina, also known as Main Street Bridge
- Rainbow Arch Bridge (Valley City, North Dakota), also known as Main Street Bridge
- Main Street Bridge (Columbus, Ohio)
- Main Street Bridge (Hillsboro, Oregon), a MAX Light Rail bridge
- Main Street Bridge (Pawtucket, Rhode Island)
- Paddock Viaduct, Fort Worth, Texas, also known as Main Street Bridge

== See also ==
- East Main Street Bridge, Corbin, Kentucky
