= Dry Run Bridge =

- U.S. National Register of Historic Places
- Location within Iowa Location within the United States
- Location: Local street over Dry Run, Littleport, Iowa
- Coordinates: 42°45′21.5″N 91°22′15″W
- Built: 1898
- Built by: A.C. Boyle; A.J. Nading
- Architectural style: Steel stringer bridge
- MPS: Highway Bridges of Iowa MPS
- NRHP reference No.: 98000803
- Added to NRHP: June 25, 1998

The Dry Run Bridge is a historic structure located in the unincorporated community of Littleport, Iowa, United States. It carries a private lane over Dry Run for 30 feet (9.1 m). Around the turn of the 20th-century Clayton County contracted with various firms and individuals to build bridges across its rivers, streams and ditches. Short spans like this one generally had a timber stringer structure. They were inexpensive, but they didn't last long. They were eventually replaced by steel stringer structures. For the most part, that transition did happen until after 1900. That makes this steel stringer bridge, erected in 1898, quite rare. It is the oldest known structure of its kind in Iowa. A.C. Boyle was paid $184.50 to erect the bridge. In 1907 A.J. Nading was paid $471 to build two new stone abutments. This bridge was listed on the National Register of Historic Places in 1998.
