= Matsell Bridge =

- U.S. National Register of Historic Places
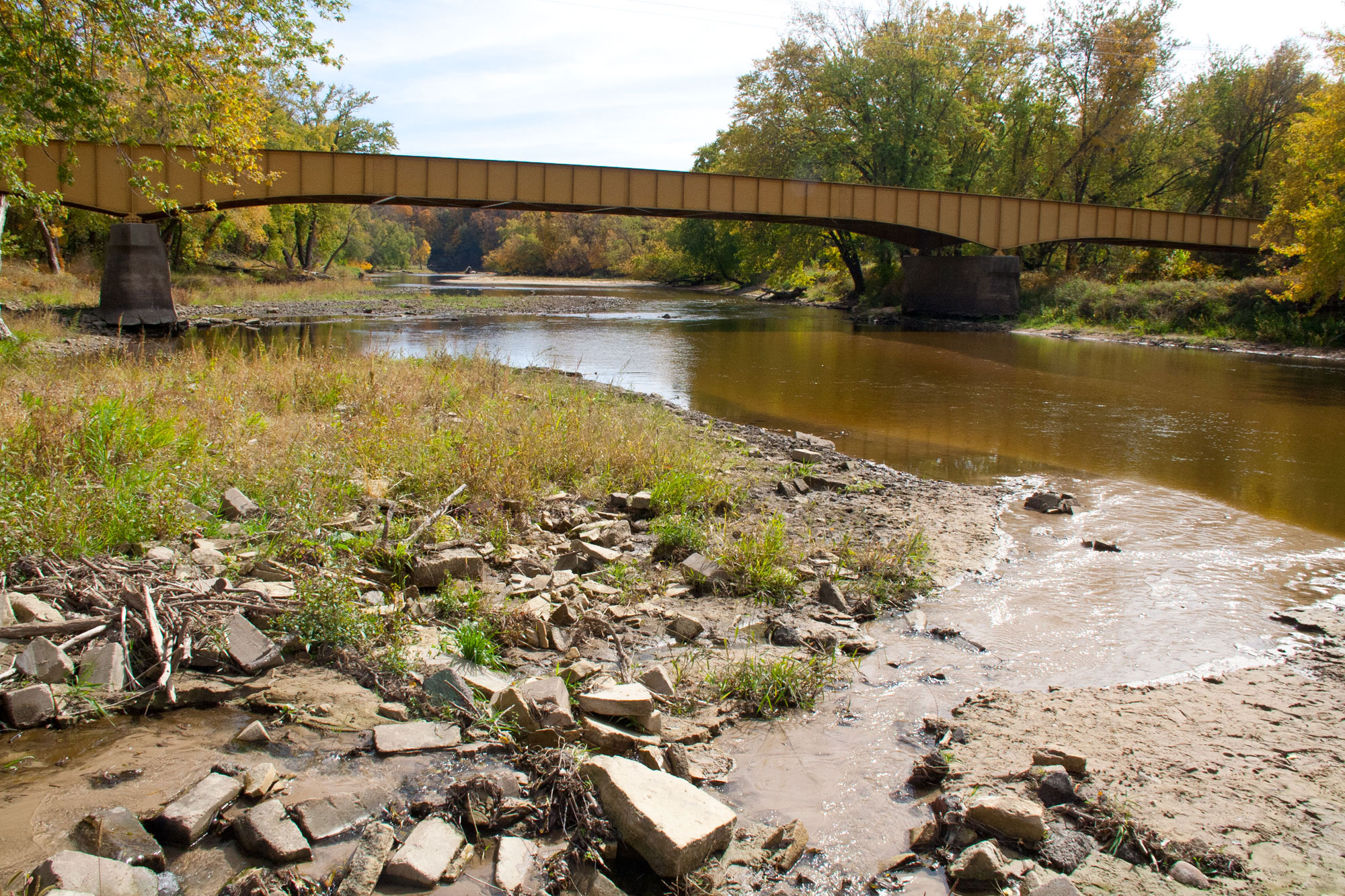

- Location within Iowa Location within the United States
- Location: Natsell Park Rd. over the Wapsipinicon River
- Nearest city: Springville, Iowa
- Coordinates: 42°07′50″N 91°22′59.7″W
- Built: 1938-1939
- Built by: WPA
- Architect: Iowa State Highway Commission
- Architectural style: Plate girder bridge
- MPS: Highway Bridges of Iowa MPS
- NRHP reference No.: 98000534
- Added to NRHP: May 15, 1998

The Matsell Bridge is a historic structure located northeast of Springville, Iowa, United States. It carries Matsell Park Road for 303 feet (92 m) over the Wapsipinicon River. This bridge replaced a bowstring truss bridge that had been built in stages between 1870 and 1906. E.W. Blumenschein, bridge design engineer for the Iowa State Highway Commission, recommended a plate girder bridge as a replacement. Clifford Shoemaker, District Engineer of the Federal Bureau of Public Roads, approved the plans as the new span was built by the Works Progress Administration. It was constructed by Amos Melberg for about $22,300. The bridge was listed on the National Register of Historic Places in 1998.

== See also ==
- List of bridges on the National Register of Historic Places in Iowa
- National Register of Historic Places listings in Linn County, Iowa
