= Morgan Bridge (Old Peru, Iowa) =

- U.S. National Register of Historic Places
- Location within Iowa Location within the United States
- Location: Maple Lane over a branch of Clanton Creek
- Nearest city: Old Peru, Iowa
- Coordinates: 41°10′16″N 93°55′55″W
- Built: 1891
- Built by: Benton Jones
- Architect: King Iron Bridge & Manufacturing Company
- Architectural style: Pratt pony truss
- MPS: Highway Bridges of Iowa MPS
- NRHP reference No.: 98000507
- Added to NRHP: May 15, 1998

The Morgan Bridge is a historic structure, originally located southeast of Old Peru, Iowa, United States. It spanned a branch of Clanton Creek for 60 feet (18 m). The wrought iron or steel Pratt pony truss was manufactured by the King Iron Bridge & Manufacturing Company of Cleveland. Benton Jones of Winterset, Iowa assembled it for $376.39. The approaches are timber stringer spans, and it is supported by timber pile bents. The bridge has not been operational for years. It was listed on the National Register of Historic Places in 1998. The span originally served a remote crossing, but has subsequently been relocated and is now owned by the Madison County Historical Society.
