= East Indian Creek Bridge =

- U.S. National Register of Historic Places
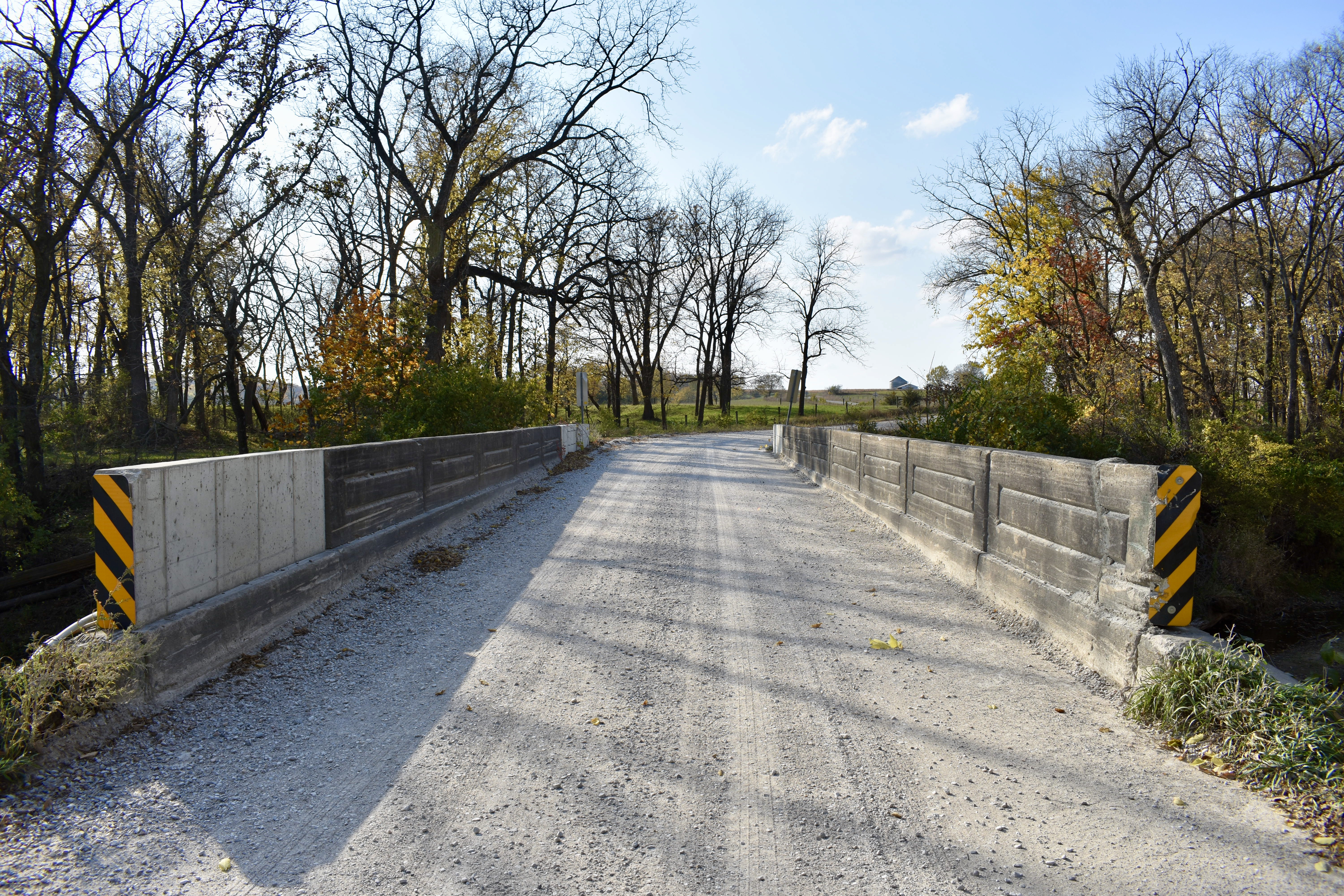

- Location within Iowa Location within the United States
- Location: 260th St. over East Indian Creek
- Nearest city: Nevada, Iowa
- Coordinates: 41°58′30.4″N 93°23′13.6″W
- Built: 1912
- Built by: N.M. Stark and Company
- Architectural style: Luten arch
- MPS: Highway Bridges of Iowa MPS
- NRHP reference No.: 98000485
- Added to NRHP: May 15, 1998

East Indian Creek Bridge is a historic structure located southeast of Nevada, Iowa, United States. It spans East Indian Creek for 78 feet (24 m). N.M. Stark and Company of Des Moines started building bridges for Story County beginning in 1902, and then they held an exclusive contract until 1913 when the Iowa Legislature banned the practice. Stark constructed this concrete Luten arch structure in 1912 for $4,462 as part of a multi-bridge contract. This was the longest concrete arch built by Stark in Story County. It was listed on the National Register of Historic Places in 1998.

== See also ==
- List of bridges on the National Register of Historic Places in Iowa
- National Register of Historic Places listings in Jones County, Iowa
