= Harvey Railroad Bridge =

- U.S. National Register of Historic Places
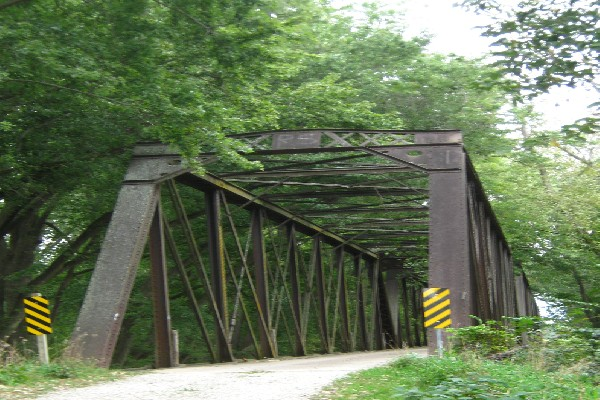

- Location within Iowa Location within the United States
- Location: Harvey Island Rd.
- Nearest city: Harvey, Iowa
- Coordinates: 41°19′02″N 92°54′36″W
- Area: less than one acre
- Built: 1878
- Architect: Chicago, Burlington and Quincy Railroad
- Architectural style: Pratt through truss
- MPS: Highway Bridges of Iowa MPS
- NRHP reference No.: 98000502
- Added to NRHP: May 15, 1998

The Harvey Railroad Bridge is a historic structure located east of Harvey, Iowa, United States. It spans an old channel of the Des Moines River for 600 feet (180 m). The Albia, Knoxville and Des Moines Railroad (AK&D) was planned to traverse the central part of Marion County. Even though a special tax in the townships the tracks would pass through was approved in 1870, they were unable to complete the line. The Chicago, Burlington and Quincy Railroad (CB&Q) acquired the AK&D's assets in 1875 and completed the line. Initially, the tracks did not cross the Des Moines River where the railroad employed ferries or a temporary bridge. The CB&Q contracted with the American Bridge Company in 1878 to fabricate the wrought iron Pratt through truss span. Stone abutments and piers support the bridge. It is not known whether the CB&Q or AmBridge built the span. It remained in use as a railroad bridge until 1938 when the county acquired the bridge and the right-of-way for a county road. The river itself has subsequently been rerouted, and now the bridge crosses a narrow stream. The bridge was listed on the National Register of Historic Places in 1998.
