= Keigley Branch Bridge =

- U.S. National Register of Historic Places
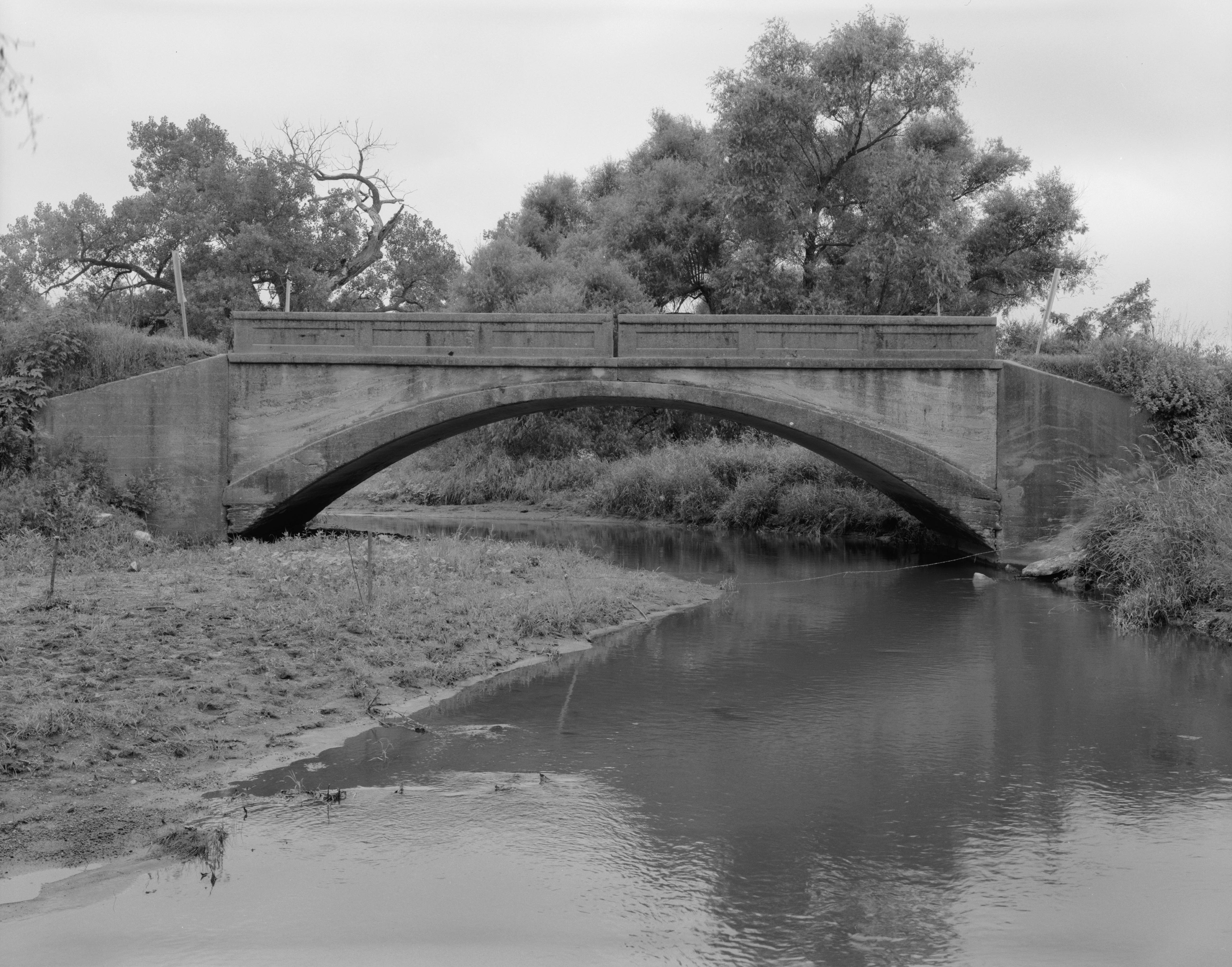

- Location within Iowa Location within the United States
- Location: 550th Street over Keigley Branch
- Nearest city: Gilbert, Iowa
- Coordinates: 42°08′12.8″N 93°36′03.6″W
- Built: 1913
- Built by: Koss Construction Company
- Architect: Iowa State Highway Commission
- Architectural style: Spandrel arch
- MPS: Highway Bridges of Iowa MPS
- NRHP reference No.: 98000483
- Added to NRHP: May 15, 1998

Keigley Branch Bridge is a historic structure located northeast of Gilbert, Iowa, United States. It spans the Keigley Branch for 47 feet (14 m). The Iowa State Highway Commission was re-formed in 1913 and they developed standard designs for smaller bridges. One of their designs was an alternative to the Luten arch. They were built throughout the state in the 1910s and 1920s. This is the oldest remaining arch bridge from that era. The Koss Construction Company of Des Moines completed it in 1913 for $3,384.85. The bridge features a medium-span arch with concrete-filled spandrels, paneled guardrails, a corbeled arch ring, and two-tone concrete detailing. The Keigley Branch Bridge was listed on the National Register of Historic Places in 1998.

== See also ==
- List of bridges documented by the Historic American Engineering Record in Iowa
- List of bridges on the National Register of Historic Places in Iowa
- National Register of Historic Places listings in Jones County, Iowa
