= IANR Railroad Underpass =

- U.S. National Register of Historic Places
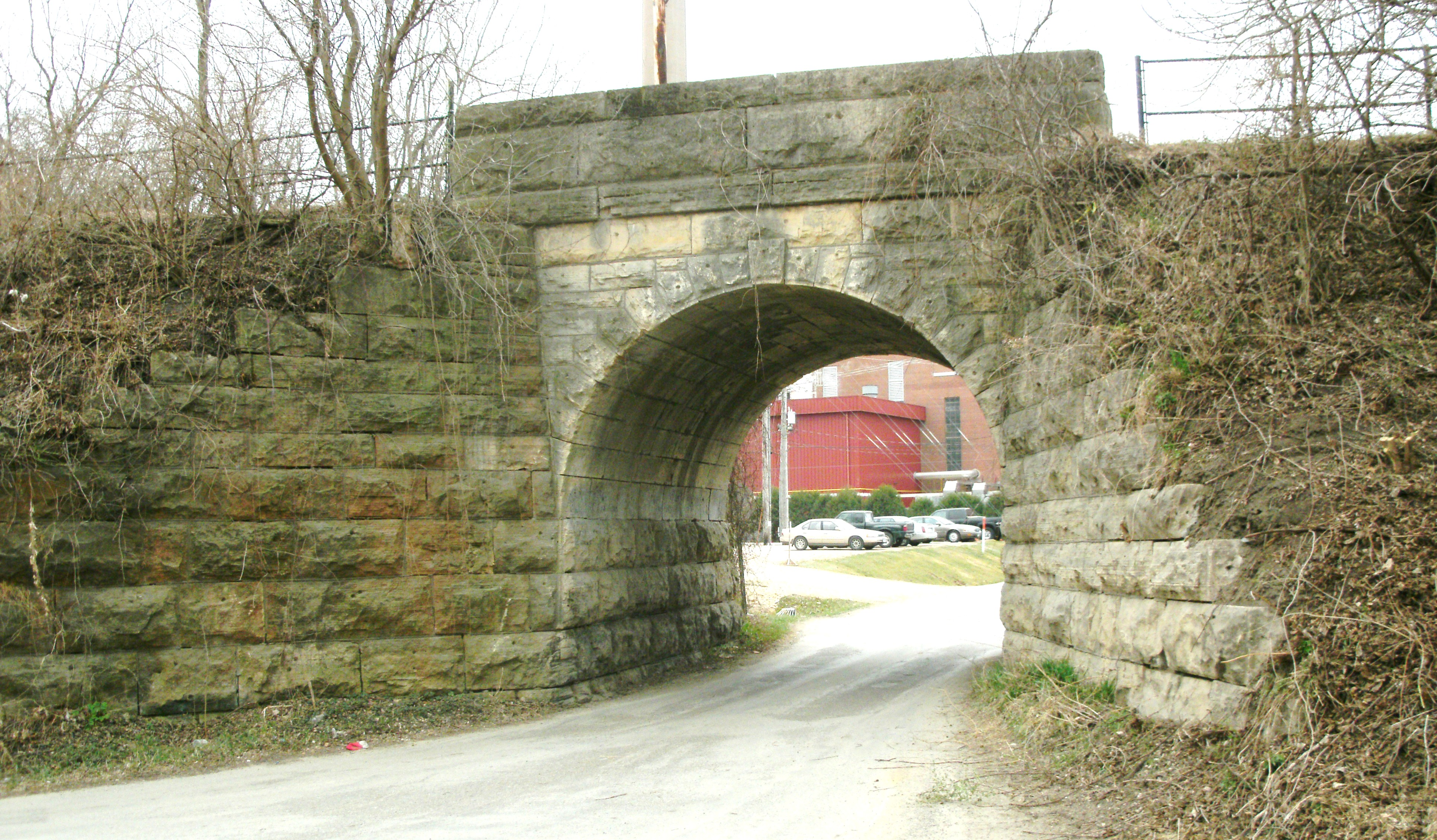

- Location within Iowa Location within the United States
- Location: Ely Rd. Cedar Rapids, Iowa
- Coordinates: 41°56′40.5″N 91°38′12.8″W
- Built: 1887
- MPS: Highway Bridges of Iowa MPS
- NRHP reference No.: 98000528
- Added to NRHP: May 15, 1998

The IANR Railroad Underpass is a historic structure located in Cedar Rapids, Iowa, United States. It carried railroad tracks for 24 feet (7.3 m) over Ely Road. The railroad probably built this stone arch bridge, which was completed in 1887. This kind of structure became more popular in the late 19th century as a railroad bridge because it was more durable than metal truss bridges, and they "projected a refined and sophisticated image." It features a semi-circular arch, a beltcourse, coursed-ashlar masonry, stepped wing walls that are flared, a parapet with projecting coping, and an elongated keystone with the date "1887" carved on it. The bridge was listed on the National Register of Historic Places in 1998. It now carries the Cedar River Recreation Trail over the street.

== See also ==
- List of bridges on the National Register of Historic Places in Iowa
- National Register of Historic Places listings in Linn County, Iowa
