= Gilliece Bridge =

Historic bridge in Iowa, United States

- U.S. National Register of Historic Places
- Location within Iowa Location within the United States
- Location: Cattle Creek Road over the Upper Iowa River
- Nearest city: Bluffton, Iowa
- Coordinates: 43°24′53.5″N 91°57′31.2″W
- Built: 1873-1874
- Built by: Wrought Iron Bridge Company; Thomas Dwyer
- Architectural style: Bowstring through arch-truss
- MPS: Highway Bridges of Iowa MPS
- NRHP reference No.: 98000464
- Added to NRHP: May 15, 1998

The Gilliece Bridge was a historic structure located west of Bluffton, Iowa, United States. It spanned the Upper Iowa River for 151 feet (46 m). In 1872 Winneshiek County started to replace its older short span timber and stone bridges. This Bowstring through arch-truss bridge was designed, fabricated, and built by the Wrought Iron Bridge Company of Canton, Ohio in 1874 for $6,969.47. Thomas Dwyer, a local stonemason, built the masonry abutments. The bridge was listed on the National Register of Historic Places in 1998. The bridge was destroyed in May 2017 by an overweight truck which was driven onto it despite the posted weight limit of three tons.
