= Shell Rock Bridge =

- U.S. National Register of Historic Places
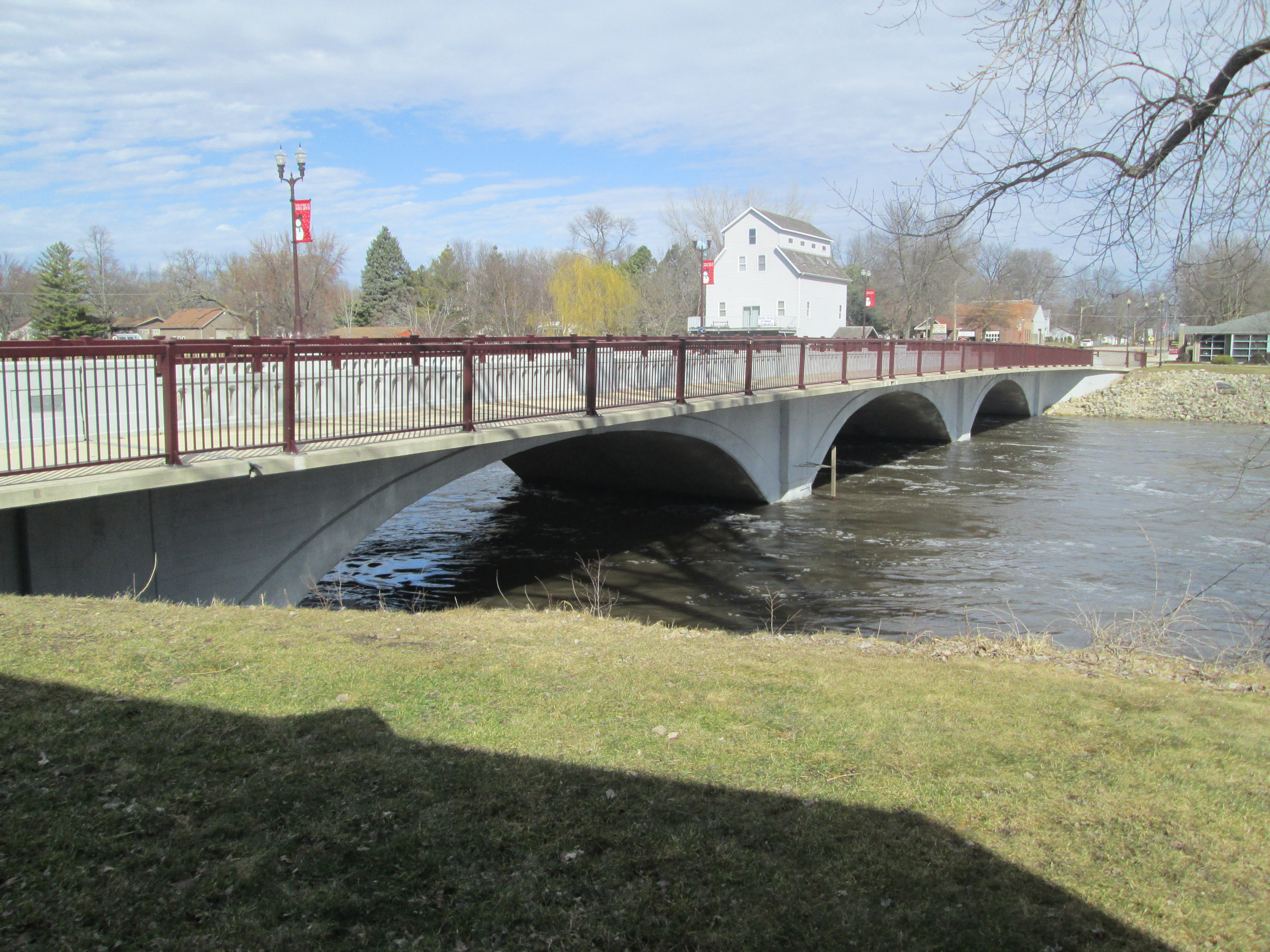

- Location within Iowa Location within the United States
- Location: Cherry St. over the Shell Rock River; Shell Rock, Iowa
- Coordinates: 42°42′40″N 92°34′53″W
- Area: less than one acre
- Built: 1915
- Built by: Miller-Hey Construction Co.
- Architect: Iowa State Highway Commission
- Architectural style: Spandrel arch
- MPS: Highway Bridges of Iowa MPS
- NRHP reference No.: 99000307
- Added to NRHP: March 12, 1999

The Shell Rock Bridge is a historic bridge located in Shell Rock, Iowa, United States. It spans the Shell Rock River for 266 feet (81 m). On May 11, 1915, the Butler County Board of Supervisors approved contracts for the Waterloo, Iowa bridge contractor Miller-Hey Construction Co. to build three bridges. This concrete filled spandrel arch bridge was completed in the fall of 1915 for $16,500. The bridge was designed by the Iowa State Highway Commission. It was listed on the National Register of Historic Places in 1998.
