= Albright Bridge =

- U.S. National Register of Historic Places
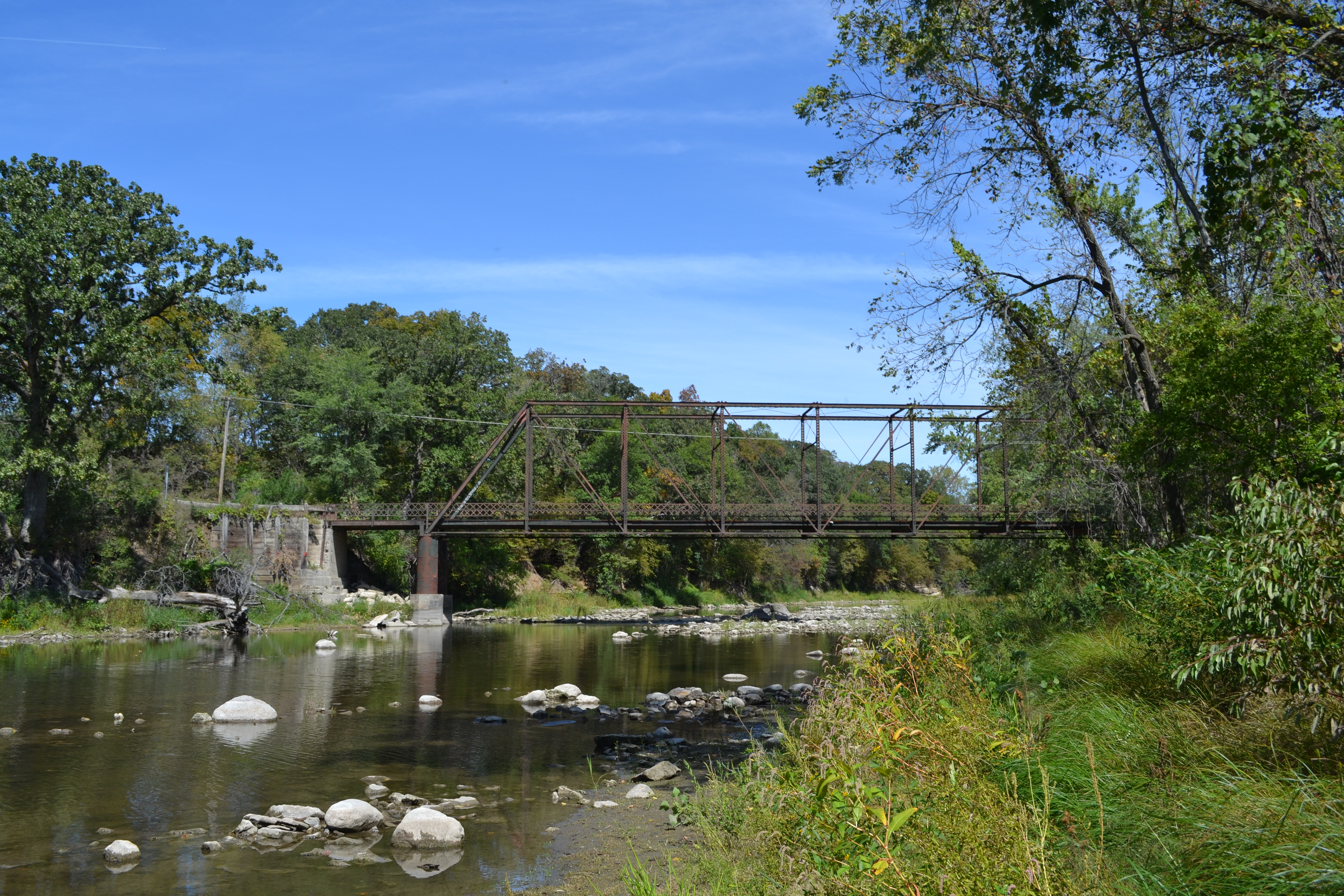

- Location within Iowa Location within the United States
- Location: 130th St. at 510th Ave. over the Boone River
- Nearest city: Webster City, Iowa
- Coordinates: 42°24′19.5″N 93°48′36″W
- Built: 1908
- Built by: A.H. Austin
- Architectural style: Pratt through truss
- MPS: Highway Bridges of Iowa MPS
- NRHP reference No.: 98000776
- Added to NRHP: June 25, 1998

The Albright Bridge is a historic structure located south of Webster City, Iowa, United States. It spans the Boone River for 207 feet (63 m). In April 1907 the Hamilton County Board of Supervisors contracted with A.H. Austin from Webster City to build the new bridge in Independence Township for $4,342. The Eastern Steel Company provided the steel. The Pratt through truss bridge was completed in early January 1908. The bridge was listed on the National Register of Historic Places in 1998.
