= Monona Township Culvert =

- U.S. National Register of Historic Places
- Location within Iowa Location within the United States
- Location: County road over an unnamed stream
- Nearest city: Luana, Iowa
- Coordinates: 43°02′38.9″N 91°28′35.9″W
- Built: 1899
- Built by: Frank Boyle
- Architectural style: Stone arch culvert
- MPS: Highway Bridges of Iowa MPS
- NRHP reference No.: 98000806
- Added to NRHP: June 25, 1998

The Monona Township Culvert was a historic structure located southwest of Luana, Iowa, United States. It spanned an unnamed stream for 14 feet (4.3 m). Clayton County built a number bridges over rivers, streams and ditches around the turn of the 20th century. They contracted with Frank Boyle to build this single stone arch culvert of native limestone in 1899. The culvert was listed on the National Register of Historic Places in 1998. It has subsequently been replaced.
