= Manning Milwaukee Railroad Trestle =

- U.S. National Register of Historic Places
- Location within Iowa Location within the United States
- Location: Crosses Railroad/Center St., 682 ft. north of Julia St., Manning, Iowa
- Coordinates: 41°54′50.3″N 95°03′48.5″W
- Built: 1913
- NRHP reference No.: 100005487
- Added to NRHP: August 21, 2020

The Manning Milwaukee Railroad Trestle is a historic structure located in Manning, Iowa, United States. The span was completed in 1913 by the Chicago, Milwaukee, St. Paul and Pacific Railroad. During World War II the rail bridge was guarded by the Iowa National Guard as it was considered part of a valuable transit route. In 1969 a person used dynamite in an attempt to derail the passenger train, sending it into the Nishnabotna River. While the train derailed, it was able to stop before it plunged off the trestle. In 2020, the bridge was listed on the National Register of Historic Places.
