= Hawkeye Street Underpass =

- U.S. National Register of Historic Places
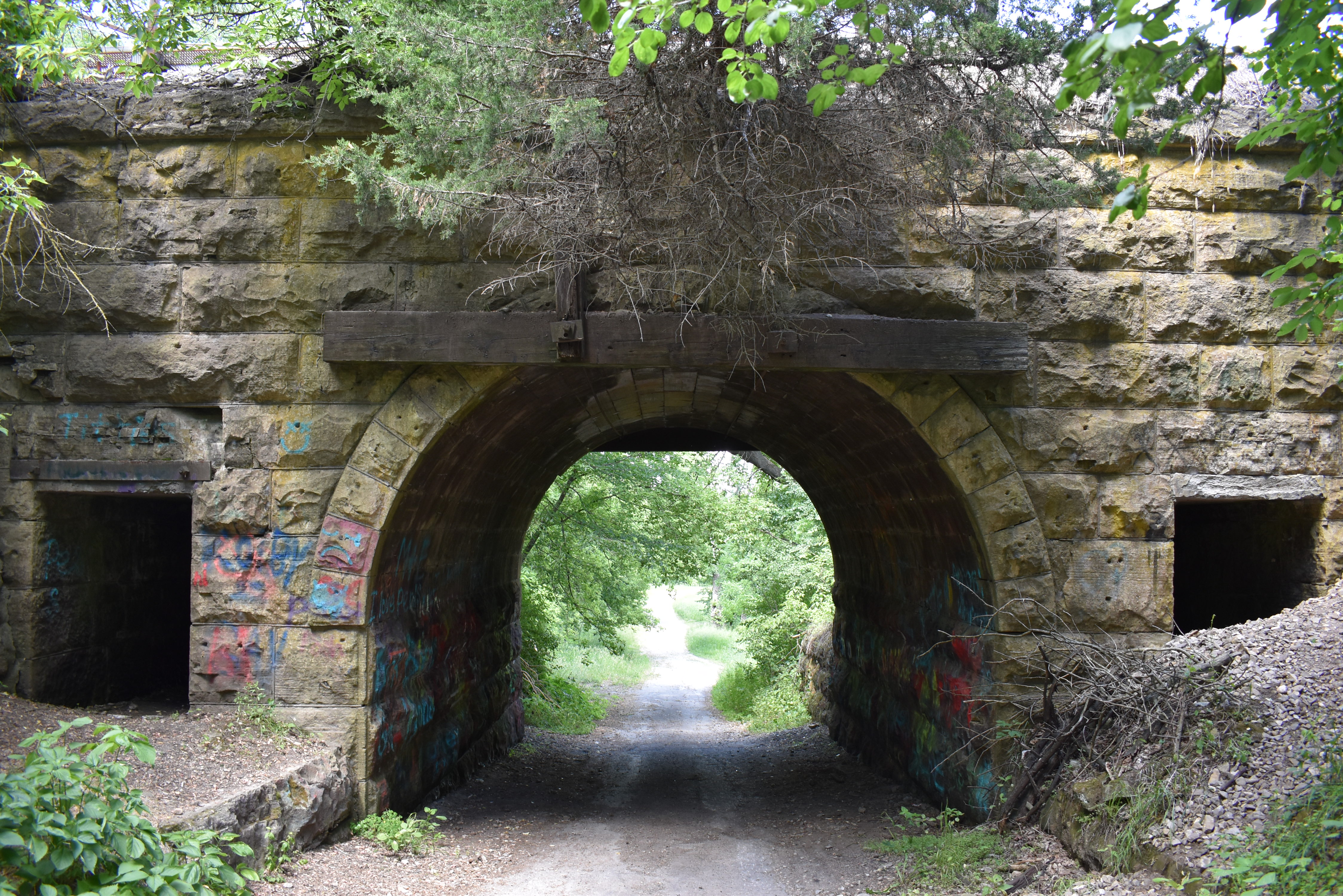
- The Hawkeye Street Underpass in 2021

- Location within Iowa Location within the United States
- Location: South Hawkeye St. under the railroad line, Nora Springs, Iowa
- Coordinates: 43°08′14″N 93°0′33.5″W
- Built: 1889
- Built by: Rock Island Railroad
- Architect: F.A. McDonald
- Architectural style: Stone masonry arch
- MPS: Highway Bridges of Iowa MPS
- NRHP reference No.: 98000777
- Added to NRHP: June 25, 1998

The Hawkeye Street Underpass is a historic structure located south of Nora Springs, Iowa, United States. It spans South Hawkeye Street for 28 feet (8.5 m). The Illinois Central Railroad arrived in Nora Springs in 1868, and the Burlington, Cedar Rapids & Northern Railway (BCR&N) arrived three years later. The later was acquired by the Chicago, Rock Island & Pacific Railroad in the early 1880s. This stone masonry arch underpass was constructed by the Rock Island Line in 1889 as part of an upgrade of the tracks. It was designed by F.A. McDonald who had worked for the BCR&N. It is the only known stone arch bridge in Floyd County. The bridge was listed on the National Register of Historic Places in 1998.
