= Fort Atkinson Bridge =

- U.S. National Register of Historic Places
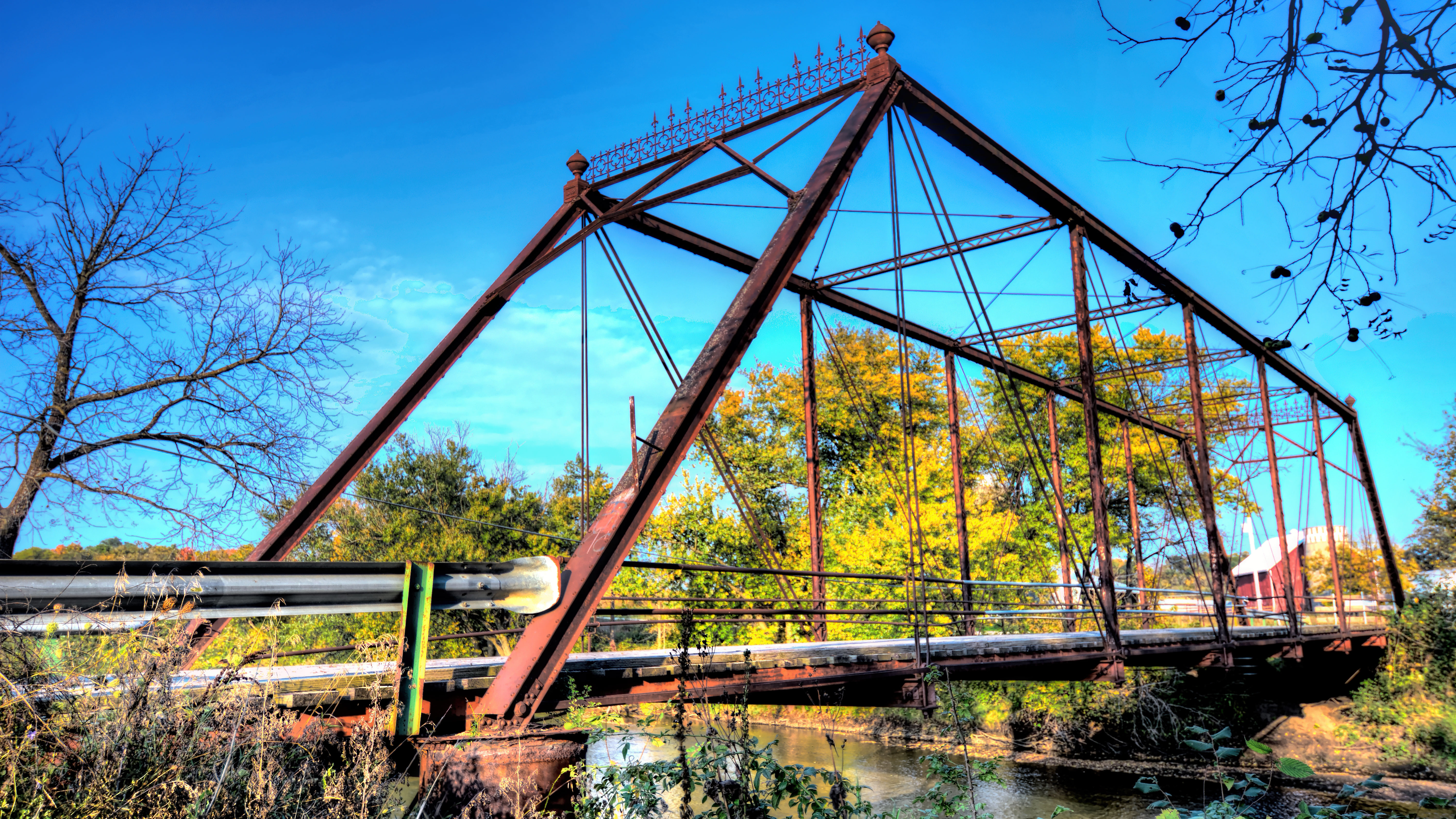

- Location within Iowa Location within the United States
- Location: 150th Street over the Turkey River; Fort Atkinson, Iowa
- Coordinates: 43.1532268°N 91.9284868°W
- Built: 1892
- Built by: D.H. Young
- Architectural style: Pratt through truss
- MPS: Highway Bridges of Iowa MPS
- NRHP reference No.: 98000460
- Added to NRHP: May 15, 1998

The Fort Atkinson Bridge is a historic structure located in Fort Atkinson, Iowa, United States. It spans the Turkey River for 183 feet (56 m). Pratt through truss bridges like its one were used almost exclusively in Iowa for medium spans from the early 1880s to 1913, when state bridge standards were enacted. This bridge was fabricated by the CRM Company, and constructed by D.H. Young of Manchester, Iowa. The 7-panel, pin-connected Pratt through truss is supported by a substructure of timber and concrete. It was listed on the National Register of Historic Places in 1998.
