= Fish Creek Bridge (Salem, Iowa) =

- U.S. National Register of Historic Places
- Location within Iowa Location within the United States
- Location: Hickory Rd. over Fish Creek
- Nearest city: Salem, Iowa
- Coordinates: 40°51′16″N 91°34′50.3″W
- Area: less than one acre
- Built: 1894
- Architect: King Iron Bridge Company
- MPS: Highway Bridges of Iowa MPS
- NRHP reference No.: 98000524
- Added to NRHP: May 15, 1998

The Fish Creek Bridge is a historic structure that was originally located east of Salem, Iowa, United States. The span carried Hickory Road over Fish Creek for 50 feet (15 m). It is a small-scale, wrought-iron bridge that the Henry County Board of Supervisors bought from the George E. King Bridge Company of Des Moines in 1893 for $410.80. It was believed to have been fabricated by their parent company, King Iron Bridge Company of Cleveland, and assembled by local laborers. Its historical significance derived from its being an uncommon variant of the Pratt truss. It was listed on the National Register of Historic Places in 1998. Subsequently, the bridge has been replaced at its original location, and the historic structure was moved to Oakland Mills Park.

== See also ==
- List of bridges on the National Register of Historic Places in Iowa
- National Register of Historic Places listings in Cerro Gordo County, Iowa
