= Steyer Bridge =

- U.S. National Register of Historic Places
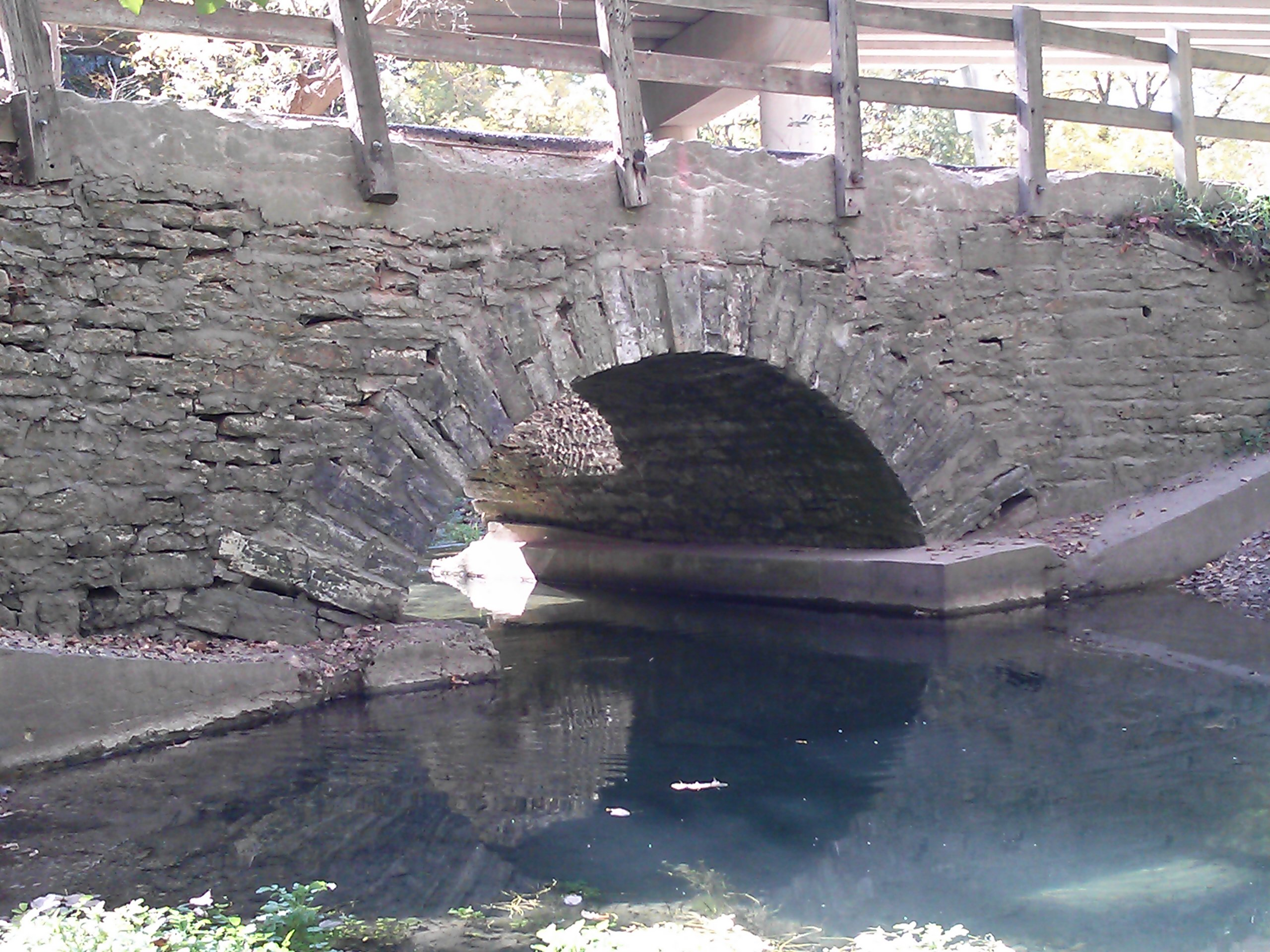

- Location within Iowa Location within the United States
- Location: Oneata Road off U.S. Route 52, Decorah, Iowa
- Coordinates: 43°17′54″N 91°48′39″W
- Built: 1875
- Built by: Michael Steyer
- Architectural style: Semi-circular stone arch
- MPS: Highway Bridges of Iowa MPS
- NRHP reference No.: 83000411
- Added to NRHP: January 4, 1983

The Steyer Bridge is a historic structure located on the west side of Decorah, Iowa, United States. This is one of the few stone arch bridges that continue to exist in Iowa. It was constructed by local stonemason Michael Steyer over Twin Springs Creek in 1875. Steyer emigrated from Germany in 1867, and settled in Decorah. His brother Joseph was the proprietor of the Steyer Opera House in town. Compared to other stone bridges in the state, this one is less sophisticated and is a good example of vernacular engineering. It is a small structure that consists of a single arch that is formed by rough-cut limestone voussoirs. The keystone is a block of dressed limestone with Steyer's name and the date "1875" carved on it. The spandrels and the walls that form the foundation for the approaches to the bridge consist of coursed rubble limestone. The base of the walls and the lower edges of the arch were reinforced with concrete in the 1970s. The concrete bridge deck is edged with wooden posts. When U.S. Route 52 was relocated to this area in the early 1970s, the Steyer Bridge was scheduled to be removed, but local protests saved it and the highway bridge built over it. The bridge listed on the National Register of Historic Places in 1983.
