= Read Township Culvert =

- U.S. National Register of Historic Places
- Location within Iowa Location within the United States
- Location: County road over an unnamed stream
- Nearest city: Elkader, Iowa
- Coordinates: 42°49′59.9″N 91°19′08.8″W
- Built: 1899
- Built by: Stoops & Williamson
- Architectural style: Stone arch culvert
- MPS: Highway Bridges of Iowa MPS
- NRHP reference No.: 99000308
- Added to NRHP: March 12, 1999

The Read Township Culvert is a historic structure located southeast of Elkader, Iowa, United States. It spans an unnamed stream for 14 feet (4.3 m). Clayton County built a number of bridges over rivers, streams and ditches around the turn of the 20th century. They contracted with local contractors Stoops and Williamson to build this single stone arch culvert of native limestone for $814.25. The culvert was listed on the National Register of Historic Places in 1999.
