= Nishnabotna River Bridge (Henderson, Iowa) =

- U.S. National Register of Historic Places
- Location within Iowa Location within the United States
- Location: County Road M16 over the Nishnabotna River southwest of Henderson
- Coordinates: 41°05′21″N 95°28′49″W
- Built: 1929-1930
- Built by: McCormack Construction Company
- Architect: Iowa State Highway Commission
- Architectural style: Warren Pony truss
- MPS: Highway Bridges of Iowa MPS
- NRHP reference No.: 98000496
- Added to NRHP: May 15, 1998

The Nishnabotna River Bridge is a Warren Pony truss bridge located southwest of Henderson, Iowa, United States. It spans the Nishnabotna River for 284 feet (87 m). The Warren Pony truss bridge was designed by engineers at the Iowa State Highway Commission in the summer of 1929. It was built by McCormack Construction Company of Lohrville, Iowa for $30,900, and completed in 1930. The bridge is made up of two skewed trusses that are supported by concrete abutments and piers. It was listed on the National Register of Historic Places in 1998.
