= Cunningham Bridge =

- U.S. National Register of Historic Places
- Location within Iowa Location within the United States
- Location: Upland Trail over the North River
- Nearest city: Bevington, Iowa
- Coordinates: 41°24′06″N 93°51′40″W
- Built: 1886
- Built by: George E. King Bridge Co.
- Architect: King Iron Bridge & Manufacturing Company
- Architectural style: Pratt pony truss
- MPS: Highway Bridges of Iowa MPS
- NRHP reference No.: 98000509
- Added to NRHP: May 15, 1998

The Cunningham Bridge is a historic structure located northwest of Bevington, Iowa, United States. It spans the North River for 143 feet (44 m). The Madison County Board of Supervisors contracted with the George E. King Bridge Company of Des Moines to replace an existing span that was to be moved to another site. The wrought iron Pratt pony truss bridge was shipped to the county and erected by June 1886 for $820. The approaches are timber stringer spans, and it is supported by timber pile bents. The bridge was listed on the National Register of Historic Places in 1998.
