= Shellsburg Bridge =

- U.S. National Register of Historic Places
- Location within Iowa Location within the United States
- Location: Pearl St. over Bear Creek; Shellsburg, Iowa
- Coordinates: 42°05′36.3″N 91°52′10.1″W
- Built: 1915
- Built by: Alfred Vinall
- Architect: Iowa State Highway Commission
- Architectural style: Spandrel arch
- MPS: Highway Bridges of Iowa MPS
- NRHP reference No.: 98000770
- Added to NRHP: June 25, 1998

The Shellsburg Bridge is a historic structure located in Shellsburg, Iowa, United States. It spans Bear Creek for 64 feet (20 m). In April 1915 the Benton County Board of Supervisors contracted with Alfred Vinall to build the new bridge near Shellsburg's downtown area. He used a special design by the Iowa State Highway Commission (ISHC), and completed the project in late 1915 for $6,081.06. The ISHC designed plain bridges for its rural spans, but because this span is in town it features decorative elements: bichrome concrete detailing, molded concrete balustrades, and incised spandrel panels. The bridge was listed on the National Register of Historic Places in 1998.
