= Brooke Creek Bridge =

- U.S. National Register of Historic Places
- Location within Iowa Location within the United States
- Nearest city: Sioux Rapids, Iowa
- Coordinates: 42°50′11″N 95°17′8″W
- Area: less than one acre
- Built: 1909
- Architect: McCollough, G.K.; Barns, W.A.
- Architectural style: Concrete spandrel arch
- MPS: Highway Bridges of Iowa MPS
- NRHP reference No.: 98000754
- Added to NRHP: June 25, 1998

Brooke Creek Bridge is a bridge in Buena Vista County, Iowa. The bridge spans Brooke Creek at the elevation of 396 metres (1,299 ft) above sea level. The bridge was completed in 1909. It was added to the National Register of Historic Places in 1998 due to the significance of its historic architecture and engineering.
