= Cornelia Lake Bridge =

- U.S. National Register of Historic Places
- Location within Iowa Location within the United States
- Location: Over an inlet of Cornelia Lake
- Nearest city: Clarion, Iowa
- Coordinates: 42°47′34″N 93°41′24″W
- Area: less than one acre
- Built: 1877
- Built by: A.S. Leonard
- Architectural style: Pratt Pony truss
- NRHP reference No.: 98000455
- Added to NRHP: May 15, 1998

Cornelia Lake Bridge is a historic structure located northeast of Clarion, Iowa, United States. The bridge was originally constructed over the Iowa River in 1877. It was built by A.S. Leonard by using steel supplied by the Wrought Iron Bridge Company. It was named the Berry Bridge after local landowner James Berry for most of its existence. It was replaced by a new span in 1986 and the main span of this bridge was moved to Cornelia Lake Park where it serves as a pedestrian bridge over a small inlet. It was listed on the National Register of Historic Places in 1998.
