= Garnavillo Township Bridge =

- U.S. National Register of Historic Places
- Location within Iowa Location within the United States
- Location: County road over an unnamed stream
- Nearest city: Garnavillo, Iowa
- Coordinates: 42°51′46.3″N 91°16′57.4″W
- Built: 1902
- Built by: A.C. Boyle
- Architectural style: Deck arch bridge
- MPS: Highway Bridges of Iowa MPS
- NRHP reference No.: 98000807
- Added to NRHP: June 25, 1998

The Garnavillo Township Bridge is a historic structure located west of Garnavillo, Iowa, United States. It spans an unnamed stream for 20 feet (6.1 m). Around the turn of the 20th-century Clayton County embarked on a project to replace its old bridges. On short crossing like this one they generally chose simple timber stringer structures. But for this one, and several others, they chose to take advantage of the large limestone deposits in the county. They contracted with stonemason A.C. Boyle of McGregor, Iowa to build this single deck arch bridge for $1,462.72. It replaced an old combination truss span. This bridge also been replaced, but it remains in place underneath the newer bridge. It was listed on the National Register of Historic Places in 1998.
