= Sumner Bridge =

- U.S. National Register of Historic Places
- Location within Iowa Location within the United States
- Location: 160th St. over the Little Wapsipinicon River, Sumner, Iowa
- Coordinates: 42°51′41″N 92°04′53.3″W
- Built: 1916-1917
- Built by: Fred Boedeker
- Architect: Iowa State Highway Commission
- Architectural style: Girder bridge
- MPS: Highway Bridges of Iowa MPS
- NRHP reference No.: 98000782
- Added to NRHP: June 25, 1998

Sumner Bridge is a historic structure located in Sumner, Iowa, United States. It spans the Little Wapsipinicon River for 125 feet (38 m). In June 1916 the Fayette County Board of Supervisors agreed with the supervisors in Bremer County to build this bridge on the county line. The agreement was for Bremer County to take the lead on the planning and for both counties to share the costs. Fred Boedeker was awarded a contract for $7,058 to build this concrete deck girder bridge designed by the Iowa State Highway Commission. The three span structure features concrete abutments and piers with bullnosed cutwaters. The bridge was listed on the National Register of Historic Places in 1998.
