= Hammond Bridge =

- U.S. National Register of Historic Places
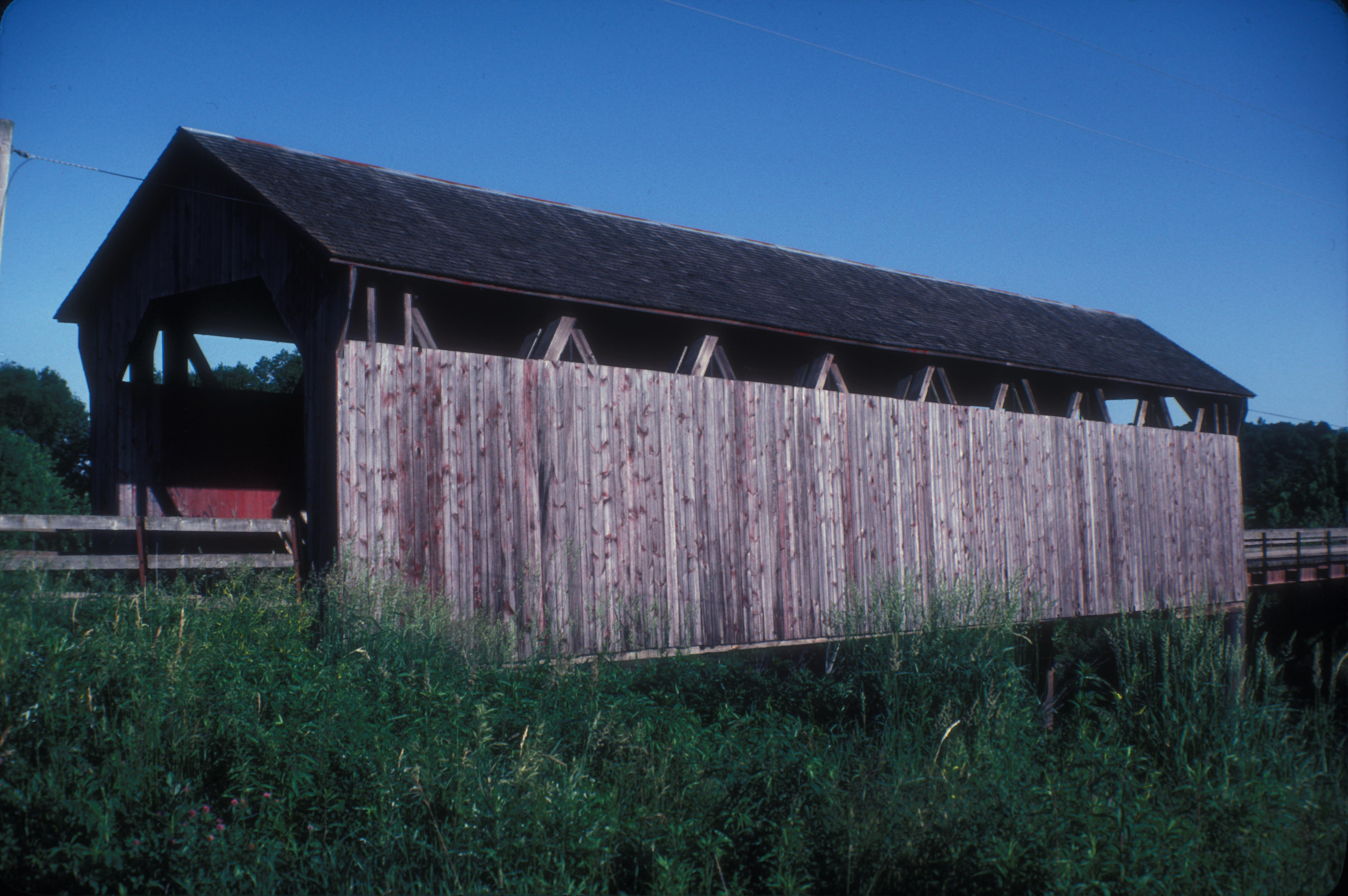

- Location within Iowa Location within the United States
- Location: 170th Pl. over North Cedar Creek
- Nearest city: Hamilton, Iowa
- Coordinates: 41°10′39″N 93°00′50″W
- Area: less than one acre
- Built: 1894
- Built by: S.F. Collins
- Architectural style: Howe covered through truss
- MPS: Highway Bridges of Iowa MPS
- NRHP reference No.: 98000500
- Added to NRHP: May 15, 1998

The Hammond Bridge is a historic structure located west of Hamilton, Iowa, United States. It spans North Cedar Creek for 178 feet (54 m). In January 1894, Samuel B. Hammond, for whom the bridge is named, requested that the Marion County Board of Supervisors build a bridge near his property. In April of that year, they examined the site, and in June they contracted with S.F. Collins to build the Howe covered through truss bridge. He completed it later that year. The stream has been channelized so that the truss no longer spans the main water flow. In October 1977, a truck accident closed the bridge for two years, and it reopened in September 1979. The bridge was listed on the National Register of Historic Places in 1998. While it remains in place, a newer span was built to carry the vehicle traffic over the creek.
