= County Line Bridge (Columbus Junction, Iowa) =

- U.S. National Register of Historic Places
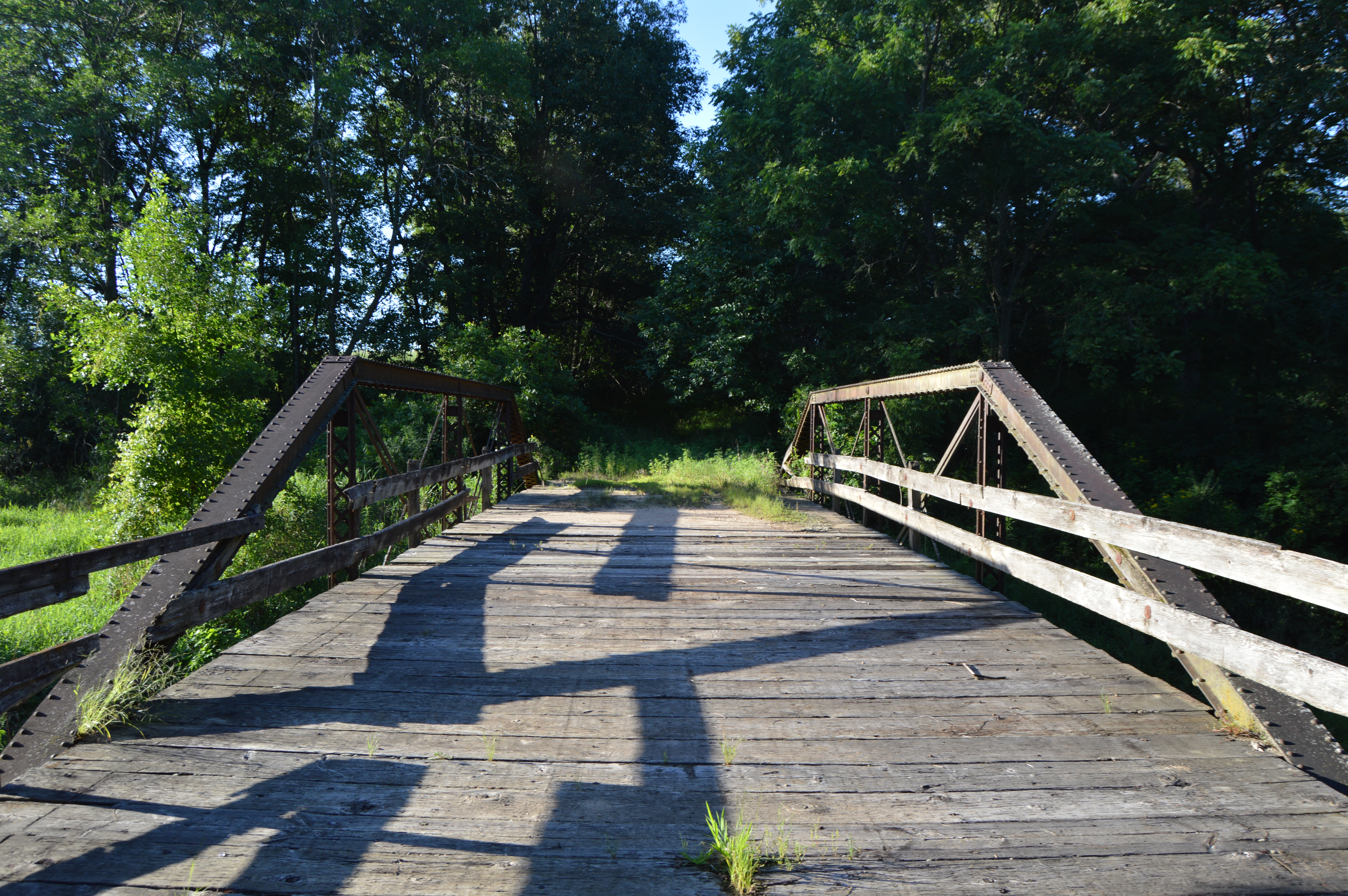

- Location within Iowa Location within the United States
- Location: 140th block of County Line Rd. over Long Creek
- Nearest city: Columbus Junction, Iowa
- Coordinates: 41°16′01″N 91°29′07″W
- Area: less than one acre
- Built: 1893
- Built by: Gillette-Herzog Manufacturing Company
- Architectural style: Pony truss
- NRHP reference No.: 98000513
- Added to NRHP: May 15, 1998

County Line Bridge is a historic structure located in a rural area west of Columbus Junction, Iowa, United States. The Louisa County Board of Supervisors approved the petition of Thomas Anwyl in April 1893 to build a bridge over Long Creek on the Louisa-Washington county line. They awarded a $1,174 contract to the Gillette-Herzog Manufacturing Company of Minneapolis to build two bridges. The second span was the Gipple's Quarry Bridge over Buffington Creek in Elm Grove Township. The bridge span is supported by cast iron columns that were manufactured by the Cast Iron Pile and Bridge Company of Keosauqua, Iowa. The steel components were rolled by Carnegie for Gillette-Herzog in Pittsburgh. The pony truss bridge is typical of those built in the same era in Iowa, however, like Gipple's Quarry Bridge it has an unusual lower chord configuration with end panels that slope downward from the bearing shoes to the center panels. It has subsequently been abandoned. The bridge was listed on the National Register of Historic Places in 1998.
