= Ten Mile Creek Bridge (Iowa) =

- Formerly listed on the U.S. National Register of Historic Places
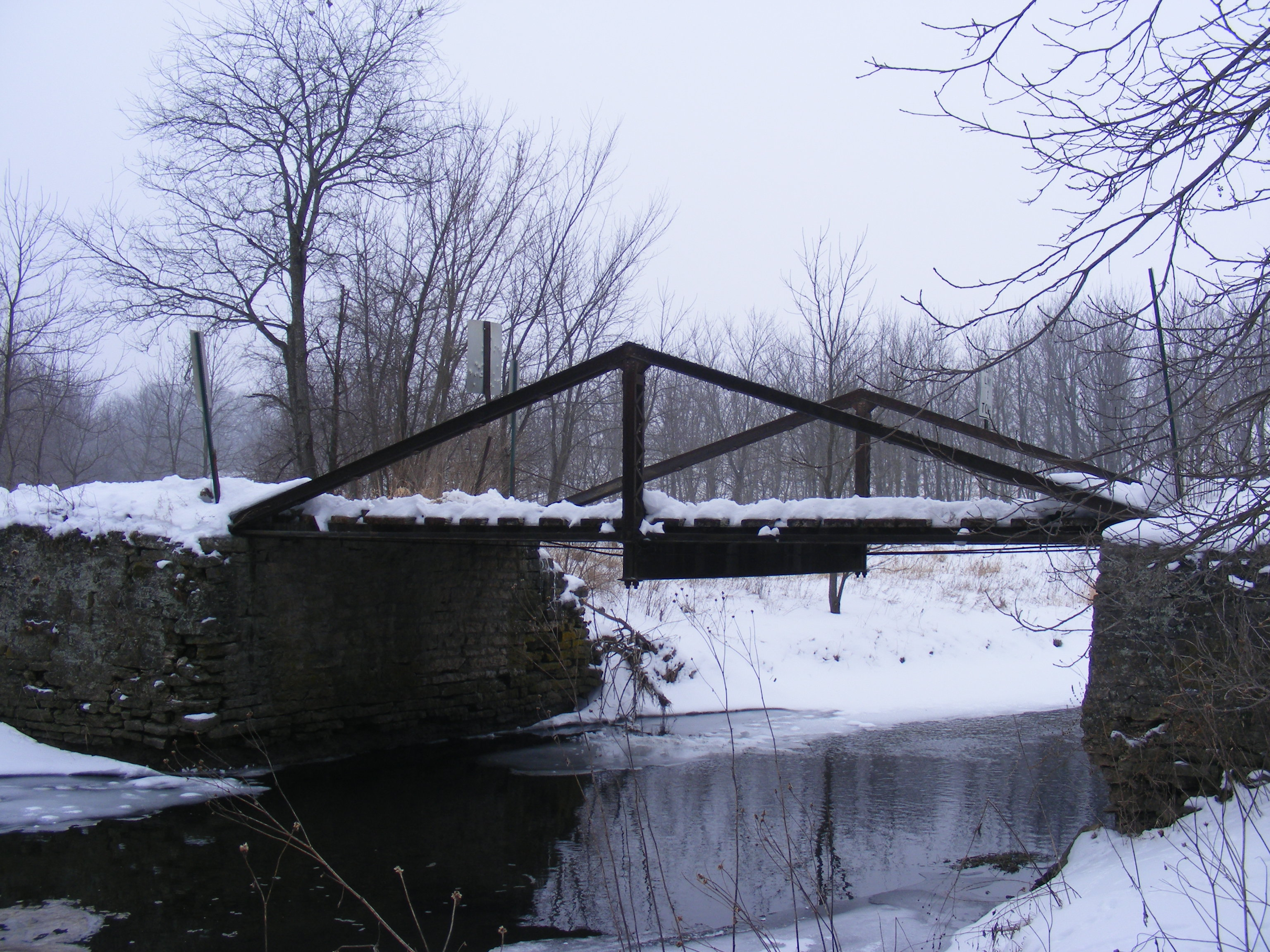

- Location within Iowa Location within the United States
- Location: Happy Hollow Road over Ten Mile Creek
- Nearest city: Decorah, Iowa
- Coordinates: 43°20′17″N 91°53′19″W
- Area: less than one acre
- Built: c. 1895
- Built by: R.D. Wheaton Bridge Company
- Architectural style: King post pony truss
- MPS: Highway Bridges of Iowa MPS
- NRHP reference No.: 98000466

Significant dates
- Added to NRHP: May 15, 1998
- Removed from NRHP: May 2, 2017

The Ten Mile Creek Bridge was a historic structure located northwest of Decorah, Iowa, United States. It spanned Ten Mile Creek for 36 feet (11 m). The R.D. Wheaton Bridge Company of Chicago supplied several king post truss bridges to Winneshiek County in the mid-1890s, and this is probably one of them. There are no county records specific to this bridge. It was listed on the National Register of Historic Places in 1998 and it was delisted in 2017.
