= CM and StP Railroad Underpass =

- U.S. National Register of Historic Places
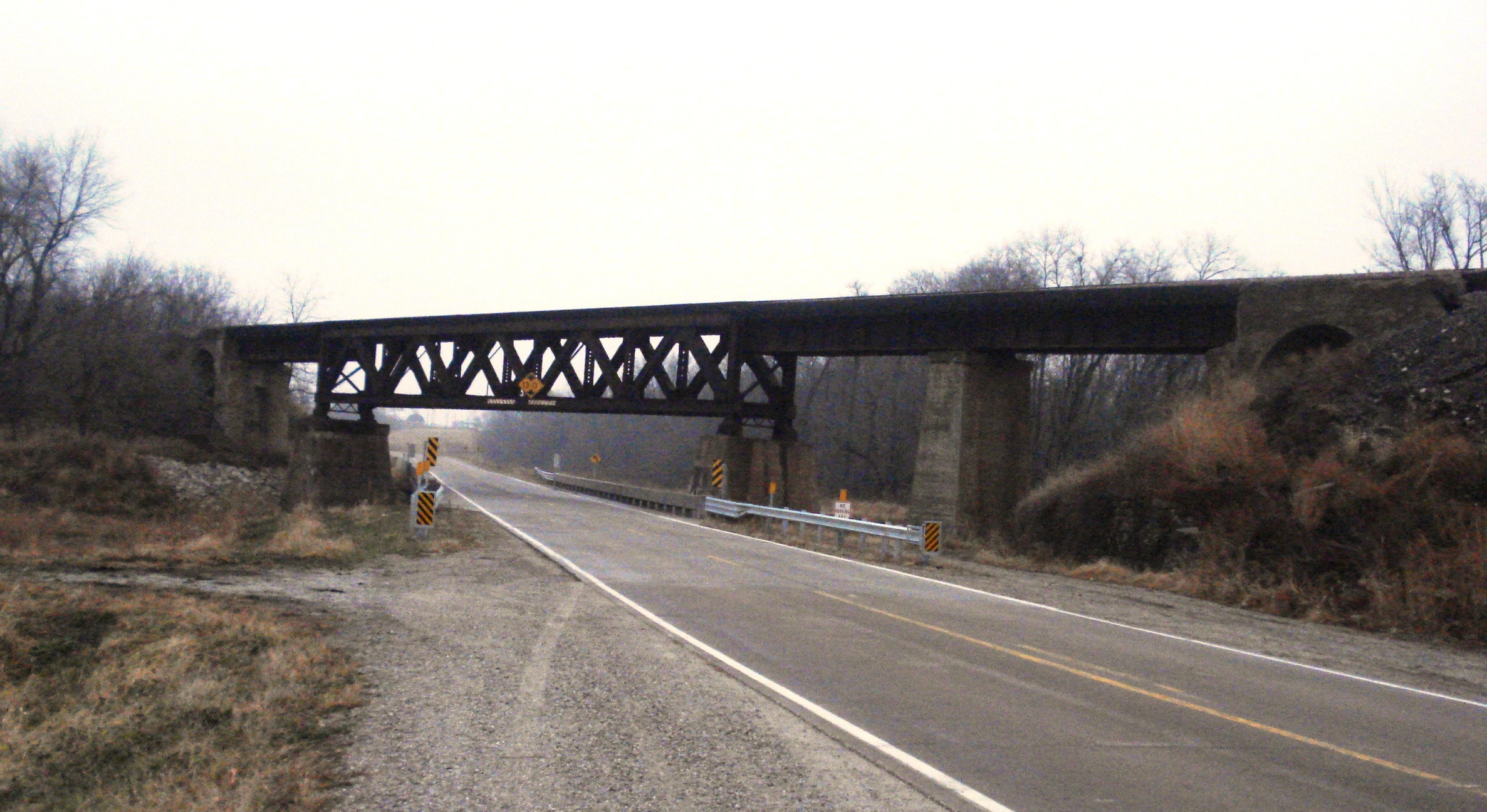

- Location within Iowa Location within the United States
- Location: County Road G38 over the Soo Railroad line
- Nearest city: Washington, Iowa
- Coordinates: 41°17′36″N 91°43′28″W
- Area: less than one acre
- Built: 1903
- Built by: Chicago, Milwaukee and St. Paul Railroad
- Architectural style: Riveted Warren deck truss
- NRHP reference No.: 98000469
- Added to NRHP: May 15, 1998

CM and StP Railroad Underpass is a historic structure located southwest of Washington, Iowa, United States. It was listed on the National Register of Historic Places in 1998. The Warren deck truss bridge is a rare example of this type of bridge in Iowa, and the oldest still in existence. Given the relatively flat nature of Iowa's rivers and streams this bridge type was rarely built in the state, and was mostly built for railroad use. This bridge, completed in 1903 by the Chicago, Milwaukee, St. Paul & Pacific Railroad (known as simply The Milwaukee Road), crosses a county highway bridge and the west fork of Crooked Creek.
