= Gipple's Quarry Bridge =

- U.S. National Register of Historic Places
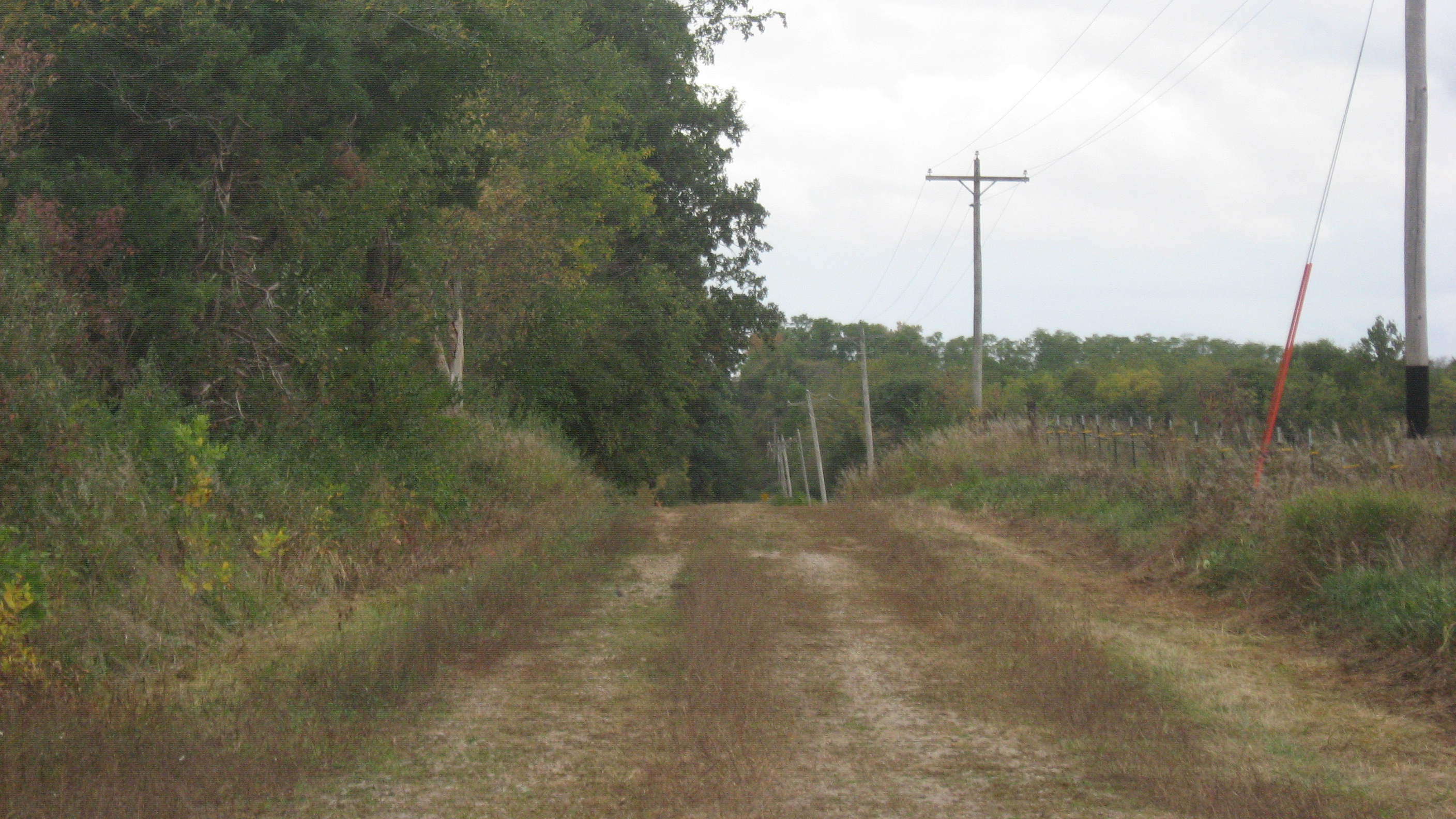
- Avenue V looking toward the bridge

- Location within Iowa Location within the United States
- Location: 100 block of V Ave. over Buffington Creek
- Nearest city: Columbus Junction, Iowa
- Coordinates: 41°12′17″N 91°24′31″W
- Area: less than one acre
- Built: 1893
- Built by: Gillette-Herzog Manufacturing Company
- Architectural style: Pony truss
- NRHP reference No.: 98000512
- Added to NRHP: May 15, 1998

Gipple's Quarry Bridge is a historic structure located in a rural area southwest of Columbus Junction, Iowa, United States. The Louisa County Board of Supervisors approved the petition of T.J. Gipple in April 1893 to replace a timber pile bridge over Buffington Creek, which was near his stone quarry. They awarded a $1,174 contract to the Gillette-Herzog Manufacturing Company of Minneapolis to build two bridges. The second span was the County Line Bridge over Long Creek in Columbus Township. The bridge span is supported by stone masonry abutments and piers. The steel components of the bridge were rolled by Carnegie, Gillette-Herzog in Pittsburgh. The pony truss bridge is typical of those built in the same era in Iowa, however, like County Line Bridge it has an unusual lower chord configuration with end panels that slope downward from the bearing shoes to the center panels. It has subsequently been abandoned. The bridge was listed on the National Register of Historic Places in 1998.
