= Harvey, Iowa =

- City
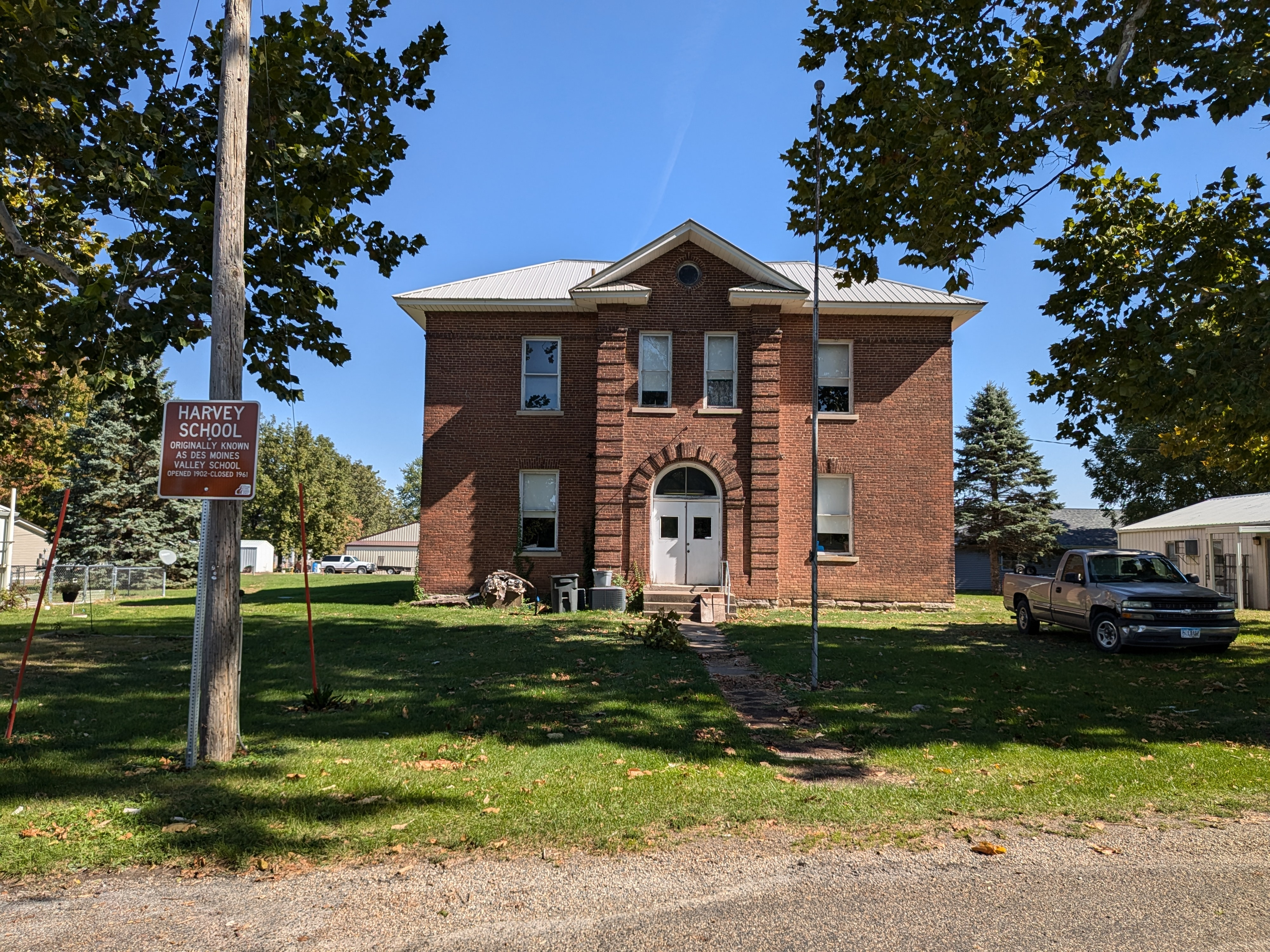
- The old school in Harvey

- Location of Harvey, Iowa
- Coordinates: 41°19′05″N 92°55′22″W
- Country: USA
- State: Iowa
- County: Marion

Area
  - Total: 0.68 sq mi (1.75 km^{2})
  - Land: 0.68 sq mi (1.75 km^{2})
  - Water: 0 sq mi (0.00 km^{2})
- Elevation: 709 ft (216 m)

Population (2020)
  - Total: 236
  - Density: 348.6/sq mi (134.59/km^{2})
- Time zone: UTC-6 (Central (CST))
  - Summer (DST): UTC-5 (CDT)
- ZIP code: 50119
- Area code: 641
- FIPS code: 19-34860
- GNIS feature ID: 2394318

Harvey is a city in Marion County, Iowa, United States. At the time of the 2020 census, its population was 236.

== Geography ==
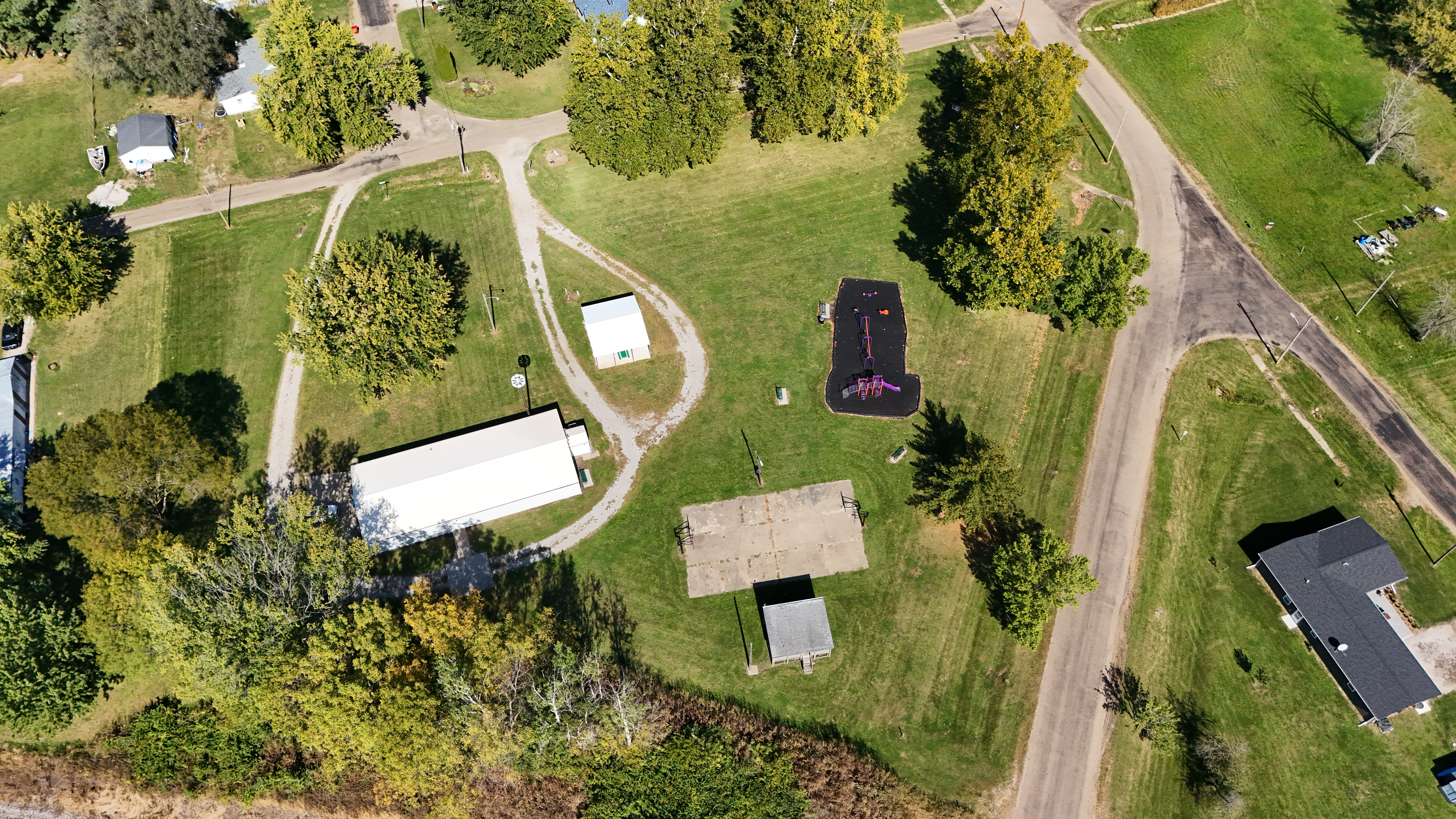
Orbra Geery Memorial Park in Harvey

According to the United States Census Bureau, the city has a total area of 0.68 square miles (1.76 km^{2}), all of it land.

== Demographics ==
Historical populations
Year	Pop.	±%
1910	346	—
1920	422	+22.0%
1930	348	−17.5%
1940	418	+20.1%
1950	346	−17.2%
1960	270	−22.0%
1970	217	−19.6%
1980	275	+26.7%
1990	235	−14.5%
2000	277	+17.9%
2010	235	−15.2%
2020	236	+0.4%
Source:"U.S. Census website". United States Census Bureau. and Iowa Data Center; Source: U.S. Decennial Census

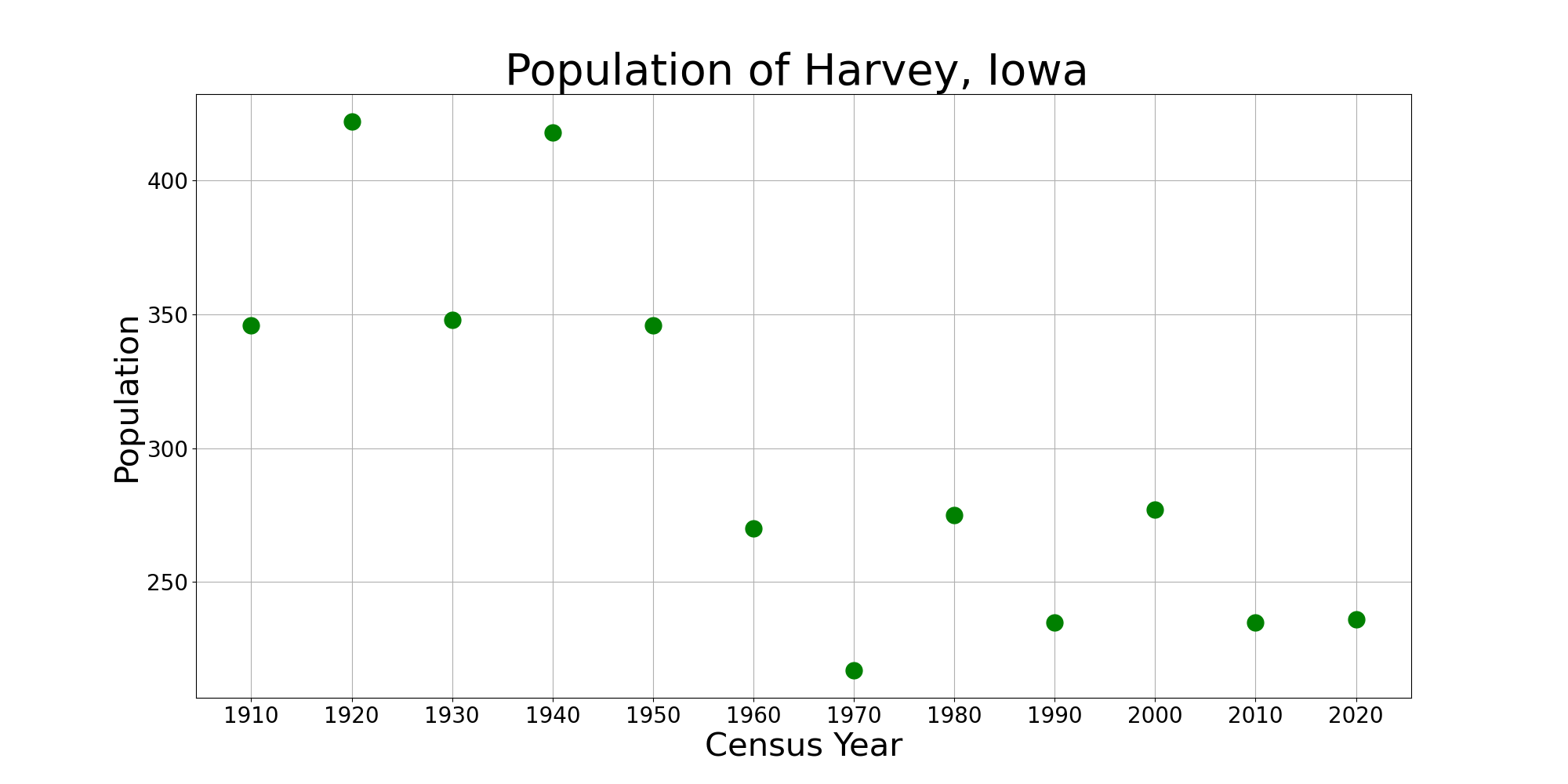
The population of Harvey, Iowa from US census data

=== 2020 census ===
As of the census of 2020, there were 236 people, 94 households, and 65 families residing in the city. The population density was 348.6 inhabitants per square mile (134.6/km^{2}). There were 118 housing units at an average density of 174.3 per square mile (67.3/km^{2}). The racial makeup of the city was 96.6% White, 0.0% Black or African American, 0.0% Native American, 0.0% Asian, 0.0% Pacific Islander, 0.0% from other races and 3.4% from two or more races. Hispanic or Latino persons of any race comprised 3.0% of the population.

Of the 94 households, 28.7% of which had children under the age of 18 living with them, 53.2% were married couples living together, 2.1% were cohabitating couples, 23.4% had a female householder with no spouse or partner present and 21.3% had a male householder with no spouse or partner present. 30.9% of all households were non-families. 27.7% of all households were made up of individuals, 10.6% had someone living alone who was 65 years old or older.

The median age in the city was 47.0 years. 22.0% of the residents were under the age of 20; 2.5% were between the ages of 20 and 24; 22.9% were from 25 and 44; 28.0% were from 45 and 64; and 24.6% were 65 years of age or older. The gender makeup of the city was 53.4% male and 46.6% female.

=== 2010 census ===
As of the census of 2010, there were 235 people, 109 households, and 63 families residing in the city. The population density was 345.6 inhabitants per square mile (133.4/km^{2}). There were 117 housing units at an average density of 172.1 per square mile (66.4/km^{2}). The racial makeup of the city was 97.4% White, 0.4% Native American, 1.3% Asian, and 0.9% from other races. Hispanic or Latino of any race were 0.9% of the population.

There were 109 households, of which 22.0% had children under the age of 18 living with them, 45.0% were married couples living together, 9.2% had a female householder with no husband present, 3.7% had a male householder with no wife present, and 42.2% were non-families. 36.7% of all households were made up of individuals, and 16.5% had someone living alone who was 65 years of age or older. The average household size was 2.16 and the average family size was 2.79.

The median age in the city was 44.9 years. 18.3% of residents were under the age of 18; 7.3% were between the ages of 18 and 24; 24.6% were from 25 to 44; 31.1% were from 45 to 64; and 18.7% were 65 years of age or older. The gender makeup of the city was 50.2% male and 49.8% female.

=== 2000 census ===
As of the census of 2000, there were 277 people, 111 households, and 79 families residing in the city. The population density was 408.2 inhabitants per square mile (157.6/km^{2}). There were 120 housing units at an average density of 176.8 per square mile (68.3/km^{2}). The racial makeup of the city was 99.64% White and 0.36% African American.

There were 111 households, out of which 33.3% had children under the age of 18 living with them, 58.6% were married couples living together, 10.8% had a female householder with no husband present, and 28.8% were non-families. 22.5% of all households were made up of individuals, and 7.2% had someone living alone who was 65 years of age or older. The average household size was 2.50 and the average family size was 2.92.

In the city, the population was spread out, with 23.8% under the age of 18, 11.6% from 18 to 24, 31.4% from 25 to 44, 21.7% from 45 to 64, and 11.6% who were 65 years of age or older. The median age was 35 years. For every 100 females, there were 102.2 males. For every 100 females age 18 and over, there were 108.9 males.

The median income for a household in the city was $34,688, and the median income for a family was $35,536. Males had a median income of $32,000 versus $25,000 for females. The per capita income for the city was $12,770. 19.2% of the population and 18.7% of families were below the poverty line, including 14.5% of those under the age of 18 and 21.4% of those 65 and older.

== Education ==
The Knoxville Community School District operates local public schools.
