= Old Peru, Iowa =

- Unincorporated community
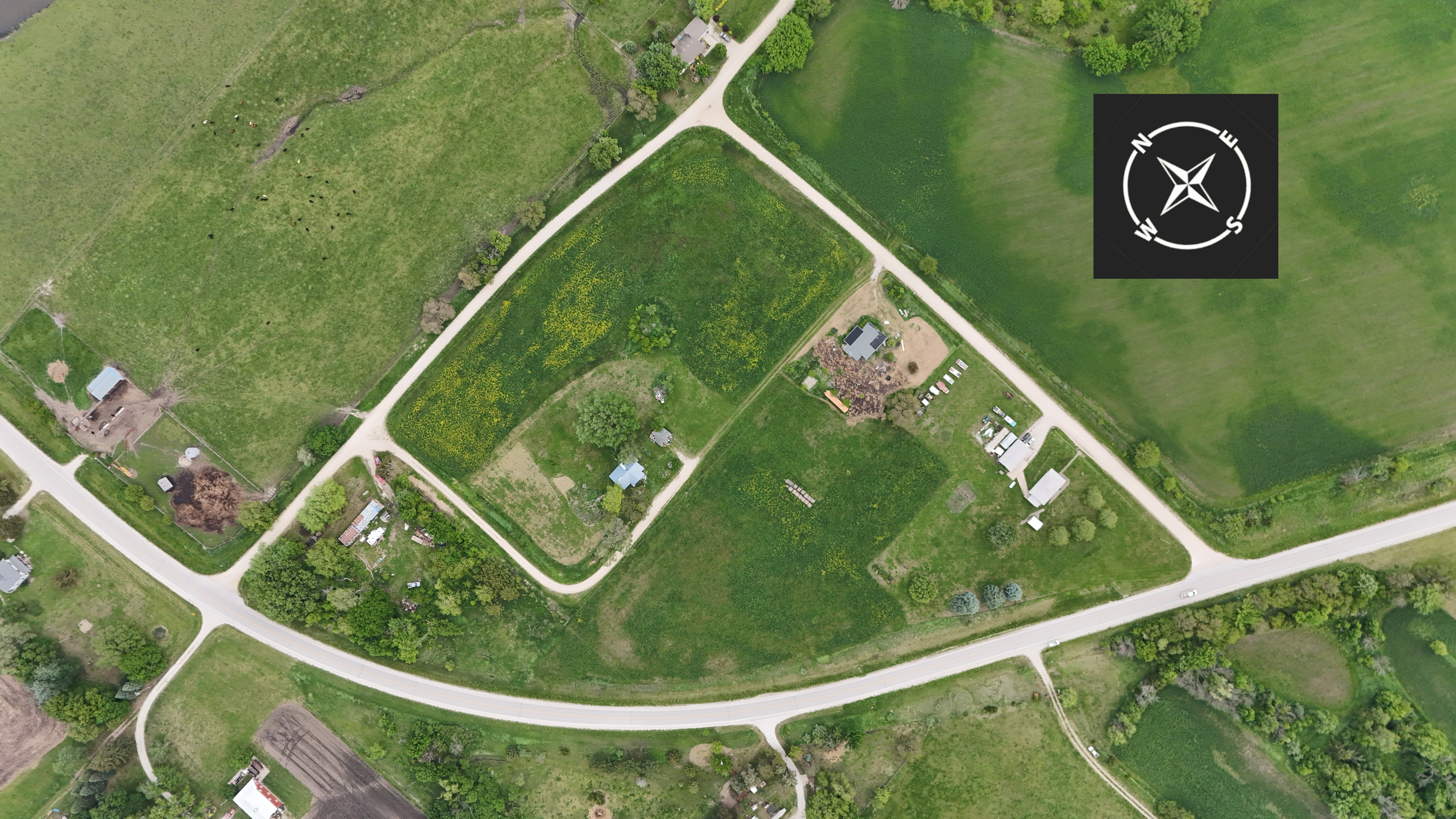
- An aerial view of Old Peru, Iowa

- Location within Iowa Location within the United States
- Coordinates: 41°14′9″N 93°56′43″W
- Country: United States
- State: Iowa
- County: Madison
- Elevation: 1,122 ft (342 m)
- Time zone: UTC-6 (Central (CST))
  - Summer (DST): UTC-5 (CDT)
- GNIS feature ID: 459832

Old Peru (also Peru, pronounced PEE-roo) is an unincorporated community in Madison County, Iowa, United States. Its elevation is 1,122 feet (342 m). Although Old Peru is unincorporated, it once had a post office under the name of Peru; the office was established on 18 April 1853 and closed on 14 September 1903. Even though the community's post office has been closed for over a century, ZIP Code 50222 is still reserved for Peru.

Old Peru was laid out as a town in 1855, but it declined when the railroad missed it by a mile, and in 1887 the town of East Peru was founded on that line.

The original (seedling) delicious apple tree grew in Peru.
