= Des Moines River Bridge (Humboldt, Iowa) =

- Formerly listed on the U.S. National Register of Historic Places
- Location within Iowa Location within the United States
- Nearest city: Humboldt, Iowa
- Coordinates: 42°43′55″N 94°15′28″W
- Area: Humboldt County
- Built: 1939
- Architect: E.A. Cramme Co.
- Architectural style: Plate girder bridge
- MPS: Highway Bridges of Iowa
- NRHP reference No.: 98000522

Significant dates
- Added to NRHP: May 15, 1998
- Removed from NRHP: September 19, 2019

The Des Moines River Bridge in Humboldt, Iowa was a plate girder bridge built in 1939 located in Humboldt County, Iowa. It carried Iowa Highway 3 over the West Fork of the Des Moines River for 403.2 feet (122.9 m). It was listed on the National Register of Historic Places (NRHP) in 1998. The bridge was rated functionally obsolete in 2008 and was replaced in 2010. It was removed from the NRHP in 2019.
