= Littleport, Iowa =

- Unincorporated Community
- Location of Littleport, Iowa
- Coordinates: 42°45′13″N 91°22′8″W
- Country: United States
- State: Iowa
- County: Clayton

Area
  - Total: 0.35 sq mi (0.9 km^{2})
  - Land: 0.35 sq mi (0.9 km^{2})
  - Water: 0 sq mi (0.0 km^{2})
- Elevation: 712 ft (217 m)

Population (2000)
  - Total: 26
  - Density: 78/sq mi (30.1/km^{2})
- Time zone: UTC-6 (Central (CST))
  - Summer (DST): UTC-5 (CDT)
- ZIP code: 52055
- Area code: 563
- FIPS code: 19-45750
- GNIS feature ID: 0458533

Littleport is an unincorporated community and former city in Clayton County, Iowa, United States. After the Volga River flood of May 16, 1999, much of the town was destroyed and most residents moved away. At the 2000 Census, there were 26 residents. As of the 1960 Census, there had been 119 residents. There had been 139 people in 1950 and more than 200 people in 1916. The town was laid out in 1857 by Dennis Quigley and platted on May 21, 1860, but remained of little importance until the coming of the railroad in 1874. The town was not officially incorporated until 1907. Around this time, it had three general stores, a bank, blacksmith shop, Catholic church (built in 1909; torn down in 1990), German Lutheran church (damaged by the May 1999 Volga River flood and later moved to higher ground), an independent school district and a creamery. Somewhat later, it also had two taverns. It was officially disincorporated in 2005.

== Demographics ==
Historical population
Census	Pop.	Note	%±
1910	166		—
1920	191		15.1%
1930	203		6.3%
1940	170		−16.3%
1950	139		−18.2%
1960	119		−14.4%
1970	97		−18.5%
1980	106		9.3%
1990	88		−17.0%
2000	26		−70.5%
U.S. Decennial Census

At the 2000 census, there were 26 people, 13 households and 8 families residing in the city. The population density was 78.0 inhabitants per square mile (30.1/km^{2}). There were 14 housing units at an average density of 42.0 per square mile (16.2/km^{2}). The racial makeup of the city was 100.00% White.

There were 13 households, of which 23.1% had children under the age of 18 living with them, 61.5% were married couples living together, 7.7% had a female householder with no husband present, and 30.8% were non-families. 30.8% of all households were made up of individuals, and 15.4% had someone living alone who was 65 years of age or older. The average household size was 2.00 and the average family size was 2.44.

15.4% of the populace were under the age of 18, 15.4% from 25 to 44, 26.9% from 45 to 64, and 42.3% who were 65 years of age or older. The median age was 54 years. For every 100 females, there were 85.7 males. For every 100 females age 18 and over, there were 83.3 males.

The median household income was $23,125, and the median family income was $46,250. Males had a median income of $51,250 versus $13,750 for females. The per capita income for the city was $16,237. There were no families and 15.8% of the population living below the poverty line, including no under eighteens and 20.0% of those over 64.

== Education ==
Central Community School District of Elkader operates public schools serving the community.

== See also ==
- List of Discontinued cities in Iowa
