= Main Street Bridge (Charles City, Iowa) =

- U.S. National Register of Historic Places
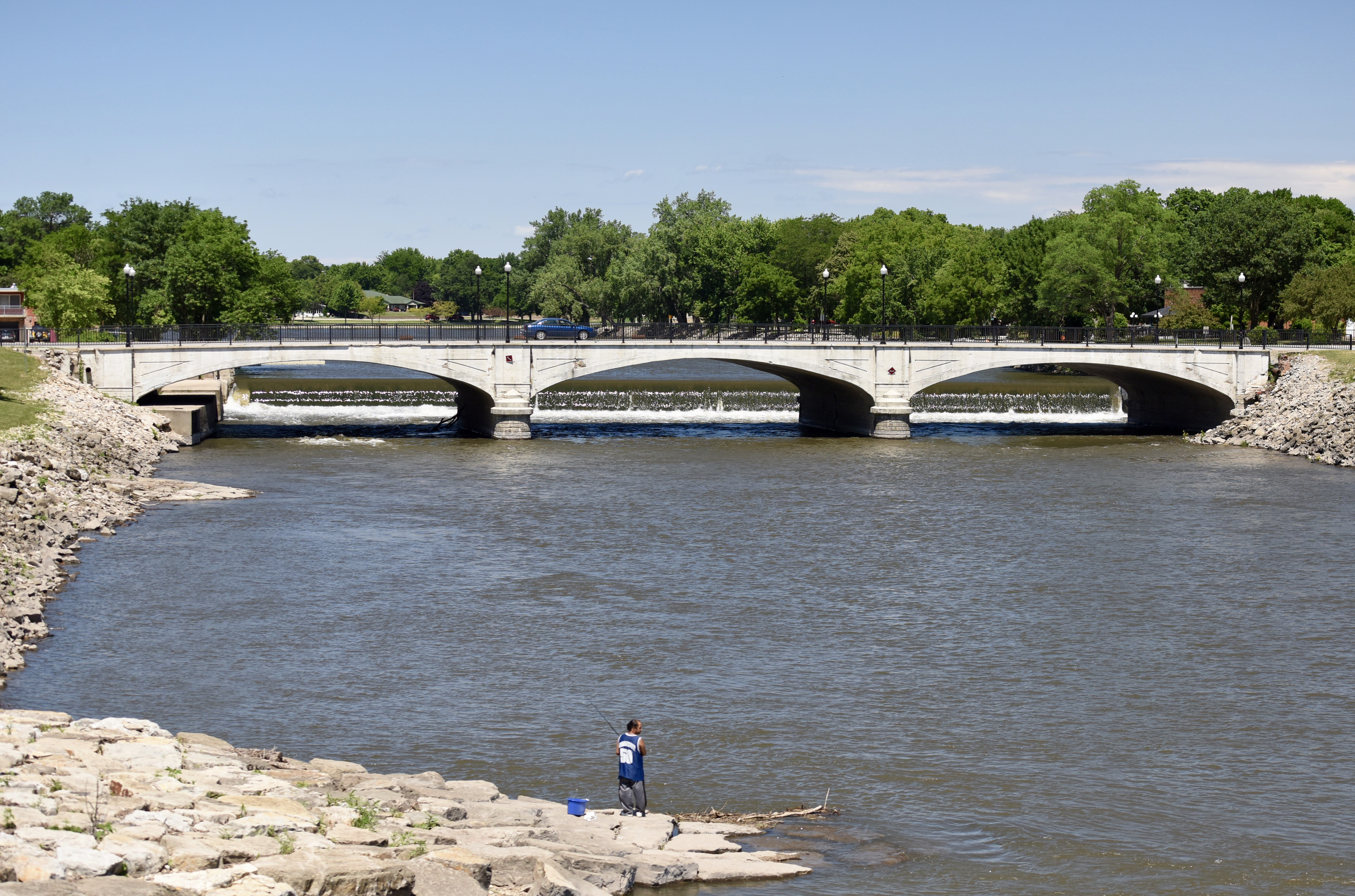

- Location within Iowa Location within the United States
- Location: Main St. over the Cedar River, Charles City, Iowa
- Coordinates: 43°03′58″N 92°40′48″W
- Built: 1909-1910
- Built by: Advance Construction Co.
- Architect: G.W. Miller
- Architectural style: Closed-spandrel arch bridge
- MPS: Highway Bridges of Iowa MPS
- NRHP reference No.: 99000311
- Added to NRHP: March 12, 1999

The Main Street Bridge is a historic structure located in Charles City, Iowa, United States. It spans the Cedar River for 248 feet (76 m). Before a bridge was built at this location local citizens would cross the river by way of a ferry, at a ford in summer, and across the ice in winter. The first bridge at this location was washed away in a flood while it was under construction in 1858. The second bridge was completed in 1864, and it was destroyed in a flood two years later. A temporary bridge was completed in 1867, and it was replaced by a truss bridge in 1870. It was used for 40 years despite an engineer's study in 1892 that suggested it be condemned. The Floyd County Board of Supervisors approved a replacement bridge in 1908. The old bridge was moved to a new spot five blocks downstream, but contract problems delayed construction of the new bridge. Advance Construction Company of Waukesha, Wisconsin was finally awarded a contract in March 1909. The three span concrete filled spandrel arch bridge was designed by their designing engineer G.W. Miller. It was completed in 1910 for about $40,000, which was paid for by the county and the city. The bridge was listed on the National Register of Historic Places in 1999.
