= Otter Creek Bridge (Oelwein, Iowa) =

- U.S. National Register of Historic Places
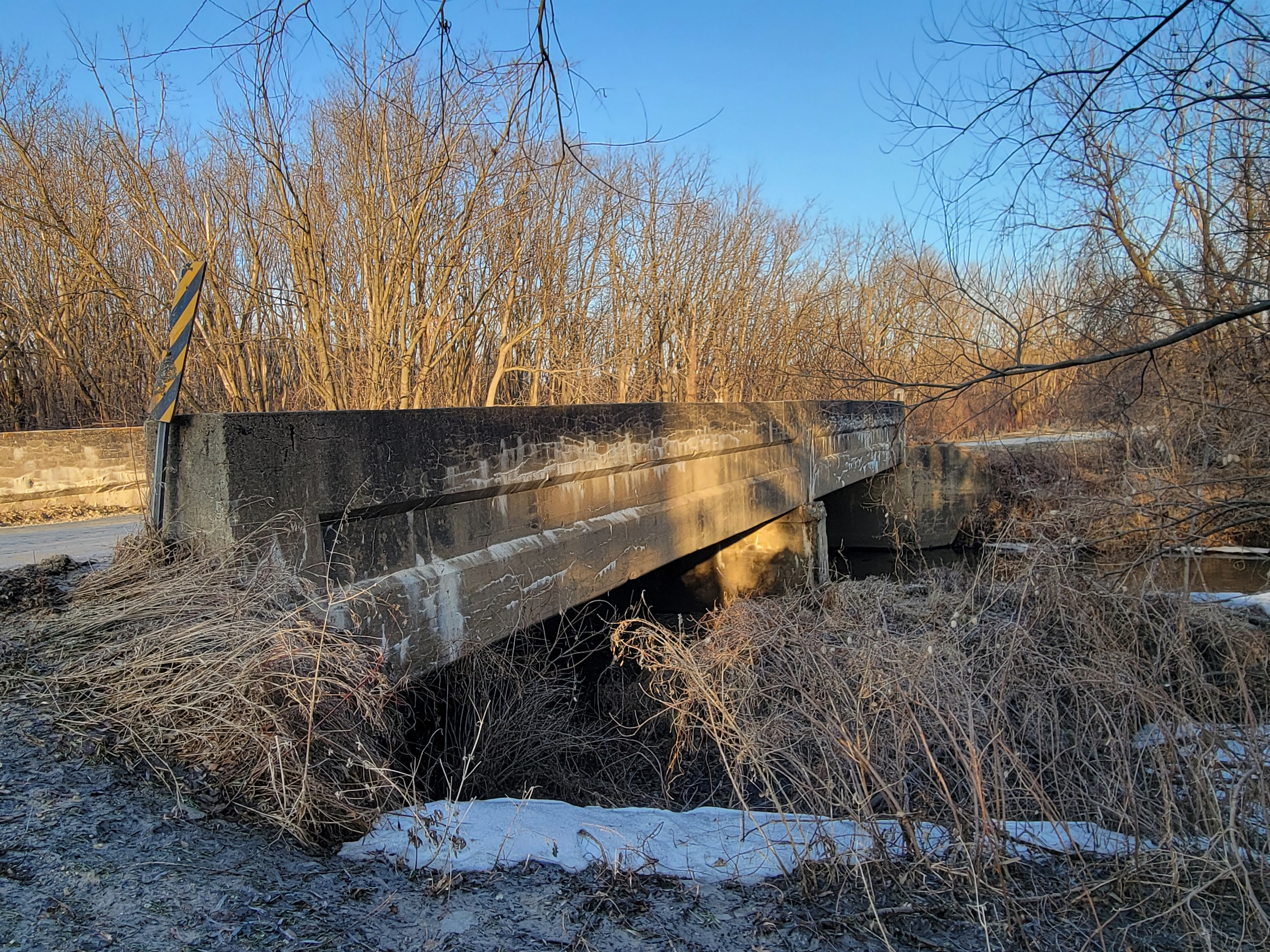
- Otter Creek Bridge in 2026

- Location within Iowa Location within the United States
- Location: 40th Street over Otter Creek
- Nearest city: Oelwein, Iowa
- Coordinates: 42°41′09.6″N 91°56′49.8″W
- Built: 1917
- Built by: County work force
- Architect: Iowa State Highway Commission
- Architectural style: Girder bridge
- MPS: Highway Bridges of Iowa MPS
- NRHP reference No.: 98000781
- Added to NRHP: June 25, 1998

Otter Creek Bridge is a historic structure located northwest of Oelwein, Iowa, United States. It spans Otter Creek for 86 feet (26 m). In July 1917, the Fayette County Board of Supervisors chose this bridge design for a concrete through girder bridge from the Iowa State Highway Commission, and put the project out to bid. When no one bid on the job they decided to use day laborers to build the bridge. It was completed later in 1917 for $5,153.88. The bridge was listed on the National Register of Historic Places in 1998.
