= National Register of Historic Places listings in Cerro Gordo County, Iowa =

Location of Cerro Gordo County in Iowa

This is a list of the National Register of Historic Places listings in Cerro Gordo County, Iowa.

This is intended to be a complete list of the properties and districts on the National Register of Historic Places in Cerro Gordo County, Iowa, United States. Latitude and longitude coordinates are provided for many National Register properties and districts; these locations may be seen together in a map.

There are 47 properties and districts listed on the National Register in the county, one of which is a National Historic Landmark.

This National Park Service list is complete through NPS recent listings posted March 21, 2025.

	Name on the Register	Image	Date listed	Location	City or town	Description
1	A.J. Andrus Duplex	A.J. Andrus Duplex	January 29, 1980 (#80001431)	687-691 E. State St. 43°09′05″N 93°11′14″W	Mason City	
2	Amaziah and Cornelia (Wait) Cannon House	Amaziah and Cornelia (Wait) Cannon House	August 25, 2004 (#04000899)	1581 N. Eisenhower Ave. 43°10′02″N 93°15′37″W	Mason City	
3	City National Bank Building	City National Bank Building	September 14, 1972 (#72000469)	4 S. Federal Ave. 43°09′06″N 93°12′05″W	Mason City	
4	Clear Lake Lake Wall		January 3, 2023 (#100008506)	10 North Lake View Dr. 43°08′07″N 93°23′03″W	Clear Lake	
5	East Park Band Shell	East Park Band Shell	October 14, 2009 (#09000825)	E. State St. between N. Carolina Ave. and N. Kentucky Ave. 43°09′14″N 93°11′01″W	Mason City	
6	East Park Historic District	East Park Historic District	October 15, 2014 (#14000855)	Roughly bounded by the Winnebago R., N. Carolina, N. Kentucky & N. Virginia Aves., CPRR tracks, E. State St. 43°09′20″N 93°11′02″W	Mason City	
7	William C. and Margaret Egloff House	William C. and Margaret Egloff House	May 1, 2017 (#100000934)	310 E. State St. 43°09′07″N 93°11′45″W	Mason City	
8	Elks-Rogers Hotel	Elks-Rogers Hotel	June 21, 1982 (#82002611)	223 Main Ave. 43°08′08″N 93°22′54″W	Clear Lake	
9	Elmwood-St. Joseph Municipal Cemetery Historic District		June 7, 2018 (#100002541)	1224 S Washington Ave. 43°08′23″N 93°12′18″W	Mason City	
10	John L. Etzel House	John L. Etzel House	January 27, 1983 (#83000347)	214 N. 3rd St. 43°08′17″N 93°23′02″W	Clear Lake	
11	First Church of Christ Scientist	First Church of Christ Scientist	October 30, 1997 (#97001285)	23 3rd St., NW. 43°09′16″N 93°12′08″W	Mason City	
12	First National Bank of Mason City	First National Bank of Mason City	May 2, 1997 (#97000392)	5-7 N. Federal Ave. 43°09′07″N 93°12′03″W	Mason City	
13	Forest Park Historic District	Forest Park Historic District	January 20, 2015 (#14001167)	Roughly bounded by Willow Cr., Crescent & Linden Drs., State St., S. Pierce & N. Taylor Aves., 1st St. SW. 43°09′14″N 93°13′02″W	Mason City	
14	C.F. Franke House	C.F. Franke House	January 29, 1980 (#80001432)	320 1st St., SE. 43°09′04″N 93°11′43″W	Mason City	
15	E.R. Gibson House	E.R. Gibson House	January 29, 1980 (#80001433)	114 4th St., NW. 43°09′20″N 93°12′12″W	Mason City	
16	Hotel Lester-Lester Cafe	Hotel Lester-Lester Cafe	December 20, 2002 (#02001543)	408-410 2nd St., NW. 43°09′14″N 93°12′28″W	Mason City	
17	Jewell Apartments	Jewell Apartments	January 29, 1980 (#80001434)	404-412 1st St., NW. 43°09′10″N 93°12′28″W	Mason City	
18	Keerl-Decker House	Keerl-Decker House	December 20, 2002 (#02001537)	119 2nd St., SE. 43°08′59″N 93°11′55″W	Mason City	
19	The Kirk	The Kirk	April 12, 1982 (#82002613)	206 N. Federal Ave. 43°09′14″N 93°12′05″W	Mason City	
20	Lippert House	Lippert House	January 29, 1980 (#80001435)	122-124 N. Madison Ave. 43°09′12″N 93°12′28″W	Mason City	
21	Mason City Downtown Historic District	Mason City Downtown Historic District	September 8, 2005 (#05000956)	Roughly bounded by N. 46th St., Georgia Ave., Washington Ave., and S. 2nd St. 43°09′10″N 93°12′04″W	Mason City	
22	Mason City Engine House No. 2		November 8, 2022 (#100008368)	2020 South Federal Ave. 43°07′54″N 93°12′05″W	Mason City	
23	Mason City Public Library	Mason City Public Library	May 25, 1989 (#89000405)	208 E. State St. 43°09′07″N 93°11′51″W	Mason City	
24	Mason City YMCA	Mason City YMCA	May 2, 2002 (#02000426)	15 N. Pennsylvania; 43°09′09″N 93°11′51″W	Mason City	
25	MBA (Modern Brotherhood of America) Building	MBA (Modern Brotherhood of America) Building	September 12, 2002 (#02001021)	103 E. State St. 43°09′04″N 93°11′57″W	Mason City	
26	F.M. Norris House		January 29, 1980 (#80001436)	108 4th St., NE. 43°09′20″N 93°11′56″W	Mason City	
27	Park Inn Hotel	Park Inn Hotel	September 14, 1972 (#72000470)	15 W. State St. 43°09′06″N 93°12′06″W	Mason City	
28	Parker's Opera House	Parker's Opera House	November 20, 1998 (#98001325)	23 N. Federal Ave. 43°09′09″N 93°12′02″W	Mason City	
29	Parker's Woods Park Historic District	Parker's Woods Park Historic District	October 15, 2014 (#14000856)	N. Jackson Ave. between 1st & 4th Sts., NW. 43°09′15″N 93°12′45″W	Mason City	
30	Rock Crest – Rock Glen Historic District	Rock Crest – Rock Glen Historic District	December 28, 1979 (#79000885)	Off U.S. Route 18; 43°09′02″N 93°11′32″W	Mason City	
31	Rock Falls Bridge		June 25, 1998 (#98000742)	Spring St. over the Shell Rock River; 43°12′24″N 93°05′04″W	Rock Falls	
32	Rogers-Knutson House	Rogers-Knutson House	September 9, 1982 (#82002612)	315 N. 3rd St. 43°08′19″N 93°23′07″W	Clear Lake	
33	George Romey House	George Romey House	January 29, 1980 (#80001437)	428 1st St., SE. 43°09′04″N 93°11′36″W	Mason City	
34	Duncan Rule House	Duncan Rule House	October 16, 1979 (#79000886)	321 2nd St., SE. 43°08′59″N 93°11′43″W	Mason City	
35	Chris Rye House	Chris Rye House	January 29, 1980 (#80001438)	630 E. State St. 43°09′04″N 93°11′36″W	Mason City	
36	St. John Baptist Church	St. John Baptist Church	January 24, 2002 (#01001484)	715 6th St., SW. 43°08′46″N 93°12′45″W	Mason City	
37	Charles Seney House	Charles Seney House	January 29, 1980 (#80001439)	109 7th St., NW. and 622 N. Washington St. 43°09′29″N 93°12′11″W	Mason City	
38	C.P. Shipley House		January 29, 1980 (#80001440)	114 3rd St., NW. 43°09′17″N 93°12′11″W	Mason City	
39	State Street Bridge	State Street Bridge	June 25, 1998 (#98000740)	E. State St. over Willow Creek; 43°09′07″N 93°11′30″W	Mason City	
40	Stewart Avenue Bridge	Stewart Avenue Bridge	June 25, 1998 (#98000741)	North Carolina Ave. over the Winnebago River; 43°09′24″N 93°11′25″W	Mason City	
41	Dr. G.C. Stockman House	Dr. G.C. Stockman House	September 17, 1992 (#80001441)	311 1st St., SE. 43°09′09″N 93°11′32″W	Mason City	
42	Surf Ballroom	Surf Ballroom	September 6, 2011 (#10000261)	460 N Shore Dr; 43°08′24″N 93°23′22″W	Clear Lake	
43	Wagner-Mozart Music Hall		November 16, 1978 (#78001210)	1st St., NE. and Delaware Ave. 43°09′09″N 93°11′56″W	Mason City	
44	Winnebago River Bridge	Winnebago River Bridge	June 25, 1998 (#98000812)	U.S. Route 65 over the Winnebago River; 43°11′35″N 93°12′36″W	Mason City	
45	Mier Wolf House	Mier Wolf House	January 29, 1980 (#80001442)	811 N. Adams St. 43°09′34″N 93°12′14″W	Mason City	
46	Curtis Yelland House	Curtis Yelland House	January 29, 1980 (#80001443)	37 River Heights Dr. 43°08′55″N 93°11′38″W	Mason City	
47	Tessa Youngblood House	Tessa Youngblood House	January 29, 1980 (#80001444)	36 Oak Dr. 43°09′06″N 93°12′51″W	Mason City	

== See also ==
- List of National Historic Landmarks in Iowa
- National Register of Historic Places listings in Iowa
- Listings in neighboring counties: Floyd, Franklin, Hancock, Mitchell, Worth
