= State Street Bridge =

State Street Bridge may refer to:

- Bataan-Corregidor Memorial Bridge, carrying State Street across the Chicago River in Chicago, Illinois
- State Street Bridge (Mason City, Iowa), listed on the National Register of Historic Places (NRHP) in Cerro Gordo County, Iowa
- State Street Bridge (Bridgeport, Michigan), NRHP-listed in Saginaw County, Michigan
- State Street Bridge (Harrisburg, Pennsylvania)
