= Stewart Avenue =

Stewart Avenue may refer to:

== Roads ==
- Metropolitan Parkway (Atlanta), Major formerly known as Stewart Avenue in Atlanta, Georgia, United States
- Stewart Avenue (Nassau County, New York), Major road in Nassau County, New York, United States, primarily serving Garden City and its vicinity

== Structures ==
- Stewart Avenue Bridge, A landmarked bridge in Mason City, Iowa, United States
