= Lippert (disambiguation) =

Lippert is a surname. It may also refer to:

- Lippert Pictures, an American company that released 130 films between 1948 and 1955
- Lippert Peak, Ellsworth Land, Antarctica
- Lippert Lake, Carver County, Minnesota

== See also ==
- Lippert House, Mason City, Iowa, on the National Register of Historic Places
