= Rock Falls Bridge =

- U.S. National Register of Historic Places
- Location within Iowa Location within the United States
- Location: Spring Street over the Shell Rock River; Rock Falls, Iowa
- Coordinates: 43°12′24″N 93°05′04″W
- Area: less than one acre
- Built: 1929
- Built by: C.A. Holvik
- Architect: Iowa State Highway Commission
- Architectural style: Spandrel arch
- MPS: Highway Bridges of Iowa MPS
- NRHP reference No.: 98000742
- Added to NRHP: June 25, 1998

The Rock Falls Bridge is a historic structure located in Rock Falls, in the north-central part of the U.S. state of Iowa. The span carries Spring Street over the Shell Rock River for 142 feet (43 m). The Iowa State Highway Commission prepared the plans for this bridge in September 1928, and they were revised in February 1929. While they designed riveted steel trusses for medium-span bridges in rural areas, they used concrete open spandrel arches like this one for several urban and small town structures in the 1920s. C.A. Holvik of Mason City was awarded the contract to construct the bridge, which they completed later in 1929. It was listed on the National Register of Historic Places in 1998.

== See also ==
- List of bridges on the National Register of Historic Places in Iowa
- National Register of Historic Places listings in Cerro Gordo County, Iowa
