= Twin Bridge (Fayette, Iowa) =

- U.S. National Register of Historic Places
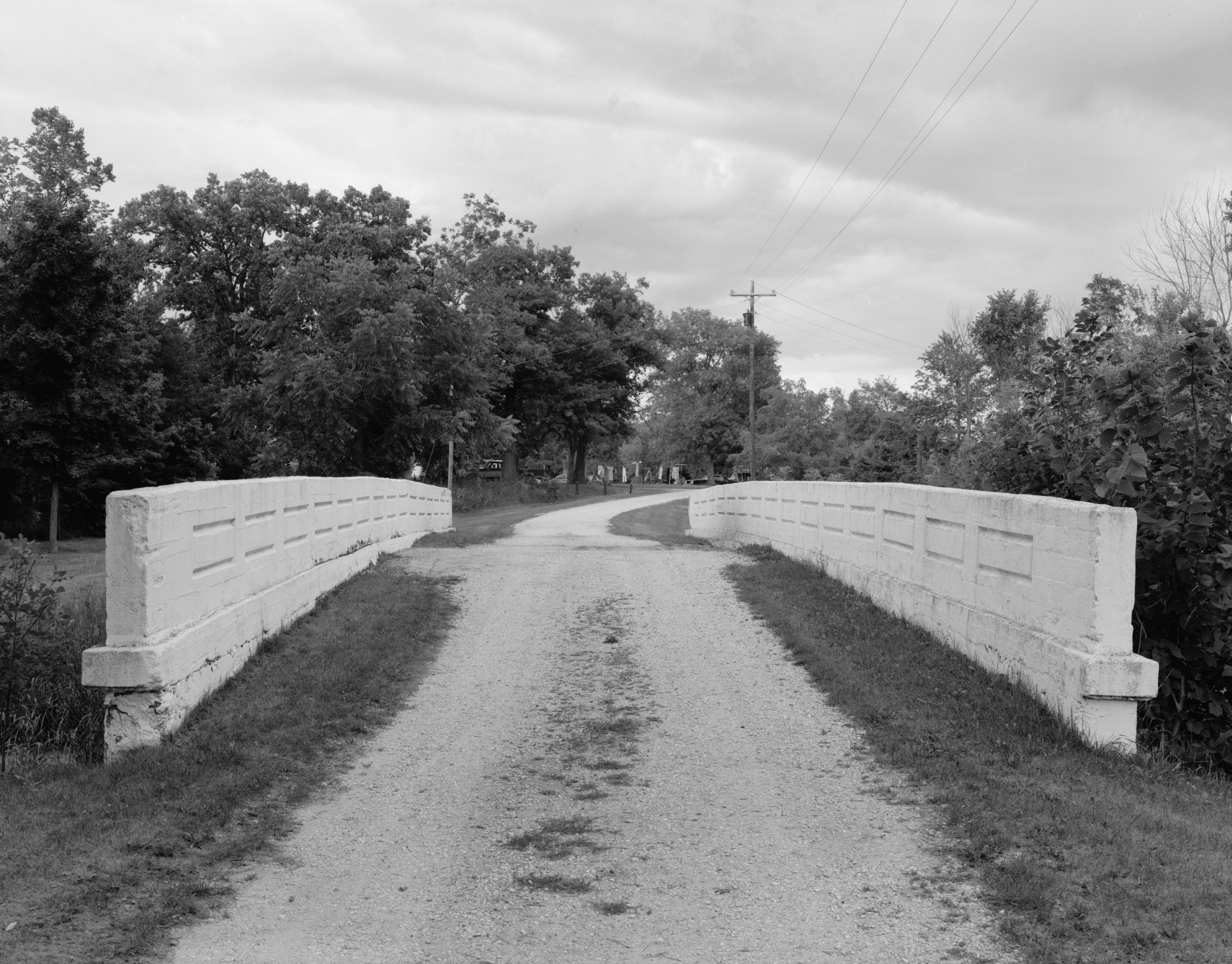

- Location within Iowa Location within the United States
- Location: 130th Street over the Little Volga River
- Nearest city: Fayette, Iowa
- Coordinates: 42°49′04.4″N 91°52′41.4″W
- Built: 1910
- Built by: N. M. Stark and Company
- Architectural style: Luten arch
- MPS: Highway Bridges of Iowa MPS
- NRHP reference No.: 98000779
- Added to NRHP: June 25, 1998

The Twin Bridge is a historic structure located in Twin Bridge Park southwest of Fayette, Iowa, United States. It spans the Little Volga River for 80 feet (24 m). The Fayette County Board of Supervisors contracted with N. M. Stark and Company of Des Moines to build almost all of its bridges between 1900 and 1913. This concrete Luten arch bridge was completed in about 1910 using a patented design by Indianapolis engineer Daniel Luten. Stark was a licensee for Luten and they built multiple bridges using his designs under a patent royalty agreement. The Twin Bridge was listed on the National Register of Historic Places in 1998.

== See also ==
- List of bridges documented by the Historic American Engineering Record in Iowa
