= Eighth Street Bridge (Sioux Falls, South Dakota) =

- U.S. National Register of Historic Places
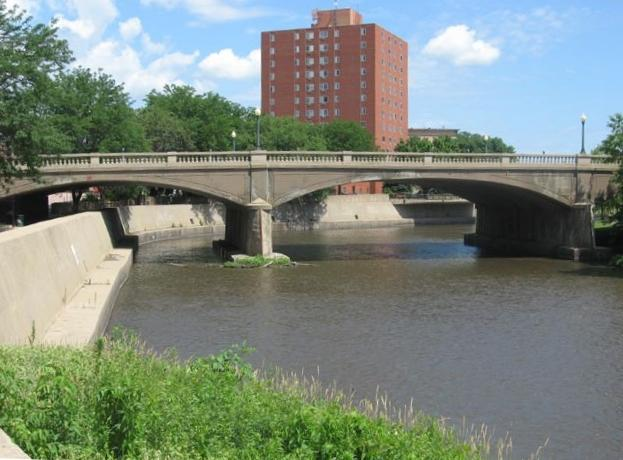

- Location within South Dakota Location within the United States
- Location: S. Eighth St. over the Big Sioux R., Sioux Falls, South Dakota
- Coordinates: 43°32′55″N 96°43′31″W
- Area: less than one acre
- Built: 1912; 114 years ago
- Built by: Stark, N.M., and Company
- Architectural style: Arch
- MPS: Historic Bridges in South Dakota MPS
- NRHP reference No.: 93001308
- Added to NRHP: December 9, 1993

The Eighth Street Bridge in Sioux Falls, South Dakota brings S. Eighth St. over the Big Sioux River. It is a triple-arch concrete deck arch bridge that was built in 1912 by N.M. Stark and Company. It has also been known as the South Dakota Dept. of Transportation Bridge No. 50-203-206. It was listed on the National Register of Historic Places in 1993.

Its NRHP nomination notes that it has a four-lane roadway and rests on piers that "are protected by pointed cutwaters with conical caps." The roadway is "flanked by sidewalks and concrete railings with neoclassically detailed balustrades. The railings mark the position of each pier with an elegant, fluted cast-iron light stand ornamented with consoles at the base."

Restoration work on the bridge was done in 1977.
