= Stoe Creek Bridge =

- U.S. National Register of Historic Places
- Location within Iowa Location within the United States
- Location: V Ave. over Stoe Creek
- Nearest city: Oelwein, Iowa
- Coordinates: 42°47′30.3″N 92°0′08.5″W
- Built: 1913-1914
- Built by: N.M. Stark and Company
- Architect: Iowa State Highway Commission
- Architectural style: Girder bridge
- MPS: Highway Bridges of Iowa MPS
- NRHP reference No.: 98000782
- Added to NRHP: June 25, 1998

Stoe Creek Bridge was a historic structure located northwest of Oelwein, Iowa, United States. It spanned Stoe Creek for 38 feet (12 m). In June and July 1913, the Fayette County Board of Supervisors awarded contracts for several small bridges in the county. The Iowa State Highway Commission designed this single span bridge that was built by N.M. Stark and Company of Des Moines. It was completed in 1914 for $1,654. The bridge was listed on the National Register of Historic Places in 1998. It was replaced in 2007.
