= Curtis Yelland House =

Historic house in Iowa, United States

- U.S. National Register of Historic Places
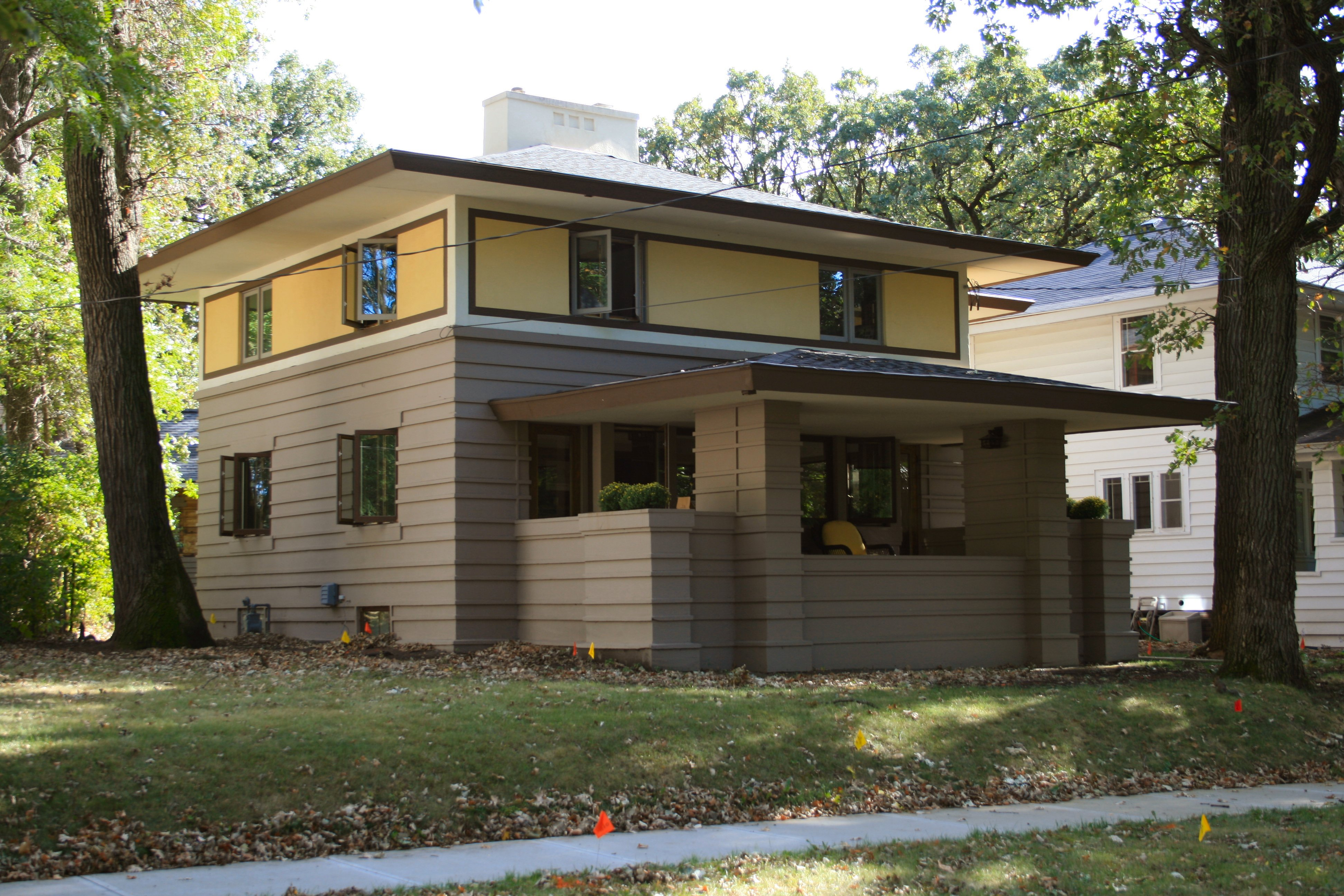

- Location within Iowa Location within the United States
- Location: 37 River Heights Dr. Mason City, Iowa
- Coordinates: 43°08′55.3″N 93°11′37.5″W
- Area: less than one acre
- Built: 1910
- Architect: William Drummond
- Architectural style: Prairie School
- MPS: Prairie School Architecture in Mason City TR
- NRHP reference No.: 80001443
- Added to NRHP: January 29, 1980

The Curtis Yelland House is a historic building located in Mason City, Iowa, United States. Frank Lloyd Wright associate William Eugene Drummond designed this Prairie School style house, completed in 1910. The house features a strong horizontal emphasis, broad hip roofs, board-and-batten siding, stucco on the upper-story, and a centrally located fireplace and chimney round which the open plan interior revolves. The main entry is on the side of the house. The only entry to the front porch is from the living room. It was listed on the National Register of Historic Places in 1980. The house suffered a serious fire in 2008, and was almost torn down. However, developer Jeff Tierney bought the property and restored the house in 2010.

== See also ==
- National Register of Historic Places listings in Cerro Gordo County, Iowa
