= Tremaine Bridge =

- U.S. National Register of Historic Places
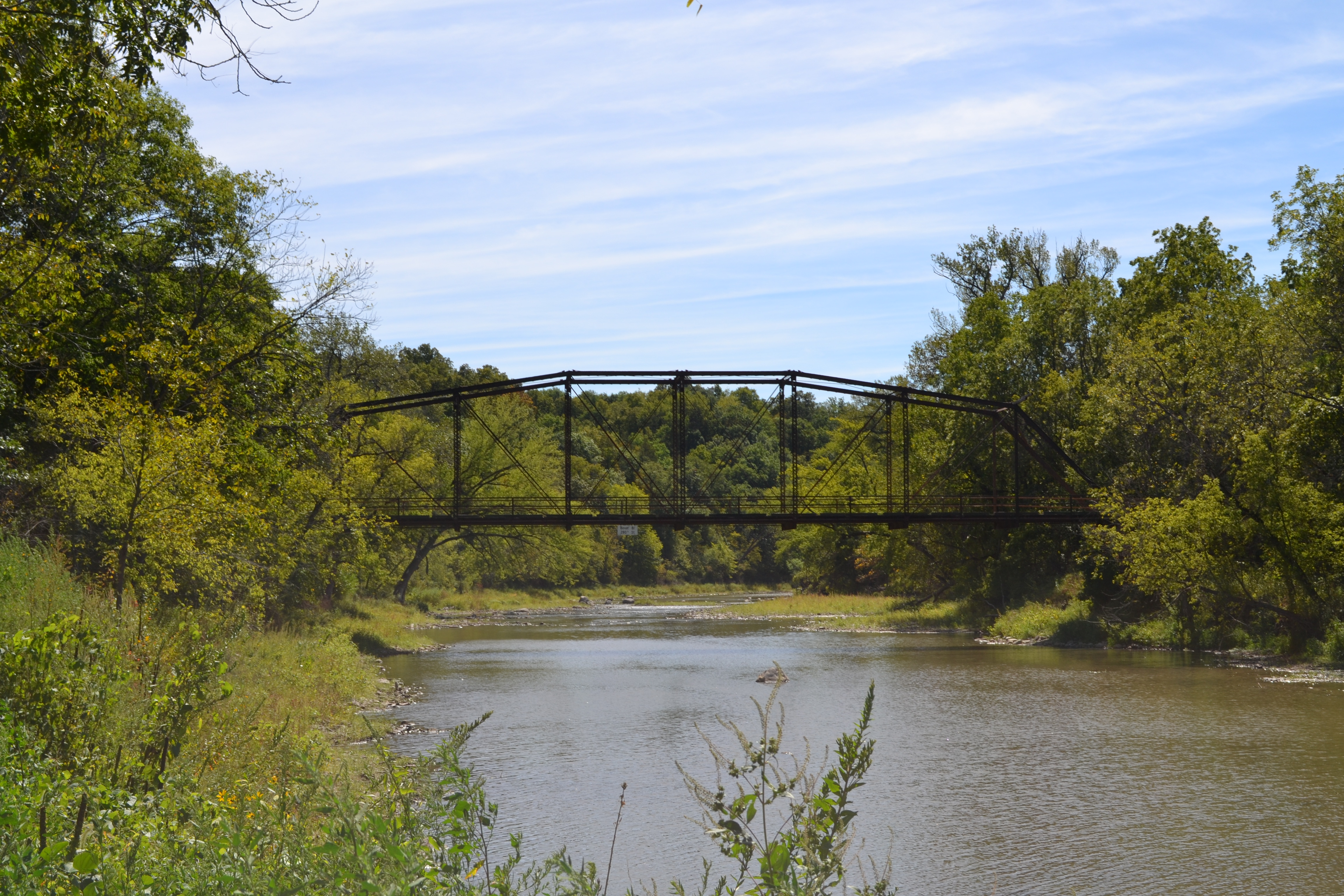

- Location within Iowa Location within the United States
- Location: 280th St. over the Boone River
- Nearest city: Webster City, Iowa
- Coordinates: 42°23′12″N 93°48′31″W
- Built: 1902
- Built by: N.M. Stark and Company
- Architect: N.M. Stark and Company
- Architectural style: Camelback through truss
- MPS: Highway Bridges of Iowa MPS
- NRHP reference No.: 98000519
- Added to NRHP: May 15, 1998

The Tremaine Bridge is a historic structure located south of Webster City, Iowa, United States. It spans the Boone River for 186 feet (57 m). In April 1902 the Hamilton County Board of Supervisors contracted with N.M. Stark and Company from Des Moines to design and build the new bridge in Independence Township for $3,600. The Carnegie Steel Company of Pittsburgh provided the steel. The Camelback through truss bridge was completed later in 1902. It was listed on the National Register of Historic Places in 1998.
