= Vine Street Bridge =

- U.S. National Register of Historic Places
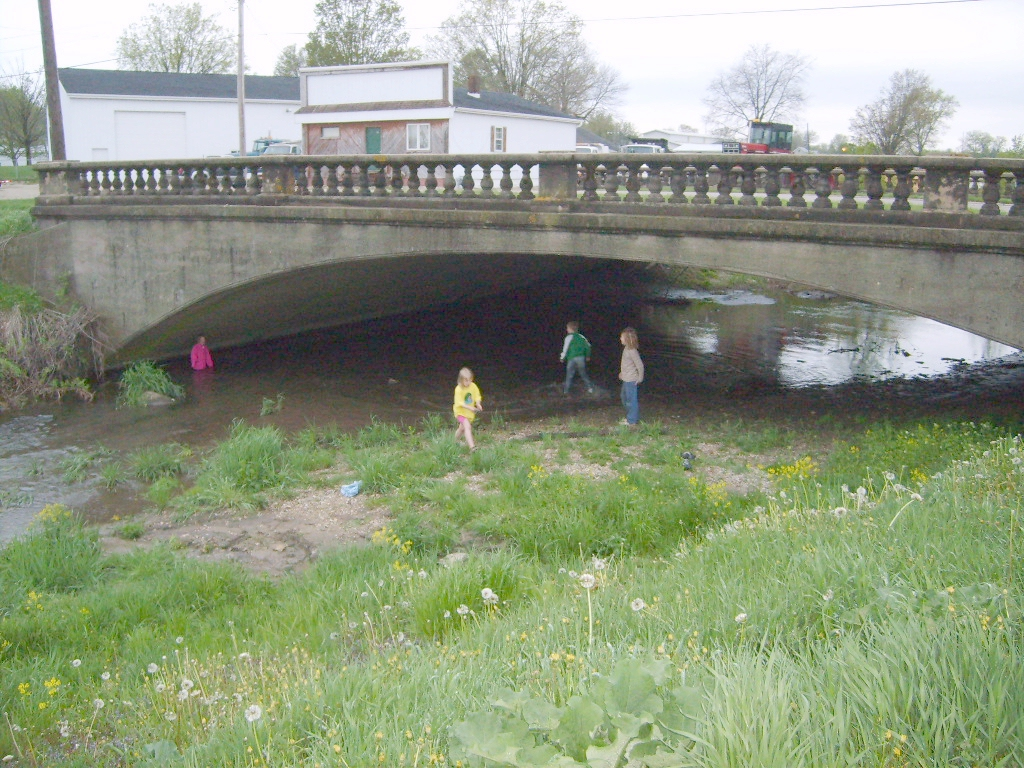

- Location within Iowa Location within the United States
- Location: South Vine St. over Otter Creek, West Union, Iowa
- Coordinates: 42°57′16.2″N 91°48′28.8″W
- Area: less than one acre
- Built: 1910
- Built by: N.M. Stark & Co.
- Architectural style: Concrete Luten arch
- MPS: Highway Bridges of Iowa MPS
- NRHP reference No.: 98000780
- Added to NRHP: June 25, 1998

The Vine Street Bridge in West Union, Iowa brings South Vine St. over Otter Creek. It is a concrete Luten arch bridge built in 1910 by N.M. Stark & Co. It was listed on the National Register of Historic Places in 1998.

It has a 66-foot (20 m) single span and a total length of 66 feet (20 m).

The NRHP nomination for the bridge asserts that "with its 66-foot span, the Vine Street Bridge is distinguished as one of the longest-span Luten arches remaining in Iowa."

== See also ==
- Minerva Creek Bridge
