= Winnebago River Bridge =

- U.S. National Register of Historic Places
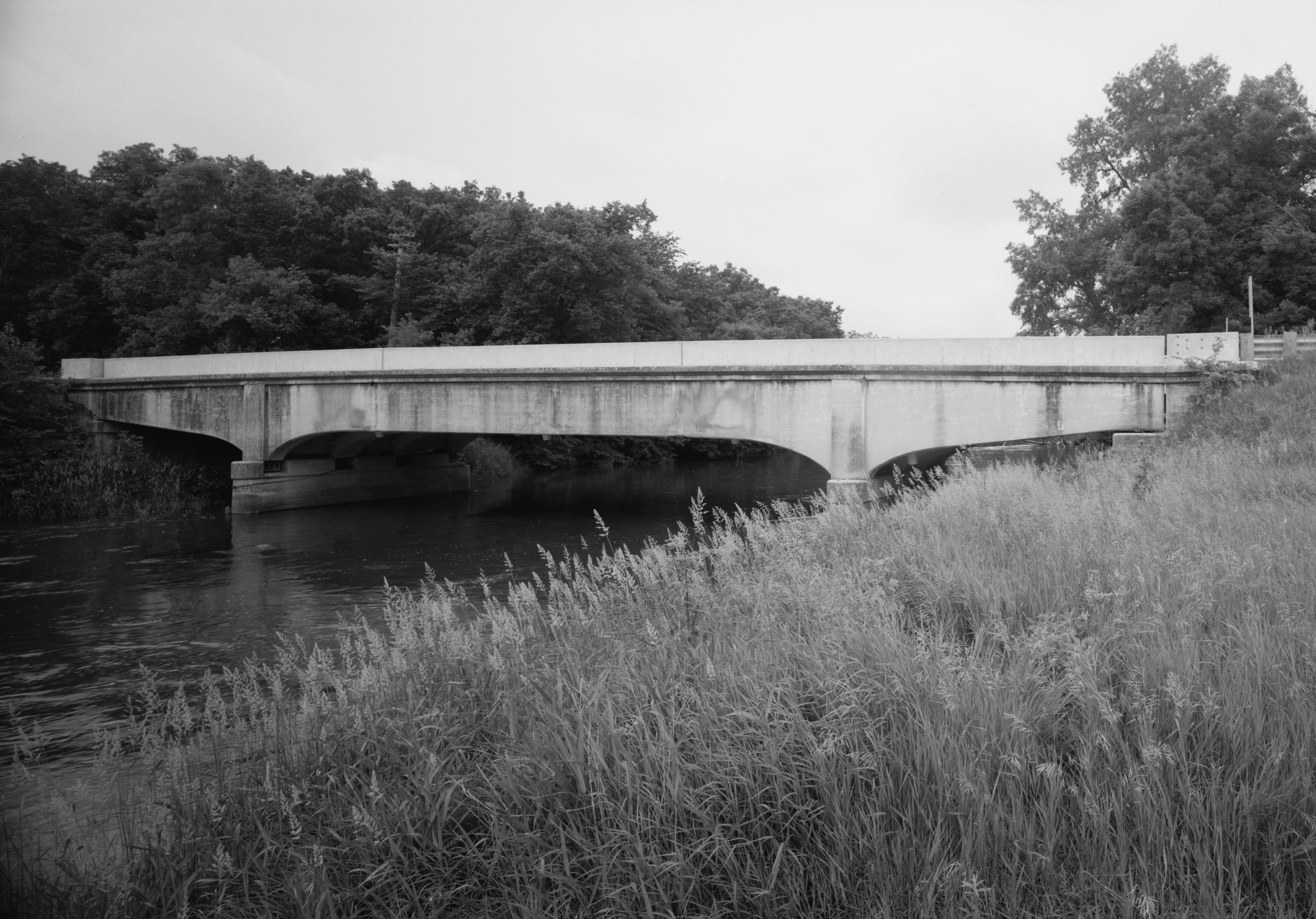

- Location within Iowa Location within the United States
- Location: US 65 over the Winnebago River
- Nearest city: Mason City, Iowa
- Coordinates: 43°11′35″N 93°12′36″W
- Area: less than one acre
- Built: 1926
- Built by: William Henkel; Concrete Engineering Co.
- Architect: Iowa State Highway Commission
- Architectural style: Cantilever deck girder
- MPS: Highway Bridges of Iowa MPS
- NRHP reference No.: 98000812
- Added to NRHP: June 25, 1998

The Winnebago River Bridge was a historic structure located north of Mason City, Iowa, United States. The span carried U.S. Route 65 over the Winnebago River for 122 feet (37 m). This is the second span at this location. The stone abutments from the previous bridge were utilized in this one. They were sheathed in concrete by the Concrete Engineering Company, and William Henkel of Mason City constructed the bridge. It is composed of three concrete spans with a 70 feet (21 m) center span cantilevered from shorter anchor spans. It was listed on the National Register of Historic Places in 1998. A second span has subsequently been built to the east in 1969.

The bridge was replaced in 2009.

== See also ==
- List of bridges documented by the Historic American Engineering Record in Iowa
- List of bridges on the National Register of Historic Places in Iowa
- National Register of Historic Places listings in Cerro Gordo County, Iowa
