= Calamus Creek Bridge =

- U.S. National Register of Historic Places
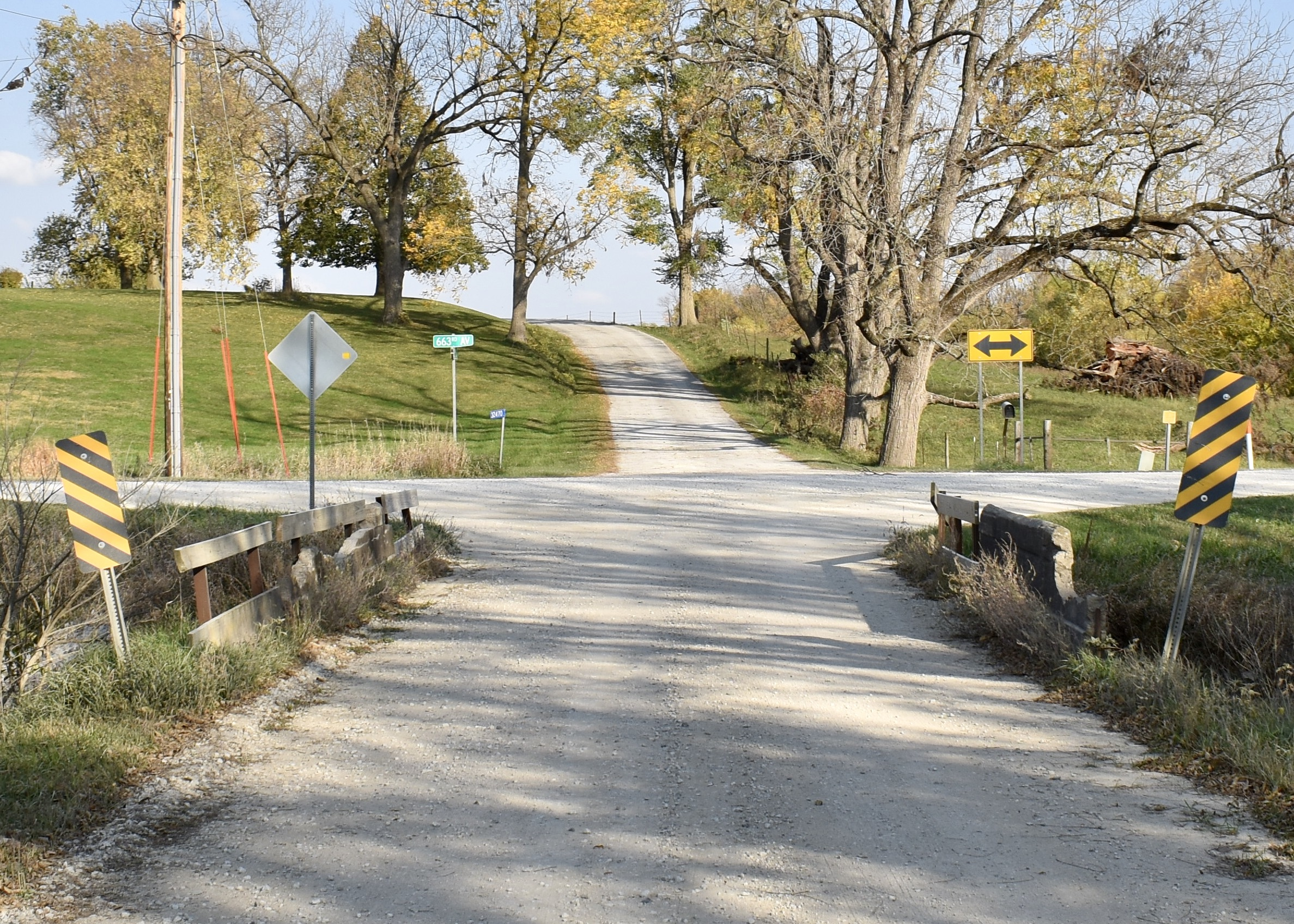

- Location within Iowa Location within the United States
- Nearest city: Maxwell, Iowa
- Coordinates: 41.88489°N 93.382°W
- Area: less than one acre
- Built: 1905
- Built by: N.M. Stark and Company
- Architectural style: Concrete Luten arch
- MPS: Highway Bridges of Iowa MPS
- NRHP reference No.: 98000486
- Added to NRHP: May 15, 1998

The Calamus Creek Bridge near Maxwell, Iowa is a concrete Luten arch bridge constructed in 1905. It was built by N. M. Stark and Company for a cost of $900. It has a 25-foot (7.6 m) single span and a total length of 45 feet (14 m).

In 1998 the Calamus Creek Bridge was listed on the National Register of Historic Places (NRHP), one of several N. M. Stark Luten bridges on the register.

The NRHP nomination for the bridge says:

Before the codification of bridge design in the state in 1913, Stark built perhaps hundreds of Luten arches throughout Iowa, in exclusive contracts with Story and other counties. This structure in Story County is distinguished as the earliest remaining Luten arch in the state. In fact, with its 1905 construction date, it is one of the oldest Luten arches in the country, built in the same year as Daniel Luten received his patent. For this reason, it is a technologically significant, transportation-related resource.
