= N. M. Stark and Company =

N. M. Stark and Company, of Des Moines, Iowa, was a firm active in building bridges in Iowa.

== History ==
Nathaniel McClure Stark (1863–1935) was born in Indianola, Iowa, and received an engineering degree from Iowa State Agricultural College (now Iowa State University). In 1888, he entered the bridge building industry as an agent for the King Iron Bridge and Manufacturing Company of Cleveland. He founded the N. M. Stark Company in 1894.

N. M. Stark had an effective monopoly on bridge construction in Marshall County, Iowa, from 1908 until a state law in 1913 stopped the practice.

A number of the firm's works are listed on the U.S. National Register of Historic Places.

== Notable projects ==
- Tremaine Bridge (1902), 280th Street over the Boone River, Webster City, Iowa, NRHP-listed
- State Street Bridge (1903), East State Street over Willow Creek, Mason City, Iowa, NRHP-listed
- Calamus Creek Bridge (1905), aka 325th Street Bridge, 325th Street over Calamus Creek, Maxwell, Iowa, NRHP-listed
- Squaw Creek Bridge (1908), over Squaw Creek in Ames, Iowa
- Honey Creek Bridge (1910), over Honey Creek at 105th Street, near Bangor, Iowa
- Minerva Creek Bridge (1910), County Road S52 over Minerva Creek, Clemons, Iowa, NRHP-listed
- Vine Street Bridge (1910), South Vine Street over Otter Creek, West Union, Iowa, NRHP-listed
- East Indian Creek Bridge (1912), 260th Street over East Indian Creek, Nevada, Iowa, NRHP-listed
- Eighth Street Bridge (1912), South Eighth Street over the Big Sioux River, Sioux Falls, South Dakota, NRHP-listed
- Stewart Avenue Bridge (1914), North Carolina Avenue over the Winnebago River, Mason City, Iowa, NRHP-listed
- Stoe Creek Bridge (1914), V Avenue over Stoe Creek, Oelwein, Iowa, NRHP-listed
- Twin Bridge (1916), 130th Street over the Little Volga River, Fayette, Iowa, NRHP-listed
- Rainbow Arch Bridge, aka South Third Avenue Bridge, over Linn Creek on South Third Avenue, Marshalltown, Iowa
