= Keerl–Decker House =

Historic house in Iowa, United States

- U.S. National Register of Historic Places
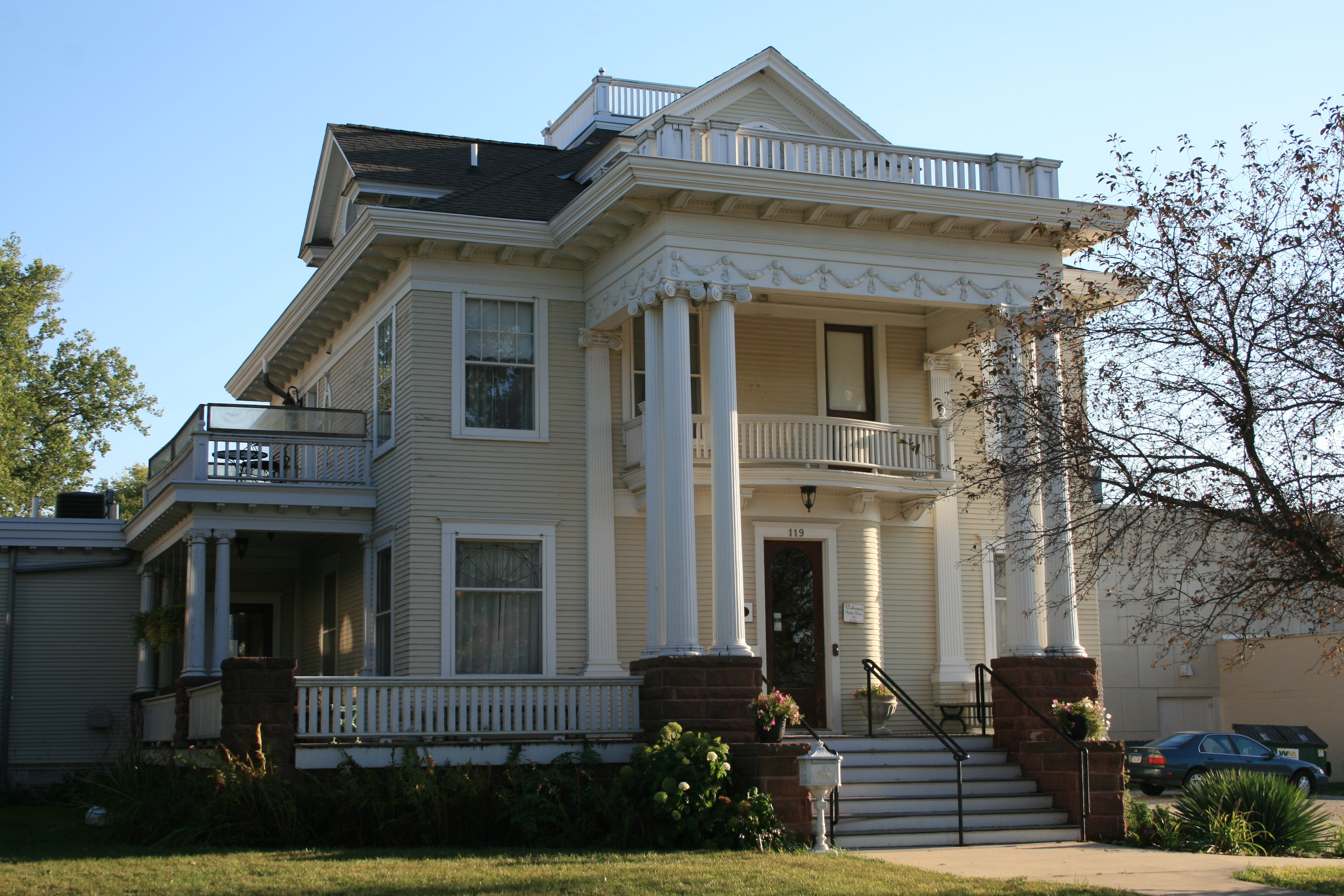

- Location within Iowa Location within the United States
- Location: 119 2nd St., SE; Mason City, Iowa
- Coordinates: 43°08′58.9″N 93°11′54.8″W
- Area: less than one acre
- Built: 1902
- Built by: E.R. Bogardus
- Architectural style: Classical Revival
- NRHP reference No.: 02001537
- Added to NRHP: December 20, 2002

The Keerl–Decker House is a historic building located in Mason City, Iowa, United States. It was designed by local architect E.R. Bogardus, and completed in 1902. The two-story frame structure features a full height front porch with Ionic columns. There is also a similar single-story side porch. The house is capped with a hip roof with dormers, and a denticulated cornice with modillions. It was built for Irving Keerl, who served as Clerk of Courts for Cerro Gordo County, and he was one of the organizers of the Iowa State Bank of Mason City. The house is also associated with the Decker family who owned it from 1919 to 1965. They operated the Decker Meat Packing Plant, which is now operated by ConAgra Foods. The house was converted into a restaurant in the 1970s. It was at that time that an addition to house a commercial kitchen was built. The house has subsequently been converted into a bed and breakfast. It was listed on the National Register of Historic Places in 2002.
