= Rogers-Knutson House =

Historic house in Iowa, United States

- U.S. National Register of Historic Places
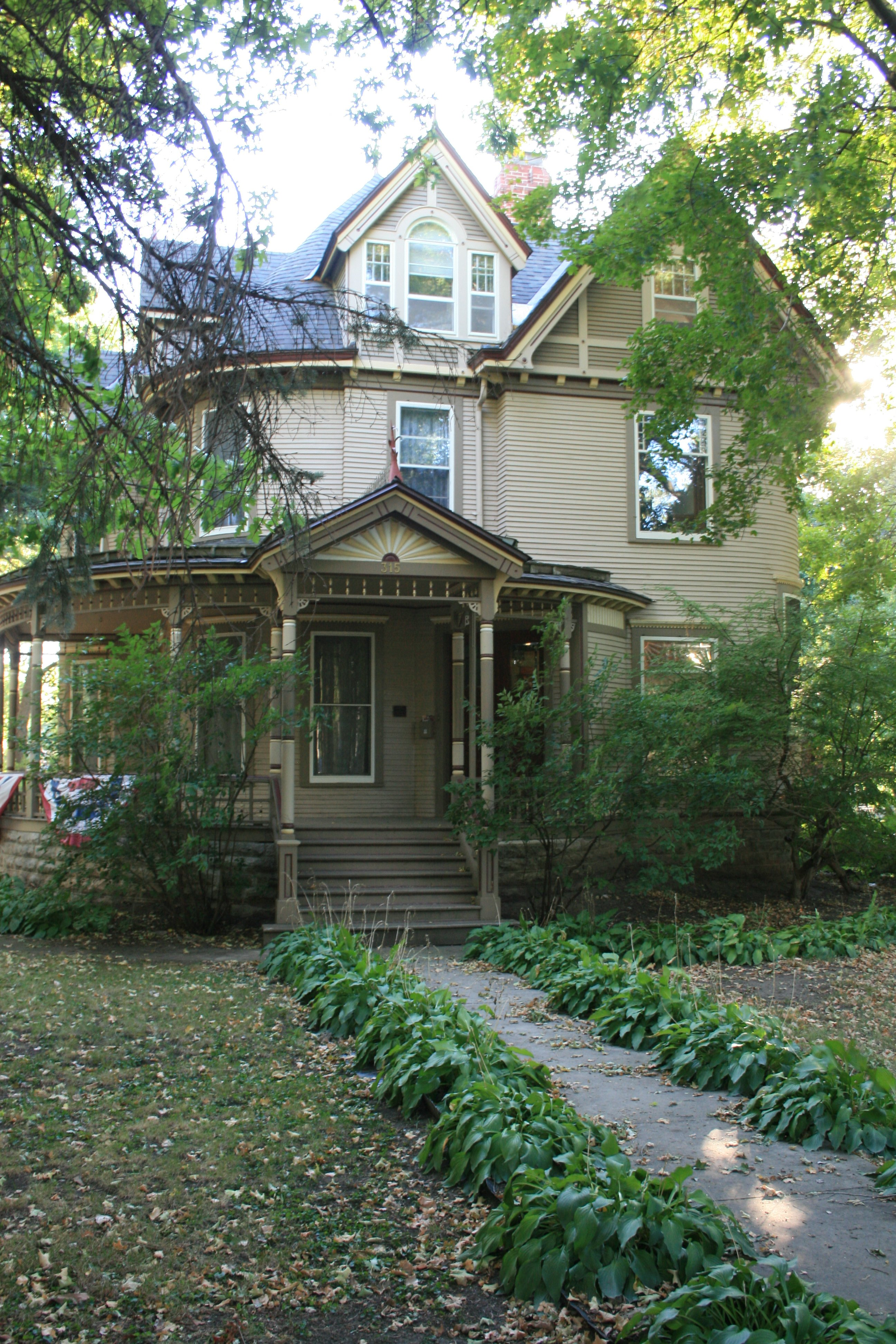

- Location within Iowa Location within the United States
- Location: 315 N. 3rd St. Clear Lake, Iowa
- Coordinates: 43°08′18.7″N 93°23′07.2″W
- Area: less than one acre
- Built: 1895
- Architectural style: Late Victorian
- NRHP reference No.: 82002612
- Added to NRHP: September 9, 1982

The Rogers-Knutson House is a historic building located in Clear Lake, Iowa, United States. Built in 1895, the Queen Anne Victorian house was built for Francis M. Rogers. He was a farmer, served in the Civil War, was the clerk of court and ran a clothing store in Mason City before he bought the private First National Bank in Clear Lake in 1889. He went on to serve on the board of education, city council, and as mayor of Clear Lake. Clarence and Hazel Knutson bought the house in 1920. Clarence was also a banker and served as mayor. Knutson worked in the family hardware store, served in the Iowa Legislature, and served as the president of the Iowa Hardware Mutual Insurance Company from 1931 to 1960. Hazel Knutson was involved with a variety of civic clubs and organizations, including conservation efforts. She also served as president of the Iowa League of Women Voters. Howard and Francie Sonksen bought the house in 1972. Howard was a teacher and Francie worked from home as a massage therapist. They brought the home back to its original glory, such as removing the wall-to-wall carpeting, refinishing the beautiful wood floors, restoring the solarium and the outside pond pumps back to working order.

The house features a variety of Late Victorian architectural elements. It follows an irregular plan that includes Eastlake incised bargeboards and porch fretwork, and Queen Anne leaded, etched and colored windows and decorative stickwork on some of the gable ends. The house has an exuberant roofline that features a jumble of gables, gabled dormers, and jerkinhead dormers. It was listed on the National Register of Historic Places in 1982.
