= Chris Rye House =

Historic house in Iowa, United States

- U.S. National Register of Historic Places
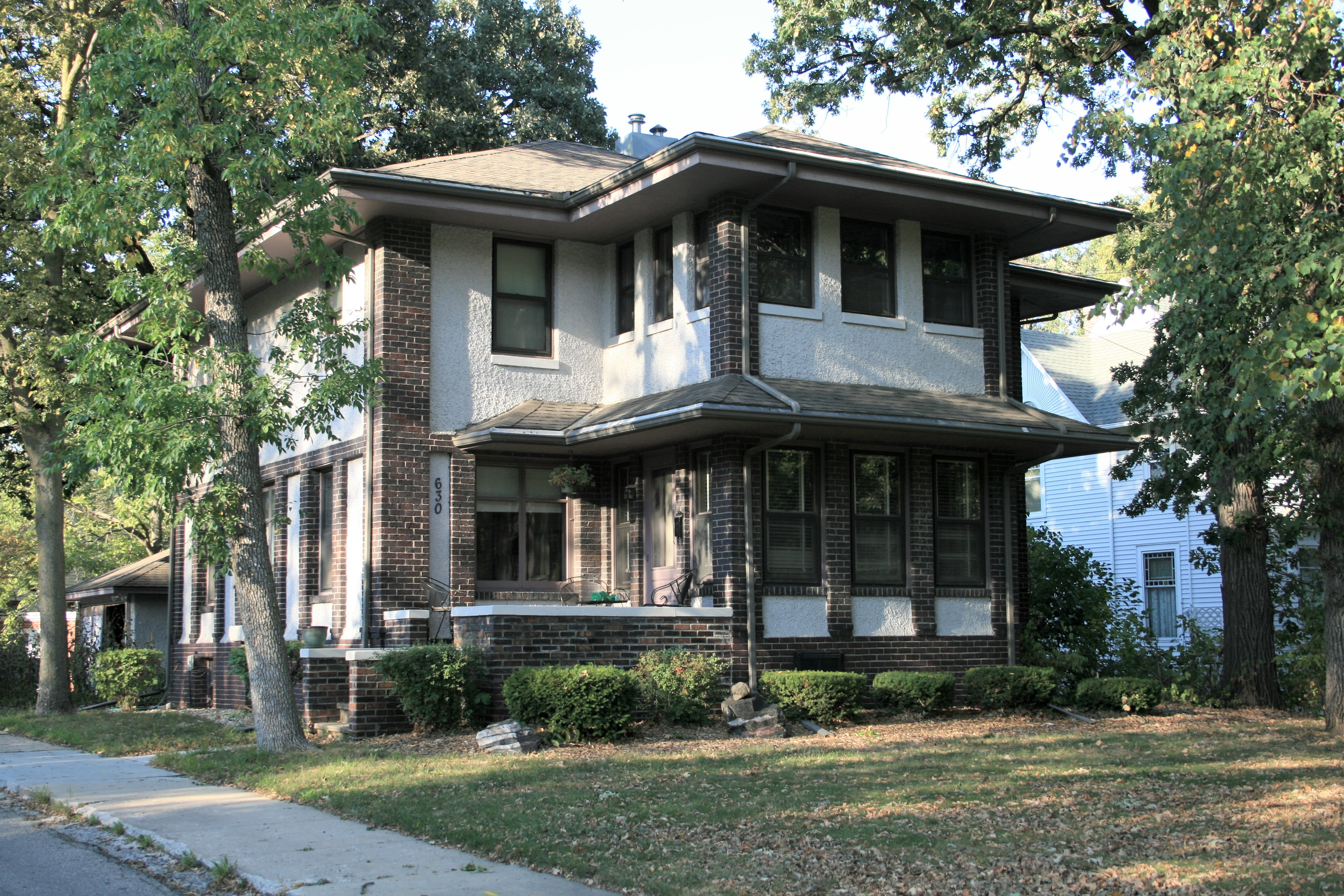

- Location within Iowa Location within the United States
- Location: 630 E. State St. Mason City, Iowa
- Coordinates: 43°09′04.2″N 93°11′36.4″W
- Area: less than one acre
- Built: 1912
- Built by: Chris Rye
- Architectural style: Prairie School
- MPS: Prairie School Architecture in Mason City TR
- NRHP reference No.: 80001438
- Added to NRHP: January 29, 1980

The Chris Rye House is a historic building located in Mason City, Iowa, United States. Rye was a local contractor who built this Prairie School influenced house for his family. He may have designed it as well. Rye was responsible for constructing many of Walter Burley Griffin's houses in the Rock Crest – Rock Glen development, as well as other buildings in north-central Iowa. The exterior of the two-story house is a unique combination of brick and stucco, and it's capped with a hip roof. It was listed on the National Register of Historic Places in 1980.
