= Amaziah and Cornelia (Wait) Cannon House =

Historic house in Iowa, United States

- U.S. National Register of Historic Places
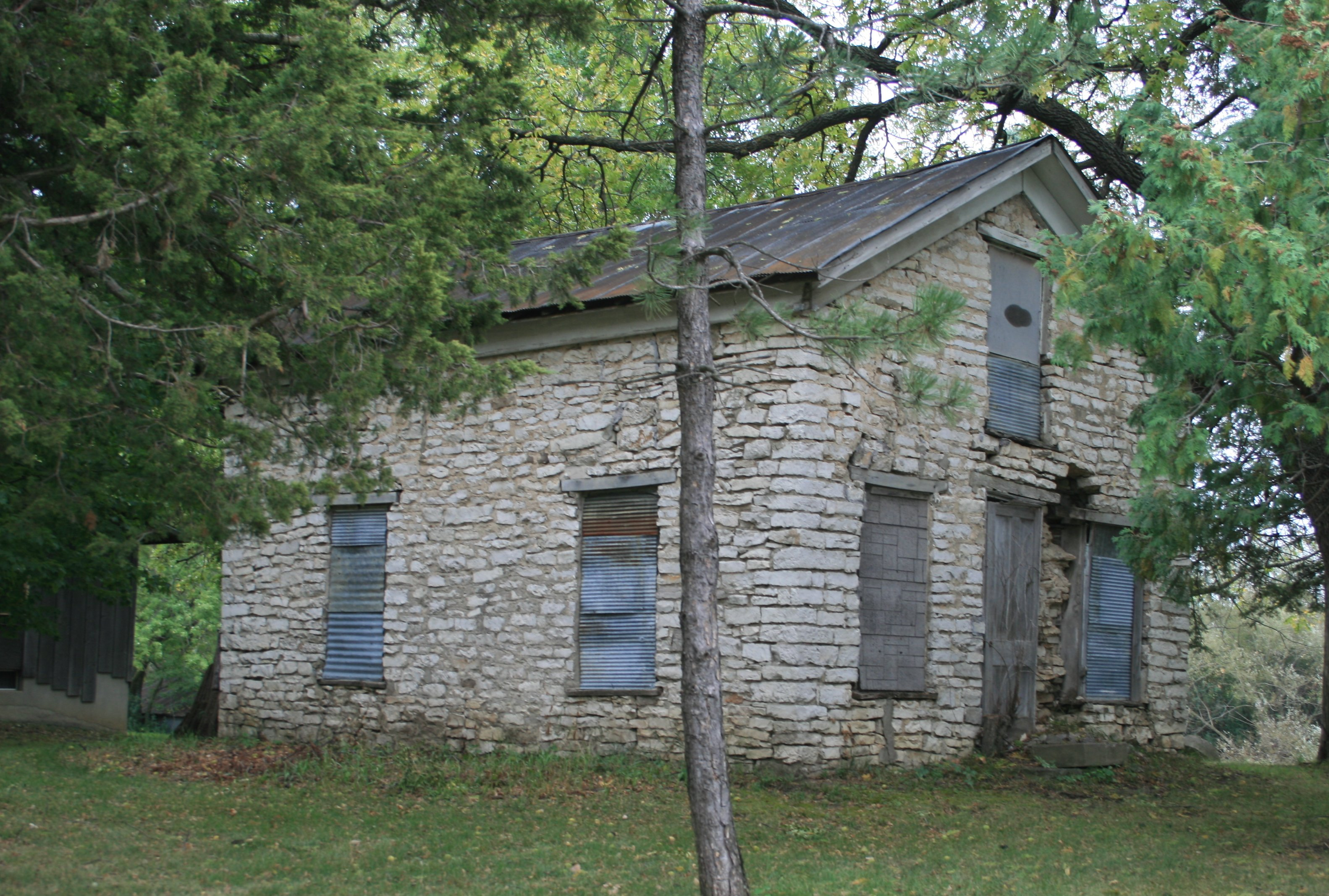

- Location within Iowa Location within the United States
- Location: 1581 N. Eisenhower Ave., Mason City, Iowa
- Coordinates: 43°10′01.6″N 93°15′37″W
- Area: less than one acre
- Built: 1866
- Architectural style: Mid 19th Century Revival
- NRHP reference No.: 04000899
- Added to NRHP: August 25, 2004

The Amaziah and Cornelia (Wait) Cannon House, also known as Crab Apple Grove, is a historic building located in Mason City, Iowa, United States. New York natives Amaziah and Cornelia Cannon settled here from Wisconsin in 1866 with their three children. They built this 1½-story stone house the same year in a grove of crab apple trees. It is one of three stone houses built during the settlement era remaining in Mason City. It was occupied by the Cannons and their descendants until 1963, when the present house on the farmstead was built immediately to the east. This house is currently unoccupied and in a deteriorating condition. It has been used as a workshop intermittently. At the time of its construction it was 3 miles (4.8 km) northwest of town, but the farmstead was incorporated into the city limits in the 1970s. The immediate area has remained rural, however. The house was listed on the National Register of Historic Places in 2004.
