= St. John Baptist Church (Mason City, Iowa) =

- U.S. National Register of Historic Places
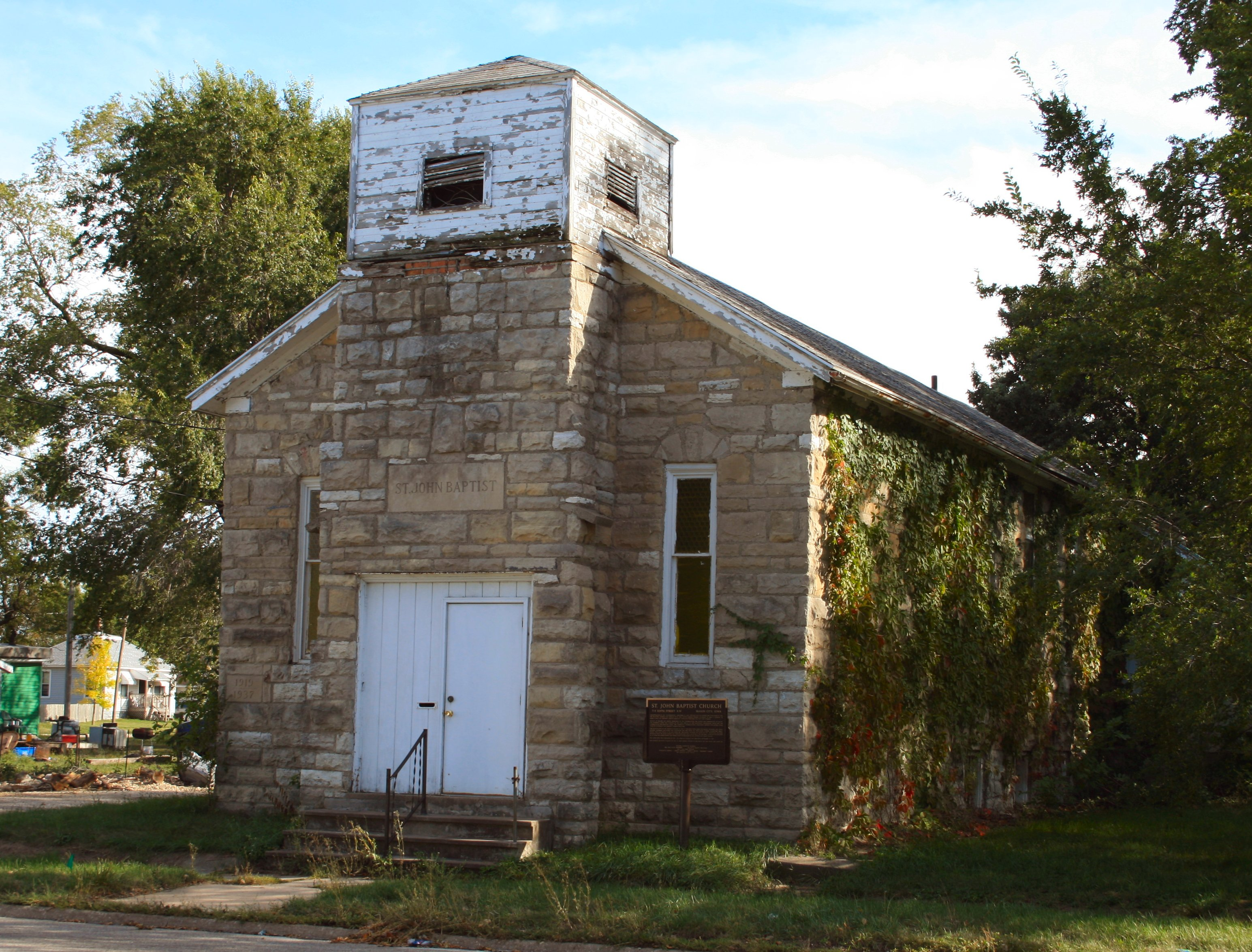

- Location within Iowa Location within the United States
- Location: 715 6th St. SW; Mason City, Iowa
- Coordinates: 43°08′46.2″N 93°12′44.7″W
- Area: less than one acre
- Built: 1937
- Architect: Spencer Brothers
- Architectural style: Ecclesiastical, vernacular
- NRHP reference No.: 01001484
- Added to NRHP: January 24, 2002

St. John Baptist Church is an African American Baptist congregation that started in 1919 and is the name of its historic church building at 715 6th Street SW in Mason City, Iowa that was built in 1937.

The building is a 24 feet (7.3 m) by 56 feet (17 m) rectangular church with a 4 feet (1.2 m) vestibule, built on a high 5.5 feet (1.7 m) stone foundation. According to its NRHP nomination, "St. John Baptist is an example of simple vernacular design, based on the centuries-old rectangular nave floor plan. No architect has been identified, although some believe that Spencer Brothers, a local African-American construction firm, may have drawn the plans." It was built by members of the congregation, using stones salvaged from a demolished local elementary school.

It was added to the National Register in 2002. It was deemed significant " for its association with a strong African-American community, and the role the church played in an ethnically diverse neighborhood."
