= State Street Bridge (Mason City, Iowa) =

- U.S. National Register of Historic Places
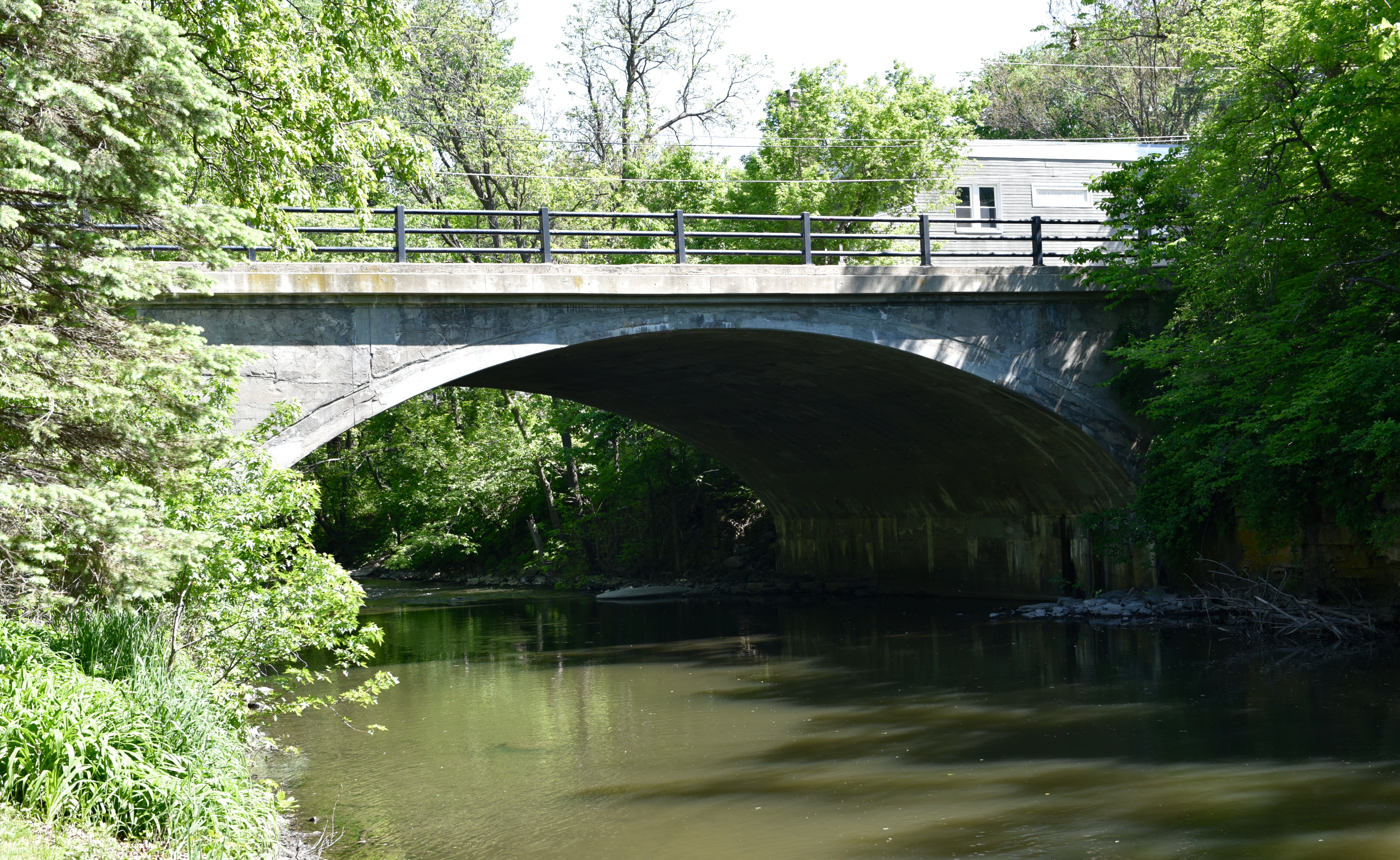

- Location within Iowa Location within the United States
- Location: East State Street over Willow Creek, Mason City, Iowa
- Coordinates: 43°09′06.6″N 93°11′30.2″W
- Area: less than one acre
- Built: 1903
- Built by: N.M. Stark and Company
- Architectural style: Spandrel arch
- MPS: Highway Bridges of Iowa MPS
- NRHP reference No.: 98000740
- Added to NRHP: June 25, 1998

The State Street Bridge is a historic structure located in Mason City, Iowa, United States. The span carries East State Street over Willow Creek for 62 feet (19 m). In the mid- to late-19th century, State Street was the only road into town from the east. There was a bridge at this crossing from at least 1875, but it is unknown what kind of bridges or how many served the crossing. This bridge was completed in 1903 and features a barrel arch with filled spandrels. Although the original guardrails have been replaced, it is the oldest roadway arch bridge in Cerro Gordo County. It was listed on the National Register of Historic Places in 1998.

== See also ==
- List of bridges on the National Register of Historic Places in Iowa
- National Register of Historic Places listings in Cerro Gordo County, Iowa
