= C.F. Franke House =

Historic house in Iowa, United States

- U.S. National Register of Historic Places
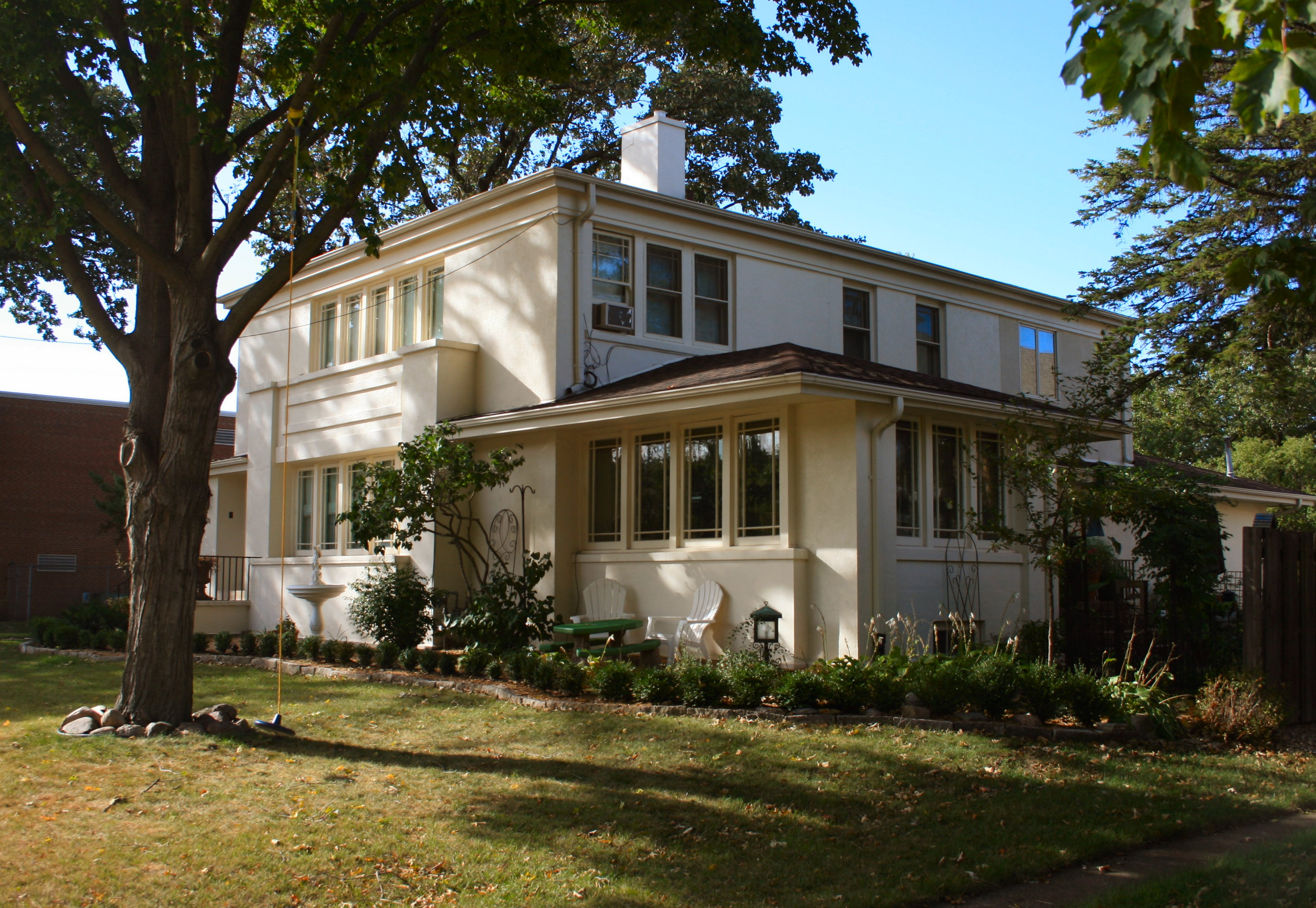

- Location within Iowa Location within the United States
- Location: 320 1st St., SE. Mason City, Iowa
- Coordinates: 43°09′4.2″N 93°11′42.8″W
- Area: less than one acre
- Built: 1916
- Architectural style: Prairie School
- MPS: Prairie School Architecture in Mason City TR
- NRHP reference No.: 80001432
- Added to NRHP: January 29, 1980

The C.F. Franke House is a historic building located in Mason City, Iowa, United States. Built in 1916, the exterior of the two-story structure is covered with stucco. It utilizes the Mason City variant of the Prairie School style to stucco over corbelled masonry to form the wall panels for visual effect. Although the eaves on the second story were cut back almost flush with the walls, the house maintains its horizontal emphasis, including the grouping of the casement windows. It was listed on the National Register of Historic Places in 1980.
