= Forest Park Historic District =

Historic district in Iowa, United States

- U.S. National Register of Historic Places
- U.S. Historic district
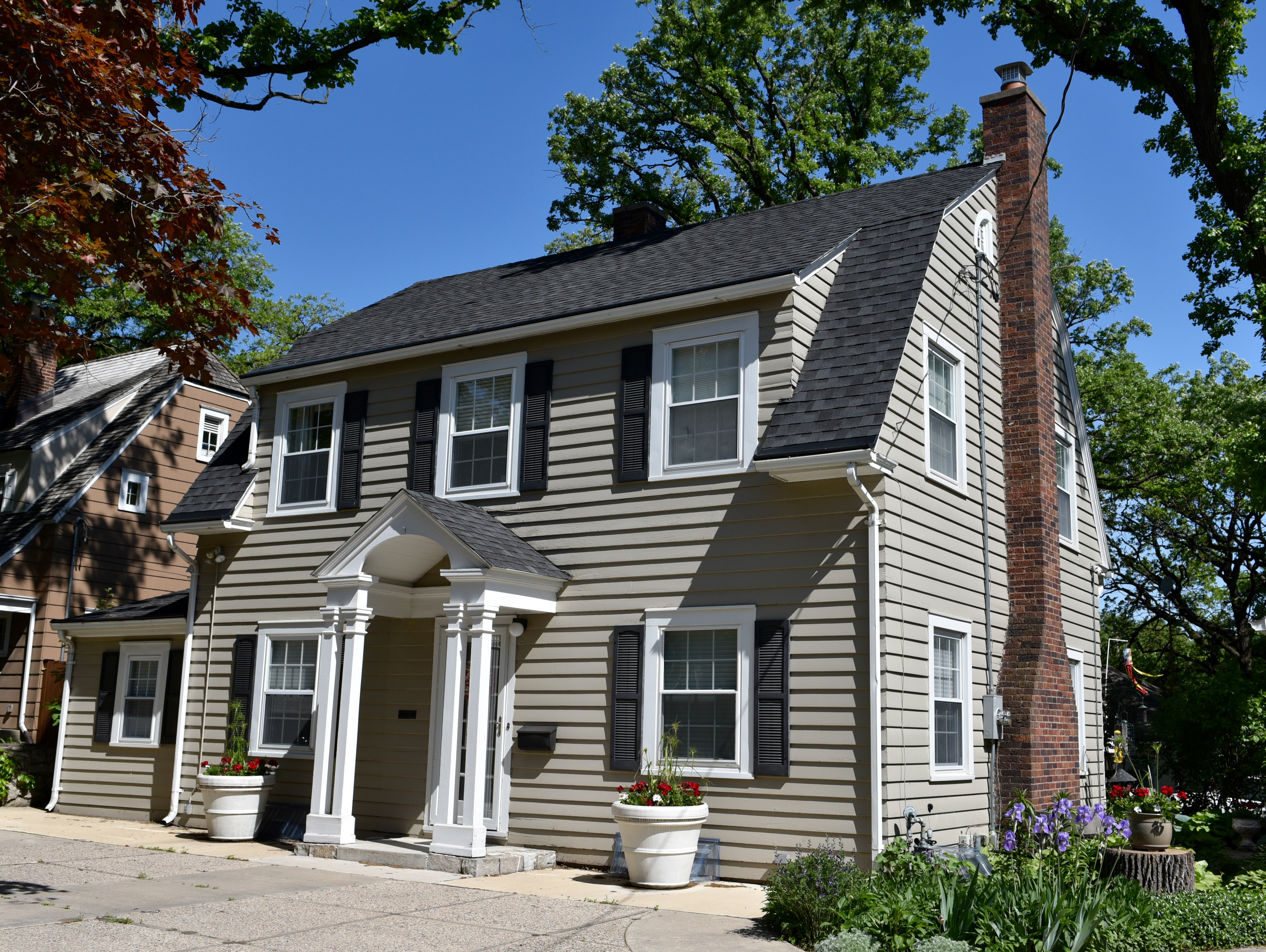
- Simon Fox House (1935)

- Location within Iowa Location within the United States
- Location: Roughly bounded by Willow Cr., Crescent & Linden Drs., State St., S. Pierce & N. Taylor Aves., 1st St. SW., Mason City, Iowa
- Coordinates: 43°09′14″N 93°13′02″W
- Area: 55 acres (22 ha)
- Architectural style: Late 19th & early 20th century American movements Late 19th & early 20th century Revivals; Modern movement
- NRHP reference No.: 14001167
- Added to NRHP: January 20, 2015

The Forest Park Historic District is a nationally recognized historic district located in Mason City, Iowa, United States. It was listed on the National Register of Historic Places in 2015. At the time of its nomination it contained 403 resources, which included 291 contributing buildings, of which 201 are houses and 90 are garages, and 112 non-contributing buildings. The historic district is a residential area located to the west of the central business district. It was platted between 1912 and 1916. Initial development in the 1910s was slow, but from the 1920s into the early 1940s, development was steady. It dropped off again after World War II as most of the lots had been developed by then. The houses range in height from one to 2½-stories. Those on Crescent, Linden, and Beaumont are larger in scale, while the rest are more modest in size. The foundations are generally brick or tile and the exteriors are clad in wood, with a few clad in brick. Architectural styles that were popular from early to mid-20th century are represented. The most popular include Prairie School, American Craftsman, Tudor Revival, Colonial Revival, and Modern. For the most part, the house designs came from a pattern book or catalogue. The streets on the west side of the district follow a grid pattern, while those on the east side are curvilinear. The neighborhood has a large tree canopy with trees planted in yards and in the boulevards along the streets.

Of the non-contributing buildings, 33 are houses and 79 are detached garages. The Tessa Youngblood House (1922) is individually listed on the National Register of Historic Places.
