= George Romey House =

Historic house in Iowa, United States

- U.S. National Register of Historic Places
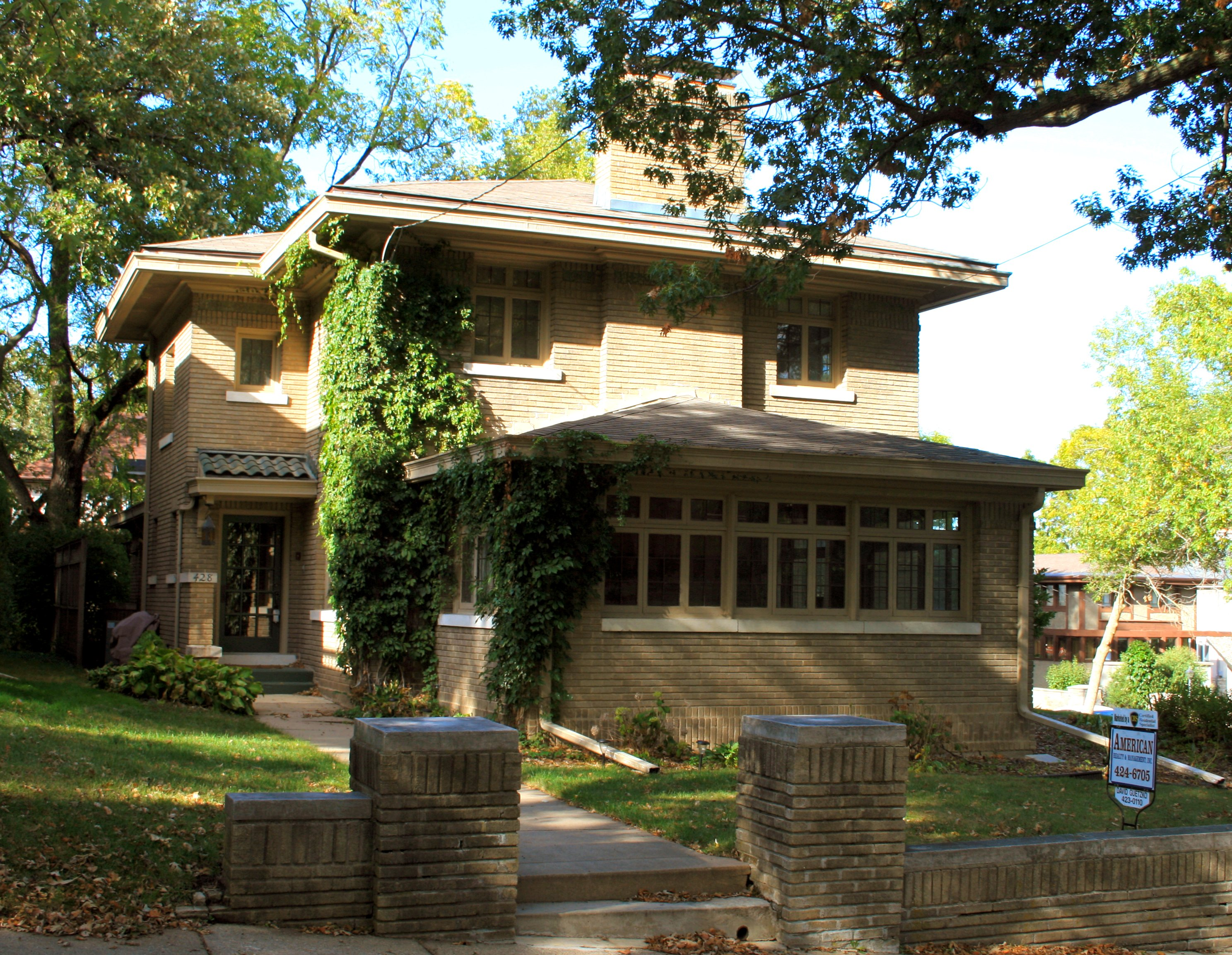

- Location within Iowa Location within the United States
- Location: 108 4th St., NE. Mason City, Iowa
- Coordinates: 43°09′04.2″N 93°11′36.4″W
- Area: less than one acre
- Built: 1920
- Architect: Fred Lipper
- Architectural style: Prairie School
- MPS: Prairie School Architecture in Mason City TR
- NRHP reference No.: 80001437
- Added to NRHP: January 29, 1980

The George Romey House, also known as the Bruce Girton House, is a historic building located in Mason City, Iowa, United States. George A. Romey was a local realtor who worked in partnership with William L. Patton. He had Fred Lippert design this Prairie School house, which was built by J.M. Felt & Company in 1920. Bruce Girton, the later owner, operated the family feed business. The two-story brick house features wide eaves, broad hip roof, and groups of casement windows. It was listed on the National Register of Historic Places in 1980.
