= A.J. Andrus Duplex =

Historic house in Iowa, United States

- U.S. National Register of Historic Places
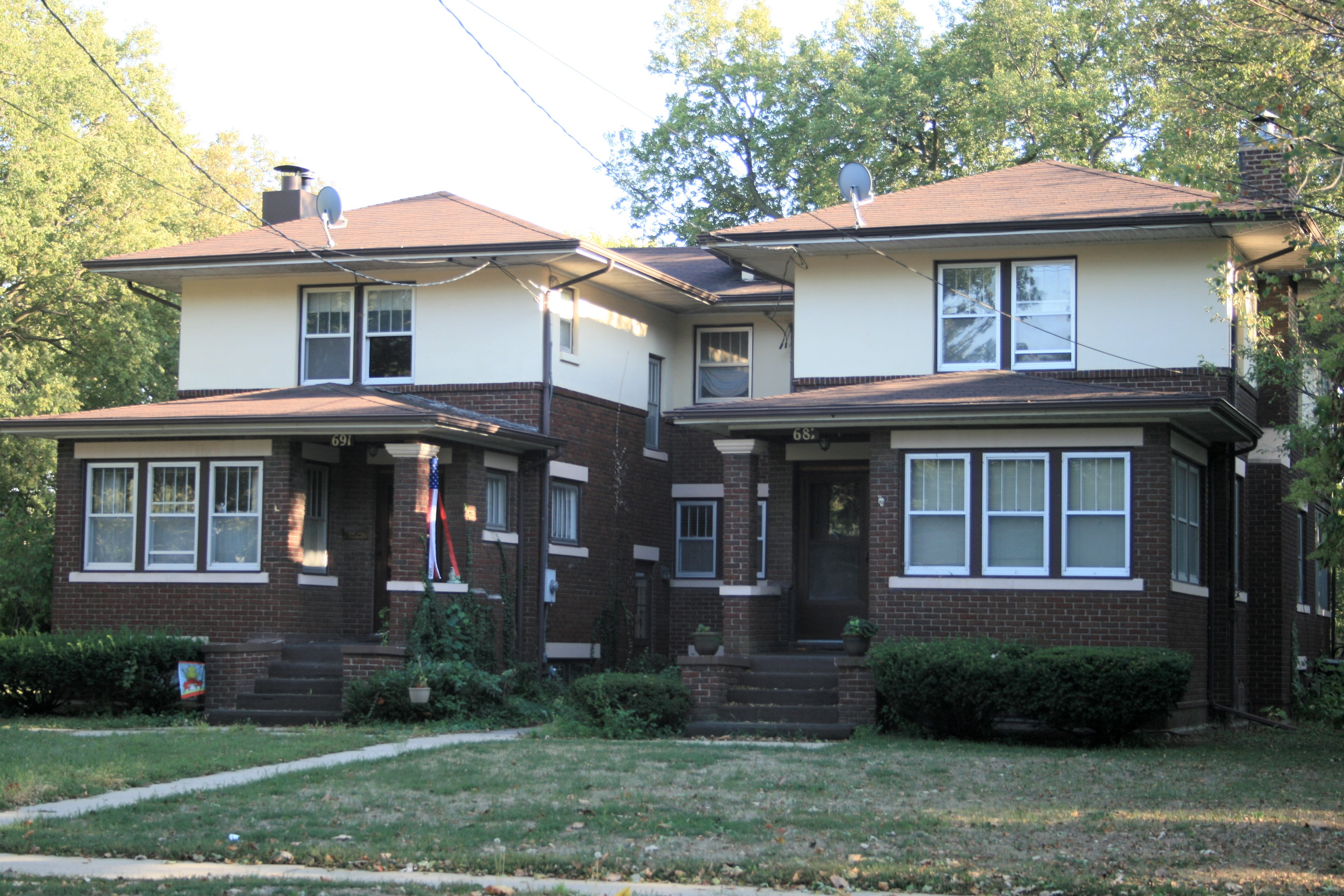

- Location within Iowa Location within the United States
- Location: 687-691 E. State St. Mason City, Iowa
- Coordinates: 43°09′5.4″N 93°11′14.2″W
- Area: less than one acre
- Built: 1921
- Architectural style: Prairie School
- MPS: Prairie School Architecture in Mason City TR
- NRHP reference No.: 80001431
- Added to NRHP: January 29, 1980

The A.J. Andrus Duplex, also known as the Paul Pritchard Duplex, is a historic building located in Mason City, Iowa, United States. The two-story structure was completed in 1921 in the Prairie School style. Its most distinguishing feature is its C-shaped plan. The exterior is composed of brick on the first floor and stucco on the second floor. The duplex has a horizontal emphasis about it with a broad, overhanging hipped roof, and bands of windows. It was listed on the National Register of Historic Places in 1980.
