= Stewart Avenue Bridge =

- U.S. National Register of Historic Places
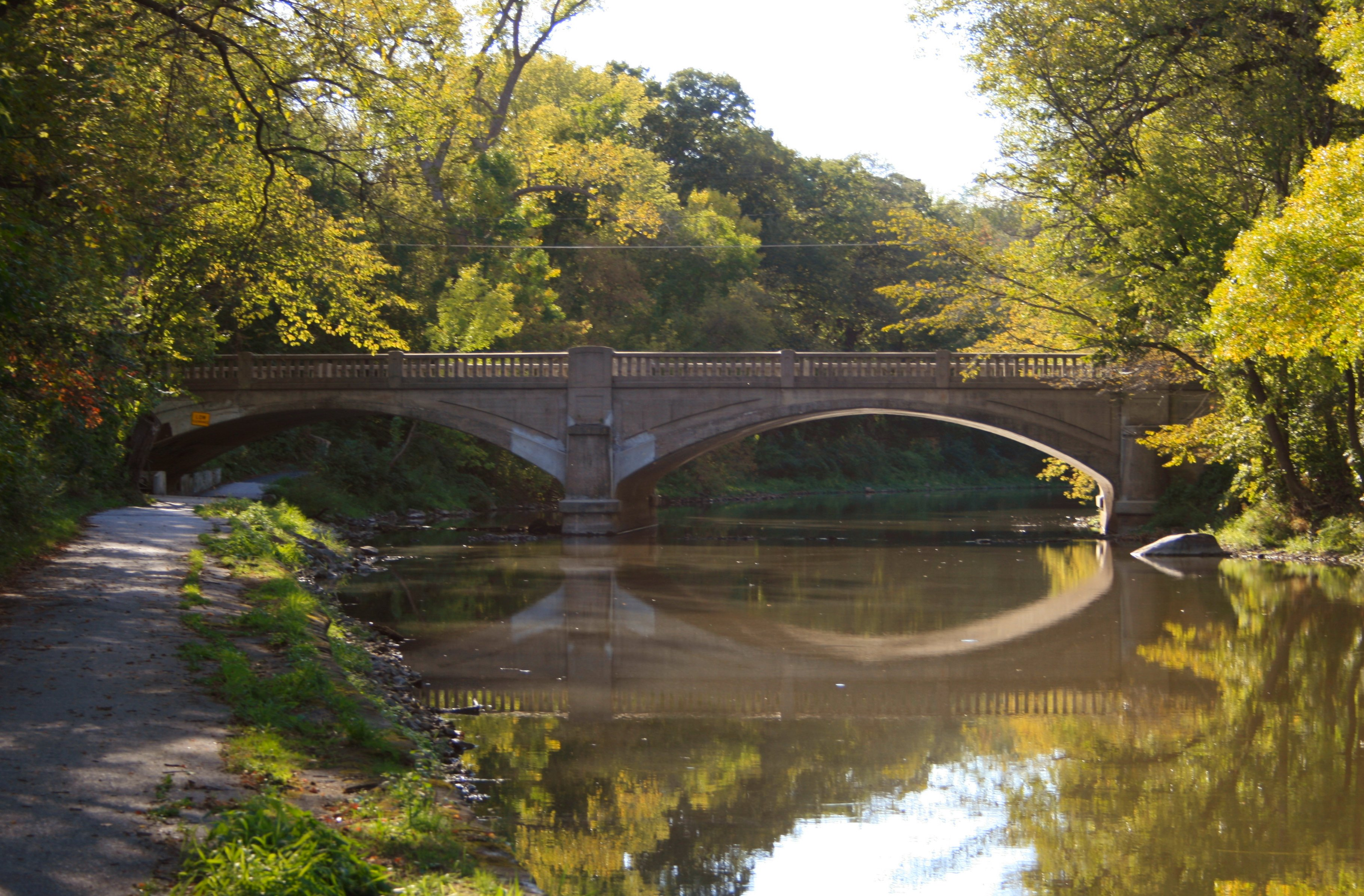

- Location within Iowa Location within the United States
- Location: North Carolina Avenue over the Winnebago River, Mason City, Iowa
- Coordinates: 43°09′23.5″N 93°11′24.5″W
- Area: less than one acre
- Built: 1914
- Built by: N.M. Stark and Company
- Architect: Iowa State Highway Commission
- Architectural style: Spandrel arch
- MPS: Highway Bridges of Iowa MPS
- NRHP reference No.: 98000741
- Added to NRHP: June 25, 1998

The Stewart Avenue Bridge is a historic bridge located in Mason City, in the north-central part of the U.S. state of Iowa. It carries North Carolina Avenue over the Winnebago River for a distance of 116 feet (35 m).

== History ==
This span replaced bowstring arch-truss bridge at this residential location. The Iowa State Highway Commission had the plans completed by November 1913, although the city did not petition the county to have it built until February 1914. N.M. Stark and Company of Des Moines had the low bid at $12,775, which included the removal of the old bridge. Charles Smith provided the fill for the bridge, which opened in August 1914.

The bridge was listed on the National Register of Historic Places in 1998.

== See also ==
- List of bridges on the National Register of Historic Places in Iowa
- National Register of Historic Places listings in Cerro Gordo County, Iowa
