= Hotel Lester-Lester Cafe =

- U.S. National Register of Historic Places
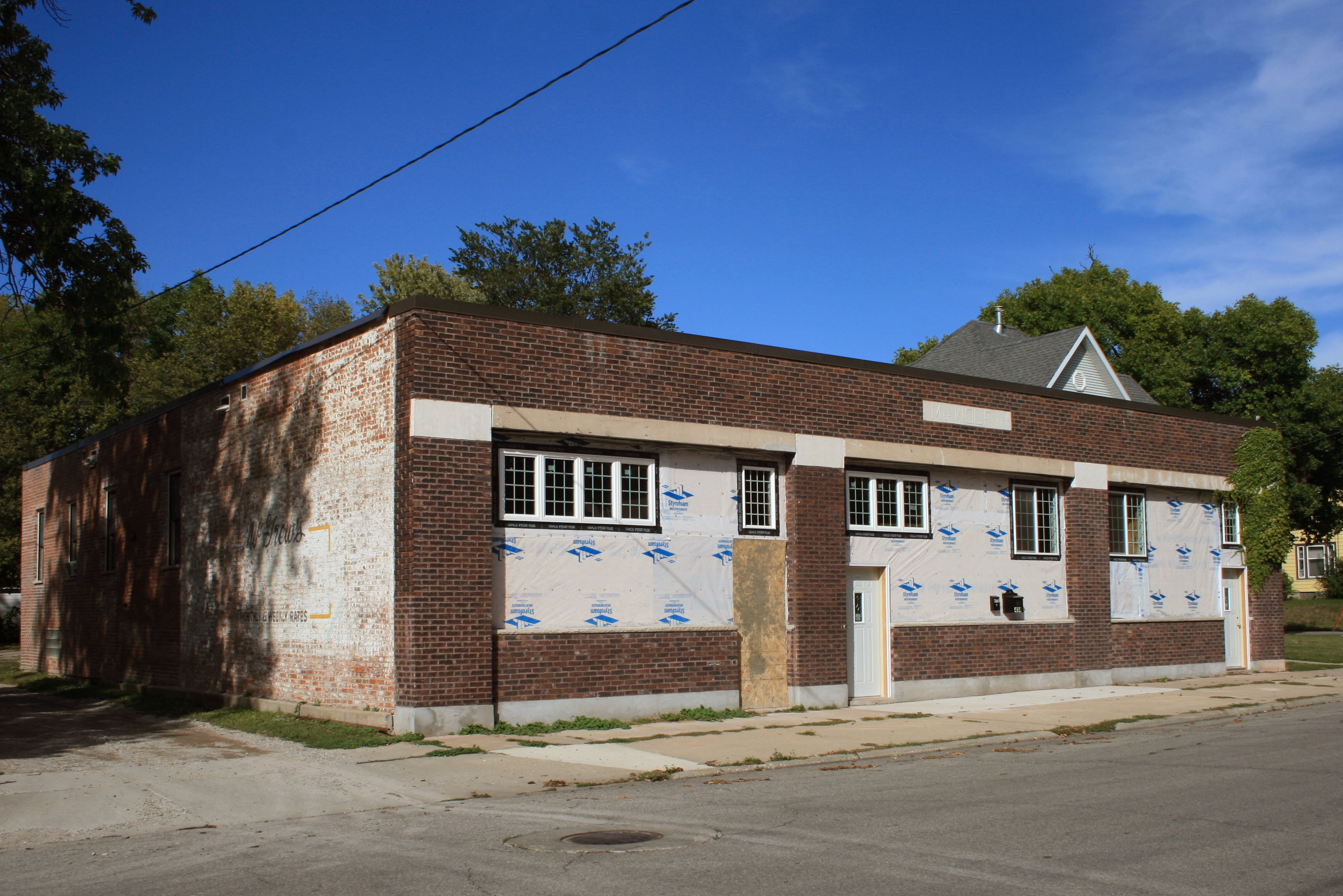

- Location within Iowa Location within the United States
- Location: 408-410 2nd St., NW. Mason City, Iowa
- Coordinates: 43°09′13.6″N 93°12′28.3″W
- Area: less than one acre
- Built: 1915
- Architectural style: Early Commercial
- NRHP reference No.: 02001543
- Added to NRHP: December 20, 2002

Hotel Lester-Lester Cafe, also known as the Dodge House-Long Branch, is a historic building located in Mason City, Iowa, United States. Its construction, completed in 1915, was a project undertaken by local real estate developer Meir Wolf. Built as a two-story building a block away from the passenger and freight depots of the Chicago and North Western Railroad and the Chicago Great Western Railway. The building was intended as a railroad hotel, allowing passengers and rail employees to avoid the six- to eight-block trip downtown. It is the only remaining railroad hotel left in Mason City. Hotel guests stayed in the 29 rooms on the second floor, and three commercial spaces on the first floor were occupied by a variety of restaurants, grocery stores and barbershops. Its most famous guest was track star Jesse Owens, who was in town in December 1937 for a basketball exhibition. He could not stay at the other hotels in town because of his race. In 1975, The hotel was renamed the Dodge House, with the Long Branch Saloon replacing the former café. By that time it was largely used as a rooming house, and it was used to house the homeless. The building was listed on the National Register of Historic Places in 2002.

An arsonist set fire to the building on September 6, 2006, and did significant damage to the structure. It had been vacant for five years at that time. In 2007, the second floor was removed and the first floor converted into four apartments.
