= Mason City Engine House No. 2 =

- U.S. National Register of Historic Places
- Location within Iowa Location within the United States
- Location: 2020 S. Federal Ave. Mason City, Iowa
- Coordinates: 43°7′54.33″N 93°12′5.13″W
- Area: less than one acre
- Built: 1939
- Built by: Rye & Henkel
- Architect: Hansen & Waggoner
- Architectural style: PWA Moderne
- NRHP reference No.: 100008368
- Added to NRHP: November 8, 2022

Mason City Engine House No. 2 is a historic building located in Mason City, Iowa, United States. As the city grew in population and expanded in size in the early 20th century, there was a need to add to the city's fire protection. A 1931 study recommended a new fire station on the south side. Seven years later, the New Deal-era Public Works Administration (PWA) approved funding for Mason City's second fire station and a new water tower. Property was acquired the same year. The local architectural firm of Hansen & Waggoner submitted plans for the new fire station in 1939, and local contractor Rye & Henkel won approval to build it. The PWA provided 45% of the funding with the remainder from local sources.

Architecturally, the structure is PWA Moderne, but it favors the Art Deco style over Streamline Moderne. Distinctive features include the hose-drying tower with its layered panels and central vertical piers and the lettering over the fire truck door that is indented into the brick.

The new engine company moved into the new station at the end of 1939 and it remained an active fire station until 1973 when it was closed by the city. The building was listed on the National Register of Historic Places in 2022.
