= Wagner-Mozart Music Hall =

- U.S. National Register of Historic Places
- Location within Iowa Location within the United States
- Location: 1st St., NE. and Delaware Ave. Mason City, Iowa
- Coordinates: 43°09′09″N 93°11′56″W
- Area: less than one acre
- Built: 1936
- Architects: Hansen & Waggoner
- Architectural style: Moderne
- NRHP reference No.: 78001210
- Added to NRHP: November 16, 1978

Wagner-Mozart Music Hall was a historic building located in Mason City, Iowa, United States. Built in 1936, this was one of, if not the first, building designed for a school music program. The concrete and brick Moderne structure was designed by Hansen & Waggoner, and built by local workers from the Works Progress Administration who used local materials. The building contained rehearsal space for instrumental music programs and a large band and orchestra room. There were two entrances into the building with caps above them. One was marked "Wagner" and the other "Mozart." One entrance led into a student vestibule that led to the rehearsal rooms and instrument storage, and the other entrance led to a public vestibule that led to the auditorium/band room. The building was also made available for community meetings and other non-music functions. It was listed on the National Register of Historic Places in 1978. It has subsequently been torn down.
