= C. P. Shipley House =

Historic house in Iowa, United States

- U.S. National Register of Historic Places
- Location within Iowa Location within the United States
- Location: 114 3rd St., NW; Mason City, Iowa
- Coordinates: 43°09′16.9″N 93°12′10.8″W
- Area: less than one acre
- Built: 1913
- Architectural style: Prairie School
- MPS: Prairie School Architecture in Mason City TR
- NRHP reference No.: 80001440
- Added to NRHP: January 29, 1980

The C. P. Shipley House was a historic building located in Mason City, Iowa, United States. Clinton Pardes Shipley (1851–1936) was a native of Baltimore County, Maryland. He married Margaret A. McMillin (1853–1940) in Mason City on November 17, 1875. The two-story Prairie School house, completed in 1913, had a stucco exterior, a broad hip roof and overhanging eaves. It was listed on the National Register of Historic Places in 1980. The house has subsequently been torn down. The Globe Gazette building is now on the property.
