= John L. Etzel House =

Historic house in Iowa, United States

- U.S. National Register of Historic Places
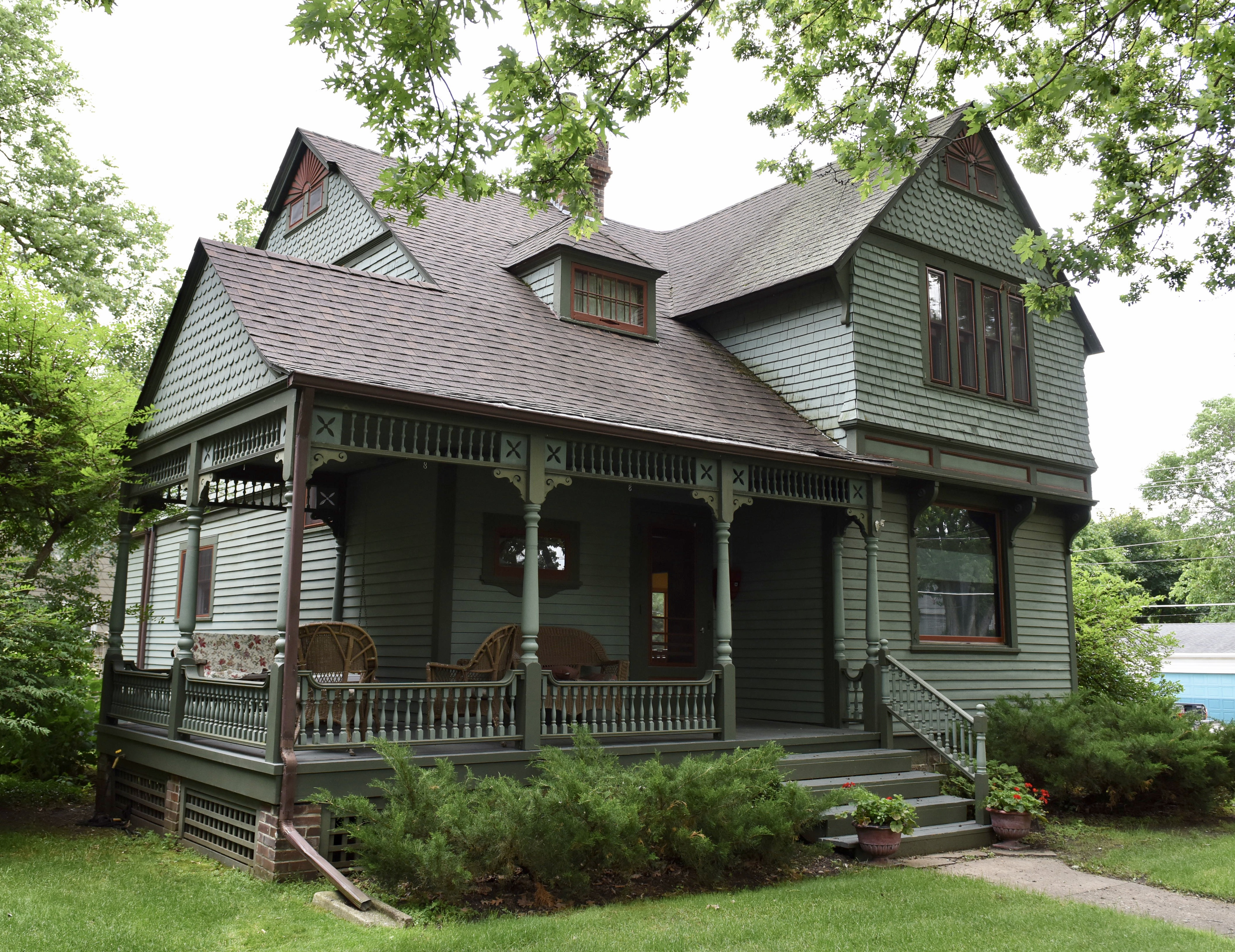

- Location within Iowa Location within the United States
- Location: 214 N. 3rd St. Clear Lake, Iowa
- Coordinates: 43°08′17.4″N 93°23′2.4″W
- Area: less than one acre
- Built: 1894
- Architectural style: Late Victorian
- NRHP reference No.: 83000347
- Added to NRHP: January 27, 1983

The John L. Etzel House is a historic building located in Clear Lake, Iowa, United States. Etzel was a local merchant and financier. He was an incorporator and served as president of the Cerro Gordo State Bank. He and his brother George founded Clear Lake Electric Light and Power Company and he served as its president. Etzel was appointed the local postmaster in 1885. He was the first person to own this house, which is an example of late Victorian eclectic design. It was one of seven similar houses that were built by local banker Frank Rogers between 1890 and 1910. Completed in 1894, the two-story frame house features an irregular plan. The second story of the main facade is cantilevered over the first story, and supported by four ornate brackets. The gabled front porch, which extends beyond the side of the house, has turned posts and gingerbread ornamentation. It was listed on the National Register of Historic Places in 1983.

The home was purchased in 1990 by Roberta and Joseph Rich who painstakingly have restored the porches and exterior to its original look and styles. They continue the upkeep of the home today.
