= F.M. Norris House =

Historic house in Iowa, United States

- U.S. National Register of Historic Places
- Location within Iowa Location within the United States
- Location: 108 4th St., NE. Mason City, Iowa
- Coordinates: 43°09′20.4″N 93°11′56.4″W
- Area: less than one acre
- Built: 1913
- Built by: Chris Rye
- Architectural style: Prairie School
- MPS: Prairie School Architecture in Mason City TR
- NRHP reference No.: 80001436
- Added to NRHP: January 29, 1980

The F.M. Norris House, also known as the Patton House and the Gerard Photography Studio, was a historic building located in Mason City, Iowa, United States. Fred Magee Norris (1864–1938) served two terms as the mayor of the city. He was married to Elizabeth (Atkinson) Norris (1866–1933). They had Chris Rye build this Prairie School house for them. While Rye built some of Walter Burley Griffin's designs, it is possible that he designed this house himself. It featured a horizontal emphasis, wide eaves, broad hip roof, and stucco walls. The building was altered by Jerome J. Gerard (1913–2010) for his photography studio. In addition to his photographic work, he wrote for the magazine Popular Photography for 20 years. The house was listed on the National Register of Historic Places in 1980. It has subsequently been torn down.
