= Tessa Youngblood House =

Historic house in Iowa, United States

- U.S. National Register of Historic Places
- U.S. Historic district – Contributing property
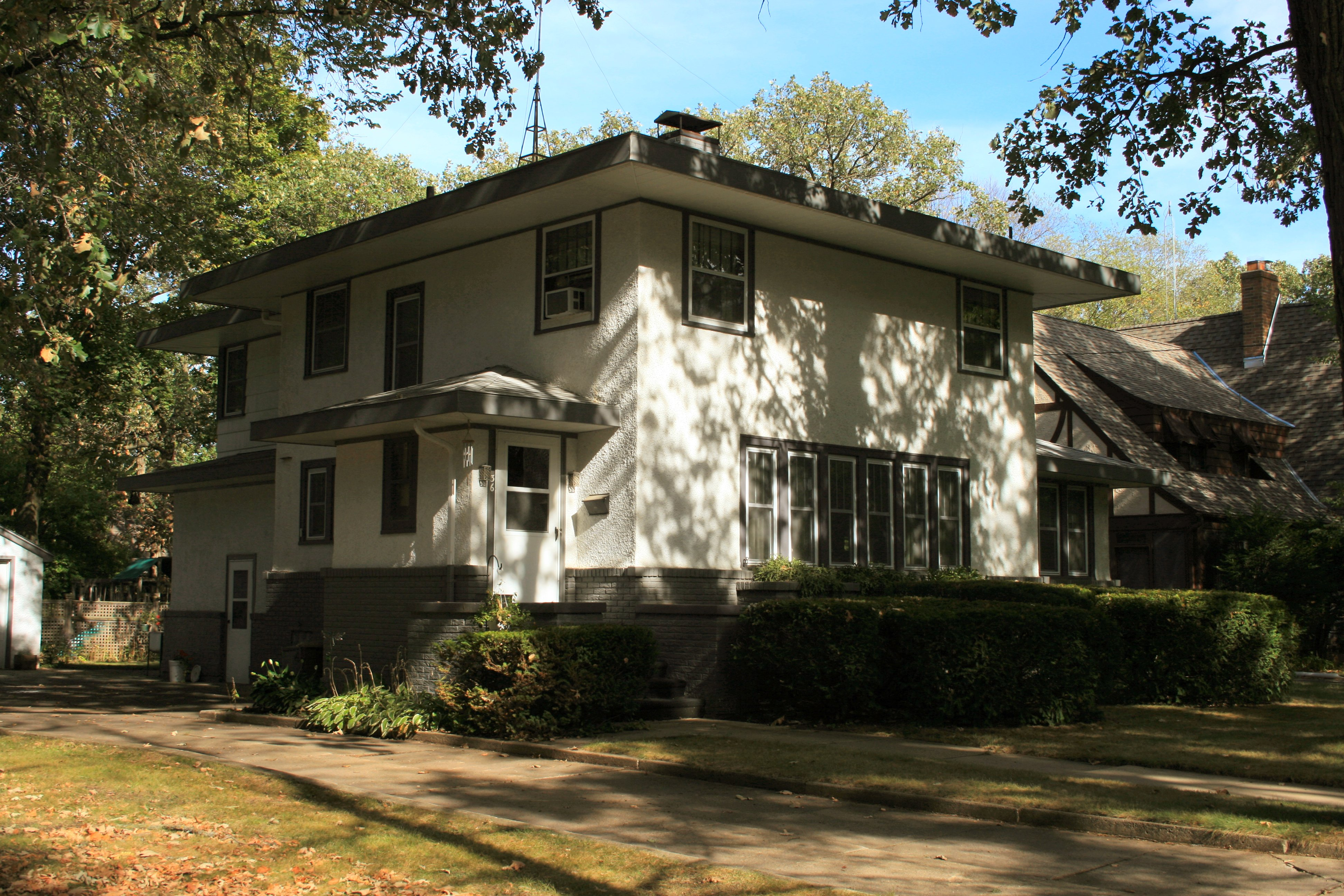

- Location within Iowa Location within the United States
- Location: 36 Oak Dr. Mason City, Iowa
- Coordinates: 43°09′06.4″N 93°12′50.7″W
- Area: less than one acre
- Built: 1922
- Built by: John Taylor
- Architectural style: Prairie School
- Part of: Forest Park Historic District (ID14001167)
- MPS: Prairie School Architecture in Mason City TR
- NRHP reference No.: 80001444
- Added to NRHP: January 29, 1980

The Tessa Youngblood House is a historic building located in Mason City, Iowa, United States. Completed in 1922, the house is attributed to local contractor John Taylor. The two-story structure features a stuccoed exterior above a brick base, and a heavy roof design with a deep fascia. The attached garage in the back was converted into a room in 1958, and at the same time the second story room above it was added. A detached garage was built the same year. The house was listed on the National Register of Historic Places in 1980. In 2015 the house and the garage were included as contributing properties in the Forest Park Historic District.
