= Jewell Apartments =

- U.S. National Register of Historic Places
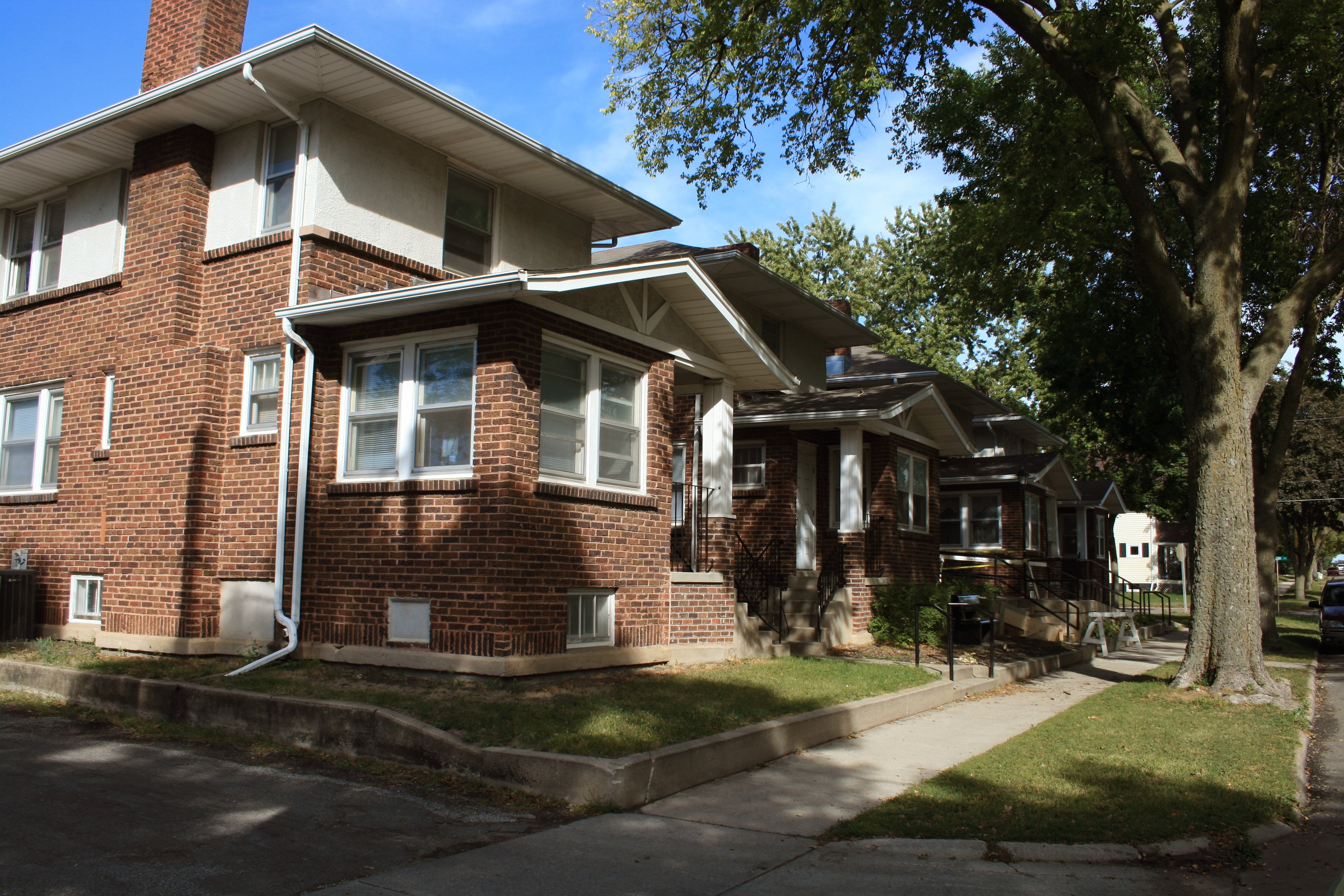

- Location within Iowa Location within the United States
- Location: 404-412 1st St., NW. Mason City, Iowa
- Coordinates: 43°09′10.4″N 93°12′27.8″W
- Area: less than one acre
- Built: 1917
- Built by: Fred Lippert
- Architectural style: Prairie School
- MPS: Prairie School Architecture in Mason City TR
- NRHP reference No.: 80001434
- Added to NRHP: January 29, 1980

The Jewell Apartments is a historic building located in Mason City, Iowa, United States. Completed in 1917 by local contractor Fred Lippert, this apartment building is two C-shaped buildings joined together.

Lippert may have also designed the building. Its Prairie School design creates a harmonious unity for this urban housing structure. The exterior of the two-story building features brick on the lower two-thirds and stucco on the upper third. The building was listed on the National Register of Historic Places in 1980.
