= Charles Seney House =

Historic house in Iowa, United States

- U.S. National Register of Historic Places
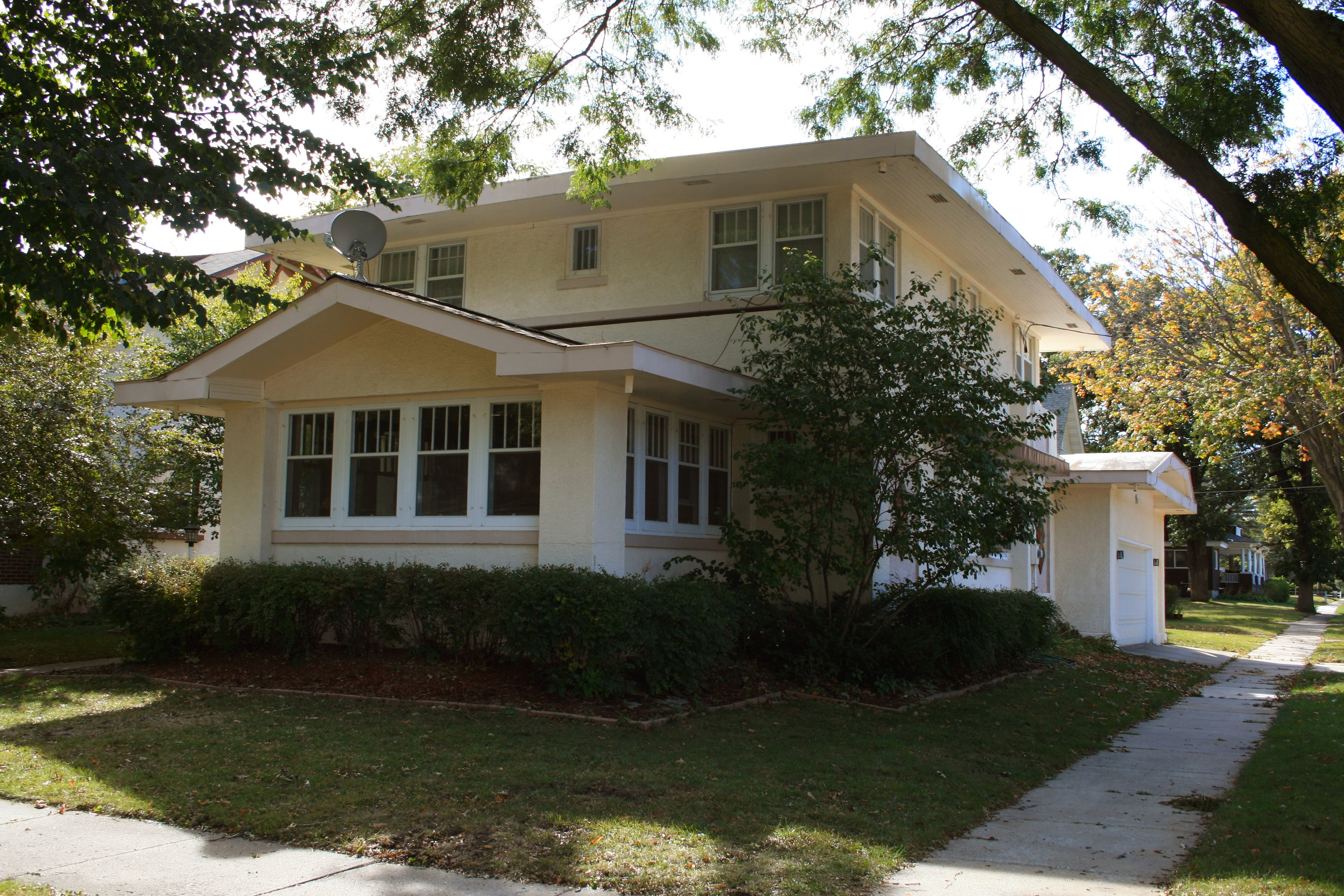

- Location within Iowa Location within the United States
- Location: 109 7th St., NW. and 622 N. Washington St., Mason City, Iowa
- Coordinates: 43°09′28.7″N 93°12′10.8″W
- Area: less than one acre
- Built: 1913
- Architectural style: Prairie School
- MPS: Prairie School Architecture in Mason City TR
- NRHP reference No.: 80001439
- Added to NRHP: January 29, 1980

The Charles Seney House, also known as the Van Heel Residence, is a historic building located in Mason City, Iowa, United States. This house is attributed to local architect Einar Broaten and built by Sivert Rivedal, a native of Norway. It utilizes the Mason City variant of the Prairie School style to stucco over corbelled masonry to form the wall panels for visual effect. The two-story house, completed in 1913, is capped with a hip roof. It was listed on the National Register of Historic Places in 1980.
