= Duncan Rule House =

Historic house in Iowa, United States

- U.S. National Register of Historic Places
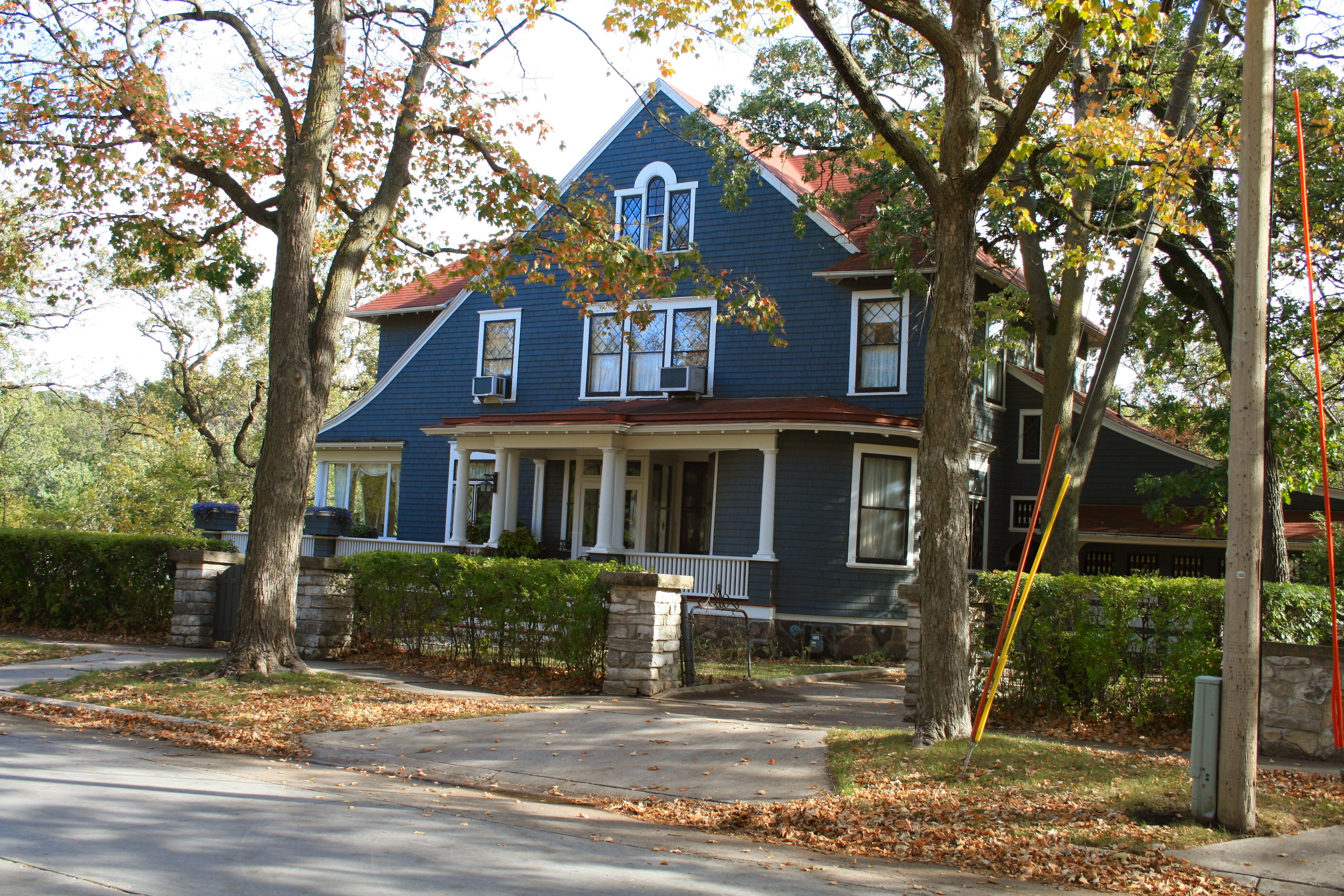

- Location within Iowa Location within the United States
- Location: 321 2nd St., SE; Mason City, Iowa
- Coordinates: 43°08′59.3″N 93°11′42.7″W
- Area: less than one acre
- Built: 1909
- Built by: E.R. Bogardus
- Architectural style: Shingle Style
- NRHP reference No.: 79000886
- Added to NRHP: October 16, 1979

The Duncan Rule House is a historic building located in Mason City, Iowa, United States. Rule was an attorney who hired E.R. Bogardus, a local builder to design and construct this house. The 2½-story frame structure features a large gable on the north and south elevations of the house. It is one of the few houses in the Shingle Style in Iowa that has an open gable like this. Other elements of the house include the semi-circular bay on the main floor with a somewhat asymmetrically placed veranda adjacent to it. There is also a Palladian window in the attic. The house was listed on the National Register of Historic Places in 1979.
