= E.R. Gibson House =

Historic house in Iowa, United States

- U.S. National Register of Historic Places
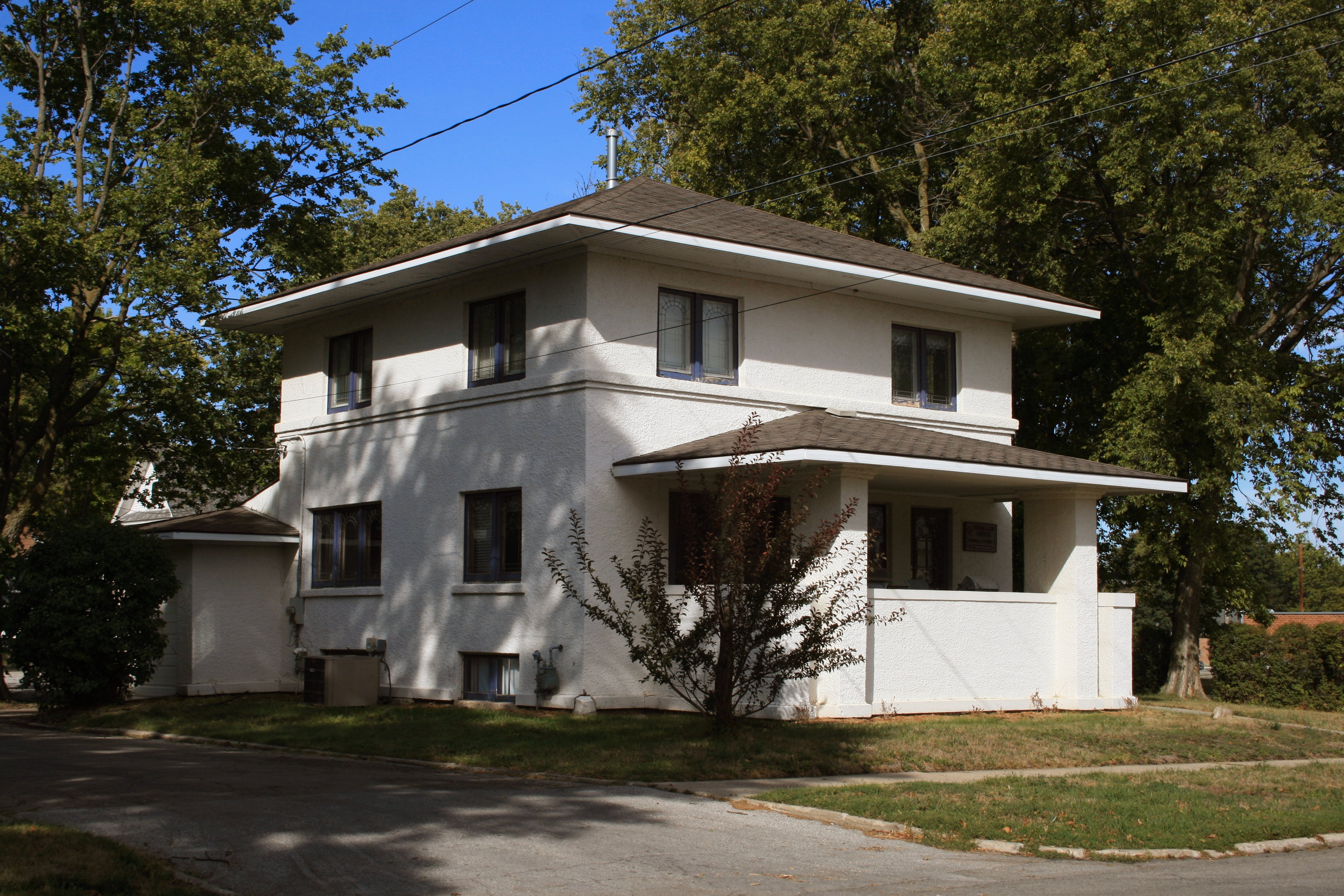

- Location within Iowa Location within the United States
- Location: 114 4th St., NW. Mason City, Iowa
- Coordinates: 43°09′20.1″N 93°12′12″W
- Area: less than one acre
- Built: 1912
- Architectural style: Prairie School
- MPS: Prairie School Architecture in Mason City TR
- NRHP reference No.: 80001433
- Added to NRHP: January 29, 1980

The E.R. Gibson House is a historic building located in Mason City, Iowa, United States. Built in 1912, this two-story stucco structure exhibits a strong Prairie School influence. It features a wide eaves, hip roof, a central chimney, and casement windows of leaded glass. The house was listed on the National Register of Historic Places in 1980.
