= Lippert House =

Historic house in Iowa, United States

- U.S. National Register of Historic Places
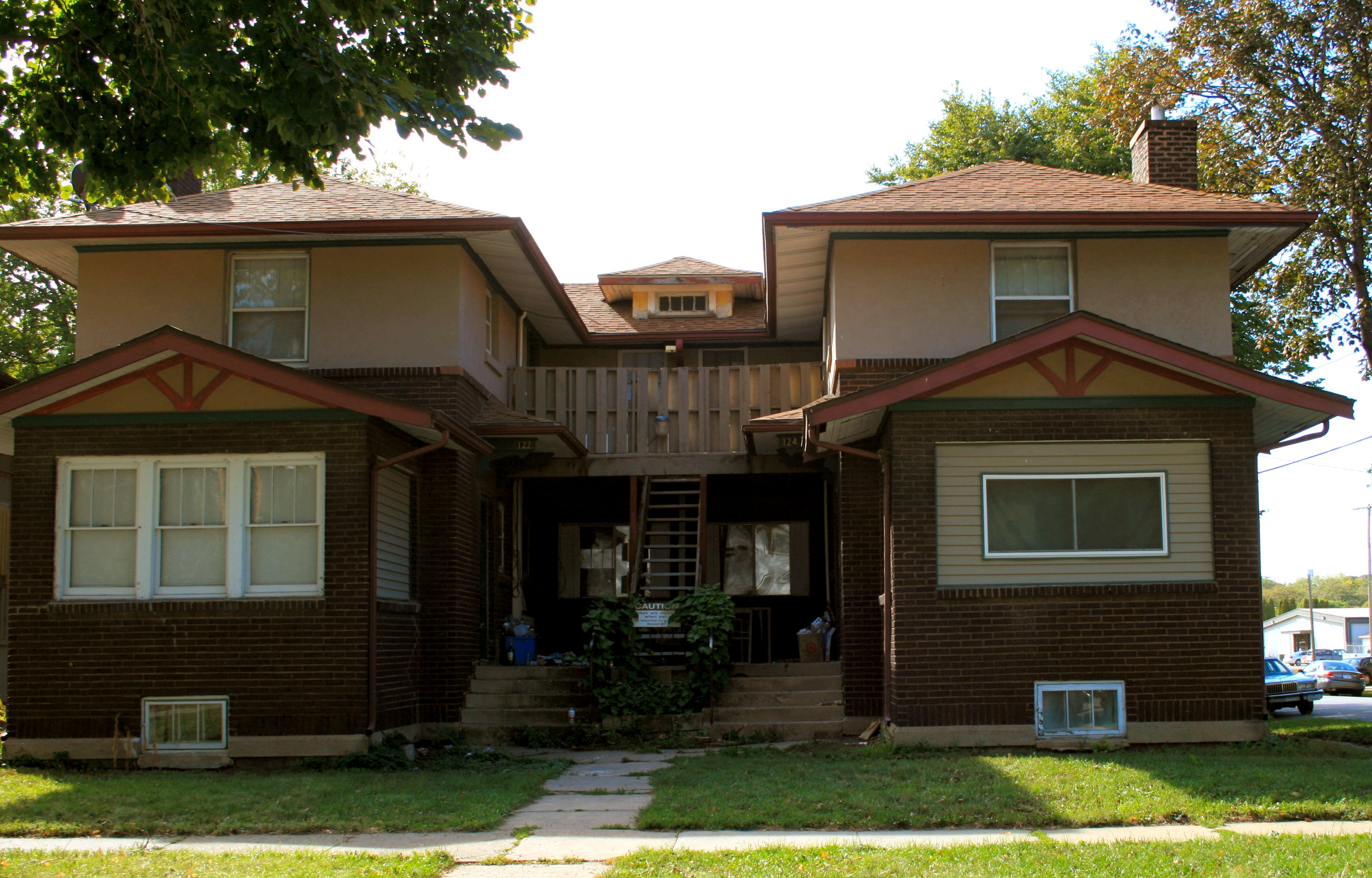

- Location within Iowa Location within the United States
- Location: 122-124 N. Madison Ave. Mason City, Iowa
- Coordinates: 43°09′12.4″N 93°12′27.6″W
- Area: less than one acre
- Built: 1915
- Architectural style: Prairie School
- MPS: Prairie School Architecture in Mason City TR
- NRHP reference No.: 80001435
- Added to NRHP: January 29, 1980

The Lippert House is a historic building located in Mason City, Iowa, United States. Built in 1923, this two-story duplex is significant for its C-shaped plan and strong Prairie School influences. It features brick on the first floor, stucco on the second, wide eaves, broad hip roof, and a common utility wall. The house was listed on the National Register of Historic Places in 1980.
