= National Register of Historic Places listings in Winneshiek County, Iowa =

Location of Winneshiek County in Iowa

This is a list of the National Register of Historic Places listings in Winneshiek County, Iowa.

This is intended to be a complete list of the properties and districts on the National Register of Historic Places in Winneshiek County, Iowa, United States. Latitude and longitude coordinates are provided for many National Register properties and districts; these locations may be seen together in a map.

There are 34 properties and districts listed on the National Register in the county. Five other properties have been delisted.

This National Park Service list is complete through NPS recent listings posted March 21, 2025.

	Name on the Register	Image	Date listed	Location	City or town	Description
1	Birdsall Lime Kiln		March 21, 1979 (#79000948)	Northeast of Decorah; 43°18′08″N 91°46′02″W	Decorah	
2	Broadway-Phelps Park Historic District	Broadway-Phelps Park Historic District	November 13, 1976 (#76000813)	West Broadway from Winnebago Street to Park Drive, also 202 Winnebago St., 307 West Main St. 43°18′01″N 91°47′35″W	Decorah	Second set of address represent a boundary increase approved March 14, 2022
3	Burr Oak House/Masters Hotel	Burr Oak House/Masters Hotel	January 27, 1983 (#83000410)	State Street; 43°27′28″N 91°51′56″W	Burr Oak	Laura Ingalls Wilder Museum
4	Burr Oak Savings Bank	Burr Oak Savings Bank	August 8, 2001 (#01000857)	3608 236th Ave. 43°27′30″N 91°51′55″W	Burr Oak	Museum Visitor Center
5	Calmar Passenger Depot	Calmar Passenger Depot	March 21, 2011 (#11000137)	201 N. Maryville St. 43°11′02″N 91°51′53″W	Calmar	Advent & Development of Railroads in Iowa MPS
6	Cooley-Whitney House	Cooley-Whitney House	January 25, 1980 (#80001461)	305 Grove St. 43°12′45″N 91°48′03″W	Decorah	
7	Decorah Commercial Historic District	Decorah Commercial Historic District	August 21, 2017 (#100001482)	Blocks 500-100 W. Water, 100-200 E. Water, 100 Washington, 100 Winnebago, parts of W. Main, Court & W. Day Spring; 43°18′15″N 91°47′16″W	Decorah	
8	Decorah Hospital		June 20, 2023 (#100009067)	305 Montgomery St. 43°18′06″N 91°46′37″W	Decorah	
9	Decorah Ice Cave	Decorah Ice Cave	December 20, 1978 (#78001269)	Ice Cave Road; 43°18′38″N 91°47′03″W	Decorah	
10	Decorah Municipal Bathhouse and Swimming Pool	Decorah Municipal Bathhouse and Swimming Pool	January 30, 2012 (#11001057)	701 College Dr. 43°18′49″N 91°48′05″W	Decorah	
11	Decorah Woolen Mill	Decorah Woolen Mill	January 26, 2001 (#00001681)	107 Court St. 43°18′18″N 91°47′18″W	Decorah	
12	Ellsworth-Porter House	Ellsworth-Porter House	August 6, 1975 (#75000702)	401 West Broadway; 43°17′59″N 91°47′48″W	Decorah	Porter House Museum
13	Fort Atkinson Bridge	Fort Atkinson Bridge	May 15, 1998 (#98000460)	150th Street over the Turkey River; 43°09′12″N 91°55′43″W	Fort Atkinson	
14	Fort Atkinson Historic District	Fort Atkinson Historic District	February 27, 2013 (#13000036)	2nd St. & 8th Ave. 43°08′45″N 91°56′22″W	Fort Atkinson	U.S. Army fort maintained 1840–1853 to oversee Ho-Chunk people relocated from Wisconsin. Now Fort Atkinson State Preserve.
15	Frankville School	Frankville School	November 14, 1978 (#78001272)	State Street; 43°11′20″N 91°37′18″W	Frankville	
16	Gilliece Bridge		May 15, 1998 (#98000464)	Cattle Creek Road over the Upper Iowa River; 43°24′54″N 91°57′32″W	Bluffton	Destroyed by overweight truck May 2017
17	Highlandville School	Highlandville School	February 5, 2014 (#13001141)	3499 Highlandville Rd. 43°26′34″N 91°40′06″W	Decorah	
18	Horn House	Horn House	March 25, 1977 (#77000568)	Northwest of Decorah; 43°20′33″N 91°49′32″W	Decorah	
19	Jacobson Farm	Jacobson Farm	June 14, 1982 (#82002645)	Junction of County Road W42 and 162nd Street, southeast of Decorah; 43°10′21″N 91°45′54″W	Decorah	
20	Kinney Octagon Barn	Kinney Octagon Barn	November 19, 1986 (#86003191)	Off U.S. Route 52; 43°28′21″N 91°52′04″W	Burr Oak	
21	Koren Library	Koren Library	January 12, 1984 (#84001610)	Luther College campus 43°18′38″N 91°48′14″W	Decorah	
22	Lawrence Bridge		May 15, 1998 (#98000462)	330th Avenue over the Little Turkey River; 43°04′58″N 92°03′08″W	Jackson Junction	
23	Locust School	Locust School	May 22, 1978 (#78001270)	North of Decorah; 43°25′14″N 91°43′22″W	Decorah	
24	Luther College Campus Historic District	Luther College Campus Historic District	March 2, 2021 (#100006184)	700 College Dr. 43°18′45″N 91°48′10″W	Decorah	
25	Luther College Farm	Luther College Farm	July 17, 1979 (#79000949)	Luther College campus 43°19′04″N 91°48′05″W	Decorah	
26	Norris Miller House	Norris Miller House	June 8, 1976 (#76000814)	118 N. Mill St. 43°18′19″N 91°47′31″W	Decorah	Part of Vesterheim Norwegian-American Museum
27	Milwaukee and St. Paul Railway Combination Depot	Milwaukee and St. Paul Railway Combination Depot	September 12, 2016 (#16000609)	203 W. Pearl St. 43°17′55″N 91°47′15″W	Decorah	
28	Ossian Opera House	Ossian Opera House	June 18, 1979 (#79000950)	Main Street; 43°08′41″N 91°45′53″W	Ossian	
29	Painter-Bernatz Mill	Painter-Bernatz Mill	January 11, 1974 (#74000816)	200 N. Mill St. 43°18′21″N 91°47′32″W	Decorah	Part of Vesterheim Norwegian-American Museum
30	Steyer Bridge	Steyer Bridge	January 4, 1983 (#83000411)	Oneata Road off U.S. Route 52; 43°17′54″N 91°48′39″W	Decorah	
31	Steyer Opera House	Steyer Opera House	January 24, 1980 (#80001462)	102-104 W. Water St. 43°18′12″N 91°47′21″W	Decorah	
32	Wenzil Taylor Building	Wenzil Taylor Building	March 21, 1979 (#79000951)	Main Street; 43°12′20″N 91°57′13″W	Spillville	
33	Upper Bluffton Bridge		May 15, 1998 (#98000458)	Ravine Road over the Upper Iowa River; 43°24′18″N 91°55′12″W	Bluffton	
34	Washington Prairie Methodist Church	Washington Prairie Methodist Church	January 29, 1980 (#80001463)	Southeast of Decorah; 43°14′17″N 91°44′38″W	Decorah	

== Former listings ==
Five properties were once listed on the Register, but have been removed:

	Name on the Register	Image	Date listed	Date removed	Location	City or town	Description
1	Big Stone Mills	Big Stone Mills	July 15, 2009 (#09000516)	December 19, 2014	113 North Main Street; 43°12′27″N 91°57′03″W	Spillville	Demolished June 23, 2011.
2	Clarksville Diner		December 10, 1993 (#93001356)	May 8, 2002	504 Heivly Street	Decorah	Sold to a French media company and was shipped to Paris, France.
3	Decorah East Side Elementary and Middle School	Decorah East Side Elementary and Middle School	September 25, 1998 (#98001204)	September 10, 2008	210 Vernon Street	Decorah	
4	Freeport Bowstring Arch Bridge	Freeport Bowstring Arch Bridge	April 19, 1984 (#84001407)	September 10, 2008	Spans Upper Iowa River	Freeport vicinity	Delisted after relocation to Trout Run Park in Decorah.
5	Ten Mile Creek Bridge	Ten Mile Creek Bridge	May 15, 1998 (#98000466)	May 2, 2017	Happy Hollow Road over Ten Mile Creek; 43°20′17″N 91°53′18″W	Decorah	
6	Turkey River Bridge		May 15, 1998 (#98000468)	October 15, 2014	Little Church Road over the Turkey River; 43°05′06″N 91°53′38″W	Festina vicinity	Demolished and replaced in 2010

== See also ==
- List of National Historic Landmarks in Iowa
- National Register of Historic Places listings in Iowa
- Listings in neighboring counties: Allamakee, Chickasaw, Clayton, Fayette, Fillmore (MN), Houston (MN), Howard
