= Taylor Building =

Taylor Building may refer to:

- Taylor Building (Little Rock, Arkansas), listed on the NRHP in Arkansas
- Taylor Carpet Company Building, Indianapolis, IN, listed on the NRHP in Indiana
- Wenzil Taylor Building, Spillville, IA, listed on the NRHP in Iowa
- Lucy Hobbs Taylor Building, Lawrence, KS, listed on the NRHP in Kansas
- Wright and Taylor Building, Louisville, KY, listed on the NRHP in Kentucky
- Taylor-Olive Building, St. Louis, MO, listed on the NRHP in Missouri
- Taylor Building (Arlington, Virginia), a building
