= Jacobson Farm =

- U.S. National Register of Historic Places
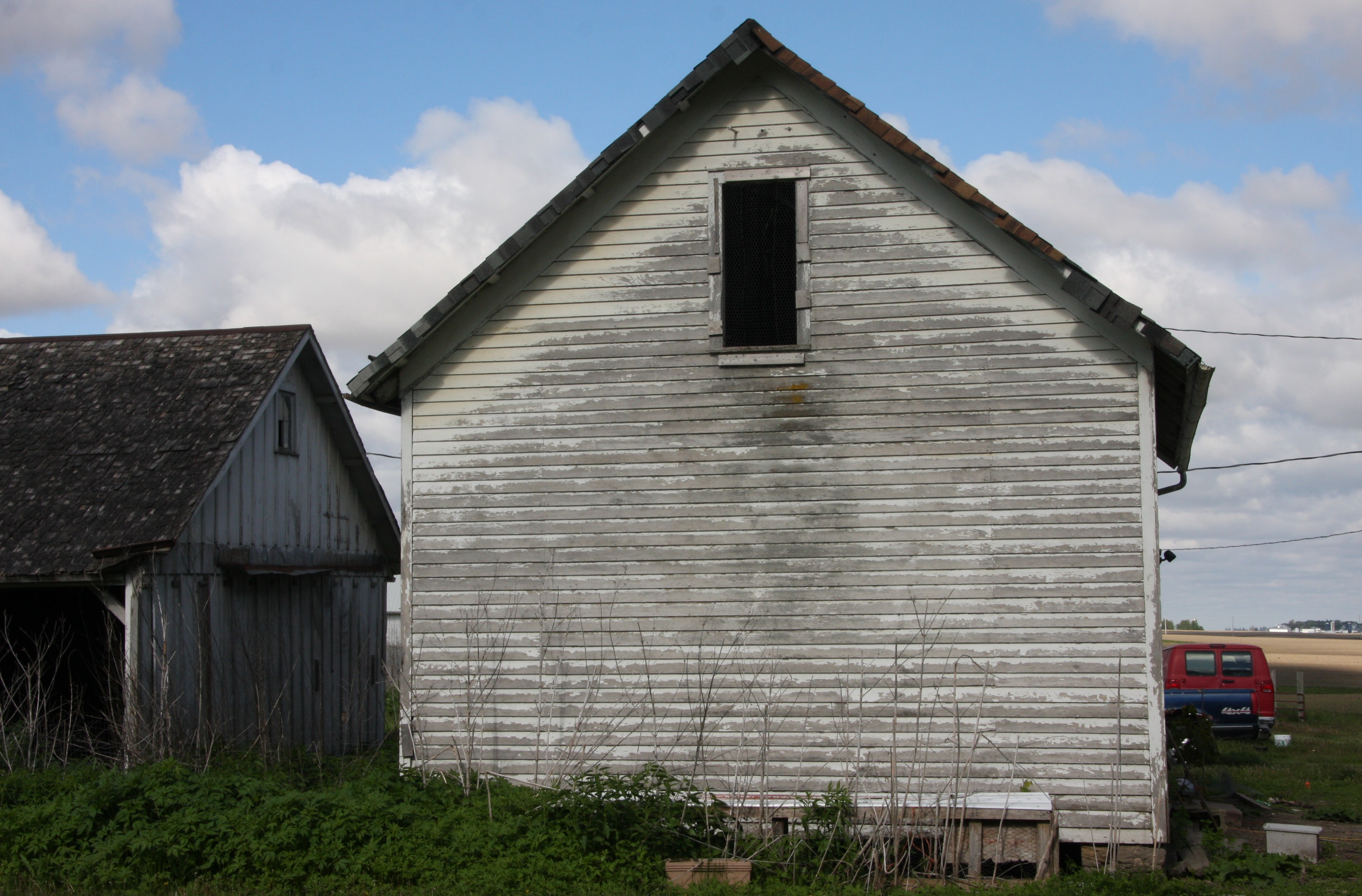
- Two buildings on the Jacobson Farm in 2017

- Location within Iowa Location within the United States
- Location: Southeast of Decorah
- Coordinates: 43°10′21″N 91°45′54″W
- Area: 10.09 acres (4.08 ha)
- Built: 1850-1908
- NRHP reference No.: 82002645
- Added to NRHP: June 14, 1982

The Jacobson Farm is located southeast of Decorah, Iowa, United States. It was owned and operated by the Jacobson family for 127 years. One generation overlapped the next, which led to a gradual evolution of changes instead of sudden changes. This evolution is exemplified in the house and barn, which have been altered over the years to accommodate changing needs but contain some of their original construction. The original portions of the buildings shows a mastery of Norwegian log construction. The later additions were also built according to the Norwegian tradition as independent units, but using framing techniques that adapted from American builders. There is also a substantial amount of written documentation in the form of letters, diaries, tax receipts, and photographs that help to precisely document the history of the farm.

Another historical aspect of the farm is its association with Abraham Jacobson, who was the second generation owner/operator. He had made a connection with Robert Todd Lincoln, the son of Abraham Lincoln, when he studied theology in Springfield, Illinois in the 1850s. The two remained in contact over the years. Jacobson served the Lutheran Church until he left the ministry in 1887 to take over the farm's operations. He also served as president of a mutual insurance company, conducted horticultural experiments, wrote for periodicals and newspapers, and served in the Iowa House of Representatives from 1903 to 1905. A direct link to his profile can be found https://www.legis.iowa.gov/legislators/legislator/legislatorAllYears?personID=3484

The farm was donated by the Jacobson family to the Vesterheim Norwegian-American Museum in 1977. It was listed on the National Register of Historic Places in 1982.
