= Ole Peter Petersen =

Norwegian-American clergyman

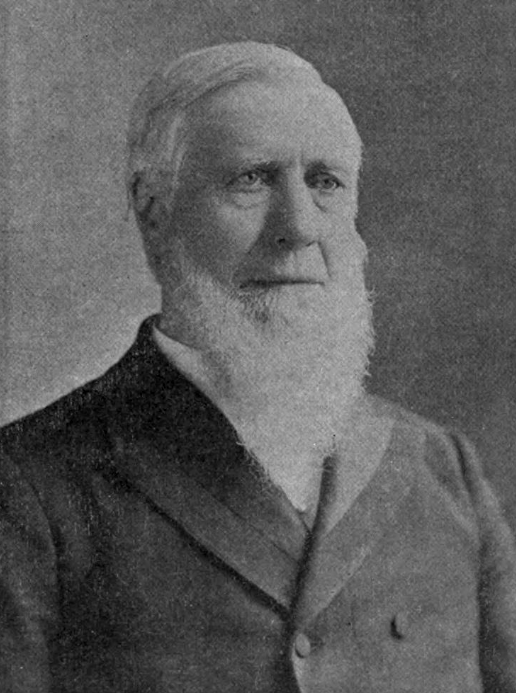
- Born: April 28, 1822; Fredrikstad, Norway
- Died: December 20, 1901 (aged 79); Brooklyn, New York, United States
- Burial place: Forest Home Cemetery
- Occupation: Clergyman
- Spouse: Anne Marie Amundsdatter (m. 1849; died 1883)
- Children: 4

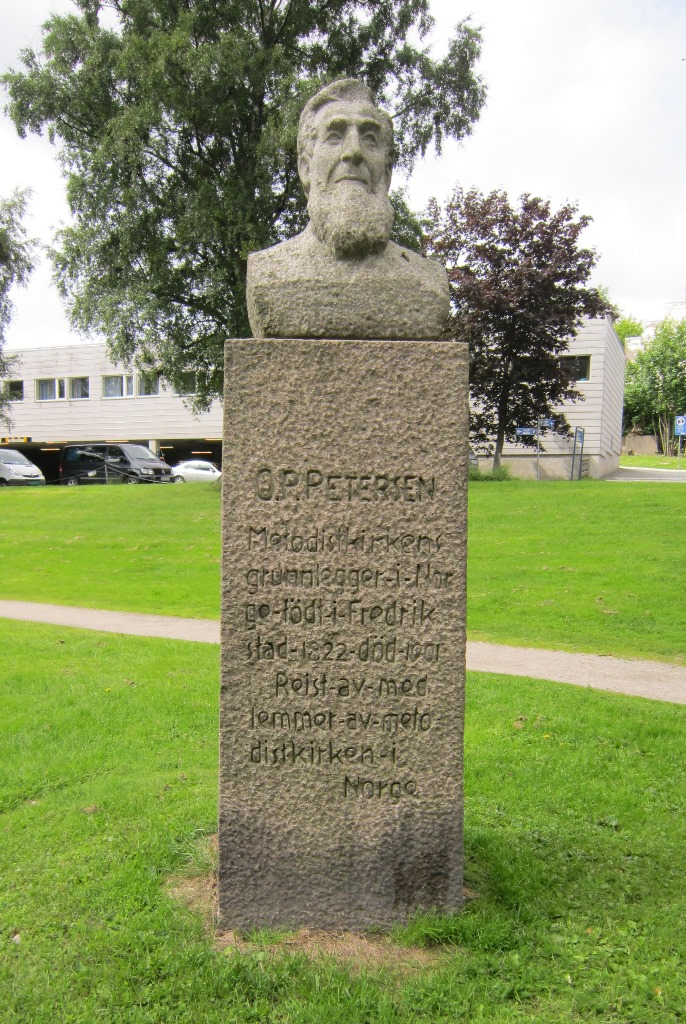
Memorial to Ole Peter Petersen near Fredrikstad station

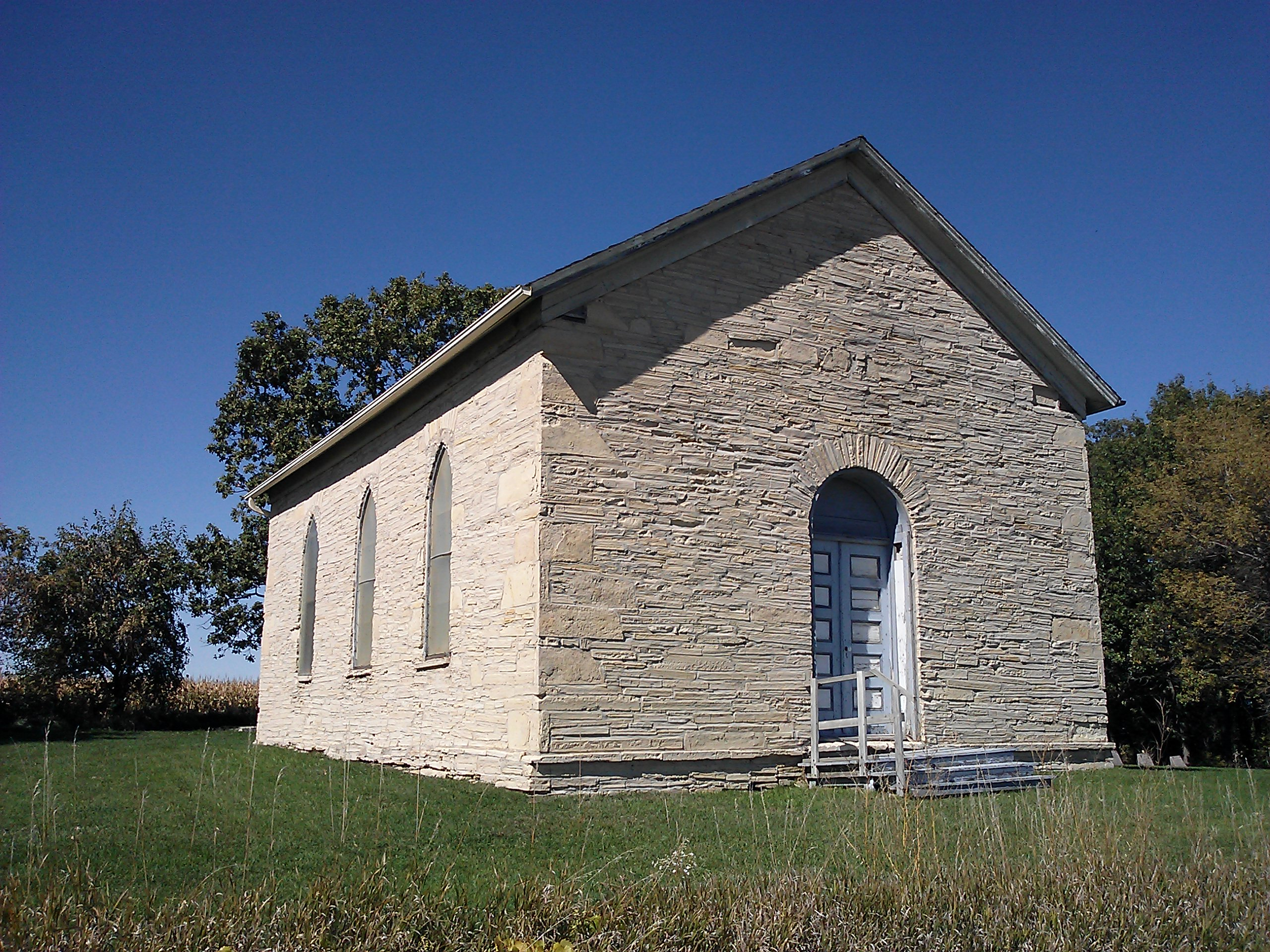
Washington Prairie Methodist Church

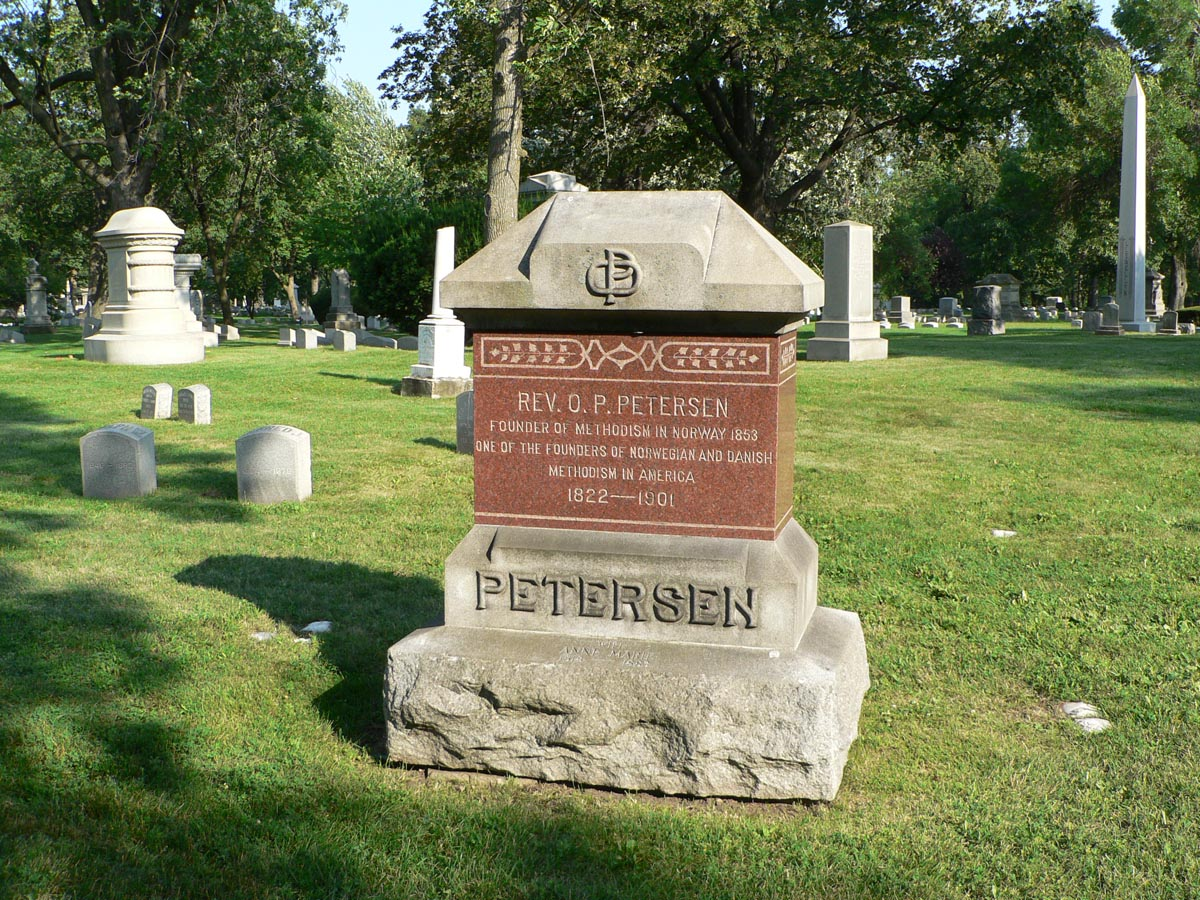
Rev. O. P. Petersen grave site at Forest Home Cemetery in Milwaukee, Wisconsin

Ole Peter Petersen (April 28, 1822 – December 20, 1901) was a Norwegian-American clergyman. He is credited as the founder of Methodism in Norway and co-founder of Norwegian and Danish Methodism in the United States.

== Biography ==
Ole Peter Petersen was born in Fredrikstad, Norway on April 28, 1822. His father, Peder Jørgensen (c. 1775–1826), was a ship's carpenter who went to sea without returning and was presumed dead. His mother, Sophie Cathrine Jensdatter (1791–1830), died when he was six years of age. He was raised as a foster child to a widow Thyre Tønder and her daughter Karine. Raised in a religious household, Petersen had thoughts of becoming a clergyman. However his low social status and lack of opportunity for higher education combined to discourage such a notion.

Petersen opted for the sea instead, leaving Fredrikstad in 1836 at the age of 14. Petersen arrived in the United States in 1844 and sailed a few years on American ships. In 1845, during a stop in Charleston, South Carolina, Petersen heard a series of sermons that brought him to a consciousness awareness of Methodism. He also came into contact with Swedish born pastor Olof Gustaf Hedstrom (1803–1877) who ministered among the sailors from the Bethel Ship John Wesley, a former cargo ship in New York Harbor (1845–1875). In 1847, Petersen became a member of the Methodist Church's Bethel Ship Mission in New York and was employed as Pastor Hedstrom's assistant. He subsequently became an ordained pastor.

In the spring of 1849, Petersen returned to Norway where he married Anne Marie Amundsdatter (1818–1883). In April 1850 they traveled to America where Petersen was employed at the Bethel Ship Mission in New York. Ole Peter Petersen first established a Methodist congregation among Norwegian immigrants at Washington Prairie in Iowa during 1852. Washington Prairie Methodist Church located outside Decorah, Iowa is considered the mother church of Norwegian-American Methodism. Petersen later returned to Norway where he established the first Methodist congregation in that country in Sarpsborg during 1856.

In the summer of 1859, Petersen returned to the United States with his wife and four children and worked again at the Bethel Ship Mission in New York. In 1869, he returned to Norway and was the superintendent of the Methodist Church mission. In 1871, Petersen returned to America and worked there for the rest of his life. He died in 1901 after founding a church in Brooklyn, New York. He was buried beside his wife, who died in 1883, and his son at Forest Home Cemetery in Milwaukee, Wisconsin.
