= Decorah Commercial Historic District =

Historic district in Iowa, United States

- U.S. National Register of Historic Places
- U.S. Historic district
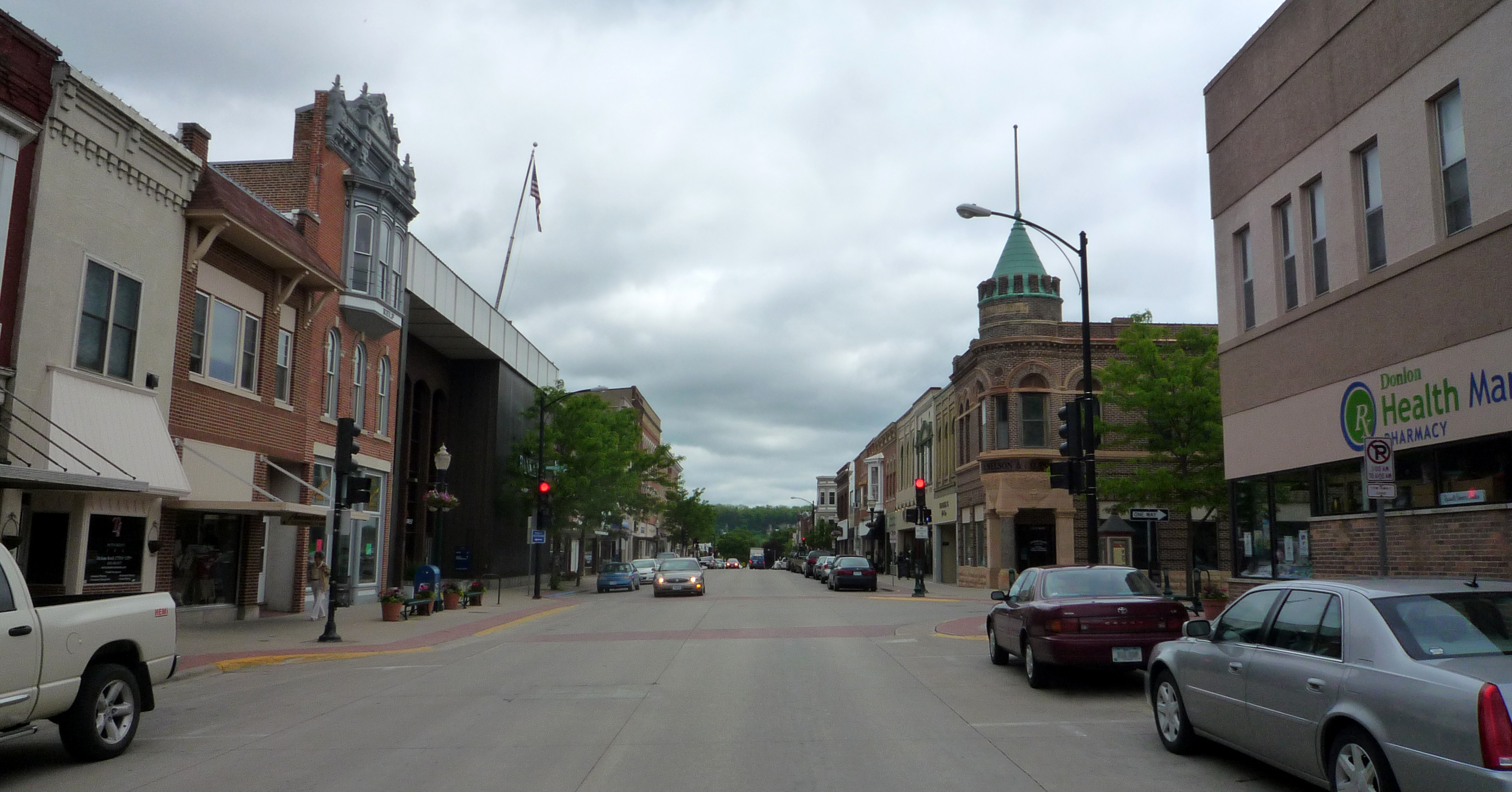
- Water Street in 2009

- Location within Iowa Location within the United States
- Location: Blks. 500-100 W. Water, 100-200 E. Water, 100 Washington, 100 Winnebago, parts of W. Main, Court & W. Day Spring, Decorah, Iowa
- Coordinates: 43°18′15″N 91°47′16″W
- Area: 20.1 acres (8.1 ha)
- Architectural style: Late Victorian; Late 19th and Early 20th century American Movements; Art Deco
- NRHP reference No.: 100001482
- Added to NRHP: August 21, 2017

The Decorah Commercial Historic District is a nationally recognized historic district located in Decorah, Iowa, United States. It was listed on the National Register of Historic Places in 2017. At the time of its nomination it contained 126 resources, which included 85 contributing buildings, one contributing structure, and 40 non-contributing buildings. The historic district covers most of the city's central business district. Water Street, which is a major thoroughfare through the district was named after a millrace (non-extant) that rerouted water from the Upper Iowa River to serve the needs of the mills and the commercial district. The land here is relatively flat and allowed for a linear shopping area. The Broadway–Phelps Park Historic District is largely a residential area that is located to the south.

The buildings in the district are primarily two to three stories tall and built with brick. There are, however, some stone and wood buildings. A majority of the buildings (60%) were built before 1899, with the oldest building from 1853. Another 27% were built between 1900 and 1960. As of 2017, the newest building was from 2014. The buildings are generally vernacular in style, but reflect the styles that were fashionable from the time they were built, including Italianate, Queen Anne, Romanesque, and Colonial Revival. Some of the buildings were designed by architects and built by local contractors, but the designers of most of the buildings are unknown. Architects of note include: Charles Altfillisch, Orff and Guilbert, Turnock & Ohrenstein, Mortimer Cleveland, Gatterdamn & Probst, and Robert Jamieson. General contractor A.R. Coffeen Co. was responsible for both new construction and remodeling old facades. The Decorah Woolen Mill (1867, 1920), the only mill left in the district, and the Steyer Opera House (1870, 1875) are individually listed on the National Register of Historic Places. The brick pavers on Court Street count as the contributing structure.
