= Washington Prairie Methodist Church =

- U.S. National Register of Historic Places
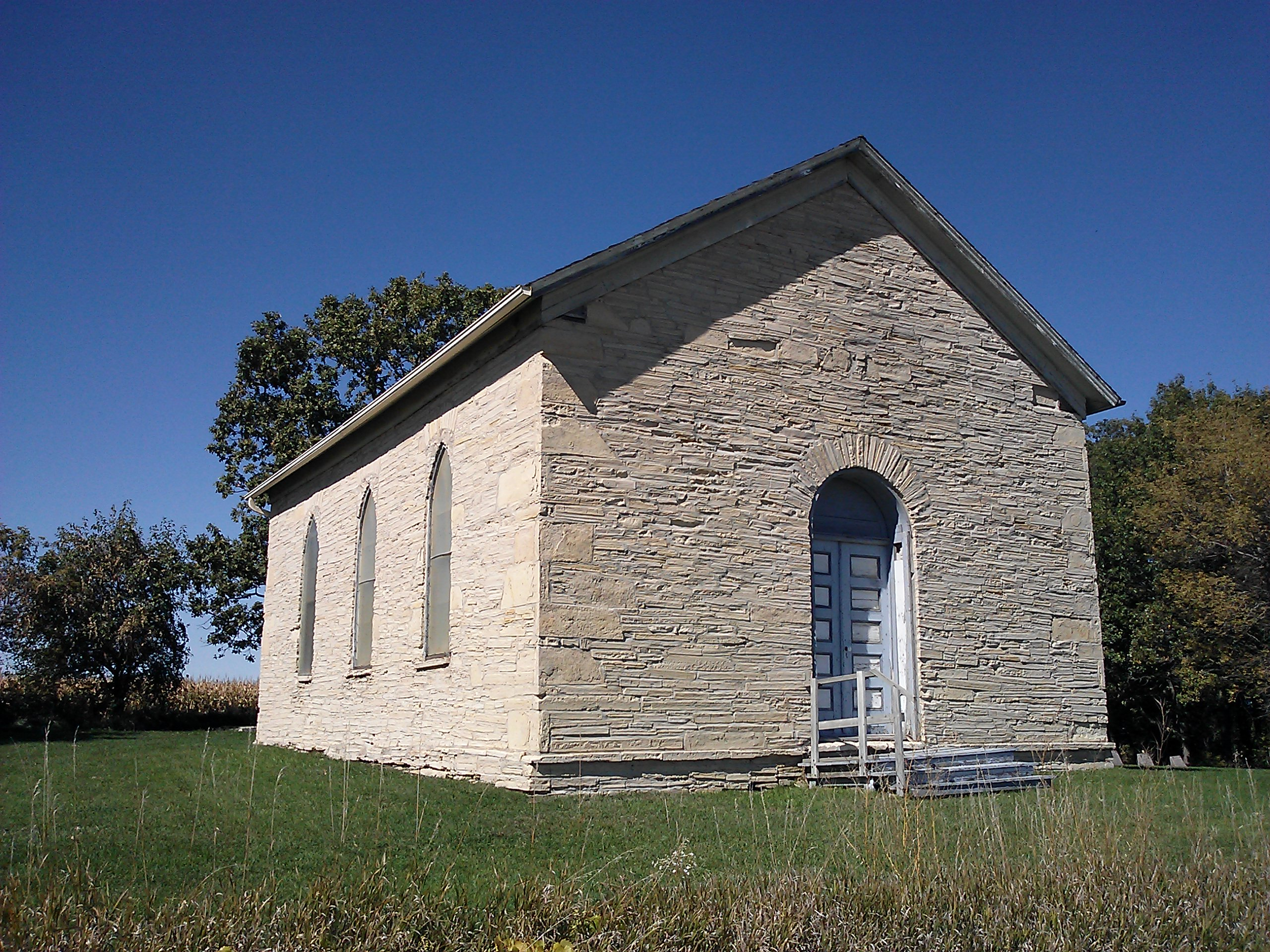

- Location within Iowa Location within the United States
- Location: Southeast of Decorah
- Coordinates: 43°14′09″N 91°44′37″W
- Area: 1.3 acres (0.53 ha)
- Built: 1863-1868
- Built by: WA. Prairie Methodist congregation
- NRHP reference No.: 80001463
- Added to NRHP: January 29, 1980

Washington Prairie Methodist Church is a historic church building located southeast of Decorah, Iowa, United States. The congregation was established by Ole Peter Petersen. He returned to his native Norway in 1853 and founded the first Methodist congregation there. Washington Prairie Methodist is considered the mother church of Methodism in Norway. In the early years the congregation met in private houses. They built this church building themselves from 1863 to 1868. With its pediments and entablature/cornice it is Greek Revival in style. However, the windows on the side elevations are Gothic. It also features a round-arch entry on its gabled end. By 1888 services were only held here quarterly, and continued until about 1920, when the church was officially closed. Over the years some vandalism and settling of the structure occurred. The Vesterheim Norwegian-American Museum in Decorah restored the church and adjacent cemetery in 1972. The bishop of the North European Methodist Conference participated in its re-dedication later that year. It was listed on the National Register of Historic Places in 1980.
