= Winneshiek County Courthouse =

- U.S. Historic district – Contributing property
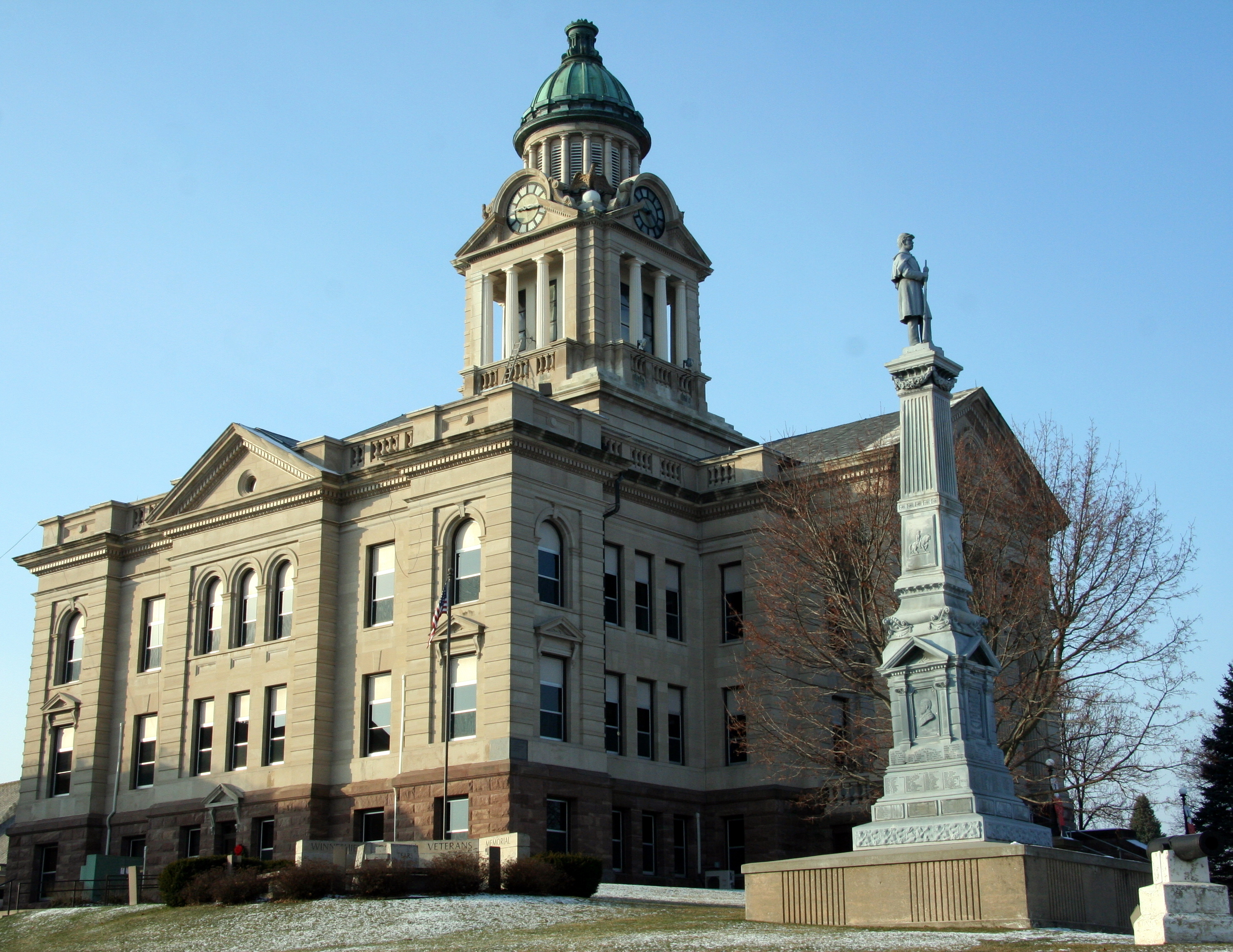

- Location within Iowa Location within the United States
- Location: 204 W. Broadway St. Decorah, Iowa
- Coordinates: 43°18′10.61″N 91°47′16.13″W
- Area: less than one acre
- Built: 1903-1904
- Built by: O.H. Olson
- Architect: A.C. Kinney
- Architectural style: Neoclassical
- Part of: Broadway-Phelps Park Historic District (ID76000813)
- Added to NRHP: November 13, 1976

The Winneshiek County Courthouse is located in Decorah, Iowa, United States. It is the second building used for court functions in Winneshiek County. The courthouse was included as a contributing property in the Broadway-Phelps Park Historic District in 1976.

== History ==
The first courthouse for Winneshiek County was a two-story building completed in 1858 for $18,000. The sheriff's residence and jail were located in the stone basement, offices were located on the first floor, and the courtroom occupied the second floor.

The movement to replace the courthouse began about 1890, but there was not enough citizen support until 1902. To pass the referendum the county Board of Supervisors asked for approval to spend $75,000, even though they knew it would cost more. After construction of the present courthouse was underway they asked for an additional $50,000, which was nearly defeated because of resentment over the way the situation was handled. The cornerstone was laid in 1903 and the building was completed in 1904.

== Architecture ==
A.C. Kinney of the Minneapolis architectural firm of Kinney & Detweiler designed the Neoclassical structure. It was built by O.H. Olson. The three-story structure is composed of Bedford stone on the upper floors and Marquette rain drop stone on the foundation level. The roof is slate and the dome is covered in copper. Stone carvings are located above the entrances.
