= Norris Miller House =

Historic house in Iowa, United States

- U.S. National Register of Historic Places
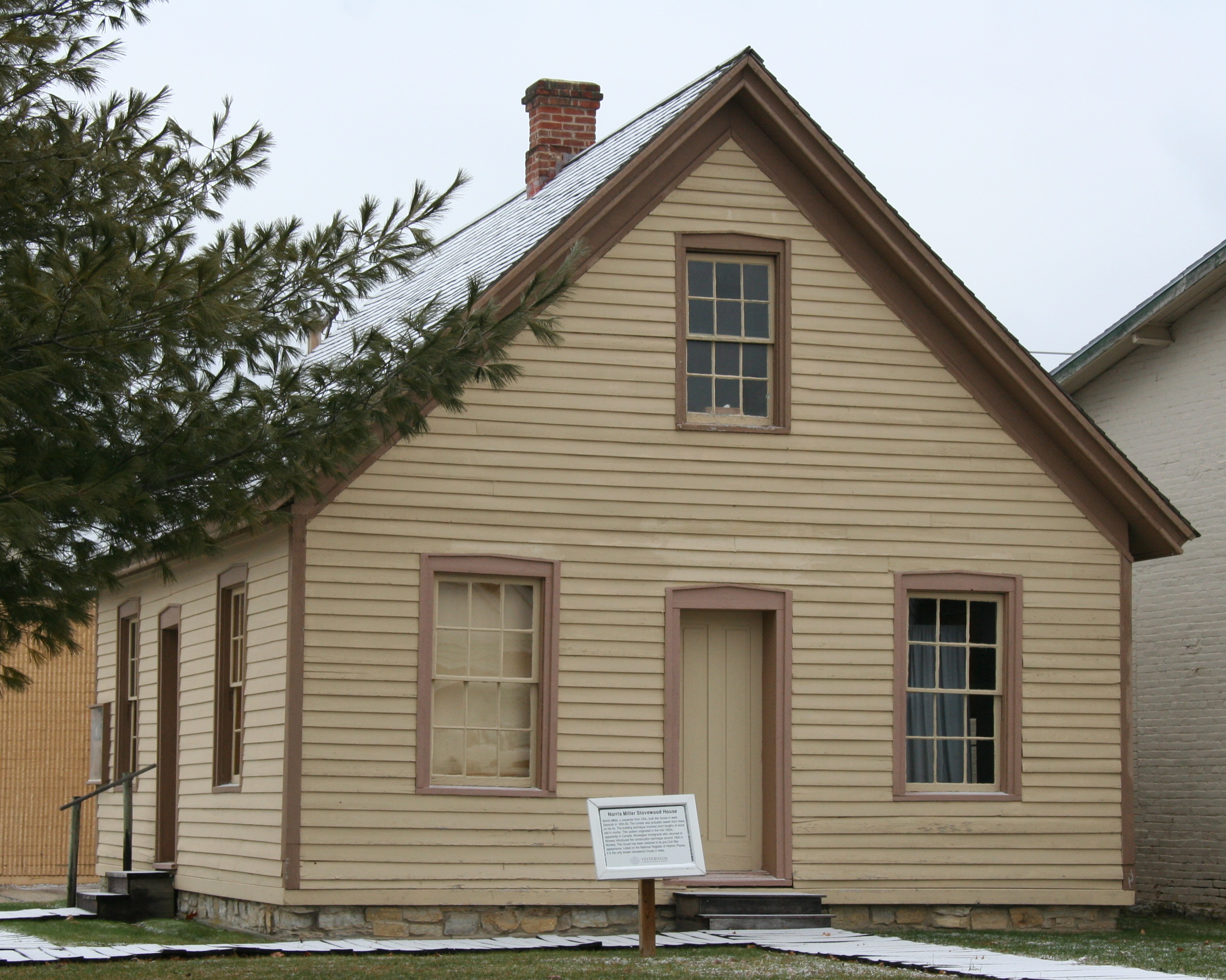

- Location within Iowa Location within the United States
- Interactive map showing the location of Norris-Miller House
- Location: 118 N. Mill St. Decorah, Iowa
- Coordinates: 43°18′19″N 91°47′31″W
- Built: 1856
- Built by: Norris Miller
- NRHP reference No.: 76000814
- Added to NRHP: June 8, 1976

The Norris Miller House, also known as The Stovewood House, is a historic residence located in Decorah, Iowa, United States. The 1½-story frame house features a vernacular Classical cornice, symmetrical plan, a gable roof, and a limestone basement. The structure is composed of oak that is split into short lengths for use in a stove, or stovewood. It is laid with mortar made up of ash and lime. There are only two other houses like this one known to exist in the United States, and both are in Wisconsin.

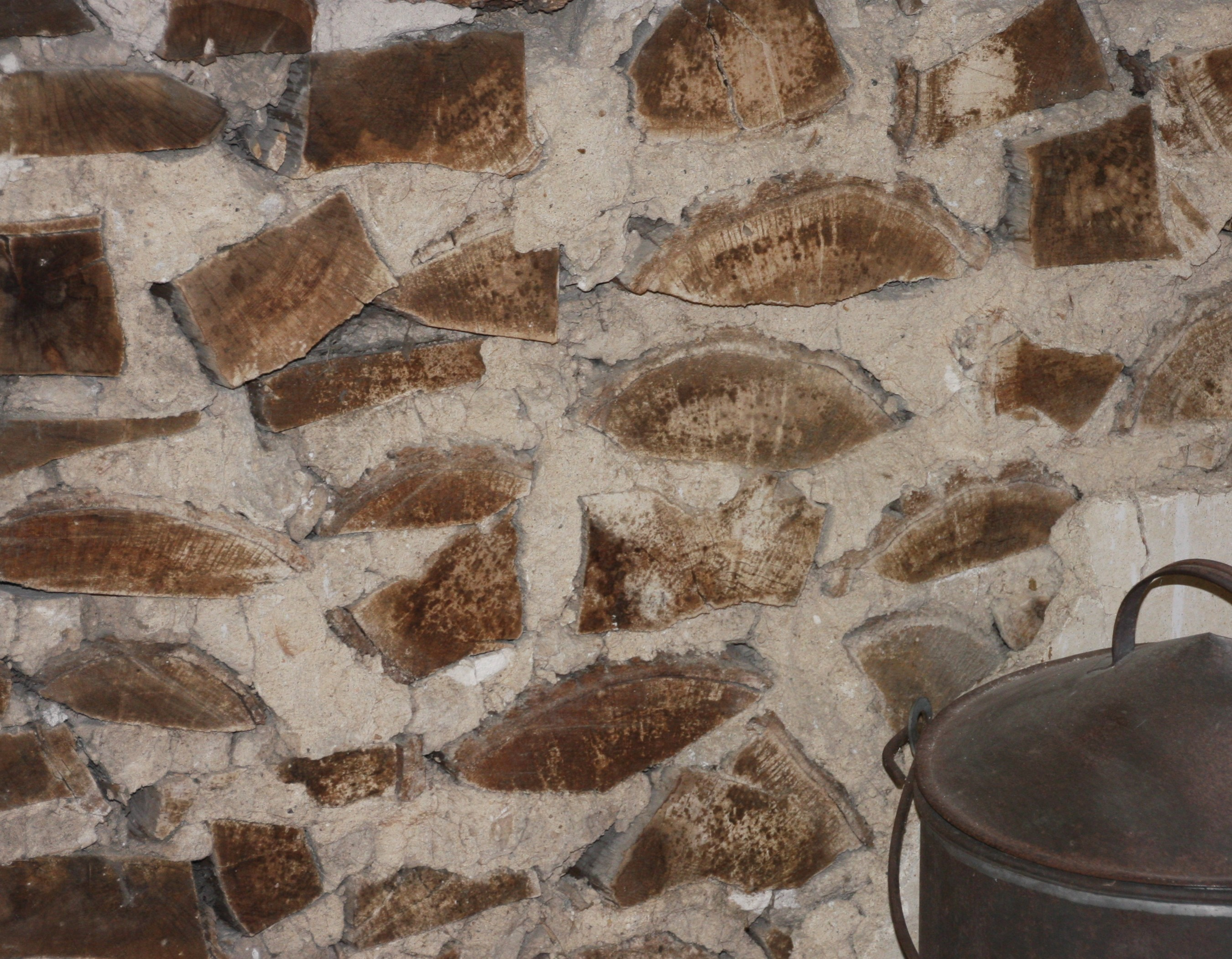
A section interior wall with the plaster removed to show the unusual use of stovewood as insulation

Decorah had two other houses similar to this one, but they have been torn down. All them could have been built by Norris Miller, who settled in Decorah from Ohio in 1855. That year he bought a town lot, and completed this house in 1856. The house was moved to the Vesterheim Norwegian-American Museum in 1976 in order to preserve it. They restored the house and made part of it exhibit. It was listed on the National Register of Historic Places the same year it was moved.
