= Upper Bluffton Bridge =

- U.S. National Register of Historic Places
- Location within Iowa Location within the United States
- Location: Ravine Road over the Upper Iowa River; Bluffton, Iowa
- Coordinates: 43°24′18″N 91°54′54″W
- Built: 1880
- Architect: Wrought Iron Bridge Company
- Architectural style: Pratt through truss
- MPS: Highway Bridges of Iowa MPS
- NRHP reference No.: 98000458
- Added to NRHP: May 15, 1998

The Upper Bluffton Bridge was a historic structure located in Bluffton, Iowa, United States. It spanned the Upper Iowa River for 154 feet (47 m). This bridge was designed, fabricated and built by the Wrought Iron Bridge Company of Canton, Ohio for $2,831.23. This and the Lawrence Bridge were built at the same time, and it marked the first time that Winneshiek County had longer-span trusses built at rural river crossings instead of the smaller bowstring truss bridges. This bridge was listed on the National Register of Historic Places in 1998. It was closed to traffic because of structural problems, and replaced in 2011. Plans at that time were to move the structure to the Millgrove Access Wildlife Area in Poweshiek County, Iowa. However, the move was not made and the structure was replaced with some parts of the original structure being repurposed on a bridge on the Trout Run Bike Trail around Decorah. A plaque was placed adjacent to the new structure in Bluffton commemorating the original structure.
