= Frankville, Iowa =

- Unincorporated community
- Frankville School in 2021

- Location within the state of Iowa Frankville, Iowa (the United States)
- Coordinates: 43°11′21″N 91°37′02″W
- Country: United States
- State: Iowa
- County: Winneshiek
- Elevation: 1,227 ft (374 m)
- Time zone: UTC-6 (Central (CST))
  - Summer (DST): UTC-5 (CDT)
- GNIS feature ID: 456746

Frankville is an unincorporated community in southeastern Winneshiek County, Iowa, United States.

== History ==
The village of Frankville was named after Francis Teabout, who settled here in 1851. The state road was built through the village, and it led to the early economic success of the community. In its early years it had a saw mill, grist mill, a hotel, and a Presbyterian Church. However, the Milwaukee and St. Paul Railroad chose a route to the south of the village, which limited its economic growth. The Frankville School was constructed in 1872 and remained in operation until 1962, after which it became a museum. It was listed on the National Register of Historic Places in 1978.

The population was 85 in 1940.
