= Luther College Farm =

- U.S. National Register of Historic Places
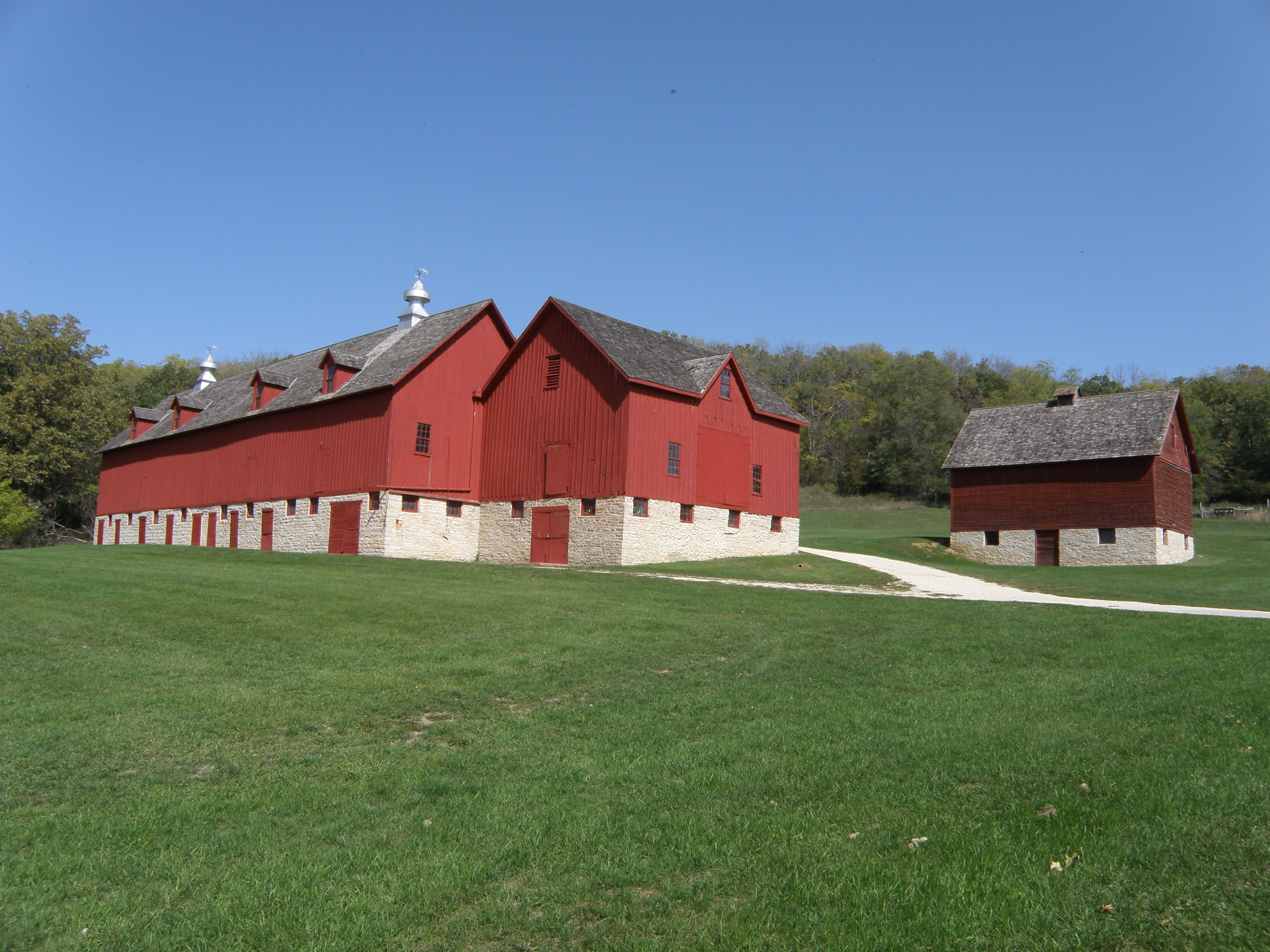

- Location within Iowa Location within the United States
- Location: Luther College campus, Decorah, Iowa
- Coordinates: 43°19′4″N 91°48′5″W
- Area: 5 acres (2.0 ha)
- Built: 1868
- NRHP reference No.: 79000949
- Added to NRHP: July 17, 1979

The Luther College Farm was built between the late 1860s and about 1900 on a hill overlooking Luther College near Decorah, Iowa, United States. The farm comprises a complete ensemble of agricultural buildings, dominated by the farm's barns.

== History ==
The farm was established by Captain A.J. Ashmore, a member of a group of about 30 English immigrant families of Winneshiek County known as the English Colony, who had settled in the area between 1867 and 1885. Ashmore built the farmhouse and other buildings before selling the farm in 1874 to move to West Decorah. The farmhouse is one of the few surviving structures associated with the English Colony. The farm was purchased by Jacob Jewell, a farmer of Norwegian descent, who worked the farm with his son Frank, selling much of the farm's produce to Luther College. The college bought the farm in 1929.

== Description ==
The farm complex comprises the farmhouse, two barns, a corncrib, an icehouse, a slaughterhouse and several additional outbuildings. The barns are the dominant features of the farm. The larger barn was built in two sections on a limestone foundation, with two levels. The wood frame is laid out in ten bays, with a three-section lower level. The small barn adjoins the larger barn at a right angle and is about half as large as the first barn, with three bays. The lower level is fitted for horse stabling. A door in this level communicates with the large barn. The large barn has four small dormers in its pitched shingled roof on the southwest side. Wooden cupolas have been replaced with the present metal ventilators on the ridge. The smaller barn has a prominent gable on the southeast side with decorative cutouts.

The icehouse is a one-story limestone masonry structure with thick walls. It is sectioned into two spaces, arranged so that the interior space could be used for cold storage. The slaughterhouse is a one-story wood-frame structure on a concrete foundation. It features a fireplace that was arranged to receive wood from the exterior of the building. The corncrib is a wood-frame structure on a concrete block foundation, which replaced an earlier stone foundation. The walls are composed of horizontal planking, separated by gaps for ventilation. The brick farmhouse is irregularly arranged in a rough T-shape, with 1 1/2 stories under a steeply-pitching roof with gables and dormers in a variety of configurations. It was remodeled in 1949 and converted to two apartments.

The Luther College Farm was placed on the National Register of Historic Places on July 17, 1979.
