= Decorah Woolen Mill =

- U.S. National Register of Historic Places
- U.S. Historic district – Contributing property
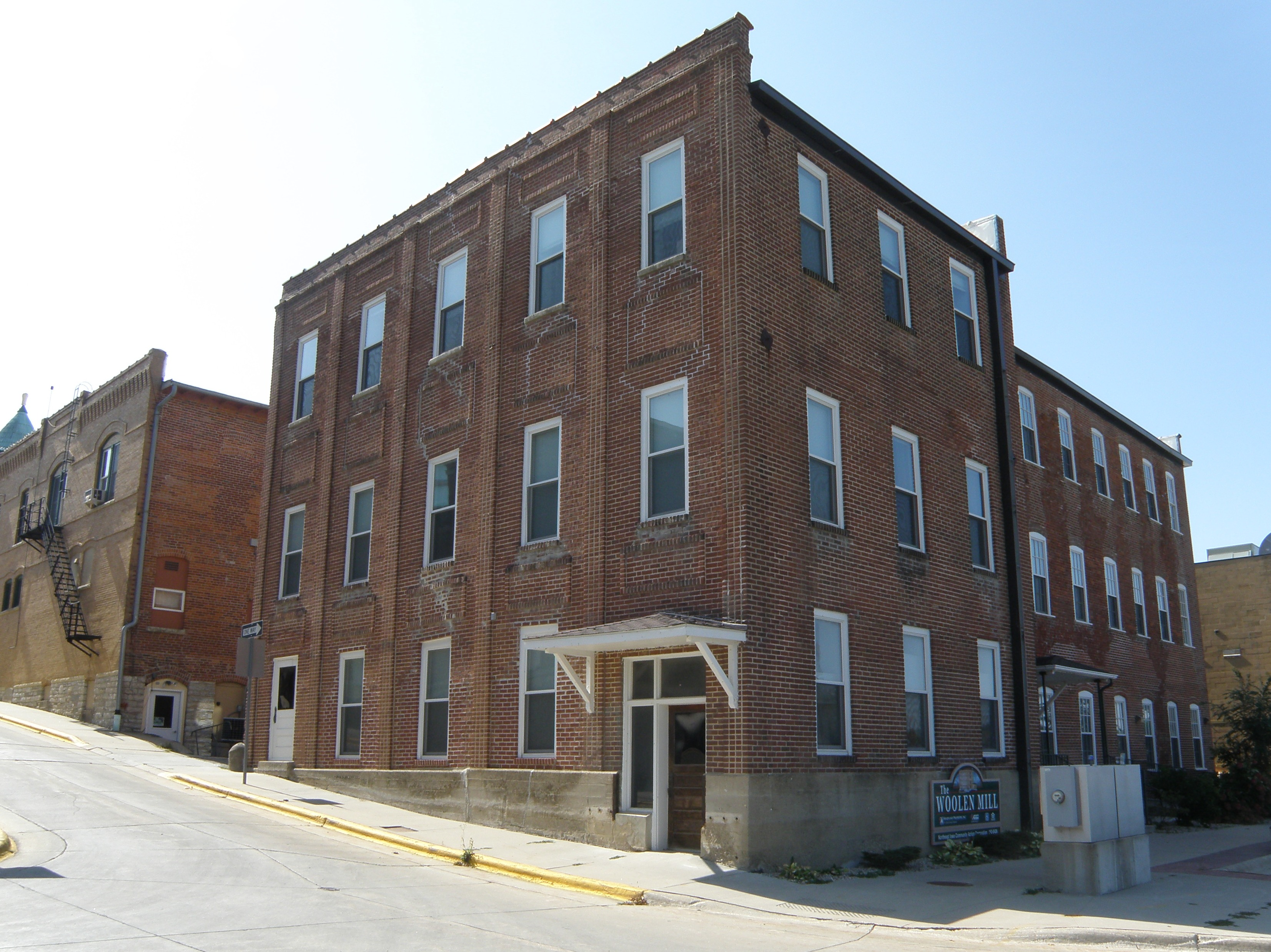

- Location within Iowa Location within the United States
- Location: 107 Court St. Decorah, Iowa
- Coordinates: 43°18′16.5″N 91°47′19″W
- Area: less than one acre
- Built: 1867, 1920
- Part of: Decorah Commercial Historic District (ID76000813)
- NRHP reference No.: 00001681
- Added to NRHP: January 26, 2001

Decorah Woolen Mill, also known as the Meritol Building or Decorah Tire Service, is a historic building located in Decorah, Iowa, United States. The mill was originally constructed in 1867, and was operated by various owners in the years to come. They included the Decorah Glove and Mitten Works who operated in the building the same year, 1908, that it was struck by a tornado. The third floor sustained damage, and they continued operations here. By 1919 they were no longer in business here and the American Drug and Press Association, the Meritol Company, bought the building and expanded it. They made pharmaceuticals and patent medicines, and went bankrupt in 1932. Various other companies operated from here until 1955 when Decorah Tire Service took over. The building was individually listed on the National Register of Historic Places in 2001. The property was developed into a 15-unit apartment building, which opened in 2002. In 2017 it was included as a contributing property in the Decorah Commercial Historic District.

The significance of this building is derived from its association with water-powered manufacturing in Decorah, and wool milling in Iowa and the Midwest in the 19th century. The Upper Iowa River, the source of its water power, flowed by the building until 1949 when the United States Army Corps of Engineers diverted it to the north as a flood prevention measure.
