= Lawrence Bridge =

- U.S. National Register of Historic Places
- Location within Iowa Location within the United States
- Location: 330th Avenue over the Little Turkey River; Jackson Junction, Iowa
- Coordinates: 43°05′45″N 92°03′54″W
- Built: 1880
- Architect: Wrought Iron Bridge Company
- Architectural style: Pratt pony truss
- MPS: Highway Bridges of Iowa MPS
- NRHP reference No.: 98000462
- Added to NRHP: May 15, 1998

The Lawrence Bridge is a historic structure located in Jackson Junction, Iowa, United States. It spans the Little Turkey River for 84 feet (26 m). This bridge was designed, fabricated and built by the Wrought Iron Bridge Company of Canton, Ohio for $2,519.35. This and the Upper Bluffton Bridge were built at the same time, and it marked the first time that Winneshiek County had longer-span trusses built at rural river crossings instead of the smaller bowstring truss bridges. This bridge was listed on the National Register of Historic Places in 1998. It is now privately owned, and located on an abandoned portion of 336th Avenue over the Little Turkey River.
