= Ossian Opera House =

Historic building in Iowa, United States

- U.S. National Register of Historic Places
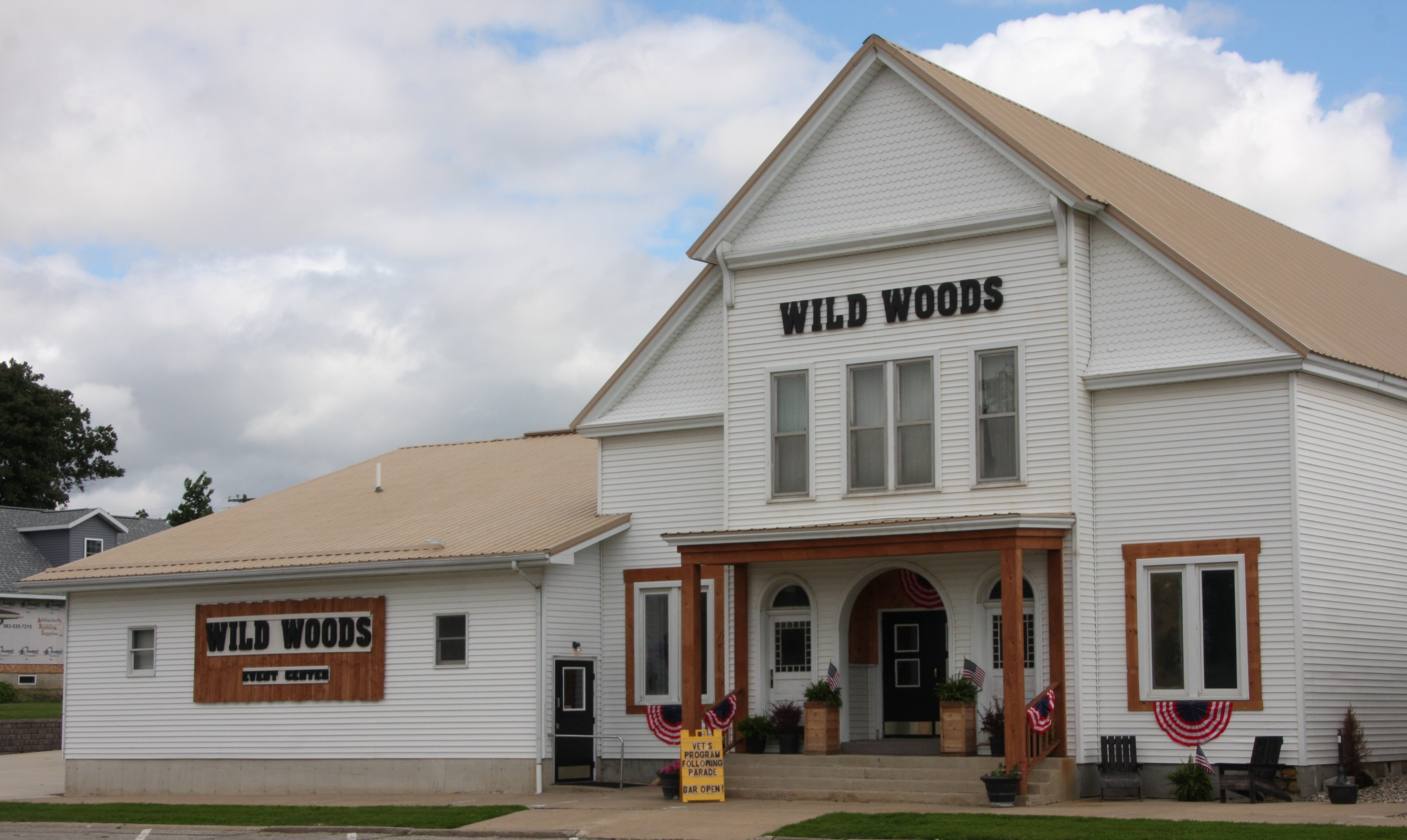
- The building in 2017

- Location within Iowa Location within the United States
- Location: Main Street; Ossian, Iowa
- Coordinates: 43°08′47″N 91°45′56″W
- Built: 1893
- NRHP reference No.: 79000950
- Added to NRHP: June 18, 1979

Ossian Opera House, later known as the Knights of Columbus Hall, then “Wild Woods Event Center” and currently “Christ Our Redeemer Community Church”, is a historic building located in Ossian, Iowa, United States. The opera house "movement" was active in Iowa from about 1870 to 1930. Numerous auditoriums and halls were built in towns large and small. Ossian is somewhat unusual for a small town in that its opera house was a single-use type of building, rather a mixed-use facility. The frame building with a gable roof was built in 1893 by the Ossian Hall Company. It features a three-part facade, with a central frontispiece that is flanked by side wings. The hall could seat 350 people. The local Knights of Columbus council, a Catholic fraternal organization, acquired the building in 1956, and renovated the building for their clubhouse. It was listed on the National Register of Historic Places in 1979.
