= Burr Oak Savings Bank =

- U.S. National Register of Historic Places
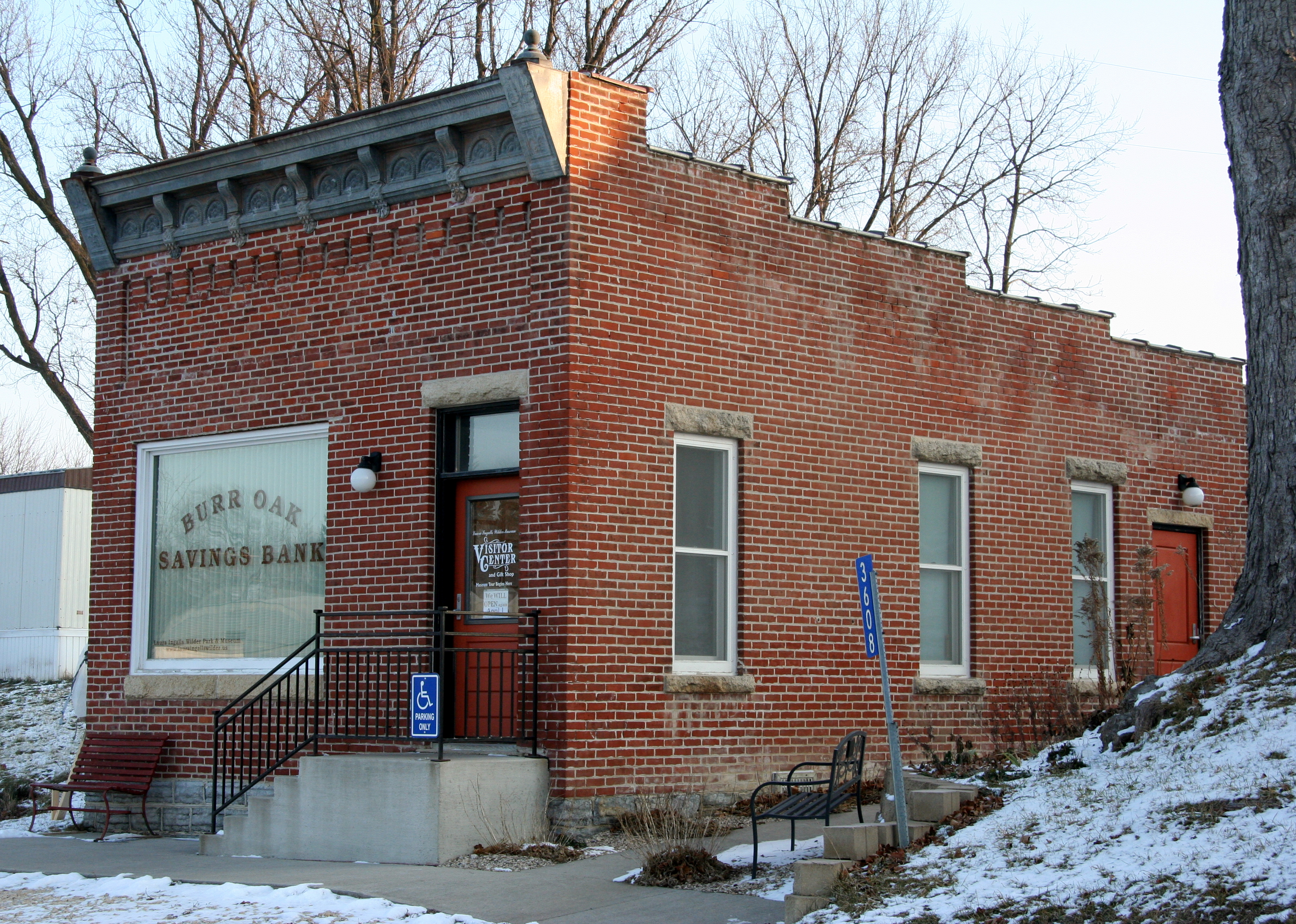
- The former post office in Burr Oak, which is now a bank

- Location within Iowa Location within the United States
- Location: 3608 236th Avenue; Burr Oak, Iowa
- Coordinates: 43°27′29″N 91°51′55″W
- Built: 1910
- Built by: McGee & Riceland
- Architectural style: Italianate
- NRHP reference No.: 01000857
- Added to NRHP: August 8, 2001

Burr Oak Savings Bank – also known as the Burr Oak Post Office – is an historic building located in Burr Oak, Iowa, United States. The free-standing, single-story, brick structure was built in 1910 in the Italianate style. Its primary decorative feature is a panel with corbeled brickwork in a dentil-like pattern, and the bracketed tin cornice above it. In 1931 it suffered a robbery, being the first robbery in Winneshiek County. That same year – as well as in 1941, 1955 and 1967 – the building underwent expansions. After the bank closed, the building was used as a barber shop and the post office, which closed in 1981. In 2014 it became the Visitors Center for the Laura Ingalls Wilder Museum and Park. It is the only building that remains on Burr Oak's main street from a period of economic expansion in early 20th-century Iowa, based on agricultural production and land values. It was listed on the National Register of Historic Places in 2001.
