= Porter House Museum =

Historic house in Iowa, United States

- Ellsworth-Porter House
- U.S. National Register of Historic Places
- U.S. Historic district – Contributing property
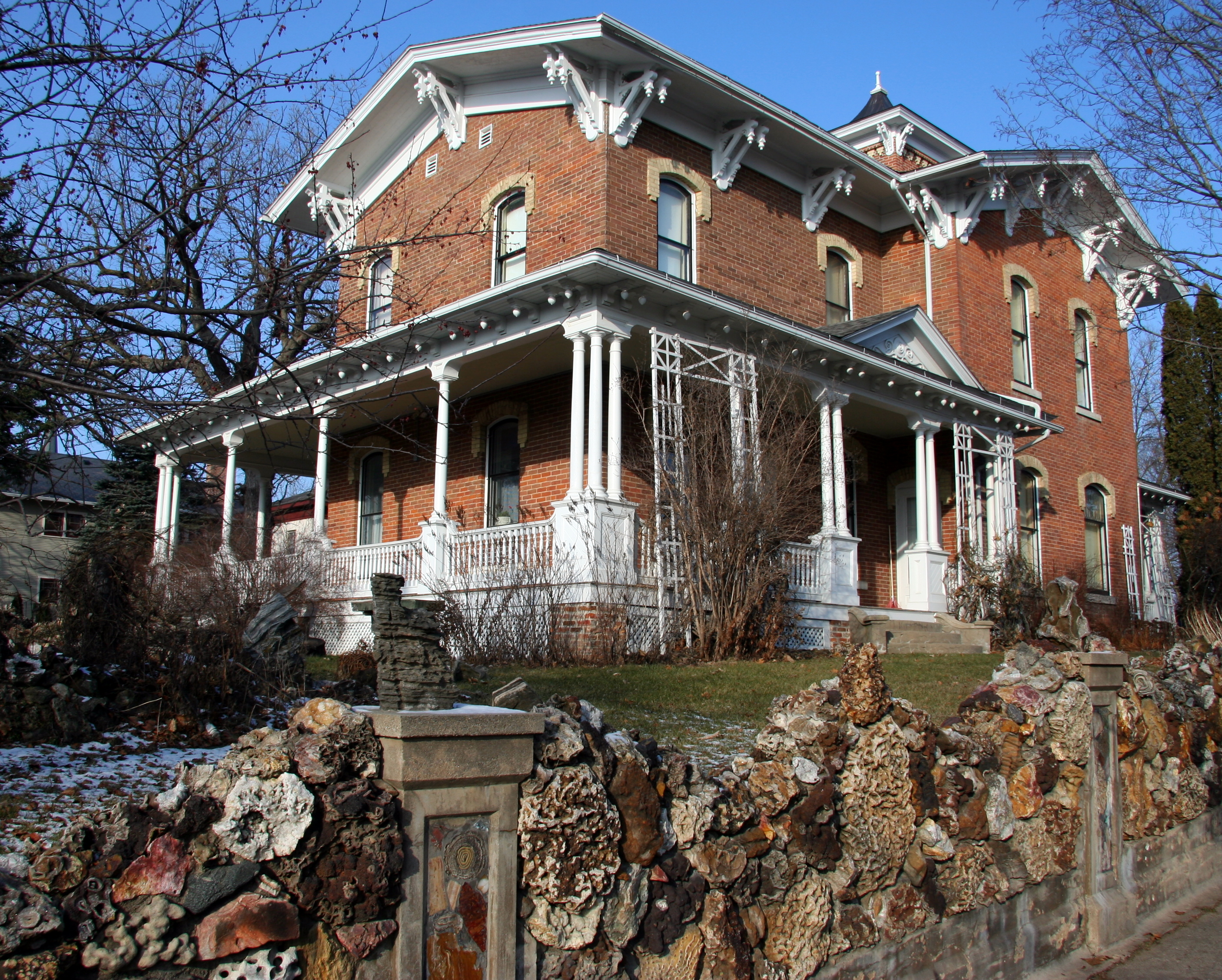
- The Ellsworth-Porter House, home of the Porter House Museum

- Location within Iowa
- Interactive map showing the location of Porter House Museum
- Location: 401 W. Broadway, Decorah, Iowa
- Coordinates: 43°18′08″N 91°47′24″W
- Built: 1867
- Architectural style: Italianate
- Part of: Broadway–Phelps Park Historic District (ID76000813)
- NRHP reference No.: 75000702
- Added to NRHP: August 6, 1975

The Porter House Museum is a house and museum in Decorah, Iowa. It was the home of Adelbert Field Porter (1879–1968) and his wife, Grace Young Porter (1880–1964), as well as Grace's mother and father, until their deaths. On August 6, 1975, the house was added to the National Register of Historic Places (as the Ellsworth-Porter House).

The house is built in the Italianate style and is located at 401 W. Broadway in Decorah. It is within the Broadway–Phelps Park Historic District, also listed in the National Register of Historic Places.

== History ==
The house was built in 1867 for the merchant Dighton B. Ellsworth (1822–1896), an English immigrant who had come to Decorah from New York in 1855. In 1898, after his death, the Ellsworth family sold the house to Francis and Emma Young. In 1904, their daughter Grace married Adelbert Field Porter (known as "Bert"), who was raised in the house across the street on Broadway, the son of George Porter and Adell Field Porter. The Young residence became the home of Bert and Grace, as well as of Francis and Emma Young, until their deaths. Bert and Grace had no children.

== Museum ==
In 1966, Porter deeded the house to the Winneshiek County Historical Society as a site for a museum, and the museum was opened to the public for the first time in 1969. In 1980, it became an independent organization, run by a board of directors.

== Collection ==
Bert and Grace Porter had an interest in travel, and Bert developed a natural history collection on his trips through North America, South America, and Asia. His collection, which includes morpho butterflies from South America, also includes the rock wall surrounding the property (built in part by Bert Porter) and the family's personal effects, including papers, books, furniture, and china.
