= Burr Oak House/Masters Hotel =

- U.S. National Register of Historic Places
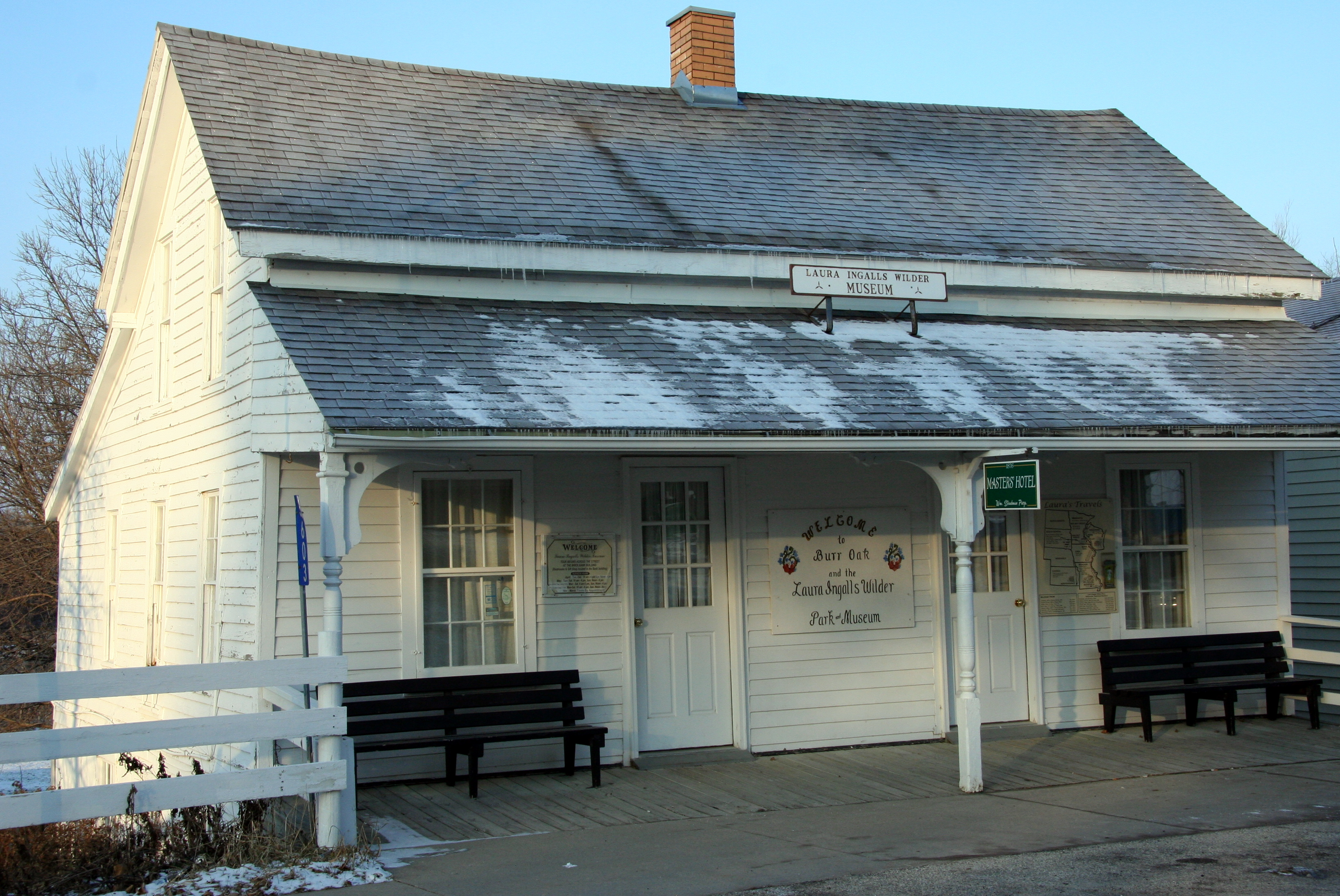

- Location within Iowa Location within the United States
- Location: State Street; Burr Oak, Iowa
- Coordinates: 43°27′27.3″N 91°51′57″W
- Built: 1856
- Built by: Samuel Belding; Wheeler Belding
- NRHP reference No.: 83000410
- Added to NRHP: January 27, 1983

The Burr Oak House/Masters Hotel, also known as the Laura Ingalls Wilder Museum and Park, is a historic building located in Burr Oak, Iowa, United States. The 1½-story frame structure was built in 1856, and features a full-width front porch and a raised basement. Its significance is derived from three elements of its history. First, it is one of the few pre-1860 buildings that was built specifically as a hotel that remains in Iowa. Second, it served as a hotel in a small Iowa town for a significant period of time, enduring changing economic times and tastes. The hotel started as a log structure that was built in 1851, and after this building was built five years later, remained in business until 1878 with different owners and names. At that time it became a dry goods and general store, and served that purpose into the early 1890s when Dr. W.H. Emmons used it as a residence and office. Around 1896 a two-story addition, no longer extant, was built onto the south side and it was made exclusively into a house.

The third significant element of the former hotel is its association with author Laura Ingalls Wilder, who lived here as a child from 1876 to 1877. It is the only known extant building occupied by the Ingalls' family in Burr Oak. Her father Charles ran the hotel, and worked in a saw mill. The family moved into the grocery store next door, before leaving town in 1878. The building was in a dilapidated state when it was bought in 1973 by Laura Ingalls Wilder Park, Inc. They restored the building and turned it into a museum. It was listed on the National Register of Historic Places in 1983.

The Burr Oak Savings Bank, across the street from the hotel, serves as the visitors' center for the museum.
