= Steyer Opera House =

- U.S. National Register of Historic Places
- U.S. Historic district – Contributing property
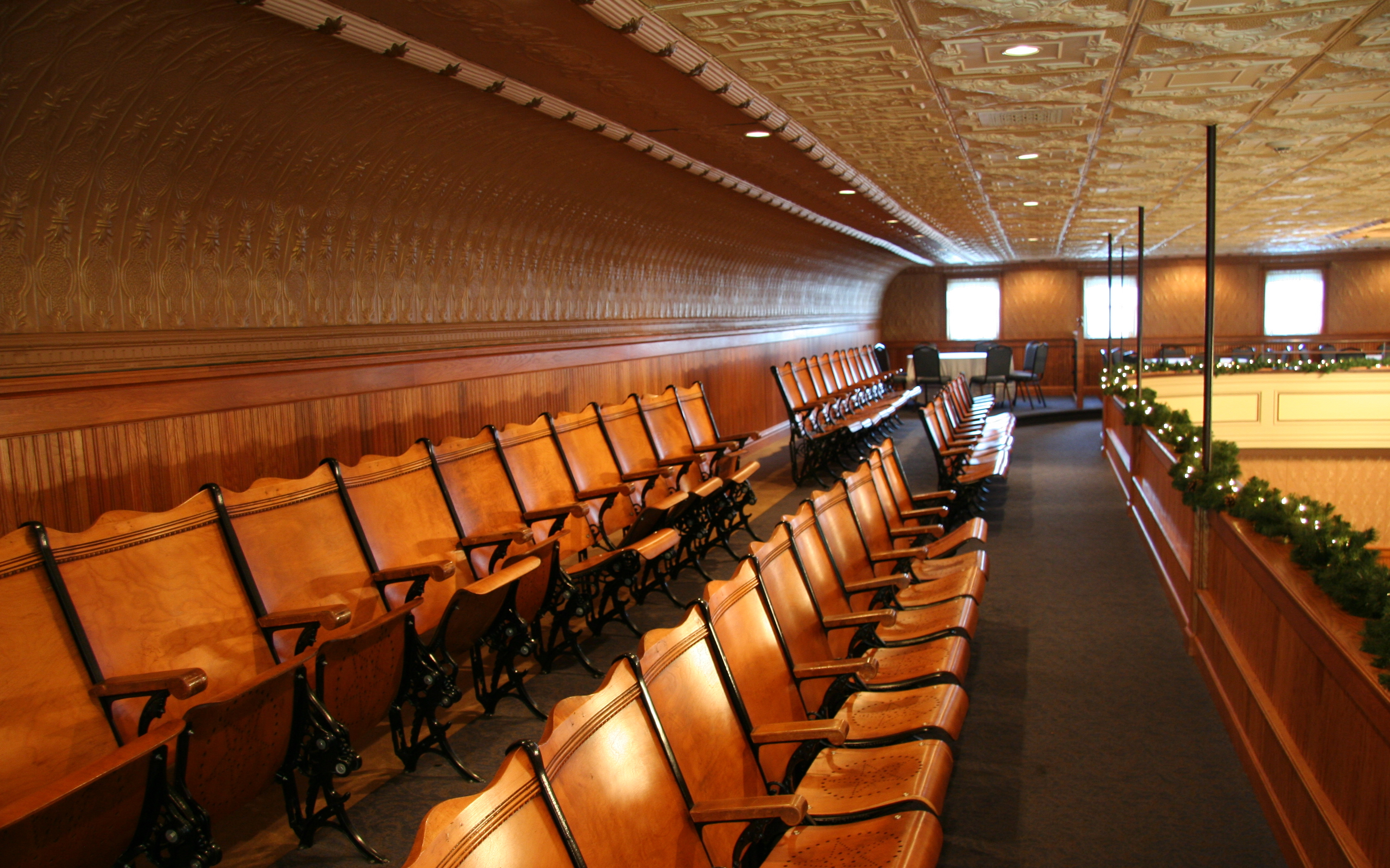
- Steyer Opera House Balcony

- Location within Iowa Location within the United States
- Location: 102-104 West Water Street; Decorah, Iowa
- Coordinates: 43°18′16″N 91°47′10″W
- Area: less than one acre
- Built: 1870, 1875
- Architect: F.G. Brant
- Part of: Decorah Commercial Historic District (ID76000813)
- NRHP reference No.: 80001462
- Added to NRHP: January 24, 1980

Steyer Opera House is a historic building located in Decorah, Iowa, United States. The three-story, brick commercial block was designed by F.G. Brant of Dubuque. Its original owner and namesake was Joseph Steyer, who emigrated from Luxembourg in 1852 and settled in Decorah in 1865. The building was built in 1870 and an additional three bays were added to the east side in 1875. The first floor houses retail space, the second floor historically housed apartments, and the auditorium is on the third floor. The walls and ceiling are covered with tin that is pressed in a variety of decorative patterns. Doorways flank the proscenium. They are framed by paneled pilasters and capped with a broad architrave. The balcony that rings the main floor on three sides of the auditorium was part of the 1875 renovation of the building. It is now part of the neighboring Hotel Winneshiek. The building was individually listed on the National Register of Historic Places in 1980. In 2017 it was included as a contributing property in the Decorah Commercial Historic District.
