= Locust School =

- U.S. National Register of Historic Places
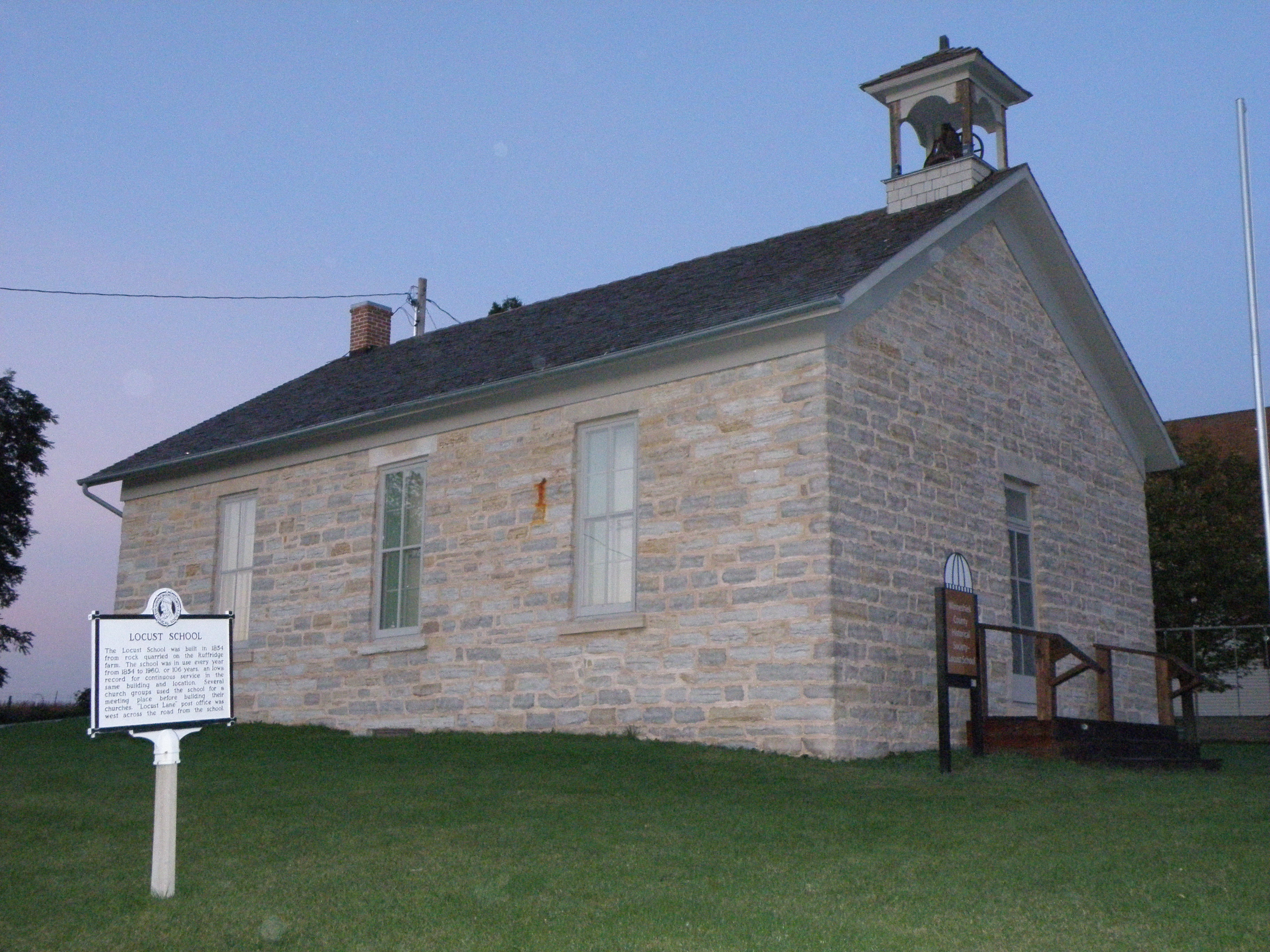

- Location within Iowa Location within the United States
- Location: North of Decorah
- Coordinates: 43°25′19″N 91°43′19″W
- Built: 1854
- NRHP reference No.: 78001270
- Added to NRHP: May 22, 1978

Locust School is a historic building located north of Decorah, Iowa, United States. Built in 1854, the one-room schoolhouse is composed of rubble ashlar limestone and capped with a gable roof. The lintels and window sills are also stone. A belfry with round-arch openings is located above the main entrance. The school was established just after the village of Locust was surveyed and settlement had begun. It remained in operation with all elementary grades until 1950, when it was reduced to specific grades. It was closed in 1960. The Winneshiek County Historical Society acquired the building and operates a museum in it. It was one of the first school buildings constructed in Winneshiek County. The building was listed on the National Register of Historic Places in 1978.
