= Cooley-Whitney House =

Historic house in Iowa, United States

- U.S. National Register of Historic Places
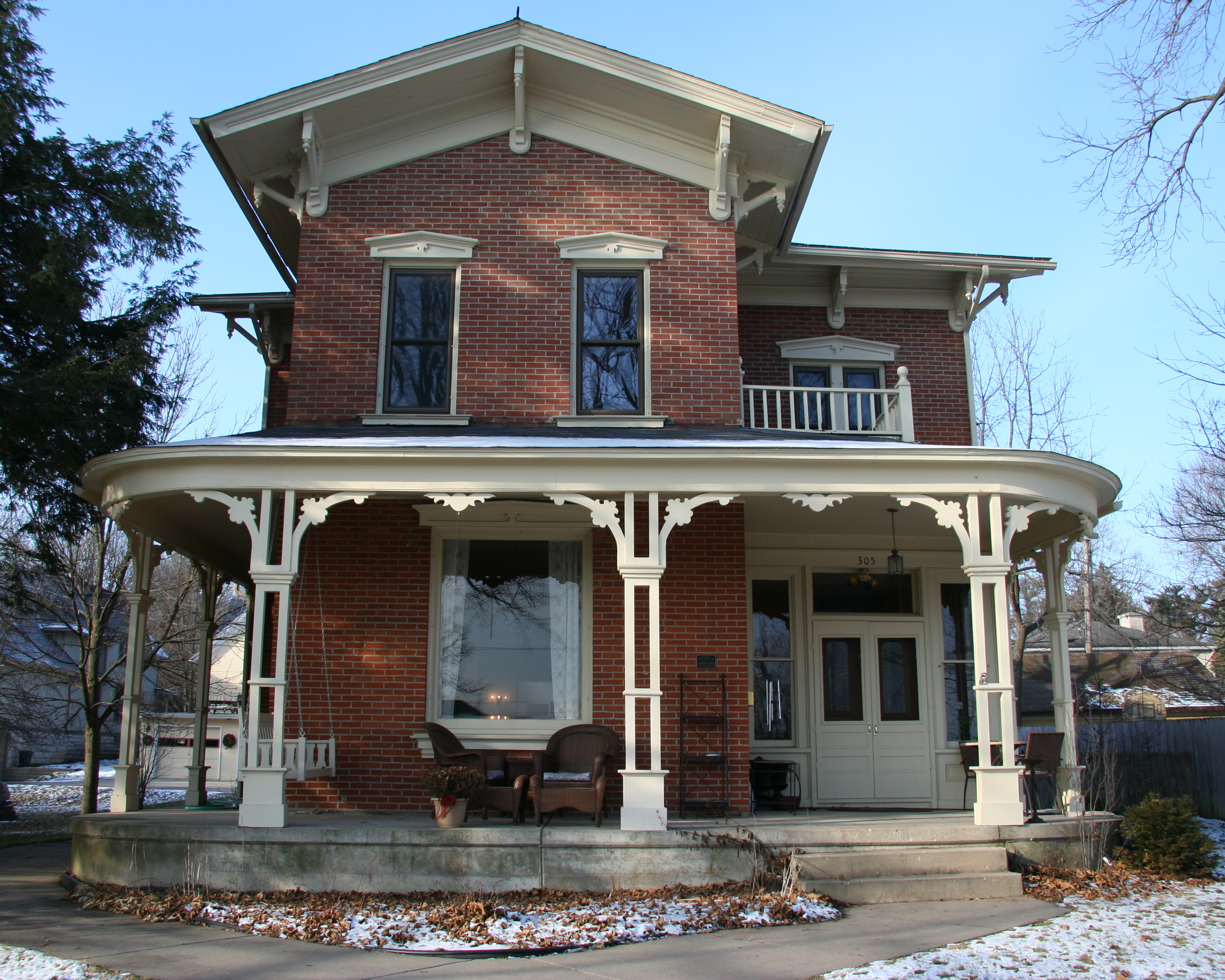

- Location within Iowa Location within the United States
- Location: 305 Grove St., Decorah, Iowa
- Coordinates: 43°18′08″N 91°46′02″W
- Built: 1867
- Built by: Wilson, Robertson & Co.
- Architect: H.O. Ball
- Architectural style: Italianate; Classical Revival
- NRHP reference No.: 80001461
- Added to NRHP: January 25, 1980

The Cooley-Whitney House (also known as the Whitney House) is a historic house located on Grove Street in Decorah, Iowa, United States.

== Description and history ==
The significance of this house is its architectural combination of the Italianate and Neoclassical styles, and its association with two prominent Decorah bankers. It was designed by local architect H. O. Ball, and built in 1867 by Wilson, Robertson & Company, a local contractor. The two-story, brick house features bracketed eaves, a wooden cornice, and a wrap-around bracketed porch. It was built for E. E. Cooley, an attorney who helped establish the First National Bank of Decorah. He was also involved with local politics. After his death in 1895, the house became the home of Lewis B. Whitney. He was the former Winneshiek County Treasurer who was one of the organizers of the National Bank of Decorah.

The house was listed on the National Register of Historic Places on January 25, 1980. It has been converted into a bed and breakfast.
