= Painter-Bernatz Mill =

- U.S. National Register of Historic Places
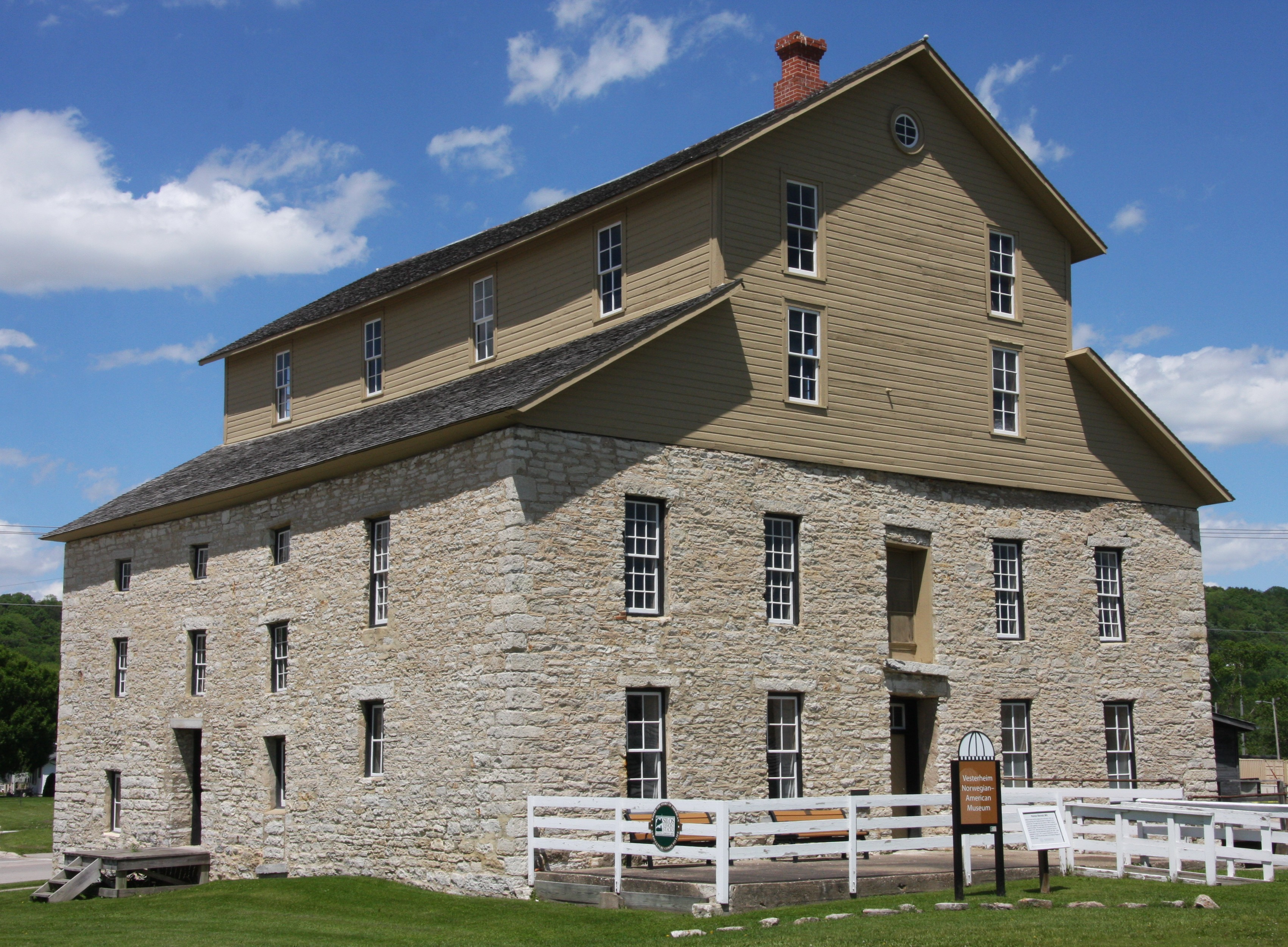
- The mill in 2017

- Location within Iowa Location within the United States
- Location: 200 N. Mill St. Decorah, Iowa
- Coordinates: 43°18′21″N 91°47′32″W
- Built: 1851
- Built by: William Painter
- NRHP reference No.: 74000816
- Added to NRHP: January 11, 1974

Painter-Bernatz Mill, also known as the Old Stone Mill, is a historic building located in Decorah, Iowa, United States. The original part of the mill was constructed by William Painter in 1851, and it was expanded to its present size in the next year or two. A mill race was constructed from a dam on the Upper Iowa River, and it was routed beneath the building to power the turbine. It was the first of at least 15 mills that used this river as its source of power. The lower two floors are composed of native limestone. The original hip roof was removed sometime between 1874 and 1890 and the present gable roof was built giving the mill a large loft. Diesel power replaced water power in 1947. The building continued to operate as a mill until 1964. It became a part of the Vesterheim Norwegian-American Museum in 1971, and houses exhibits on agriculture and industry. It is also a site in the Silos & Smokestacks National Heritage Area. The former mill is the oldest building in Decorah. It was listed on the National Register of Historic Places in 1974.
