= Frankville School =

- U.S. National Register of Historic Places
- The building in 2021

- Location within Iowa Location within the United States
- Location: State Street; Frankville, Iowa
- Coordinates: 43°11′28″N 91°37′18″W
- Built: 1872
- Built by: W.H. Hopper
- NRHP reference No.: 78001272
- Added to NRHP: November 14, 1978

Frankville School, also known as the Frankville Museum, is a historic structure located in the unincorporated community of Frankville, Iowa, United States. It was built in 1872 by W.H. Hopper, replacing an older building from the mid-1850s. It is a two-story, stone vernacular structure, capped with a gable roof. The stone is rock-faced ashlar limestone. The stones on the front facade are carefully dressed compared with those on the other elevations. The lintels and window sills are blocks of rock-faced stone, except for those on the front. On the front, carefully dressed stone voussoirs and keystones are used for the round arches for the main entrance and the window above. High school classes were added in the 1920s. In 1958 the school was reduced to kindergarten and 7th and 8th grades. It closed in 1962. The following year the Winneshiek County Historical Society acquired the building and operated a museum in it. It remains in the community's park.

The building's relative uniqueness is derived from its stone construction. The vast majority of Iowa's 19th-century schoolhouses were of frame or log constriction, followed by brick. By 1874 at the peak of schoolhouse construction only 268 were stone, compared to 8,000 frame structures and about 650 that were brick. The building was listed on the National Register of Historic Places in 1978.
