= Broadway–Phelps Park Historic District =

Historic district in Iowa, United States

- U.S. National Register of Historic Places
- U.S. Historic district
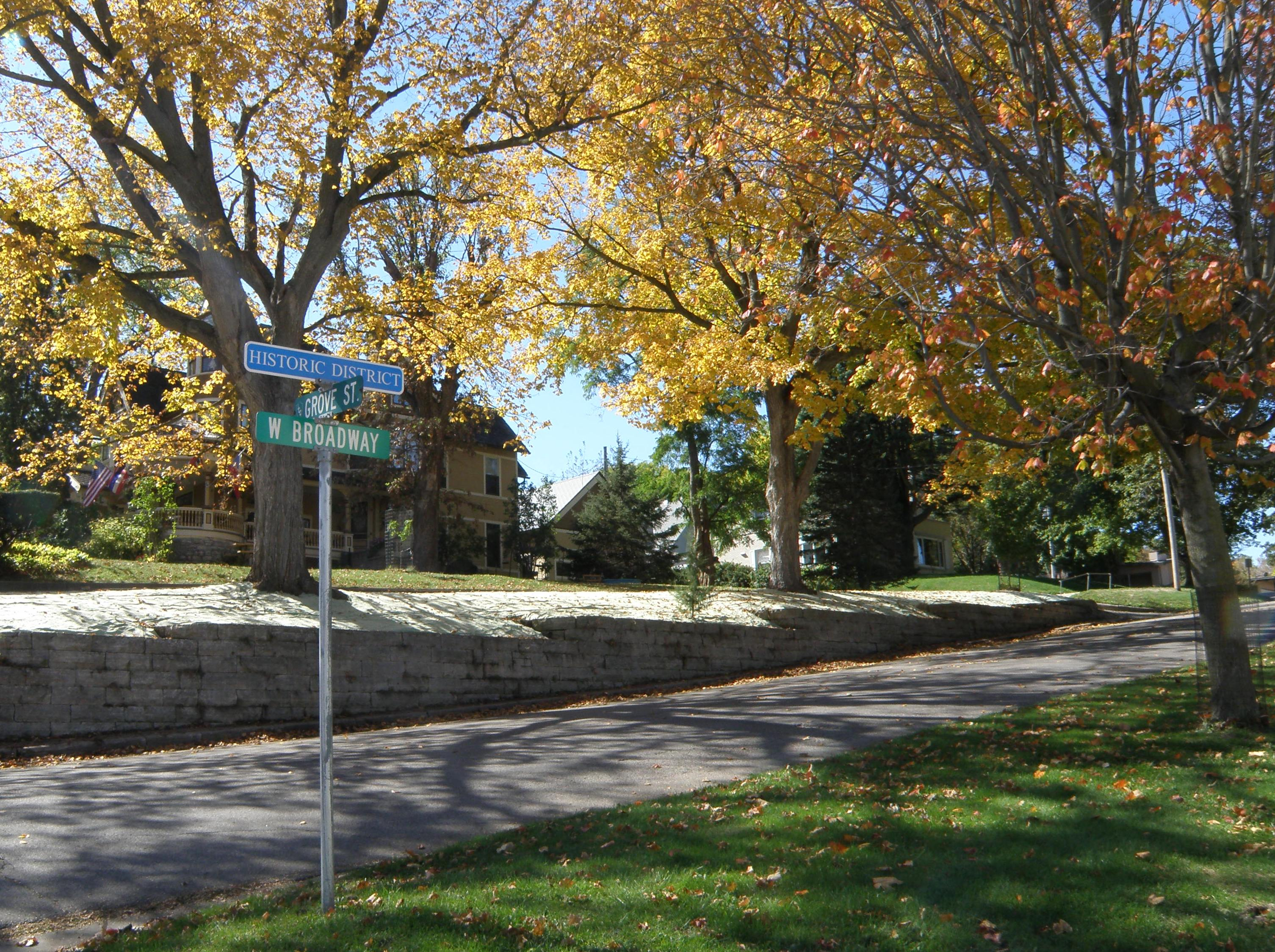

- Location within Iowa Location within the United States
- Location: West Broadway from Winnebago Street to Park Drive, 202 Winnebago St., 307 West Main St. Decorah, Iowa
- Coordinates: 43°18′01″N 91°47′35″W
- Area: approximately 40 acres (16 ha)
- Architectural style: Late 19th and 20th century revivals Late Victorian
- NRHP reference No.: 76000813 (original); 100007492 (increase)

Significant dates
- Added to NRHP: November 13, 1976
- Boundary increase: March 14, 2022

The Broadway–Phelps Park Historic District is located in Decorah, Iowa, United States. It was listed on the National Register of Historic Places in 1976. The original boundaries of the historic district is composed of seven blocks of a residential area and the city's oldest park. It is located on a prominent hill in the heart of Decorah. Contributing properties include five churches, three government buildings (including the Winneshiek County Courthouse), a museum, brick kiln, a carriage house, and 36 private residences. Contributing sites include the city park square and the river bluff. The historic buildings were built from the 1850s to the early 1900s. Most of the structures are two or more stories, and were built in limestone, sandstone, or brick. The Ellsworth-Porter House is individually listed on the National Register of Historic Places. In 2022, the historic district boundaries were increased to include two more properties.
