= Wenzil Taylor Building =

- U.S. National Register of Historic Places
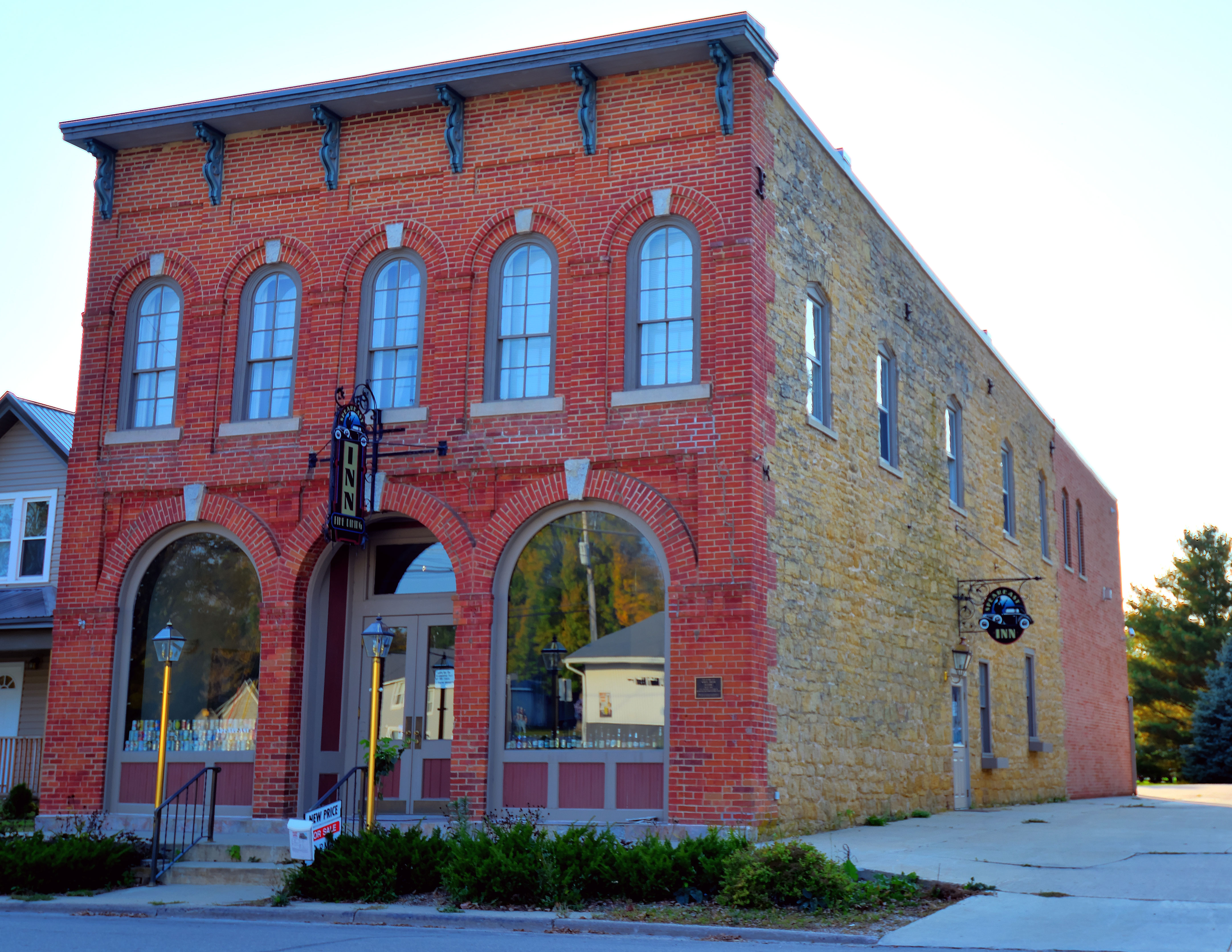

- Location within Iowa Location within the United States
- Location: Main Street; Spillville, Iowa
- Coordinates: 43°12′04″N 91°57′05″W
- Built: 1871
- Architectural style: Italianate
- NRHP reference No.: 79000951
- Added to NRHP: March 21, 1979

The Wenzil Taylor Building is a historic building located in Spillville, Iowa, United States. Wenzil Taylor had this building constructed in 1871 for use as a general merchandise store. It is located in the town's original commercial district, and it is the last remaining commercial structure from that era.

The two-story structure has side and rear walls of rubble limestone with a brick facade. The decorative elements of the Italianate style building features brick arches with dressed limestone keystones, recessed brick panels, and brick pilasters. The bracketed cornice on the top is a recreation added during the building's restoration in the 1980s.

It continued to house a merchandise store for most of its history, and was used as a residence before it was abandoned. The building was listed on the National Register of Historic Places in 1979. After its restoration in the 1980s, it became a restaurant and inn.
