= Vesterheim Norwegian-American Museum =

Museum in Decorah, Iowa

Coordinates: 43.3044°N 91.7920°W

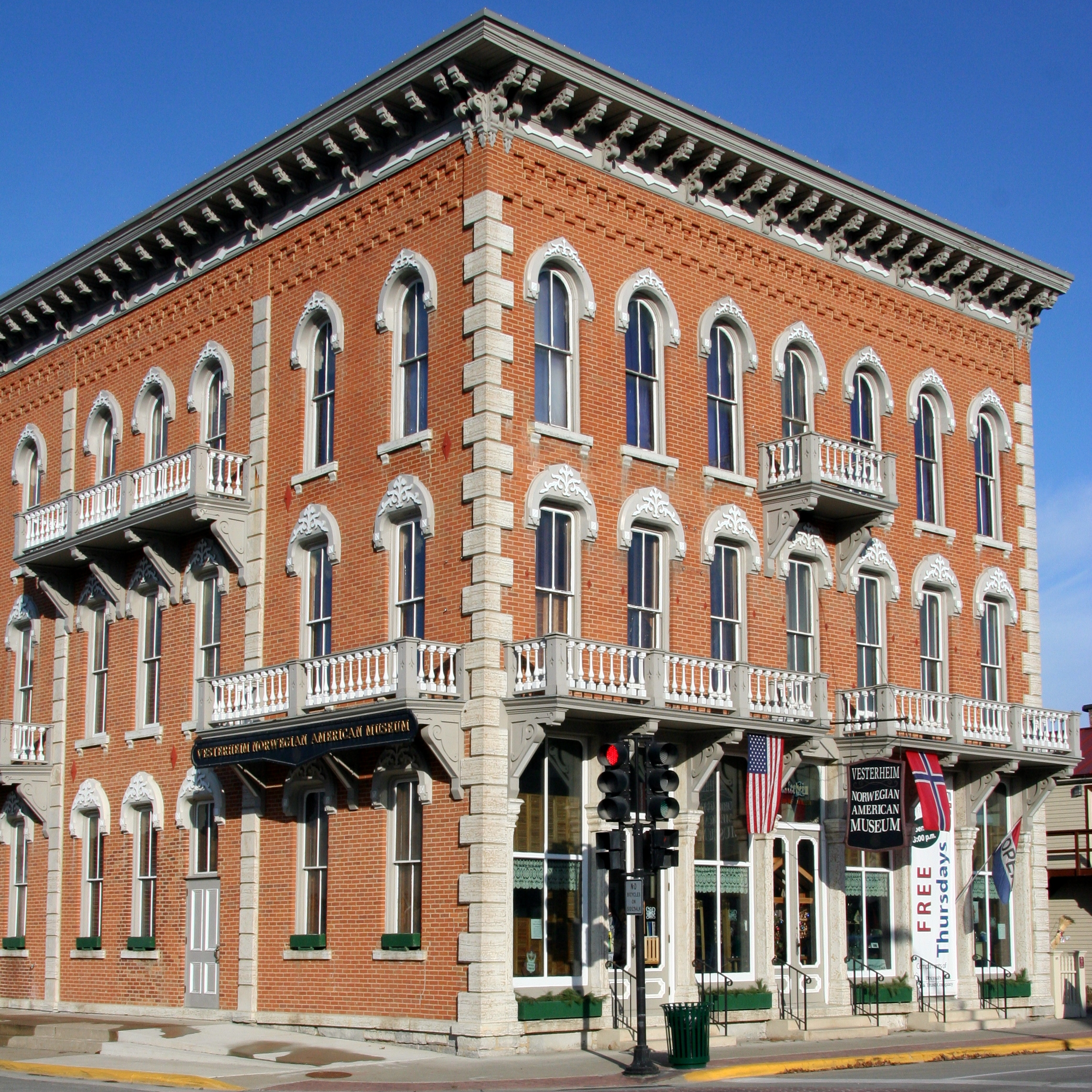
- Location: 502 West Water Street; Decorah, Iowa, United States
- Director: Chris Johnson
- Website: http://vesterheim.org/

Vesterheim Norwegian-American Museum in Decorah, Iowa is the National Norwegian-American Museum and Folk Art School, with over 33,000 artifacts, 12 historic buildings, and a library and archives. This treasure showcases one of the most extensive collection of Norwegian-American artifacts in the world and highlights the best in historic and contemporary Norwegian folk and fine arts. Some of its buildings are on the National Register of Historic Places.

Vesterheim's exhibitions explore the diversity of American immigration through the lens of the Norwegian-American experience, and its classes welcome students to participate in the continual evolution of traditional folk art as it meets new influences. Vesterheim also offers educational events, publications, and lectures related to its mission.

== History ==
Vesterheim Museum was founded in 1877 as the Norwegian-American Historic Museum. It began as a part of nearby Luther College. In 1965, the Norwegian-American Museum became an independent non-profit museum with its own staff and board of directors. Soon after, it was referred to as Vesterheim Norwegian-American Museum. In 1969, Luther loaned the artifacts owned by Luther to the museum. In 1991, the museum acquired legal title to that collection and the museum's name was officially changed to "Vesterheim Norwegian-American Museum." Vesterheim means 'western home' in Norwegian.

The museum's main building is the historic Arlington Hotel/Publishing House. Luther College purchased the abandoned building in 1932 and moved the museum collection to that site in 1933. Luther sold the building to Vesterheim for $1.00 in 1969. In 1973, the museum purchased land on Mill Street behind the main building for the future Heritage Park (initially called the Open Air Division).

The museum's first curator (from 1895 to 1902) was Haldor Hanson, Luther's professor of music. He changed the focus of the museum to an institution dedicated to the everyday life of a Norwegian-American by combining artifacts already acquired by Luther and adding more. Curator from 1911 to 1921, Christian Keyser Preus brought the idea of an "Open Air Division" back to Luther College in 1913 after seeing a collection of buildings at a museum called Maihaugen in Lillehammer, Norway. Four buildings were moved to the Luther College campus between 1921 and 1930. It would become the first of its kind in the United States.

Knut Gjerset was curator from 1922 to 1935. Under his direction, the museum's artifacts increased along with its recognition. In honor of the 1925 centennial of Norwegian immigration, museums in Norway made large donations of artifacts to the museum in Decorah. Maihaugen's curator, Anders Sandvig, was in charge of collecting and shipping the gifts that would fill five semi-tractor trailers when they reached the United States. When the artifacts were on the way, Anders wrote to Knut telling of their journey, "May these objects work so that the Norwegian-ness in you will not die too soon and the connection with the homeland will because of this be tighter. Receive this gift as proof that we follow you all in our hearts even though the big Atlantic Ocean parts us." In 1930, Gjerstet bought 6,000 Norwegian-American artifacts known as the P. D. Peterson Collection from Eau Claire, Wisconsin, and the museums in Norway made another large gift in 1939.

Vesterhem's Folk Art School began in 1967 with two classes - Hardanger embroidery, taught by Carola Schmidt of Decorah, and rosemaling, taught by Sigmund Aarseth from Norway. The folk-art education program grew in 1968 to five classes with 63 students from 12 states, and now offers over 100 classes each year in fiber arts, painting, woodworking, metal working, food traditions, language, and more, both onsite and online. "The National Norwegian-American Folk Art Exhibition" and Gold Medalist program also were born in 1967. This annual exhibition is a collection of art work entered by contemporary artists from all over the country who compete for ribbons in five categories - rosemaling, weaving, woodcarving, knifemaking, and metalworking, and earn points toward a Vesterheim Gold Medal.

== Heritage Park ==
Heritage Park is a collection of 12 historic buildings located behind the museum's main building.

=== Painter-Bernatz Mill ===
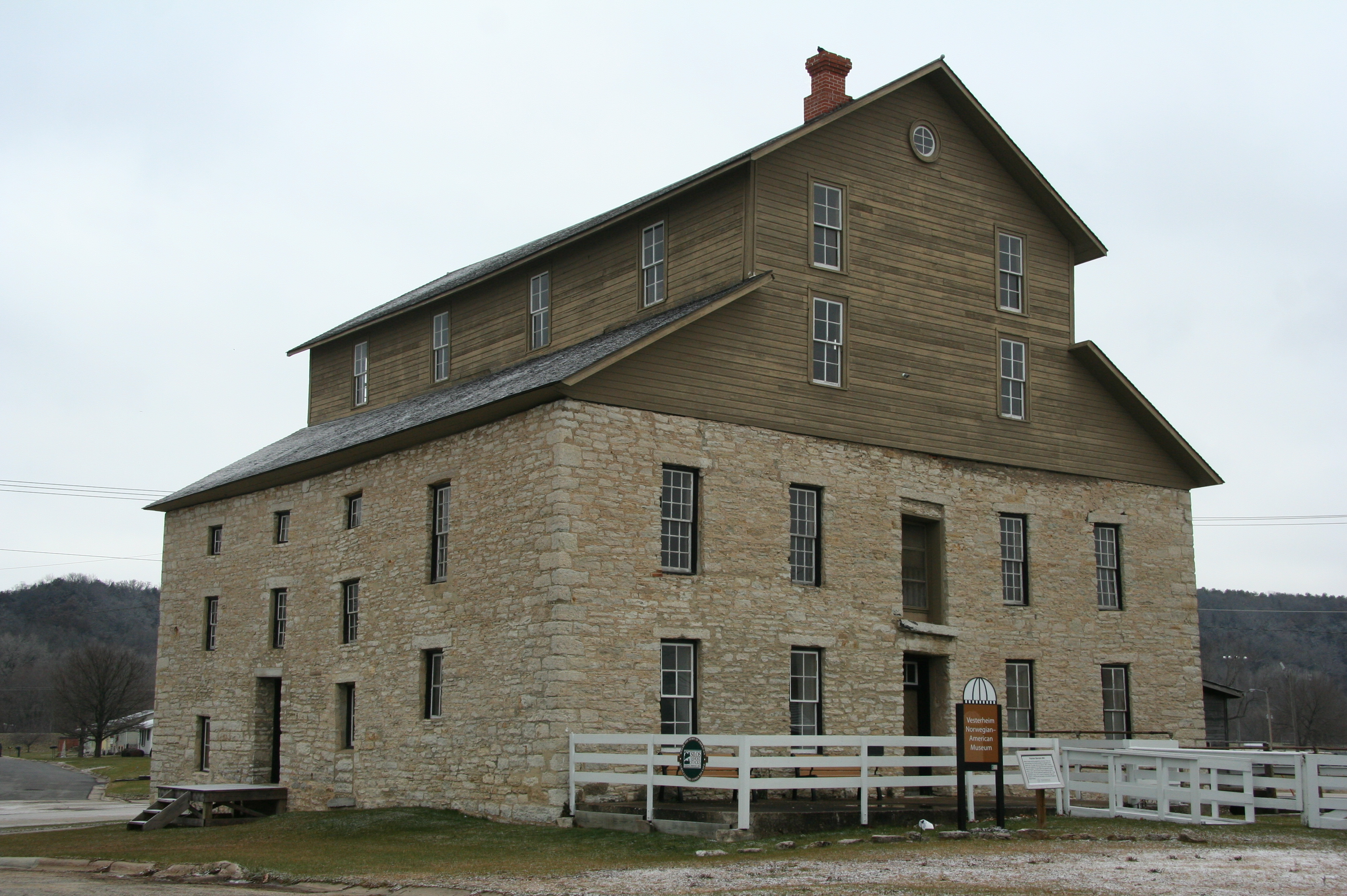
Painter-Bernatz Mill

The Painter-Bernatz Mill is at 200 North Mill Street, in Heritage Park. It was listed on the National Register of Historic Places in 1974. The Old Stone Mill was built by William Painter, one of Winneshiek County's earliest European settlers, in 1851 and is commonly believed to be the oldest building in Decorah.

=== Norris Miller House ===
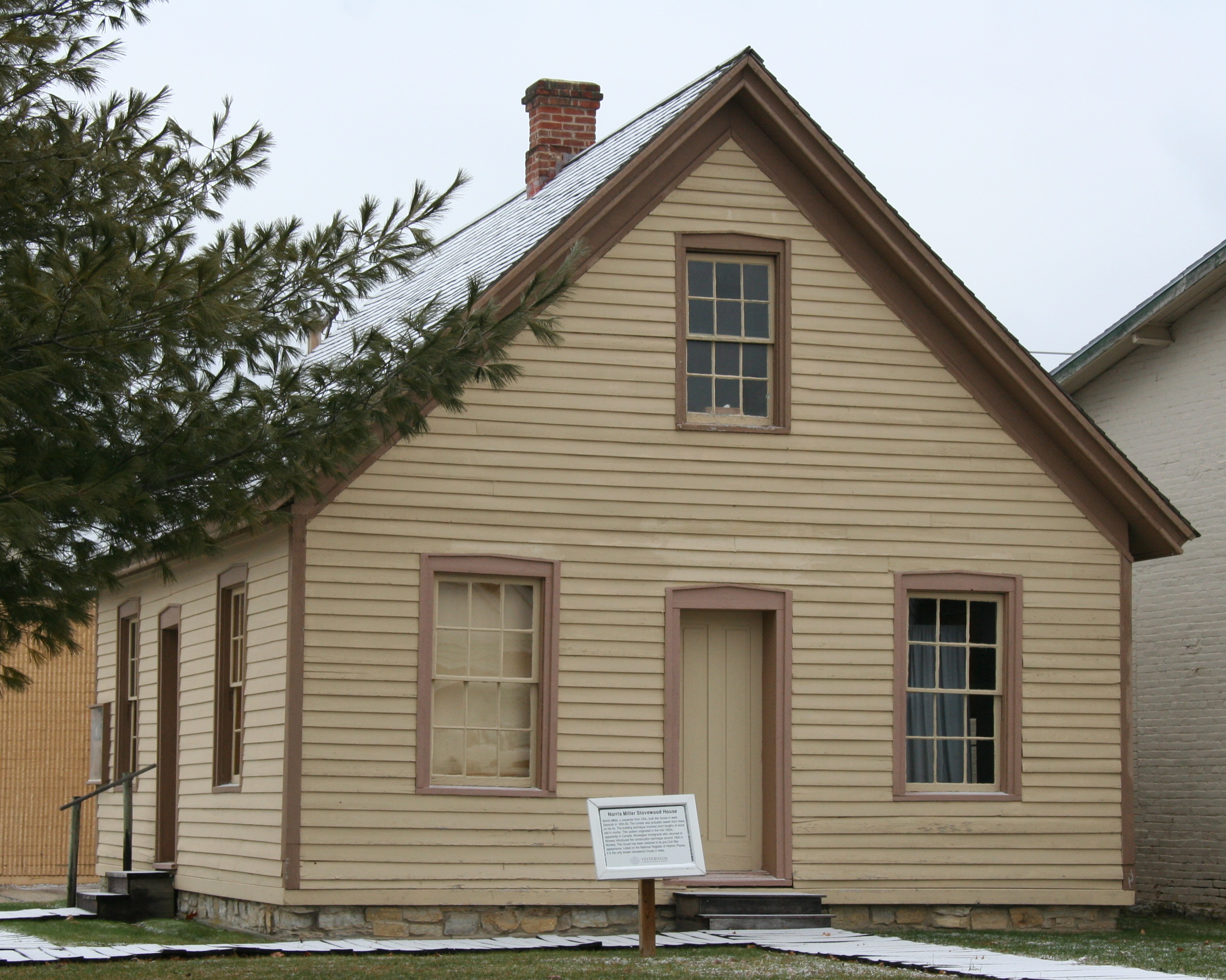
Norris Miller House

The Norris Miller House is at 118 North Mill Street, in Heritage Park. Norris Miller, a carpenter from Ohio, built this house in west Decorah in 1856. It was listed on the National Register of Historic Places in 1976.

=== Haugan House ===
Norwegian immigrants Hans and Anna Haugan built the house on a farm southeast of Decorah during the 1860s and lived in it at least until 1880. The house is a representative example of the husmann dwelling (Norwegian: hytte) used in Norway during the 19th Century. Husmann is the name for the Norwegian tenant farmer with leasehold estate somewhat similar to the Swedish torp or the Scottish crofter. The husmann formed a key element of the Norwegian farm culture. The house used by typical husmann was often a simple log cabin or cottage made of rough hewed lumber.

=== Valdres House ===
This represents a typical Norwegian landowner's home. The Valdres House was built about 1795 on the Moahaugen farm in Heggenes in what is now Øystre Slidre Municipality in Innlandet county, Norway. The house was enlarged and a covered entry added in the 1860s. Vesterheim acquired the house through the efforts of the rosemaler Sigmund Aarseth and of Kolbein Dahle, director of the Valdres Folk Museum in Fagernes, in the valley of Valdres, Norway. The house was taken down and shipped to Vesterheim in 1975-76. The house was reassembled by Norwegian carpenters commissioned by the Valdres Folk Museum.

=== Egge-Koren House ===
Erik Egge built this house in 1852 on his farm five miles (8.0 km) southeast of Decorah. In July 1853, he married Helen Pedersdatter, a widow with two small children. From December 1853 to March 1854, newlyweds Rev. Ulrik Vilhelm Kore and his wife Elisabeth lived with the Egges. Koren was a pioneer Lutheran minister who played a significant role in the development of the spiritual and intellectual development of Norwegians in America. He played an active part in the Synod of the Norwegian Evangelical Lutheran Church in America, holding various positions including president of the synod from 1894 until his death in 1910. Elisabeth Koren was an author of The Diary of Elisabeth Koren, 1853-1855 which provides detailed insight into what it was like for four adults and two children to spend the winter in a one-room 14-by-16-foot (4.3 by 4.9 m) log house.

=== Norsvin Mill ===
Norsvin Mill was built in the 1800s in Norway and given to the Luther College Museum by Knut Norswing so that it might house the millstones brought to America by his grandfather, Knut Norsvin. The mill house came from the Kongslien farm in what is now Vang Municipality in Valdres, Norway.

=== Rovang Parochial Schoolhouse ===
Rovang Parochial Schoolhouse was built in 1879 by the Washington Prairie Lutheran Congregation. For two weeks per term, the children/grandchildren of Norwegian immigrants were allowed to attend the parochial school to be educated in their Norwegian heritage, including speech, language, writing, and religion.

=== Tasa Drying Shed ===
Tasa Drying Shed was built in approximately 1865 by Knut Thompson Tasa and was used to dry barley to make beer. Other common uses were for drying grains for human and animal use or used as a bath house.

=== Mikkelson-Skree Blacksmith Shop ===
Mikkelson-Skree Blacksmith Shop was located in Houston County, Minnesota, and brought to Vesterheim's Heritage Park in 1971. It was built around 1854 by Mikkel Mikkelson Sinnes and was used as a home and blacksmith shop. It is similar to blacksmith shops in Norway. The shop was donated by the Darrell Skree family.

=== Wickney House ===
Wickney House was built by Anders Vikne (Wickney) in 1879 on a farm in Northwood, North Dakota. The house and most of the furnishings were donated to the museum by his granddaughter, Ruth Wickney, and moved to the present site in 1982.

=== Erikson-Hansen Stabbur ===
Erikson-Hansen Stabbur was built by Hans Erikson in Byron, Minnesota, to store food. It was built on stone pillars to keep out rodents and other animals. The stabbur was moved to the present site in 1988.

=== Bethania Lutheran Church ===
Bethania Lutheran Church was a country church built in 1903 near Northwood, North Dakota. Vesterheim Director Marion Nelson was in search of an altar made by Osten Pladsen to add to Vesterheim's collection and found one in a church that was up for auction. Because church and religion were a very important part of everyday life for the Norwegian immigrant, it was decided to buy the entire church, its pews, and the communion rail, pulpit, and baptismal font built by Pladsen. The altar had already been donated to Vesterheim. The church was relocated to its present site in 1992.
