= National Register of Historic Places listings in Bremer County, Iowa =

Location of Bremer County in Iowa

This is a list of the National Register of Historic Places listings in Bremer County, Iowa.

This is intended to be a complete list of the properties and districts on the National Register of Historic Places in Bremer County, Iowa, United States. Latitude and longitude coordinates are provided for many National Register properties and districts; these locations may be seen together in a map.

There are 12 properties and districts listed on the National Register in the county.

This National Park Service list is complete through NPS recent listings posted February 20, 2026.

== Current listings ==
	Name on the Register	Image	Date listed	Location	City or town	Description
1	Bank of Sumner	Bank of Sumner	August 25, 2004 (#04000900)	118 W. 1st St. 42°50′58″N 92°05′55″W	Sumner	
2	Bremer County Court House	Bremer County Court House	August 28, 2003 (#03000821)	415 E. Bremer Ave. 42°43′34″N 92°27′54″W	Waverly	
3	Harmon and LeValley Northwest Historic District	Harmon and LeValley Northwest Historic District	June 6, 2014 (#14000284)	Roughly Cedar River, 1st, 7th and 6th Avenues NW; 42°43′43″N 92°28′20″W	Waverly	
4	Old Fourth Ward Southeast Historic District	Old Fourth Ward Southeast Historic District	December 18, 2013 (#13000922)	Roughly bounded by the Cedar River, 2nd and 3rd Avenues SE, and 4th Street SE; 42°43′24″N 92°28′05″W	Waverly	
5	Sturdevant Southwest Historic District	Sturdevant Southwest Historic District	May 16, 2016 (#16000248)	Roughly bounded by 1st & 8th Sts. SW, 1st & 5th Aves. SW, W. Bremer Ave., and Cedar River; 42°43′24″N 92°28′32″W	Waverly	
6	Sumner High School	Sumner High School	June 16, 2004 (#04000597)	300 W. 4th 42°51′03″N 92°06′04″W	Sumner	
7	Third Street Bridge (FHWA No. 012250)	Third Street Bridge (FHWA No. 012250)	May 31, 2018 (#100002485)	3rd St SE over the Cedar R. between 5th & 6th Aves SE; 42°43′15″N 92°28′01″W	Waverly	
8	Wartburg College Historic District	Wartburg College Historic District	August 9, 2022 (#100008031)	100 Wartburg Blvd. 42°43′39″N 92°28′51″W	Waverly	
9	Wartburg Teachers' Seminary	Wartburg Teachers' Seminary	January 20, 1978 (#78001208)	Wartburg College campus 42°43′46″N 92°28′54″W	Waverly	
10	Waverly East Bremer Avenue Commercial Historic District	Waverly East Bremer Avenue Commercial Historic District	April 24, 2014 (#14000174)	E. Bremer Ave. 42°43′33″N 92°28′08″W	Waverly	
11	Waverly House	Waverly House	December 12, 1976 (#76000735)	402 W. Bremer Ave. 42°43′33″N 92°28′33″W	Waverly	
12	Waverly Municipal Hydroelectric Powerhouse	Waverly Municipal Hydroelectric Powerhouse	December 18, 2013 (#13000923)	121 1st Street, NE; Cedar River upstream from E. Bremer Avenue, 42°43′36″N 92°28′12″W	Waverly	A boundary increase was approved February 23, 2026.

== Former listings ==
	Name on the Register	Image	Date listed	Date removed	Location	City or town	Description
1	Green Mill Ford Bridge		August 28, 2003 (#98000760)	September 19, 2019	County road over the Cedar River; 42°40′20″N 92°25′44″W	Janesville	Destroyed by a flood in 2019.
2	Octagon Barn		June 30, 1986 (#86001418)	April 29, 1993	East of US 218	Plainfield vicinity	

== See also ==
- List of National Historic Landmarks in Iowa
- National Register of Historic Places listings in Iowa
- Listings in neighboring counties: Black Hawk, Buchanan, Butler, Chickasaw, Fayette, Floyd
