= Laurie Schipper =

American social worker (born 1962)

- Born: December 4, 1962 (age 63); Waverly, Iowa, U.S.
- Education: Iowa State University
- Known for: Social worker focused on domestic violence against women

Laurie Schipper (born December 4, 1962) is an American women's rights social worker. She focuses on domestic violence against women. For 27 years, she was the Executive Director of the Iowa Coalition Against Domestic Violence. She works with the organization Galvanize USA. Schipper was inducted into the Iowa Women's Hall of Fame in 2022.

== Early life and education ==
Schipper was born on December 4, 1962, in Waverly, Iowa, to Terry Savage and Dixie Vanderwerf. Schipper spent her childhood in Shell Rock, Iowa, and graduated from Waverly-Shell Rock Senior High School in 1981. She attended Iowa State University to study social work and volunteered at the Story County Rape Crisis and Advocacy Center, now renamed to Assault Care Center Extending Shelter and Services (ACCESS). In 1985, Schipper graduated with a bachelor's degree in social work.

== Career ==
Schipper was the Executive Director of the Iowa Coalition Against Domestic Violence for 27 years. As part of that organization, Schipper developed it, discussed matters with legislators, and testified in court. In 2009, Schipper worked with the organization to support the Skylark Project to help parole women who already served years in jail. She began supporting the project after Dixie Shanahan's case in which Shanahan murdered her abusive husband. Schipper testified during Shanahan's trial as an expert in domestic violence. She mentioned Stockholm syndrome due to Shanahan returning to her husband multiple times which caught the attention of the jury.

Iowa offers domestic violence protection by allowing a person to be arrested if there is probable cause that they were responsible for domestic assault. However, that is only offered to domestic violence happening to someone who is married or has a child with whoever was accused, so it does not apply to people who are only dating. In 2014, Schipper tried to help pass a bill that would help domestic violence victims if they were dating.

She works for the organization Galvanize USA to help empower women. In 2020, Schipper was among the 45 leaders of domestic violence and sexual assault groups who signed a letter entitled Moment of Truth to acknowledge that the leaders did not support certain people and movements, such as people who are not white. In her resignation letter from the coalition, Schipper wrote,

This is a truth I have been thinking about for a number of years, recognizing that I am one of those white women who took on a leadership role at age thirty and stayed forever, never making room to center the leadership of women of color. … It became clear to me during our staff discussions that it was, indeed, time for me to move on.

Prior to being inducted into the Iowa Women's Hall of Fame in 2022, Schipper wrote letters to prior winners and went to their recognition ceremonies. Schipper started her career to cause systemic changes, but she wants her legacy to be improving the world for her grandchildren.
