= KWAY =

KWAY may refer to:

- KWAY (AM), a radio station (1470 AM) licensed to Waverly, Iowa, United States
- KWAY-FM, a radio station (99.3 FM) licensed to Waverly, Iowa, United States
- Greene County Airport (Pennsylvania), in Waynesburg, Pennsylvania (ICAO code KWAY)
- K-Way, a clothing brand
