= Stumme =

Stumme is the name of:

- Georg Stumme (29 July 1886 – 24 October 1942), a German General of World War II
- Absolon Stumme (died 1499), a Late Gothic painter from Northern Germany
- Paul Stumme-Diers (born 1960), a bishop of the Evangelical Lutheran Church in America (ELCA)
