= St. Andrew's Episcopal Church (Waverly, Iowa) =

- U.S. National Register of Historic Places
- U.S. Historic district – Contributing property
- Location within Iowa Location within the United States
- Location: 717 W. Bremer Ave. Waverly, Iowa
- Coordinates: 42°43′31.4″N 92°28′48.7″W
- Area: less than one acre
- Built: 1957-1958
- Architectural style: Modern
- Part of: Sturdevant Southwest Historic District
- NRHP reference No.: 16000248
- Added to NRHP: May 16, 2016

St. Andrew's Episcopal Church is located in Waverly, Iowa. It is a parish church of the Episcopal Diocese of Iowa. The church building is a contributing building and the bell tower is a contributing structure in the Sturdevant Southwest Historic District on the National Register of Historic Places.

The parish was established in 1853. The present church building was completed in 1958 after the previous church building had been destroyed in a fire on March 14, 1957. The cornerstone for the present church was laid on November 3, 1957. It is a Modern A-frame brick structure that is ten bays long. The bays project at an angle. Each has a window in the angle and an I-beam that serves as a buttress. On the interior, the I-beams are clad in a wood veneer. The short side walls are covered with brick laid in a stack bond. The brick on the west gabled end is laid in Flemish bond and features a series of small raised crosses in the brick pattern work. The east gable end was remodeled around 2006 and is composed of a combination of brick and synthetic metal siding. It has a large Celtic cross with windows that extend to the peak. A spire, divided into five sections, and a Celtic cross caps the steeply pitched roof.

The Hemingway Memorial Bell Tower was completed in 1963. It stands north of the church building and is composed of two sets of two I-beams that form a St. Andrew's Cross. It is capped with a gabled roof in an A-frame form that mimics the church building. The bell is suspended below the A-frame.

In 2024, a financial company opened its office in the former church building.
