= Fourth Ward Historic District =

Fourth Ward Historic District may refer to:

- Fourth Ward Historic District (Greenwich, Connecticut)
- Fourth Ward Historic District (Albuquerque, New Mexico)
- Old Fourth Ward Southeast Historic District in Waverly, Iowa
