= Paul Stumme-Diers =

American Lutheran bishop (born 1960)

Reverend Paul Stumme-Diers
- Bishop
- In office: 2002-2009
- Predecessor: Peter Rogness
- Successor: David W. Olson

Personal details
- Born: 1960 (age 65–66) Waverly, Iowa

Paul Stumme-Diers (born 1960) was a bishop of the Evangelical Lutheran Church in America (ELCA) Greater Milwaukee Synod.

Born in 1960 in Waverly, Iowa, Stumme-Diers is the fourth of five children of Herman and Dorothy Diers. He was baptized at St. Paul's Lutheran Church in Waverly and graduated from Waverly-Shell Rock Senior High School. In 1982, he graduated from Pacific Lutheran University in Tacoma, Washington with a bachelor's degree in political science.

Paul and Laurie Stumme-Diers were married in 1983 in Waverly. Both attended Wartburg Theological Seminary in Dubuque, Iowa and graduated with masters of divinity degrees in 1988. On August 13, 1989, they were ordained at St. Paul's in Waverly. In September 1989, he was called to serve at Resurrection Lutheran Church in New Berlin, Wisconsin; he later served as pastor at Resurrection from 1989 to 1997, and at All Saints Lutheran Church in Wales, Wisconsin, from January 1998 to August 2002.

As a pastor in the synod, Stumme-Diers served as the synod disaster relief coordinator for efforts in Minnesota, Puerto Rico, North Carolina, and New York City.

On June 1, 2002, he was elected to a six-year term as bishop of the Greater Milwaukee Synod. He succeeded Peter Rogness, who served as bishop since the Greater Milwaukee Synod was created in 1988. He was re-elected to a second and final six-year term in 2008.

In 2009, Stumme-Diers announced his resignation from the office of bishop to return to local parish ministry. He currently serves as pastor of Bethany Lutheran Church of Bainbridge Island, Wash.

Stumme-Diers also served on the Interfaith Conference of Greater Milwaukee and as a board member of Carthage College in Kenosha, Wisconsin, Lutheran Social Services of Wisconsin and Upper Michigan, and Wartburg Theological Seminary.
