= Old Fourth Ward Southeast Historic District =

Historic district in Iowa, United States

- Old Fourth Ward Southeast; Historic District
- U.S. National Register of Historic Places
- U.S. Historic district
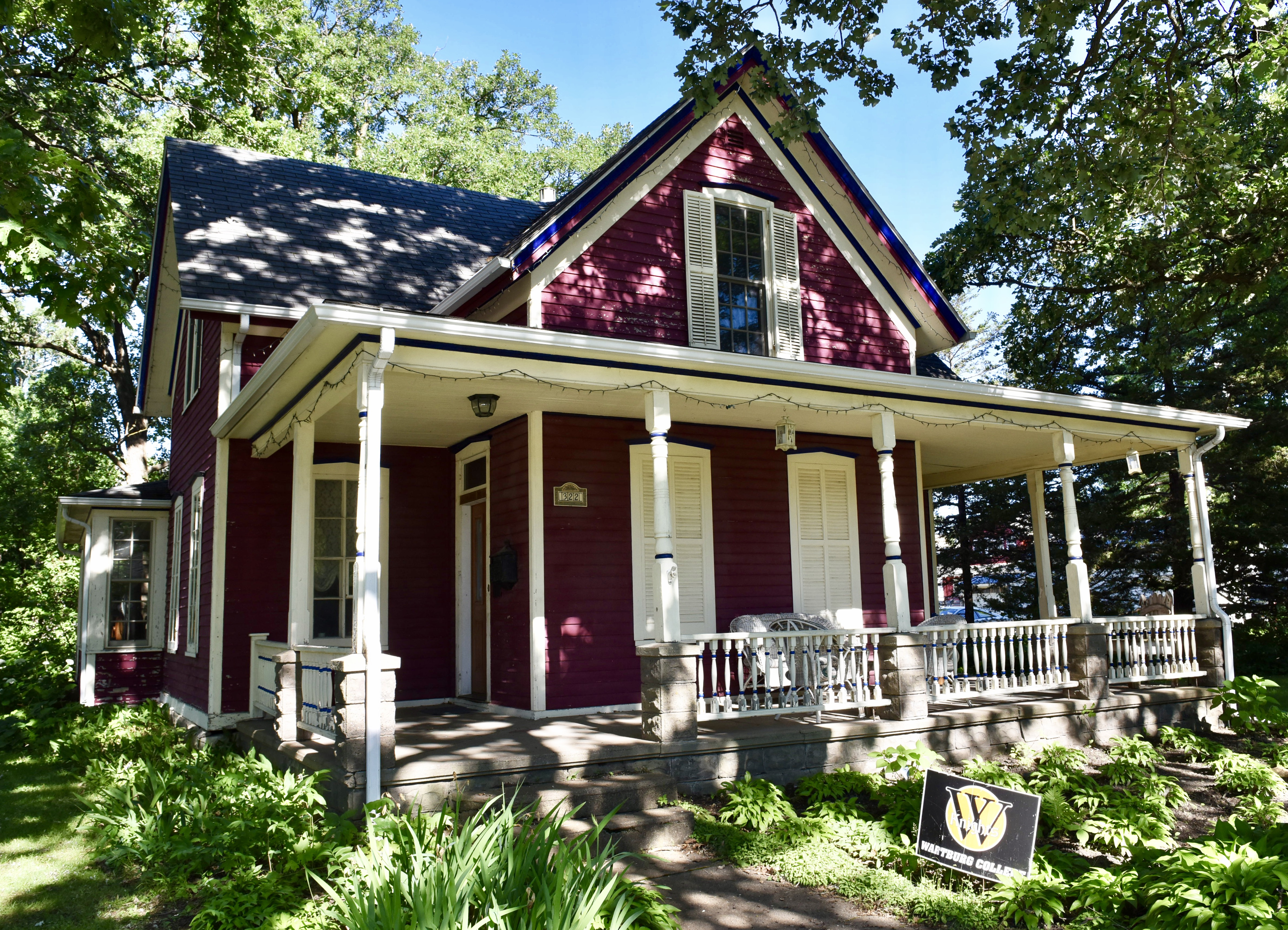

- Location within Iowa Location within the United States
- Location: Roughly bounded by the Cedar River, 2nd and 3rd Avenues SE, and 4th Street SE; Waverly, Iowa
- Coordinates: 42°43′24″N 92°28′05″W
- Area: 29 acres (12 ha)
- Architectural style: Late Victorian; Late 19th and 20th Century Revivals; American Craftsman
- NRHP reference No.: 13000922
- Added to NRHP: December 18, 2013

The Old Fourth Ward Southeast Historic District is a nationally recognized historic district located in Waverly, Iowa, United States. It was listed on the National Register of Historic Places in 2013. At the time of its nomination it contained 137 resources, which included 87 contributing buildings, and 50 non-contributing buildings. The historic district is a residential area immediately to the south of the Waverly East Bremer Avenue Commercial Historic District, and within the bend of the Cedar River. The primary resources in the district are all houses, and the secondary resources are either carriage houses or garages. All but four houses contribute to the historical significance of the district, but a majority of the secondary resources do not.

The houses range in size from single-story cottages to two-story front-gable-and-wing houses and two-story hipped-roof houses. They include a variety of the late 19th century and early 20th century architectural styles, with the Queen Anne and American Craftsman styles dominating the district. Most of the houses are of frame construction, but there are examples of brick and stucco construction as well. Most of the house construction took place between the 1880s and the 1950s. The oldest houses are located on the north side of the district. The secondary buildings date from around 1890 to 2010. The Waterloo, Iowa architectural firm of Murphy and Ralston and architect Mortimer B. Cleveland have commissions in the district as does John Leitha, a contractor/designer from Waverly.
