= Waverly-Shell Rock Senior High School =

Public secondary school in Waverly, Iowa, United States

Location
- 1405 4th Avenue SW; Waverly, Iowa 50677; United States
- 42.721265°N 92.487602°W

Information
- Type: Public Secondary
- Motto: It's a great day to be a Go-Hawk!
- School district: Waverly-Shell Rock Community School District
- NCES District ID: 1930540
- Superintendent: David Hill
- NCES School ID: 193054001749
- Principal: Brady Webber
- Teaching staff: 47.93 (FTE)
- Grades: 9-12
- Enrollment: 746 (2023-2024)
- Student to teacher ratio: 15.56
- Campus type: Town
- Colors: Black and Gold
- Athletics conference: Independent
- Mascot: Go-Hawk
- Rival: Decorah High School
- Website: www.wsr.k12.ia.us/o/wsrhs

Waverly-Shell Rock Senior High School is a public senior high school located in Waverly, Iowa, United States. It provides high school education for Waverly and surrounding areas in Bremer County.

== Organization ==
The school is part of the Waverly-Shell Rock Community School District. The current principal is Brady Webber. Education is provided in grades 9–12. As of the 2022-23 school year, it had an enrollment of 771 students, 89% of whom were white.

== Athletics ==
The Go-Hawks compete in the Northeast Iowa Conference in the following sports:

- Cross Country
- Volleyball
- Football
- Basketball
  - Class 3A boys' state champions in 2007 and 2013. Waverly-Shell Rock has had two players win the Iowa Mr. Basketball award as the best high school boys basketball player in Iowa: Mike Bergman in 1989, and Clayton Vette in 2007.
- Bowling
  - Boys' 2014 Class 1A State Champions
- Wrestling
  - Boys' 2023 Class 3A State Champions
  - Boys' 7-time Class 3A State Dual Meets Champions (2005, 2008, 2009, 2010, 2021, 2022, 2023)
- Track and Field
- Golf
- Baseball
  - 2015 3A state champions under longtime head coach Casey Klunder.
- Softball

=== Controversy ===
During a baseball game between Waverly-Shell Rock High and Charles City High School on June 29, 2020, individuals from Waverly-Shell Rock High were heard insulting an African-American teenager on the opposing team with overtly and unapologetic racist taunts. After an investigation, the district has stated “appropriate measures” will be taken. Citing a pattern of unsportsmanlike behavior among Waverly-Shell Rock fans, Charles City requested a one-year break from games against the Go-Hawks, and is considering leaving the conference.

== Notable alumni ==
- Paul Stumme-Diers, (born 1960), was a bishop of the Evangelical Lutheran Church in America.
- Laurie Schipper (born 1962), social worker, inductee to the Iowa Women's Hall of Fame

== See also ==
- List of high schools in Iowa
