= Waverly-Shell Rock Community School District =

Public school district in Waverly, Iowa, United States

Coordinates: 42.721265°N 92.487602°W

Location
- Waverly, Iowa Bremer, Butler and Black Hawk counties U.S.
- Coordinates: 42.721265, -92.487602

District information
- Type: Local school district
- Motto: Creating a passion for learning that will sustain students for a lifetime
- Grades: K-12
- Superintendent: David Hill
- Budget: $32,660,000 (2020-21)
- NCES District ID: 1930540

Students and staff
- Students: 2394 (2022-23)
- Teachers: 171.38 FTE
- Staff: 182.75 FTE
- Student–teacher ratio: 13.97
- Athletic conference: Northeast Iowa
- District mascot: Go-Hawks
- Colors: Black and Gold

Other information
- Website: www.wsr.k12.ia.us

The Waverly-Shell Rock Community School District is a rural public school district located in the communities of Waverly and Shell Rock in the northeastern region of the U.S. state of Iowa. The district spans Bremer, Butler and Black Hawk counties. There are seven schools in the district—including four elementary schools, a middle school, a senior high school, and a residential alternative high school.

== Schools ==
Elementary schools:

- North Ridge Elementary School (K–4), Waverly
- Shell Rock Elementary School (K–4), Shell Rock
- Prairie West Elementary School (K-4), Waverly

Middle schools:

- Waverly-Shell Rock Middle School (5–8), Waverly

High schools:

- Waverly-Shell Rock Senior High School (9-12), Waverly

Other Schools:

- Waverly-Shell Rock Lied Center (residential K–12), Waverly
- Little Go-Hawk Learning Center (Pre-k), Waverly

== See also ==
- List of school districts in Iowa
