= Sturdevant Southwest Historic District =

Historic district in Iowa, United States

- U.S. National Register of Historic Places
- U.S. Historic district
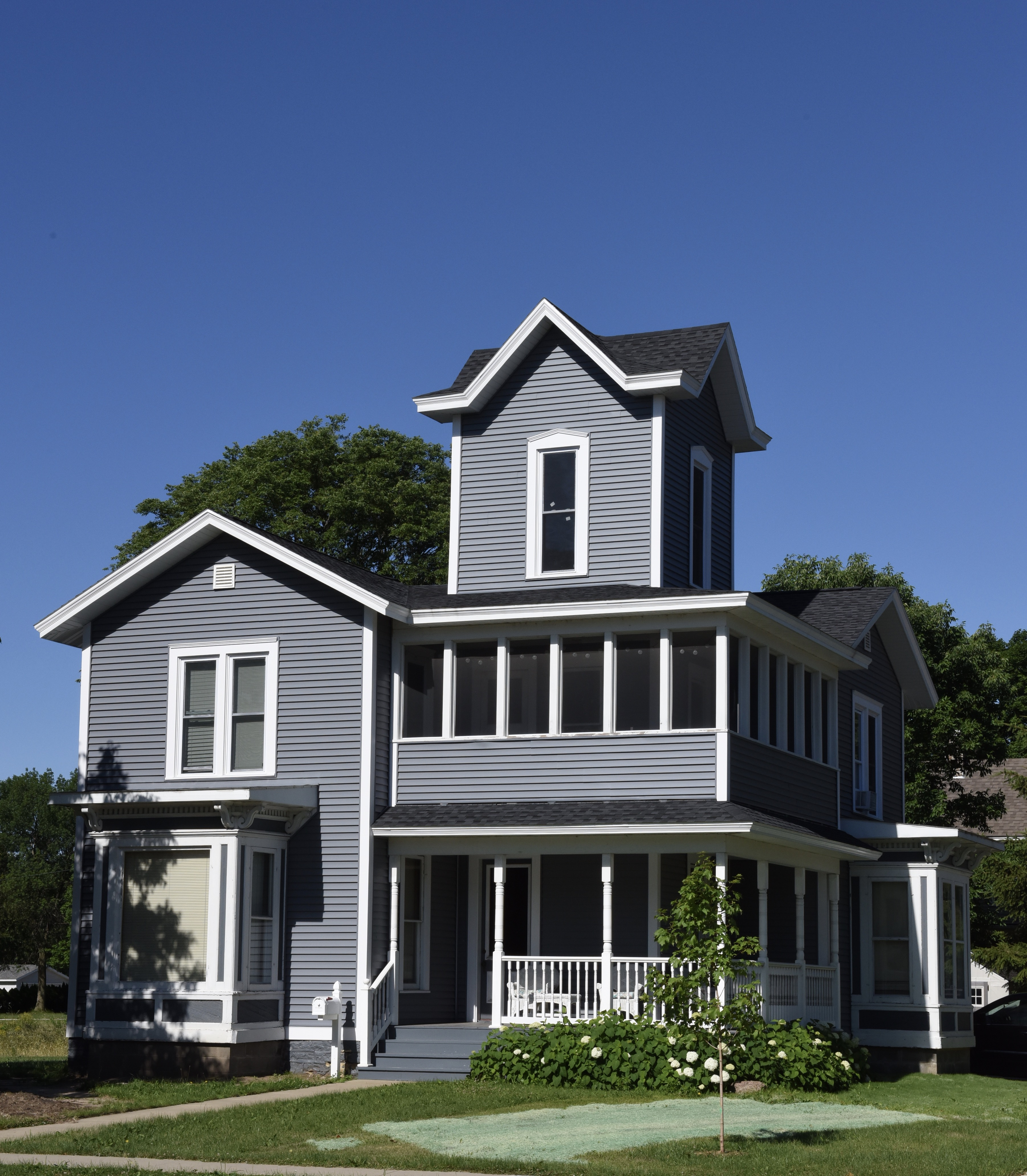
- Curtis-Osincup House (c. 1896)

- Location within Iowa Location within the United States
- Location: Roughly bounded by 1st & 8th Sts. SW, 1st & 5th Aves. SW, W. Bremer Ave., and Cedar River; Waverly, Iowa
- Coordinates: 42°43′24.3″N 92°28′32.4″W
- Area: 41 acres (17 ha)
- Architectural style: Late Victorian; Late 19th and 20th Century Revivals; Bungalow/Craftsman
- NRHP reference No.: 16000248
- Added to NRHP: May 16, 2016

The Sturdevant Southwest Historic District is a nationally recognized historic district located in Waverly, Iowa, United States. It was listed on the National Register of Historic Places in 2016. At the time of its nomination it contained 183 resources, which included 120 contributing buildings, one contributing structure, and 62 non-contributing buildings. The historic district is a residential area west of the Cedar River and south of a commercial area. It was home to middle-to-working-class families and a few business and professional people. Most of the primary resources in the district are houses, and the secondary resources are either carriage houses, garages, or city barns. The primary resources that are not residential include First Baptist Church (1901), the Farmers Exchange Produce Building, the Farmers Exchange Office Building (1935), and St. Andrew's Episcopal Church (1958). The contributing structure is St. Andrew's bell tower. The Congregational Church (1868; no longer extant) was also located here until it was torn down. All but three houses contribute to the historical significance of the district, but a majority of the secondary resources do not.

The houses range in size from single-story cottages to two-story front-gable-and-wing houses and two-story hipped-roof houses. They include a variety of the late 19th century and early 20th century architectural styles, with the Queen Anne and American Craftsman styles dominating the district. Most of the houses are of frame construction, but there are examples of brick and stucco construction as well. Most of the house construction took place between 1880 and 1940. The oldest houses are located on the east side of the district near the river. The secondary buildings date from around 1890 to 2010. Some of the houses were commissioned from regional architects, but for the most part their designs were derived from pattern books.
