= Green Mill Ford Bridge =

- Formerly listed on the U.S. National Register of Historic Places
- Location within Iowa Location within the United States
- Location: County road over the Cedar River
- Nearest city: Janesville, Iowa
- Coordinates: 42°40′21″N 92°25′45″W
- Built: 1871, 1902
- Architect: King Iron Bridge and Manufacturing Co.
- Architectural style: Bowstring through arch-truss
- Demolished: 2019 (by flooding)
- MPS: Highway Bridges of Iowa MPS
- NRHP reference No.: 98000760

Significant dates
- Added to NRHP: June 25, 1998
- Removed from NRHP: September 19, 2019

The Green Mill Ford Bridge was a historic structure located northeast of Janesville, Iowa, United States. It spanned the Cedar River for 244 feet (74 m). This Bowstring through arch-truss bridge was originally erected in Waverly, Iowa after the Bremer County Board of Supervisors found the previous timber structure bridge was worn out. It was designed and erected by the King Iron Bridge and Manufacturing Co. of Cleveland. John R. Price and Brothers built the substructure. The total cost for constructing the bridge was $16,000. It remained in service at this location until 1898 when it was replaced by a girder bridge. The bow string trusses were dismantled three years later. One of the spans was erected over the Cedar River in Franklin Township, while the remaining two spans were erected here in Jefferson Township. The Green Mill Ford Bridge was closed to traffic in 1988. The bridge was listed on the National Register of Historic Places (NRHP) in 1998.

The bridge was carried downstream by the Cedar River on March 16, 2019, in a flood with heavy ice flow. It was removed from the NRHP in September of the same year.
