= Harmon and LeValley Northwest Historic District =

Historic district in Iowa, United States

- U.S. National Register of Historic Places
- U.S. Historic district
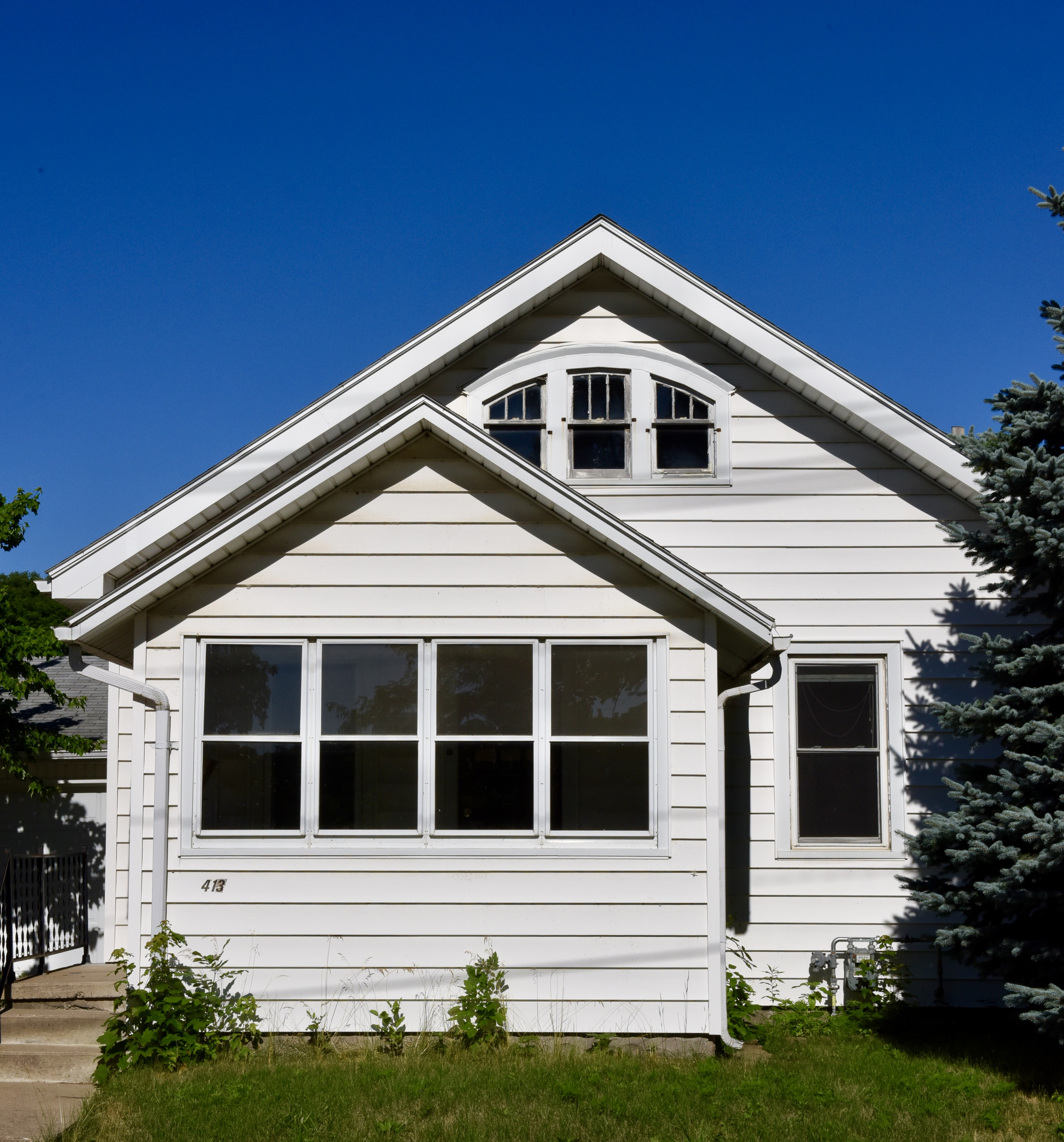

- Location within Iowa Location within the United States
- Location: Roughly Cedar River, 1st Ave. NW, 7th St. NW & 6th Ave. NW; Waverly, Iowa
- Coordinates: 42°43′43.3″N 92°28′19.6″W
- Architectural style: Late Victorian; Late 19th and 20th Century Revivals; Bungalow/Craftsman
- NRHP reference No.: 14000284
- Added to NRHP: June 6, 2014

The Harmon and LeValley Northwest Historic District is a nationally recognized historic district located in Waverly, Iowa, United States. It was listed on the National Register of Historic Places in 2014. The historic district is a residential area situated between the Cedar River on the east, a commercial area to the south, the Wartburg College campus on the west, and railroad tracks to the north. It was home to working-class families, merchants, professionals, Wartburg College faculty and staff, and retired farmers. Many of the people who settled here were German immigrants. St. Paul's Lutheran Church (1908) is located in the district. Most of the houses were built using architectural styles popular in the late 19th and early 20th centuries. The district has several concrete block houses that were built after 1907. The concrete block manufacturer/contractor lived in the neighborhood and his factory was just outside of the district. Some of the houses were commissioned from regional architects, but for the most part their designs were derived from pattern books.
