= Shell Rock, Iowa =

- City
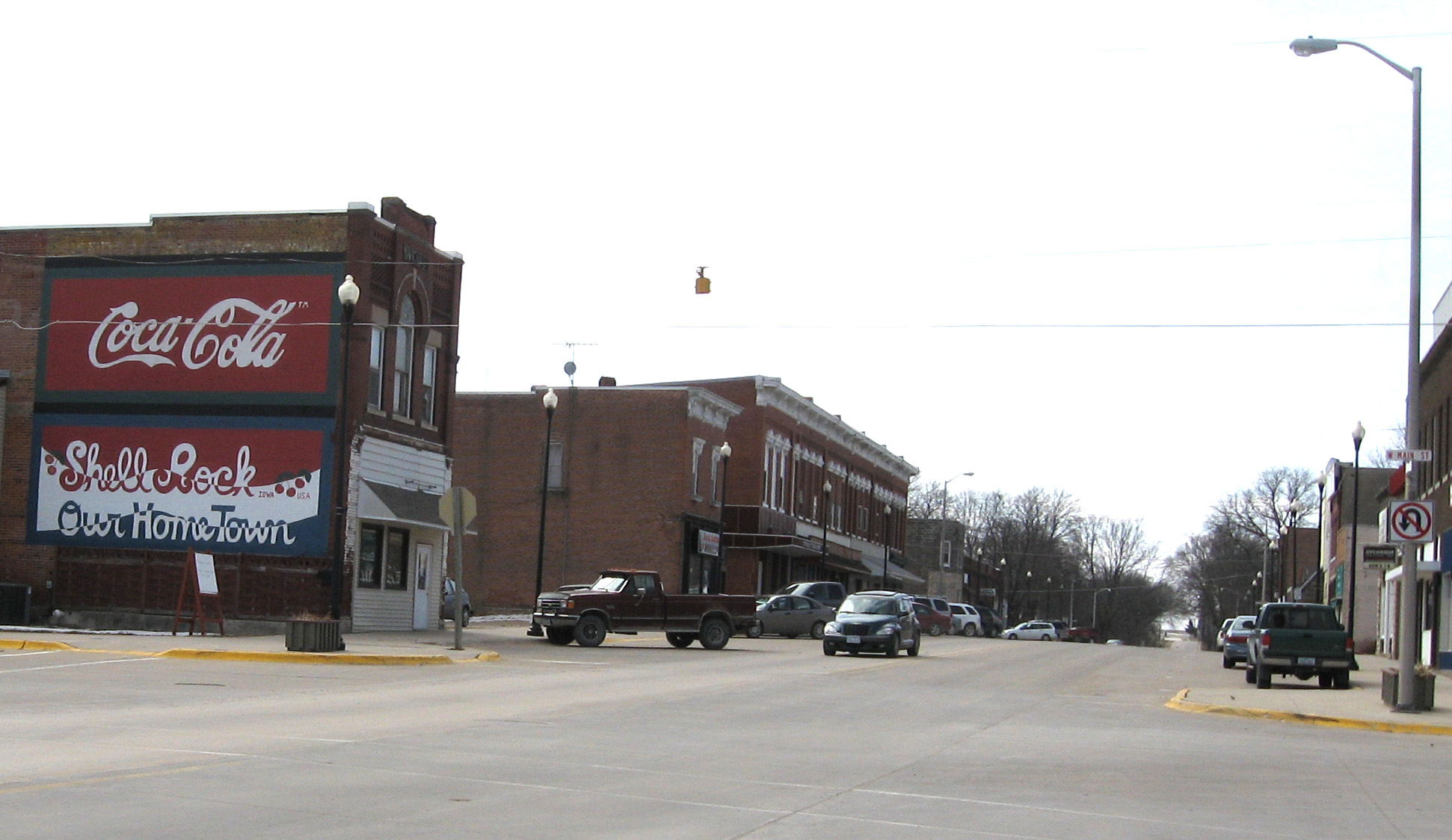
- Downtown Shell Rock

- Location of Shell Rock, Iowa
- Coordinates: 42°42′45″N 92°34′54″W
- Country: US
- State: Iowa
- County: Butler
- Incorporated: June 1, 1875

Area
  - Total: 1.70 sq mi (4.40 km^{2})
  - Land: 1.60 sq mi (4.15 km^{2})
  - Water: 0.097 sq mi (0.25 km^{2})
- Elevation: 909 ft (277 m)

Population (2020)
  - Total: 1,268
  - Density: 791.7/sq mi (305.68/km^{2})
- Time zone: UTC-6 (Central (CST))
  - Summer (DST): UTC-5 (CDT)
- ZIP code: 50670
- Area code: 319
- FIPS code: 19-72435
- GNIS feature ID: 2395870
- Website: www.shellrockiowa.org

Shell Rock is a city in Butler County, Iowa, United States, along the Shell Rock River. The population was 1,268 at the time of the 2020 census. The city is located along the county's eastern border, between Butler and Bremer counties. A post office opened in Shell Rock in 1855.

== Geography ==
According to the United States Census Bureau, the city has a total area of 1.66 square miles (4.30 km^{2}), of which 1.56 square miles (4.04 km^{2}) is land and 0.10 square miles (0.26 km^{2}) is water.

== Demographics ==
Historical populations
Year	Pop.	±%
1880	719	—
1890	733	+1.9%
1900	839	+14.5%
1910	741	−11.7%
1920	815	+10.0%
1930	806	−1.1%
1940	925	+14.8%
1950	1,013	+9.5%
1960	1,112	+9.8%
1970	1,159	+4.2%
1980	1,478	+27.5%
1990	1,385	−6.3%
2000	1,298	−6.3%
2010	1,296	−0.2%
2020	1,268	−2.2%
Source:"U.S. Census website". United States Census Bureau. and Iowa Data Center; Source: U.S. Decennial Census

=== 2020 census ===
As of the 2020 census, Shell Rock had a population of 1,268 people, with 539 households and 343 families. The population density was 791.7 inhabitants per square mile (305.7/km^{2}), and there were 592 housing units at an average density of 369.6 per square mile (142.7/km^{2}).

The median age was 44.5 years. 21.8% of residents were under the age of 18 and 26.5% were 65 years of age or older. By broader age groups, 23.0% of residents were under the age of 20, 3.7% were from 20 to 24, 23.6% were from 25 to 44, and 23.2% were from 45 to 64. The gender makeup was 47.8% male and 52.2% female. For every 100 females, there were 91.5 males, and for every 100 females age 18 and over there were 91.9 males age 18 and over.

Of the 539 households, 27.1% had children under the age of 18 living with them. 52.1% were married-couple households, 5.0% were cohabitating couples, 18.0% had a male householder with no spouse or partner present, and 24.9% had a female householder with no spouse or partner present. 36.4% of households were non-families, 32.6% were made up of individuals, and 16.1% had someone living alone who was 65 years of age or older.

Of the 592 housing units, 9.0% were vacant. The homeowner vacancy rate was 2.0% and the rental vacancy rate was 21.4%. 0.0% of residents lived in urban areas, while 100.0% lived in rural areas.

Racial composition as of the 2020 census
Race	Number	Percent
White	1,219	96.1%
Black or African American	0	0.0%
American Indian and Alaska Native	0	0.0%
Asian	2	0.2%
Native Hawaiian and Other Pacific Islander	0	0.0%
Some other race	7	0.6%
Two or more races	40	3.2%
Hispanic or Latino (of any race)	20	1.6%

=== 2010 census ===
As of the census of 2010, there were 1,296 people, 554 households, and 363 families living in the city. The population density was 830.8 inhabitants per square mile (320.8/km^{2}). There were 588 housing units at an average density of 376.9 per square mile (145.5/km^{2}). The racial makeup of the city was 97.5% White, 0.4% Native American, 0.2% Asian, 0.3% from other races, and 1.6% from two or more races. Hispanic or Latino of any race were 1.2% of the population.

There were 554 households, of which 27.4% had children under the age of 18 living with them, 53.8% were married couples living together, 6.9% had a female householder with no husband present, 4.9% had a male householder with no wife present, and 34.5% were non-families. 30.9% of all households were made up of individuals, and 15.7% had someone living alone who was 65 years of age or older. The average household size was 2.26 and the average family size was 2.81.

The median age in the city was 44.1 years. 21.3% of residents were under the age of 18; 6.6% were between the ages of 18 and 24; 23.4% were from 25 to 44; 29% were from 45 to 64; and 19.7% were 65 years of age or older. The gender makeup of the city was 49.0% male and 51.0% female.

=== 2000 census ===
As of the census of 2000, there were 1,298 people, 535 households, and 367 families living in the city. The population density was 829.9 inhabitants per square mile (320.4/km^{2}). There were 556 housing units at an average density of 355.5 per square mile (137.3/km^{2}). The racial makeup of the city was 98.38% White, 0.15% African American, 0.39% Asian, 0.08% from other races, and 1.00% from two or more races. Hispanic or Latino of any race were 0.23% of the population.

There were 535 households, out of which 29.7% had children under the age of 18 living with them, 59.1% were married couples living together, 7.3% had a female householder with no husband present, and 31.4% were non-families. 28.8% of all households were made up of individuals, and 12.7% had someone living alone who was 65 years of age or older. The average household size was 2.34 and the average family size was 2.87.

In the city, the population was spread out, with 22.0% under the age of 18, 8.2% from 18 to 24, 24.9% from 25 to 44, 26.3% from 45 to 64, and 18.6% who were 65 years of age or older. The median age was 42 years. For every 100 females, there were 95.8 males. For every 100 females age 18 and over, there were 89.5 males.

The median income for a household in the city was $36,823, and the median income for a family was $44,265. Males had a median income of $31,250 versus $22,596 for females. The per capita income for the city was $17,064. About 5.1% of families and 7.2% of the population were below the poverty line, including 9.3% of those under age 18 and 5.5% of those age 65 or over.

== Education ==
The Waverly-Shell Rock Community School District operates local public schools.
