= KWAY (AM) =

- Waverly, Iowa; United States
- Frequency: 1470 kHz
- Branding: KWAY Country

Programming
- Format: Country
- Affiliations: Fox News Radio

Ownership
- Owner: Ael Suhr Enterprises, Inc
- Sister stations: KWAY-FM

History
- First air date: 1958
- Former call signs: KWVY (1958–1970)
- Call sign meaning: K WAverlY

Technical information
- Licensing authority: FCC
- Facility ID: 148616
- Class: D
- Power: 1,000 watts (day); 61 watts (night)
- Transmitter coordinates: 42°42′04.0″N 92°28′24.0″W
- Translator: 96.3 K242CV (Waverly)

Links
- Public license information: Public file; LMS
- Webcast: Listen live
- Website: www.kwayradio.com

KWAY (1470 kHz) is an American commercial AM radio station serving the Waverly, Iowa, area as well as Butler, Bremer and Black Hawk counties. The station primarily broadcasts a country music format. KWAY is licensed to Ael Suhr Enterprises, Inc. The station also broadcasts on 96.3 FM.

The station's hosts include Taylor Nitz and Matt Ray. KWAY has local news and broadcasts high school sports featuring Waverly-Shell Rock and the entire area and is the home of Wartburg College football each fall.

The station's antenna system uses two towers arranged in a directional array that concentrates its signal toward the northeast. The studios, transmitter, and towers are located on the south side of Waverly, at 110 29th Avenue SW.
