= Waverly House (Waverly, Iowa) =

- U.S. National Register of Historic Places
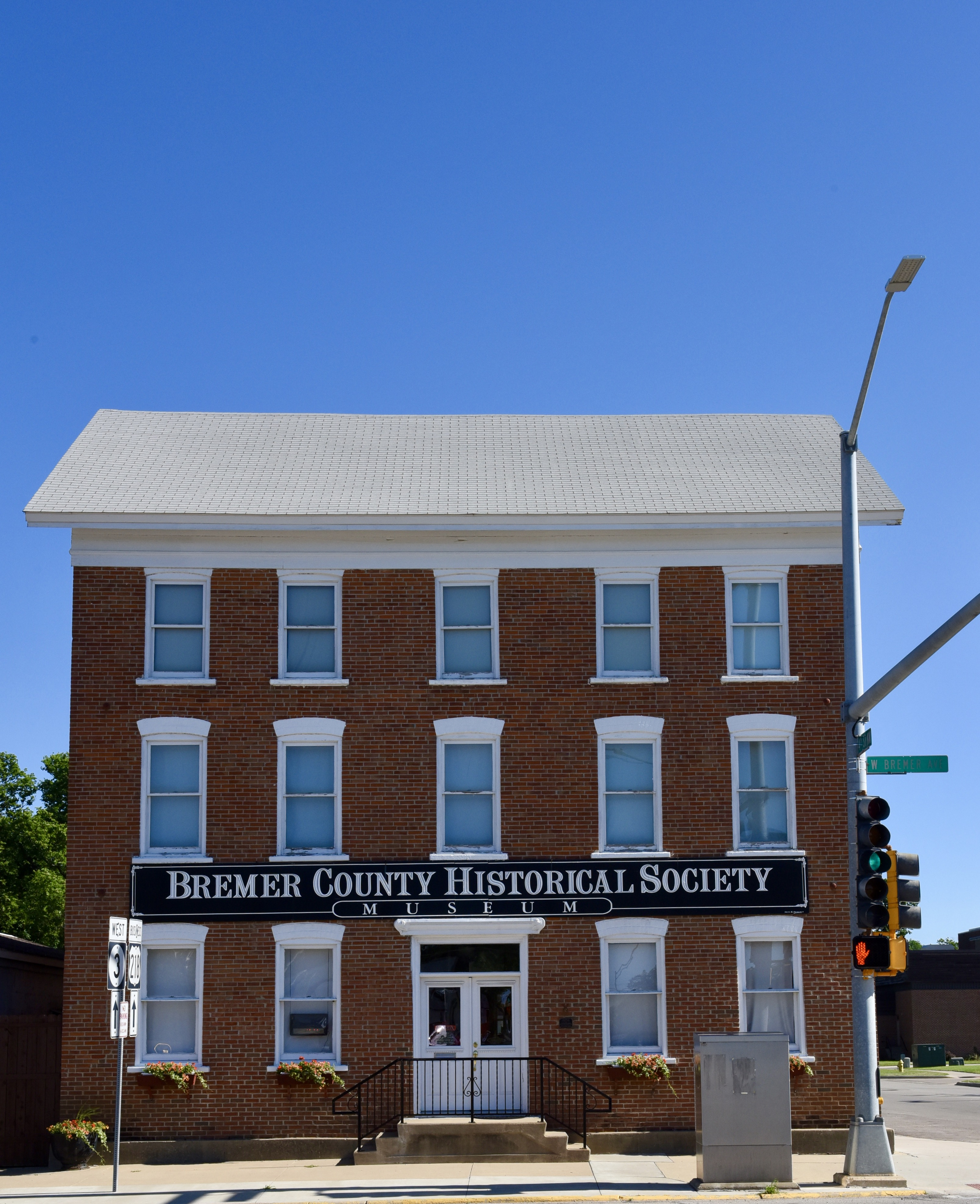

- Location within Iowa Location within the United States
- Location: 402 W. Bremer Ave. Waverly, Iowa
- Coordinates: 42°43′33″N 92°28′33″W
- Area: Less than one acre
- Built: 1863
- NRHP reference No.: 76000735
- Added to NRHP: December 12, 1976

Waverly House, originally known as Daily House and now known as the Bremer County Historical Society Museum, is an historic building located at 402 W. Bremer Ave, Waverly, Iowa, 50677 United States. Built in October and November 1862, the three-story brick building cost between $7000 - $8000 to build (in 2019, figuring inflation the cost would have been approximately $250,000). It accommodated 100 guests, had a stable to keep 50 horses, a granary and a large yard. A Grand Opening Oyster Supper was held December 14, 1862. For its first ten months it served as a stage coach stop. Barnes line and Starr omnibus stopped here. In 1864, the railroad arrived in Waverly and the building was converted into a hotel. In 1879, there was a brief name change to "City Hotel", but it didn't last more than a few months. After 20 years as a hotel it was converted into a boarding house. On June 5, 1883, Emma Cronin fatally shot John F. Stevens in room 21 on the third floor. Many weddings were held at the Waverly House. On May 6, 1893, the Prohibitionists of Bremer County met at the Waverly House to appoint delegates to attend the State Convention. In 1905, the building was purchased by Dr. F. A. Osincup and became CaPhenin Chemical Company (locally known as "The Pill Factory") to manufacture medication. In 1946, a two-story and basement addition, 16' x 46'. In April 1953, the Chemical company was bought by investors in Eagle Grove, Iowa but the building was left vacant. On January 4, 1960, Bremer County Historical Society was able to raise funds to purchase the historic structure and on July 11, 1961, opened as a Museum. The building was listed on the National Register of Historic Places in 1976.
