= KWAY-FM =

Contemporary hit radio station in Waverly, Iowa

- Waverly, Iowa; United States
- Broadcast area: Waterloo-Cedar Falls
- Frequency: 99.3 MHz
- Branding: Y 99.3

Programming
- Format: Contemporary hit radio
- Affiliations: Fox News Radio; American Top 40

Ownership
- Owner: Ael Suhr Enterprises, Inc.
- Sister stations: KWAY (AM)

History
- First air date: 1971
- Call sign meaning: K WAverlY

Technical information
- Licensing authority: FCC
- Facility ID: 543
- Class: A
- ERP: 4,600 watts
- HAAT: 55 meters (180 ft)
- Transmitter coordinates: 42°42′12.9″N 92°28′21.6″W

Links
- Public license information: Public file; LMS
- Webcast: Listen live
- Website: www.kwayradio.com

KWAY-FM (99.3 MHz, "Y 99.3") is a radio station broadcasting a contemporary hit radio music format. Licensed to Waverly, Iowa, United States, the station serves the Waterloo–Cedar Falls area. The station is owned by Ael Suhr Enterprises, Inc. The studios, transmitter, and towers are located on the south side of Waverly, at 110 29th Avenue SW.

The station features national news programming from Fox News Radio. Programming is highlighted by the morning show, The Breakfast Club, with Matt Ray and Taylor Nitz. Local news and sports coverage is also a staple of KWAY-FM and sister station KWAY (1470 AM).
