= Waverly Municipal Hydroelectric Powerhouse =

- U.S. National Register of Historic Places
- U.S. Historic district – Contributing property
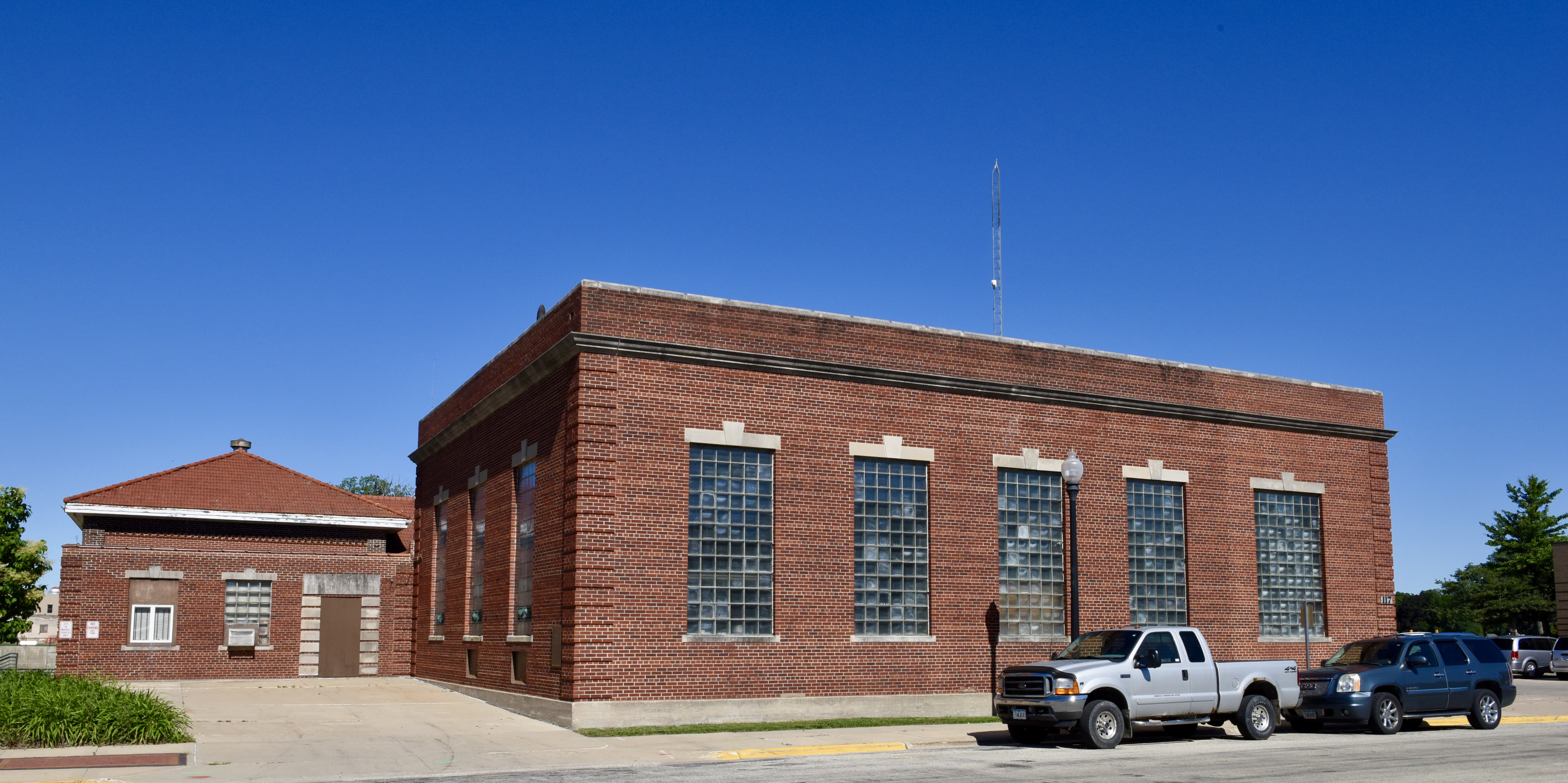

- Location within Iowa Location within the United States
- Location: 121 1st Street, NE; Waverly, Iowa
- Coordinates: 42°43′35.6″N 92°28′11.6″W
- Area: less than one acre
- Built: 1909
- Architect: John G. Ralston; Fargo Engineering Company
- Architectural style: Classical Revival
- Part of: Waverly East Bremer Avenue Commercial Historic District (ID14000174)
- NRHP reference No.: 13000923 (original); 100012734 (increase)

Significant dates
- Added to NRHP: December 18, 2013
- Boundary increase: February 23, 2026

Waverly Municipal Hydroelectric Powerhouse is a historic building located in Waverly, Iowa, United States. Mills were established on both sides of the Cedar River from the earliest years of Waverly, and they created the dam across the river. The towns first electric plant was privately owned and was established in the 1880s. The city bought the water rights and the dam in 1890, a new privately operated power plant went into operation in 1896. In 1908 the power plant was destroyed in an explosion and fire. Waterloo, Iowa architect John G. Ralston in collaboration with the Fargo Engineering Company of Jackson, Michigan designed the new facility that was completed the following year. A large wing that housed three diesel electric generating units, and an office addition were completed in 1938. The red brick facility features Neoclassical details, and is located on the east bank of the Cedar River. The building was listed on the National Register of Historic Places in 2013. It was included as a contributing property in the Waverly East Bremer Avenue Commercial Historic District in 2014.
