= Waverly East Bremer Avenue Commercial Historic District =

Historic district in Iowa, United States

- U.S. National Register of Historic Places
- U.S. Historic district
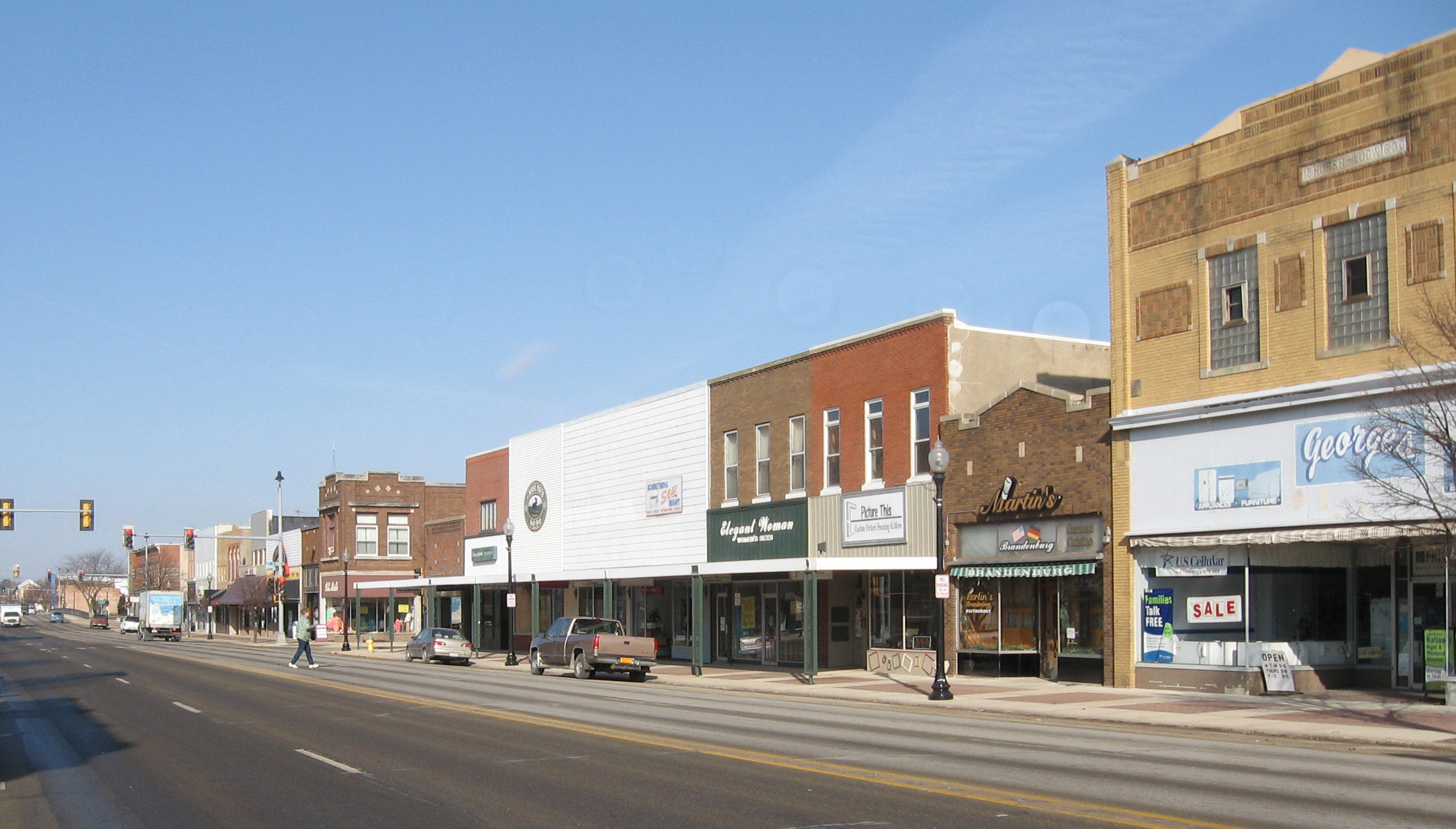

- Location within Iowa Location within the United States
- Location: E. Bremer Ave. Waverly, Iowa
- Coordinates: 42°43′32.9″N 92°28′08.4″W
- Area: 12 acres (4.9 ha)
- Architectural style: Italianate; Queen Anne; Classical Revival; Art Deco
- MPS: Iowa's Main Street Commercial Architecture MPS
- NRHP reference No.: 14000174
- Added to NRHP: April 24, 2014

The Waverly East Bremer Avenue Commercial Historic District is a nationally recognized historic district located in Waverly, Iowa, United States. It was listed on the National Register of Historic Places in 2014. At the time of its nomination it contained 53 resources, which included 41 contributing buildings, and 12 non-contributing buildings. The historic district covers a portion of the city's central business district between the Cedar River on the west and the former right-of-way for the Chicago Great Western Railway on the east.

The buildings are generally brick and two stories in height, but there are one- and three-story buildings as well. The first floors continue to house commercial retail stores, while the upper floors house offices, apartments or are vacant. The exceptions are the Chicago Great Western Railway Depot (1904), the Waverly Municipal Hydroelectric Powerhouse (1909), the US Post Office building (1936), and the Lutheran Mutual Aid Society Home Office Building (1932, with later additions). The powerhouse is individually listed on the National Register. The period of significance is from 1855 to 1964, and the buildings are constructed during that time frame. Most of the buildings are second generation structures that replaced single-story frame structures. Architectural influence came from the commercial Italianate, Queen Anne and Neoclassical styles. Most of the buildings line both sides of East Bremer Avenue, with a few on First Avenue SE.
