= Waverly, Iowa =

- City
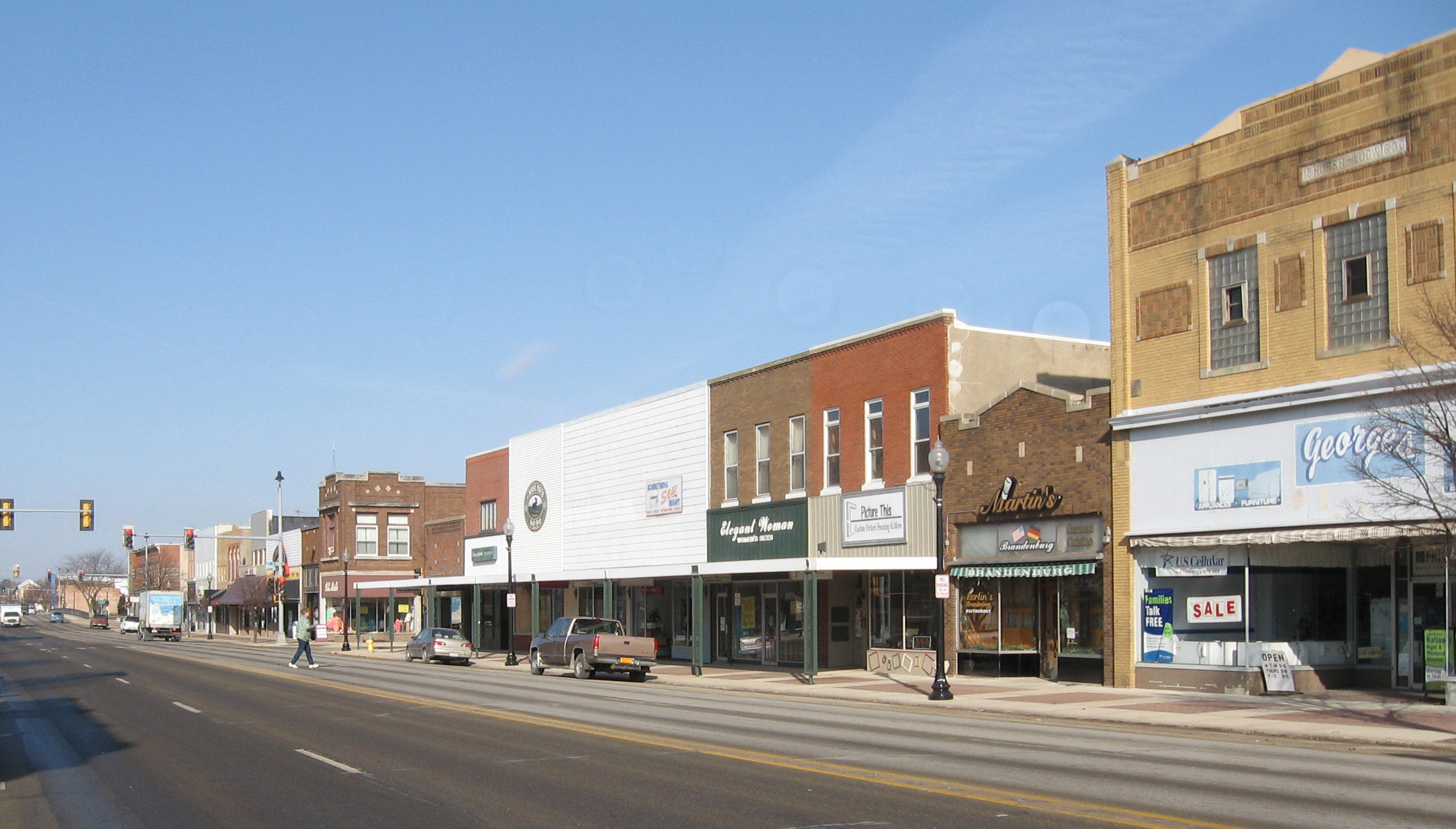
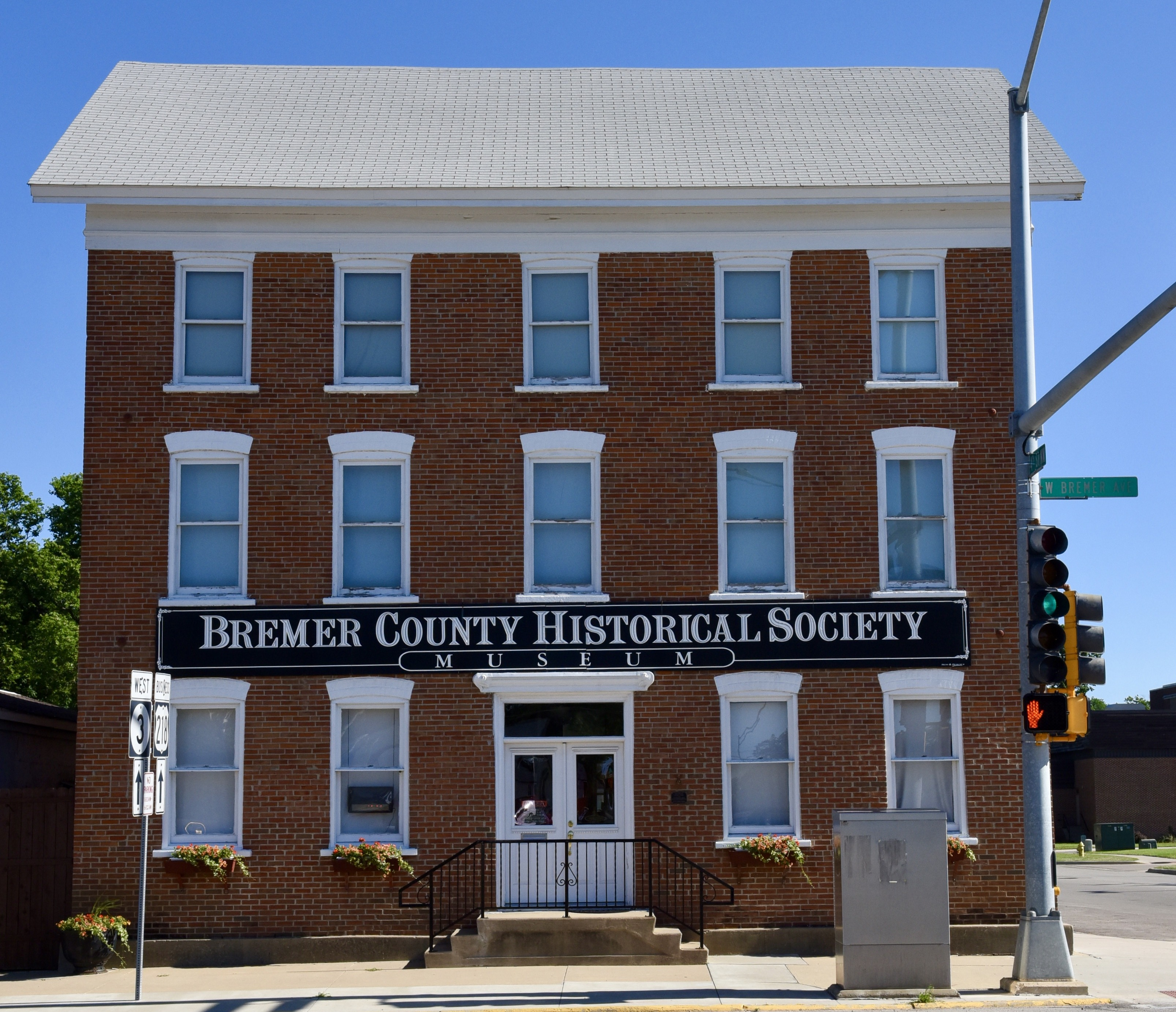
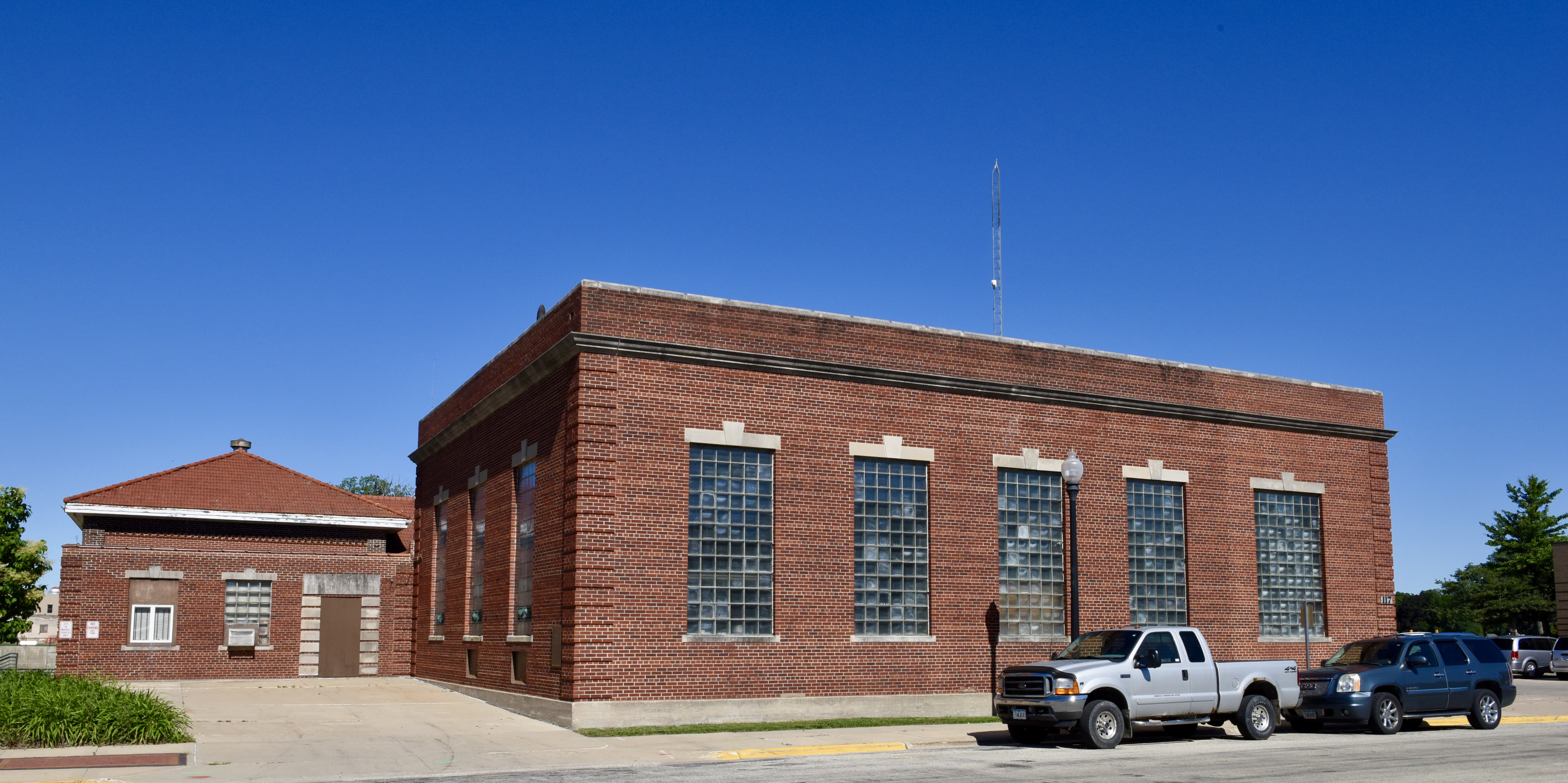
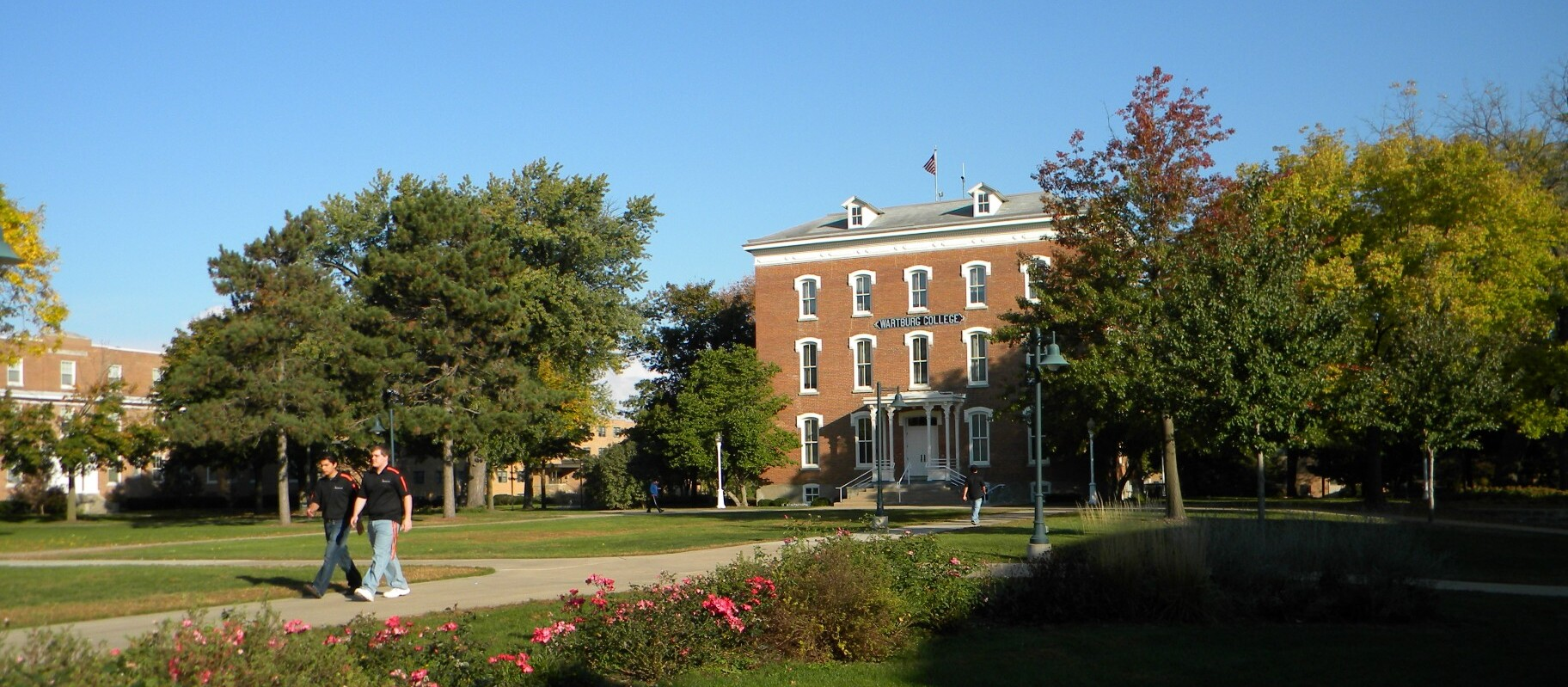
- Downtown Waverly Waverly House Municipal Hydroelectric Powerhouse Wartburg College

- Location of Waverly, Iowa

- Location in the United States
- Coordinates: 42°43′49″N 92°29′20″W
- Country: United States
- State: Iowa
- County: Bremer

Area
  - Total: 11.76 sq mi (30.46 km^{2})
  - Land: 11.26 sq mi (29.16 km^{2})
  - Water: 0.50 sq mi (1.30 km^{2})
- Elevation: 892 ft (272 m)

Population (2020)
  - Total: 10,394
  - Density: 923.0/sq mi (356.39/km^{2})
- Time zone: UTC-6 (Central (CST))
  - Summer (DST): UTC-5 (CDT)
- ZIP code: 50677
- Area code: 319
- FIPS code: 19-82875
- GNIS feature ID: 468955
- Website: www.waverlyia.com

Waverly is a city in Bremer County, Iowa, United States. The population was 10,394 at the time of the 2020 census. It is the county seat of Bremer County and is part of the Waterloo-Cedar Falls metropolitan area. Waverly is situated along the Cedar River and is accessible via the Avenue of the Saints for transportation.

The sister city of Waverly is the German city of Eisenach, which is famous for the Wartburg castle. Waverly is the location of Wartburg College, which is named after the castle.

== Early Waverly history ==
=== Indian reservation ===
The first permanent residents of Waverly were settled there against their will. Because of their alleged assistance given to Chief Black Hawk during the Blackhawk War of 1832, the Winnebago were forced to cede their lands east of the Mississippi and to move to neutral ground in what later became northeastern Iowa. They were to receive $270,000 ($10,000 per year for 27 years) and were required to surrender several of their tribesmen accused of murdering whites during the war. At that time there were three tribes living in the area, the Ho-Chunk numbering about 500, the Meskwaki numbering about 100 and the Pottawattomi numbering about 50. With Iowa statehood in 1846, the Winnebago were moved again. In an 1845 treaty, the Winnebago exchanged their Iowa lands for the 800,000-acre (3,200 km^{2}) Long Prairie (Crow Wing River) reserve in Minnesota and $190,000. In 1848, a detachment of United States troops from Fort Atkinson, Iowa, came to enforce the removal. All told, between 1840 and 1863, the Winnebagoes were moved five times. They were pushed first to northeastern Iowa, then to Long Prairie, Minnesota, then to Blue Earth, Minnesota, then to Crow Creek, South Dakota. In 1865, after the constant upheaval cost 700 tribal members’ lives, the Winnebago Reservation in Nebraska was established by the treaties of 1865 and 1874. The tribe lost more than two thirds of this land in the General Allotment Act of 1887. By 1913, only 120,000 acres (490 km^{2}) of cropland, woodland, and pasture remained. The tribe is federally recognized and organized under the 1934 Indian Reorganization Act. The Winnebago Tribe established a constitution in 1936 which was amended in 1968.

=== Settlement ===
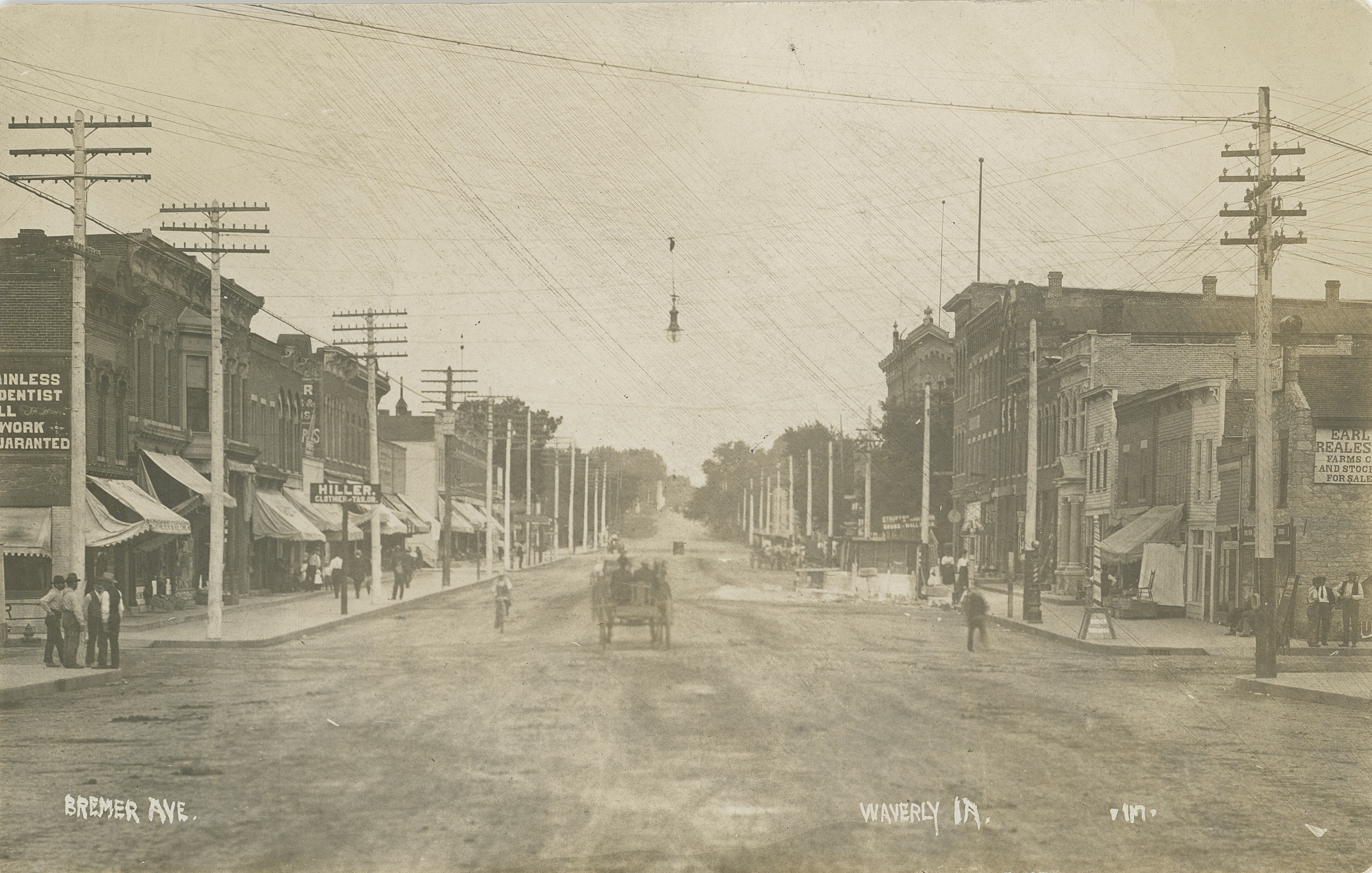
Main Street, 1900

Frederick Cretzmeyer is credited with being the first European settler in Waverly. Having purchased 160 acres (0.6 km^{2}) in 1852, he built a log hut on the east side of the Cedar River (or what was once called the Red Cedar River). Soon more homes were constructed as other settlers arrived, with some of their later homes built just over the hill behind the old recycling center.

William Patterson Harmon came to Waverly in the spring of 1853 with the idea of establishing a town and a saw mill. He purchased most of what is Waverly from the United States Government for $1.25 an acre. The area was incorporated as a town on April 25, 1859, according to the Library of the State of Iowa. (A centennial celebration was held in August 1956.)

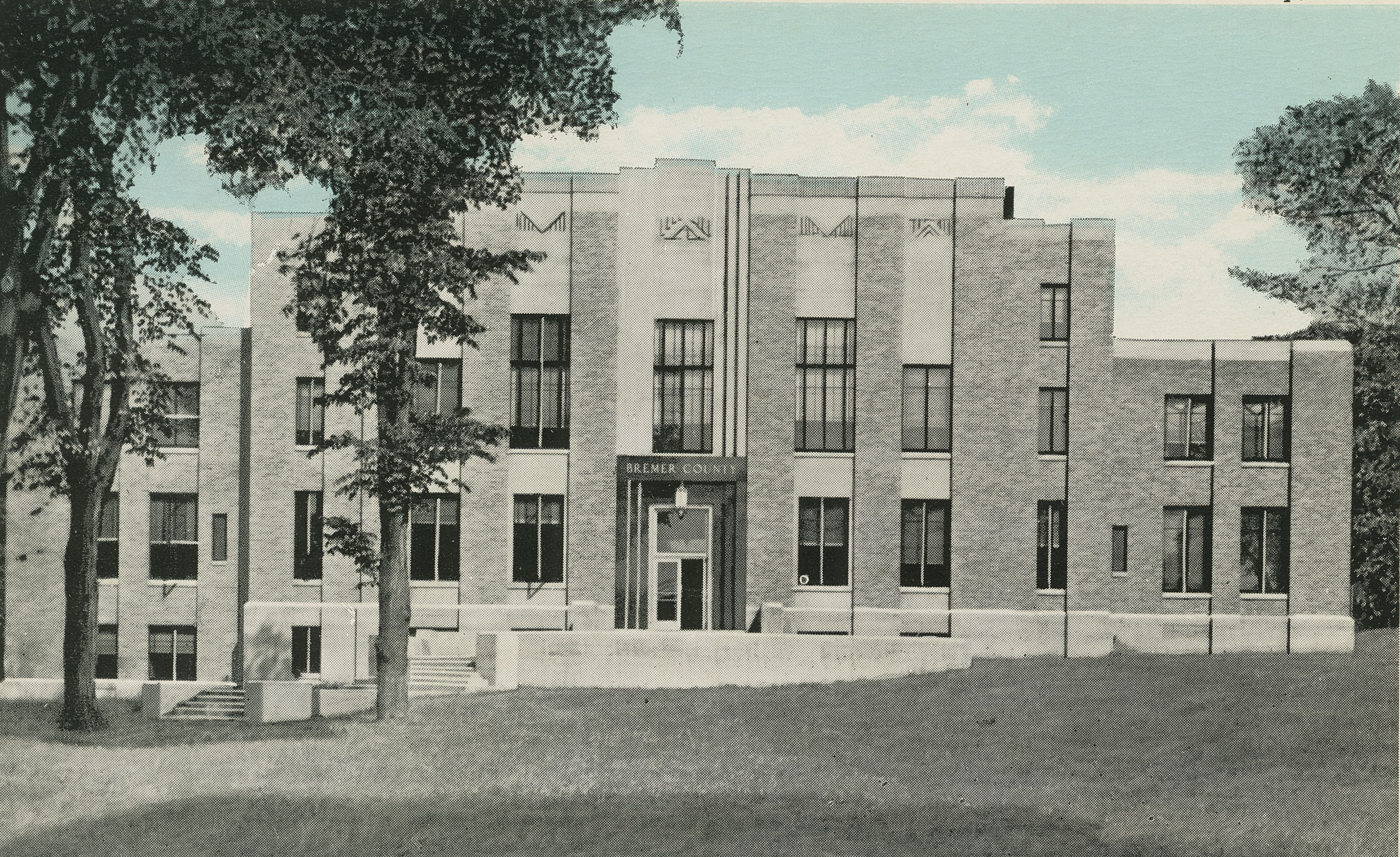
Bremer County Courthouse in Waverly, 1935

Two stories exist on how the town was named. The speaker at the ceremony was said to have been a fan of Sir Walter Scott's Waverley novels and when it came time to name the town (which settlers had wanted to call Harmonville or Harmon) he inadvertently called it Waverly. The myth goes that Jennie Harmon Case later wrote that it was her father who was the speaker and that he made the decision to name the town after the favorite book, instead of the proposed "Harmonville." Coincidentally, Bremer County's name also honors a person eminent in literature. Bremer was named in 1850 by Governor Hempstead, who was an admirer of the Swedish feminist author Fredrika Bremer.

The first school was started by Charles Ensign in a log cabin in 1854. A stone school house was erected by 1855 and additional schools were built in 1861 and 1868. The first graduating class of the Waverly High School was the class of 1875 with two students. Wartburg College moved to Waverly from Clinton, Iowa, in 1856. The public library was established in 1866.

In 2014, the Waverly East Bremer Avenue Commercial Historic District was listed on the National Register of Historic Places. Among the noted buildings in the listing is the WPA-era post office, which contains a mural designed by artist Mildred W. Pelzer for the Section of Painting and Sculpture, later called the Section of Fine Arts, of the Treasury Department. The painting, called A Letter from Home in 1856, depicted a farm family pausing during plowing to read a letter from their former home.

== Geography ==
According to the United States Census Bureau, the city has a total area of 11.51 square miles (29.81 km^{2}), of which 11.01 square miles (28.52 km^{2}) is land and 0.50 square miles (1.29 km^{2}) is water.

== Demographics ==
Waverly historical population

Year	Pop.	±%
1870	2,291	—
1880	2,345	+2.4%
1890	2,346	+0.0%
1900	3,177	+35.4%
1910	3,205	+0.9%
1920	3,352	+4.6%
1930	3,652	+8.9%
1940	4,156	+13.8%

Year	Pop.	±%
1950	5,124	+23.3%
1960	6,357	+24.1%
1970	7,205	+13.3%
1980	8,444	+17.2%
1990	8,539	+1.1%
2000	8,968	+5.0%
2010	9,874	+10.1%
2020	10,394	+5.3%

Source: "U.S. Census website". United States Census Bureau.
U.S. Decennial Census

=== 2020 census ===
As of the 2020 census, Waverly had a population of 10,394. The median age was 35.8 years. 21.8% of residents were under the age of 18 and 19.4% of residents were 65 years of age or older. For every 100 females there were 93.5 males, and for every 100 females age 18 and over there were 89.2 males age 18 and over.

88.1% of residents lived in urban areas, while 11.9% lived in rural areas.

There were 3,823 households in Waverly, of which 28.9% had children under the age of 18 living in them. Of all households, 52.9% were married-couple households, 15.1% were households with a male householder and no spouse or partner present, and 26.7% were households with a female householder and no spouse or partner present. About 30.9% of all households were made up of individuals and 15.3% had someone living alone who was 65 years of age or older.

There were 4,166 housing units, of which 8.2% were vacant. The homeowner vacancy rate was 2.4% and the rental vacancy rate was 13.7%.

Racial composition as of the 2020 census
Race	Number	Percent
White	9,539	91.8%
Black or African American	227	2.2%
American Indian and Alaska Native	25	0.2%
Asian	161	1.5%
Native Hawaiian and Other Pacific Islander	2	0.0%
Some other race	82	0.8%
Two or more races	358	3.4%
Hispanic or Latino (of any race)	285	2.7%

=== 2020 ACS estimates ===
According to 2020 American Community Survey estimates, the average household size was 2.34 persons, and family households accounted for 65.5% of all households.

The median household income was $70,301, and the poverty rate stood at approximately 7.2%.

Educational attainment was high, with 97.1% of residents aged 25 and over having graduated from high school, and 36.8% holding a bachelor's degree or higher.

=== 2010 census ===
At the 2010 census, there were 9,874 people, 3,546 households and 2,294 families in the city. The population density was 896.8 per square mile (346.3/km^{2}). There were 3,732 housing units at an average density of 339.0 per square mile (130.9/km^{2}). The racial makeup of the city was 95.3% White, 1.7% African American, 0.1% Native American, 1.2% Asian, 0.3% from other races, and 1.4% from two or more races. Hispanic or Latino people of any race were 1.3% of the population.

There were 3,546 households, of which 29.0% had children under the age of 18 living with them, 54.2% were married couples living together, 8.0% had a female householder with no husband present, 2.5% had a male householder with no wife present, and 35.3% were non-families. 28.3% of all households were made up of individuals, and 14% had someone living alone who was 65 years of age or older. The average household size was 2.34 and the average family size was 2.86.

The median age was 33.1 years. 20.4% of residents were under the age of 18; 21.5% were between the ages of 18 and 24; 19.9% were from 25 to 44; 21.5% were from 45 to 64; and 16.8% were 65 years of age or older. The gender makeup was 47.4% male and 52.6% female.

=== 2000 census ===
At the 2000,census, there were 8,968 people, 3,238 households and 2,143 families residing in the city. The population density was 803.4 inhabitants per square mile (310.2/km^{2}). There were 3,394 housing units at an average density of 304.0 per square mile (117.4/km^{2}). The racial makeup was 97.11% White, 1.05% African American, 0.11% Native American, 0.87% Asian, 0.01% Pacific Islander, 0.12% from other races, and 0.72% from two or more races. Hispanic or Latino people of any race were 0.61% of the population.

There were 3,238 households, of which 30.6% had children under the age of 18 living with them, 57.1% were married couples living together, 6.8% had a female householder with no husband present, and 33.8% were non-families. 28.4% of all households were made up of individuals, and 13.7% had someone living alone who was 65 years of age or older. The average household size was 2.36 and the average family size was 2.90.

21.5% of the population were under the age of 18, 20.4% from 18 to 24, 21.5% from 25 to 44, 20.3% from 16.3% who were 65 years of age or older. The median age was 34 years. For every 100 females, there were 88.2 males. For every 100 females age 18 and over, there were 82.4 males.

The median household income was $39,587 and the median family income was $52,656. Males had a median income of $36,369 and females $22,031. The per capita income was $18,285. About 2.1% of families and 6.3% of the population were below the poverty line, including 2.0% of those under age 18 and 5.8% of those age 65 or over.

== Education ==
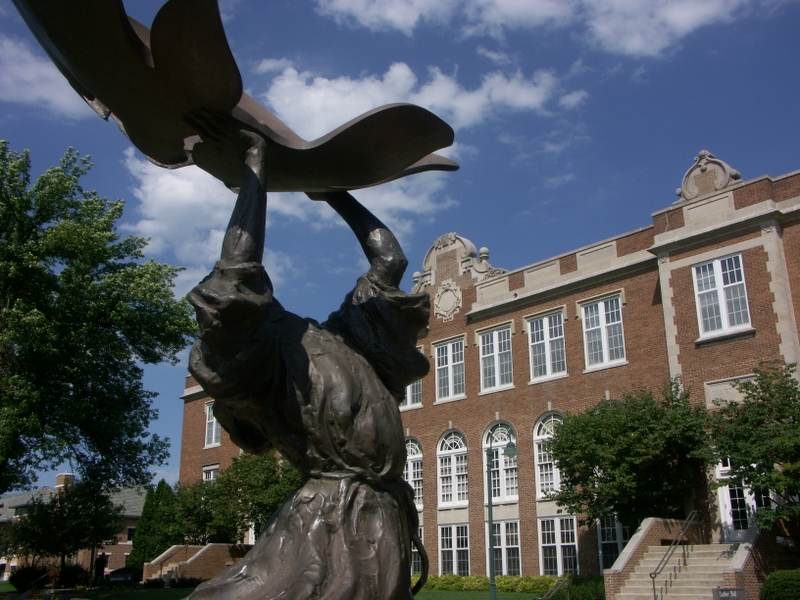
Statue of St. Francis at Wartburg College

Wartburg College, maintained by the Evangelical Lutheran Church in America, is a four-year liberal-arts college in Waverly that opened in 1852. In the 2016–2017 school year, the college had an enrollment of 1,482 students.

The Waverly-Shell Rock Community School District operates local public schools and is made of seven schools including four elementary schools, a middle school (grades 5 through 8), a high school, and a residential alternative high school. The district strives "to create a passion for learning that will sustain students for a lifetime". In the 2005–06 school year, the district had 2,020 K-12 students, of whom 1,823 were regular education students and 197 were special education students. Thirty-four of the special education students are served in Greenview High School, an alternative high school program. Waverly-Shell Rock Senior High completed building a new auditorium and gymnasium in 2008.

St. Paul's Lutheran School. In the 2010–2011 school year, 139 students were enrolled in K-6 and 87 students in pre-school. More than half of the students come from neighboring congregations and assistance is given to families who demonstrate financial need. The school offers a Gifted and Talented program; a Partners in Education Program, in which students and residents at Bartels Lutheran Retirement Community work together; and several unique opportunities in the fine arts.

== Economy ==
Major employers in Waverly include CUNA Mutual Group, Waverly Health Center, Wartburg College, Nestlé Beverage, Waverly-Shell Rock Community School District, Peoples Insurance Agency and the GMT Corporation.

== Government ==
The City of Waverly has a mayor council form of government. The city has a professional city administrator who is hired by the city council. There is a seven-member city council: five elected members from wards, two members elected at-large. The mayor is elected by all citizens.

=== Police and fire departments ===
Waverly's police department consists of 16 officers.

The fire department is a volunteer force of 30 to 40 citizens.

== Infrastructure ==
=== Utilities ===
==== Renewable energy ====
In 1993, Waverly Light & Power Company became the first public power system in the Midwest to own and operate wind generation. The Zond 80 kW turbine was installed on a farm just outside the city. In 1999, two 75 kW turbines were added near Alta, Iowa. They are part of the 259 turbines on a wind farm near Storm Lake. In 2001, the first turbine was replaced by a 90 kW turbine which has produced 111,000kwh in 15 days. WLP has set a goal known as "20 by 20-20" which means they are striving to generate 20% of its energy with renewable sources by the year 2020. The latest step in reaching that goal is to build a new ISEP energy park in Dallas County.

=== Health care ===
Waverly Health Center is a 25-bed critical access hospital in Waverly. It provides inpatient care, ambulatory surgery, outpatient services, specialty clinics and emergency room care to area residents. More than 50 health care providers and visiting specialists care for patients there, allowing residents local access to specialized care. Waverly Health Center is accredited by the Joint Commission.

== Local radio ==
KWAY (AM) and KWAY-FM are located on the south side of Waverly. Studios and transmitters are there.

== Evangelical Lutheran Church in America ==
Waverly may have the highest national per capita concentration of ordained Evangelical Lutheran Church in America (ELCA) clergy. One estimate in the 1990s suggested Waverly had 37 ordained ELCA clergy, with a population of about 9,000. This estimate was made during the days preceding the ELCA decision regarding Called to Common Mission. If accurate, this would equal a ratio of one clergy member for every 243 people.

Waverly also has St. John Lutheran Church, which is affiliated with the Lutheran Church–Missouri Synod.

== Notable people ==
- Edward C. Droste, co-founder of Hooters
- A. J. Hinch, former Major League Baseball catcher and manager of the Detroit Tigers
- John Sladek (1937–2000), science fiction and non-fiction author
- Burton E. Sweet (1867–1957), U.S. representative from Iowa
- Michael Talbott, actor best known for his role in Miami Vice
- Dennis Wagner, college football coach

== Sister cities ==
- Sister city since 1992 - Eisenach, Germany
