= Clinton Bridge Company =

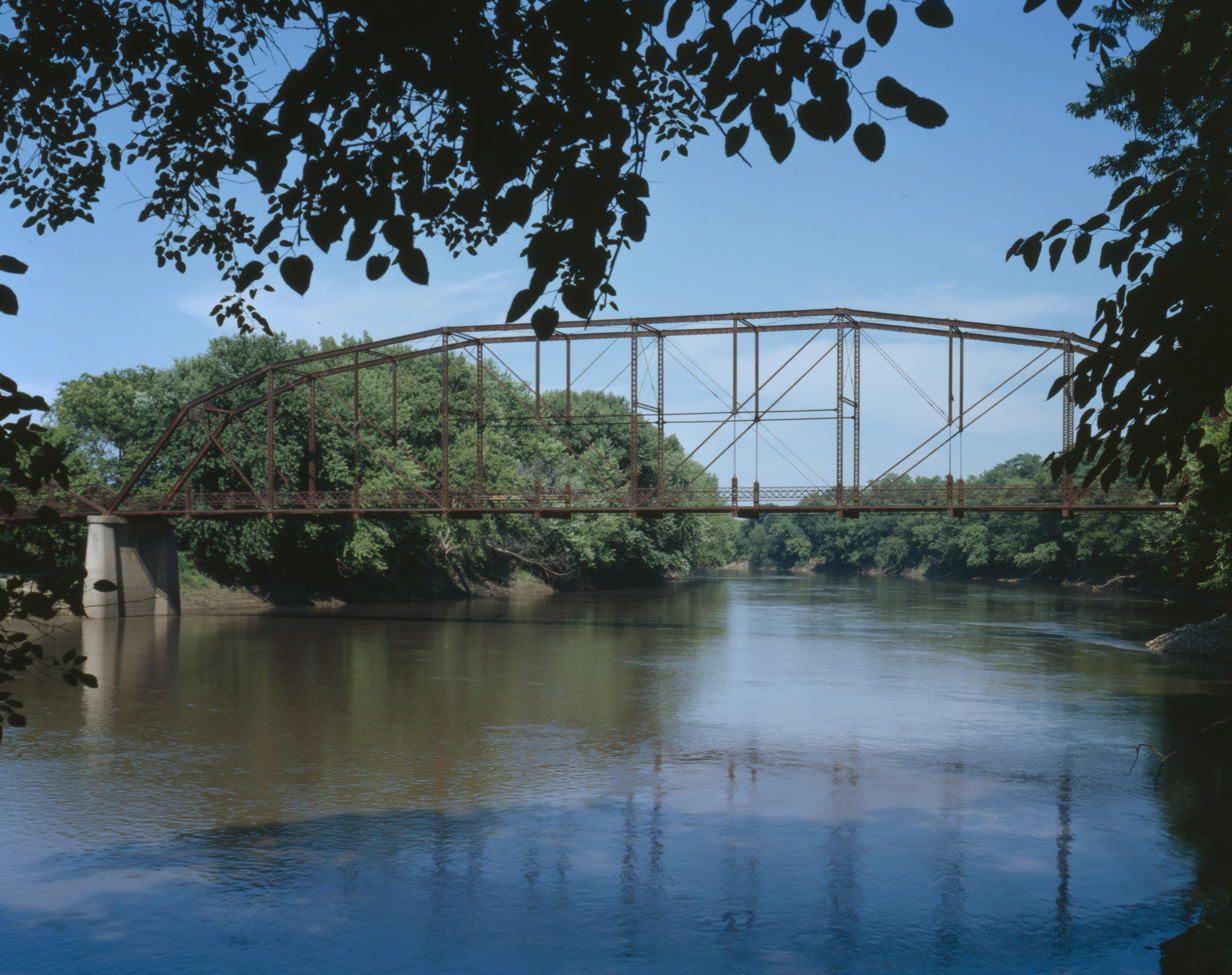
Bridgeport Bridge

Clinton Bridge and Iron Works was a significant company in Clinton, Iowa.

George Edwin Wilson (b. England, 1847-d. Iowa, 1926) purchased Clinton Bridge & Iron Works, of Clinton, Iowa, in 1892. According to a history "This company is one of the leading concerns of the state and is too well known to require lengthy description here. Under Mr. Wilson's able and judicious management it has maintained an envied position in the industrial world. Its business is constantly increasing."

It designed and/or built numerous bridges, including many that are listed on the National Register of Historic Places.

The Snider Bridge is the oldest truss bridge attributed to Clinton Bridge & Iron Works.

- Bellefountain Bridge, Ashland Ave. over Des Moines R. Tracy, IA (Clinton Bridge and Iron Works), NRHP-listed
- Berkhimer Bridge, 245th St. over Des Moines R. Humboldt, IA (Clinton Bridge and Iron Works), NRHP-listed
- Bridge No. 1, NW of La Crosse La Crosse, WI (Clinton Bridge Company), NRHP-listed
- Bridge No. 2, NW of La Crosse La Crosse, WI (Clinton Bridge Company), NRHP-listed
- Bridge No. 3, NW of La Crosse La Crosse, WI (Clinton Bridge Company), NRHP-listed
- Bridge No. 4, NW of La Crosse La Crosse, WI (Clinton Bridge Company), NRHP-listed
- Bridge No. 5, NW of La Crosse La Crosse, WI (Clinton Bridge Company), NRHP-listed
- Bridge No. 6, NW of La Crosse La Crosse, WI (Clinton Bridge Company), NRHP-listed
- Bridgeport Bridge, Old Quarry Rd. Denmark, IA (Clinton Bridge and Iron Works), NRHP-listed
- Chambers Ford Bridge, 385th St. over Iowa R. Chelsea, IA (Clinton Bridge and Iron Works), NRHP-listed
- Hawkeye Creek Bridge, Hawkeye Rd. over Hawkeye Cr. Mediapolis, IA (Clinton Bridge & Iron Works), NRHP-listed
- Little Sioux River Bridge, 210th Ave. over Little Sioux R. Spencer, IA (Clinton Bridge & Iron Works), NRHP-listed
- Okoboji Bridge, 180th Ave. over branch of Little Sioux R. Milford, IA (Clinton Bridge & Iron Works), NRHP-listed
- Red Bridge, Co.Rd. S74 over South Skunk R. Monroe, IA (Clinton Bridge and Iron Works), NRHP-listed
- Upper Iowa River Bridge, Mays Prairie Rd. over Upper Iowa R. Dorchester, IA (Clinton bridge & Iron works), NRHP-listed
