= Bellefountain Bridge =

- U.S. National Register of Historic Places
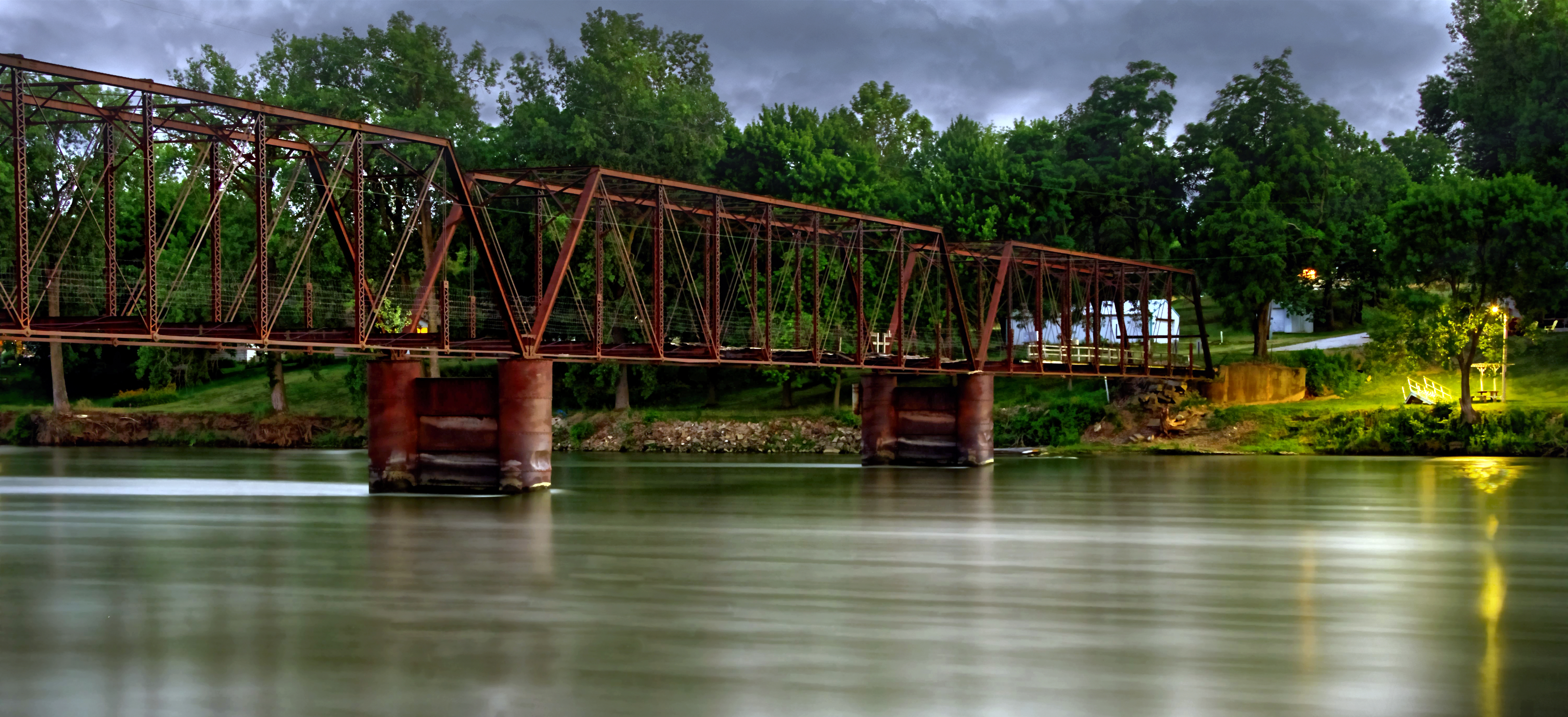

- Location within Iowa Location within the United States
- Location: Ashland Ave. over the Des Moines River
- Nearest city: Tracy, Iowa
- Coordinates: 41°16′55″N 92°51′36″W
- Area: less than one acre
- Built: 1898
- Architect: Clinton Bridge Company
- Architectural style: Pratt through truss
- MPS: Highway Bridges of Iowa MPS
- NRHP reference No.: 98000506
- Added to NRHP: May 15, 1998

Bellefountain Bridge is located in the small unincorporated community of Bellefountain, just to the east of Tracy, Iowa, United States. It carried traffic of Ashland Avenue over the Des Moines River for 600 feet (180 m). In 1898 the Mahaska Board of Supervisors contracted with the Clinton Bridge Company of Clinton, Iowa to design and build a new bridge for $9,750. It replaced a ferry service that operated in the small town of Bellefountain. The Pratt through truss span was completed in 1898. Its deck has subsequently deteriorated and the bridge has been closed to traffic. The bridge was listed on the National Register of Historic Places in 1998.
