= Joliet Iron and Steel Works =

- Joliet Steel Works
- U.S. National Register of Historic Places
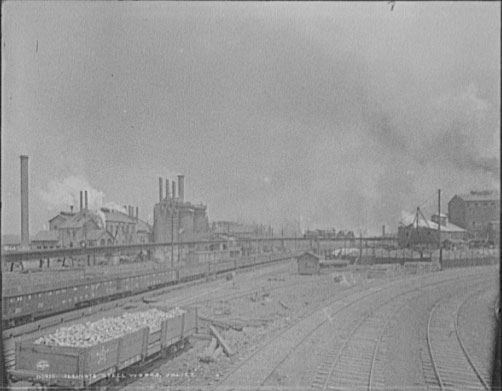
- 1901 photo of the steel works at Joliet

- Location within Illinois Location within the United States
- Location: Joliet, Illinois
- Nearest city: Chicago
- Coordinates: 41.54007930°N 88.07932360°W
- Built: 1869
- Built by: Union Coal, Iron and Transportation Company
- Website: www.reconnectwithnature.org/Preserves-Trails/Preserves/Joliet-Iron-Works-Historic-Site
- Part of: Forest Preserve District of Will County
- NRHP reference No.: 91000088
- Added to NRHP: 1991-02-28

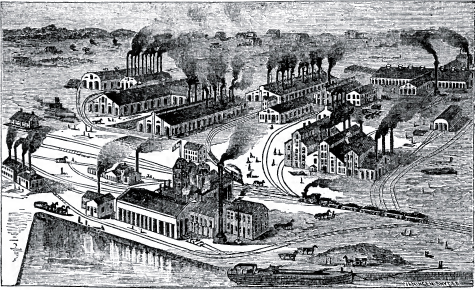
Joliet Iron & Steel Works in the 1870s

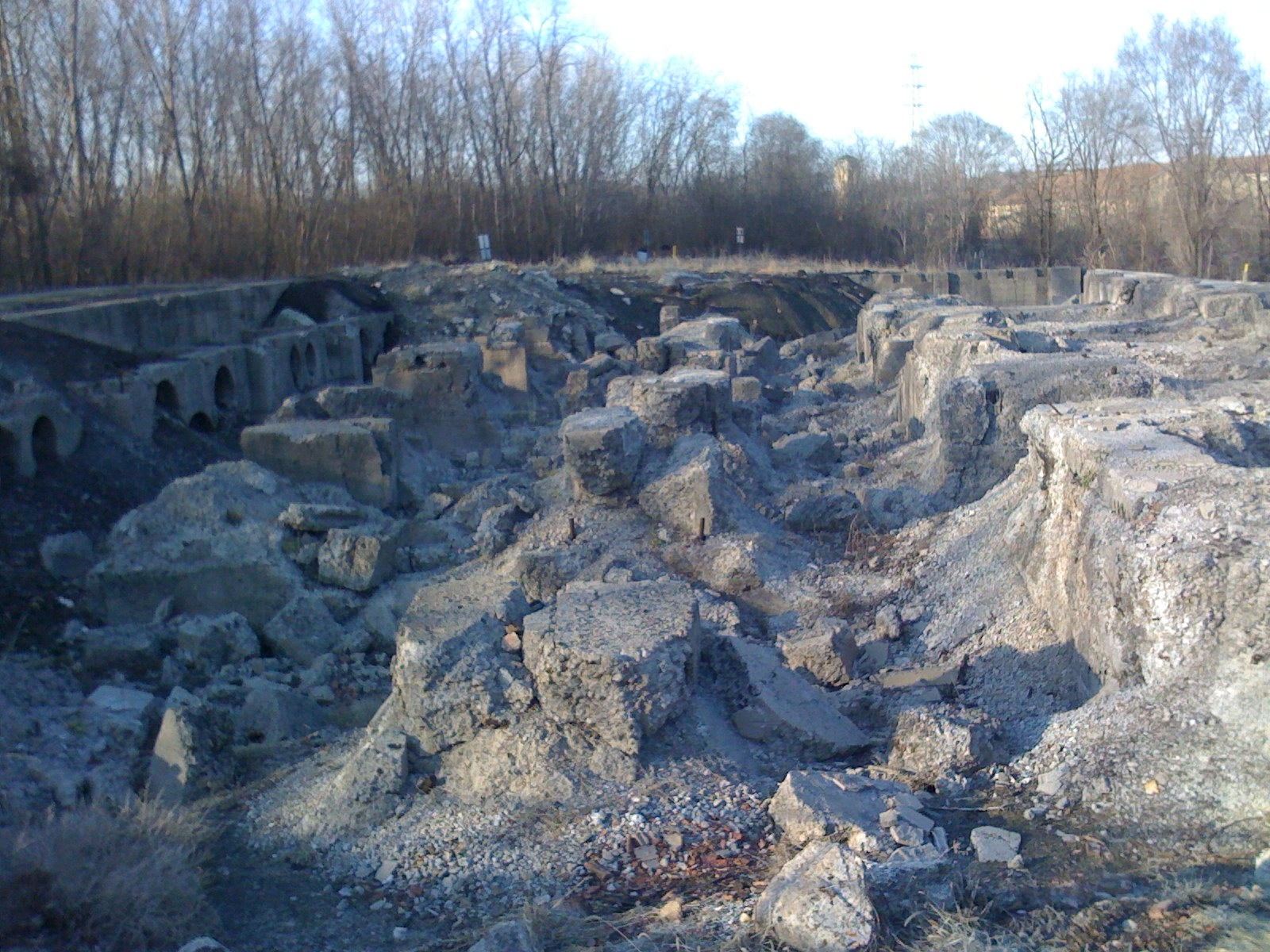
Ruins of the gas engine house at the old ironworks. Joliet Prison is visible in the background.

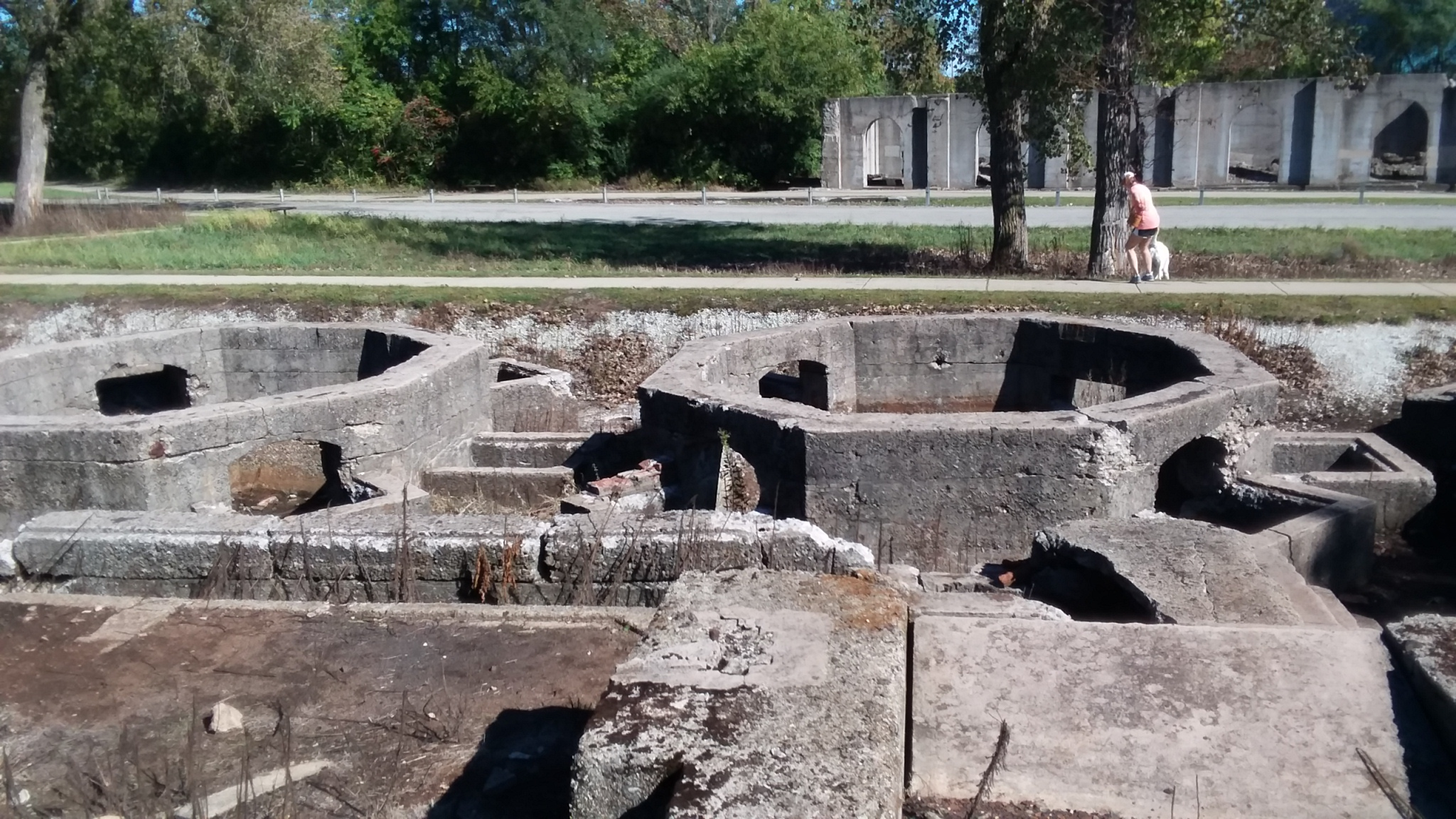
Ruins of gas washers at the Joliet Iron Works Historic Site.

The Joliet Iron and Steel Works was once the second largest steel mill in the United States. Joliet Iron Works was initially run from 1869 to 1936. Joliet Steel Works eventually became unprofitable, and all operations were ceased by the early 1980s.

In the 1990s, the Forest Preserve District of Will County purchased the property containing the ruins of the ironworks to preserve a piece of history. The district operates the site as the Joliet Iron Works Historic Site.

== History ==
The works were originally owned and operated by the Joliet Iron and Steel Company, which was acquired by the Illinois Steel Company shortly after its formation in 1889. In turn, Illinois Steel was acquired by Federal Steel, which went on to be central in the formation of U.S. Steel.

The rolling mill, a key element of the works, struck its first blow in March 1873. Railroad rails rolled at the Joliet Works played a key role in the expansion of America's railroad infrastructure.

=== Infrastructure ===
The works had a dam on the Des Plaines River for power, and four blast furnaces capable of producing up to 2,000 tons of pig iron daily. There was also a stock house, a casting house, hot blast stoves, a skull house, a gas washing plant, a blowing engine house, and a gas engine house.

=== Labor ===
Around the turn of the century, Joliet Iron Works had approximately 2,000 workers on its payroll. Workers came from Southern Europe and Eastern Europe, and faced dangerous work hazards including toxic fumes, falls from high places, and extensive heat.

The workers at the Joliet Works were involved in the Steel Strike of 1919.

Around 1926, the Steel Works employed approximately 4,000 workers.

=== The site today ===
A 1.5-mile (2.4 km) paved trail provides visitors a view of the remains of the Joliet Iron Works. The trail includes interpretive signs that explain the process of making iron and steel and the specific skills of the workers.

Bordering the Iron Works is the Illinois and Michigan Canal and attached I & M Canal Trail.

The site is also an access point for the 12.5-mile (20.1 km) I&M Canal Trail/Centennial Trail. This trail, of which portions are paved or crushed limestone, connects Joliet's City Center to the Centennial Trail in Cook County, Illinois.

Amenities at Joliet Iron Works Historic Site were renovated in 2009 and 2010. The preserve now offers a picnic shelter, restroom facilities, and drinking water.

== See also ==
- American Iron and Steel Institute
- Coke (fuel)
- Extraction of iron
- National Register of Historic Places listings in Will County, Illinois
