= Illinois Steel Company =

19th-century American steel producer in Illinois and Wisconsin

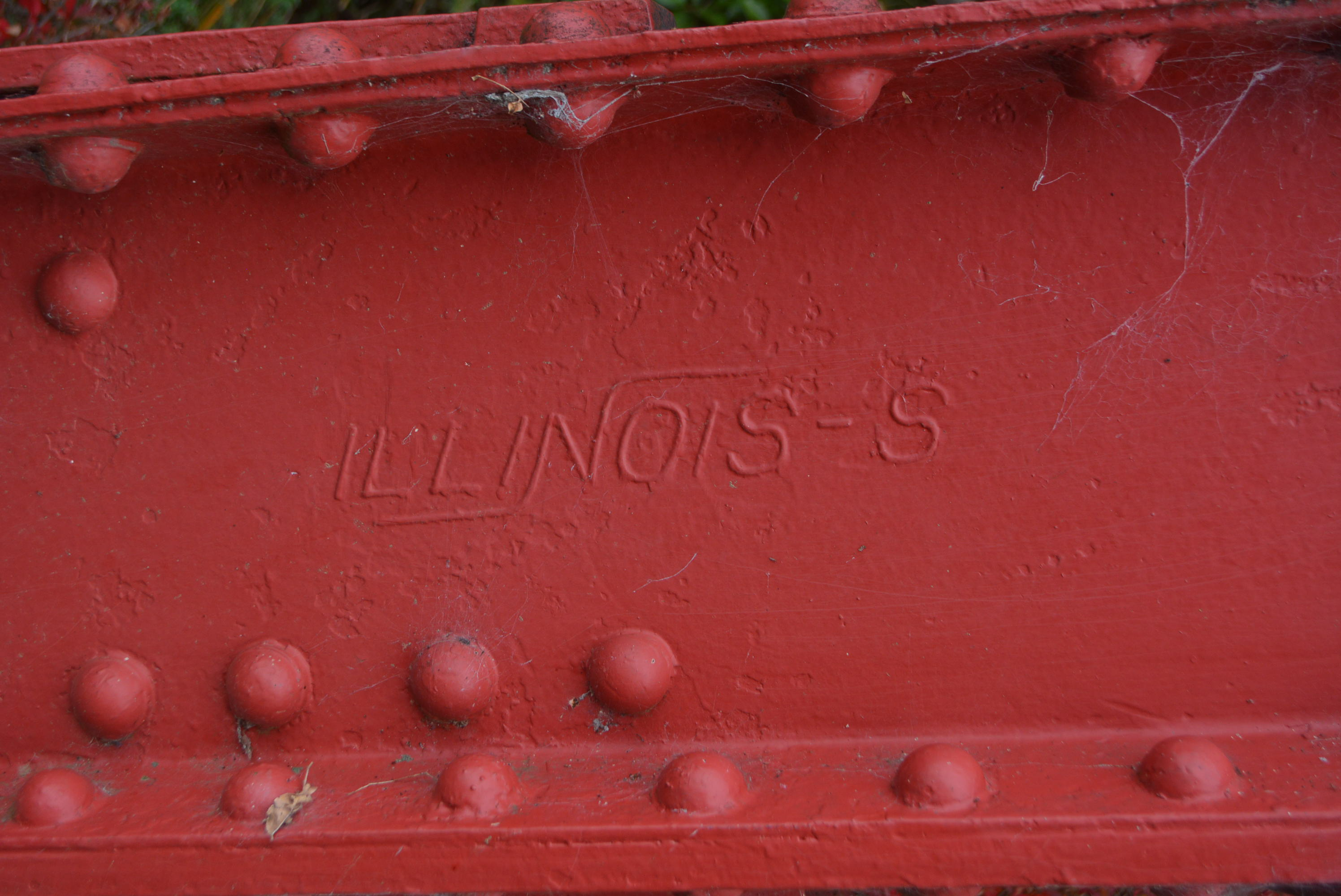
- Illinois Steel mark on a bridge in Izunokuni, Japan
- Type: Public
- Industry: Steel; Industrial manufacturing
- Founded: 1889
- Defunct: 1901
- Fate: Merged into US Steel
- Successor: US Steel
- Headquarters: United States

The Illinois Steel Company was an American steel producer with five plants in Illinois and Wisconsin. Founded through a consolidation in 1889, Illinois Steel grew to become the largest steel producer in the United States. In 1898, several other steel and transportation companies were merged into it to form the Federal Steel Company, itself merged into U.S. Steel in 1901.

== History ==
The first mill associated with the Illinois Steel Company was the North Chicago Rolling Mill, founded in Chicago, Illinois by Eber Brock Ward in 1857 as a mill to re-roll iron rails. In 1865, this mill was converted into a steel mill, shortly after the Bessemer process was introduced. The Illinois Steel Company was founded in 1889 following the consolidation of three companies; The North Chicago Rolling Mill Company had plants in Chicago, South Chicago, Chicago (1880), and Milwaukee, Wisconsin (1868), The Union Iron Company (1863) of Chicago and the Joliet Steel Company (1870) were also involved in the merge. The company was based in the Rookery Building in downtown Chicago. Branch offices operated in the Empire Building in New York, New York; the Pioneer Press Building in Saint Paul, Minnesota; the Cuyahoga Building in Cleveland, Ohio; the Security Building in St. Louis, Missouri; and an office in Denver, Colorado.

The Illinois Steel Company became the largest steel company in the state. The company also owned a controlling interest in the Chicago, Lake Shore and Eastern Railway, coal mines in West Virginia and Pennsylvania, iron mines in Michigan and Wisconsin, and limestone mines in Indiana. Illinois Steel grew to become one of the largest steel and iron producers in the country by the late 1880s, producing over 1.1 million tons of pig iron and about one million tons of steel. The company specialized in rail track (including rail, fastenings, and steel plates), mineral wool, wire, pig iron, and hydraulic Portland cement. Railroads using Illinois Steel products included the Atchison, Topeka & Santa Fe, Wabash, Chicago & Alton, and Baltimore & Ohio. Pig iron operations were handled in conjunction with Pickands, Brown & Company.

The success of Illinois Steel did not go unchecked. The Carnegie Steel Company had a more efficient operation in Pittsburgh, Pennsylvania and sought to force Illinois Steel into receivership. Carnegie sold steel near Chicago at only eighteen cents a ton, forcing Illinois Steel to sell their products below production cost. The ploy worked and by 1896, Illinois Steel had drawn papers to place the company into receivership. Before these papers could be filed, however, Illinois Steel decided to focus on expanding their market to the west of Chicago, where Carnegie lacked sufficient supply lines. This strategy proved successful.

In 1898, the Illinois Steel Company acquired the Minnesota Iron Company, Lorain Steel Company of Ohio, the Johnson Company of Pennsylvania, and the Elgin, Joliet & Eastern Railway, forming the Federal Steel Company. Upon completion of the merge, general counsel Elbert Henry Gary became president of the company.

In February 1901, Gary worked with J. P. Morgan to have him acquire Carnegie Steel. Days after the acquisition was approved, Gary announced his intent to merge Federal Steel into Carnegie to form what would be known as U.S. Steel. The new company began operations on April 1, 1901.

== Bridges ==
Works include (with variations in attribution):

- Hawkeye Creek Bridge, Hawkeye Rd. over Hawkeye Cr., Mediapolis, Iowa (Illinois Steel Co.), NRHP-listed
- North Skunk River Bridge, Co. Rd. G13 over North Skunk R., New Sharon, Iowa (American Bridge Co., Illinois Steel Co.), NRHP-listed
- Okoboji Bridge, 180th Ave. over branch of Little Sioux R., Milford, Iowa (Illinois Steel Co.), NRHP-listed
- Park Avenue Bridge, Park Ave. over the San Francisco River, Clifton, Arizona (Illinois Steel Co.), NRHP-listed
- Sappa Creek Bridge, Co. Rd. over Sappa Cr., 2 mi. E of Stamford, Stamford, Nebraska (Illinois Steel Co.), NRHP-listed
- Sargent Bridge, Dawson St. over the Middle Loup R., 1 mi. S of Sargent, Sargent, Nebraska (Illinois Steel Co.), NRHP-listed
- State Highway 71 Bridge at the Colorado River, TX 71, .8 mi E of jct. with FM 609, La Grange, Texas (Illinois Steel Bridge Company, et al.), NRHP-listed
- State Highway 78 Bridge at the Red River, OK 78, across the Red River at the OK-TX state line, Ravenna, Texas and Ravenna, Oklahoma (Illinois Steel Bridge Company, et al.), NRHP-listed
- Sweetwater Mill Bridge, Co. Rd. over Mud Cr., Sweetwater, Nebraska (Illinois Steel Co.), NRHP-listed
