= Bridge No. 4 =

Bridge No. 4 may refer to:

- Salmon Bay Bridge, Seattle, Washington, known also as Bridge No. 4
- Bridge No. 4 (La Crosse, Wisconsin), listed on the National Register of Historic Places
