= Joliet Iron and Steel Company =

Joliet Iron and Steel Company was a steel manufacturer located in Joliet, Illinois.

The Union Coal, Iron and Transportation Company was founded in 1869. In 1873, it was reorganized into the Joliet Iron and Steel Company. In 1889 the company became part of Illinois Steel Company.

The Joliet Works of Illinois Steel ceased operations in 1932.
