= Chambers Ford Bridge =

- U.S. National Register of Historic Places
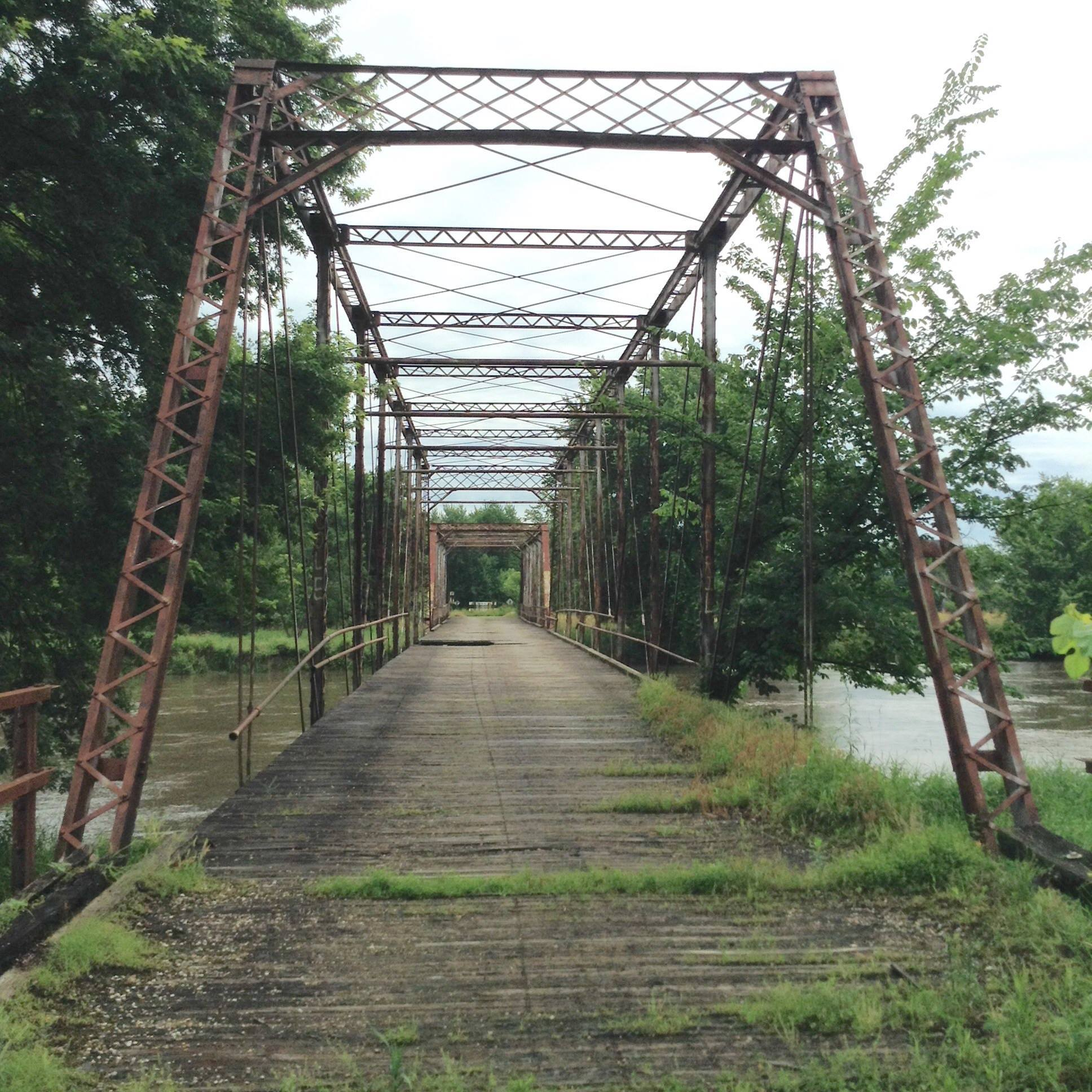

- Location within Iowa Location within the United States
- Location: 385th St. over the Iowa River
- Nearest city: Chelsea, Iowa
- Coordinates: 41°53′01″N 92°20′09″W
- Area: less than one acre
- Built: 1890, 1903
- Built by: Clinton Bridge and Iron Works; George King Bridge Co.
- Architectural style: pinned Pratt through truss
- MPS: Highway Bridges of Iowa MPS
- NRHP reference No.: 98000482
- Added to NRHP: May 15, 1998

The Chambers Ford Bridge is located southeast of Chelsea, Iowa, United States. It spans the Iowa River for 345 feet (105 m). The Tama County Board of Supervisors approved a petition to construct a bridge at Chambers Ford under the condition that the local residents to secure the right-of-way for the bridge, build the trestle work and all approaches to the bridge. The Clinton Bridge and Iron Works of Clinton, Iowa built a single-span, pin-connected Pratt truss in 1890. By the turn of the 20th century the north end of the timber trestle approach that the local citizens constructed deteriorated beyond repair. The county contracted with the George King Bridge Company of Des Moines for $3,987 to build a new Pratt through truss. It was listed on the National Register of Historic Places in 1998. The bridge has been closed since 2007

In 2012 Tama County expressed a desire to replace the bridge. Four years later Tama County let the contract for a replacement span to PCI Construction of Reinbeck, Iowa. After the construction of the new bridge, the historic Chambers Ford Bridge will be removed due to no one bidding on the historic trusses.
