= Little Sioux River Bridge =

- U.S. National Register of Historic Places
- Location within Iowa Location within the United States
- Location: 210th Ave. over the Little Sioux River
- Nearest city: Spencer, Iowa
- Coordinates: 43°09′47″N 95°10′13″W
- Built: 1900-1901
- Built by: Clinton Bridge & Iron Works
- Architectural style: Pennsylvania through truss
- MPS: Highway Bridges of Iowa MPS
- NRHP reference No.: 98000810
- Added to NRHP: June 25, 1998

The Little Sioux River Bridge is a historic structure located northwest of Spencer, Iowa, United States. It spans the Little Sioux River for 180 feet (55 m). The bridge was originally located at Main Street, south of downtown Spencer over the same river. Two previous bridges had been located at the original location beginning in 1875, with a replacement in 1889. Clay County contracted with Clinton Bridge and Iron Works from Clinton, Iowa in 1900 to build this Pennsylvania through truss span. Completed the following year, it is the rare example of this type of bridge built in Iowa. A concrete arch span replaced this bridge in 1915, and it was moved to its current location the same year. The concrete abutments were built by Thor Construction Company from Cedar Falls, Iowa. The bridge was listed on the National Register of Historic Places in 1998.

== See also ==
- List of bridges on the National Register of Historic Places in Iowa
- National Register of Historic Places listings in Clay County, Iowa
