= Upper Iowa River Bridge =

- U.S. National Register of Historic Places
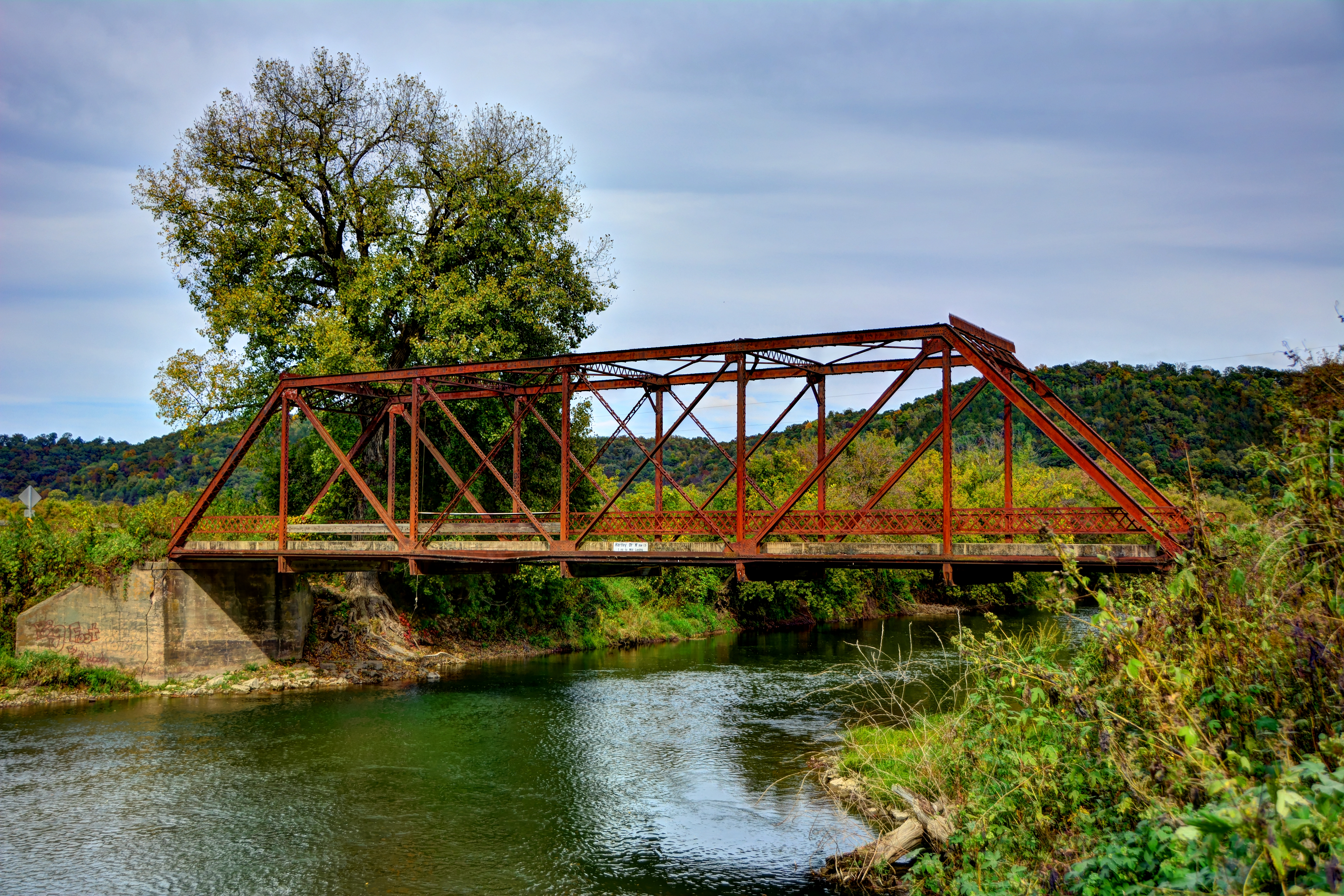

- Location within Iowa Location within the United States
- Location: Mays Prairie Rd. over the Upper Iowa River
- Nearest city: Dorchester, Iowa
- Coordinates: 43°25′57″N 91°24′43″W
- Built: 1914
- Built by: Clinton Bridge and Iron Works; Chambers and Dobson
- Architectural style: Pratt truss
- MPS: Highway Bridges of Iowa MPS
- NRHP reference No.: 98000772
- Added to NRHP: May 15, 1998

The Upper Iowa River Bridge, also known as the Hartley Bridge, is a historic structure located southeast of Dorchester, Iowa, United States. It spans the Upper Iowa River for 122 feet (37 m). Allamakee County built the first permanent bridge at this location around 1870. By the early 1910s it had deteriorated to the point of needing to be replaced, and it was removed in 1913. At the time this was on the main road between Dorchester and New Albin. Chambers and Dobson of New Hampton, Iowa was awarded the $2,585 to build the concrete superstructure. The Clinton Bridge and Iron Works of Clinton, Iowa fabricated and erected the Pratt truss structure for $3,490. It was completed in July 1914, and was one of the last bridges erected in the state before the Iowa State Highway Commission standardize bridge designs for through truss bridges. It was listed on the National Register of Historic Places in 1998.
