= Snider Bridge =

- U.S. National Register of Historic Places
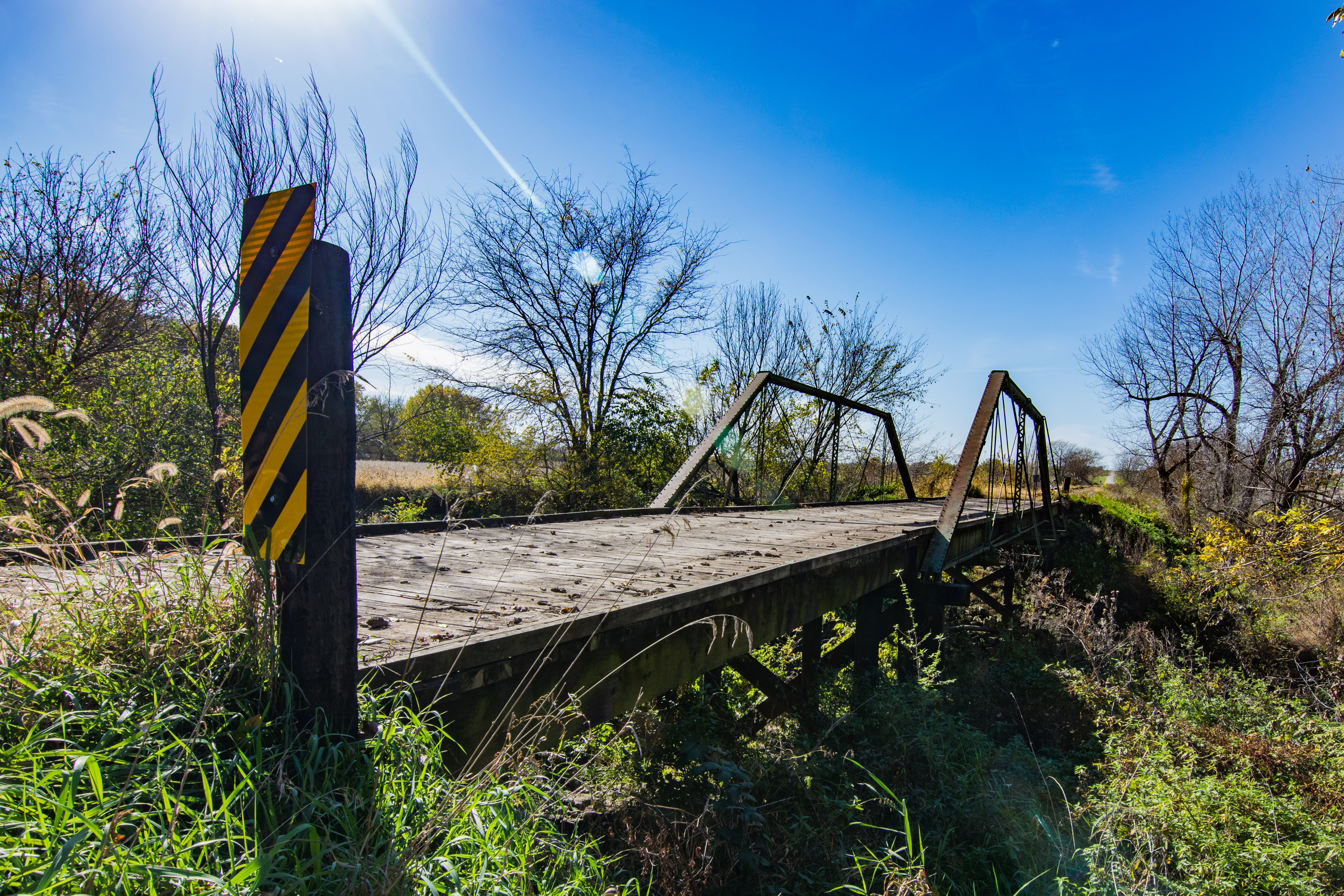

- Location within Iowa Location within the United States
- Location: 220th St. over Kemp Creek
- Nearest city: Corning, Iowa
- Coordinates: 40°59′11″N 94°49′03″W
- Area: less than one acre
- Built: 1885
- Architect: Reeves, Ward & Keeper
- Architectural style: Pinned Pratt pony truss
- MPS: Highway Bridges of Iowa MPS
- NRHP reference No.: 98000774
- Added to NRHP: June 25, 1998

The Snider Bridge is located west of Corning, Iowa, United States. It spans Kemp Creek for 119 feet (36 m). In June 1885 the Adams County Board of Supervisors received 17 petitions for new bridges, including one from George Snider. The board decided to erect iron bridges for the longest two spans, including this one. They awarded a contract for both bridges to Reeve, Ward and Keepers of Clinton, Iowa for $1,451.00. This span was completed later in the year. The pinned Pratt pony truss continues to carry traffic on the gravel road over the creek. It was listed on the National Register of Historic Places in 1998.
