= Bridgeport Bridge (Denmark, Iowa) =

- U.S. National Register of Historic Places
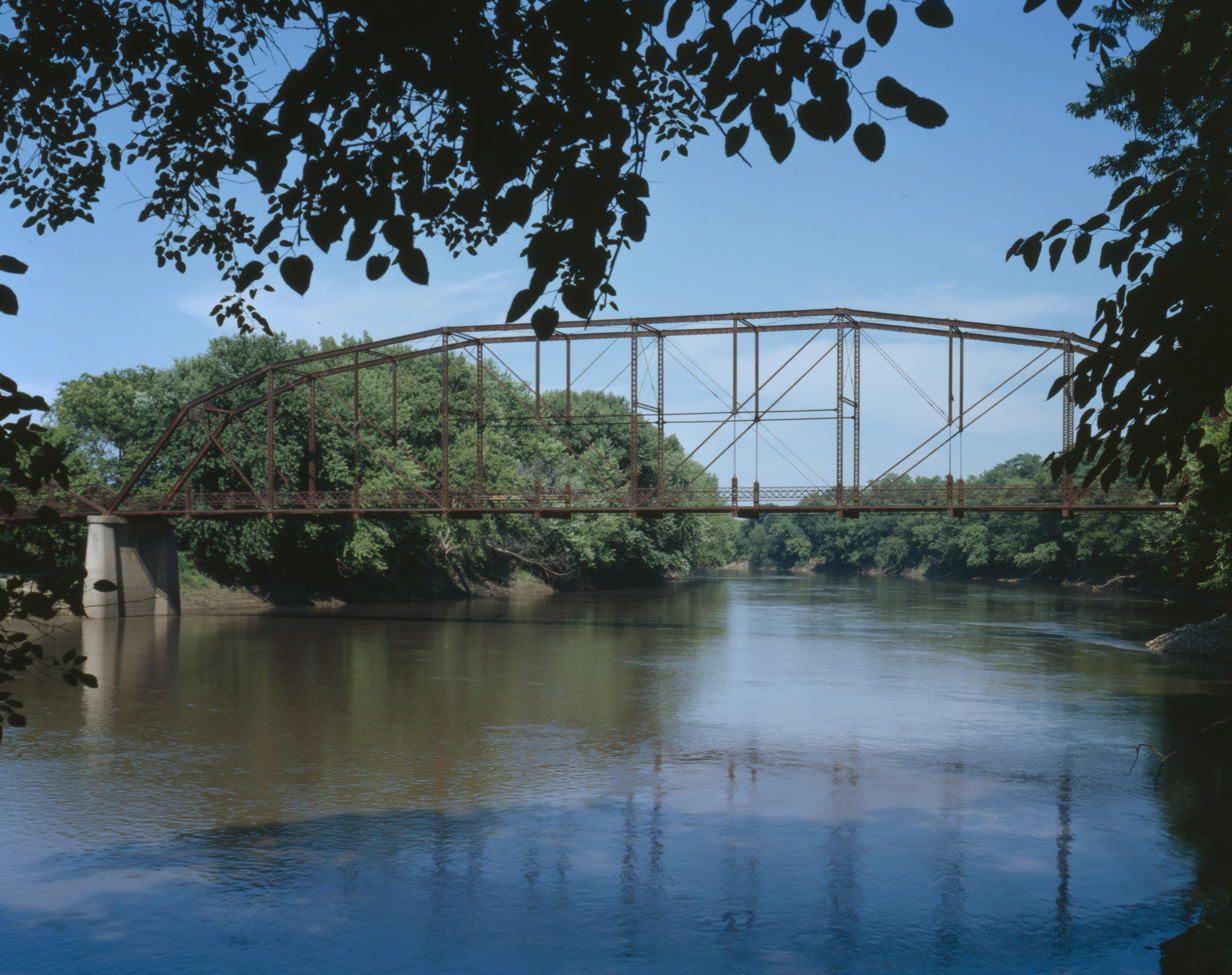

- Location within Iowa Location within the United States
- Location: Old Quarry Road
- Nearest city: Denmark, Iowa
- Coordinates: 40°47′25″N 91°21′50″W
- Area: less than one acre
- Built: 1904
- Architect: Clinton Bridge and Iron Works
- Architectural style: Pennsylvania through truss
- MPS: Highway Bridges of Iowa MPS
- NRHP reference No.: 98000533
- Added to NRHP: May 15, 1998

The Bridgeport Bridge was a historic structure located near Denmark, Iowa, United States. This span was a replacement bridge for the original structure whose middle stone pier was deteriorating. The weaknesses in the old bridge were noted in 1887 and 1893. Both Des Moines and Lee counties financed the $5,110 construction of this bridge, which spanned the Skunk River between the two counties. The 240-foot-long (73 m) Pennsylvania truss bridge was built in 1904 by the Clinton Bridge and Iron Works of Clinton, Iowa. It carried local traffic for nearly 90 years before it was closed.

On February 27, 2024, the south abutment collapsed. The bridge was demolished over the next three weeks. It had the distinction of being the longest pin-connected truss bridge remaining in Iowa. The Bridgeport Bridge was listed on the National Register of Historic Places in 1998.

== See also ==
- List of bridges documented by the Historic American Engineering Record in Iowa
