= Okoboji Bridge =

- U.S. National Register of Historic Places
- Location within Iowa Location within the United States
- Location: 180th Ave. over a branch of the Little Sioux River
- Nearest city: Milford, Iowa
- Coordinates: 43°15′39″N 95°13′46″W
- Area: less than one acre
- Built: 1909
- Built by: Clinton Bridge and Iron Works
- Architectural style: Pratt/Warren pony truss
- MPS: Highway Bridges of Iowa MPS
- NRHP reference No.: 98000789
- Added to NRHP: June 25, 1998

The Okoboji Bridge is located southwest of Milford, Iowa, United States. The 83-foot (25 m) span carried traffic on 180th Avenue over a branch of the Little Sioux River. The Dickinson County Board of Supervisors hired a local contractor to build a bridge across the straits between East and West Okoboji Lakes in 1859. The wooden structures had to be rebuilt in 1874–1875. There was a desire for a drawbridge at this point to allow for steamboats to navigate between the lakes. Three different swing spans were built at this location in the 19th century. When the third span deteriorated the board of supervisors contracted with the Clinton Bridge and Iron Works of Clinton, Iowa to build a permanent span here in June 1909. The Pratt/Warren pony truss structure was completed later that year for $1,550. The bridge and the road were incorporated into the U.S. Highway System, and it was placed under the aegis of the Iowa State Highway Commission. In 1929 it was replaced with a fixed-span concrete girder structure. At that time the 1909 truss span was moved to Okoboji Township to span a branch of the Little Sioux River. It was listed on the National Register of Historic Places in 1998. The span has subsequently been abandoned.
