= Berkhimer Bridge =

- U.S. National Register of Historic Places
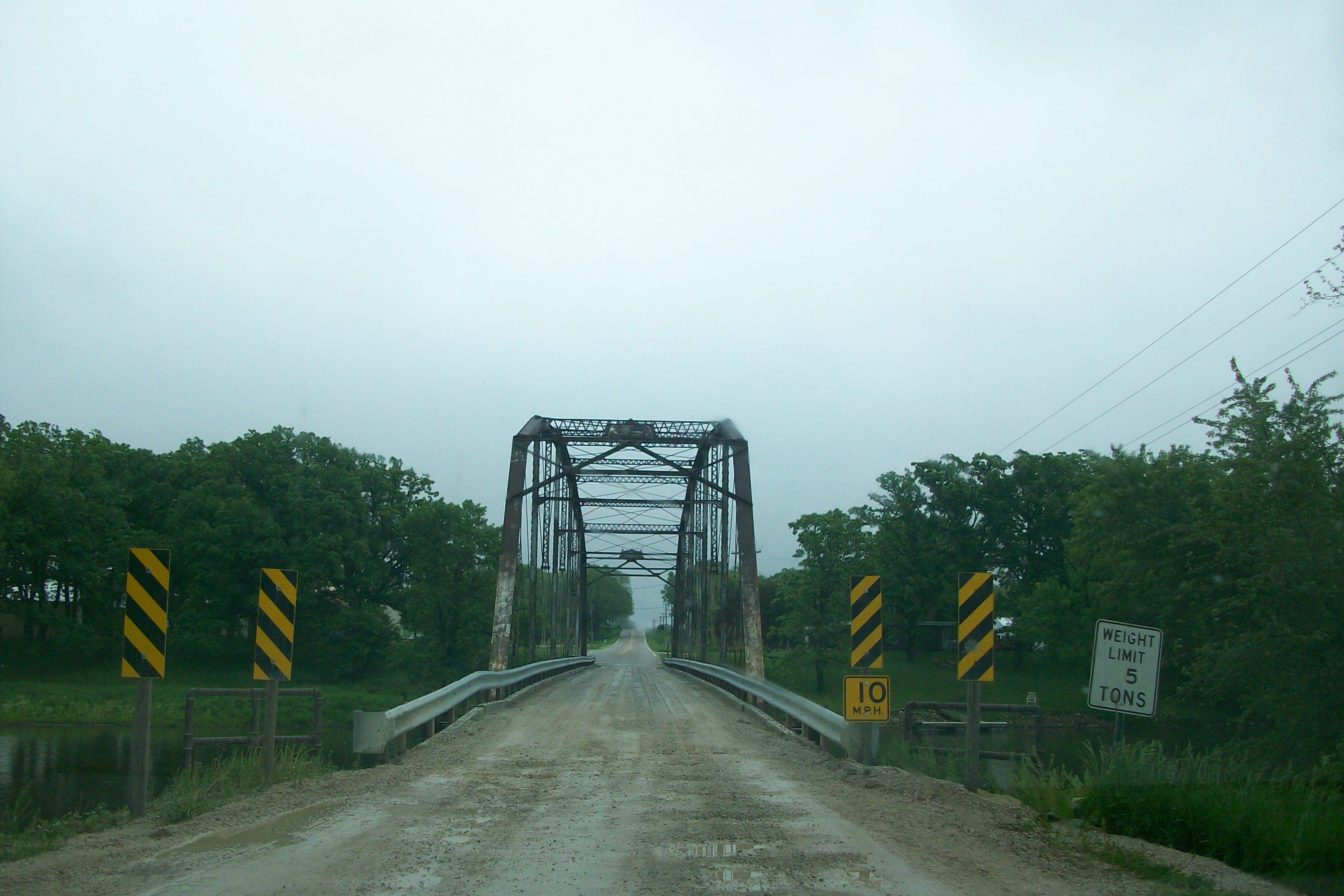
- Facing east

- Location within Iowa Location within the United States
- Nearest city: Humboldt, Iowa
- Coordinates: 42°44′21″N 94°15′11″W
- Built: 1899
- Architect: Clinton Bridge & Iron Works
- Architectural style: Pin-connected, 10-panel Pennsylvania through truss
- MPS: Highway Bridges of Iowa
- NRHP reference No.: 98000523
- Added to NRHP: May 15, 1998

Berkhimer Bridge is a high truss bridge built in 1899 located near Humboldt, Iowa. It spans the Des Moines River for 253.0 feet (77.1 m).

== Status ==
Humboldt County Engineer Paul Jacobson speculated that Berkhimer Bridge may be closed due to an increase in traffic on the route. This is because the bridge is being used as an unofficial detour while work is being done on Highway 3 west of Humboldt. The bridge was closed on June 1 due to the stated concerns.

It was closed in 2001 and rehabilitated in 2005.
