= Red Bridge (Monroe, Iowa) =

- U.S. National Register of Historic Places
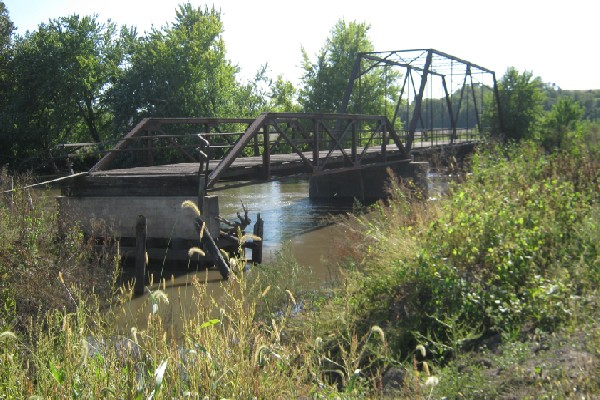

- Location within Iowa Location within the United States
- Location: County Road S74 over the South Skunk River
- Nearest city: Monroe, Iowa
- Coordinates: 41°32′28″N 93°01′15″W
- Area: less than one acre
- Built: 1892
- Built by: H.S. Efnor
- Architectural style: Warren through truss Warren pony truss
- MPS: Highway Bridges of Iowa MPS
- NRHP reference No.: 98000521
- Added to NRHP: May 15, 1998

The Red Bridge is located just northeast of Monroe, Iowa, United States. The 212-foot (65 m) span carried traffic on County Road S74 over the South Skunk River. This is one of the few Warren truss bridges built in Iowa in the 19th century. Local bridge contractor H.S. Efnor built the main span for $3,515.34 in 1892. It received considerable damage in a 1947 flood, and the county replaced one of its steel cylinder piers with a concrete pier, and added the pony truss approach span on the north side. It has subsequently been closed to traffic. The bridge was listed on the National Register of Historic Places in 1998.
