= Bridge No. 4 (La Crosse, Wisconsin) =

- U.S. National Register of Historic Places
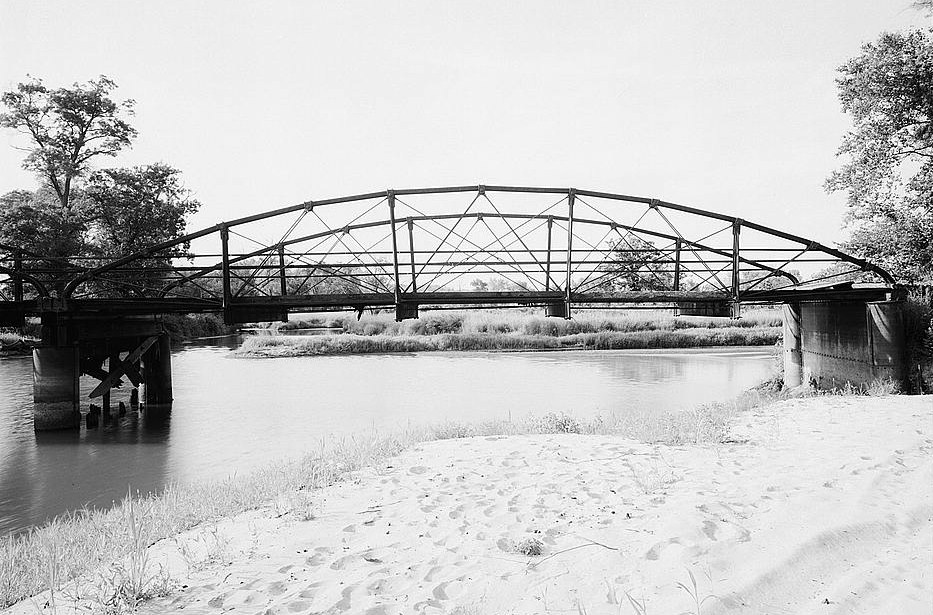

- Location within Wisconsin Location within the United States
- Nearest city: La Crosse, Wisconsin
- Coordinates: 44°1′24″N 91°19′14″W
- Area: 0.7 acres (0.28 ha)
- Built: 1902
- Built by: Clinton Bridge Company
- Architectural style: Bowstring truss bridge
- MPS: Van Loon Wildlife Area Truss Bridge TR
- NRHP reference No.: 80000149
- Added to NRHP: February 27, 1980

Bridge No. 4, near La Crosse, Wisconsin, United States, was built in 1902. It is a bowstring truss bridge built by the Clinton Bridge Company. It was listed on the National Register of Historic Places in 1980 and documented by the Historic American Engineering Record in 1987.

The bridge is one of seven built during 1891-92 by the Clinton Bridge Company, of Clinton, Iowa, to bring a La Crosse County road through backwaters of the Black River and then cross the Black River itself, connecting the city of La Crosse with rural Trempealeau County. All seven were bowstring truss bridges, but one was replaced by a kingpost truss bridge nine years after being damaged in 1911. The kingpost truss and all but the main bridge spanning the Black River itself survived in 1979.

The Black River had previously been crossed by a ferry started by Alex McGilvray in 1861.

The bridge consists of two spans, and is 17 feet (5.2 m) wide and 131 feet (40 m) long. It has a concrete deck. Its steel was from the Jones and Laughlin Steel Company. The tension members of the bridge "are a combination of round and square eye-bars with the eyes made by looping over and welding the end of the bar."

== See also ==
- List of bridges documented by the Historic American Engineering Record in Wisconsin
