= Tracy, Iowa =

- Unincorporated community
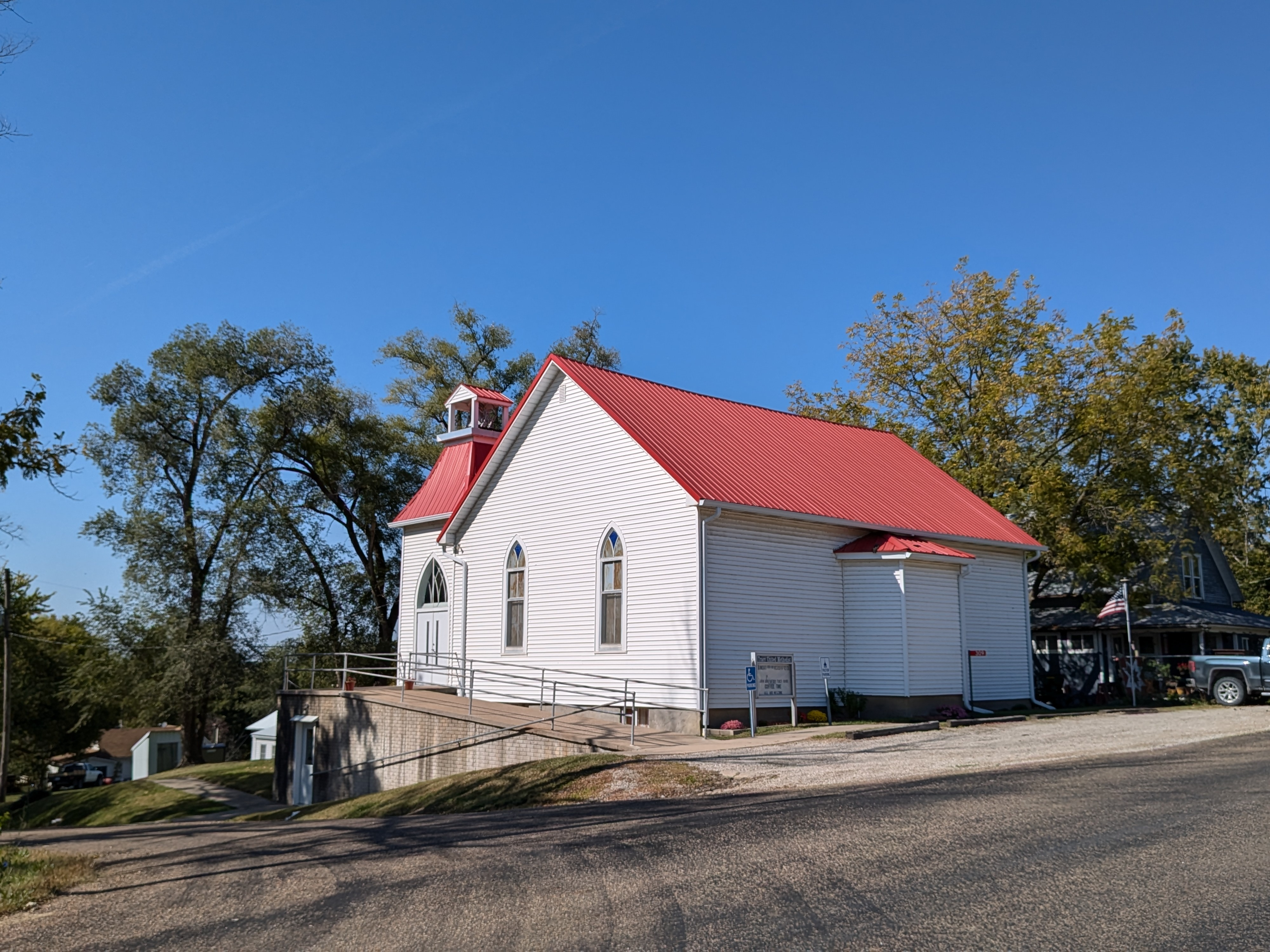
- Tracy United Methodist Church

- Location within Iowa Location within the United States
- Coordinates: 41°16′35″N 92°52′32″W
- Country: United States
- State: Iowa
- County: Marion
- Elevation: 784 ft (239 m)
- Time zone: UTC-6 (Central (CST))
  - Summer (DST): UTC-5 (CDT)
- ZIP codes: 50256
- GNIS feature ID: 463551

Tracy is an unincorporated community in eastern Marion County, Iowa, United States. It lies along local roads east of the city of Knoxville, the county seat of Marion County. Its elevation is 784 feet (239 m). Although Tracy is unincorporated, it has a post office with the ZIP code of 50256, which opened on 31 January 1876.

== History ==
Tracy was laid out in October 1875 by Capt. Alexander F. Tracy and S. Merrill. The population was 375 in 1940.

== Education ==
The Twin Cedars Community School District operates local public schools.
