= Hawkeye Creek Bridge =

- U.S. National Register of Historic Places
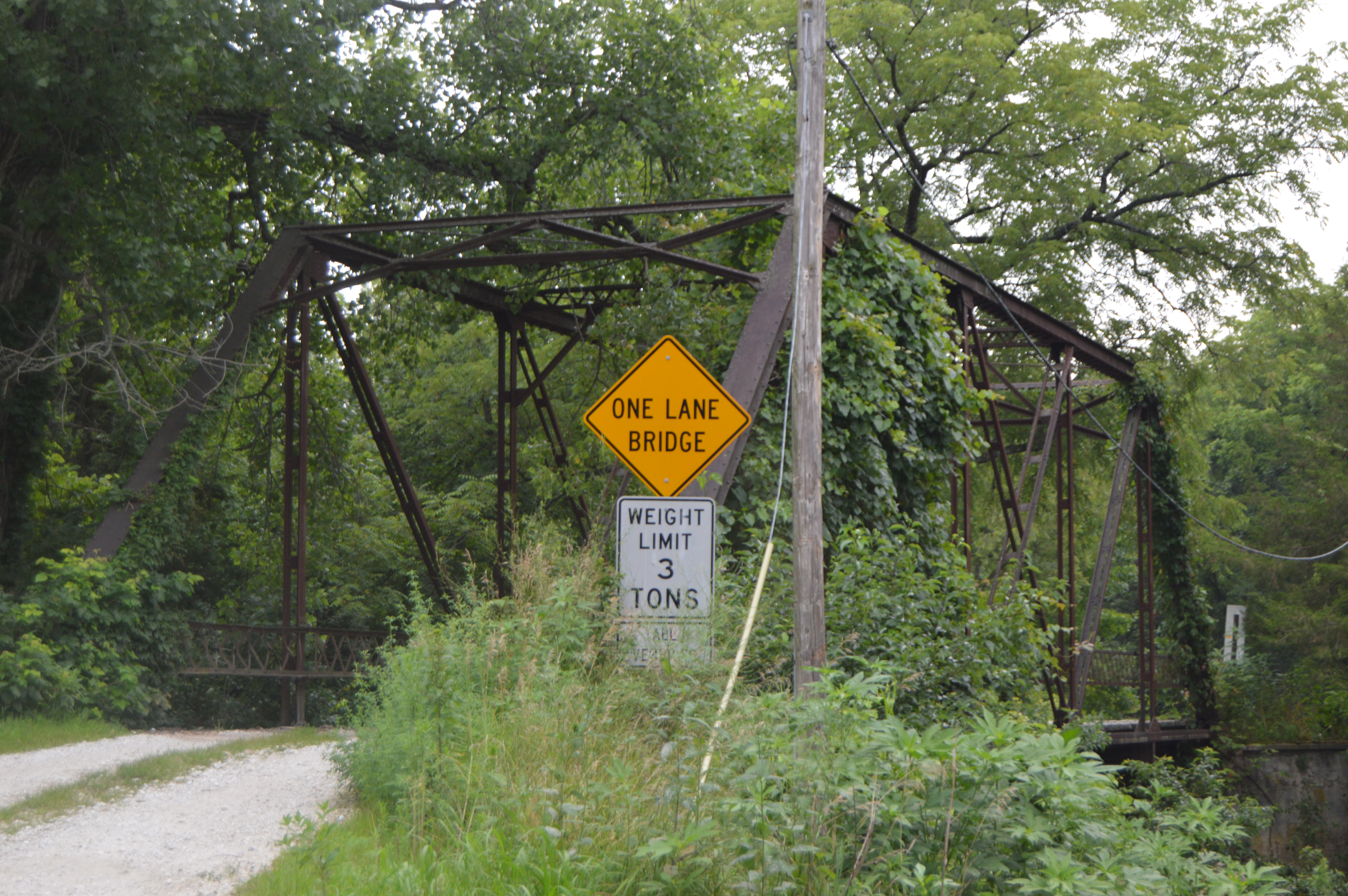

- Location within Iowa Location within the United States
- Location: Hawkeye Rd. over Hawkeye Creek
- Nearest city: Mediapolis, Iowa
- Coordinates: 41°02′33″N 91°03′26″W
- Area: less than one acre
- Built: 1909-1910
- Built by: Clinton Bridge and Iron Works
- Architectural style: Pratt through truss
- NRHP reference No.: 98000790
- Added to NRHP: June 25, 1998

Hawkeye Creek Bridge is a historic structure located in a rural area northeast of Mediapolis, Iowa, United States. The Des Moines County Board of Supervisors contracted with Clinton Bridge and Iron Works on September 23, 1909, to design and build this bridge. It is an 80-foot (24 m) span that carries traffic of a gravel road over Hawkeye Creek. The structure is a single rigid-connected Pratt through truss that is supported by concrete abutments. It basically remains in an unaltered condition. The bridge was listed on the National Register of Historic Places in 1998.
