= National Register of Historic Places listings in Iowa =

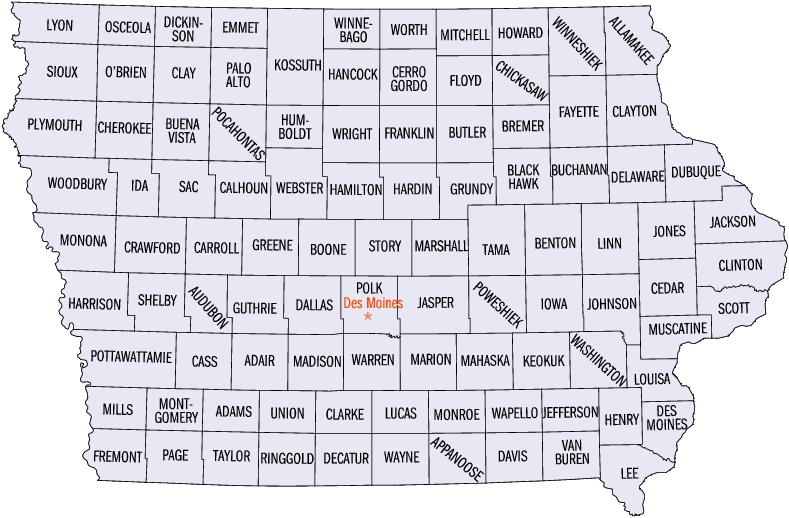
Iowa counties (clickable)

This is a list of properties and historic districts in Iowa that are listed on the National Register of Historic Places. There are listings in all of Iowa's 99 counties, adding up to over 2,300 total.

Contents: Counties in Iowa (links in italic lead to a new page)
Adair | Adams | Allamakee | Appanoose | Audubon | Benton | Black Hawk | Boone | Bremer | Buchanan | Buena Vista | Butler | Calhoun | Carroll | Cass | Cedar | Cerro Gordo | Cherokee | Chickasaw | Clarke | Clay | Clayton | Clinton | Crawford | Dallas | Davis | Decatur | Delaware | Des Moines | Dickinson | Dubuque | Emmet | Fayette | Floyd | Franklin | Fremont | Greene | Grundy | Guthrie | Hamilton | Hancock | Hardin | Harrison | Henry | Howard | Humboldt | Ida | Iowa | Jackson | Jasper | Jefferson | Johnson | Jones | Keokuk | Kossuth | Lee | Linn | Louisa | Lucas | Lyon | Madison | Mahaska | Marion | Marshall | Mills | Mitchell | Monona | Monroe | Montgomery | Muscatine | O'Brien | Osceola | Page | Palo Alto | Plymouth | Pocahontas | Polk | Pottawattamie | Poweshiek | Ringgold | Sac | Scott | Shelby | Sioux | Story | Tama | Taylor | Union | Van Buren | Wapello | Warren | Washington | Wayne | Webster | Winnebago | Winneshiek | Woodbury | Worth | Wright

This National Park Service list is complete through NPS recent listings posted October 16, 2026.

== Current listings by county ==
The following are approximate tallies of current listings by county. These counts are based on entries in the National Register Information Database as of April 24, 2008 and new weekly listings posted since then on the National Register of Historic Places web site. There are frequent additions to the listings and occasional delistings and the counts here are approximate and not official. New entries are added to the official Register on a weekly basis. Also, the counts in this table exclude boundary increase and decrease listings which modify the area covered by an existing property or district and which carry a separate National Register reference number. The numbers of NRHP listings in each county are documented by tables in each of the individual county list-articles.

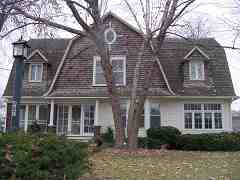
Phil Hoffman House, in Mahaska County

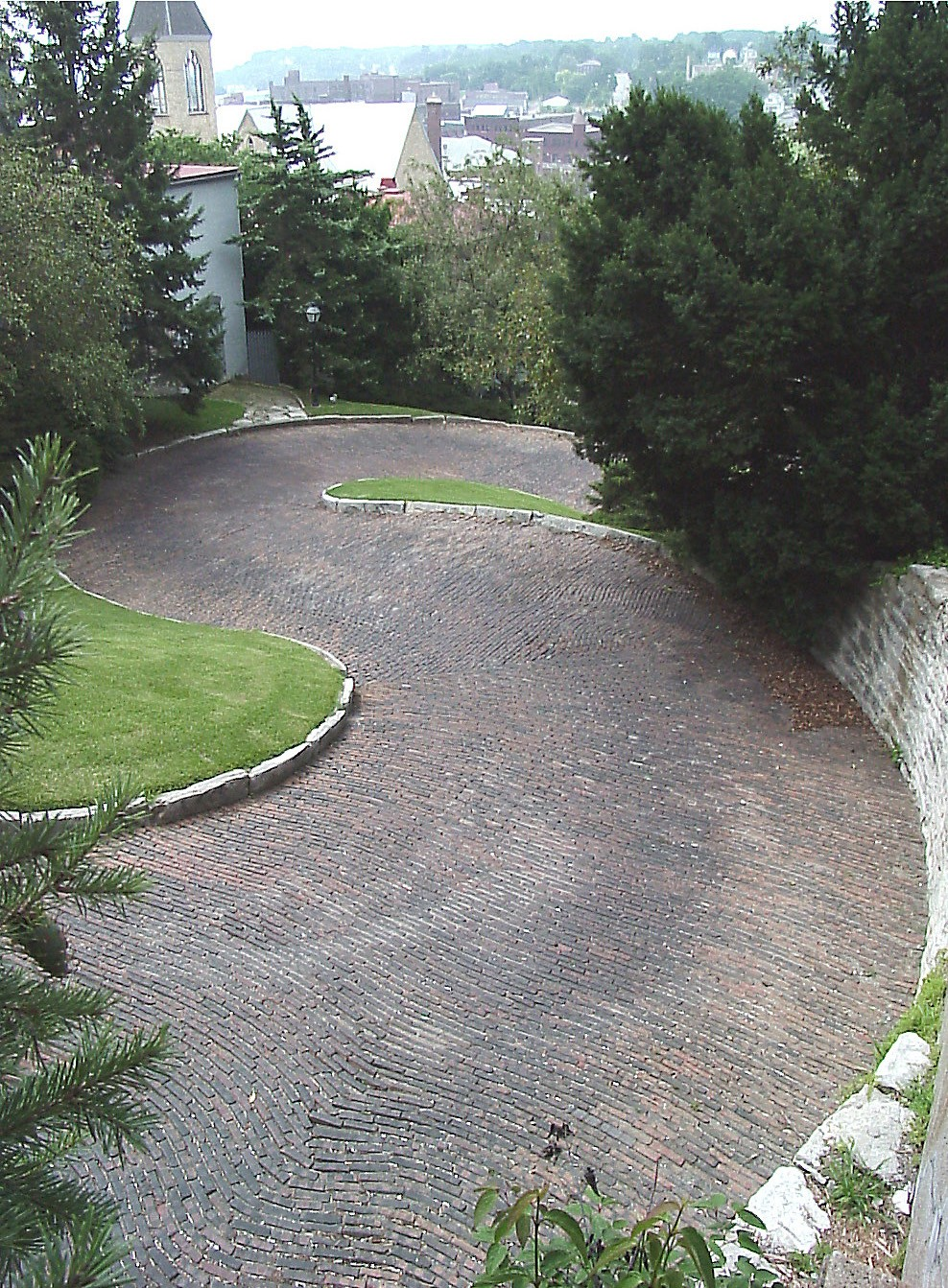
Snake Alley, in Des Moines County

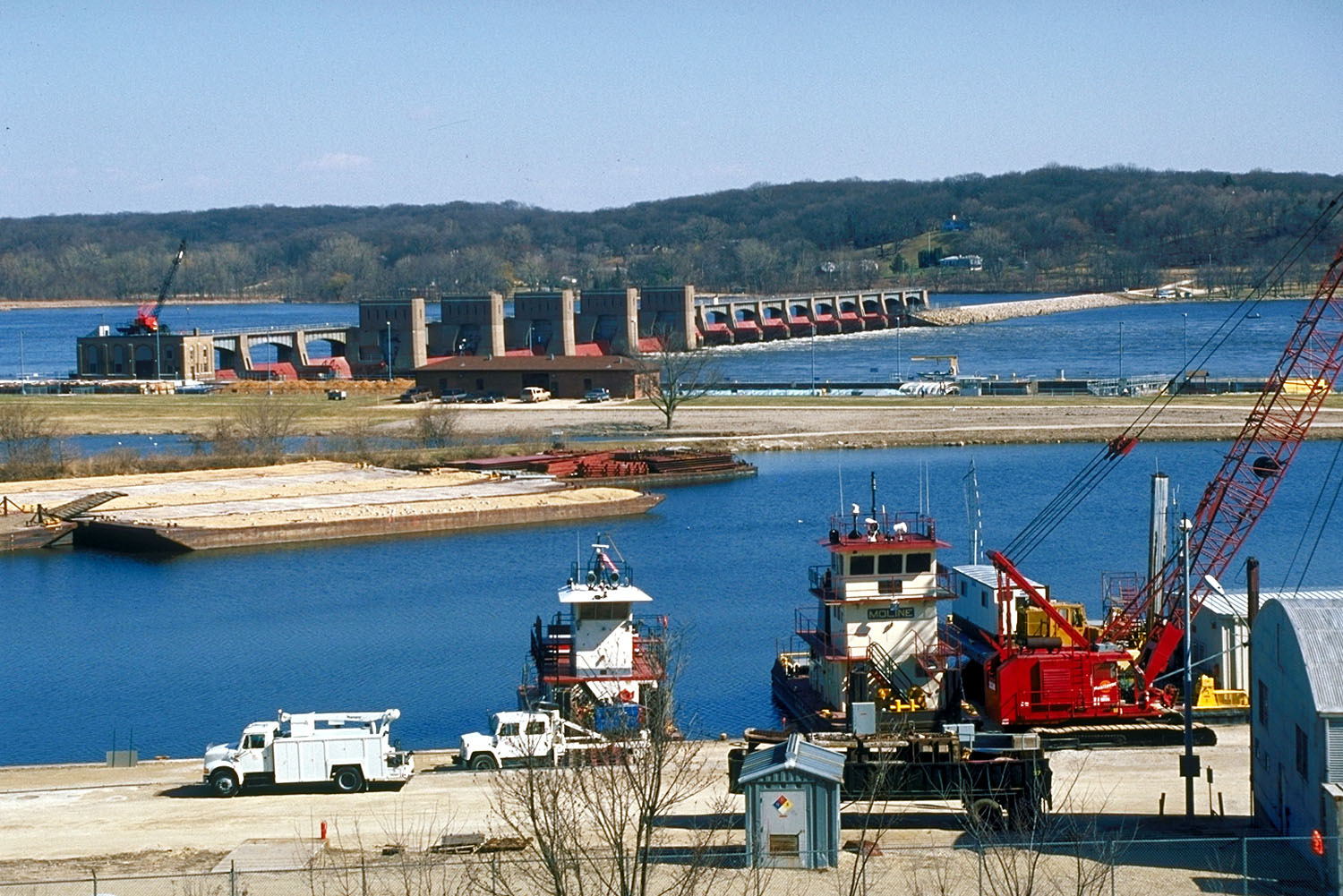
Lock and Dam No. 14 Historic District, in Scott County

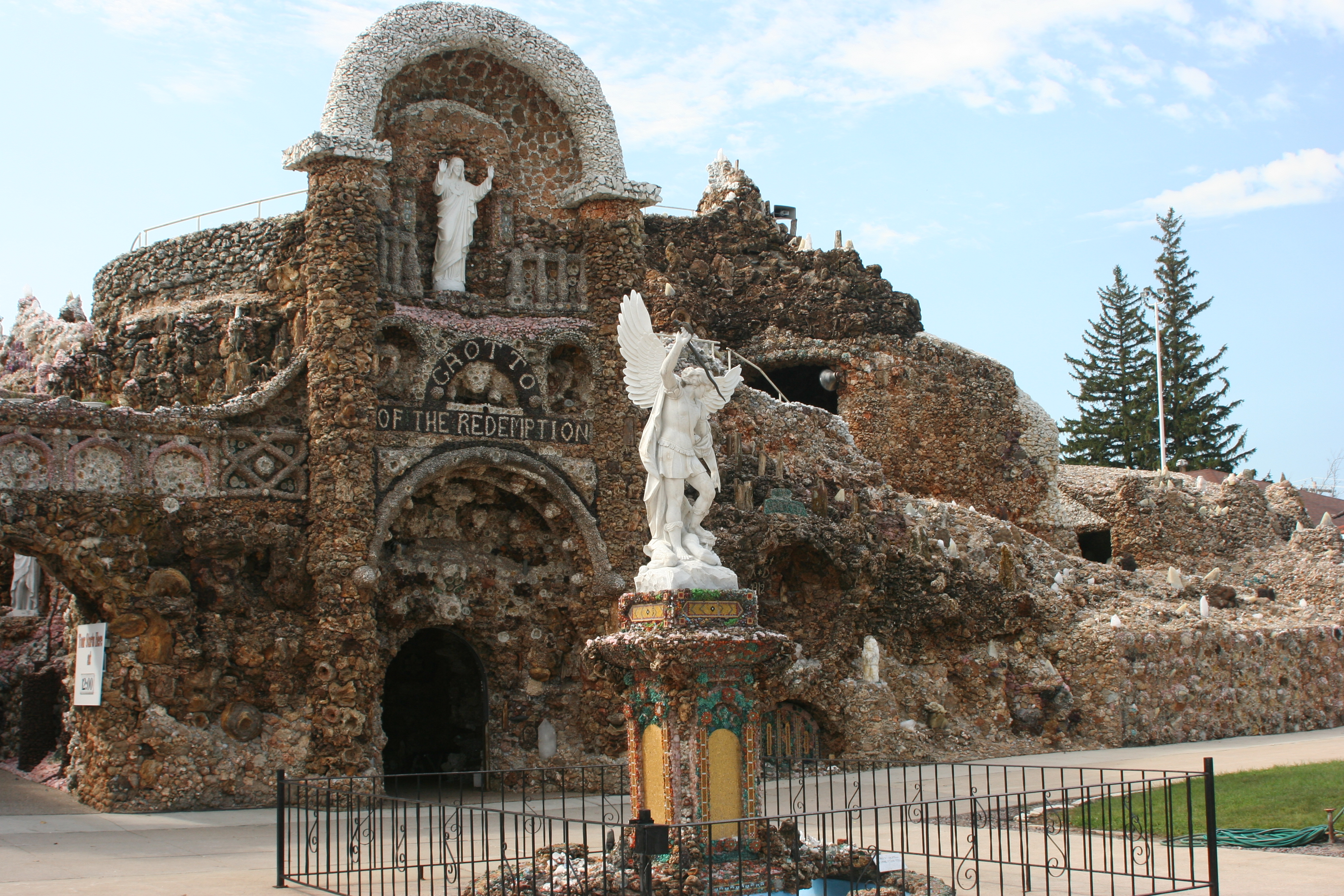
Grotto of the Redemption, in Palo Alto County

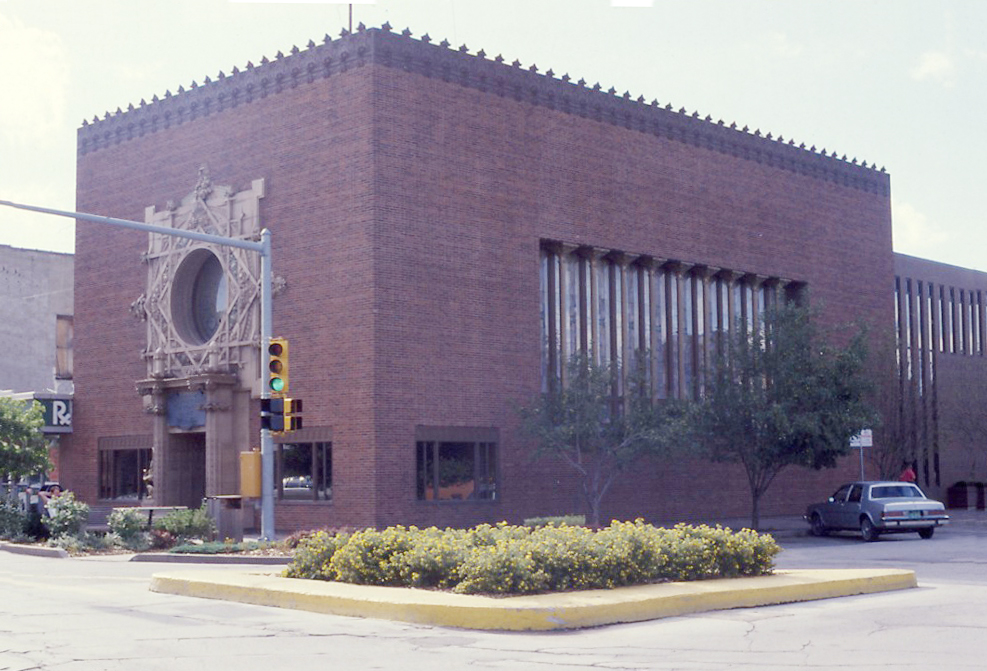
Merchants' National Bank in Poweshiek County, designed by Louis Sullivan

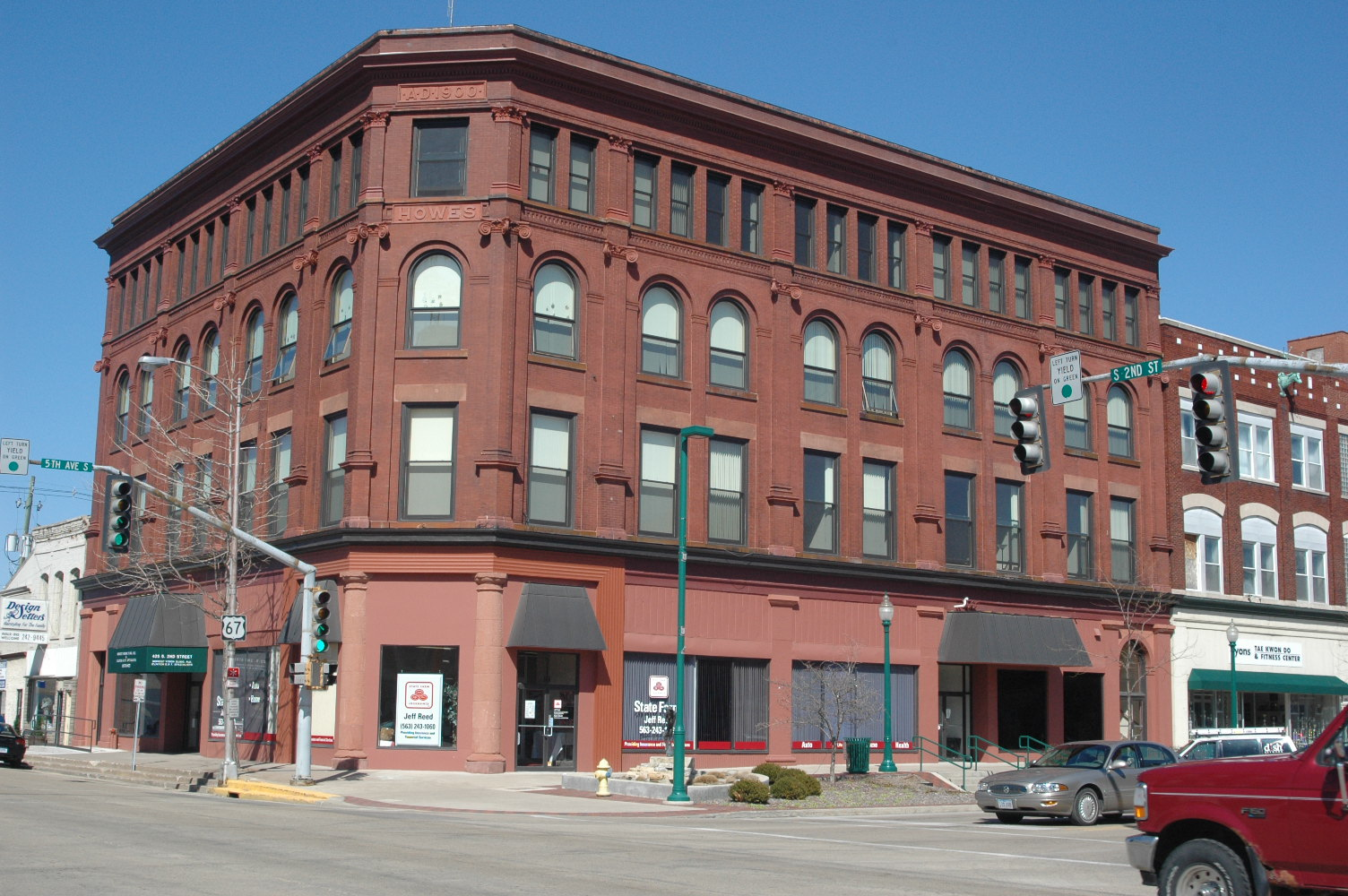
Howes Building, in Clinton County

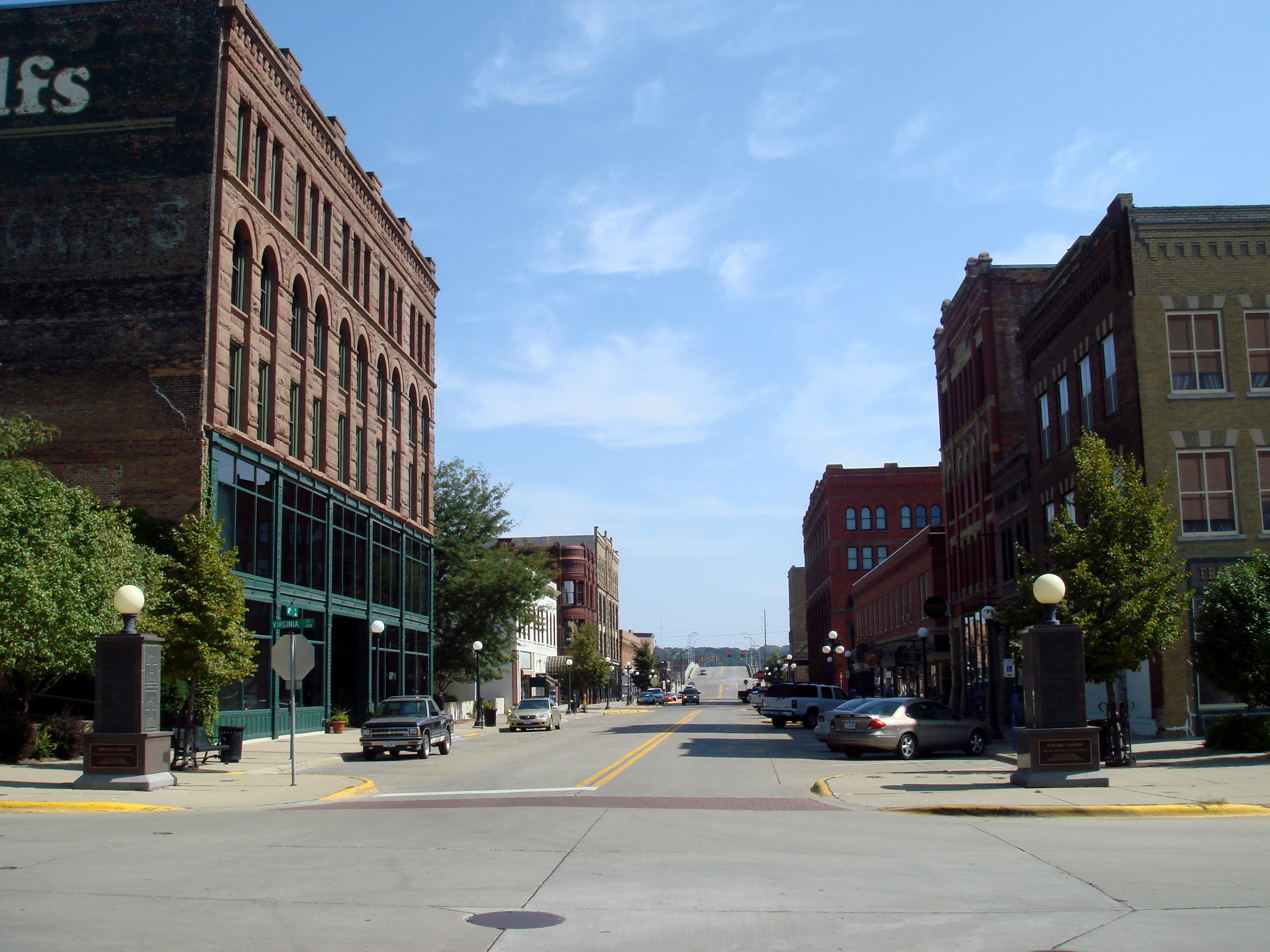
Fourth Street Historic District, in Woodbury County

	County	# of Sites
1	Adair	10
2	Adams	4
3	Allamakee	22
4	Appanoose	13
5	Audubon	15
6	Benton	16
7	Black Hawk	50
8	Boone	18
9	Bremer	12
10	Buchanan	20
11	Buena Vista	11
12	Butler	7
13	Calhoun	13
14	Carroll	18
15	Cass	11
16	Cedar	18
17	Cerro Gordo	47
18	Cherokee	13
19	Chickasaw	3
20	Clarke	8
21	Clay	9
22	Clayton	55
23	Clinton	32
24	Crawford	13
25	Dallas	18
26	Davis	12
27	Decatur	7
28	Delaware	14
29	Des Moines	36
30	Dickinson	12
31	Dubuque	85
32	Emmet	3
33	Fayette	29
34	Floyd	20
35	Franklin	12
36	Fremont	9
37	Greene	17
38	Grundy	3
39	Guthrie	8
40	Hamilton	8
41	Hancock	9
42	Hardin	35
43	Harrison	13
44	Henry	53
45	Howard	7
46	Humboldt	6
47	Ida	5
48	Iowa	11
49	Jackson	76
50	Jasper	18
51	Jefferson	29
52	Johnson	97
53	Jones	29
54	Keokuk	10
55	Kossuth	6
56	Lee	48
57	Linn	125
58	Louisa	10
59	Lucas	16
60	Lyon	10
61	Madison	55
62	Mahaska	49
63	Marion	29
64	Marshall	19
65	Mills	7
66	Mitchell	11
67	Monona	11
68	Monroe	11
69	Montgomery	19
70	Muscatine	40
71	O'Brien	3
72	Osceola	1
73	Page	9
74	Palo Alto	4
75	Plymouth	11
76	Pocahontas	3
77.1	Polk: Des Moines	190
77.2	Polk: Other	15
77.3	Polk: Total	205
78	Pottawattamie	42
79	Poweshiek	25
80	Ringgold	5
81	Sac	13
82.1	Scott: Davenport: Downtown	57
82.2	Scott: Davenport: East	91
82.3	Scott: Davenport: West	110
82.4	Scott: Davenport: Duplicates	(2)
82.5	Scott: Other	31
82.6	Scott: Total	287
83	Shelby	13
84	Sioux	4
85	Story	38
86	Tama	13
87	Taylor	7
88	Union	6
89	Van Buren	20
90	Wapello	31
91	Warren	11
92	Washington	19
93	Wayne	4
94	Webster	16
95	Winnebago	3
96	Winneshiek	34
97	Woodbury	63
98	Worth	6
99	Wright	8
(duplicates)		(4)
Total:		2,494

== Adams County ==
	Name on the Register	Image	Date listed	Location	City or town	Description
1	Adams County Jail	Adams County Jail	February 28, 1991 (#91000119)	1000 Benton Ave. 40°59′32″N 94°44′04″W	Corning	
2	Corning Commercial Historic District	Corning Commercial Historic District	May 31, 2012 (#12000318)	513-824 Davis Ave., 701-829 Benton Ave. & cross streets 40°59′21″N 94°44′05″W	Corning	
3	Corning Opera House	Corning Opera House	September 21, 1993 (#93000954)	800 Davis Ave. 40°59′25″N 94°44′01″W	Corning	
4	Snider Bridge	Snider Bridge	June 25, 1998 (#98000774)	220th St. over an unnamed stream 40°59′28″N 94°36′38″W	Corning	

=== Former listing ===
	Name on the Register	Image	Date listed	Date removed	Location	City or town	Description
1	Noah Odell House	Noah Odell House	November 30, 2000 (#00000917)	January 24, 2022	1245 240th St. 40°57′35″N 94°50′45″W	Nodaway	

== Butler County ==
	Name on the Register	Image	Date listed	Location	City or town	Description
1	Cherry Street Bridge	Cherry Street Bridge	June 25, 1998 (#98000753)	Cherry St. over a tributary of the Shell Rock River; 42°42′28″N 92°35′08″W	Shell Rock	
2	Coldwater Church of the Brethren		July 13, 1979 (#79000883)	100 block of N. High St. 42°53′31″N 92°48′32″W	Greene	
3	Charles H. & Theresa H. McBride Bungalow	Charles H. & Theresa H. McBride Bungalow	February 7, 2011 (#10001205)	127 E. Adair St. 42°53′31″N 92°48′32″W	Shell Rock	
4	Netcott-Pfeiffer House		April 24, 2007 (#07000347)	206 Buswell St. 42°34′43″N 92°47′28″W	Parkersburg	
5	Renke and Wubke Renken House		January 15, 2014 (#13001075)	401 Coates St. 42°34′38″N 92°47′20″W	Parkersburg	
6	Shell Rock Bridge	Shell Rock Bridge	March 12, 1999 (#99000307)	Cherry St. over the Shell Rock River; 42°42′40″N 92°34′53″W	Shell Rock	
7	Charles Wolf House		October 1, 1979 (#79000884)	401 5th St. 42°34′32″N 92°47′17″W	Parkersburg	

== Chickasaw County ==
	Name on the Register	Image	Date listed	Location	City or town	Description
1	Chickasaw County Courthouse	Chickasaw County Courthouse	July 2, 1981 (#81000228)	Prospect St. at Locust Ave. 43°09′36″N 92°18′49″W	New Hampton	
2	Chickasaw Octagon House		July 17, 1979 (#79000888)	Court St. 43°02′11″N 92°29′58″W	Chickasaw Township	
3	John Foley House		April 16, 1979 (#79000889)	511 N. Locust St. 43°03′52″N 92°18′49″W	New Hampton	

=== Former listing ===
	Name on the Register	Image	Date listed	Date removed	Location	City or town	Description
1	George Darrow Round Barn		June 30, 1986 (#86001421)	September 8, 2022	County Road T76; 43°09′52″N 92°29′46″W	Alta Vista	

== Clarke County ==
	Name on the Register	Image	Date listed	Location	City or town	Description
1	J.V. Banta House	J.V. Banta House	July 14, 1983 (#83000348)	222 McLane St. 41°01′49″N 93°46′08″W	Osceola	
2	Chicago, Burlington and Quincy Depot	Chicago, Burlington and Quincy Depot	January 8, 2009 (#08001283)	215 N. Main St. 41°02′12″N 93°45′56″W	Osceola	Part of the Advent & Development of Railroads in Iowa Multiple Property Submission
3	George H. and Alice Spaulding Cowles House	George H. and Alice Spaulding Cowles House	December 20, 2006 (#06001161)	229 W. Cass St. 41°02′03″N 93°46′09″W	Osceola	
4	John and Mary Jane Kyte Farmstead District	John and Mary Jane Kyte Farmstead District	September 14, 2000 (#00001074)	2875 Mormon Trail Rd. 40°56′09″N 93°39′22″W	Weldon	
5	Osceola Masonic Block	Osceola Masonic Block	July 6, 2010 (#10000421)	101-103 South Main St. 41°02′05″N 93°45′55″W	Osceola	
6	Marcellus Luther and Julia Protzman Temple House	Marcellus Luther and Julia Protzman Temple House	April 4, 1996 (#96000361)	502 S. Main St. 41°01′46″N 93°45′57″W	Osceola	
7	Osceola Commercial Historic District	Osceola Commercial Historic District	January 19, 2018 (#100001971)	S Fillmore, N & S Main, E & W Jefferson & E & W Washington Sts. 41°02′04″N 93°45′59″W	Osceola	
8	Dickinson Webster House	Dickinson Webster House	July 20, 1977 (#77000501)	609 W. Jefferson St. 41°02′12″N 93°46′02″W	Osceola	

=== Former listing ===
	Name on the Register	Image	Date listed	Date removed	Location	City or town	Description
1	Brady-Bolibaugh House		January 3, 1985 (#85000003)	May 12, 2009	217 W. Washington; 41°02′12″N 93°45′45″W	Osceola	Demolished in 2008

== Decatur County ==
	Name on the Register	Image	Date listed	Location	City or town	Description
1	Decatur County Courthouse	Decatur County Courthouse	July 2, 1981 (#81000233)	9th St. 40°44′26″N 93°44′46″W	Leon	
2	Grand River Bridge	Grand River Bridge	June 25, 1998 (#98000794)	County road over the Grand River; 40°43′18″N 93°52′33″W	Leon	
3	Liberty Hall	Liberty Hall	September 29, 1983 (#83000350)	Main St. 40°37′30″N 93°57′07″W	Lamoni	
4	J.J. McClung House	J.J. McClung House	December 6, 1990 (#90001856)	Junction of Main and Vine Sts. 40°49′38″N 93°36′36″W	Garden Grove	
5	Missouri, Iowa & Nebraska Railway Co. Depot-Weldon	Missouri, Iowa & Nebraska Railway Co. Depot-Weldon	December 13, 1991 (#91001827)	N. Main St. at the Decatur County line 40°53′57″N 93°44′01″W	Weldon	
6	C.S. Stearns House	C.S. Stearns House	November 28, 1978 (#78001214)	Main St. 40°49′36″N 93°36′10″W	Garden Grove	
7	Union Church	Union Church	December 12, 1976 (#76000759)	Clark at Sycamore St. 40°38′21″N 93°48′23″W	Davis City	

== Emmet County ==
	Name on the Register	Image	Date listed	Location	City or town	Description
1	Brugjeld-Peterson Family Farmstead District	Brugjeld-Peterson Family Farmstead District	April 6, 2000 (#00000326)	2349 450th Ave. 43°18′17″N 94°42′02″W	Wallingford	
2	Ellsworth Ranch Bridge	Ellsworth Ranch Bridge	July 15, 1998 (#98000869)	130th St. over the East Fork of the Des Moines River; 43°27′36″N 94°34′49″W	Armstrong	
3	Thomsen Round Barn		June 30, 1986 (#86001426)	Off Iowa Highway 15; 43°20′46″N 94°29′52″W	Armstrong	

== Grundy County ==
	Name on the Register	Image	Date listed	Location	City or town	Description
1	Grundy Center High School	Grundy Center High School	September 18, 2020 (#100005565)	1001 8th St. 42°21′30″N 92°46′26″W	Grundy Center	Not the current high school.
2	Grundy County Courthouse	Grundy County Courthouse	July 2, 1981 (#81000239)	Grundy Ave. 42°21′31″N 92°46′18″W	Grundy Center	
3	Chris Neessen House		January 12, 1984 (#84001253)	601 E. 4th 42°26′04″N 92°55′29″W	Wellsburg	

== Guthrie County ==
	Name on the Register	Image	Date listed	Location	City or town	Description
1	All Saints Catholic Church	All Saints Catholic Church	December 7, 2000 (#00001478)	420 N. Fremont; 41°30′25″N 94°19′02″W	Stuart	
2	John Cretsinger House		October 7, 1998 (#98001206)	1363 Burl Ln. 41°48′46″N 94°42′52″W	Coon Rapids	
3	Roswell and Elizabeth Garst Farmstead Historic District		August 12, 2009 (#09000610)	1390 Iowa Highway 141; 41°50′55″N 94°38′43″W	Coon Rapids	
4	Masonic Temple Building	Masonic Temple Building	April 12, 1996 (#96000400)	1311 N. 2nd St. 41°30′18″N 94°19′07″W	Stuart	
5	Octagon Barn, Richland Township		June 30, 1986 (#86001433)	Off Iowa Highway 141; 41°49′24″N 94°20′10″W	Richland Township	
6	Sexton Hotel	Sexton Hotel	December 18, 2013 (#13000924)	203 E. Front Street; 41°30′14″N 94°19′00″W	Stuart	
7	Springbrook State Park, Civilian Conservation Corps Area	Springbrook State Park, Civilian Conservation Corps Area	November 15, 1990 (#90001671)	Junction of Iowa Highway 384 and County Highway F25; 41°46′38″N 94°27′54″W	Guthrie Center	
8	Yale High School Gymnasium		December 28, 2018 (#100003261)	414 Lincoln St. 41°46′28″N 94°21′26″W	Yale	

=== Former listings ===
	Name on the Register	Image	Date listed	Date removed	Location	City or town	Description
1	Panora-Linden High School		July 23, 1974 (#74000786)	May 22, 1998	Bounded by Main, Market, 1st, and 2nd Sts.	Panora	Torn down in 1991

== Hamilton County ==
	Name on the Register	Image	Date listed	Location	City or town	Description
1	Albright Bridge	Albright Bridge	June 25, 1998 (#98000776)	130th St. at 510th Ave. over the Boone River; 42°24′20″N 93°48′36″W	Webster City	
2	Kendall Young Public Library	Kendall Young Public Library	May 23, 1983 (#83000361)	1201 Willson Ave. 42°27′30″N 93°50′12″W	Webster City	
3	William Oakland Round Barn	William Oakland Round Barn	June 30, 1986 (#86001434)	Off U.S. Route 69; 42°29′11″N 93°38′00″W	Blairsburg	
4	Schultz Brothers Drug Store	Schultz Brothers Drug Store	May 16, 1996 (#96000518)	116 Main St. 42°29′19″N 93°32′38″W	Williams	
5	State Bank of Stratford	State Bank of Stratford	July 7, 1983 (#83000362)	801 Shakespeare St. 42°16′14″N 93°55′01″W	Stratford	
6	Tremaine Bridge	Tremaine Bridge	May 15, 1998 (#98000519)	280th St. over the Boone River; 42°23′12″N 93°48′31″W	Webster City	
7	Webster City Post Office	Webster City Post Office	July 6, 1982 (#82002619)	801 Willson Ave. 42°28′06″N 93°49′09″W	Webster City	
8	William J. and Hattie J. Zitterell House	William J. and Hattie J. Zitterell House	February 16, 1996 (#96000057)	821 Division St. 42°28′04″N 93°49′28″W	Webster City	

== Howard County ==
	Name on the Register	Image	Date listed	Location	City or town	Description
1	Bohemian Savings Bank	Bohemian Savings Bank	September 13, 1990 (#88002806)	Main St. 43°13′05″N 92°05′26″W	Protivin	
2	Cresco Opera House	Cresco Opera House	August 27, 1981 (#81000245)	115 W. 2nd Ave. 43°21′12″N 92°08′04″W	Cresco	
3	James C. Fellows House	James C. Fellows House	June 21, 1982 (#82002621)	Main St. 43°22′02″N 92°33′05″W	Riceville	
4	Howard County Courthouse	Howard County Courthouse	July 2, 1981 (#81000246)	Elm St. 43°22′26″N 92°07′03″W	Cresco	
5	Kellow House	Kellow House	November 22, 1977 (#77000517)	324 4th Ave., W. 43°22′33″N 92°07′16″W	Cresco	
6	Lime Springs Mill Complex	Lime Springs Mill Complex	April 11, 1977 (#77000518)	Former Iowa Highway 157; 43°27′54″N 92°16′45″W	Lime Springs	
7	Polygonal Barn, New Oregon Township		June 30, 1986 (#86001437)	Off Iowa Highway 39; 43°13′32″N 92°07′38″W	New Oregon Township	

=== Former listing ===
	Name on the Register	Image	Date listed	Date removed	Location	City or town	Description
1	South Ward School	South Ward School	November 10, 1982 (#82000408)	September 19, 2019	500 S. Elm St. 43°22′03″N 92°07′02″W	Cresco	

== Humboldt County ==
	Name on the Register	Image	Date listed	Location	City or town	Description
1	Berkhimer Bridge	Berkhimer Bridge	May 15, 1998 (#98000523)	245th St. over the Des Moines River; 42°44′21″N 94°15′11″W	Humboldt	
2	Corydon Brown House	Corydon Brown House	November 14, 1978 (#78001223)	East of Dakota City off Iowa Highway 3; 42°43′28″N 94°11′27″W	Dakota City	
3	Humboldt County Court House	Humboldt County Court House	August 28, 2003 (#03000823)	203 Main St. 42°43′21″N 94°12′58″W	Dakota City	
4	Humboldt Free Public Library	Humboldt Free Public Library	May 23, 1983 (#83000368)	30 6th St., N. 42°43′16″N 94°13′10″W	Humboldt	
5	Renwick Generating Plant	Renwick Generating Plant	February 17, 1995 (#95000099)	103 N. Field St. 42°49′43″N 93°58′42″W	Renwick	
6	Stephen Harris Taft House	Stephen Harris Taft House	December 27, 2002 (#02001601)	809 1st Ave., N. 42°43′20″N 94°13′11″W	Humboldt	

=== Former listing ===
	Name on the Register	Image	Date listed	Date removed	Location	City or town	Description
1	Des Moines River Bridge		May 15, 1998 (#98000522)	September 19, 2019	Iowa Highway 3 over the West Fork of the Des Moines River; 42°43′55″N 94°15′30″W	Humboldt	Replaced in 2010

== Ida County ==
	Name on the Register	Image	Date listed	Location	City or town	Description
1	Alvin Bushnell Bell House	Alvin Bushnell Bell House	January 27, 1983 (#83000369)	310 Quimby St. 42°20′37″N 95°28′27″W	Ida Grove	Designed by architect George Franklin Barber
2	Ida County Courthouse	Ida County Courthouse	March 15, 1974 (#74000787)	401 Moorehead St. 42°20′31″N 95°28′04″W	Ida Grove	
3	Moorehead Stagecoach Inn	Moorehead Stagecoach Inn	August 27, 1974 (#74000788)	Off U.S. Route 59; 42°21′15″N 95°28′44″W	Ida Grove	
4	Dr. Francis B. Warnock House		October 13, 1988 (#88001945)	201 Maple St. 42°18′57″N 95°36′02″W	Battle Creek	Designed by architect George Franklin Barber
5	Waveland Round Barn		June 30, 1986 (#86001438)	Off U.S. Route 20; 42°29′46″N 95°42′09″W	Cushing	

=== Former listings ===
	Name on the Register	Image	Date listed	Date removed	Location	City or town	Description
1	Turner Hall		January 22, 1975 (#75000691)	June 21, 2007	SE corner of Keil and 2nd Streets	Holstein	Demolished in March, 1975

== Kossuth County ==
	Name on the Register	Image	Date listed	Location	City or town	Description
1	Algona Junior and Senior High School Building and High School Building Annex		December 10, 2014 (#14001006)	213 and 301 S. Harlan St. 43°04′03″N 94°14′01″W	Algona	
2	William C. and Hertha Dau House		July 29, 1993 (#93000654)	315 S. Dodge St. 43°03′58″N 94°14′10″W	Algona	
3	Des Moines River Bridge		May 15, 1998 (#98000535)	County Road P14 over the East Fork of the Des Moines River; 43°20′42″N 94°26′33″W	Swea City	
4	G.A.R. Memorial Hall	G.A.R. Memorial Hall	January 15, 2014 (#13001077)	122 S. Dodge St. 43°04′07″N 94°14′12″W	Algona	
5	Land and Loan Office Building	Land and Loan Office Building	March 19, 1998 (#98000250)	123 E. State St. 43°04′08″N 94°14′08″W	Algona	Also known as the Henry Adams Building
6	Lu Verne City Jail	Lu Verne City Jail	December 18, 1992 (#92001662)	307 3rd St. 42°54′39″N 94°05′00″W	Lu Verne	

=== Former listings ===
	Name on the Register	Image	Date listed	Date removed	Location	City or town	Description
1	Longbottom Polygonal Barn		June 30, 1986 (#86001456)	August 26, 2005	Off Iowa Highway 226	Titonka	Destroyed by fire in June 2003

== Louisa County ==
	Name on the Register	Image	Date listed	Location	City or town	Description
1	Bethel Church	Bethel Church	February 22, 1979 (#79003698)	Northeast of Morning Sun, off U.S. Route 61; 41°06′37″N 91°11′14″W	Morning Sun	
2	Community Building	Community Building	August 14, 1973 (#73000735)	122 E. Maple St. 41°16′36″N 91°21′37″W	Columbus Junction	
3	Fairview Church and Cemetery		November 28, 2023 (#100009486)	11501 Co Rd H22; 41°05′15″N 91°09′00″W	Wapello vicinity	
4	Commercial Hotel	Commercial Hotel	August 30, 2001 (#01000912)	227 N. Main St. 41°10′52″N 91°11′13″W	Wapello	
5	County Line Bridge	County Line Bridge	May 15, 1998 (#98000513)	140th block of County Line Rd. over Long Creek; 41°16′01″N 91°29′07″W	Columbus Junction	Extends into Washington County
6	Florence-Council On The Iowa Site	Florence-Council On The Iowa Site	December 27, 1978 (#78001243)	At the site of the now-gone village of Florence; 41°06′29″N 91°06′57″W	Oakville	
7	Gipple's Quarry Bridge	Gipple's Quarry Bridge	May 15, 1998 (#98000512)	100 block of V Ave. over Buffington Creek; 41°12′17″N 91°24′31″W	Columbus Junction	
8	Louisa County Courthouse	Louisa County Courthouse	July 2, 1981 (#81000253)	Main St. 41°10′43″N 91°11′10″W	Wapello	
9	Mellinger Memorial Library		September 16, 2024 (#100010863)	11 East Division Street; 41°05′45″N 91°15′18″W	Morning Sun	
10	Toolesboro Mound Group	Toolesboro Mound Group	October 15, 1966 (#66000337)	6568 Toolesboro Rd. 41°08′34″N 91°03′50″W	Toolesboro	

=== Former listing ===
	Name on the Register	Image	Date listed	Date removed	Location	City or town	Description
1	Judge Francis Springer House		January 27, 1983 (#83000388)	September 5, 2000	South of Columbus City	Columbus City	Burned by owner in October 1997.

== Mills County ==
	Name on the Register	Image	Date listed	Location	City or town	Description
1	Davis Oriole Earthlodge Site	Davis Oriole Earthlodge Site	October 16, 2012 (#12001018)	in Pony Creek Park; 41°04′15″N 95°47′17″W	Glenwood vicinity	
2	Glenwood Archeological District	Glenwood Archeological District	May 22, 2013 (#13000296)	Address Restricted	Glenwood	part of the Archeological Resources of the Central Plains Tradition in the Loess Hills Region of Iowa MPS
3	Mills County Sheriff's Residence and Jail		October 15, 2026 (#100013525)	23 N Vine Street; 41°02′50″N 95°44′30″W	Glenwood	
3	Nishnabotna River Bridge		May 15, 1998 (#98000496)	County Road M16 over the Nishnabotna River north of Henderson; 41°05′21″N 95°28′49″W	Anderson Township	
4	Plattsmouth Bridge	Plattsmouth Bridge	April 15, 1993 (#92000755)	U.S. Route 34 over the Missouri River southwest of Pacific Junction; 41°00′03″N 95°52′01″W	Plattville Township	Extends into Cass County, Nebraska
5	Pony Creek Park	Pony Creek Park	July 30, 1971 (#71000299)	Northwest of Glenwood; 41°04′16″N 95°47′12″W	Oak Township	
6	West Oak Forest Earthlodge Site	West Oak Forest Earthlodge Site	June 11, 2010 (#10000342)	Address Restricted	Glenwood	part of the Archeological Resources of the Central Plains Tradition in the Loess Hills Region of Iowa MPS

== O'Brien County ==
	Name on the Register	Image	Date listed	Location	City or town	Description
1	Carnegie Library	Carnegie Library	April 11, 1977 (#77001504)	321 10th St. 43°10′47″N 95°51′14″W	Sheldon	
2	Indian Village Site	Indian Village Site	October 15, 1966 (#66000888)	Left bank of Waterman Creek, east of Sutherland; 42°58′50″N 95°25′22″W	Sutherland	
3	O'Brien County Courthouse	O'Brien County Courthouse	July 2, 1981 (#81000656)	Fir Ave. 43°05′12″N 95°37′38″W	Primghar	

== Osceola County ==
	Name on the Register	Image	Date listed	Location	City or town	Description
1	Osceola County Courthouse	Osceola County Courthouse	July 2, 1981 (#81000261)	3rd Ave. and 8th St. 43°24′07″N 95°44′51″W	Sibley	

== Palo Alto County ==
	Name on the Register	Image	Date listed	Location	City or town	Description
1	Emmetsburg Public Library	Emmetsburg Public Library	May 23, 1983 (#83000397)	10th St. on Courthouse Sq. 43°05′19″N 94°41′52″W	Emmetsburg	
2	First Presbyterian Church		May 24, 2010 (#10000276)	101 1st Ave. SW; 42°57′35″N 94°26′47″W	West Bend	
3	Grotto of the Redemption	Grotto of the Redemption	February 23, 2001 (#00001679)	300 N. Broadway; 42°57′50″N 94°26′44″W	West Bend	
4	Ormsby-Kelly House		July 29, 1977 (#77000545)	2403 W. 7th St. 43°06′46″N 94°41′02″W	Emmetsburg	

== Pocahontas County ==
	Name on the Register	Image	Date listed	Location	City or town	Description
1	Laurens Carnegie Free Library	Laurens Carnegie Free Library	November 5, 1974 (#74000804)	263 N. 3rd St. 42°50′54″N 94°50′56″W	Laurens	
2	Pocahontas County Courthouse	Pocahontas County Courthouse	July 2, 1981 (#81000264)	Court Sq. 42°44′14″N 94°40′07″W	Pocahontas	
3	Saints Peter and Paul Catholic Church	Saints Peter and Paul Catholic Church	March 1, 1994 (#94000086)	16 2nd Ave., NW. 42°44′05″N 94°40′15″W	Pocahontas	

== Ringgold County ==
	Name on the Register	Image	Date listed	Location	City or town	Description
1	Beaconsfield Supply Store	Beaconsfield Supply Store	May 24, 2007 (#07000451)	1621 Main St. 40°48′27″N 94°03′01″W	Beaconsfield	1916 one-story brick building which was the birthplace of the Hy-Vee chain of stores and later served as a telephone office, city hall, and community center.
2	Middlefork Methodist Episcopal Church	Middlefork Methodist Episcopal Church	November 29, 1990 (#90001801)	South of U.S. Route 169 on the eastern side of the Middle Fork Grand River; 40°35′47″N 94°19′03″W	Redding	
3	Ringgold County Courthouse	Ringgold County Courthouse	July 2, 1981 (#81000267)	Madison St. 40°42′46″N 94°14′26″W	Mount Ayr	
4	Ringgold County Jail	Ringgold County Jail	June 19, 1979 (#79000939)	201 E. Monroe St. 40°42′43″N 94°14′09″W	Mount Ayr	
5	Lee Shay Farmhouse	Lee Shay Farmhouse	November 6, 1986 (#86003172)	Off County Road P27; 40°41′13″N 94°22′57″W	Maloy	

=== Former listings ===
	Name on the Register	Image	Date listed	Date removed	Location	City or town	Description
1	W.J. Buck Polygonal Barn		June 30, 1986 (#86001471)	September 8, 2022	Off U.S. Route 169; 40°46′57″N 94°15′25″W	Diagonal	

== Sioux County ==
	Name on the Register	Image	Date listed	Location	City or town	Description
1	Charles M. and Emma M. Fischer Fleshman House	Charles M. and Emma M. Fischer Fleshman House	January 7, 1993 (#92001743)	919 9th St. 42°59′44″N 96°28′52″W	Hawarden	
2	Hawarden City Hall, Fire Station and Auditorium	Hawarden City Hall, Fire Station and Auditorium	March 10, 2009 (#09000107)	715 Central Ave. 42°59′39″N 96°29′08″W	Hawarden	
3	Sioux County Courthouse	Sioux County Courthouse	April 11, 1977 (#77000559)	Off Iowa Highway 10; 43°00′16″N 96°03′32″W	Orange City	
4	Zwemer Hall, Northwestern College	Zwemer Hall, Northwestern College	May 28, 1975 (#75000698)	101 7th St., SW. 42°59′53″N 96°03′30″W	Orange City	

== Taylor County ==
	Name on the Register	Image	Date listed	Location	City or town	Description
1	Bedford Commercial Historic District	Bedford Commercial Historic District	September 12, 2002 (#02001032)	200-500 blocks of Main St., the 500 and 600 blocks of Court, and the 500 block of Central; 40°40′01″N 94°43′07″W	Bedford	
2	Bedford House	Bedford House	June 14, 1977 (#77000560)	306 Main St. 40°40′04″N 94°43′13″W	Bedford	
3	Bedford Oil Company Station	Bedford Oil Company Station	July 15, 1999 (#99000831)	601 Madison; 40°40′02″N 94°43′15″W	Bedford	
4	Bedford Public Library	Bedford Public Library	May 23, 1983 (#83000405)	Jefferson St. 40°36′29″N 94°44′53″W	Bedford	
5	Lenox Hotel	Lenox Hotel	December 20, 2002 (#02001538)	114 S. Main St. 40°52′52″N 94°33′33″W	Lenox	
6	Lenox Round Barn	Lenox Round Barn	May 5, 1999 (#99000490)	1001 Pollock Boulevard; 40°40′39″N 94°43′45″W	Bedford	
7	Taylor County Courthouse	Taylor County Courthouse	July 2, 1981 (#81000271)	Court Ave. 40°40′01″N 94°43′08″W	Bedford	

== Union County ==
	Name on the Register	Image	Date listed	Location	City or town	Description
1	Chicago, Burlington and Quincy Railroad-Creston Station	Chicago, Burlington and Quincy Railroad-Creston Station	August 15, 1973 (#73000739)	200 W. Adams St. 41°03′25″N 94°21′45″W	Creston	
2	Grand River Bridge		May 15, 1998 (#98000479)	230th St. over the Grand River; 40°57′48″N 94°02′20″W	Arispe	
3	Iowana Hotel	Iowana Hotel	May 12, 2009 (#09000298)	203 W. Montgomery St. 41°03′31″N 94°21′47″W	Creston	
4	Jefferson Elementary School	Jefferson Elementary School	October 24, 2002 (#02001223)	501 North Cherry; 41°03′45″N 94°21′23″W	Creston	
5	Odd Fellows Block	Odd Fellows Block	January 15, 2014 (#13001079)	175 E. Kansas St. 41°01′42″N 94°11′49″W	Afton	
6	U.S. Post Office	U.S. Post Office	December 8, 1978 (#78001264)	Maple St. 41°03′34″N 94°21′46″W	Creston	

== Wayne County ==
	Name on the Register	Image	Date listed	Location	City or town	Description
1	Hotel Rea	Hotel Rea	May 8, 2020 (#100004426)	207 W. State St. 40°45′29″N 93°19′10″W	Corydon	Small-town hotel built in 1898 by local businessman Everett Rea.
2	Nelson Round Barn	Nelson Round Barn	November 19, 1986 (#86003189)	County Road J46; 40°42′24″N 93°20′44″W	Allerton	
3	Pleasant Hill School	Pleasant Hill School	May 28, 1975 (#75000701)	3 miles north of Lineville on U.S. Route 65; 40°37′26″N 93°29′48″W	Lineville	
4	W.H. Tedford House	W.H. Tedford House	March 26, 1979 (#79000947)	312 S. West St. 40°45′25″N 93°19′24″W	Corydon	

== Winnebago County ==
	Name on the Register	Image	Date listed	Location	City or town	Description
1	Round Barn, Norway Township		February 27, 1987 (#87000507)	Off County Road R60; 43°29′22″N 93°35′51″W	Norway Township	
2	Charles J. Thompson House	Charles J. Thompson House	November 30, 1978 (#78001271)	336 N. Clark St. 43°15′58″N 93°38′18″W	Forest City	
3	Winnebago County Courthouse	Winnebago County Courthouse	July 2, 1981 (#81000275)	J St. 43°15′47″N 93°38′19″W	Forest City	

=== Former listings ===
	Name on the Register	Image	Date listed	Date removed	Location	City or town	Description
1	Forest City Public Library		April 5, 1984 (#84001609)	March 7, 2016	E. I St. and Clark; 43°15′56″N 93°38′15″W	Forest City	

== Worth County ==
	Name on the Register	Image	Date listed	Location	City or town	Description
1	Chicago, Milwaukee, and St. Paul Railroad-Grafton Station	Chicago, Milwaukee, and St. Paul Railroad-Grafton Station	June 23, 1976 (#76000815)	Iowa Highway 337; 43°19′33″N 93°04′13″W	Grafton	
2	First Methodist Episcopal Church	First Methodist Episcopal Church	August 16, 2000 (#00000985)	401 Second Street; 43°21′07″N 93°12′40″W	Kensett	
3	Northwood Central Avenue Historic District	Northwood Central Avenue Historic District	September 19, 2006 (#06000857)	Roughly Central Avenue, W. near 5th St. to 9th St. on the east 43°26′46″N 93°13′22″W	Northwood	
4	Old Worth County Courthouse	Old Worth County Courthouse	July 2, 1981 (#81000276)	921 Central Avenue; 43°26′38″N 93°13′07″W	Northwood	
5	Rhodes Mill	Rhodes Mill	November 24, 1978 (#78001274)	Main Street; 43°15′50″N 93°25′16″W	Fertile	
6	Worth County Courthouse	Worth County Courthouse	July 2, 1981 (#81000705)	Central Avenue between 10th and 11th Streets; 43°26′40″N 93°13′03″W	Northwood	

== See also ==
- List of National Historic Landmarks in Iowa
- List of historical societies in Iowa
