= Algona Junior and Senior High School Building and High School Building Annex =

- U.S. National Register of Historic Places
- Location within Iowa Location within the United States
- Location: 213 and 301 S. Harlan St., Algona, Iowa
- Coordinates: 43°04′02.5″N 94°14′01.1″W
- Area: about 3 acres (1.2 ha)
- Built: 1931, 1951
- Architect: Proudfoot, Rawson, Souers & Thomas; Keffer and Jones
- Architectural style: Classical Revival; Modern Movement
- NRHP reference No.: 14001006
- Added to NRHP: December 10, 2014

Algona Junior and Senior High School Building and High School Building Annex are historic buildings located in Algona, Iowa, United States. It opened as Algona High School in 1931, and it served that purpose until 1970 when a new high school building opened on the south side of town. In 1951 an annex building was built on the corner of South Harlan and East Nebraska Streets. The buildings were then converted into a middle school beginning in 1971 and they continued to serve that purpose until 2008. Both buildings were listed together on the National Register of Historic Places in 2014.

The 1931 building is a two-story brick structure that was built in the Neoclassical style. It was designed by the Des Moines architectural firm of Proudfoot, Rawson, Souers & Thomas. The building, located in the middle of the block, features a gymnasium and auditorium in the middle of the building, classrooms on the east and west sides of the building, and administrative offices on the south side. The building was designed at the time when extracurricular activities for sports and theatre, multi-function areas as gym/cafeteria and library/study hall, and "progressive education" ideologies that provided more hands-on learning for science, commercial, manual training, and domestic science were all becoming popular. The single-story brick annex was designed by the Des Moines architectural firm of Keffer and Jones in the Modern Movement style. It featured an open floor plan and glass block walls. This building was used for the cafeteria and kitchen, and it provided space for music, band, and industrial arts.

== See also ==
- National Register of Historic Places listings in Kossuth County, Iowa
