= Charles Wolf House =

Historic house in Iowa, United States

- U.S. National Register of Historic Places
- Location within Iowa Location within the United States
- Location: 401 5th St. Parkersburg, Iowa
- Coordinates: 42°34′34″N 92°47′24″W
- Area: less than one acre
- Built: 1895
- Architect: Harry Netcott
- Architectural style: Late Victorian
- NRHP reference No.: 79000884
- Added to NRHP: October 1, 1979

Charles Wolf House, also known as the Parkersburg Historical Home, is a historic building located in Parkersburg, Iowa, United States. Wolf was a native of Freeport, Illinois who moved to Parkersburg in 1875 after he, his father and brother-in-law bought the Exchange Bank. He had local architect Harry Netcott design this large Late Victorian style house, which was completed in 1895. The heavy frame structure is covered with a brick veneer. It features a three-story Châteauesque corner tower, a large projecting bay on both the north and south sides of the house, and a round-arch entryway. Gus Pfeiffer bought the house in 1926 following Mary Wolf's death and donated it to the city. It served a variety of purposes including an elementary school, church, community center, fraternal hall, and library. The building sat empty for three years when it became the home of the Parkersburg Historical Society's museum. The house was listed on the National Register of Historic Places in 1979.
