= Coldwater Church of the Brethren =

- U.S. National Register of Historic Places
- Location within Iowa Location within the United States
- Location: 100 Block N. High St. Greene, Iowa
- Coordinates: 42°53′32″N 92°48′32″W
- Area: 1 acre (0.40 ha)
- Built: 1873
- Built by: Aaron Moss
- NRHP reference No.: 79000883
- Added to NRHP: July 13, 1979

Coldwater Church of the Brethren is a historic church building located in Greene, Iowa, United States. The Church of the Brethren congregation was established by Philip Moss in Coldwater Township in 1855. Initially, they held their services in area schoolhouses. The town of Green was established in 1871, and they chose to build their church there in 1873. Philip Moss' son Aaron built the church. It is a 40 by 60 feet (12 by 18 m) front gable structure built over a raised basement. The stone was quarried locally. It is thought the lower level was used as a parsonage until a frame dwelling was erected to the east of the church in 1915. Originally one room, the upper level has been divided to create two Sunday school rooms at one end. The church building was added to the National Register of Historic Places in 1979.
