= Odd Fellows Block (Afton, Iowa) =

- U.S. National Register of Historic Places
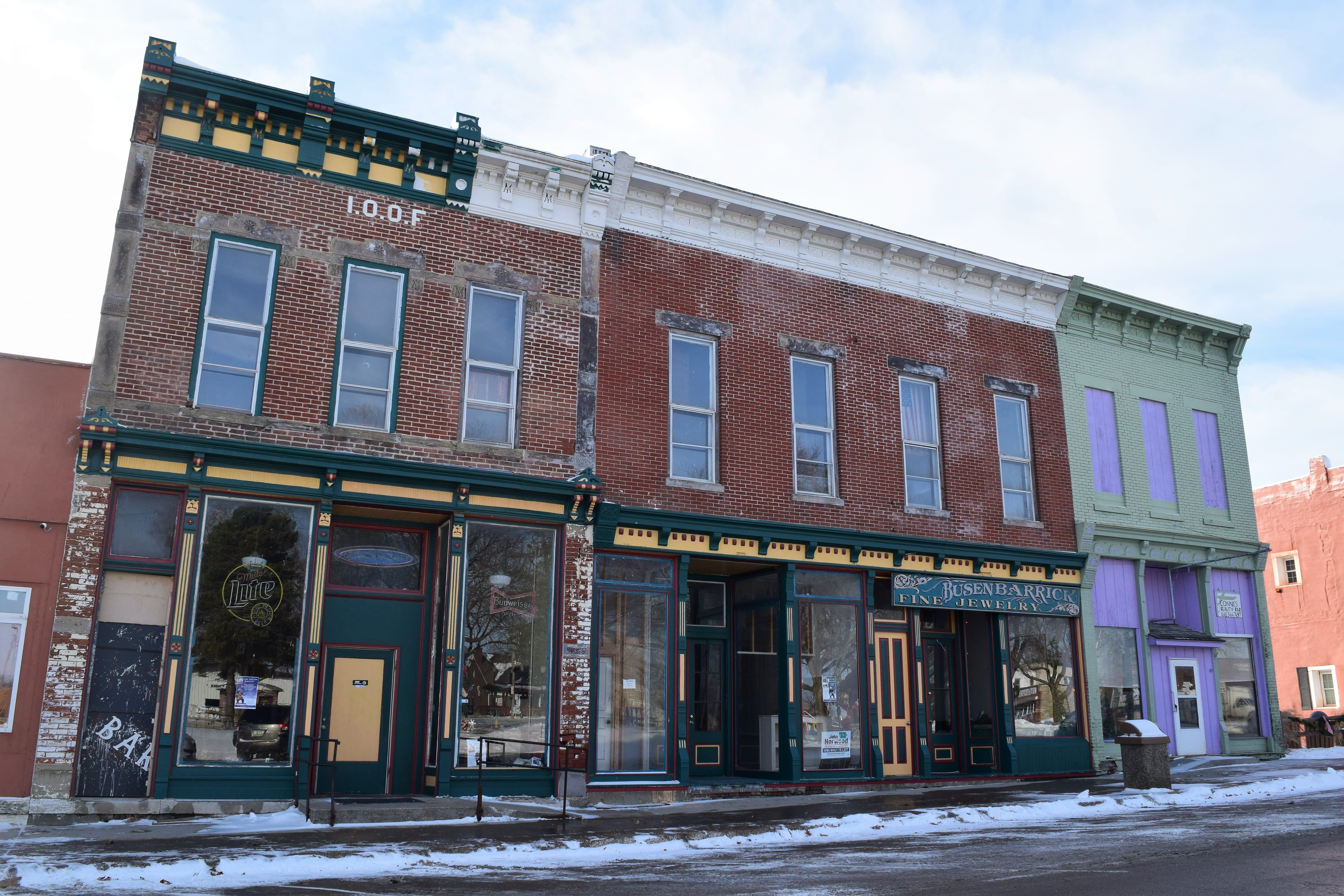

- Location within Iowa Location within the United States
- Location: 175 E. Kansas St. Afton, Iowa
- Coordinates: 41°01′41″N 94°11′48″W
- Area: less than one acre
- Architectural style: Italianate
- NRHP reference No.: 13001079
- Added to NRHP: January 15, 2014

Odd Fellows Block is a historic building located in Afton, Iowa, United States. The historical significance of this two-story brick commercial building is its use of the Italianate style for a commercial building. The storefronts on the first floor feature a highly decorative storefront cornice and cast columns. The second floor has tall and narrow windows that are capped with ornate hoods. Across the top of the building is an elaborate detailed cornice. The details on the western portion of the building are more restrained, which is in keeping with its later construction date. The building was listed on the National Register of Historic Places in 2014.
