= James C. Fellows House =

Historic house in Iowa, United States

- U.S. National Register of Historic Places
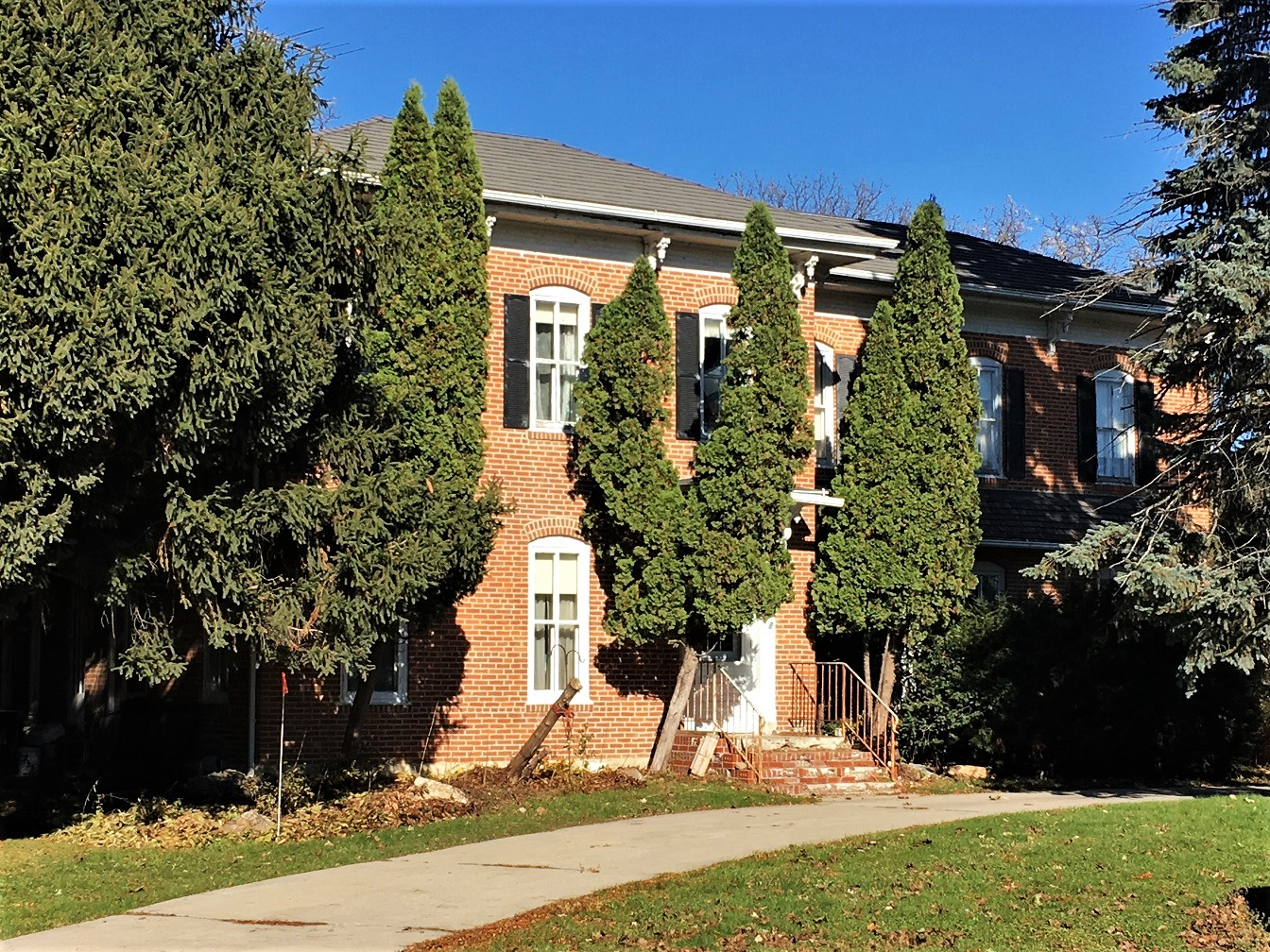

- Location within Iowa Location within the United States
- Location: Main St. Riceville, Iowa
- Coordinates: 43°21′51″N 92°33′05″W
- Area: 17 acres (6.9 ha)
- Built: c. 1870
- Built by: James C. Fellows
- Architectural style: Italianate
- NRHP reference No.: 82002621
- Added to NRHP: June 21, 1982

The James C. Fellows House is a historic building located in Riceville, Iowa, United States. Fellows was a brick mason who settled in Riceville in 1856 with his brother Harris, who was a physician. That same year the town's first store, Kerr & Fellows, opened. The family eventually built and operated the Hotel Fellows. Around the time this house was built, James Fellows started to produce bricks from the clay on his property and they were used in the construction of this house. The Italianate style house features a low-pitched, hipped roof, and broad bracketed eaves. It follows an L-shaped plan. The house was listed on the National Register of Historic Places in 1982.
