= Stephen Harris Taft House =

Historic house in Iowa, United States

- U.S. National Register of Historic Places
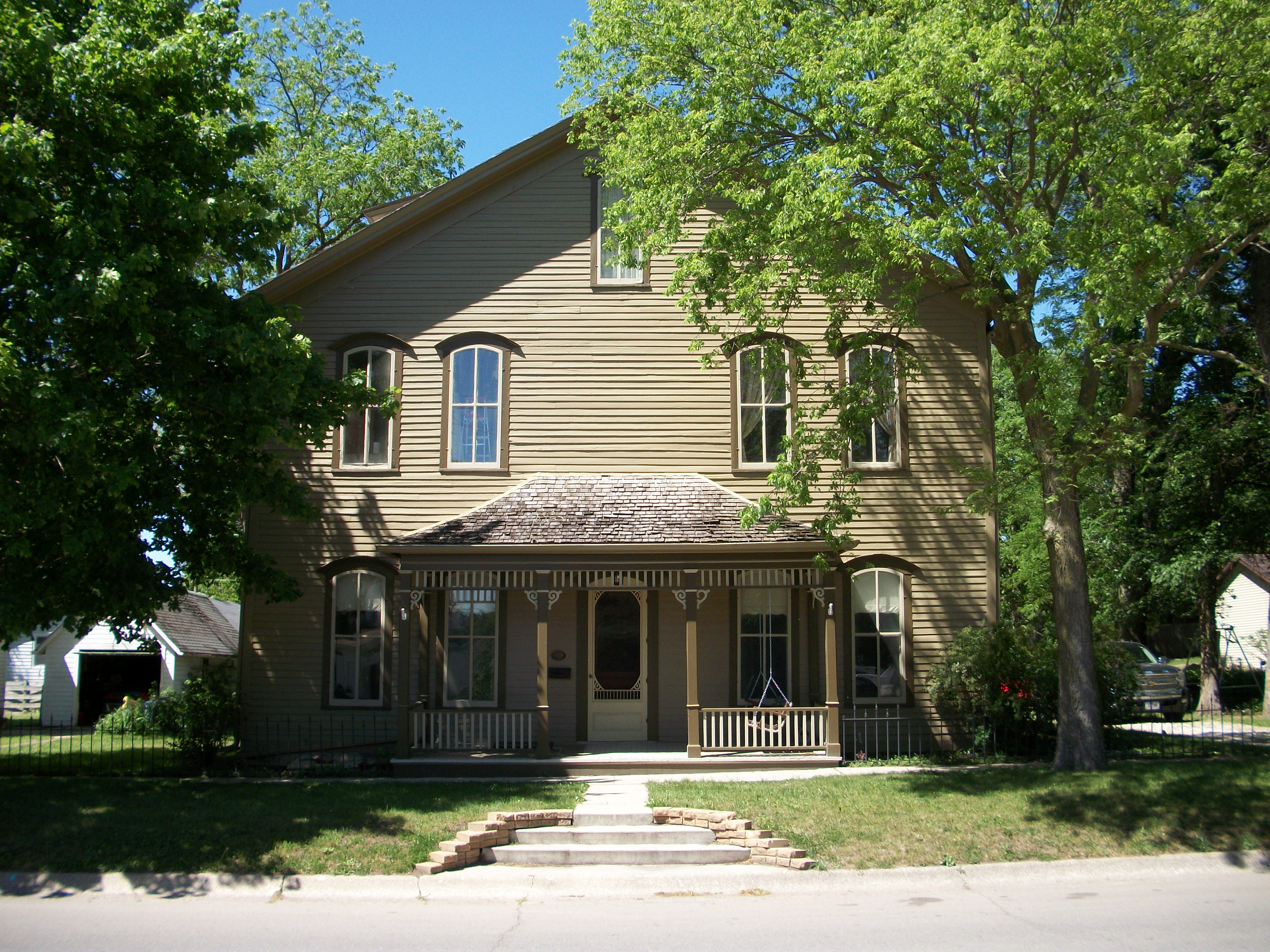

- Location within Iowa Location within the United States
- Location: 809 1st Ave., N. Humboldt, Iowa
- Coordinates: 42°43′20″N 94°13′12″W
- Area: less than one acre
- Built: 1864
- Architectural style: Late Victorian
- NRHP reference No.: 02001601
- Added to NRHP: December 27, 2002

The Stephen Harris Taft House is a historic house in Humboldt, Iowa, United States. It was listed on the National Register of Historic Places in 2002. Stephen Taft was a native of New York who came to Iowa in 1862 and established the settlement of Springvale, which was eventually renamed Humboldt. He was also instrumental in establishing the now defunct Humboldt College. Taft had this house built in 1864, and continued to live here until 1897 when he and his wife moved to California because of her health. The house is a 2½-story rectangular structure that measures approximately 38 by 40 feet (12 by 12 m). The wing on the north side of the house was originally the summer kitchen, and continues to serve as the kitchen. Three sides of the house are coursed, irregularly shaped limestone that was quarried locally. The main facade is composed of cedar clapboard siding.
