= Charles H. & Theresa H. McBride Bungalow =

Historic house in Iowa, United States

- U.S. National Register of Historic Places
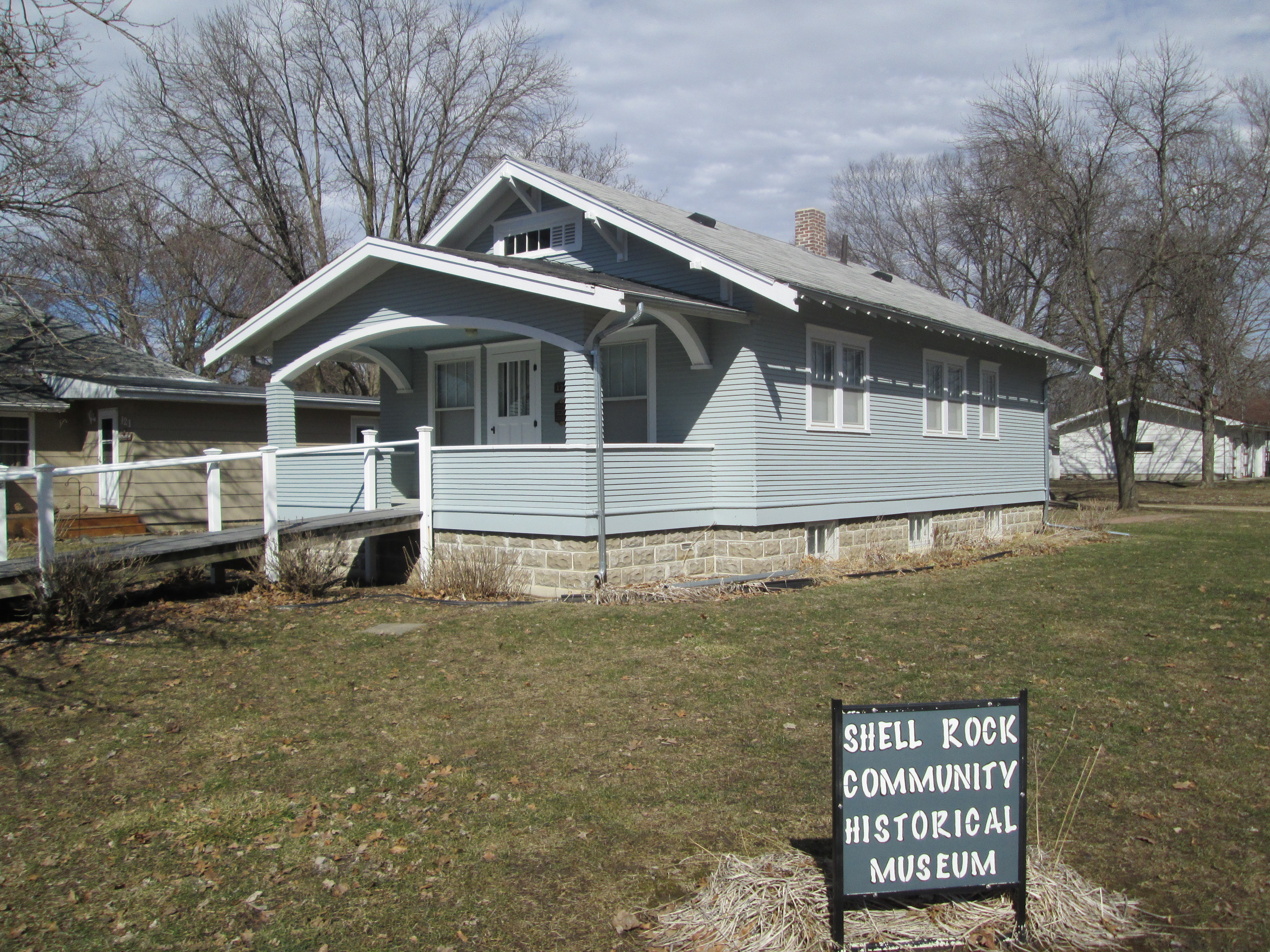

- Location within Iowa Location within the United States
- Location: 127 E. Adair St. Shell Rock, Iowa
- Coordinates: 42°42′45.8″N 92°34′43.7″W
- Area: less than one acre
- Built: 1919
- Architectural style: Bungalow/Craftsman
- NRHP reference No.: 10001205
- Added to NRHP: February 7, 2011

The Charles H. & Theresa H. McBride Bungalow is a historic building located in Shell Rock, Iowa, United States. While there are numerous examples American Craftsman residential architecture in town, there are few bungalows. This is the only example in town of the bungalow subtype that features a rectangular plan with a gable front and a separate gable front porch. It is also rare for a bungalow, in general, to have a matching garage and even rarer to have a matching concrete block foundation as this house and garage. The house's original location was on a flood plain and it was in danger of being torn down. It was acquired by the Shell Rock Community Historical Society and moved to its present location in 2006. It opened as the society's museum the following year. The house and garage were listed together on the National Register of Historic Places in 2011.
