= Renke and Wubke Renken House =

Historic house in Iowa, United States

- U.S. National Register of Historic Places
- Location within Iowa Location within the United States
- Location: 401 Coates St. Parkersburg, Iowa
- Coordinates: 42°34′39″N 92°47′22″W
- Area: less than one acre
- Built: 1884
- Architect: F.M. Ellis
- Architectural style: Italianate; Queen Anne
- NRHP reference No.: 13001075
- Added to NRHP: January 15, 2014

The Renke and Wubke Renken House, also known as the R.G. Renken Estate, is a historic building located in Parkersburg, Iowa, United States. The two-story, brick, Italianate style house was designed by F.M. Ellis and completed in 1884. The wrap-around porch, added in 1901, is influenced by the emerging Queen Anne style. The house was built for R.G. Renken, a native of Lehr, Germany who emigrated to the United States in 1870 and settled in Parkersburg the following year. He and his brother-in-law Fritz Tammen became partners in a successful general merchandise and clothing store named Renken and Tammen. Later on, Renken became involved in banking and with Charles Wolf, whose house is also on the National Register, managed the community's finances. He also held the positions of school board treasurer and town recorder. Renken contributed $10,000 in 1898 to build the community's first electric power plant, Parkersburg Electric Light & Power Company. He served as one of the power plant's directors. The house was listed on the National Register of Historic Places in 2014.
