= Lee Shay Farmhouse =

Historic house in Iowa, United States

- U.S. National Register of Historic Places
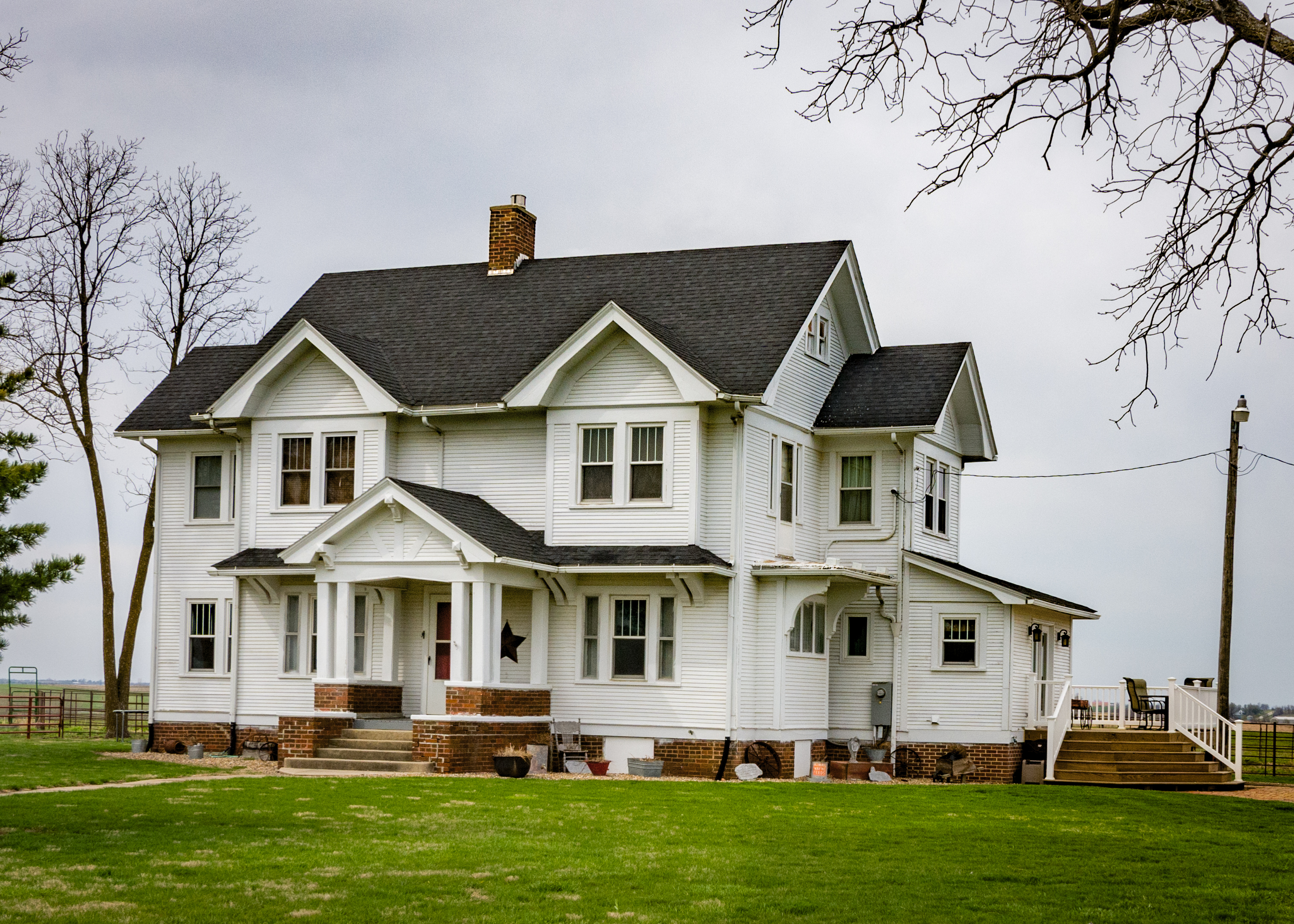

- Location within Iowa Location within the United States
- Location: Off County Road P27
- Nearest city: Maloy, Iowa
- Coordinates: 40°41′13″N 94°22′57″W
- Built: 1919-1920
- Architect: Kraetsch & Kraetsch
- NRHP reference No.: 86003172
- Added to NRHP: November 6, 1986

The Lee Shay Farmhouse, also known as the Lee Shay Farmstead, is a historic residence located in rural Ringgold County, Iowa, United States near the town of Maloy. Joseph Leo Shay (1882–1961) and Teresa Cecelia Eason Shay (1890–1975) were married in 1911 and moved to this farm the following year. During their fifty years together here they raised four daughters. They hired the Des Moines architectural firm of Kraetsch & Kraetsch to design this house. It was constructed from 1919 to 1920. A fire in one of the farm buildings in August 1920 did some damage to the structure before it was completed. It was listed on the National Register of Historic Places in 1986.

The two-story frame house's dimensions are 33 by 25 feet (10.1 by 7.6 m). It exhibits elements that are consistent with the Tudor Revival style. Houses like this one are more commonly found in an urban area. Its farmstead location reflects Iowa's rural prosperity at the end of what is known as the "Golden Age of Agriculture."
