= W.H. Tedford House =

Historic house in Iowa, United States

- U.S. National Register of Historic Places
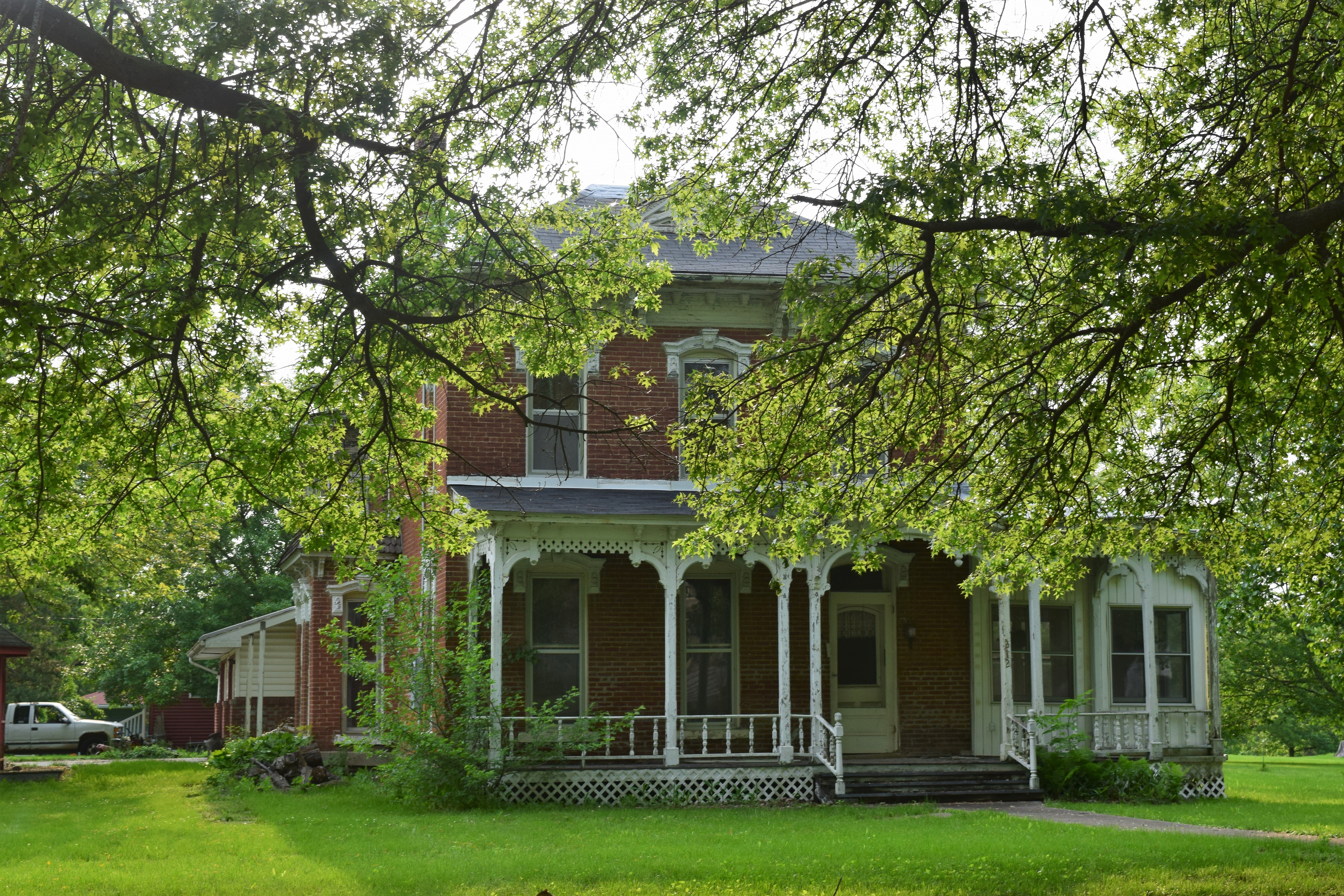

- Location within Iowa Location within the United States
- Location: 312 S. West St. Corydon, Iowa
- Coordinates: 40°45′19″N 93°19′20″W
- Area: less than one acre
- Built: 1887
- Architectural style: Italianate
- NRHP reference No.: 79000947
- Added to NRHP: March 26, 1979

The W.H. Tedford House, also known as the Poston House, is an historical building located in Corydon, Iowa, United States. The house was built in 1887 for W.H. Tedford, a local attorney who served as a justice of the district court from 1891 to 1901. The house was sold to Eugene E. Poston after Tedford's death in 1917, and it remained in that family well into the 20th century. The house is a typical example of late 19th century vernacular Italianate residential architecture found in Iowa. The house features a bracketed cornice and large window hoods. The elaborate woodwork detail of the porch is of particular note. It is capped with a low, crested hipped roof. The house was listed on the National Register of Historic Places in 1979.

== The Tedford Family ==
William Hamill Tedford was born in Blount County, Tennessee on November 8, 1844. He moved with his parents to Louisa County, Iowa in 1851. In 1861, Tedford enlisted in Company F, Eleventh Iowa Infantry and served four years with the Union army during the U.S. Civil War. Following the War, he attended Grand View Academy, and then graduated from the Law Department at the State University of Iowa (now, the University of Iowa) in 1869. Shortly after, he began practicing law in Corydon, Iowa, where he was a senior member of the law firm Tedford & Miles from 1873 to 1879. From 1891 to 1901, he was a judge on the district court, prior to returning to private practice with the firm Tedford & Carter in Corydon.
