= Netcott-Pfeiffer House =

Historic house in Iowa, United States

- U.S. National Register of Historic Places
- Location within Iowa Location within the United States
- Location: 206 Buswell St. Parkersburg, Iowa
- Coordinates: 42°34′37″N 92°47′29″W
- Area: less than one acre
- Built: 1894
- Built by: George Netcott, Jr. George A. Netcott
- Architect: Harry E. Netcott
- Architectural style: Italianate
- NRHP reference No.: 07000347
- Added to NRHP: April 24, 2007

Netcott-Pfeiffer House is a historic building located in Parkersburg, Iowa, United States. The Italianate style double house was built in 1894 by George Netcott, Jr. and his son George A. Netcott. Harry E. Netcott, another of George Jr.'s sons, is believed to have designed the house. George A. Netcott sold the house in 1896 to Gustavus A. Pfeiffer, a pharmacist, and his brother Paul, a local banker and land baron. The brothers, who were also humanitarians and philanthropists, lived here together with their families until Gustavus moved to St. Louis in 1901. Paul's daughter Pauline was a journalist and the second wife of Ernest Hemingway. She lived in the house from 1896 to 1901. The house is also associated with physicist Edwin Thompson Jaynes, who lived here from 1929 to 1942 with his mother after his father's death. The house was listed on the National Register of Historic Places in 2007.
