= John and Mary Jane Kyte Farmstead District =

Historic district in Iowa, United States

- John and Mary Jane Kyte; Farmstead District
- U.S. National Register of Historic Places
- U.S. Historic district
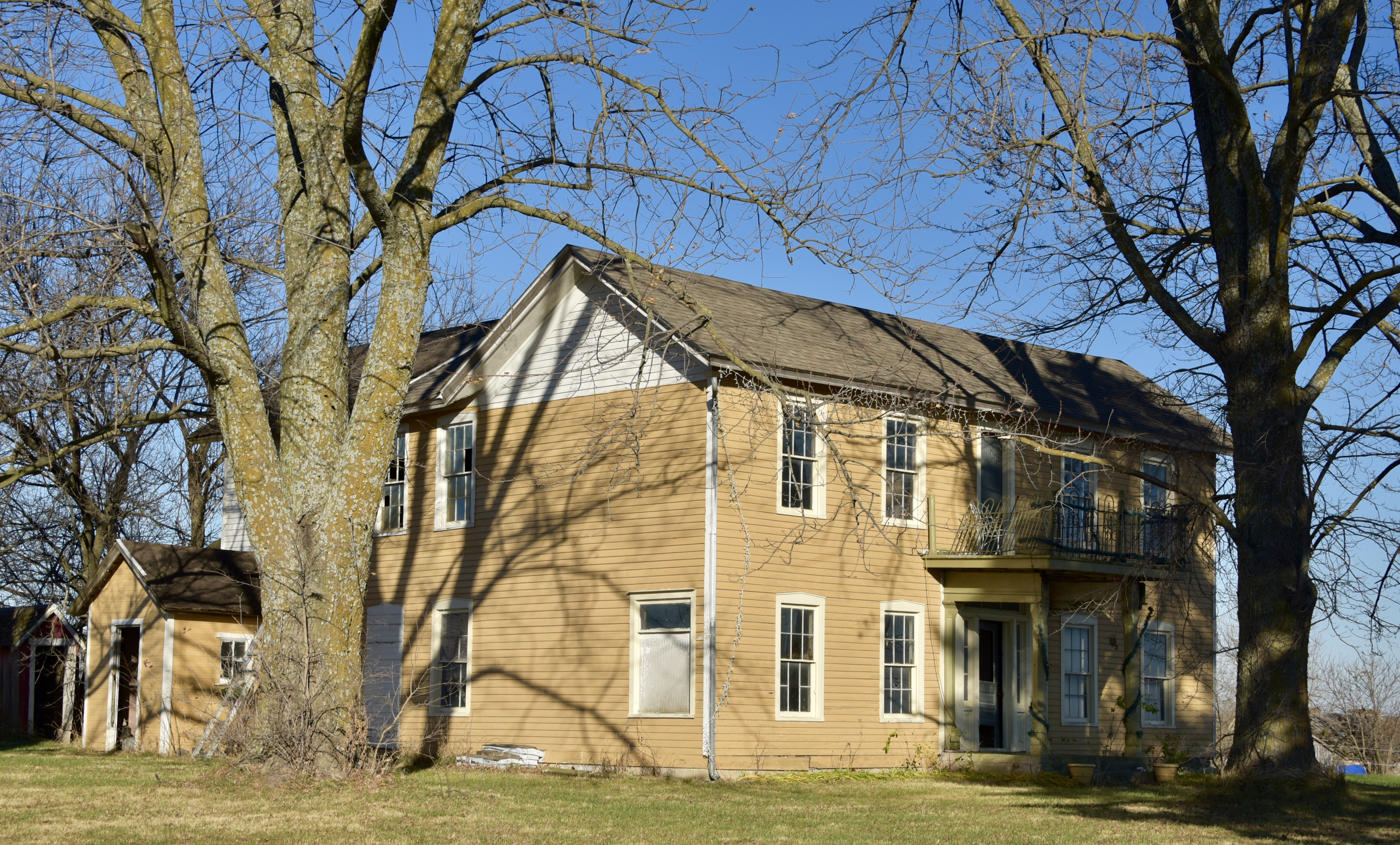
- The 1856 farmhouse.

- Location within Iowa Location within the United States
- Location: 2875 Mormon Trail Rd.
- Nearest city: Weldon, Iowa
- Coordinates: 40°56′09″N 93°39′22″W
- Area: 9 acres (3.6 ha)
- Architectural style: Greek Revival; Heavy Timber Frame Barn
- NRHP reference No.: 00001074
- Added to NRHP: September 14, 2000

The John and Mary Jane Kyte Farmstead District is an agricultural historic district located northeast of Weldon, Iowa, United States. At the time of its nomination it included four contributing buildings and four non-contributing buildings. The significance of the district is attributed to its being a well preserved early settlement era farmstead. The contributing buildings include the 1856 Greek Revival house, the late 1850s or 1860s heavy timber frame barn, the chicken house, and the privy. The district was listed on the National Register of Historic Places in 2000.
