= Schultz Brothers Drug Store =

- U.S. National Register of Historic Places
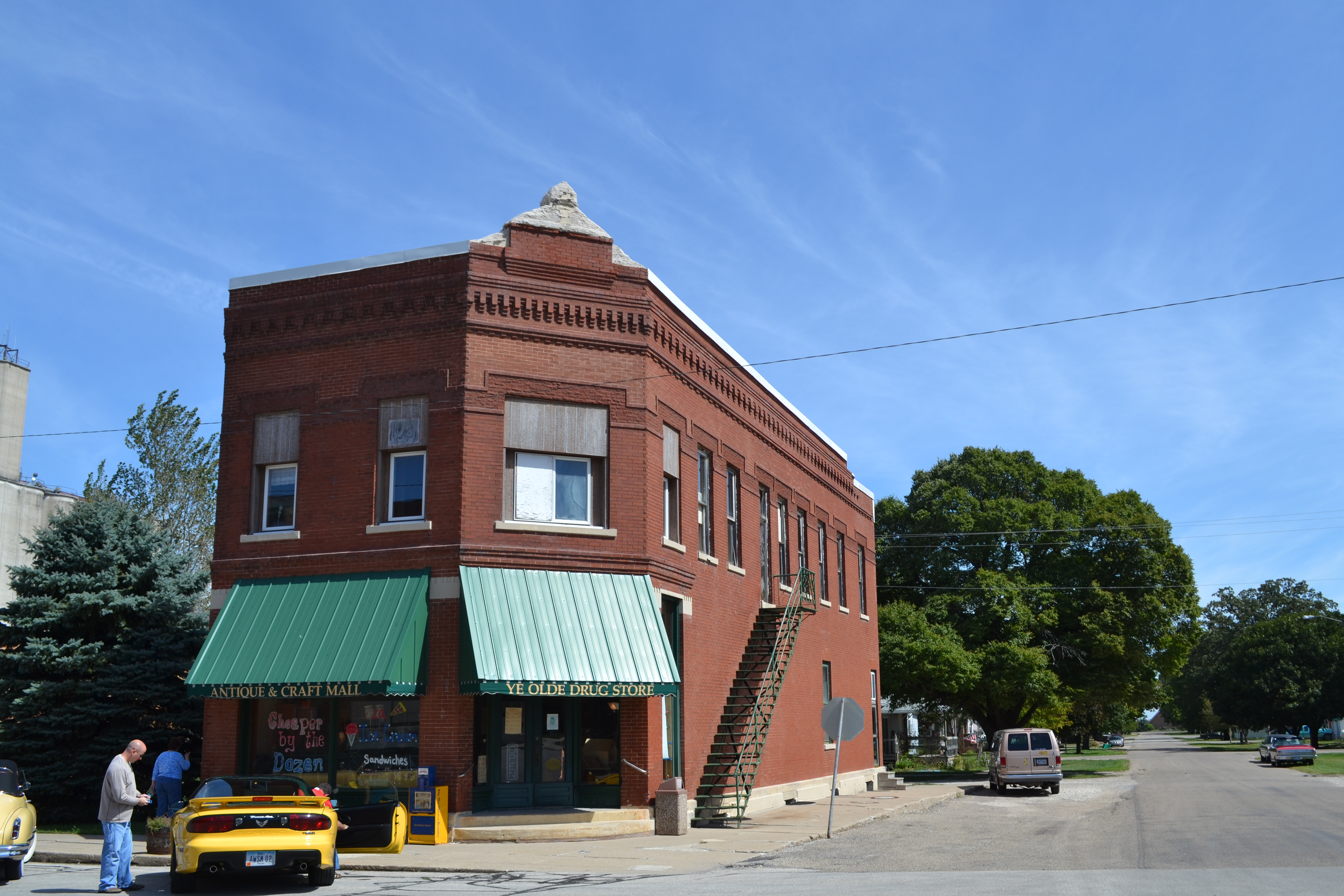

- Location within Iowa Location within the United States
- Location: 116 Main St. Williams, Iowa
- Coordinates: 42°29′18″N 93°32′39″W
- Area: less than one acre
- Built: 1901
- Built by: E.D. Curtis
- Architectural style: Late Victorian
- NRHP reference No.: 96000518
- Added to NRHP: May 16, 1996

The Schultz Brothers Drug Store, also known as Ye Olde Drug Store, is a historic building located in Williams, Iowa, United States. W.B. and O.W. Schultz bought this property in 1897 and had the building constructed in 1901. The Late Victorian structure was built by E.D. Curtis of Hampton, Iowa. The Schultz brothers moved their expanded drug store into the building in September 1901. The two-story brick building has commercial space on the first floor and two apartments on the second floor. The business was sold to Donald O'Neill in 1915, and he added a soda fountain. After 1959 the building no longer housed a pharmacy. At some point the building was left vacant until 1992, after which it was converted into an ice cream shop. The building was listed on the National Register of Historic Places in 1996.
