= William C. and Hertha Dau House =

Historic house in Iowa, United States

- U.S. National Register of Historic Places
- Location within Iowa Location within the United States
- Location: 315 S. Dodge St. Algona, Iowa
- Coordinates: 43°03′58″N 94°14′11″W
- Area: less than one acre
- Built: 1937
- Built by: George L. Miller
- Architect: Oswald Thorson
- Architectural style: Art Moderne; International Style
- NRHP reference No.: 93000654
- Added to NRHP: July 29, 1993

The William C. and Hertha Dau House is a historic residence located in Algona, Iowa, United States. The Dau's attended the 1933 Chicago World's Fair and were impressed with the "Model Homes of Tomorrow" exhibition. William Dau drew sketches of what he wanted in a house when he returned home. The Dau's bought the property in 1936 and had the existing two-story house moved to another location. They hired Forest City, Iowa architect Oswald Thorson who designed the house in a combination of the Art Moderne and International Style. It was his first commission to design a house. The two-story frame structure has an exterior covered with tan brick veneer. The irregular-plan house was built on a reinforced concrete foundation and capped with a flat roof. The Art Moderne style is found in the relatively smooth walls, asymmetrical facades, a curved exterior wall on the first floor, bands of glass block windows, round windows, and window bands that turn corners. The house's horizontal orientation is emphasized by the horizontal lines in the brick walls and horizontal balustrade. The International style is found in the variety of lines, textures, and forms that are typical of the style. It was listed on the National Register of Historic Places in 1993.
