= Dickinson Webster House =

Historic house in Iowa, United States

- U.S. National Register of Historic Places
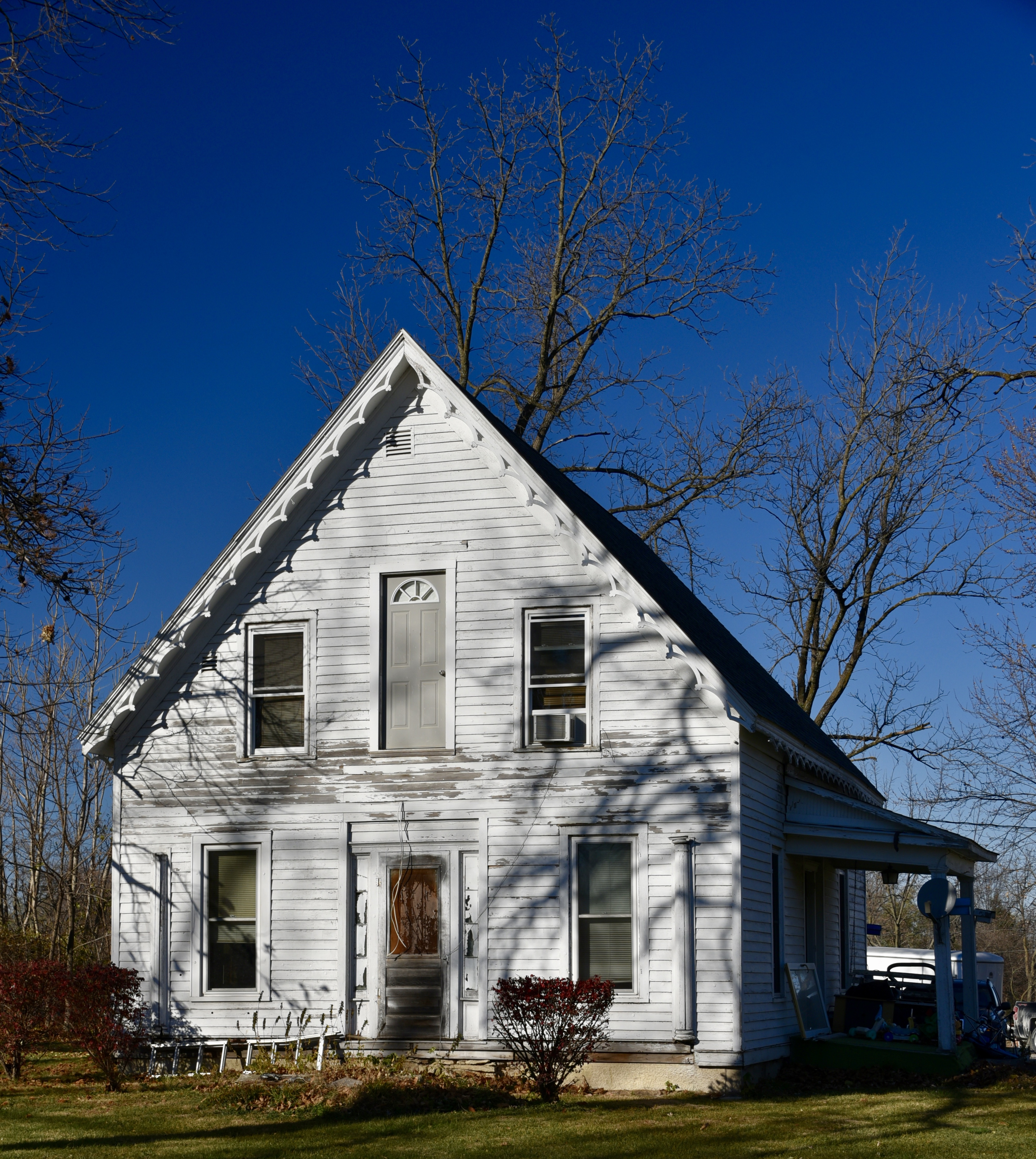

- Location within Iowa Location within the United States
- Location: 609 W. Jefferson St. Osceola, Iowa
- Coordinates: 41°02′02″N 93°46′27″W
- Area: less than one acre
- Built: c. 1860
- NRHP reference No.: 77000501
- Added to NRHP: July 20, 1977

The Dickinson Webster House is a historic residence located in Osceola, Iowa, United States. The Webster family moved from Delaware and settled in Franklin Township, Clarke County, Iowa in 1851. They were among the earliest settlers in the county. Dickinson Webster, Jr. moved to Osceola in 1854, and built this house about 1860. He owned 900 acres (360 ha) of farmland, and established a nursery in 1869. The 16-by-26-foot (4.9 by 7.9 m) frame structure follows a rectangular plan, and is capped with a gable roof. Ornate millwork and classical influences in the porch columns adds decorative elements to an otherwise simple house. The house was listed on the National Register of Historic Places in 1996.
