= Noah Odell House =

Historic house in Iowa, United States

- Formerly listed on the U.S. National Register of Historic Places
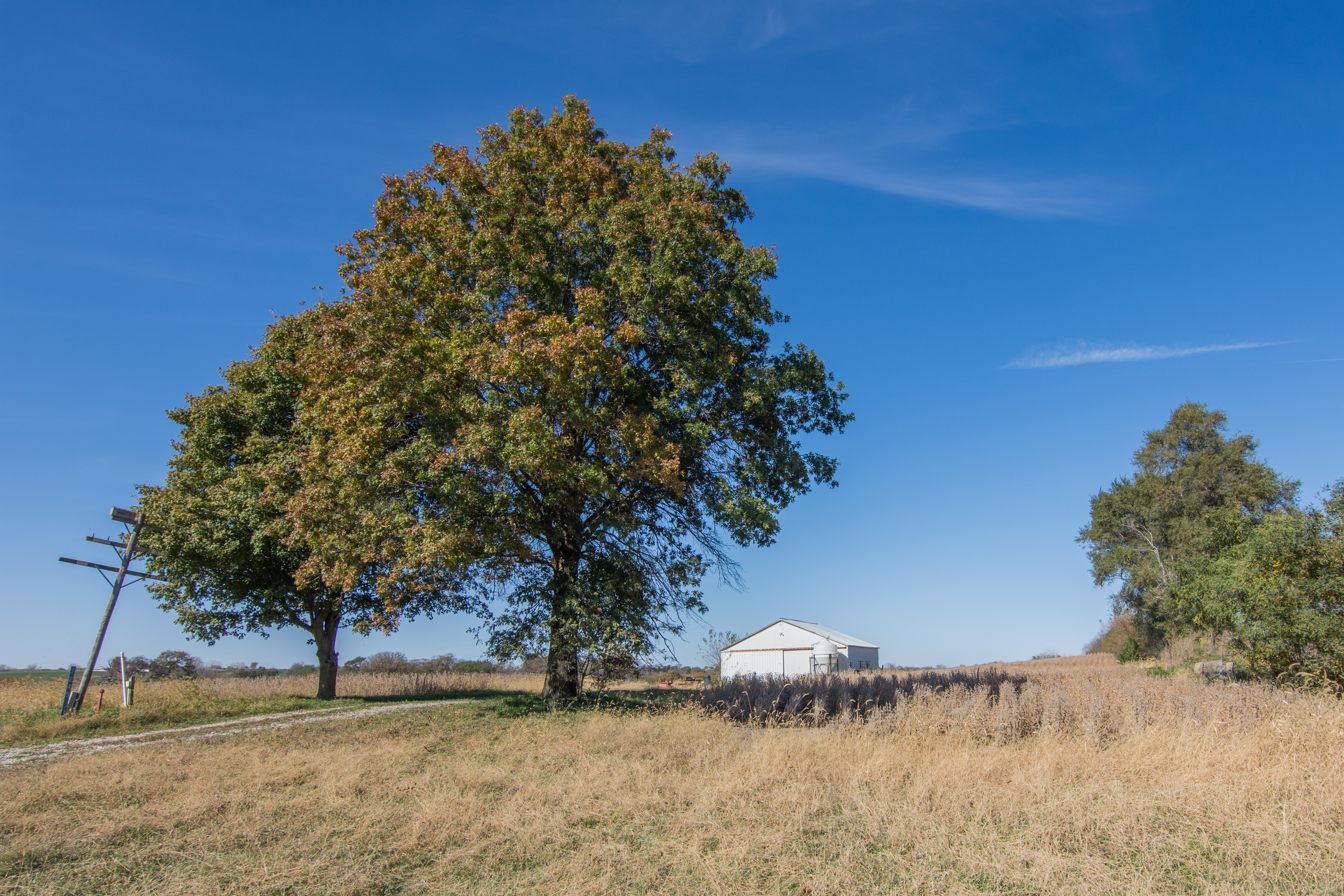
- The site of the Noah Odell House in 2016

- Location within Iowa Location within the United States
- Location: 1245 240th St.
- Nearest city: Nodaway, Iowa
- Coordinates: 40°57′33″N 94°52′54″W
- Area: less than one acre
- Built: 1858
- Built by: Noah Odell
- NRHP reference No.: 00000917

Significant dates
- Added to NRHP: November 30, 2000
- Removed from NRHP: January 24, 2022

The Noah Odell House, also known as the Gilbert Rider House and the Wayside Inn, was a historic building located northeast of Nodaway, Iowa, United States. Odell is credited with building the I-house in 1858. It was significant as the only known example of the heavy frame I-house residential construction type in Adams County. It is also believed that the house served as a stop on a stagecoach route, and it is possible that the house was a stop on the Underground Railroad, or at the very least that Odell was active in assisting runaway slaves. The house was listed on the National Register of Historic Places (NRHP) in 2000. It was subsequently torn down and removed from the NRHP in 2022.
