= C.S. Stearns House =

Historic house in Iowa, United States

- U.S. National Register of Historic Places
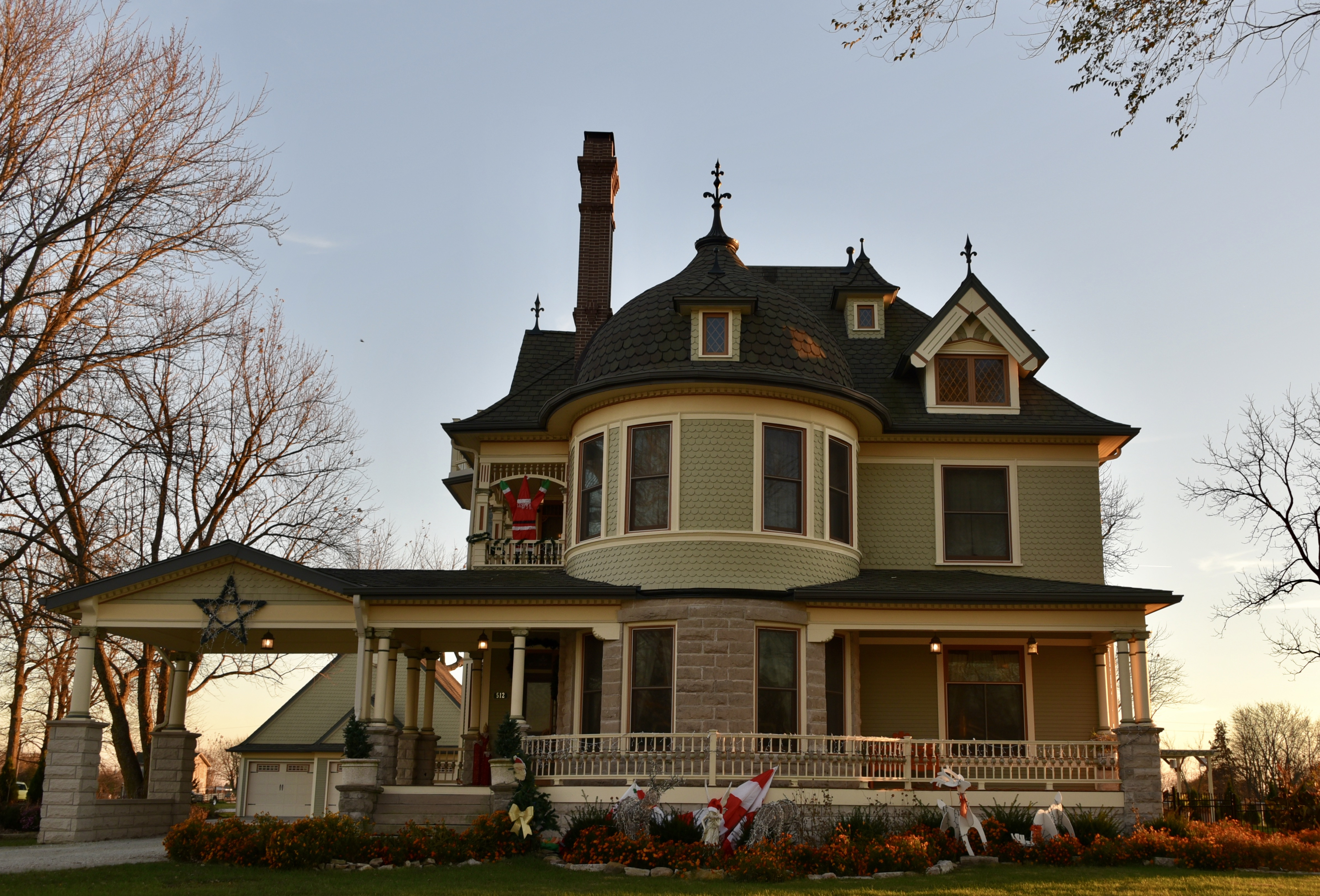

- Location within Iowa Location within the United States
- Location: Main St. Garden Grove, Iowa
- Coordinates: 40°49′36″N 93°36′10″W
- Area: 2 acres (0.81 ha)
- Built: 1885
- Architectural style: Queen Anne
- NRHP reference No.: 78001214
- Added to NRHP: November 28, 1978

The C.S. Stearns House is a historic structure located in Garden Grove, Iowa, United States. Stearns was a local merchant and banker who was involved with C.S. Stearns & Bros. and the First National Bank. The house is an example of the vernacular Queen Anne style that was popular among the prominent citizens of Iowa's small towns toward the end of the 19th century. It features an irregular plan, a cluttered roofscape, a variety of surface textures, tall chimneys with decorative brickwork, and a prominent semicircular bay on the main facade. The house was added to the National Register of Historic Places in 1978.
