= George H. and Alice Spaulding Cowles House =

Historic house in Iowa, United States

- U.S. National Register of Historic Places
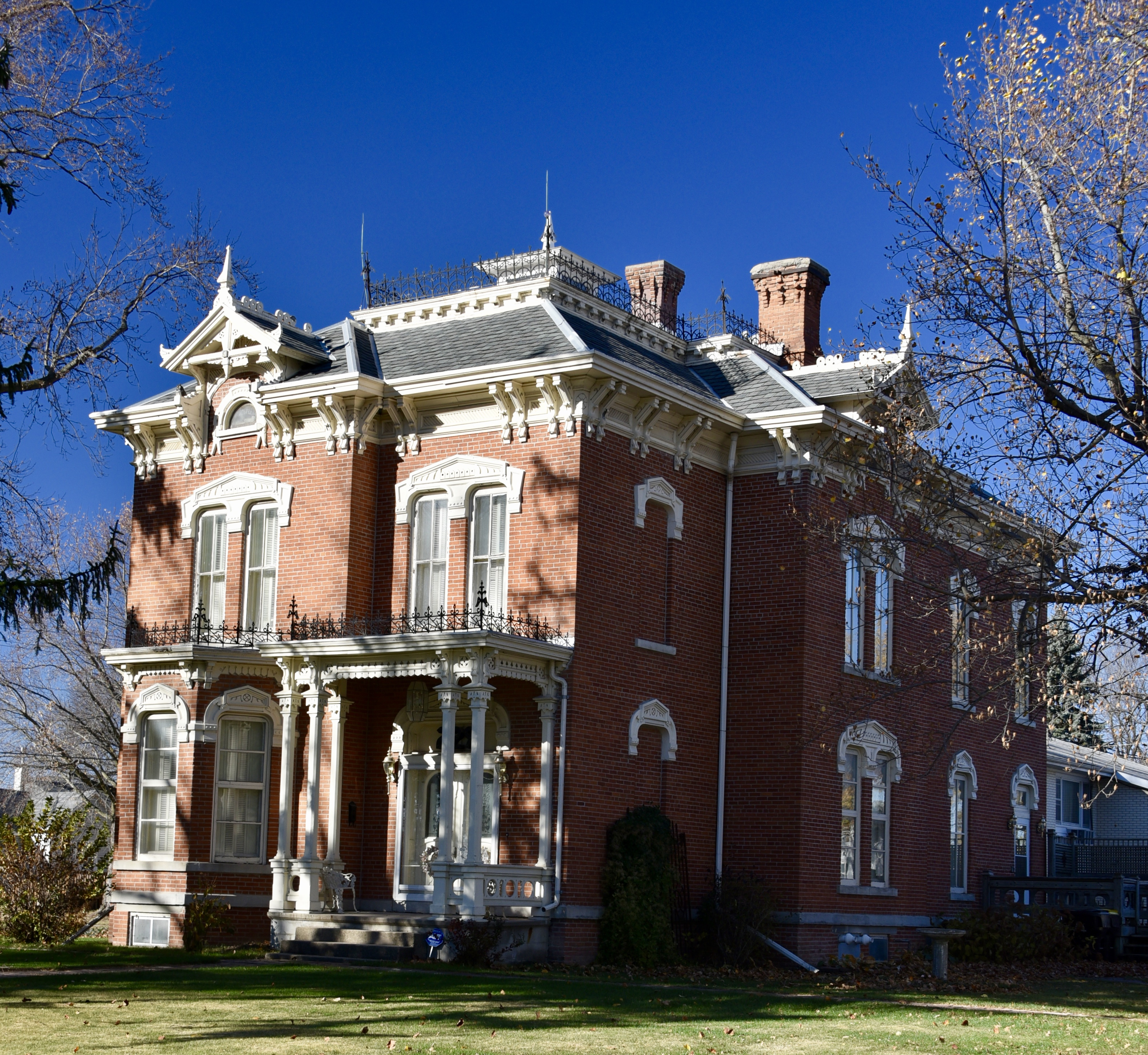

- Location within Iowa Location within the United States
- Location: 229 W. Cass St. Osceola, Iowa
- Coordinates: 41°01′57″N 93°46′09″W
- Area: less than one acre
- Built: 1875
- Architectural style: Italianate
- NRHP reference No.: 06001161
- Added to NRHP: December 20, 2006

The George H. and Alice Spaulding Cowles House is a historic building located in Osceola, Iowa, United States. George Cowles was a native of Bentonsport, Iowa who came to Osceola in 1869, and married Alice Spaulding in 1871. He was a banker. The house was also owned by a local physician and his wife, Dr. Jason and Mary F.Q. Roberts. It is an example of a high style, architect-designed Italianate residence. Its architect, however, is unknown. The two-story brick structure follows a rectangular plan, and is capped with a hipped roof and a cupola. It features shallow side wings, single story bays, porches on the front and sides of the structure, small gabled dormers at the roof line on the front and side elevations, and two large brick chimneys with decorative brick venting caps. The house was listed on the National Register of Historic Places in 2006.
