= William J. and Hattie J. Zitterell House =

Historic house in Iowa, United States

- U.S. National Register of Historic Places
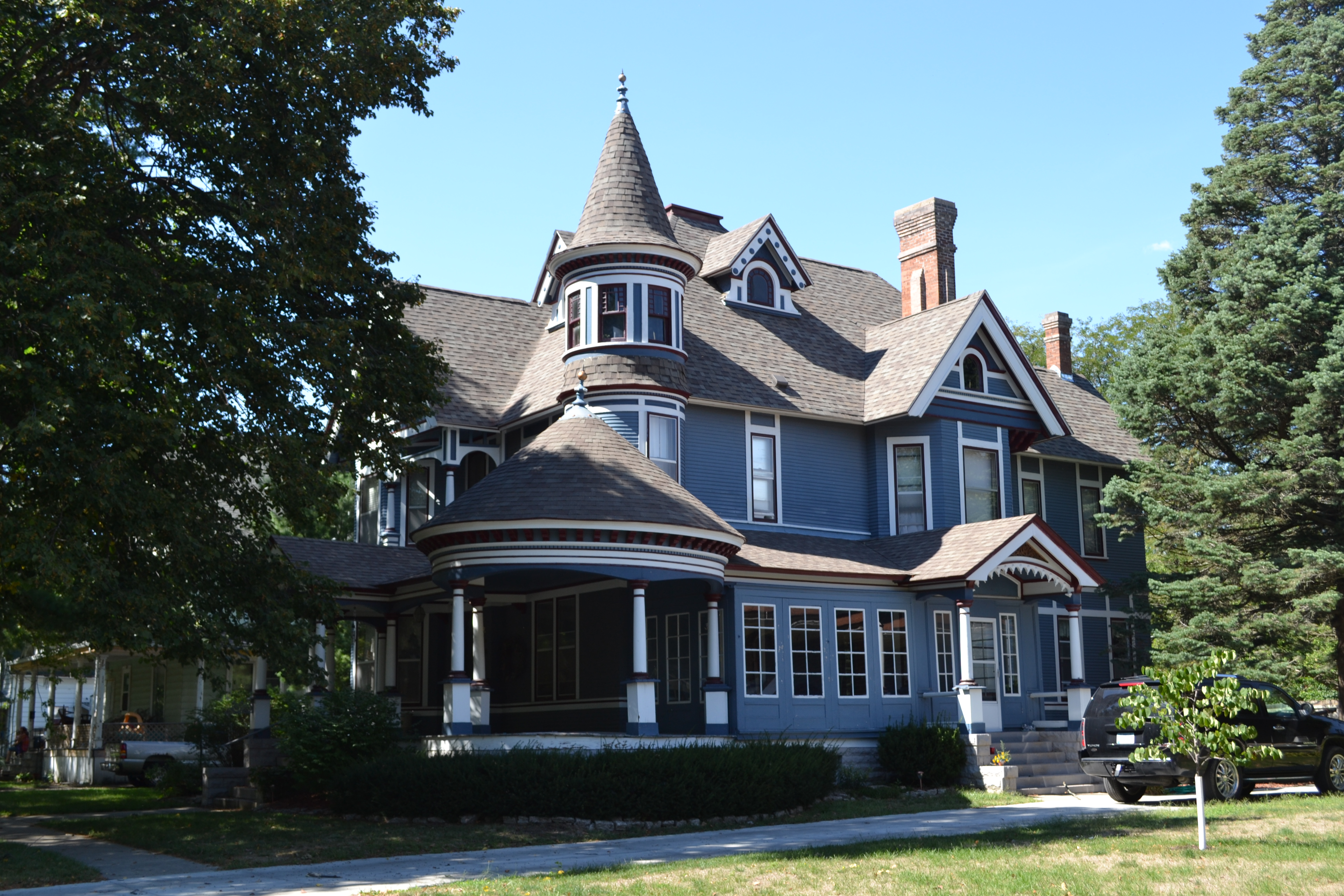

- Location within Iowa Location within the United States
- Location: 821 Division St. Webster City, Iowa
- Coordinates: 42°28′04″N 93°49′29″W
- Area: less than one acre
- Built: 1901
- Built by: W.J. Zitterell
- Architectural style: Queen Anne
- NRHP reference No.: 96000057
- Added to NRHP: February 16, 1996

The William J. and Hattie J. Zitterell House is a historic residence located in Webster City, Iowa, United States. Zitterell was a general contractor, and he served as president of the Iowa Master Builders Association twice. He built his Queen Anne-style house that was completed in 1901. The two-story frame structure features three porches, a balcony, and a corner tower with a conical roof. There is a gazebo-like projection on the wrap-around porch. The main block is capped with a hipped roof with four gables. It was listed on the National Register of Historic Places in 1982.
