= State Bank of Stratford =

- U.S. National Register of Historic Places
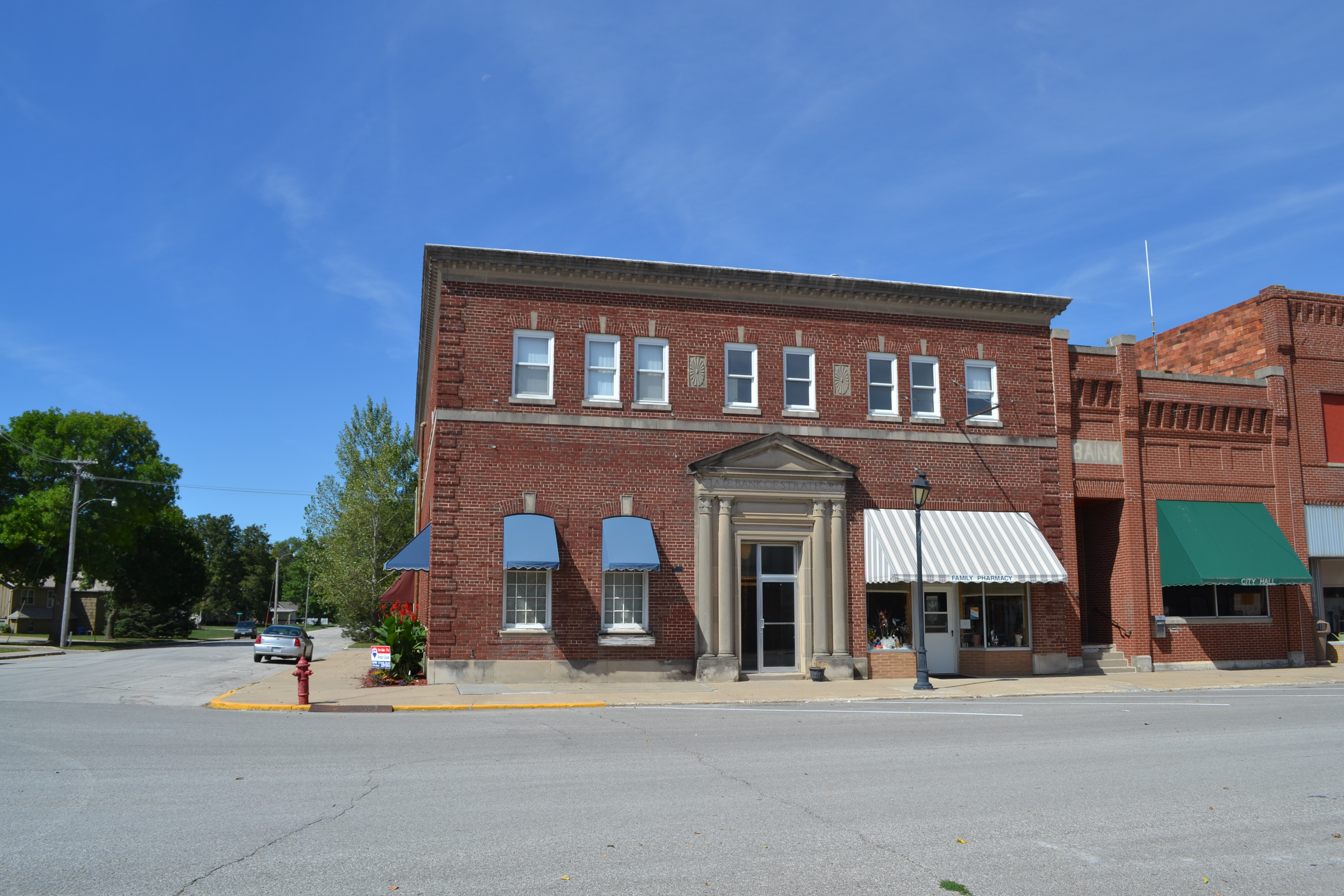

- Location within Iowa Location within the United States
- Location: 801 Shakespeare St. Stratford, Iowa
- Coordinates: 42°16′14″N 93°55′39″W
- Area: less than one acre
- Built: 1917-1918
- Built by: John Neuzil
- Architect: Byron J. Boyd; Herbert Moore
- Architectural style: Georgian Revival
- NRHP reference No.: 83000362
- Added to NRHP: July 7, 1983

The State Bank of Stratford is a historic building located in Stratford, Iowa, United States. The bank opened for business in 1891, eight years after the town was incorporated. Its early success reflected the prosperity in rural Iowa at the time. The bank occupied this corner since 1910, and this building was completed in 1918. The older building was relocated to the west, and it is still extant. It survived the agricultural economic downturn of the 1920s, but it could not survive the Great Depression. The bank building was purchased in 1936 by the Farmer's Savings Bank, which operated in this building until a new bank building was built across the street to the south. The Georgian Revival elements of the building include the pedimented entrance portico, elliptical arched windows, the brick quoining on the corners, and the dentilated cornice. The building was listed on the National Register of Historic Places in 1983.
