= Adams County Jail (Corning, Iowa) =

- U.S. National Register of Historic Places
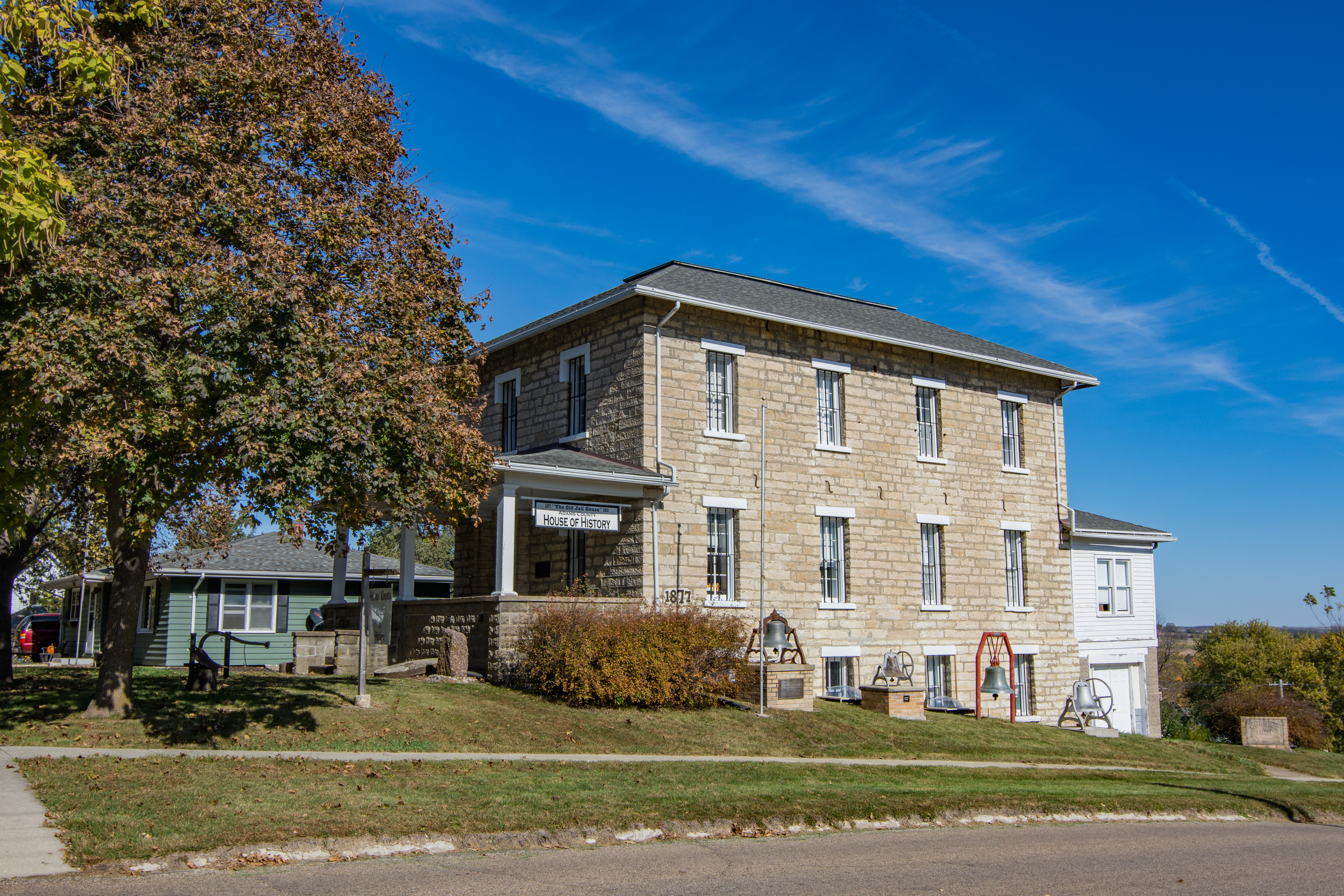

- Location within Iowa Location within the United States
- Location: 1000 Benton Ave. Corning, Iowa
- Coordinates: 40°59′31″N 94°44′05″W
- Area: less than one acre
- Built: 1877
- Architectural style: Greek Revival
- NRHP reference No.: 91000119
- Added to NRHP: February 28, 1991

The former Adams County Jail, also known as the House of History: Adams County Historical Society, is located in Corning, Iowa, United States. The limestone structure was built in 1877, and it mimicked the adjacent frame courthouse (no longer extant). The two-story rectangular building is a Vernacular style structure with Greek Revival influence. It is capped with a hipped roof and a flat crest. It served the county for the next 78 years as its jailhouse. The building also provided residential space on the lower level to the sheriff, or if he had his own house, to the jailer. The upper floor held the cells. The most notable event at the jail was the lynching of local farmer John W. McKenzie in 1887, who had shot his neighbor. The building was converted into apartments in 1955, and a museum in 1969. It listed on the National Register of Historic Places in 1991.
