= South Ward School (Cresco, Iowa) =

- Formerly listed on the U.S. National Register of Historic Places
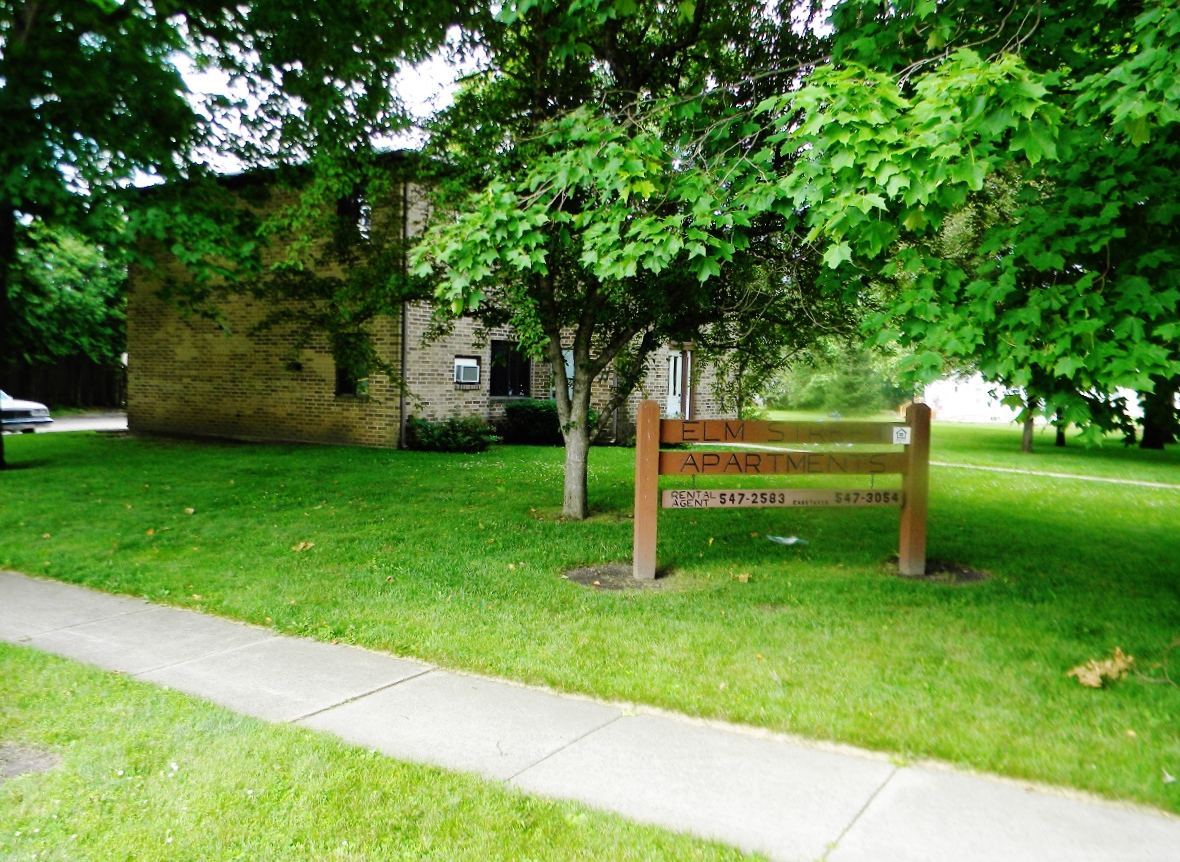
- The apartment that replaced the school building

- Location within Iowa Location within the United States
- Location: 500 S. Elm St. Cresco, Iowa
- Coordinates: 43°22′03″N 92°07′02″W
- Area: less than one acre
- Built: 1896
- Architect: James Byrne
- Architectural style: Late Victorian; Romanesque
- NRHP reference No.: 82000408

Significant dates
- Added to NRHP: November 10, 1982
- Removed from NRHP: September 19, 2019

The South Ward School was a historic building located in Cresco, Iowa, United States. It served as a grade school from 1897 to 1978. Because of low enrollment it was not used from 1949 to 1953. The 2½-story brick structure was built on a raised limestone basement, and it was capped with a hipped roof. It was significant as a good example of late Victorian-style school buildings with Romanesque influences. It was listed on the National Register of Historic Places in 1982. The school building has subsequently been torn down and replaced with a modern apartment building. It was removed from the NRHP in September of the same year.
