= John Cretsinger House =

Historic house in Iowa, United States

- U.S. National Register of Historic Places
- Location within Iowa Location within the United States
- Location: 1363 Burl Ln.
- Nearest city: Coon Rapids, Iowa
- Coordinates: 41°48′46″N 94°42′52″W
- Area: less than one acre
- Built: 1853
- Built by: Benjamin and Joseph Tuttle
- NRHP reference No.: 98001206
- Added to NRHP: October 7, 1998

The John Cretsinger House is a historic building located south of Coon Rapids, Iowa, United States. Benjamin and Joseph Tuttle came from Hancock County, Illinois and built this structure in 1853. John Cretsinger built the lean-to kitchen sometime after 1867. The original 1½-story house is 19 by 23 feet (5.8 by 7.0 m) and the kitchen is 8 by 22 feet (2.4 by 6.7 m). The cabin is located on a north slope surrounded by timber. It is a rare example of an original log cabin in western Iowa. The house was listed on the National Register of Historic Places in 1998.
