= Lu Verne City Jail =

- U.S. National Register of Historic Places
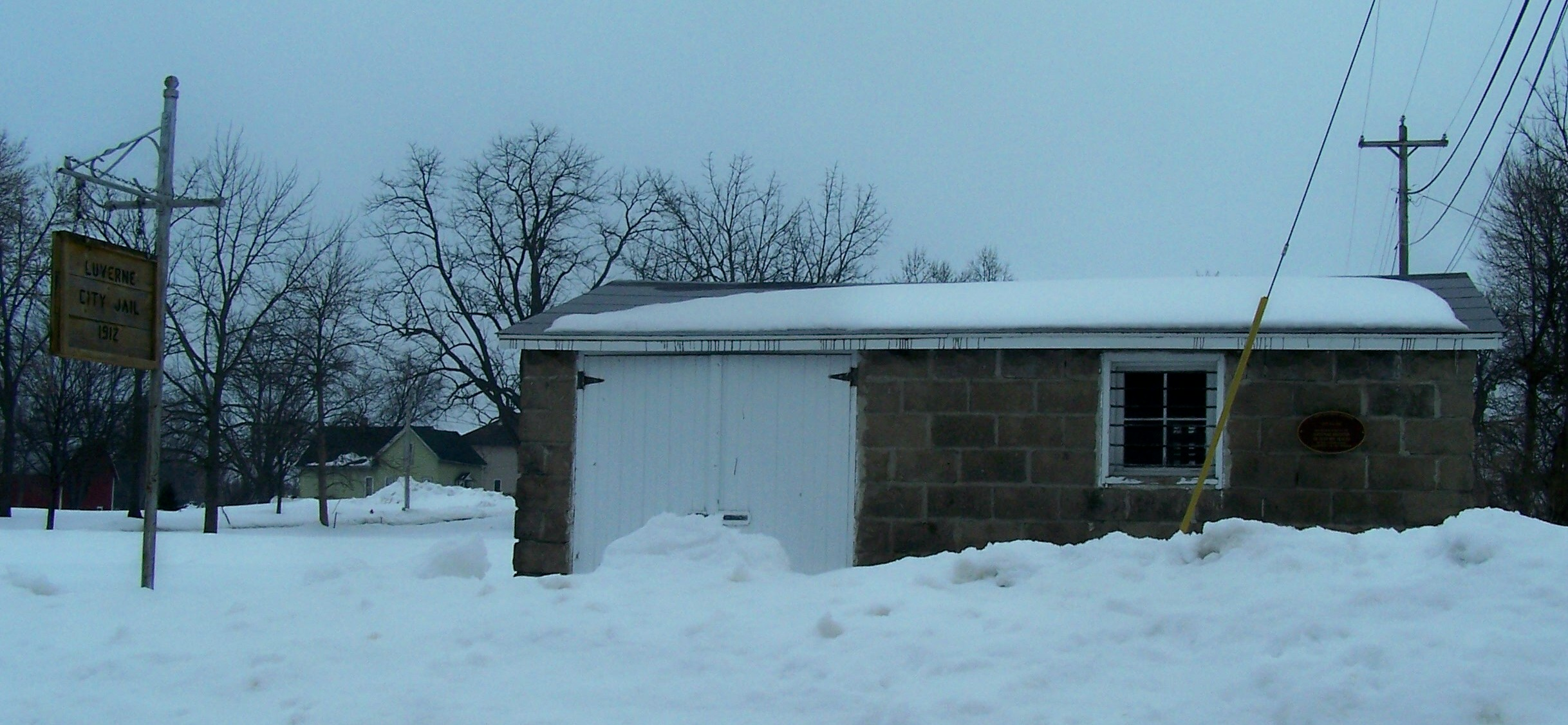
- The former jail building in Lu Verne

- Location within Iowa Location within the United States
- Location: 307 3rd St. Lu Verne, Iowa
- Coordinates: 42°54′40″N 94°05′01″W
- Area: less than one acre
- Built: 1912
- Built by: C. Black
- NRHP reference No.: 92001662
- Added to NRHP: December 18, 1992

The Lu Verne City Jail, also known as the Old Calaboose, is a historic building located in Lu Verne, Iowa, United States. The city built its first jail in 1899. On May 6, 1912, they decided to build the current structure at the same location. They sold the old building, and C. Black completed the new 14-by-20-foot (4.3 by 6.1 m) structure for $181.15. The single-story building is composed of concrete blocks that were cast to resemble cut stone. E.T. Barnum Ironworks of Detroit, Michigan provided the parts for the cells. The jail housed short-term offenders, usually those who were inebriated, committed petty crimes, and later hobos. The building also housed the fire department's hose cart. It served as a jail until 1934 when a new city hall was built. The jail cells were moved there at that time, and this building housed a welding shop sometime after that. The jail cells were returned to this building in 1975, and it is maintained by the Lu Verne Historical Society. It was listed on the National Register of Historic Places in 1992.
