= Chris Neessen House =

Historic house in Iowa, United States

- U.S. National Register of Historic Places
- Location within Iowa Location within the United States
- Location: 601 E. 4th St. Wellsburg, Iowa
- Coordinates: 42°26′04″N 92°55′22″W
- Area: less than one acre
- Built: 1916
- Built by: Mylon Alexander Rohrbacher
- Architect: Howard Bowman Burr
- Architectural style: Prairie School
- NRHP reference No.: 84001253
- Added to NRHP: January 12, 1984

The Chris Neessen House is a historic building located in Wellsburg, Iowa, United States. Christopher Neessen (1864–1944) immigrated from Germany in 1880 and became a farmer, land owner, and local banker. He hired Howard Bowman Burr, an architect from Waterloo, Iowa, to design this Prairie School house that was completed in 1916. The garage was built to the northeast of the house the following year. They were constructed by local builder Mylon Alexander Rohrbacher. The two-story brick house follows an irregular plan and measures 68 by 56 feet (21 by 17 m). It is located on an elevated corner lot. The house was listed on the National Register of Historic Places in 1984.
