= Cresco Opera House =

- U.S. National Register of Historic Places
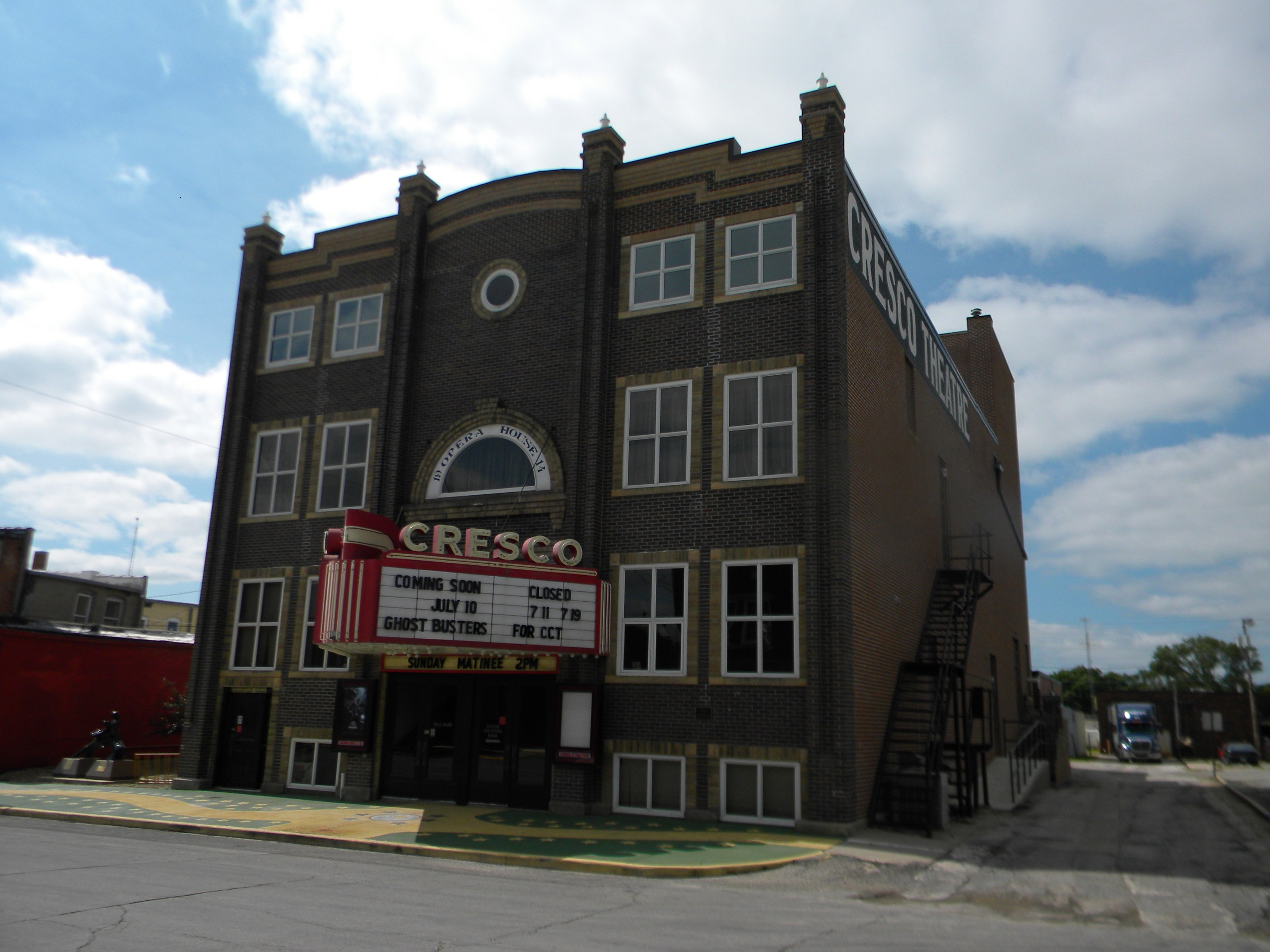

- Location within Iowa Location within the United States
- Location: 115 2nd Ave. W. Cresco, Iowa
- Coordinates: 43°22′25″N 92°07′02″W
- Area: less than one acre
- Built: 1914
- Built by: Martin Johnson
- Architect: Joseph Howe
- Architectural style: Prairie School
- NRHP reference No.: 81000245
- Added to NRHP: August 27, 1981

The Cresco Opera House, also known as the Cresco Theater, is a historic building located in Cresco, Iowa, United States. The first known theater in Cresco was the Lyric Hall, which opened in 1875. It showed the first movies around 1900. The Family and the Cozy theaters opened around the turn of the century. The Lyric was condemned and torn down in 1913, and the other two were considered substandard. The Cresco Commercial Club held a fundraiser in early 1914 to build an opera house. The Cresco Opera House Company was organized around the same time. The building was completed by the end of the year, and it opened in 1915. It was designed by local engineer Joseph H. Howe, and constructed by local builder Martin Johnson. The musical High Jinks was the first performance held in the theater. The theater, which seats 425, was equipped to show movies and there was a community hall in the basement. It was listed on the National Register of Historic Places in 1981. There are local legends surrounding the Theater, some go as far as to claiming it's one of the most haunted buildings in the State. Apparitions of early 20th-century entertainers have been reported on stage, seemingly acting out their old routines. Witnesses have frequently spotted a solitary man sitting in the dark theater seats. Whenever staff or visitors try to approach him, he vanishes completely. On the upper levels and near the old catwalk, people have reported the chilling sound of a woman screaming, despite nobody being upstairs. (In 1914 or 1915 someone fell off the catwalk.) Disembodied footsteps are frequently heard pacing in the upper costume room (the former apartment above the lobby) and balcony after hours. Faint, inexplicable music has also been recorded after the final movie credits roll. The theater experiences frequent, unexplainable flickering of lights, phantom equipment disruptions, and moving objects, particularly in the basement and projection areas The venue embraced its reputation by hosting public paranormal events, including the May 2026 "Echoes of Cresco Theatre: A Psychic Experience". The theater is even available for private paranormal group rentals under staff supervision.
