= List of Carnegie libraries in Iowa =

: public,: academic,: multiple (hover to identify places)

The following list of Carnegie libraries in Iowa provides detailed information on United States Carnegie libraries in Iowa, where 101 public libraries were built from 99 grants (totaling $1,495,706) awarded by the Carnegie Corporation of New York from 1892 to 1917. In addition, academic libraries were built at 7 institutions (totaling $210,000).

== Key ==
Building still operating as a library
Building no longer standing
Building standing, but now serving another purpose
Building listed on the National Register of Historic Places
Building contributes to a historic district on the National Register of Historic Places

== Public libraries ==
	Library	City or town	Image	Date granted	Grant amount	Location	Remarks
1	Albia	Albia		Apr 11, 1905	$10,000	203 E. Benton Ave. 41°01′40″N 92°48′21″W	Opened March 21, 1906.
2	Alden	Alden		Nov 3, 1913	$9,000	1012 Water St. 42°31′12″N 93°22′28″W	This is the smallest community in the United States to be granted a Carnegie library, with a population of just 699 in 1900. A Wetherell and Gage design in the Beaux-Arts style, it was opened August 26, 1914.
3	Algona	Algona		Mar 27, 1903	$10,000	110 E. Nebraska St. 43°04′07″N 94°14′12″W	This Patton and Miller of Chicago design is now a private business. It was in use as a library from March 25, 1905 until 1983.
4	Ames	Ames		Feb 2, 1903	$16,000	515 Douglas Ave. 42°01′36″N 93°36′44″W	Opened October 20, 1904, this building has been expanded twice to accommodate growing demand. It was designed by Hawlett and Rawson of Des Moines.
5	Atlantic	Atlantic		Mar 14, 1902	$12,500	507 Poplar St. 41°24′20″N 95°00′52″W	Opened December 28, 1903.
6	Audubon	Audubon		Mar 29, 1911	$9,000	401 N. Park Pl. 41°43′20″N 94°55′54″W	Dedicated on December 3, 1912.
7	Bedford	Bedford		Apr 8, 1907	$10,000	507 Jefferson St. 40°40′07″N 94°43′13″W	Dedicated on January 25, 1916 and opened on January 26, 1916.
8	Bloomfield	Bloomfield		Nov 21, 1911	$10,000	107 N. Columbia St. 40°45′09″N 92°24′59″W	Opened August 8, 1913, this building was designed by Wetherall and Gage of Des Moines.
9	Britt	Britt		Mar 31, 1916	$8,000		Dedicated June 20, 1918, this building was razed in 1968.
10	Carroll	Carroll		Feb 12, 1903	$10,000	123 E. 6th St. 42°03′58″N 94°52′01″W	Dedicated September 2, 1905, this building is now the Carroll County Historical Museum.
11	Cedar Falls	Cedar Falls		Mar 14, 1902	$15,000	Main St. & W. 6th St. 42°32′00″N 92°26′44″W	Dedicated on September 24, 1903, this building housed the library for Cedar Falls until 2004, when it was demolished for construction of a new library.
12	Cedar Rapids	Cedar Rapids		Feb 19, 1901	$75,000	410 3rd Ave. SE; 41°58′44″N 91°39′52″W	Now the Cedar Rapids Museum of Art, this Josselyn and Taylor building opened on June 23, 1905 and served as the library until 1985.
13	Chariton	Chariton		Jan 13, 1903	$11,000	803 Braden Ave. 41°00′58″N 93°18′18″W	A Patton and Miller work, this building opened October 28, 1904.
14	Charles City	Charles City		Jan 2, 1903	$12,500	301 N. Jackson St. 43°04′09″N 92°40′45″W	Now the Charles City Art Center, this library opened November 24, 1904 and was designed by Patton and Miller.
15	Cherokee	Cherokee		Jan 6, 1903	$12,000	215 S. 2nd St. 42°45′03″N 95°33′05″W	Dedicated May 2, 1905, this building was designed by Wetherall and Gage.
16	Clarinda	Clarinda		Feb 21, 1907	$15,000	300 N. 16th St. 40°44′27″N 95°02′16″W	Dedicated April 15, 1909, this building served the city until 2004 and now houses an art museum.
17	Clear Lake	Clear Lake		Mar 31, 1916	$8,500	200 N. 4th St. 43°08′19″N 93°22′57″W	Opened June 7, 1918, this library was expanded in 2002 by adjoining with a neighboring building.
18	Clinton	Clinton		Aug 24, 1901	$45,000	306 8th Ave. S. 41°50′18″N 90°11′28″W	Opened November 8, 1904, this building was designed by Patton and Miller.
19	Colfax	Colfax		Dec 2, 1904	$6,500	25 W. Division St. 41°40′40″N 93°14′44″W	Opened May 14, 1913.
20	Corydon	Corydon		Nov 7, 1917	$8,000	102 N. DeKalb St. 40°45′28″N 93°19′13″W	Dedicated June 20, 1919, this was the final Carnegie library granted and opened in Iowa. It was designed by Proudfoot, Bird, and Rawson of Des Moines and used until August 12, 1977; the building is now a school.
21	Council Bluffs	Council Bluffs		Jan 6, 1903	$70,000	200 Pearl St. S. 41°15′32″N 95°51′04″W	Opened on September 12, 1905, this Beaux-Arts building was the Council Bluffs library until 1998, when it was extensively renovated and became the Union Pacific Railroad Museum. It was the largest of the 17 Carnegie libraries Patton and Miller designed in Iowa.
22	Cresco	Cresco		Feb 13, 1913	$17,500	320 N. Elm St. 43°22′29″N 92°06′59″W	Dedicated February 10, 1915, this building by local architect J.H. Howe is unusual among Carnegie libraries for resulting from a community grant—Cresco joined with six additional townships to receive its grant.
23	Davenport	Davenport		Dec 2, 1899	$75,000	399 N. Main St. 41°31′27″N 90°34′32″W	This Calvin Kiessling design was opened May 11, 1904, five years after local novelist Alice French lobbied Carnegie for a grant. It was condemned and demolished in 1966.
24	Denison	Denison		Mar 14, 1902	$12,500	1403 1st Ave. S. 42°00′59″N 95°21′13″W	A Cox and Schoentgen design which opened on August 10, 1904, this building was extensively renovated in 1985; the original rooms are used only as meeting rooms today.
25	DeWitt	DeWitt		Apr 8, 1907	$7,116	510 9th St. 41°49′29″N 90°32′15″W	This building was converted to City Hall in the late 1980s when a new library was built for DeWitt. C.R. Spink of Davenport was the architect; Large Brothers of DeWitt was the builder.
26	Dubuque	Dubuque		Jan 12, 1901	$71,500	360 W. 11th St. 42°30′10″N 90°40′13″W	Opened October 20, 1902, this Spencer and Williamson design is the largest Carnegie building in Iowa still in use as a library.
27	Dunlap	Dunlap		May 2, 1911	$10,000	116 Iowa Ave. 41°51′18″N 95°36′11″W	This building was designed by Barber and Glenn of nearby Denison. It is now a church.
28	Eagle Grove	Eagle Grove		Apr 26, 1902	$10,000	401 W. Broadway St. 42°39′53″N 93°54′21″W	Opened on September 15, 1903, this Smith and Gage design was a library until 1976. It is now the Eagle Grove Historical Museum.
29	Eldon	Eldon		Mar 18, 1911	$7,500	608 W. Elm St. 40°55′12″N 92°13′28″W	This Wetherall and Gage building was opened on May 9, 1913.
30	Eldora	Eldora		Dec 30, 1901	$10,000	1219 14th Ave. 42°21′37″N 93°05′55″W	Opened May 11, 1903, this Patton and Miller work is unusually asymmetrical. It is now a private business.
31	Emmetsburg	Emmetsburg		Feb 20, 1911	$10,000	2008 10th St.43°06′47″N 94°40′26″W	The work of architect A. T. Simmons, this building was dedicated December 13, 1912 and now houses the Iowa State University Extension Service.
32	Estherville	Estherville		Feb 15, 1902	$10,000	613 Central Ave. 43°24′09″N 94°50′11″W	This building was greatly expanded in 1992.
33	Fairfield	Fairfield		Jan 15, 1892	$30,000	112 S. Court St. 41°00′21″N 91°57′45″W	The fifth Carnegie library in the United States to be commissioned and the first outside of Western Pennsylvania. Fairfield's grant effort was spurred by Senator James F. Wilson. The Richardsonian Romanesque work is now operated by Indian Hills Community College as a satellite campus building, as a new library was built in 1996.
34	Fort Dodge	Fort Dodge		Jan 10, 1901	$30,000	605 1st Ave. N. 42°30′24″N 94°11′25″W	This building was designed by Milwaukee architects H. C. Koch and Son and was dedicated October 15, 1903. It operated until November 20, 2000, when a new library opened. It is currently being renovated to become an apartment complex.
35	Garner	Garner		Jun 11, 1914	$6,500		Dedicated August 13, 1914, this building was razed in 1977 or 1978.
36	Glenwood	Glenwood		Jul 27, 1903	$7,500	109 N. Vine St. 41°02′53″N 95°44′31″W	Opening February 4, 1907, this building was greatly renovated and modernized (for that time) in the early 1980s.
37	Greenfield	Greenfield		Sep 29, 1915	$7,500	SE Kent St. and S. 1st St. 41°18′11″N 94°27′38″W	Omaha architect Lloyd Willis designed this Colonial Revival building which was dedicated November 27, 1916. The building was used as a library until 1997.
38	Grundy Center	Grundy Center		Apr 8, 1910	$6,000		Designed by Conrad architect John R. Gier and opening November 6, 1912, this building was torn down to build Grundy Center's new library.
39	Hamburg	Hamburg		Dec 3, 1915	$9,000	1301 Main St. 40°36′25.89″N 95°39′25.83″W	Designed by architects Sawyer and Watrous, this library was dedicated on June 9, 1919.
40	Hampton	Hampton		Mar 14, 1902	$10,000	4 S. Federal St. 42°44′29.76″N 93°12′25.74″W	Dedicated October 6, 1905, this building is the design of Liebbe, Nourse, and Rasmussen.
41	Hawarden	Hawarden		Oct 3, 1901	$5,000	803 10th St. 42°59′47.48″N 96°29′0.18″W	A Smith and Gage design, this building was dedicated April 30, 1903, and was renovated in 1971 and 1991.
42	Humboldt	Humboldt		Dec 13, 1906	$10,000	30 N. 6th St. 42°43′19.09″N 94°12′59.47″W	Designed by Hawlett and Rawson, this library was dedicated on February 9, 1909. An addition was built in 1992.
43	Indianola	Indianola		Jan 13, 1903	$12,000	106 W. Boston Ave. 41°21′45.47″N 93°33′43.07″W	Dedicated on May 31, 1904, this building was in use as a library until 1984. It was designed by local architects Beymer and Keith. Today it houses the offices of the Des Moines Metro Opera.
44	Iowa City	Iowa City		Mar 14, 1902	$35,000	200 S. Linn St. 41°39′31.57″N 91°31′53.1″W	Dedicated October 29, 1904, this building served Iowa City as a library until 1981, though an addition was added in 1963. It is now an apartment building.
45	Iowa Falls	Iowa Falls		Mar 20, 1903	$10,000	520 Rocksylvania Ave. 42°31′17.52″N 93°15′49.52″W	Dedicated August 9, 1904, this library has since 2000 been an art and history museum.
46	Jefferson	Jefferson		Feb 2, 1903	$10,000	200 W. Lincolnway St. 42°0′55.99″N 94°22′35.04″W	The design of Hawlett and Rawson, this library was dedicated April 19, 1904. An addition was added in 1967, and the building was renovated again in 1990.
47	Knoxville	Knoxville		Nov 30, 1910	$10,000	213 E. Montgomery St. 41°19′2.38″N 93°5′48.57″W	This building was dedicated July 2, 1913.
48	Lake City	Lake City		May 8, 1908	$7,500	120 N. Illinois St. 42°16′3.16″N 94°43′56.54″W	This design of Edgar Lee Barber opened April 23, 1909. It is now a private restaurant.
49	Laurens	Laurens		Feb 6, 1907	$3,800	263 N. 3rd St. 42°50′58.52″N 94°51′4.91″W	A Wetherell and Gage design, this building was dedicated on October 8, 1910.
50	Le Mars	Le Mars		Jan 22, 1903	$12,500	200 Central Ave. SE; 42°47′27.74″N 96°9′57.91″W	This building, designed by John Werling, was dedicated on January 1, 1904. It is now an art center.
51	Leon	Leon		Apr 20, 1905	$6,000	200 W. 1st St. 40°44′22.33″N 93°45′0.64″W	This library opened and was dedicated on November 1, 1906.
52	Logan	Logan		Dec 3, 1915	$10,000	121 E. 6th St. 41°38′39.32″N 95°47′23.96″W	This building was dedicated on December 28, 1920, and has served the community continuously since then.
53	Malvern	Malvern		Sep 29, 1915	$8,000	502 Main St. 41°0′13.75″N 95°35′5.51″W	This building was opened on June 2, 1917. This library was remodeled in 2006 by expanding the original structure with additional wings.
54	Manchester	Manchester		Apr 11, 1902	$10,000	374 N. Franklin St. 42°29′11.17″N 91°27′28.59″W	This library was opened in March 1903. An addition was completed in 1993.
55	Maquoketa	Maquoketa		Mar 14, 1902	$12,500	126 S. Second St. 42°4′11.09″N 90°40′0.7″W	Dedicated January 19, 1904, this work by architect Harry Netcott completed an expansion in 1998.
56	Marengo	Marengo		Mar 27, 1903	$10,000	235 E. Hilton St. 41°47′55.85″N 92°4′5.59″W	One of many Patton and Miller designs, this building was dedicated on August 4, 1905. A renovation and addition was completed in May 2007.
57	Marion	Marion		Jan 22, 1903	$11,500	1298 7th Ave. 42°2′0.97″N 91°35′45.6″W	Dedicated on March 6, 1905, this Dieman and Fiske design now houses offices for the United Methodist Church.
58	Marshalltown	Marshalltown		Dec 30, 1901	$30,000	36 N. Center St. 42°3′0.72″N 92°54′47.6″W	An unusual Carnegie library built on a corner, this Patton and Miller design served as a library from April 22, 1903, until December 2008.
59	Mason City	Mason City		Apr 11, 1902	$20,000	208 E. State St. 43°9′7.47″N 93°11′50.67″W	A Patton and Miller design, this library was dedicated on January 10, 1905, but by 1940 a new library was opened. It now houses private businesses.
60	Missouri Valley	Missouri Valley		Feb 1, 1909	$10,000	119 N. Fifth St. 41°33′25.97″N 95°53′20.76″W	Dedicated on January 2, 1912, this library completed an addition in 2004.
61	Montezuma	Montezuma		May 3, 1917	$8,000	200 S. 3rd St. 41°35′6.88″N 92°31′30.31″W	This library was designed by Wetherall and Gage and was dedicated April 16, 1919, and is now home to the Poweshiek County Historical & Genealogical Society.
62	Monticello	Monticello		Feb 12, 1903	$10,500	205 E. Grand St. 42°14′16.69″N 91°11′17.35″W	Dedicated on May 27, 1904, this Patton and Miller library was designated one of Iowa's seven most endangered historic properties in 2005.
63	Mount Ayr	Mount Ayr		Sep 29, 1915	$8,000	121 W. Monroe St. 40°42′49.01″N 94°14′19.07″W	This library was dedicated on January 1, 1917.
64	Mount Pleasant	Mount Pleasant		Jan 13, 1903	$12,500	200 N. Main St. 40°58′6.11″N 91°33′9.21″W	Dedicated on February 22, 1905, this building's tower reflects a Romanesque style. It is now occupied by Southeastern Community College.
65	Nashua	Nashua		Jan 19, 1905	$5,690	220 Brasher St. 42°57′11.25″N 92°32′16.31″W	Dedicated on January 10, 1906, the Nashua library completed an addition in 1986.
66	New Hampton	New Hampton		Aug 15, 1908	$10,000	7 N. Water Ave. 43°3′34.76″N 92°18′46.27″W	Dedicated on February 4, 1910, this building is now the Carnegie Cultural Center.
67	Newton	Newton		Jan 22, 1902	$10,000	400 1st Ave. W. 41°41′59.46″N 93°3′28.77″W	Designed by Hallett and Rawson, this building was opened December 22, 1902, and demolished in 1994.
68	Odebolt	Odebolt		Mar 8, 1904	$4,000	200 S. Walnut St. 42°18′44.99″N 95°15′12.23″W	Designed by George W. Burkhead of Sioux City, this library was opened on March 1, 1905. A major addition was completed in 1999.
69	Onawa	Onawa		Dec 13, 1907	$10,000	707 Iowa Ave. 42°1′38.11″N 96°5′35.39″W	An excellent example of Prairie School architecture, this building was dedicated on October 22, 1909.
70	Osage	Osage		Mar 27, 1905	$10,000	806 Main St. 43°17′4.88″N 92°48′33.41″W	This building was dedicated on August 1, 1911 and now houses offices for the City of Osage.
71	Osceola	Osceola		Dec 14, 1908	$11,000	300 S. Fillmore St. 41°1′55.19″N 93°46′3.68″W	This building was dedicated on June 15, 1911.
72	Oskaloosa	Oskaloosa		Mar 14, 1902	$22,000	301 S. Market St. 41°17′35.77″N 92°38′43.47″W	Dedicated and opened on September 8, 1903, a 1997 addition doubled the size of this library.
73	Ottumwa	Ottumwa		Feb 16, 1900	$50,000	102 W. 4th St. 41°1′11.25″N 92°24′41.13″W	Designed by Smith and Gage, this building was dedicated on September 24, 1902.
74	Pella	Pella		Nov 24, 1905	$11,000	825 Broadway St. 41°24′26.97″N 92°55′7.22″W	This building was dedicated on December 18, 1907, and served as a library until 1999. It is now Pella City Hall.
75	Perry	Perry		Jan 13, 1903	$10,600	1123 Willis Ave. 41°50′22.65″N 94°6′26.59″W	This building served as the library from its dedication on December 10, 1904, until the mid–1990s.
76	Red Oak	Red Oak		Nov 27, 1906	$12,500	400 N. Second St. 41°0′29.81″N 95°13′48.86″W	Dedicated and opened on October 8, 1909, this building is the design of Patton and Miller.
77	Reinbeck	Reinbeck		Mar 31, 1916	$6,000	501 Clark St. 42°19′26.17″N 92°35′58.51″W	Dedicated on November 7, 1917, this library constructed an addition in 1992.
78	Rockwell City	Rockwell City		Feb 10, 1908	$8,000	426 5th St. 42°23′40.81″N 94°38′5.25″W	Dedicated June 3, 1909, this building was vacated when the library moved in 2008.
79	Sac City	Sac City		Jan 6, 1911	$8,000	615 W. Main St. 42°25′21.99″N 94°59′27.56″W	Dedicated February 24, 1913, this library was in use until 1985. It is now the Sac City Chamber of Commerce.
80	Sanborn	Sanborn		Mar 29, 1911	$4,000	407 Main St. 43°11′5.76″N 95°39′20.85″W	This library was dedicated on May 22, 1912.
81	Sheldon	Sheldon		Feb 28, 1906	$10,000	321 10th St. 43°10′49.93″N 95°51′18.63″W	Built in the Beaux-Arts style, this library is now a museum.
82	Shenandoah	Shenandoah		Jan 22, 1903	$10,000	201 S. Elm St. 40°45′56.25″N 95°22′25.82″W	Dedicated August 1, 1905, this library has been twice expanded with additional wings. The latest expansion remodel was in 2012.
83	Sibley	Sibley		Sep 29, 1915	$10,000	406 9th St. 43°24′6.5″N 95°44′55.72″W	Dedicated December 11, 1917, this library was expanded in 1985.
84	Sigourney	Sigourney		Jan 2, 1913	$10,000	203 N. Jefferson St. 41°20′9.03″N 92°12′15.38″W	This library, dedicated on May 18, 1914, served the community until 2005. It is now home to a private firm.
85	Sioux City Main	Sioux City		Apr 8, 1911	$75,000	6th St. and Jackson St. 42°29′47.03″N 96°24′7.23″W	Opened and dedicated on March 6, 1913, this library was converted into the Carnegie Place Apartments.
86	Sioux City Leeds Branch	Sioux City		Apr 8, 1911	$10,000	3901 Floyd Blvd. 42°32′24.42″N 96°21′39.67″W	This building is now an American Legion hall.
87	Spencer	Spencer		Jan 13, 1903	$10,000		This library was dedicated on March 6, 1905, and was razed in 1970. Spencer's new library was home to Dewey Readmore Books.
88	Spirit Lake	Spirit Lake		Feb 1, 1905	$8,000	1801 Hill Ave. 43°25′20″N 95°6′5″W	This library was dedicated on September 24, 1912, and is now a private business.
89	Storm Lake	Storm Lake		Dec 4, 1903	$10,000	200 E. 5th St. 42°38′42.09″N 95°11′58.64″W	Designed by Paul O. Moratz and dedicated on September 29, 1906, this building is now the Buena Vista County Historical Museum.
90	Stuart	Stuart		Nov 14, 1906	$6,500	111 NE Front St. 41°30′13.81″N 94°19′4.46″W	This building was dedicated on April 3, 1908.
91	Tama	Tama		Aug 30, 1904	$8,500	901 McClellan St. 41°58′3.245″N 92°34′41.393″W	Dedicated on February 1, 1907, this library served Tama until 2000 when a new library was built.
92	Tipton	Tipton		Jul 9, 1902	$10,000	206 Cedar St. 41°46′2.66″N 91°7′39.56″W	Dedicated August 16, 1904, this library was expanded in 1988.
93	Traer	Traer		Jun 11, 1914	$10,000	531 Second St. 42°11′35.39″N 92°27′59.07″W	This library was dedicated on March 31, 1916, and underwent a renovation and addition in 2004.
94	Villisca	Villisca		May 2, 1907	$10,000	204 S. 3rd Ave. 40°55′56.41″N 94°58′37.82″W	This building was dedicated and opened on February 5, 1909.
95	Vinton	Vinton		Jan 2, 1903	$12,500	510 Second Ave. 42°9′59.05″N 92°1′21.13″W	Dedicated on August 25, 1904, this library was later expanded.
96	Waterloo East Side	Waterloo		Apr 11, 1902	$24,000	715 Mulberry St. 42°29′56.28″N 92°19′55.99″W	This library is the work of J.G. Ralston and was dedicated on February 23, 1906. Unusually, Waterloo was granted one library but requested funding for two after a disagreement on where to place the library resulted in additional funding from Carnegie. It now houses city offices.
97	Waterloo West Side	Waterloo		Apr 11, 1902	$21,000	528 W. 4th St. 42°29′32.28″N 92°20′36.85″W	This library is the work of J.G. Ralston and was dedicated on February 23, 1906. It was the second library proposed for Waterloo and now houses offices for private attorneys.
98	Waverly	Waverly		Feb 20, 1903	$10,000	100 2nd Street SW	This library was dedicated on January 1, 1905, and now houses city offices.
99	West Liberty	West Liberty		Feb 5, 1904	$7,500	400 N. Spencer St. 41°34′17.07″N 91°15′41.79″W	This building was dedicated on January 12, 1905.
100	Winterset	Winterset		Feb 5, 1904	$10,000	124 W. Court Ave. 41°20′3.26″N 94°0′56″W	This building, dedicated on June 16, 1905, is now City Hall.
101	Woodbine	Woodbine		Apr 28, 1909	$7,500	58 Fifth St. 41°44′13.36″N 95°42′20.55″W	Dedicated on March 9, 1910, this library was expanded in 2001.

== Academic libraries ==
	Institution	City or town	Image	Date granted	Grant amount	Location	Remarks
1	Cornell College	Mount Vernon	Library 1908	Dec 21, 1903	$50,000	Cornell College campus 41°55′30″N 91°25′18″W	Unusually, this library was granted with the intent to serve as both a community and collegiate library, a role which remains to this day (though the agreement was informal until 2001). This building was used until 1957, and it is now the Norton Geology Center and Anderson Museum.
2	Drake University	Des Moines		Mar 27, 1905	$50,000	2621 Carpenter Avenue (Oppermann Hall); 41°36′08″N 93°39′10″W	A Proudfoot and Bird design, this building was converted to house the Drake Law Library in 1938. When a new Law Library was built in 1990, Carnegie Hall was converted to classroom use.
3	Ellsworth College	Iowa Falls		Mar 12, 1906	$10,000		
4	Grinnell College	Grinnell		Mar 7, 1903	$50,000	1210 Park St. 41°44′54″N 92°43′21″W	This H.D. Rawson design opened June 13, 1905, and served the college until 1959, when a new library was built. It is now Carnegie Hall.
5	Parsons College	Fairfield		Mar 31, 1905	$15,000	Parsons College campus 41°00′58″N 91°58′00″W	Parsons College lost its accreditation and closed in 1973. This structure was razed in July 2000 by the Maharishi University of Management, which purchased the buildings and bulldozed many of them for new structures conforming to Maharishi Sthapatya Veda. It remains a contributing property to a historic district.
6	Simpson College	Indianola		Feb 16, 1905	$10,000	508 N. C St. 41°21′52″N 93°33′52″W	In 1964, no longer library with construction of Dunn Library. Housed business and art classes. Renamed Heckert Hall in 1975. Business moved out and renamed Art Center. Razed in 2014.
7	Upper Iowa University	Fayette		Jan 1, 1901	$25,000	605 Washington St. 42°50′18″N 91°48′03″W	The first academic library granted in Iowa, it was named after former student David B. Henderson, Speaker of the House and a personal friend of Carnegie's.

== See also ==
- List of libraries in the United States
