= J.E. Squiers House =

Historic house in Iowa, United States

- U.S. National Register of Historic Places
- U.S. Historic district – Contributing property
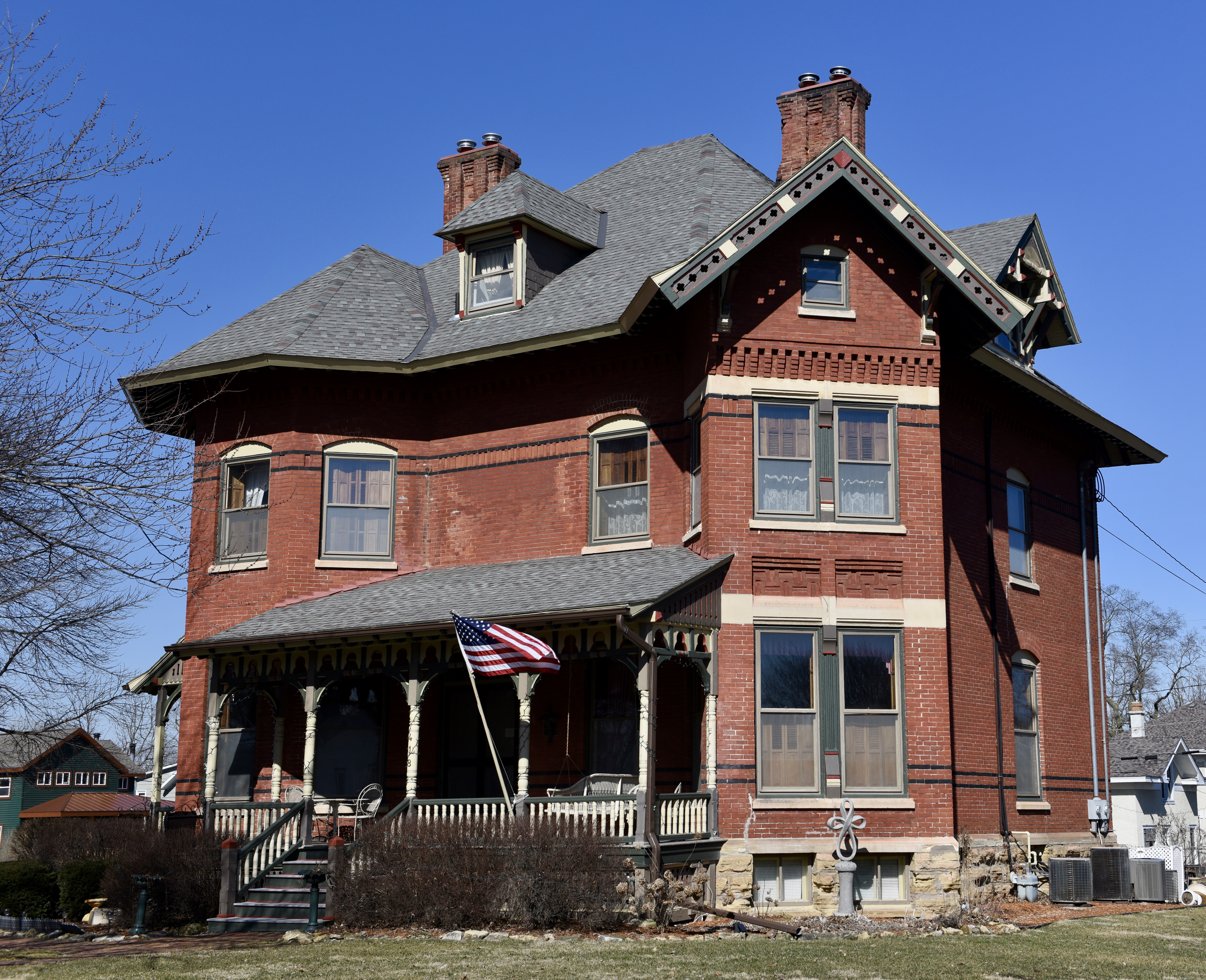

- Location within Iowa Location within the United States
- Location: 418 W. Pleasant St. Maquoketa, Iowa
- Coordinates: 42°04′05″N 90°40′16″W
- Area: less than one acre
- Built: 1882
- Architectural style: Queen Anne; Stick/Eastlake
- Part of: West Pleasant Street Historic District (ID91000970)
- MPS: Maquoketa MPS
- NRHP reference No.: 95000385
- Added to NRHP: April 20, 1995

The J.E. Squiers House, also known as the Squiers Manor Bed and Breakfast, is a historic building located in Maquoketa, Iowa, United States. The architectural and historic significance of this house is attributed to its being "a well-preserved example of late nineteenth century domestic architecture in Maquoketa's most prominent residential neighborhood and for its association with the life and career of James Emery Squiers, a prominent local businessman." Built in 1882, the 2 1/2-story brick house features elements consistent with the Queen Anne and Stick styles. It follows a central hall floor plan with two rectangular projecting bays, a three-sided bay window, a kitchen addition on the back, and a hipped roof with intersecting gable sections.

Squiers ran a dry goods business downtown, which he sold in 1885. He was elected president of the First National Bank of Maquoketa, a position he held until two months before his death in 1911. There was no mortgage to pay for the construction of this house, which attests to the Squiers' wealth. The house was included as a contributing property in the West Pleasant Street Historic District in 1991, and it was individually listed on the National Register of Historic Places in 1995.
