= Hamburg Public Library =

Hamburg Public Library may refer to:

- Hamburg Public Library (Hamburg, Iowa), listed on the National Register of Historic Places in Iowa
- Hamburg Public Library (Hamburg, Pennsylvania), listed on the National Register of Historic Places in Berks County, Pennsylvania
