= Weldon Brothers =

Weldon Brothers may refer to

- Weldon Brothers Construction Company, bridge construction company of Iowa, known as Weldon Brothers
- George and Thomas Weldon, architects of Mississippi, also known as Weldon Brothers
