= Washington Avenue Bridge (Iowa Falls, Iowa) =

- U.S. National Register of Historic Places
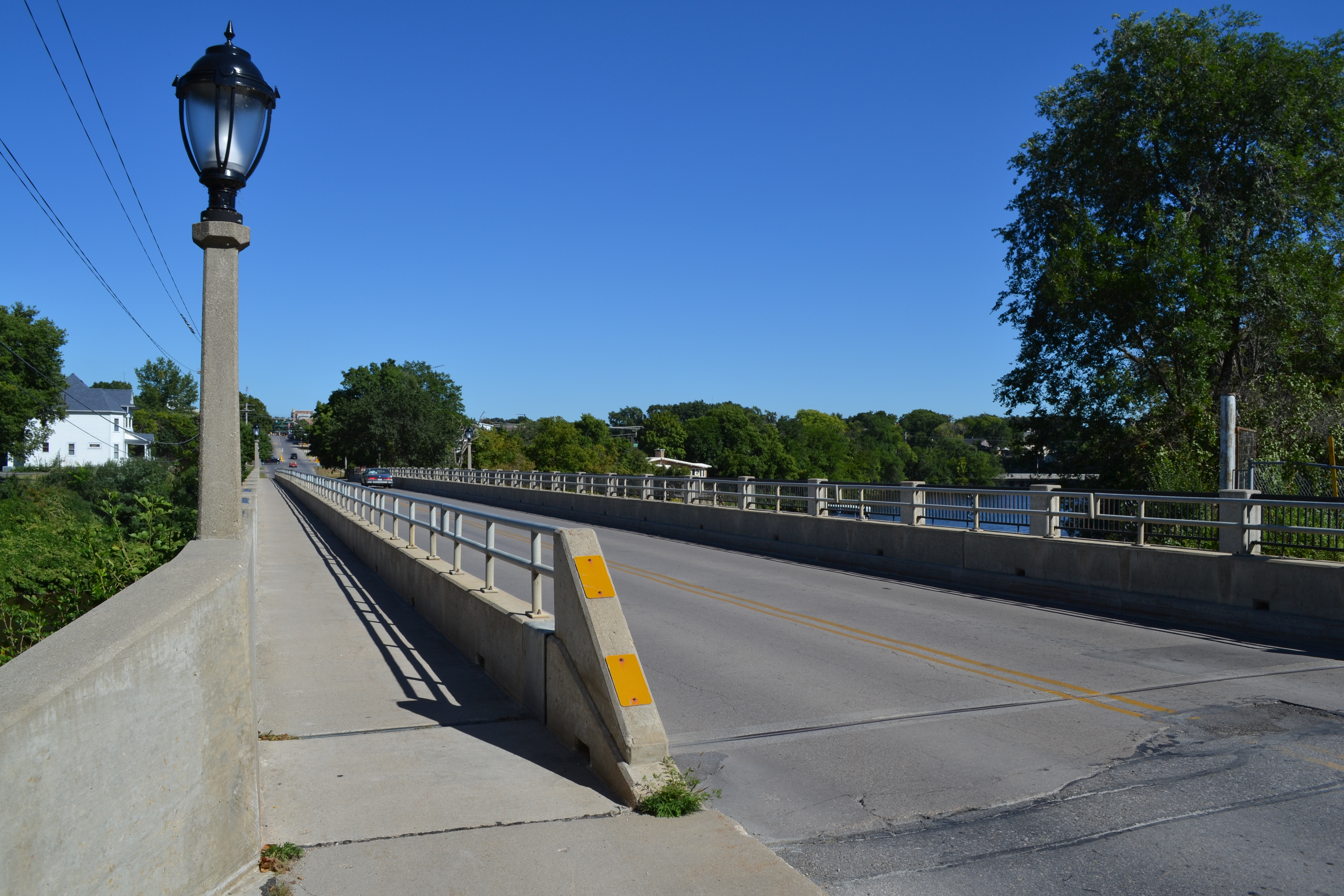

- Location within Iowa Location within the United States
- Location: Washington Avenue over the Iowa River, Iowa Falls, Iowa
- Coordinates: 42°31′11″N 93°16′16″W
- Area: less than one acre
- Built: 1934
- Built by: Iowa State Highway Commission; Weldon Brothers
- Architectural style: Open spandrel arch
- MPS: Highway Bridges of Iowa MPS
- NRHP reference No.: 98000518
- Added to NRHP: May 15, 1998

The Washington Avenue Bridge in Iowa Falls, Iowa, is a concrete two-span open-spandrel arch bridge that carries Washington Avenue over the Iowa River. Originally, it served as part of U.S. Route 20. The bridge was built in 1934 by the Weldon Brothers at a cost of $51,710.55.

In the 1920s and 1930s, if a relatively long bridge was needed in a rural area, it would typically have been constructed using steel trusses. However, in urban settings—where sufficient height allowed for wide arches—a concrete open-spandrel arch bridge could be built, offering both structural efficiency and visual appeal. In Iowa, other examples of this bridge type include the Mederville Bridge (1918), the Adair Viaduct (1923), and the Iowa Falls Bridge (1928, also built by the Weldon Brothers). The Washington Avenue bridge is especially notable as a well-preserved two-span example.

It was listed on the National Register of Historic Places in 1998.

== See also ==
- List of bridges on the National Register of Historic Places in Iowa
- National Register of Historic Places listings in Hardin County, Iowa
