= Alden Bridge =

- U.S. National Register of Historic Places
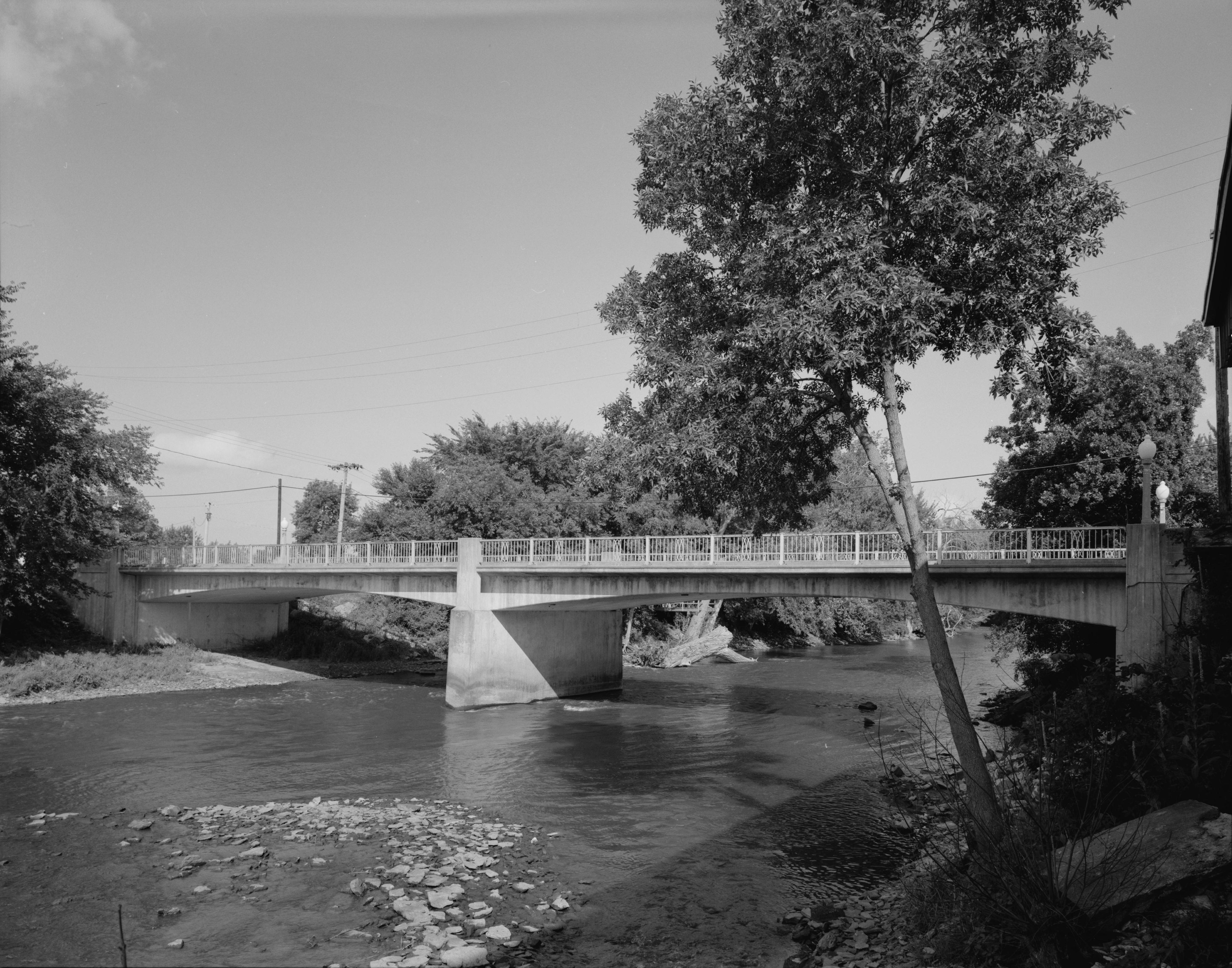

- Location within Iowa Location within the United States
- Location: Main Street over Iowa River; Alden, Iowa
- Coordinates: 42°31′16″N 93°22′32″W
- Area: less than one acre
- Built: 1936
- Built by: Iowa State Highway Commission; Weldon Brothers
- Architectural style: Concrete rigid frame
- MPS: Highway Bridges of Iowa MPS
- NRHP reference No.: 98000517
- Added to NRHP: May 15, 1998

The Alden Bridge is a historic bridge in Alden, Iowa, which carries the town's Main Street over the Iowa River, United States. The concrete bridge is 150 feet (46 m) long and consists of two spans. It was built in 1936 to replace an earlier wooden bridge that had begun to deteriorate. The Weldon Brothers Construction Company supervised the bridge's construction, while the Iowa State Highway Commission designed the structure; it was one of the first bridges designed by the ISHC, which used similar plans for many other bridges in the state. Labor for the construction effort came from the Works Progress Administration, providing jobs for many of Hardin County's unemployed residents. The bridge was dedicated on July 4, 1936, as part of Alden's Independence Day celebrations.

The Alden Bridge was listed on the National Register of Historic Places on May 15, 1998.

== See also ==
- List of bridges documented by the Historic American Engineering Record in Iowa
