= Woodbine Savings Bank =

- U.S. National Register of Historic Places
- U.S. Historic district – Contributing property
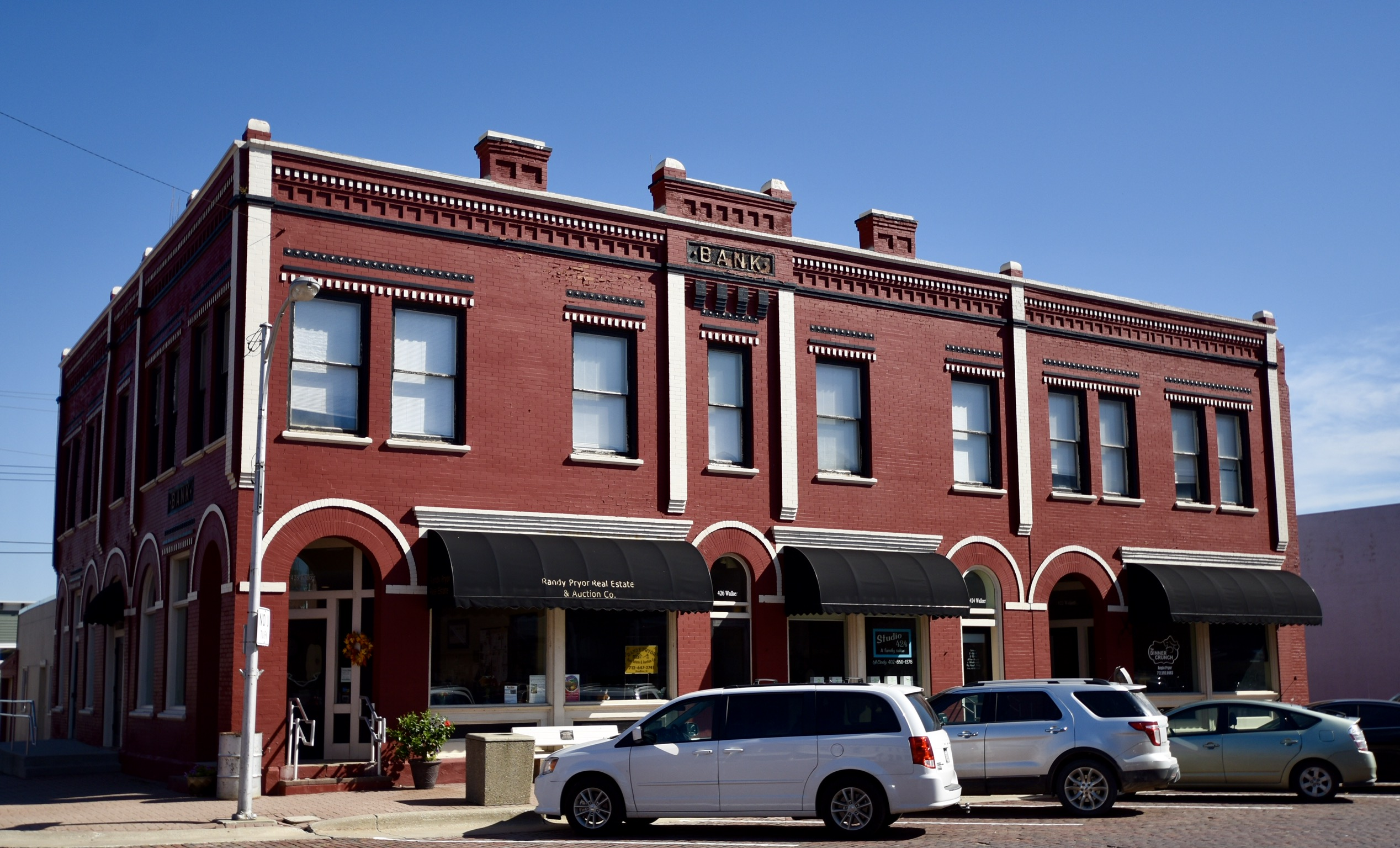

- Location within Iowa Location within the United States
- Location: 424 Walker St. Woodbine, Iowa
- Coordinates: 41°44′12.6″N 95°42′06.3″W
- Area: less than one acre
- Built: 1891
- Architectural style: Romanesque
- Part of: Woodbine Lincoln Highway and Brick Street Historic District (ID12001083)
- NRHP reference No.: 12000167
- Added to NRHP: March 27, 2012

Woodbine Savings Bank, also known as the Columbia Hotel, Haight Real Estate and Insurance, and Swain Realty, is located in Woodbine, Iowa, United States.

== History ==
The significance of this building has less to do with banking specifically, and commerce in general. After the building was constructed it housed both the bank and the hotel. The bank occupied the northwest corner of the building and it remained here for forty years. The hotel occupied the southern portion of the building and then it expanded to the east with a new addition not long after its initial construction. A millinery shop occupied its former first-floor location. The building was the largest in town until 1966. The hotel remained for only eight years, and it was one of two hotels in town in those years. Other significant businesses that occupied the building include Boyer Valley Telephone Company, which expanded from one line out of town to multiple lines during its short tenancy here. Other businesses include the town newspaper, the Woodbine Twiner, the Harrison County Rural Electric Cooperative had their first offices here, and Haight Real Estate and Insurance Company, which occupied the bank's former location for another 40 years.

The two-story brick structure follows the Romanesque Revival style. It features two uneven bays separated by an entrance to the second floor. The entries on the first-floor are capped with round arches. The second-floor has pilasters, and a corbel table at the parapet. The entrance to the second floor is highlighted by a raised parapet, giving the allusion of a tower. The building was individually listed on the National Register of Historic Places in 2012. The following year it was included as a contributing property in the Woodbine Lincoln Highway and Brick Street Historic District.
