= West Pleasant Street Historic District =

Historic district in Iowa, United States

- U.S. National Register of Historic Places
- U.S. Historic district
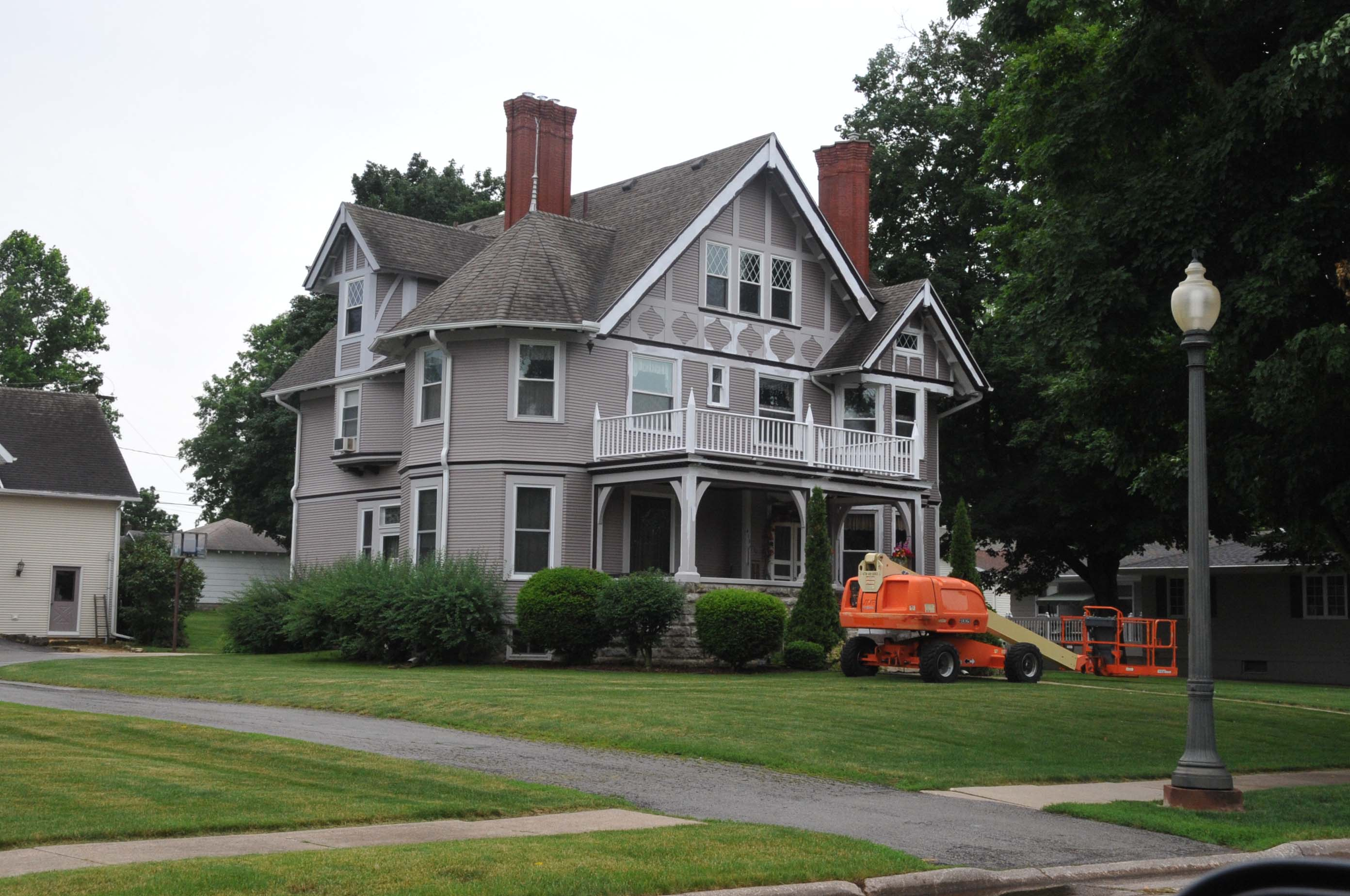
- The Dr. D.N. Loose House (1894)

- Location within Iowa Location within the United States
- Location: Pleasant St. between 2nd and Prospect Sts., Maquoketa, Iowa
- Coordinates: 42°04′04″N 90°40′10″W
- Area: 12.06 acres (4.88 ha)
- Architectural style: Late 19th and 20th century Revivals; Bungalow/Craftsman; Late Victorian
- MPS: Maquoketa MPS
- NRHP reference No.: 91000970
- Added to NRHP: August 9, 1991

The West Pleasant Street Historic District is a nationally recognized historic district located in Maquoketa, Iowa, United States. It was listed on the National Register of Historic Places in 1991. At the time of its nomination, it contained 50 resources, which included 29 contributing buildings, 21 non-contributing buildings, and one non-contributing site. The historic district is primarily a residential area that was built during Maquoketa's "Boom Years" (1873-1899) and the "Comfortable Years" (1900-1922). The first house in the district was built in 1863 and the last in 1914. This is where many of the city's business and professional leaders choose to build their houses. Most of the 28 houses were likely not designed by an architect, but, were crafted in the "High Style" of the time by local builders. With the exception of Greek Revival, all the major styles of the period built in Maquoketa are found here. Eight of the houses and one of the three remaining carriage houses are brick structures; the rest are wood.

The Maquoketa Public Library at the east entrance of the district is only non-residential contributing building. The J.E. Squiers House at the west entrance of the district is individually listed on the National Register, as is the library. The non-contributing site is a surface parking lot.
