= River Street Bridge (Iowa Falls, Iowa) =

- U.S. National Register of Historic Places
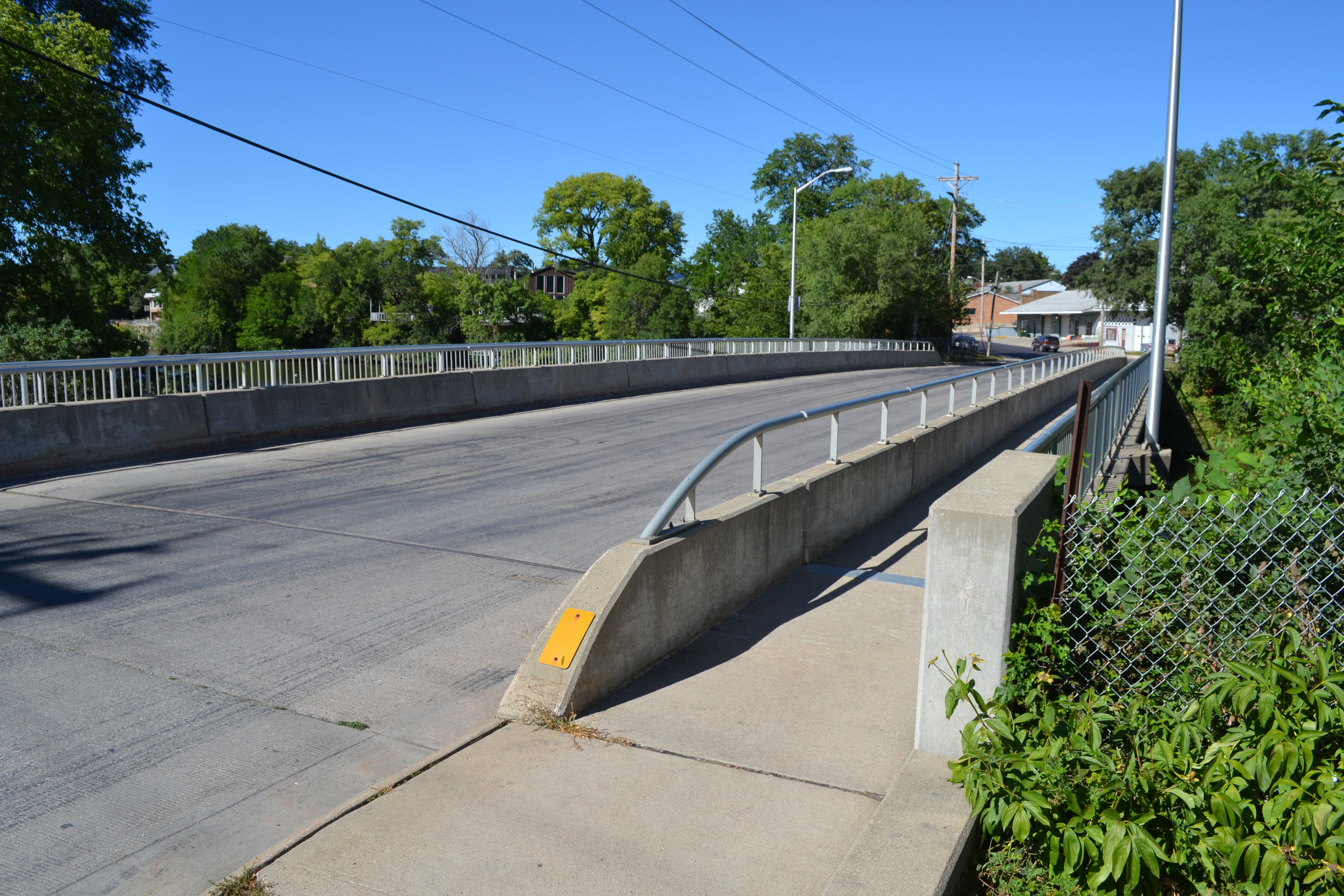
- Bridge deck in 2013

- Location within Iowa Location within the United States
- Location: River St. over the Iowa River, Iowa Falls, Iowa
- Coordinates: 42.51767°N 93.2683°W
- Area: less than one acre
- Built: 1922–1924
- Built by: Weldon Brothers
- Architect: Marsh Engineering Company
- Architectural style: Open spandrel arch
- MPS: Highway Bridges of Iowa MPS
- NRHP reference No.: 98000526
- Added to NRHP: May 15, 1998

The River Street Bridge over the Iowa River at Iowa Falls, Iowa is an open spandrel bridge built during 1922–1924. It was built by the Weldon Brothers at cost of $16,900, including removal of the previous bridge on the site. It is the fourth bridge constructed on the site, a "pivotal" location in Iowa Falls' development. It has a long span, 140 feet (43 m), and is built with three side-by-side arched ribs supporting concrete pillars.

The bridge was modified in 1958 by widening of its deck and replacement of its guardrails. It was listed on the National Register of Historic Places in 1998.

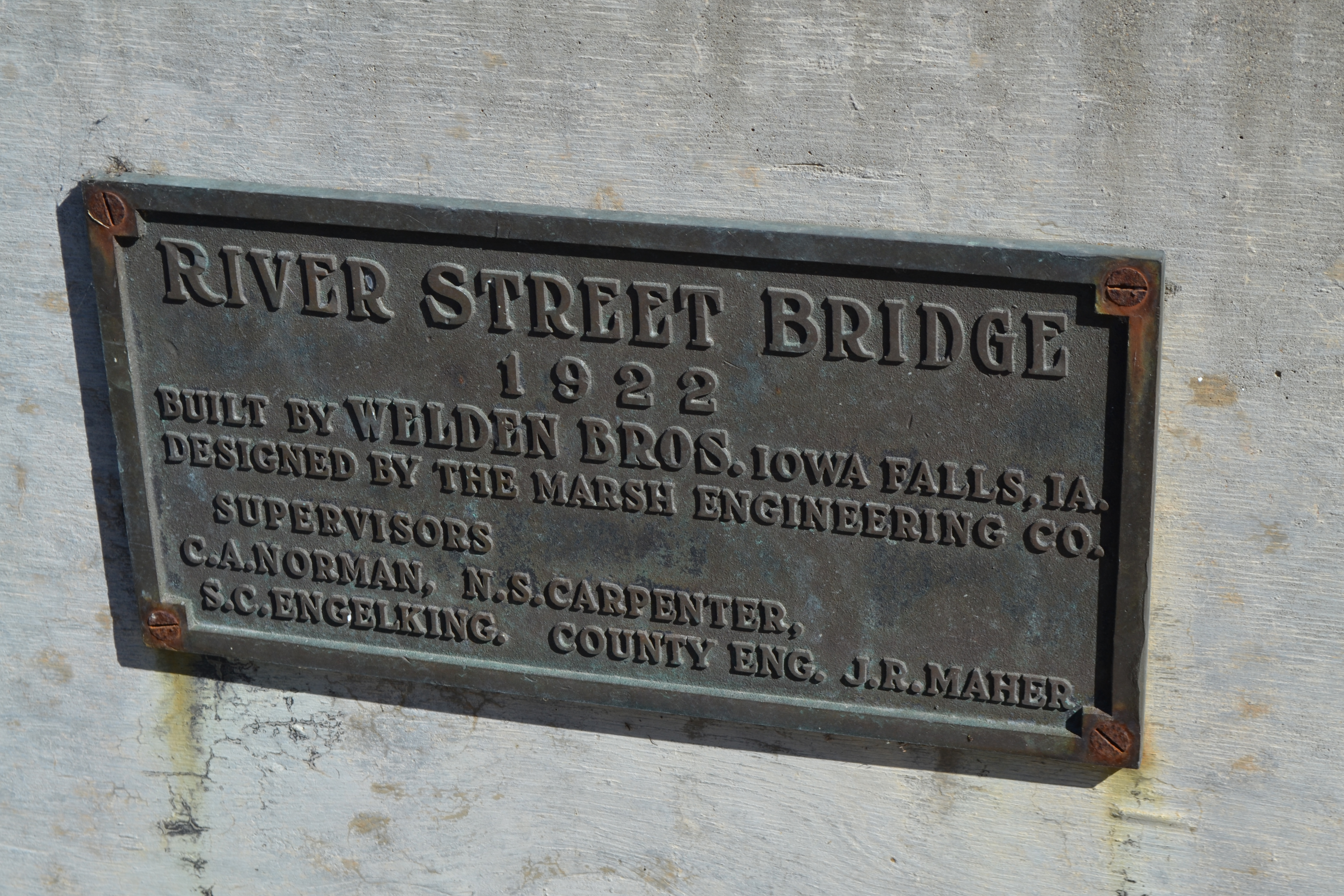
A plaque on the bridge
