= Weldon Brothers Construction Company =

American bridge construction company

The Welden Brothers, also known as Welden Brothers Construction Company, was a firm based in Iowa Falls, Iowa that built bridges throughout the midwest.

The 255-foot-long (78 m) Iowa Falls Bridge, built by the firm in 1928, was then the longest arch span in the state of Iowa.

A number of the firm's works are listed on the National Register of Historic Places (NRHP).

Works include (with attribution):

- Alden Bridge, Main St. over Iowa R. Alden, IA (Welden Brothers), NRHP-listed
- Iowa Falls Bridge, US 65 over Iowa R. Iowa Falls, IA (Welden Brothers Construction Co.), NRHP-listed
- River Street Bridge, River St. over Iowa R. Iowa Falls, IA (Welden Brothers), NRHP-listed
- Washington Avenue Bridge, US 20 over Iowa R. Iowa Falls, IA (Welden Brothers), NRHP-listed
