= Siebels' Department Store-Boyer Valley Bank =

- Siebels' Department Store- Boyer Valley Bank
- U.S. National Register of Historic Places
- U.S. Historic district – Contributing property
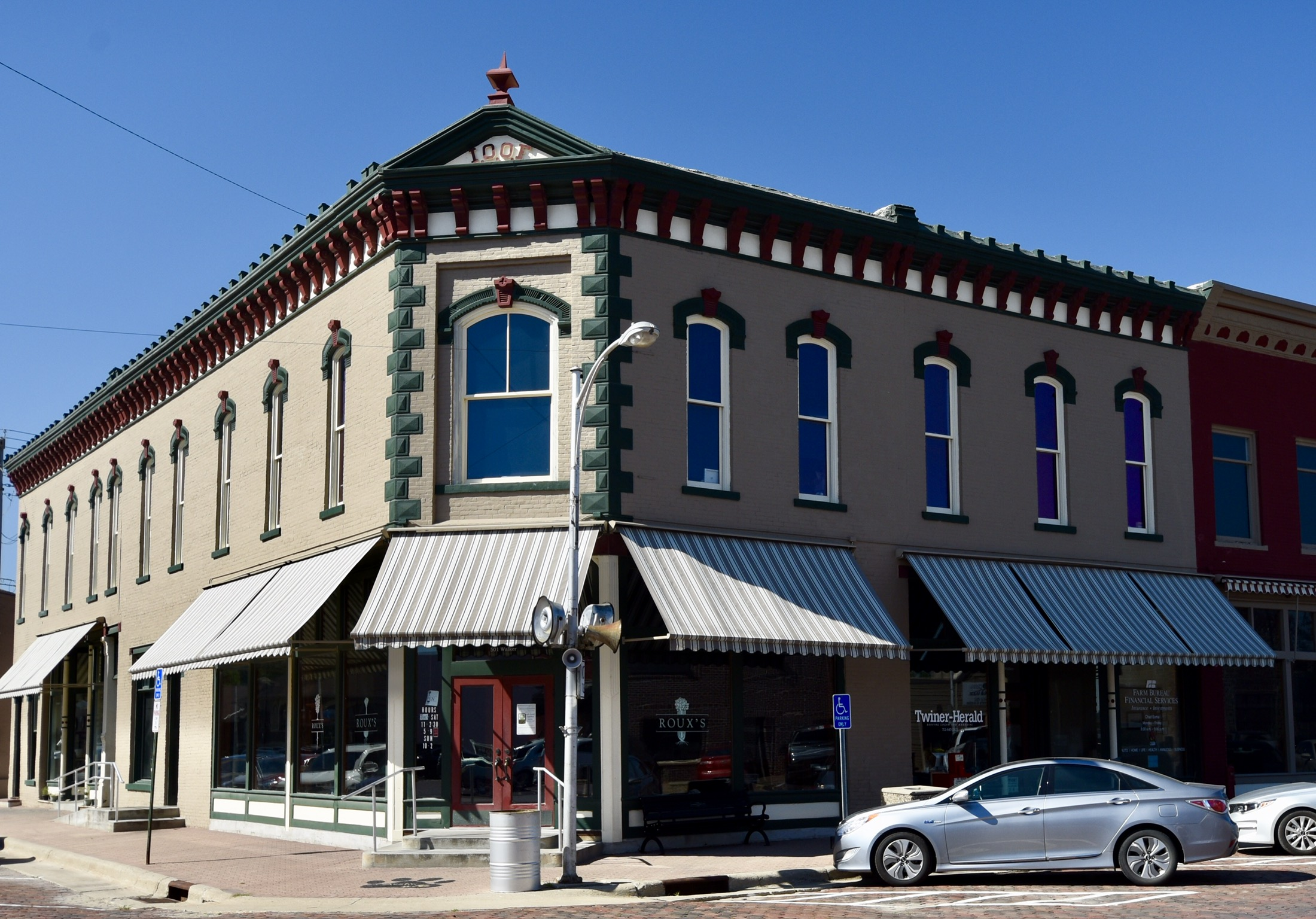

- Location within Iowa Location within the United States
- Location: 501-505 Walker St. Woodbine, Iowa
- Coordinates: 41°44′14″N 95°42′08.5″W
- Area: less than one acre
- Built: 1878, 1902, 1907
- Architectural style: Italianate
- Part of: Woodbine Lincoln Highway and Brick Street Historic District (ID12001083)
- NRHP reference No.: 12000327
- Added to NRHP: June 6, 2012

Siebels' Department Store-Boyer Valley Bank, also known as I.0.0.F. Hall, Nicely Building, Whitmore's, and the Rena Barry Building, is a historic building located in Woodbine, Iowa, United States. Siebels' was one of the largest, longest-lasting and most well-known stores in Woodbine. Adolph Siebels moved here from Minden, Iowa in 1904 and bought a grocery store. He expanded the store's offerings to include clothing, housewares and other items. Siebels expanded the store in 1907 and again in 1908. He sold shares in the store to some of his employees in the 1920s, and the store remained in business under three owners until 1954.

The store originally operated out of the corner building that was owned by the Independent Order of Odd Fellows, which had their clubhouse on the second floor. The front corner of the building was built in 1878 by the Boyer Valley Bank. It features a clipped corner with a metal cornice across the top. In 1902 an L-shaped addition was built to the west and north of the building. Siebels built the addition to the north in 1907, and its architecture was integrated into the original building. The 1908 addition to the north of the 1907 addition is slightly different, and is not part of the historic designation. The store only occupied it for three years, while it occupied the other buildings until 1954. The building was listed on the National Register of Historic Places in 2012. In 2013 it was included as a contributing property in the Woodbine Lincoln Highway and Brick Street Historic District.
