= Woodbine Lincoln Highway and Brick Street Historic District =

Historic district in Iowa, United States

- U.S. National Register of Historic Places
- U.S. Historic district
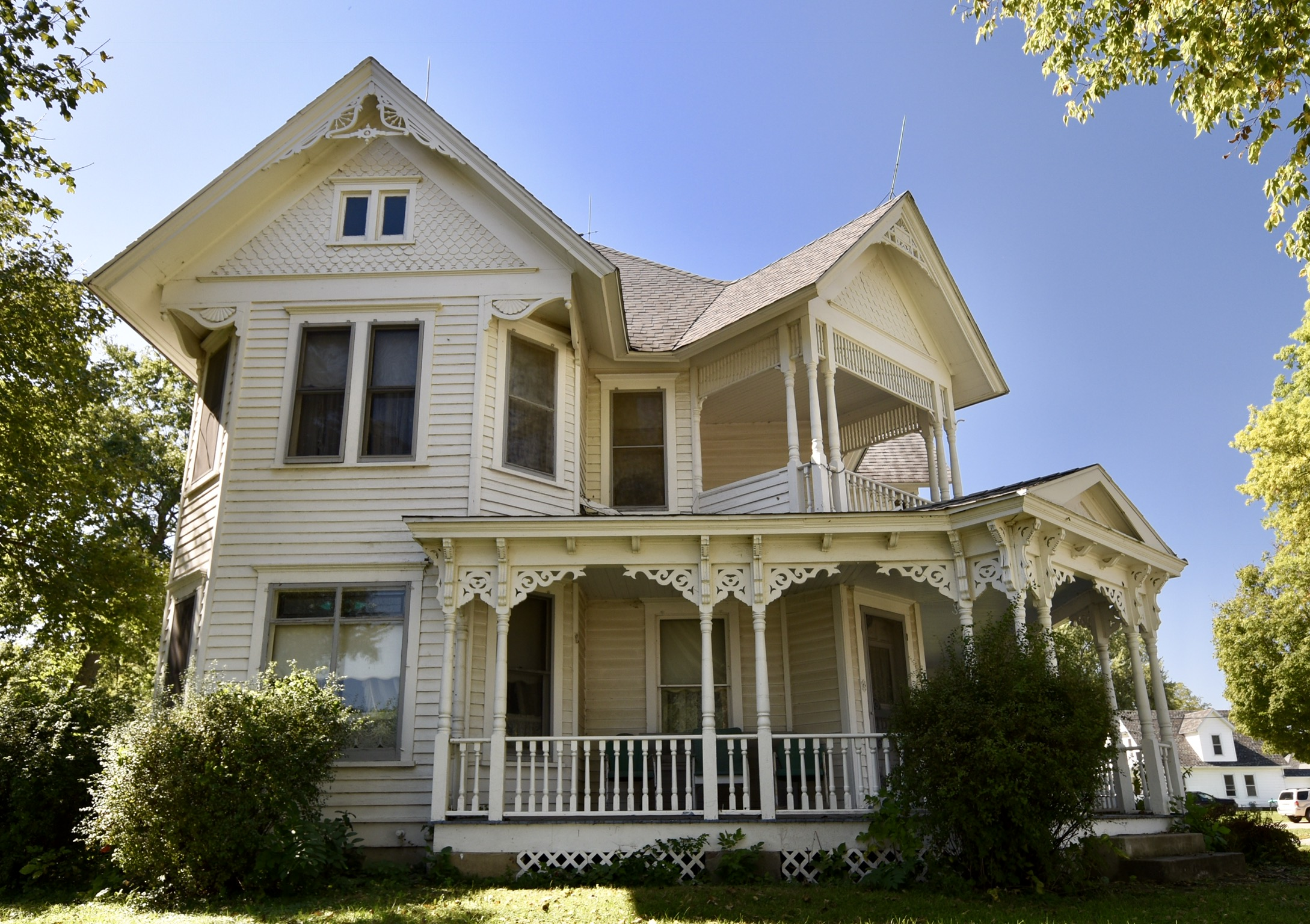

- Location within Iowa Location within the United States
- Location: 101–524 Lincoln Way, 303–524 Walker, parts of 5th, 4th, & 3rd Sts., Woodbine, Iowa
- Coordinates: 41°44′10.5″N 95°42′11.4″W
- NRHP reference No.: 12001083
- Added to NRHP: January 29, 2013

The Woodbine Lincoln Highway and Brick Street Historic District is a nationally recognized historic district located in Woodbine, Iowa, United States. It was listed on the National Register of Historic Places in 2013. The route of the Lincoln Highway through Iowa was announced on September 14, 1913. They chose what was known as the "Iowa Official Trans-Continental Route," which was already being used by transcontinental motorists through the state. It covered 358 miles (576 km) of dirt and gravel roads that began in Clinton and traveled west to Council Bluffs. The eleven block section through Woodbine follows what is now called Lincoln Way, the town's main thoroughfare. This section of the Lincoln Highway was paved with bricks in 1921. The street features a canopy of shade trees lined with houses from the turn of the 20th century. Siebels' Department Store-Boyer Valley Bank, Woodbine Savings Bank, and the Woodbine Public Library are contributing properties in the historic district.
