= Maquoketa Public Library =

- Maquoketa Free Public Library
- U.S. National Register of Historic Places
- U.S. Historic district – Contributing property
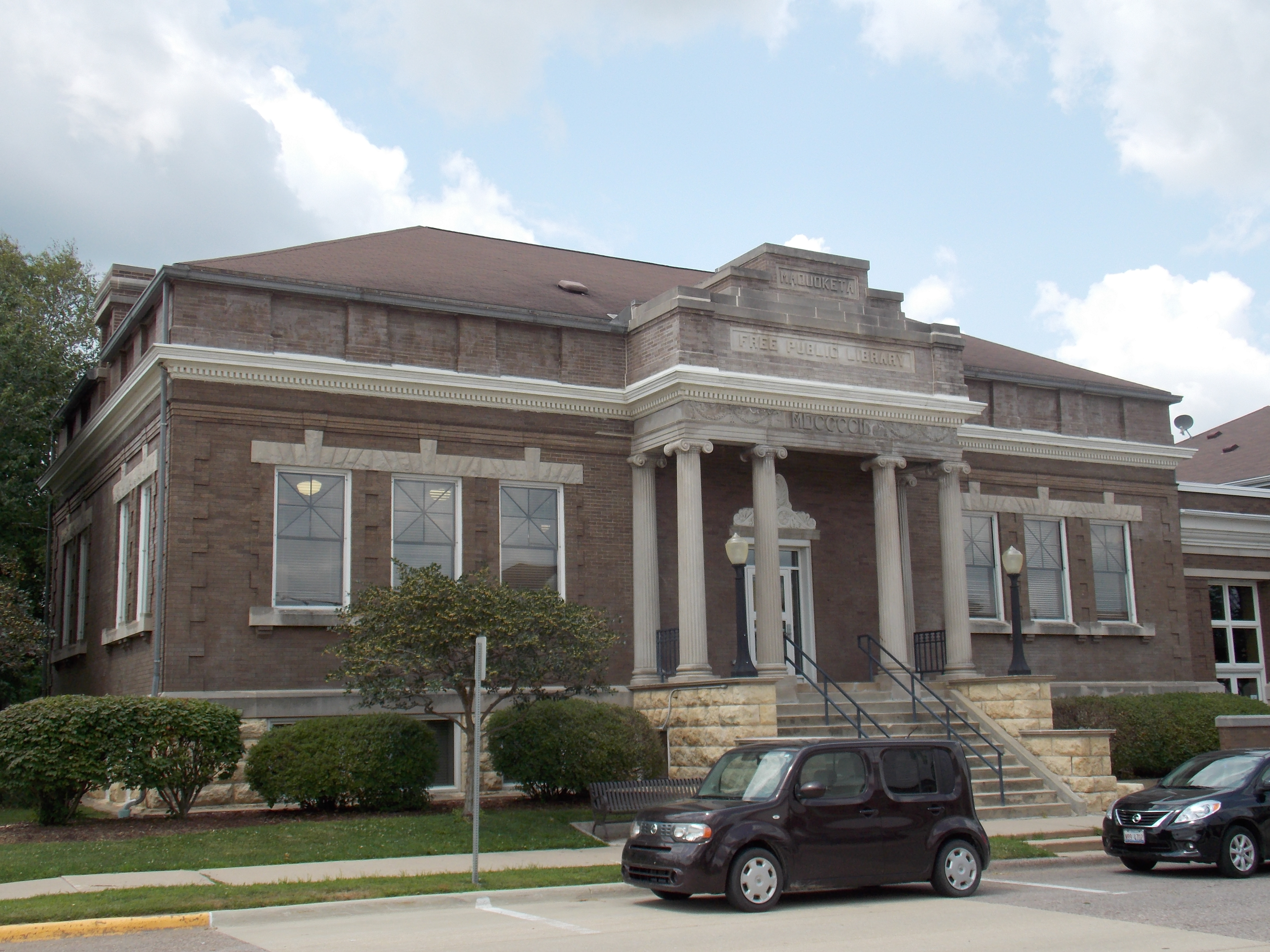

- Location within Iowa Location within the United States
- Location: 2nd and Pleasant; Maquoketa, Iowa
- Coordinates: 42°04′05″N 90°40′02″W
- Area: less than one acre
- Built: 1903-1904
- Built by: Harry Netcott
- Architectural style: Classical Revival
- Part of: West Pleasant Street Historic District (ID91000970)
- MPS: Maquoketa MPS
- NRHP reference No.: 89002102
- Added to NRHP: December 27, 1989

The Maquoketa Public Library is located in Maquoketa, Iowa, United States. The Maquoketa Literary Society was organized as early as 1851, and the Boardman Library Institute was founded in 1885. The community applied to the Carnegie Corporation of New York for a grant to build a free public library, and on March 14, 1902, they were awarded $12,500. The total cost of acquiring the property and constructing the building was $15,000, which they raised by public contributions and entertainments. Independence, Iowa architect Harry Netcott designed the Neoclassical building. It is a single-story brick structure that rests on a raised limestone basement. Bedford stone was used for the trim. It features a symmetrical facade, with columns in the Ionic order that frame the portico. The interior features a columned rotunda. It was dedicated on January 19, 1904. The Boardman Library Institute merged with the Free Public Library after the new building was completed. The roofline was altered slightly when a new roof was added around the middle of the 20th century.

The building was individually listed on the National Register of Historic Places in 1989, and it was included as a contributing property in the West Pleasant Street Historic District in 1991. An addition was built onto the north side of the building in 1998.
