= First National Bank (Maquoketa, Iowa) =

- U.S. National Register of Historic Places
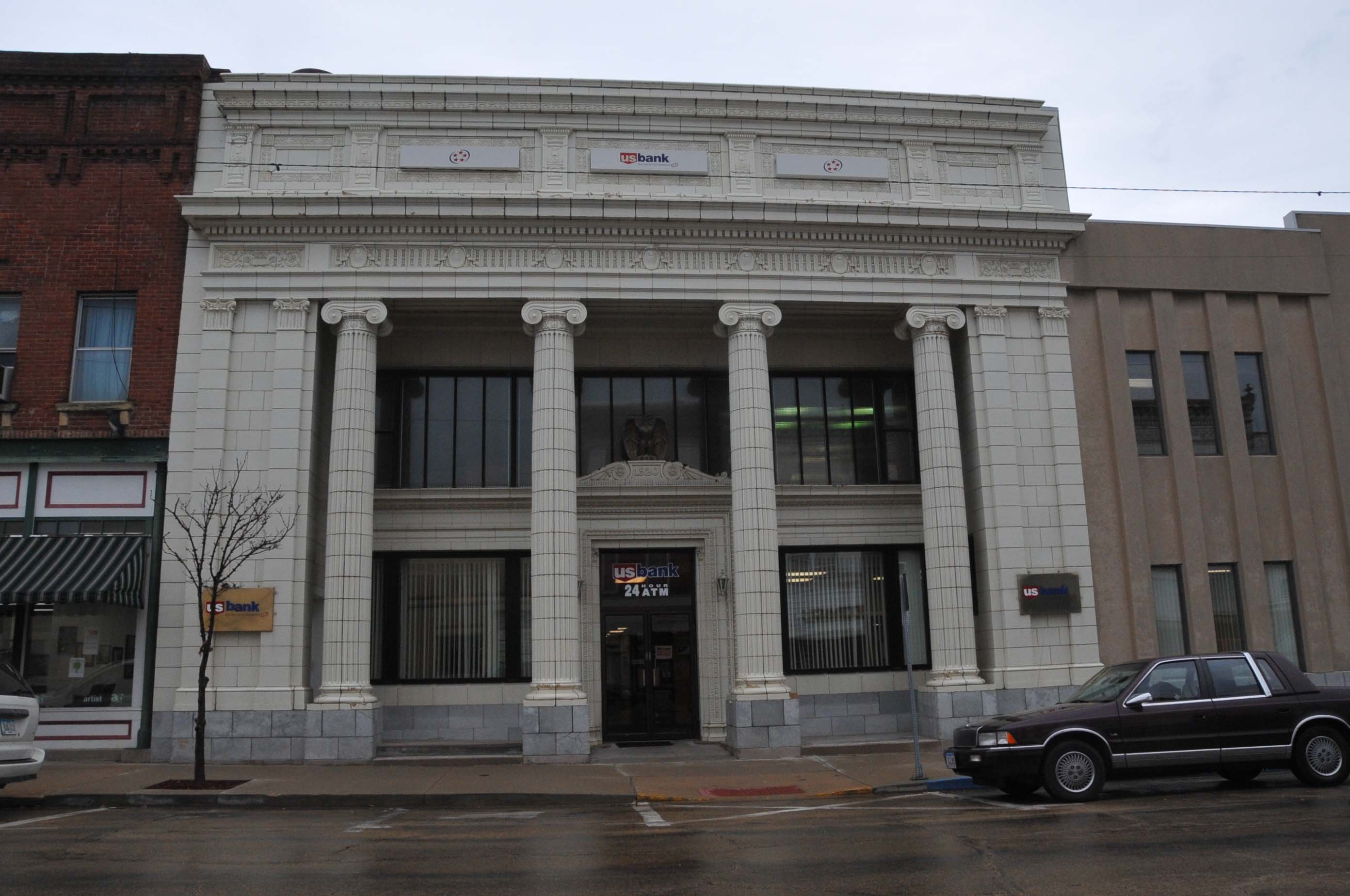

- Location within Iowa Location within the United States
- Location: 120 S. Main; Maquoketa, Iowa
- Coordinates: 42°04′06″N 90°39′57″W
- Area: less than one acre
- Built: 1920
- Architect: Lytle Company
- Architectural style: Classical Revival
- MPS: Maquoketa MPS
- NRHP reference No.: 89002108
- Added to NRHP: August 9, 1991

The First National Bank, now known as U.S. Bank, is a historic building located in Maquoketa, Iowa, United States. The Lytle Company of Sioux City, Iowa designed this building for First National Bank. Between 1913 and 1923 they were responsible for designing at least twenty-five bank buildings in Iowa, mostly in smaller communities. The Neoclassical style building is faced with terra cotta produced by the American Terra Cotta Company of Chicago. Completed in 1920, the two-story, double-wide structure features four columns in the Ionic order. Its various design elements include Greek key, Egg-and-dart, foliated rinceau, rosettes, anthemion, and volutes. First National Bank failed in the Great Depression, and the building was taken over by Jackson State Bank. It now houses a branch of US Bank. The building was listed on the National Register of Historic Places in 1991.
