= Iowa Falls Bridge =

- U.S. National Register of Historic Places
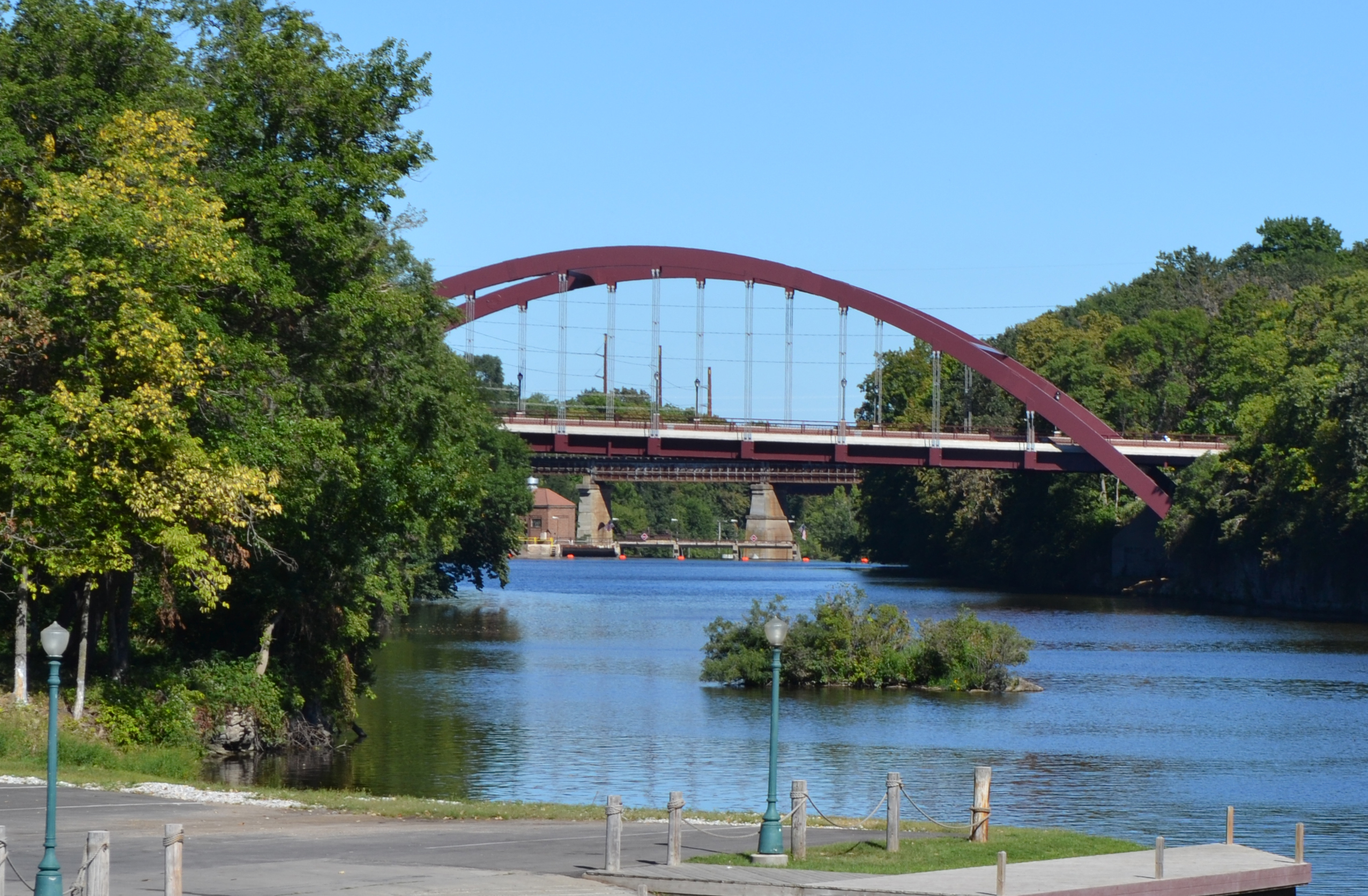
- Replacement bridge over the Iowa River

- Location within Iowa Location within the United States
- Location: U.S. Route 65 over the Iowa River, Iowa Falls, Iowa
- Coordinates: 42°31′6″N 93°15′46″W
- Area: less than one acre
- Built: 1928
- Built by: Weldon Brothers Construction Co.
- Architect: Iowa State Highway Commission
- Architectural style: Through arch bridge
- MPS: Highway Bridges of Iowa MPS
- NRHP reference No.: 98000516
- Added to NRHP: May 15, 1998

The Iowa Falls Bridge, also known as the Oak Street Bridge, was a historic structure located in Iowa Falls, Iowa, United States. The span carried U.S. Route 65 over the Iowa River for 255 feet (78 m). The through arch bridge was built by the Weldon Brothers Construction Co. of Iowa Falls in 1928 for $51,374.98. At the time it was completed the bridge was the longest arch span in the state of Iowa. It was listed on the National Register of Historic Places in 1998. The historic bridge was demolished and replaced in 2010.
