= Spirit Lake Public Library =

- U.S. National Register of Historic Places
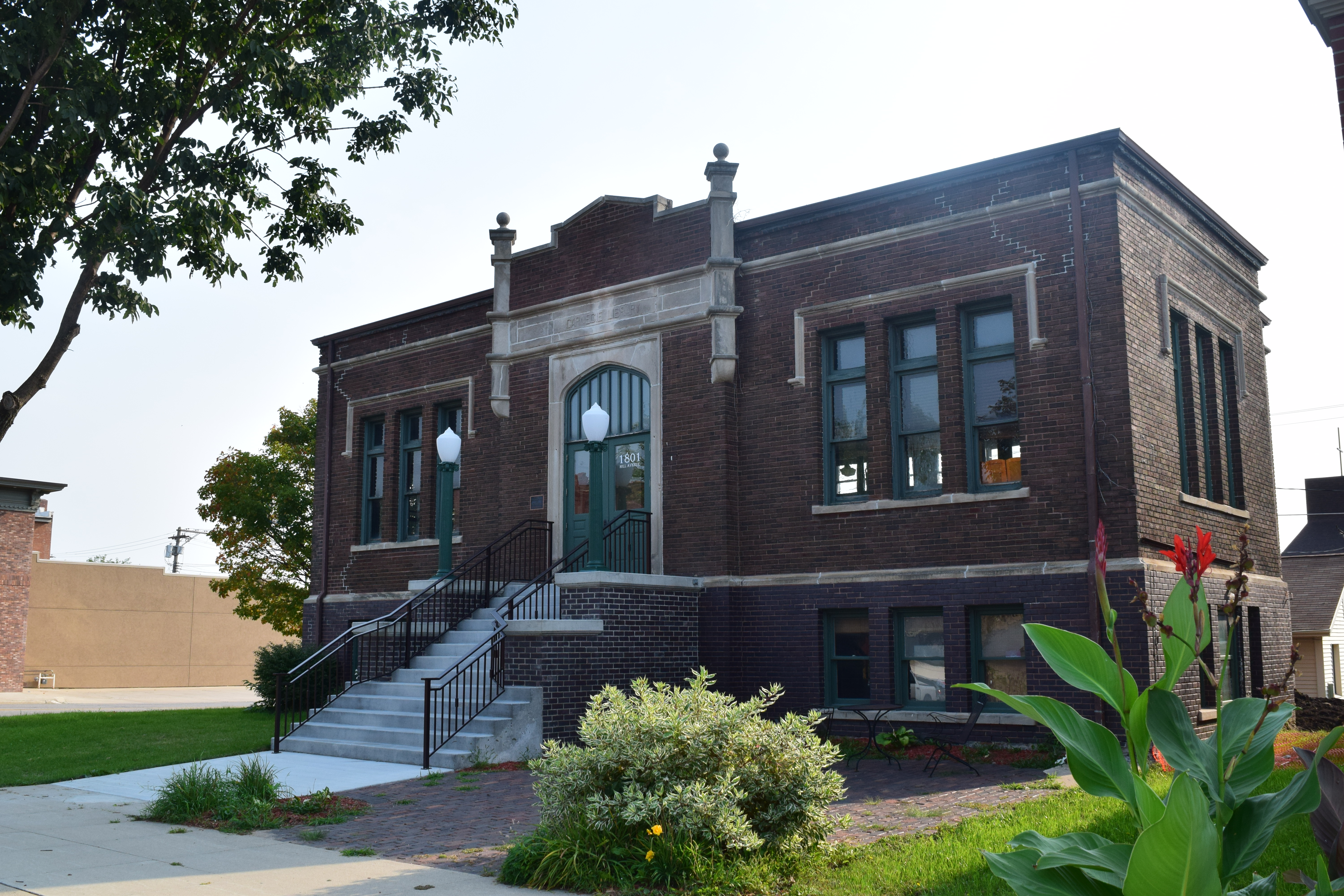

- Location within Iowa Location within the United States
- Location: 1801 Hill Ave. Spirit Lake, Iowa
- Coordinates: 43°25′20″N 95°06′07″W
- Area: less than one acre
- Built: 1912
- Architect: Frank W. Kinney
- NRHP reference No.: 80001448
- Added to NRHP: January 24, 1980

The former Spirit Lake Public Library is located in downtown Spirit Lake, Iowa, United States. The Civic Improvement Association started a library in a rented commercial building downtown in 1901. The initial collections were acquired through Iowa's traveling library system. A referendum to support a public library was passed in 1904, which made a grant from the Carnegie Corporation of New York possible. Spirit Lake's application was accepted for a grant for $8,000 on February 1, 1905. The search for a lot for the building delayed construction. The library was dedicated on September 24, 1912. The single-story brick structure was built on a raised basement, and features vaguely Tudor Revival elements. The center frontispiece and the tall windows give it a sense of verticality. The building was listed on the National Register of Historic Places in 1980. The public library has subsequently been relocated into a new building, and the historic building has been converted into commercial space.
