= Alden Public Library =

- U.S. National Register of Historic Places
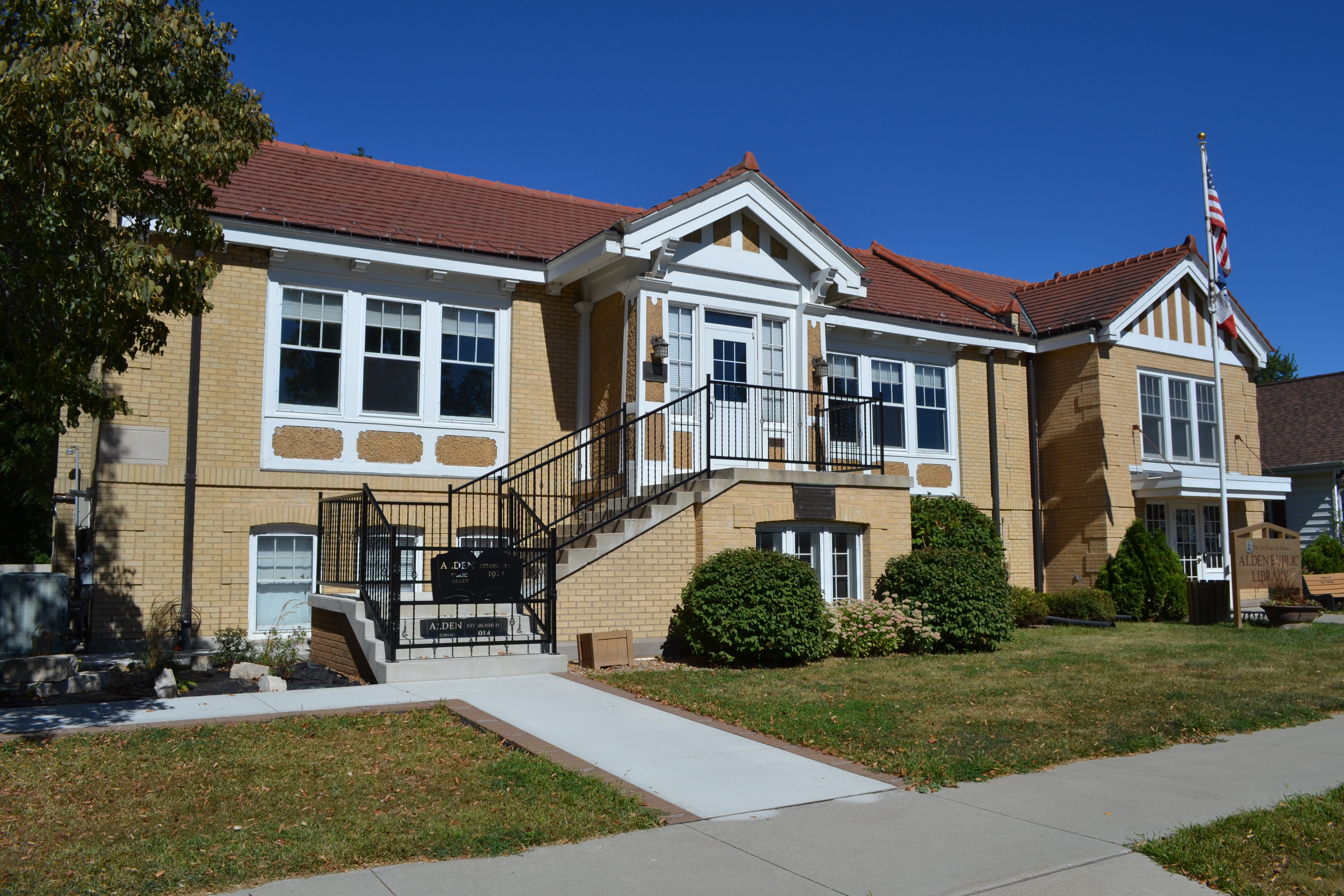

- Location within Iowa Location within the United States
- Location: 1012 Water St. Alden, Iowa
- Coordinates: 42°31′7″N 93°22′1″W
- Area: less than one acre
- Built: 1914
- Architect: Wetherell & Gage
- NRHP reference No.: 81000241
- Added to NRHP: March 17, 1981

Alden Public Library is located in Alden, Iowa, United States. Alden was one of the smallest communities to receive a Carnegie library.

== History ==
The community's first library association was formed in 1882, and they acquired 225 books. The annual membership fee to use the library was $1. It was discontinued within two years, and Alden's second library association was formed in 1885 by women in the community. In time they were able to build their own building in 1892 and convince the city government to take over its support. Shortly after the city took over they contacted the Carnegie Foundation, who funded the construction of a new building with a $9,000 grant. The chief factor in Alden's success in obtaining a Carnegie grant was that its library served the large farming area around it.

== Building ==
It was designed by the Des Moines architectural firm of Wetherell & Gage, and shows Beaux Arts styling. The new building was dedicated on August 26, 1914. It is believed to be one of the smallest Carnegie libraries ever built. The building was listed on the National Register of Historic Places in 1981.

More space for the library became necessary, and plans were made to double its size. A bond issue was passed in 1997, and fundraising included $250,000 from the Dr. Grace O. Doane Foundation. The new addition was dedicated on June 17, 2000, and the library's name now honors Dr. Doane.
