= Sigourney Public Library =

- U.S. National Register of Historic Places
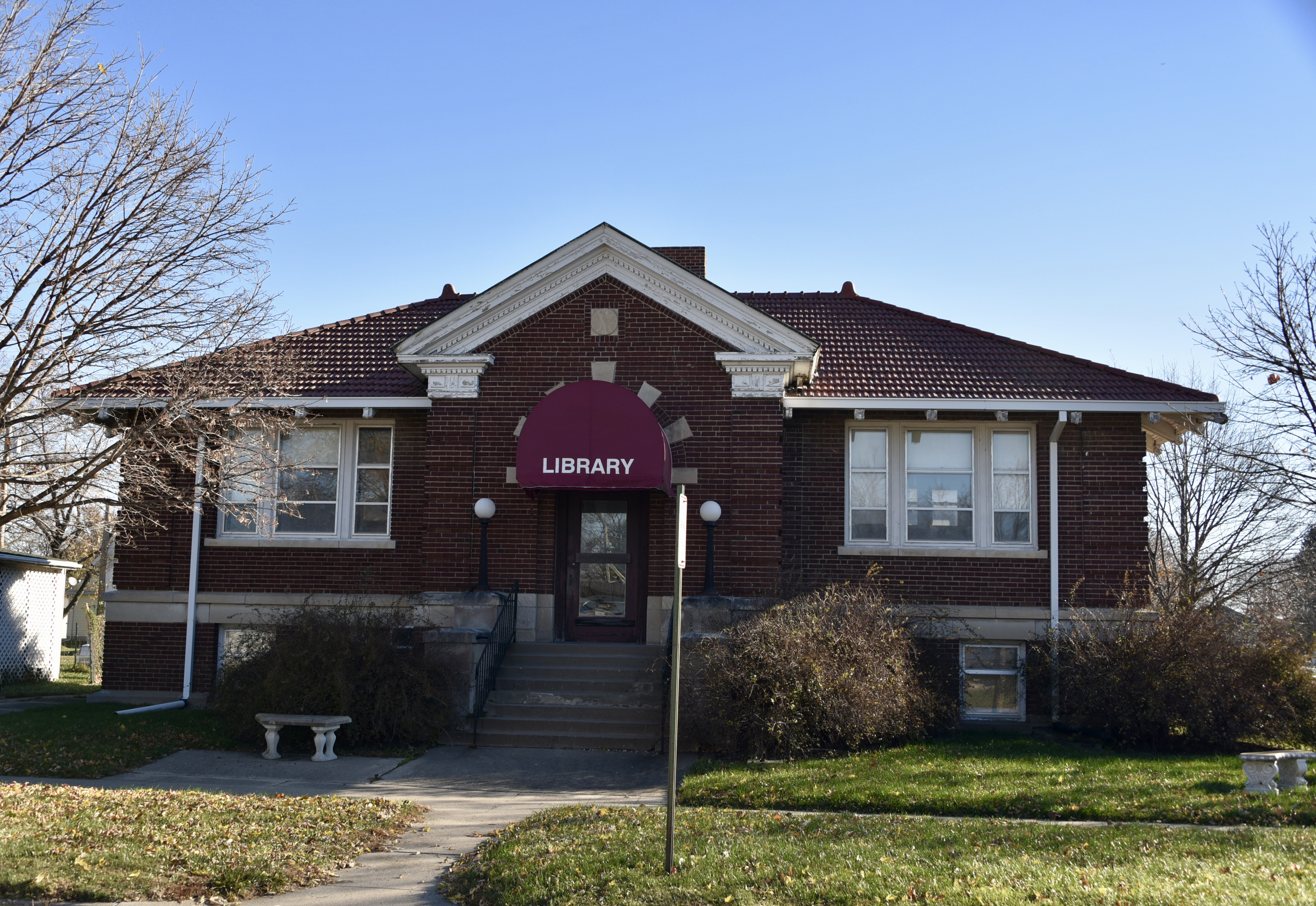
- The Carnegie library building

- Location within Iowa Location within the United States
- Location: 203 N. Jefferson St; Sigourney, Iowa
- Coordinates: 41°20′5.55″N 92°12′13.23″W
- Area: less than one acre
- Built: 1913-1914
- Architect: Patton, Holmes & Flinn
- Architectural style: Bungalow/Colonial Revival
- MPS: Public Library Buildings in Iowa TR
- NRHP reference No.: 83000381
- Added to NRHP: May 23, 1983

Sigourney Public Library is located in Sigourney, Iowa, United States. After the Keokuk County Courthouse was completed in 1911 the local community formed a library committee to build a new public library. They purchased the property in 1912 and received $10,000 from the Carnegie Corporation of New York to fund the new building. The Chicago architectural firm of Patton, Holmes & Flinn designed the new library in a combination of the Bungalow and Colonial Revival styles. The single-story brick structure is built on a raised foundation. It features an entrance that is slightly projected, a symmetrical facade, and it is capped with a hipped roof. It was dedicated in May 1914, and was one of 101 public libraries that were built in Iowa with assistance from the Carnegie Corporation. The building was listed on the National Register of Historic Places in 1983. The Sigourney Public Library moved to its present location in the renovated Blackie's Grocery Store building located on Iowa Highway 92 in 2005.
