= Former Mount Pleasant Public Library =

- Mount Pleasant Public Library
- U.S. National Register of Historic Places
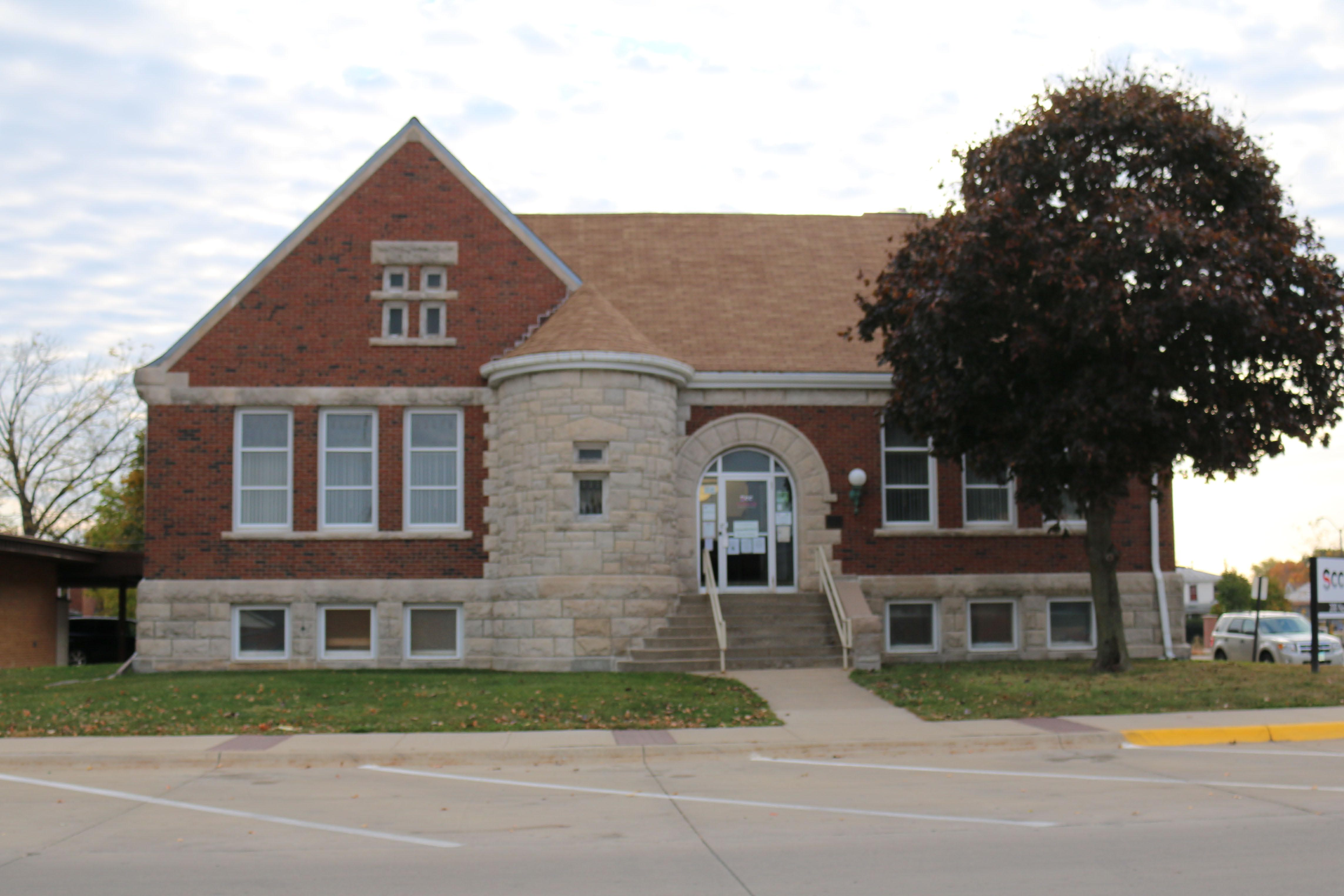

- Location within Iowa Location within the United States
- Location: 200 N. Main St. Mount Pleasant, Iowa
- Coordinates: 40°58′03.9″N 91°33′09.2″W
- Area: less than one acre
- Built: 1903-1904
- Architect: Patton & Miller
- Architectural style: Romanesque
- NRHP reference No.: 83000367
- Added to NRHP: May 23, 1983

The Former Mount Pleasant Public Library is a historic building located in Mount Pleasant, Iowa, United States. The library here was established in 1875. The community applied to Andrew Carnegie for a grant to build a new building, which was accepted on January 13, 1903. They were initially granted $10,000 and then were given a further $2,500. The Chicago architectural firm Patton & Miller designed the Romanesque Revival structure. They adapted Henry Hobson Richardson's Thomas Crane Public Library (1882) for this building. Unlike the Crane Library, this building is primarily brick with rough stone used for a short tower on the main facade and for the trim. It also features an asymmetrical grouping of intersecting gables. The building opened on Wednesday, February 22, 1905. An addition was built onto the rear of the building in 1926. It was designed by the Des Moines architectural firm of Dougher, Rich & Woodburn. The building was listed on the National Register of Historic Places in 1983. The library has subsequently moved to another facility and this building now houses a branch of Southeastern Community College.
