= Woodbine Public Library =

- U.S. National Register of Historic Places
- U.S. Historic district – Contributing property
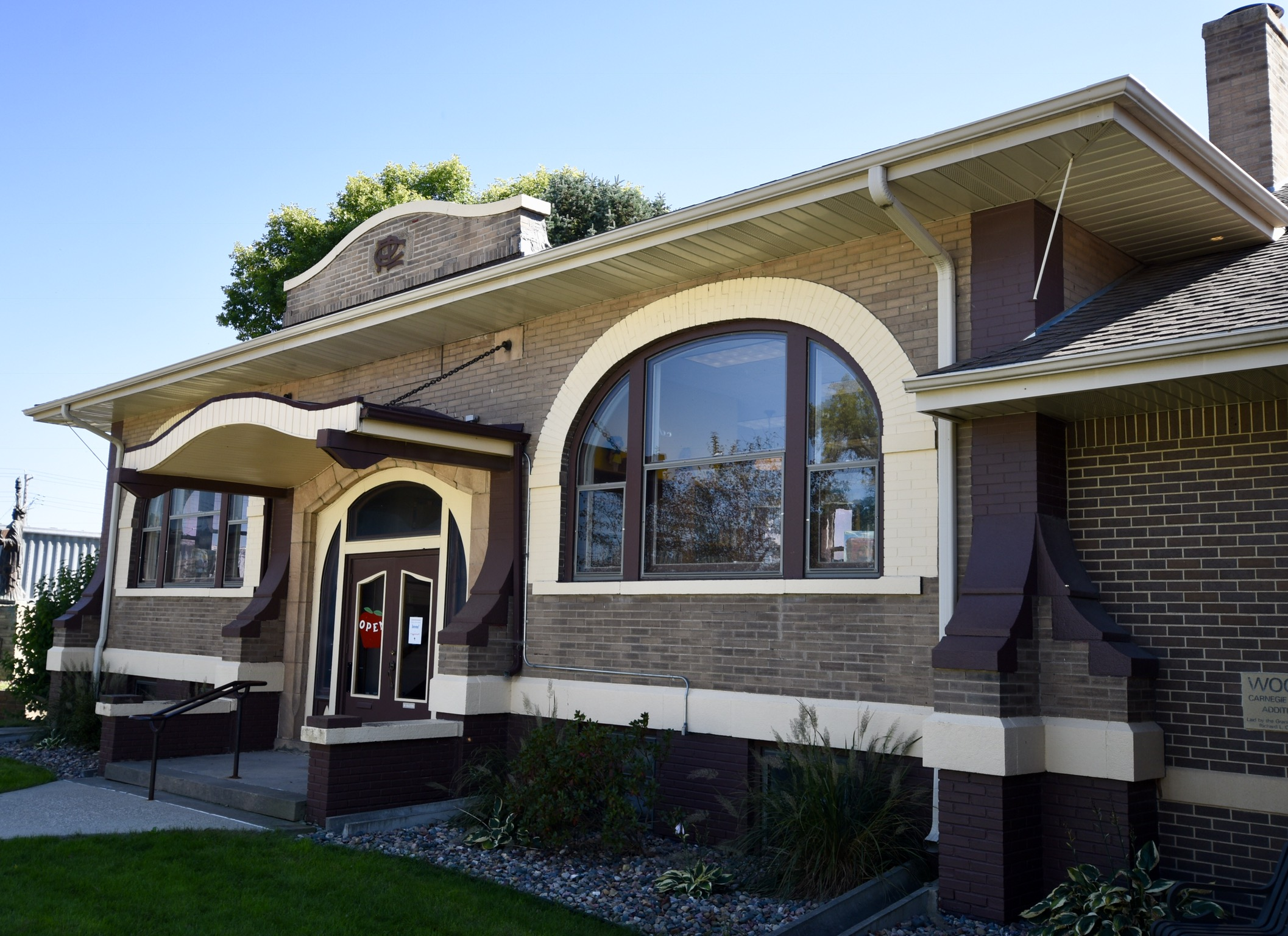

- Location within Iowa Location within the United States
- Location: 58 5th St. Woodbine, Iowa
- Coordinates: 41°44′12.6″N 95°42′12.6″W
- Area: less than one acre
- Built: 1910
- Built by: F. X. White
- Architect: Eisentraut Company
- Architectural style: Prairie School
- Part of: Woodbine Lincoln Highway and Brick Street Historic District (ID12001083)
- NRHP reference No.: 97000462
- Added to NRHP: May 23, 1997

Woodbine Public Library, also known as Carnegie Public Library, is located in Woodbine, Iowa, United States. The library was organized in 1907, and it was initially housed in the jail section of city hall. If there was inmate in the jail the public had no access to the library. The city council appointed a board of trustees in 1908 and they applied to the Andrew Carnegie for a grant to build a library building. They received a grant on April 28, 1909, for $7,500. The Eisentraut Company, a Sioux City architectural firm designed the Prairie School building. F. X. White of Eldora, Iowa was the contractor. The building was completed in February 1909, and it was dedicated on March 9 of the same year. This was the first library built in Harrison County.

The single-story brick structure is capped with a hipped roof. The Prairie School influences are found in the building's low, horizontal orientation, and its wide overhanging eaves with modillion blocks. The Mission Revival influence is found in the original clay tile roof, the curvilinear forms on the parapet and the hood of the entry porch hood, and the round-arched windows. The original tile roof was replaced with asphalt shingles after a hailstorm in 1980. An addition was added to the west side of the building in 2001. The building was listed on the National Register of Historic Places in 1997. In 2013 it was included as a contributing property in the Woodbine Lincoln Highway and Brick Street Historic District.
