= Waverly Public Library =

Library in Waverly, Iowa, United States

Coordinates: 42.72614°N 92.48927°W

The Waverly Public Library, located in Waverly, Iowa, is a public library that serves Waverly and the surrounding counties of Bremer and Butler. As of April 2011, the library contains 66,790 volumes, including over 2,000 DVDs and over 1,000 CDs. The library circulates approximately 166,909 items every year.

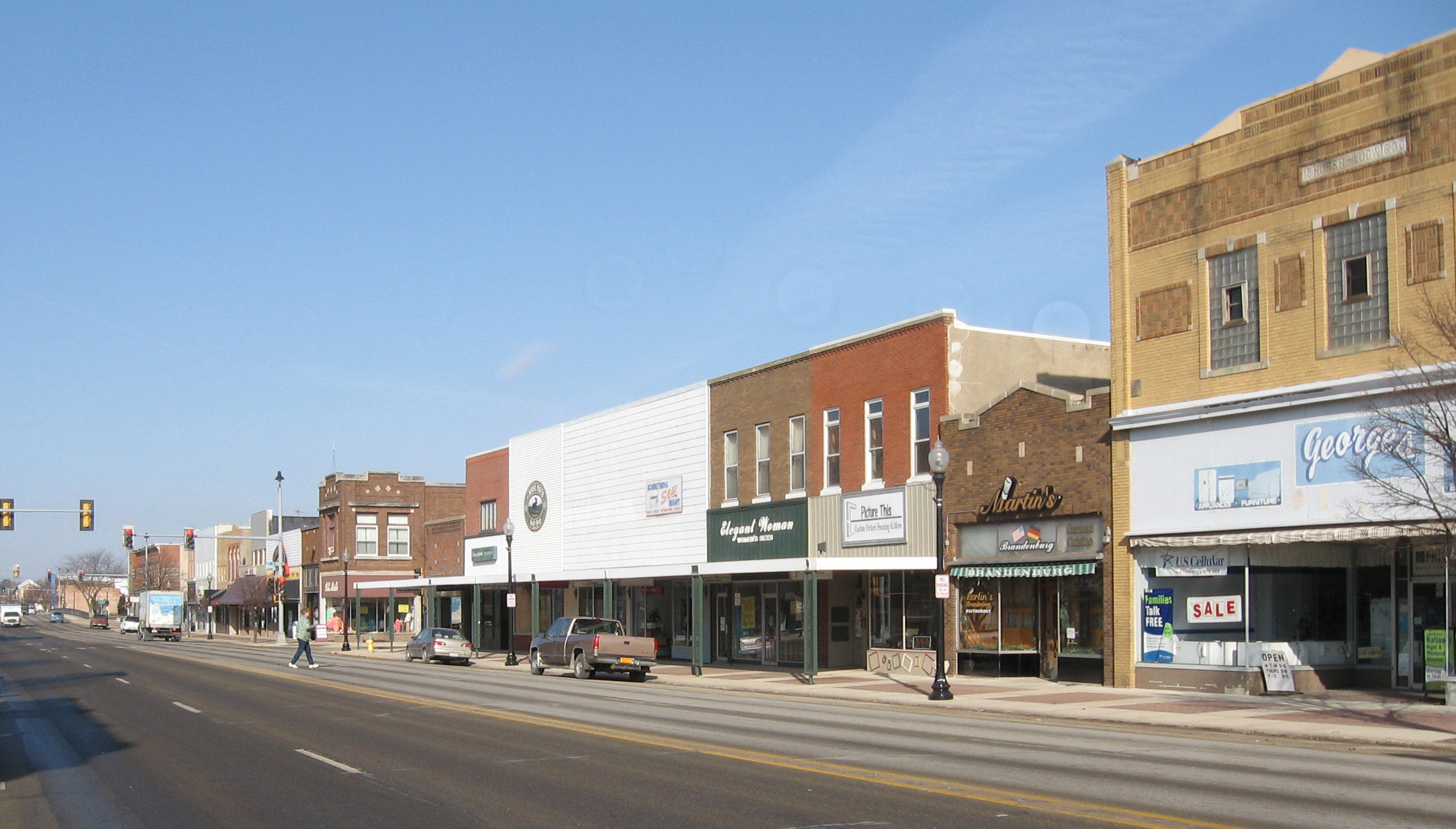
Waverly, Iowa, is home to the Waverly Public Library. Waverly has a population of approximately 12,000 people.

== History ==
In 1857, two years before Waverly was incorporated, a committee was organized for the purpose of collecting books for the public's general use. Ten years later the First Baptist Church housed the collection in their new building. The Waverly Public Free Library was created in 1868, following a lecture series which raised more than $300. This lecture series included programs featuring Clara Barton, Frederick Douglass, John Heyl Vincent, and Paul Du Chaillu. The money raised was placed in a fund for developing an actual library building. The books were next stored in the Waverly Opera House, and then moved to rooms over Broadie's Drug Store in 1901.

On February 20, 1903, Andrew Carnegie, a wealthy New York philanthropist, awarded Waverly a $10,000 grant to construct a new library building. The new library was dedicated on January 1, 1905, and opened to the public for their use. At that time, the population of Waverly was 2,916 and the library owned less than 2,000 books.

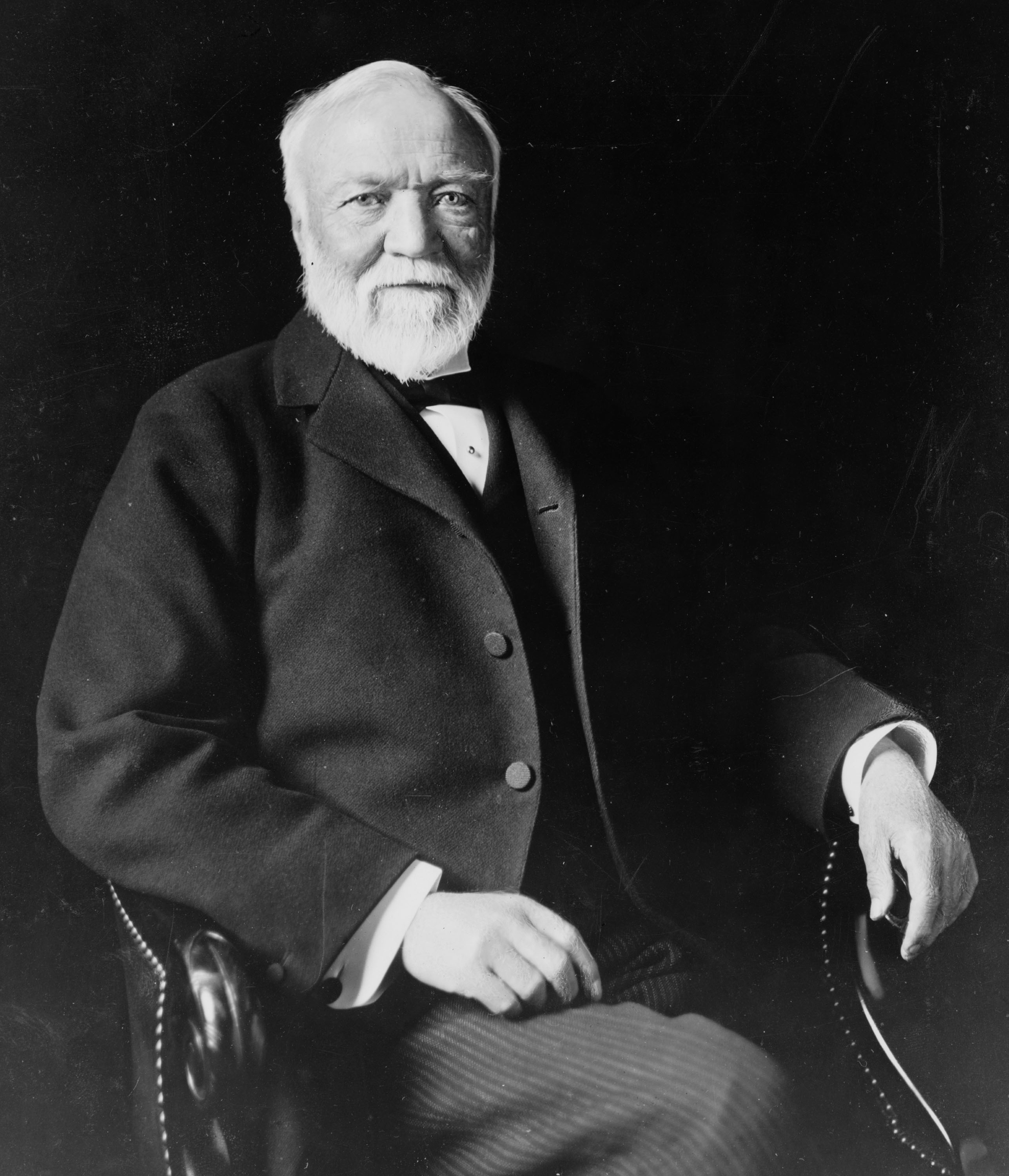
Andrew Carnegie, New York philanthropist, awarded the city of Waverly a $10,000 grant to construct a free public library in 1903.

By 1965, the library had 7,872 registered borrowers, and the collection totaled over 30,000 books. A "wrap-around" structure was built in 1968 to accommodate the increase in patrons and materials. In 1992, the city of Waverly ordered that a study be done to consider the library's future options. It was decided that a new library building would be constructed at a different location, and so in 1998 the present building was completed.

== Directors ==
Following is a list of the men and women who have provided leadership at the Waverly Public Library through their role as Director.

- 1857 C.T. Smeed
- 1878 Miss Josie Powell
- 1879 Mrs. Thompson Hauser
- 1881-1891 Rev. John Hodges
- 1891-1894 Sylvia Fitzgerald
- 1894 Anna Mills
- 1896-1900 Mrs. Joseph Brown
- 1901-1903 Mae Brotherton
- 1903-1910 Mary Whitmire (died 1910)
- 1910-1911 Dr. Vera Norton
- 1911 Marian Grawe (interim)
- 1911-1933 Emma L. Kenney
- 1933-1937 Florence A. Grove
- 1937-1954 Arlene Russell
- 1954-1956 Rachel Agg
- 1956-1958 Clara Johnson
- 1958-1973 Marjorie Humby
- 1973-1975 Steve Rogge
- 1976 G. Shirley Duis
- 1976 Jane Huck (interim)
- 1976-2005 Patricia Coffie
- 2005–present Sarah Meyer-Reyerson

== Services ==
Interactive videoconference rooms, wireless internet access, 18 public internet computers and computer classes are available for public use. Three Nintendo Switch consoles with games are available for public use as well. Children and their parents can take advantage of a summer reading program and preschool storytime. A Teen Advisory Board plans creative activities for the community's youth, including weekly game events. An active Friends of the Waverly Public Library group is a non-profit organization that provides volunteer support and funding for library projects. These include bus trips to the library for elementary classes, books for new babies at the local hospital, books for kindergarten students, and used book and magazine sales.
