= Fairfield Public Library =

- U.S. National Register of Historic Places
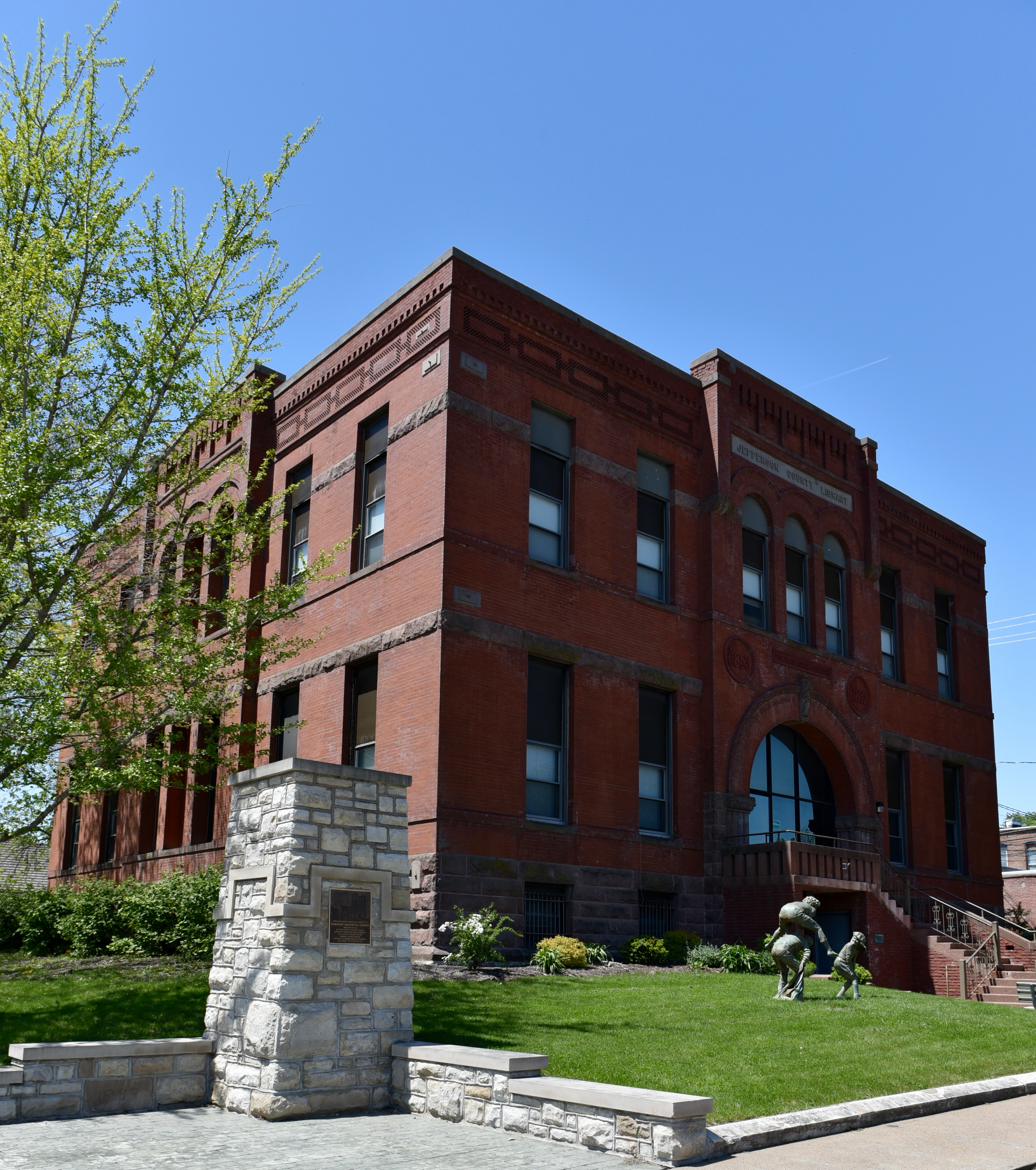

- Location within Iowa Location within the United States
- Location: Court and Washington; Fairfield, Iowa
- Coordinates: 41°0′21″N 91°57′46″W
- Area: less than one acre
- Built: 1893
- Architect: C. Stafford
- Architectural style: Richardsonian Romanesque
- MPS: Public Library Buildings in Iowa TR
- NRHP reference No.: 83000373
- Added to NRHP: May 23, 1983

Fairfield Public Library is located in Fairfield, Iowa, United States. A library association was founded by a group of local men in 1853, and funded by dues from its members. It was housed in several different buildings for the first 40 years. U.S. Senator James F. Wilson from Fairfield was instrumental in obtaining a grant from Andrew Carnegie for a building of its own. The grant for $40,000 was accepted on January 15, 1892. It was the first Carnegie Library outside of Western Pennsylvania and the first of 101 built in Iowa. It was also one the few libraries Carnegie funded without stipulations concerning its use, public support, or design. The building was designed in the Richardsonian Romanesque style by Kansas City architect C. Stafford. It was officially opened on Friday, September 29, 1893, and it was dedicated on November 28 of the same year. The association continued to run the library until 1899 when voters approved a referendum to support it with taxes. The building has been altered in the ensuing years, and it was listed on the National Register of Historic Places in 1983. The library moved to a new building in 1996, and the original building is now home to the Carnegie Historical Museum.
