= Hamburg Public Library (Hamburg, Iowa) =

Library in Iowa, U.S.

- U.S. National Register of Historic Places
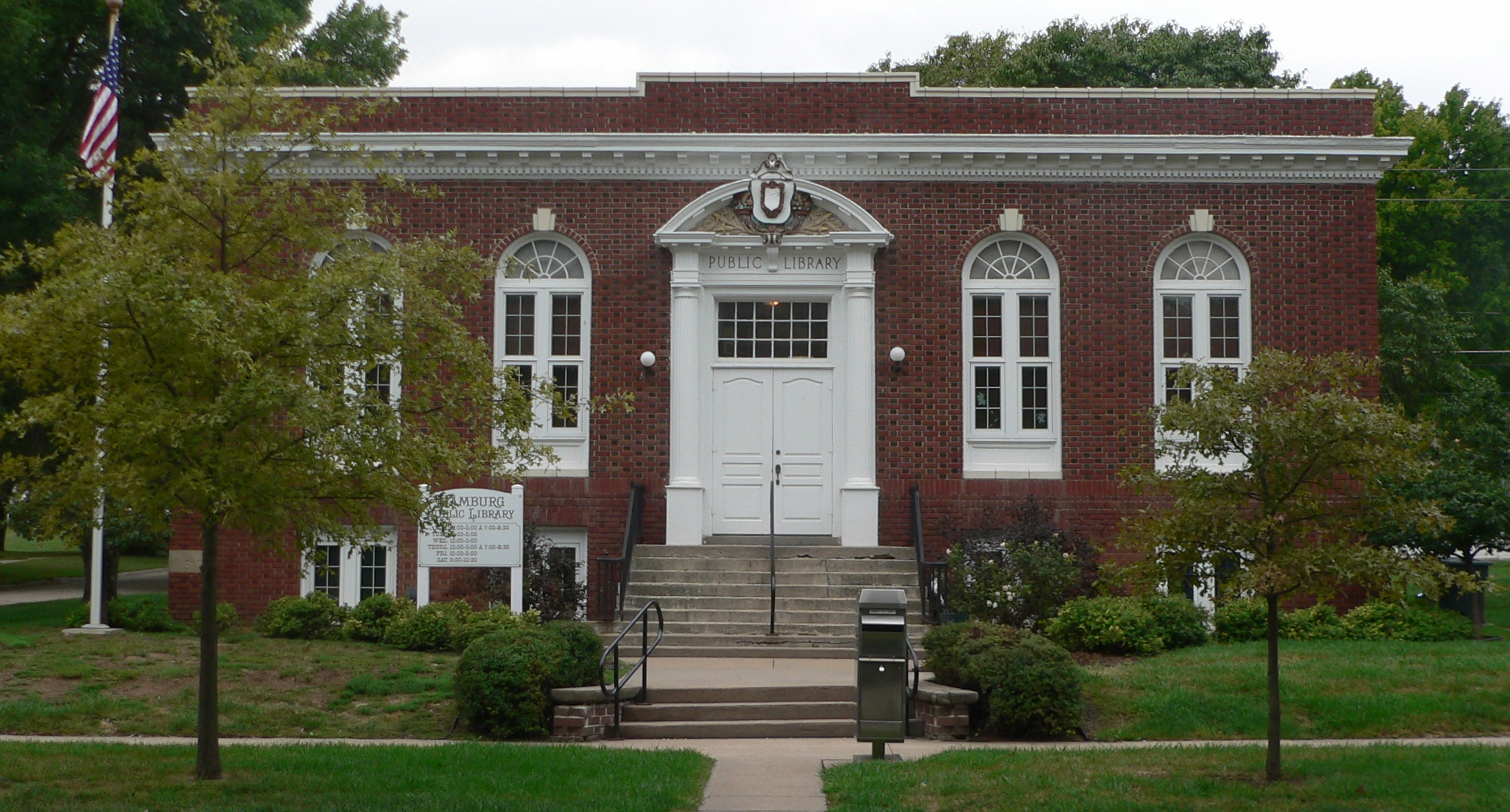

- Location within Iowa Location within the United States
- Location: 1301 Main St. Hamburg, Iowa
- Coordinates: 40°36′23″N 95°39′27″W
- Area: less than one acre
- Built: 1919
- Architectural style: Georgian Revival
- MPS: Public Library Buildings in Iowa TR
- NRHP reference No.: 83000359
- Added to NRHP: May 23, 1983

Hamburg Public Library is located in Hamburg, Iowa, United States. The Carnegie Corporation of New York accepted Hamburg's application for a grant for $9,000 on December 3, 1915. It was dedicated on June 9, 1919. The Georgian Revival style building is five bays wide with its main entrance in the center bay. The single-story brick structure follows a simple rectangular plan. It was listed on the National Register of Historic Places in 1983.
