= Alden, Iowa =

City in Iowa, United States

- City
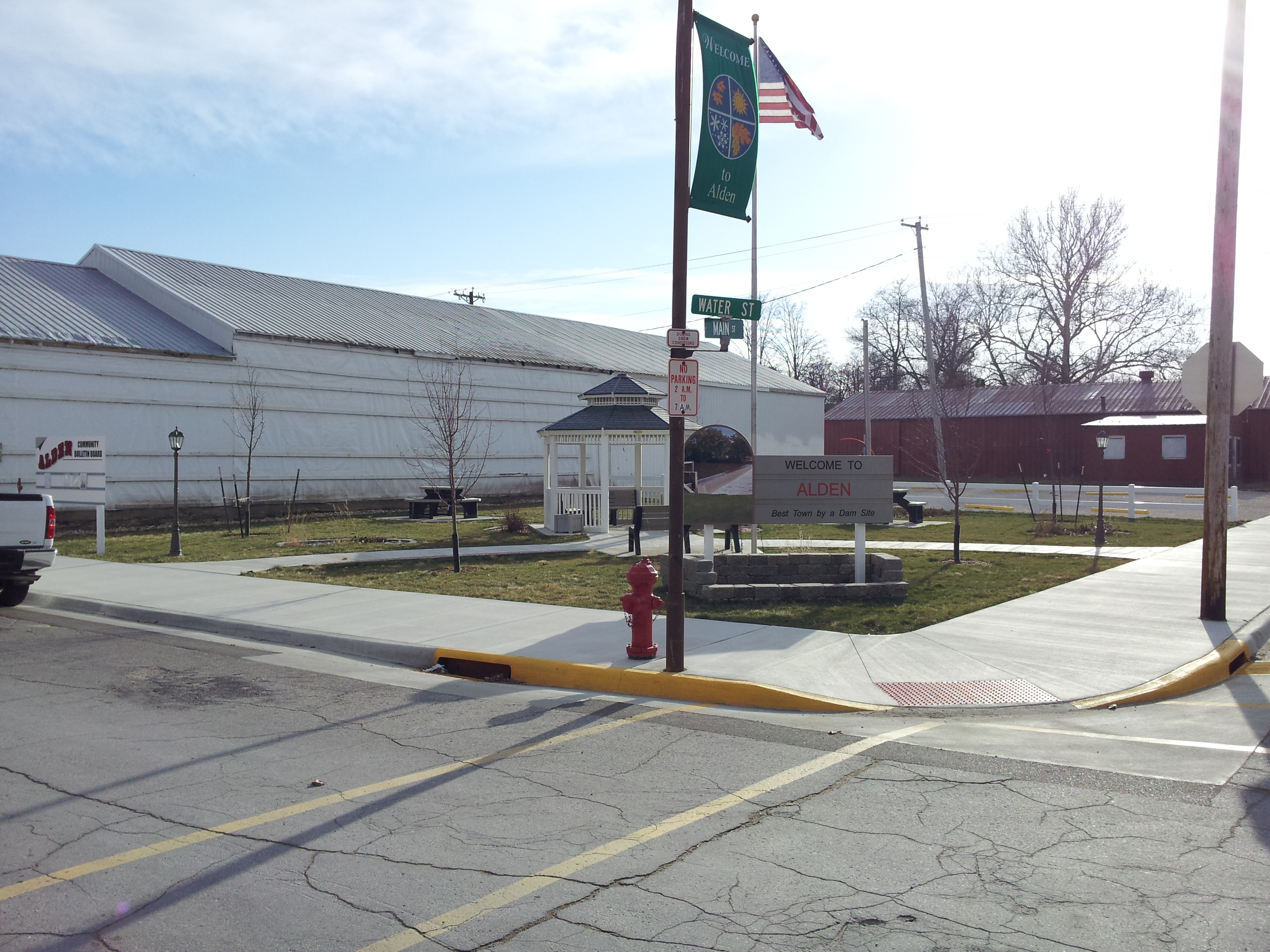
- Main Street and Water Street in 2012

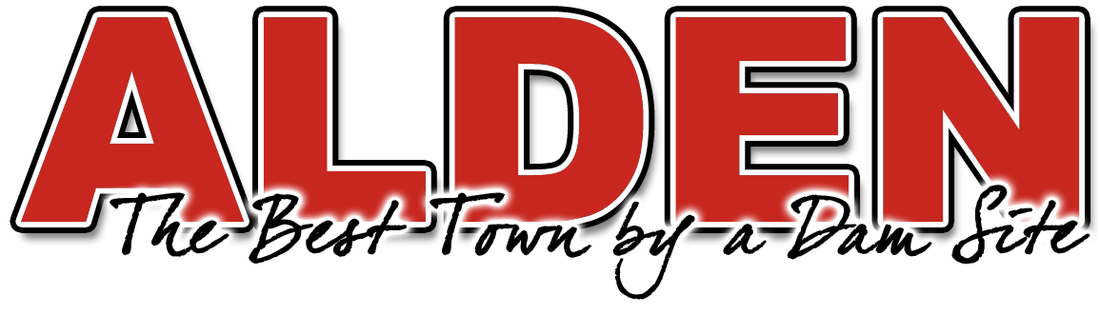
- Wordmark

- Location of Alden, Iowa
- Coordinates: 42°30′14″N 93°22′53″W
- Country: United States
- State: Iowa
- County: Hardin

Government
  - Mayor: Harley Mourlam

Area
  - Total: 1.54 sq mi (3.99 km^{2})
  - Land: 1.54 sq mi (3.99 km^{2})
  - Water: 0 sq mi (0.00 km^{2})
- Elevation: 1,165 ft (355 m)

Population (2020)
  - Total: 763
  - Density: 495.2/sq mi (191.19/km^{2})
- Time zone: UTC-6 (Central (CST))
  - Summer (DST): UTC-5 (CDT)
- ZIP codes: 50006, 50043
- Area code: 515
- FIPS code: 19-01045
- GNIS feature ID: 2393911
- Website: cityofalden.com

Alden is a city in Hardin County, Iowa, United States. The population was 763 at the 2020 census.

== History ==
Alden was laid out in 1855. It was named for its founder, Henry Alden, a native of Massachusetts. The town was incorporated February 11, 1879.

== Geography ==
According to the United States Census Bureau, the city has a total area of 1.73 square miles (4.48 km^{2}), of which 1.71 square miles (4.43 km^{2}) is land and 0.02 square miles (0.05 km^{2}) is water.

== Demographics ==
Historical populations
Year	Pop.	±%
1880	495	—
1890	512	+3.4%
1900	709	+38.5%
1910	699	−1.4%
1920	840	+20.2%
1930	793	−5.6%
1940	682	−14.0%
1950	829	+21.6%
1960	838	+1.1%
1970	876	+4.5%
1980	953	+8.8%
1990	855	−10.3%
2000	904	+5.7%
2010	787	−12.9%
2020	763	−3.0%
Source:"U.S. Census website". United States Census Bureau. and Iowa Data Center; Source: U.S. Decennial Census

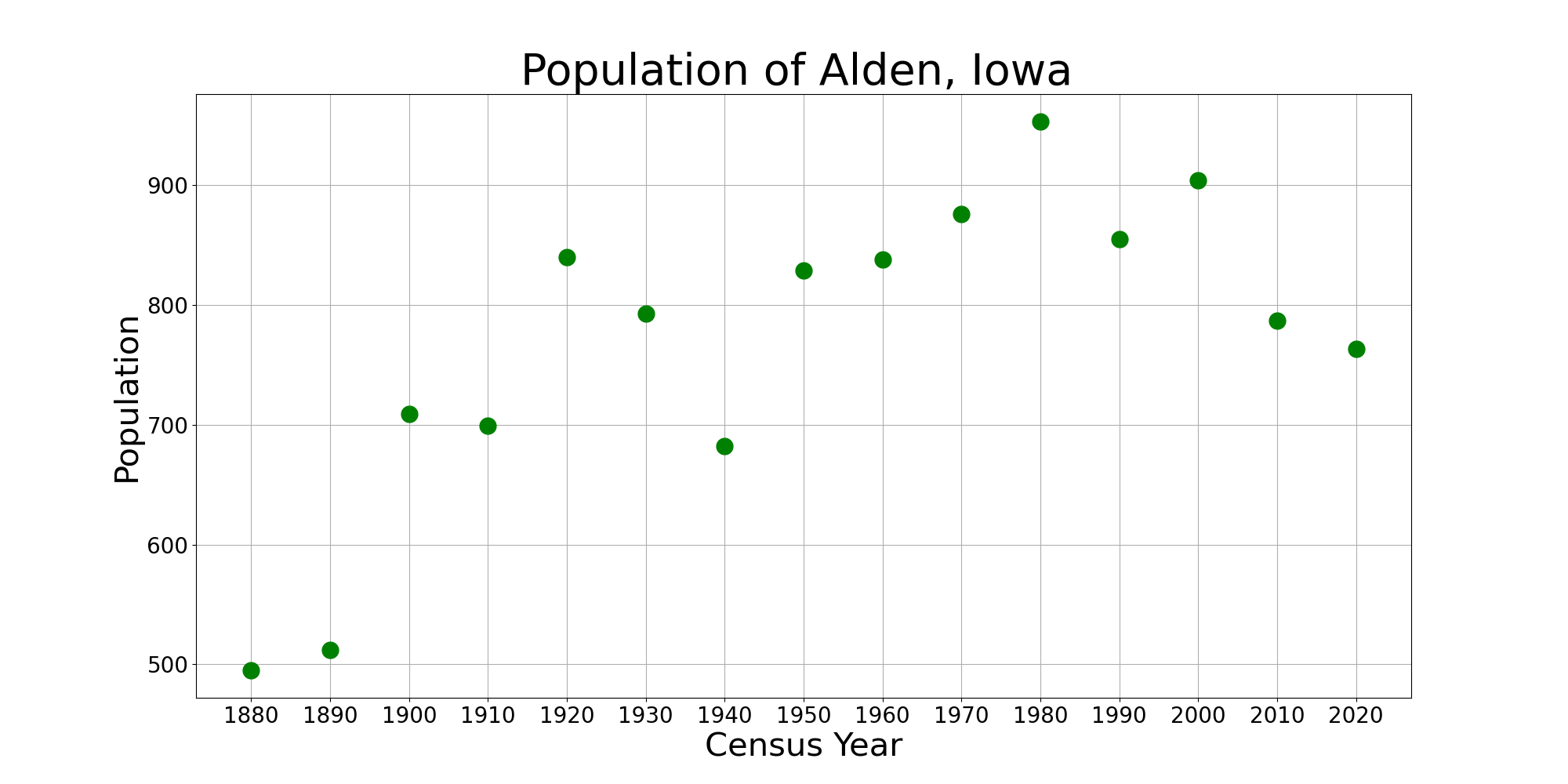
The population of Alden, Iowa from US census data

=== 2020 census ===
As of the census of 2020, there were 763 people, 327 households, and 205 families residing in the city. The population density was 495.2 inhabitants per square mile (191.2/km^{2}). There were 356 housing units at an average density of 231.0 per square mile (89.2/km^{2}). The racial makeup of the city was 91.9% White, 0.1% Black or African American, 0.0% Native American, 0.0% Asian, 0.3% Pacific Islander, 1.4% from other races and 6.3% from two or more races. Hispanic or Latino persons of any race comprised 6.0% of the population.

Of the 327 households, 27.2% of which had children under the age of 18 living with them, 49.2% were married couples living together, 7.3% were cohabitating couples, 26.0% had a female householder with no spouse or partner present and 17.4% had a male householder with no spouse or partner present. 37.3% of all households were non-families. 31.5% of all households were made up of individuals, 16.8% had someone living alone who was 65 years old or older.

The median age in the city was 41.4 years. 26.6% of the residents were under the age of 20; 4.3% were between the ages of 20 and 24; 23.7% were from 25 and 44; 23.3% were from 45 and 64; and 22.0% were 65 years of age or older. The gender makeup of the city was 49.0% male and 51.0% female.

=== 2010 census ===
As of the census of 2010, there were 787 people, 338 households, and 214 families living in the city. The population density was 460.2 inhabitants per square mile (177.7/km^{2}). There were 368 housing units at an average density of 215.2 per square mile (83.1/km^{2}). The racial makeup of the city was 97.5% White, 0.5% African American, 0.1% Native American, 0.3% Asian, and 1.7% from two or more races. Hispanic or Latino of any race were 1.1% of the population.

There were 338 households, of which 28.1% had children under the age of 18 living with them, 53.6% were married couples living together, 5.6% had a female householder with no husband present, 4.1% had a male householder with no wife present, and 36.7% were non-families. 31.1% of all households were made up of individuals, and 16.5% had someone living alone who was 65 years of age or older. The average household size was 2.33 and the average family size was 2.95.

The median age in the city was 41.6 years. 23.6% of residents were under the age of 18; 8.1% were between the ages of 18 and 24; 21.3% were from 25 to 44; 29.1% were from 45 to 64; and 17.9% were 65 years of age or older. The gender makeup of the city was 50.6% male and 49.4% female.

=== 2000 census ===
As of the census of 2000, there were 904 people, 351 households, and 250 families living in the city. The population density was 526.2 inhabitants per square mile (203.2/km^{2}). There were 372 housing units at an average density of 216.5 per square mile (83.6/km^{2}). The racial makeup of the city was 97.68% White, 0.22% Asian, 1.66% from other races, and 0.44% from two or more races. Hispanic or Latino of any race were 5.09% of the population.

There were 351 households, out of which 35.0% had children under the age of 18 living with them, 61.3% were married couples living together, 7.4% had a female householder with no husband present, and 28.5% were non-families. 25.1% of all households were made up of individuals, and 14.8% had someone living alone who was 65 years of age or older. The average household size was 2.58 and the average family size was 3.12.

In the city, the population was spread out, with 27.2% under the age of 18, 8.0% from 18 to 24, 28.0% from 25 to 44, 20.7% from 45 to 64, and 16.2% who were 65 years of age or older. The median age was 38 years. For every 100 females, there were 89.1 males. For every 100 females age 18 and over, there were 87.5 males.

The median income for a household in the city was $35,966, and the median income for a family was $39,524. Males had a median income of $29,489 versus $22,000 for females. The per capita income for the city was $16,011. About 6.7% of families and 10.6% of the population were below the poverty line, including 15.7% of those under age 18 and 8.3% of those age 65 or over.

== Education ==
Alden Community School District operates public schools serving the community.

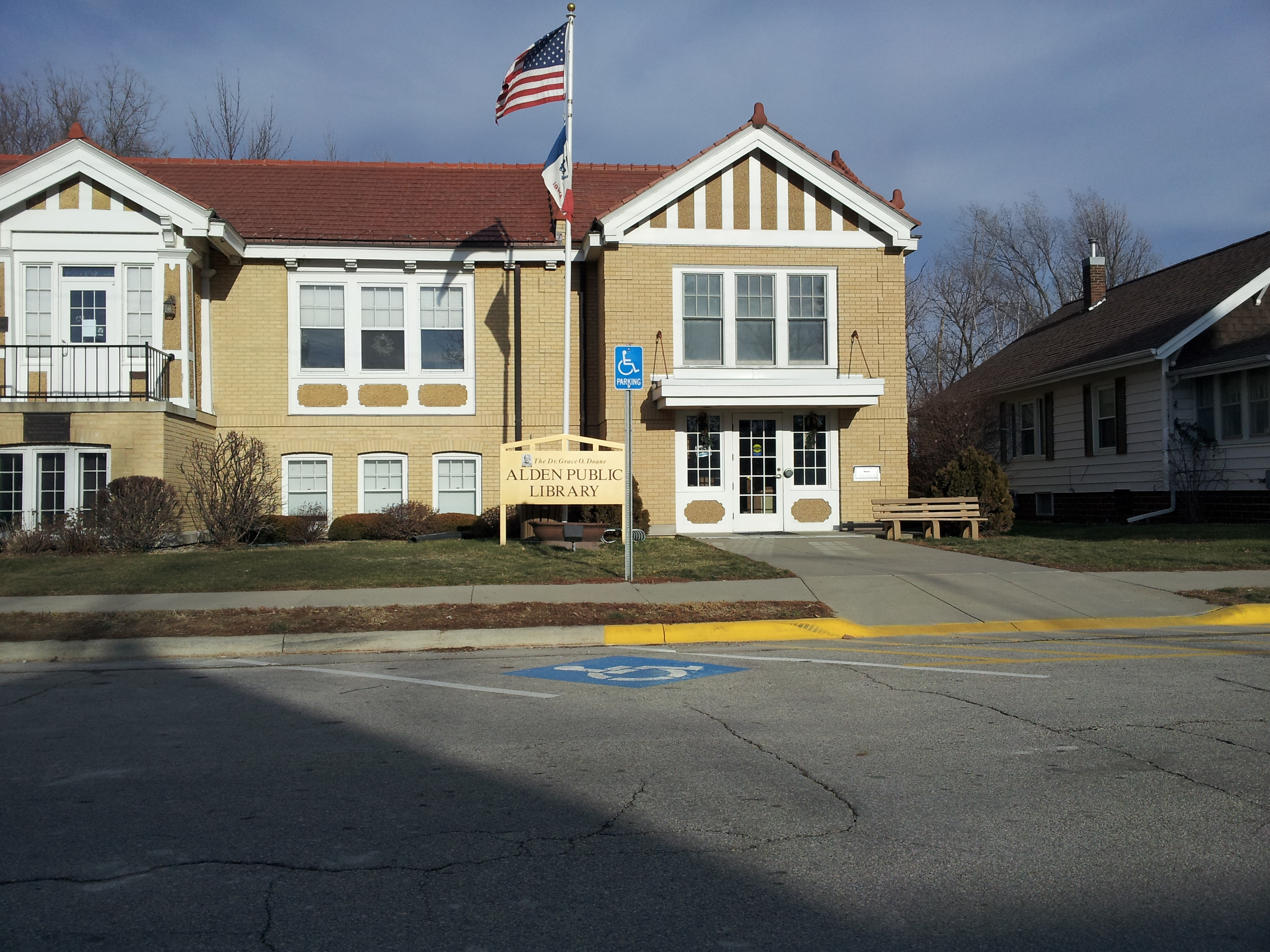
The front of the Alden Public Library

=== Library ===
Alden is believed to have the smallest endowed Carnegie Library built in the United States. It was built at a cost of $9,000, and was a gift from Andrew Carnegie on November 3, 1913.

The original Library was built in 1914 with the grant from the Carnegie Foundation. The Library was placed on the National Register of Historic Places in 1966. The building served Alden for 85 years. In 1998 a Capital Campaign was started to raise $550,000 for an addition that would double the size of the library.

== Notable people ==
- Randy George (b. 1964) United States Army general, 41st Chief of Staff of the United States Army
- Gordon Jones, actor
- Bruce Rastetter, businessman and former president of the Iowa Board of Regents
- Roger A. Towberman, 1st Chief Master Sergeant of the Space Force
