= National Register of Historic Places listings in Hardin County, Iowa =

Location of Hardin County in Iowa

This is a list of the National Register of Historic Places listings in Hardin County, Iowa.

This is intended to be a complete list of the properties and districts on the National Register of Historic Places in Hardin County, Iowa, United States. Latitude and longitude coordinates are provided for many National Register properties and districts; these locations may be seen together in a map.

There are 35 properties and districts listed on the National Register in the county.

This National Park Service list is complete through NPS recent listings posted May 1, 2026.

== Current listings ==
	Name on the Register	Image	Date listed	Location	City or town	Description
1	Alden Bridge	Alden Bridge	May 15, 1998 (#98000517)	Main St. over the Iowa River; 42°31′16″N 93°22′32″W	Alden	
2	Alden Public Library	Alden Public Library	March 17, 1981 (#81000241)	1012 Water St. 42°31′07″N 93°22′01″W	Alden	
3	Carnegie-Ellsworth Public Library	Carnegie-Ellsworth Public Library	May 23, 1983 (#83000363)	520 Rocksylvania Ave. 42°31′18″N 93°15′50″W	Iowa Falls	
4	Civilian Conservation Corps-Prisoner of War Recreation Hall	Civilian Conservation Corps-Prisoner of War Recreation Hall	January 27, 2012 (#11001056)	301 11th Ave. 42°21′45″N 93°05′11″W	Eldora	
5	Edgewood School of Domestic Arts	Edgewood School of Domestic Arts	April 19, 1979 (#79000897)	719 River St. 42°31′26″N 93°16′06″W	Iowa Falls	
6	Eldora Downtown Historic District	Eldora Downtown Historic District	May 12, 2009 (#09000297)	Approximately ten blocks in downtown Eldora around the courthouse square 42°21′37″N 93°05′56″W	Eldora	
7	Eldora Public Library	Eldora Public Library	May 23, 1983 (#83000364)	1219 14th Ave. 42°21′35″N 93°05′55″W	Eldora	
8	Ellsworth-Jones Building	Ellsworth-Jones Building	October 1, 1993 (#93000959)	511 Washington Ave. 42°31′10″N 93°15′49″W	Iowa Falls	
9	Estes Park Band Shell	Estes Park Band Shell	October 1, 1993 (#93000960)	Estes Park; 42°31′15″N 93°15′53″W	Iowa Falls	
10	First Congregational Church	First Congregational Church	December 4, 1996 (#96001372)	1209 12th St. 42°21′41″N 93°05′52″W	Eldora	
11	First National Bank	First National Bank	October 1, 1993 (#93000958)	601 Washington Ave. 42°31′10″N 93°15′52″W	Iowa Falls	
12	Folkert Mound Group	Folkert Mound Group	March 17, 2009 (#09000126)	Address Restricted	Steamboat Rock	
13	Hardin County Courthouse	Hardin County Courthouse	July 2, 1981 (#81000242)	Edgington Ave. 42°21′32″N 93°05′45″W	Eldora	
14	Hardin County Home Historic District	Hardin County Home Historic District	May 24, 2010 (#10000275)	28483 County Road D41; 42°23′25″N 93°08′18″W	Eldora	
15	Honey Creek Friends' Meetinghouse	Honey Creek Friends' Meetinghouse	February 8, 1980 (#80001452)	Southwest of New Providence; 42°15′02″N 93°11′14″W	New Providence	
16	Illinois Central Combination Depot-Ackley	Illinois Central Combination Depot-Ackley	September 6, 1990 (#90001303)	North of Railroad St., between State and Mitchell Sts. 42°33′19″N 93°03′08″W	Ackley	
17	Iowa Falls Bridge	Iowa Falls Bridge	May 15, 1998 (#98000516)	U.S. Route 65 over the Iowa River; 42°31′06″N 93°15′46″W	Iowa Falls	Demolished in 2010.
18	Iowa Falls Union Depot	Iowa Falls Union Depot	September 6, 1990 (#90001305)	E. Rocksylvania Ave. and Depot St. 42°31′16″N 93°15′23″W	Iowa Falls	
19	Glenn and Nell Kurtz Lustron Home and Garage	Glenn and Nell Kurtz Lustron Home and Garage	December 2, 2014 (#14000971)	2017 Washington Ave. 42°31′11″N 93°16′58″W	Iowa Falls	
20	McClanahan Block	McClanahan Block	October 1, 1993 (#93000956)	613 Washington Ave. 42°31′10″N 93°15′53″W	Iowa Falls	
21	Metropolitan Opera House	Metropolitan Opera House	February 20, 1975 (#75000690)	515 Washington St. 42°30′55″N 93°16′08″W	Iowa Falls	
22	Mills Tower Historic District	Mills Tower Historic District	September 6, 1990 (#90001304)	E. Rocksylvania Ave., 1/3 mile east of Freight House; 42°31′22″N 93°14′55″W	Iowa Falls	
23	New Providence Building Association Stores	New Providence Building Association Stores	March 15, 2016 (#16000081)	401–405 W. Main Street Dr. 42°16′54″N 93°10′19″W	New Providence	
24	New Providence School Gymnasium	New Providence School Gymnasium	October 22, 1996 (#96000698)	106 N. Main St. 42°17′07″N 93°10′22″W	New Providence	
25	Princess-Sweet Shop	Princess-Sweet Shop	October 1, 1993 (#93000957)	607 Washington Ave. 42°31′10″N 93°15′52″W	Iowa Falls	
26	River Street Bridge	River Street Bridge	May 15, 1998 (#98000526)	River St. over the Iowa River; 42°31′11″N 93°16′05″W	Iowa Falls	
27	St. Matthew's by the Bridge Episcopal Church	St. Matthew's by the Bridge Episcopal Church	October 1, 1993 (#93000961)	Junction of Oak and Railroad Sts. 42°31′06″N 93°15′47″W	Iowa Falls	
28	Sentinel Block	Sentinel Block	October 1, 1993 (#93000962)	702 Washington Ave. 42°31′12″N 93°15′56″W	Iowa Falls	
29	Slayton Farms-Round Barn	Slayton Farms-Round Barn	July 7, 1999 (#99000739)	20478 135th St. 42°30′52″N 93°17′26″W	Iowa Falls	
30	Steamboat Rock Consolidated Schools Building	Steamboat Rock Consolidated Schools Building	March 31, 2004 (#04000243)	306 W. Market St. 42°24′29″N 93°03′55″W	Steamboat Rock	
31	Union Cemetery Gardener's Cottage	Union Cemetery Gardener's Cottage	January 24, 2002 (#01001486)	Union Cemetery; 42°31′40″N 93°16′13″W	Iowa Falls	
32	US Post Office-Iowa Falls	US Post Office-Iowa Falls	January 5, 1994 (#93000955)	401 Main St. 42°31′15″N 93°15′56″W	Iowa Falls	
33	W.R.C. Hall	W.R.C. Hall	October 1, 1993 (#93000963)	710 Washington Ave. 42°31′11″N 93°15′57″W	Iowa Falls	
34	Washington Avenue Bridge	Washington Avenue Bridge	May 15, 1998 (#98000518)	U.S. Route 20 over the Iowa River; 42°31′11″N 93°16′16″W	Iowa Falls	
35	Washington Avenue Commercial Historic District	Washington Avenue Commercial Historic District	October 31, 2012 (#12000889)	401-714 Washington Ave., the 300 block of Stephens St. and the 200 and 300 blocks of Oak St. 42°31′11″N 93°15′51″W	Iowa Falls	

== See also ==
- List of National Historic Landmarks in Iowa
- National Register of Historic Places listings in Iowa
- Listings in neighboring counties: Butler, Franklin, Grundy, Hamilton, Marshall, Story
