= Ripple (steamboat) =

The Ripple is a steamboat that transported people and items. It landed in Iowa City on June 20, 1841.

== Iowa City landing ==
The steamboat was the first one to sail to Iowa City at its ferry landing on the Iowa River. The residents of Iowa City, in the then Iowa Territory, were shocked when the steamboat arrived on June 20, 1841 because such a thing was unexpected. Their local newspaper, the Iowa City Standard, said in an editorial, "We this week announce an event which in our judgment, is of more importance than any other that has happened since our city had its existence". The ferry landing was then known as the Steam Boat landing. The arrival of the Ripple made it so that Iowa City was not dependent on the other towns, which were located on the Mississippi River, for their imports. The next morning, the citizens had a meeting at a hotel and invited steamboat captain D. Jones, his crew, and his passengers to a dinner that was given in their honor. An Iowa City local, Captain Frederick M. Irish was chosen to board the Ripple to help scout out any obstructions in the river and to figure out how to remove those obstructions.

The Ripple never returned to Iowa City. However, the steamboat Rock River traveled to Iowa City twice in 1842. Rock River was piloted by Captain Theyer and first arrived at Iowa City on April 21, 1842.
