= Mills Tower =

Mills Tower may refer to:

- Mills Tower (San Francisco)
- Mills Tower, building in the Mills Tower Historic District, Iowa Falls, Iowa
