= Iowa Falls Union Depot =

- U.S. National Register of Historic Places
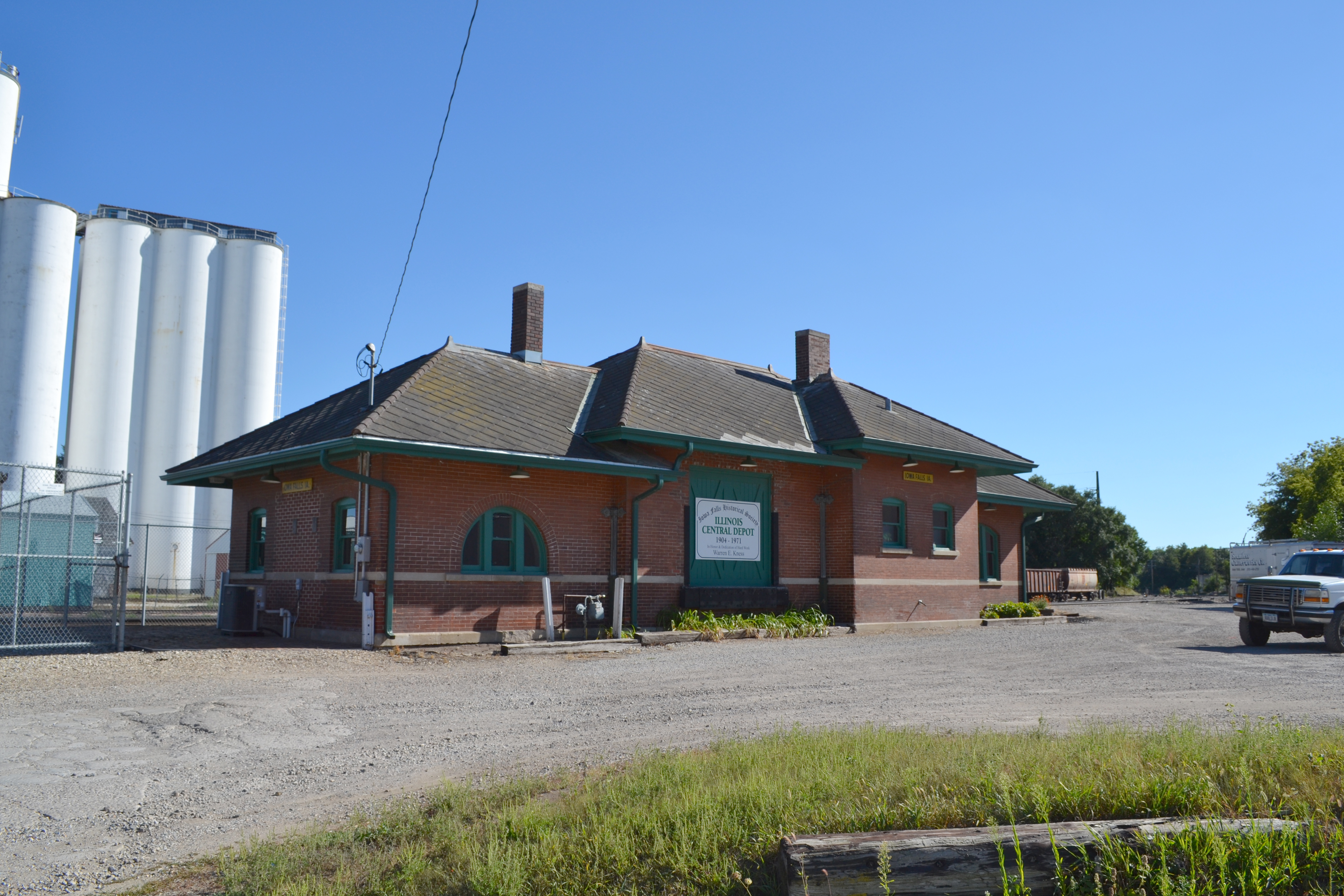

- Location within Iowa Location within the United States
- Location: E. Rocksylvania Ave. and Depot St., Iowa Falls, Iowa
- Coordinates: 42°31′16.4″N 93°15′23.4″W
- Area: less than one acre
- Built: 1902
- Architect: Illinois Central Railroad
- Architectural style: Renaissance Revival; Late 19th and 20th Century Revivals
- MPS: Advent & Development of Railroads in Iowa MPS
- NRHP reference No.: 90001305
- Added to NRHP: September 6, 1990

Iowa Falls Union Depot is a historic building located in Iowa Falls, Iowa, United States. The Dubuque & Sioux City Railroad, an affiliate of the Illinois Central Railroad (IC), laid the first rail track to Iowa Falls in 1866. The following year the Iowa Falls & Sioux City Railroad, another IC affiliate, continued construction of the line to the west, and it reached Sioux City by 1870. They built a plain, two-story frame depot to serve Iowa Falls. The Burlington, Cedar Rapids and Northern Railway (BCR&N) by way of its affiliate the Cedar Rapids, Iowa Falls & North Western, entered Iowa Falls in 1880. They built their own depot. It was basically another east–west route, but local business leaders desired a north–south route to serve the community.

Iowa Falls businessman E.S. Ellsworth founded the Des Moines, Iowa Falls & Northern Railroad (DMIF&N) in 1899 with the intention of connecting Iowa Falls to Des Moines. They utilized the IC facilities in Iowa Falls for their local services. The IC decided to upgrade its facilities in 1902. The new depot was typical of the second generation IC depots in Iowa. It featured their standard floor plan, brick walls, a hipped roof, and simple interior finishings. It served as a union depot until 1908 when the DMIF&N was acquired by the St. Paul & Des Moines Railroad, a subsidiary of the Chicago, Rock Island and Pacific Railroad. They built their own bridge across the Iowa River, and their own frame depot southeast of the union depot in 1909. The union depot continued to serve the Illinois Central until it discontinued passenger service in Iowa Falls. It was listed on the National Register of Historic Places in 1990.

| Preceding station | Illinois Central Railroad | Following station |
|---|---|---|
| Alden toward Sioux City | Sioux City – Chicago | Rathon toward Chicago |
