= Carnegie-Ellsworth Public Library =

- U.S. National Register of Historic Places
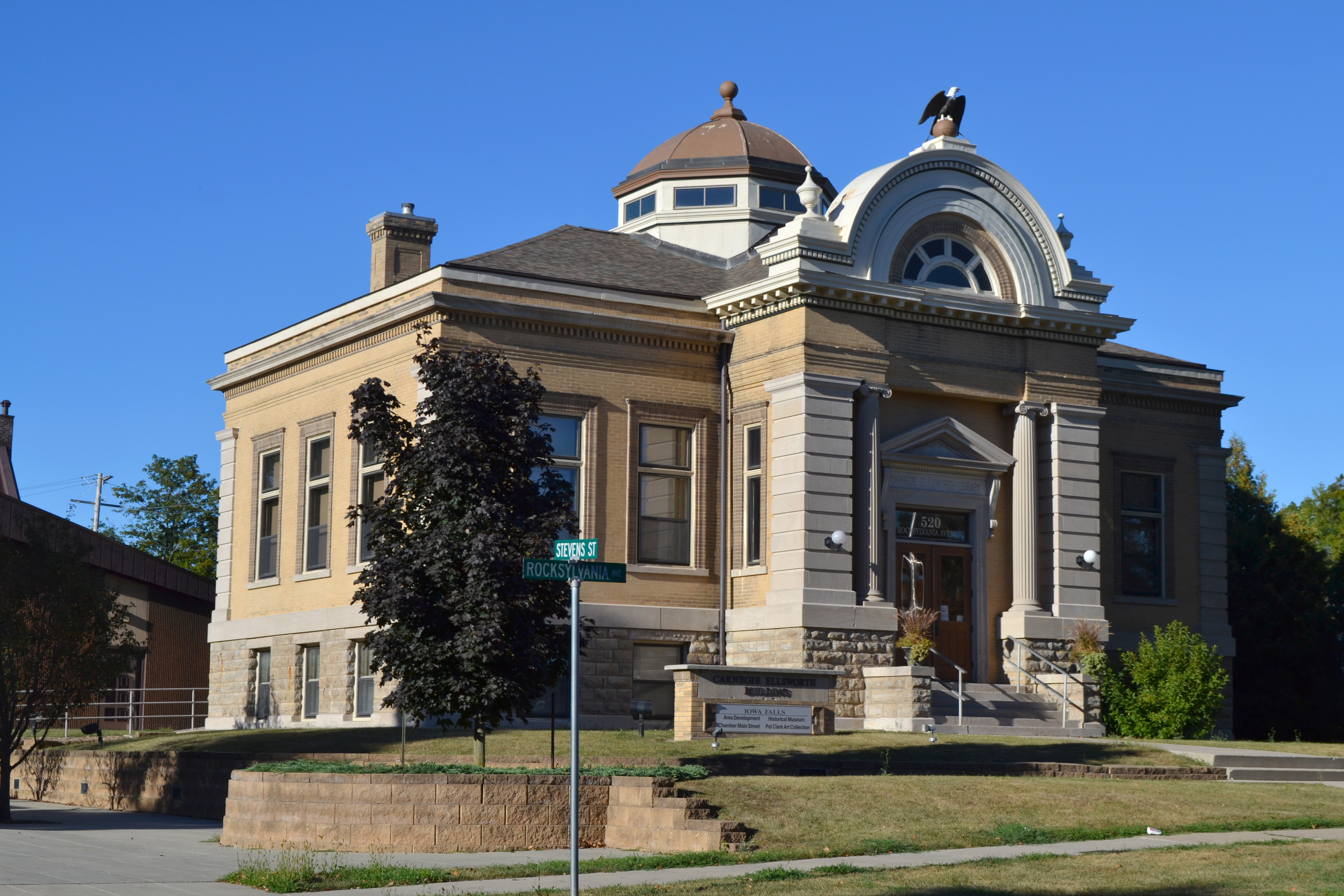

- Location within Iowa Location within the United States
- Location: 520 Rocksylvania Ave. Iowa Falls, Iowa
- Coordinates: 42°31′18.2″N 93°15′49.8″W
- Area: less than one acre
- Built: 1905
- MPS: Public Library Buildings in Iowa TR
- NRHP reference No.: 83000363
- Added to NRHP: May 23, 1983

The Carnegie-Ellsworth Public Library is a historic building located in Iowa Falls, Iowa, United States. Local businessman Eugene Ellsworth donated the property for the library in 1902. The following year the Carnegie Foundation agreed to grant the community $10,000 to build the building. It was dedicated on August 9, 1904. The single-story, brick structure is dominated by an elaborate entrance pavilion. It features a semi-circular window above the cornice, which is supported by two Ionic pillars in antis between rusticated corner piers. The hip roof is capped by a cupola. The building was listed on the National Register of Historic Places in 1983. The Robert W. Barlow Memorial Library, Iowa Falls' public library, is now housed in a modern building near the Iowa River.
