= Swisher Creek =

Stream in Iowa, U.S.

Coordinates: 41°48′21″N 91°39′48″W

Swisher Creek is a stream in the U.S. county of Johnson County, Iowa. It is a tributary to the Iowa River.

Swisher Creek was named after Benjamin Swisher, a 19th-century pioneer settler.
