= Glenn and Nell Kurtz Lustron Home and Garage =

Historic house in Iowa, United States

- U.S. National Register of Historic Places
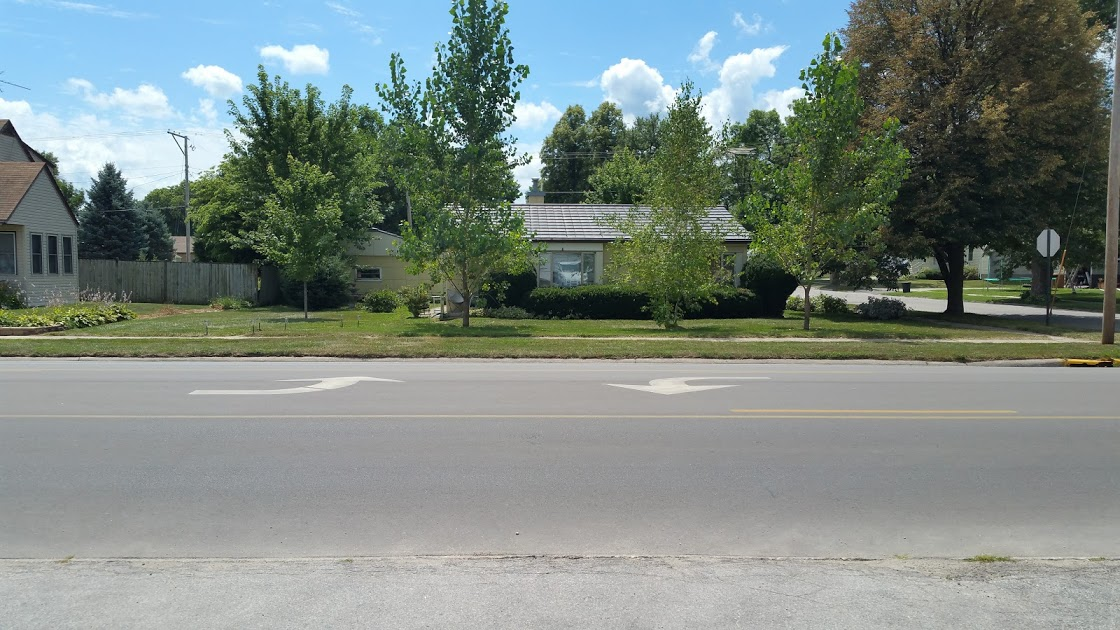

- Location within Iowa Location within the United States
- Location: 2017 Washington Ave. Iowa Falls, Iowa
- Coordinates: 42°31′10″N 93°16′58.3″W
- Area: less than one acre
- Built: 1949
- Architect: Lustron Corporation
- Architectural style: Lustron House
- NRHP reference No.: 14000971
- Added to NRHP: December 2, 2014

The Glenn and Nell Kurtz Lustron Home and Garage, also known as the Westchester 02 Deluxe model and #01237, is a historic building located in Iowa Falls, Iowa, United States. Glenn Kurtz owned and operated the Cigar and News Store downtown, and became the Lustron dealer for Hardin, Hamilton, Franklin, and Grundy counties. He and his wife Nell bought this property in the Washington Heights Addition in 1944, and they had their own prefabricated Lustron house and detached garage assembled on it five years later. The single-story, two bedroom house features its original light yellow porcelain steel wall panels, brown steel shingled roof, off-white gables and trim, metal entrance doors, and windows. The matching 1½-car garage sits behind the house, and is approached by a driveway off of Michigan Avenue. The house and garage were listed together on the National Register of Historic Places in 2014. There are four other Lustron houses in addition to this one that are associated with Kurtz's representation of the company in his four county area.
