= McClanahan Block =

- U.S. National Register of Historic Places
- U.S. Historic district – Contributing property
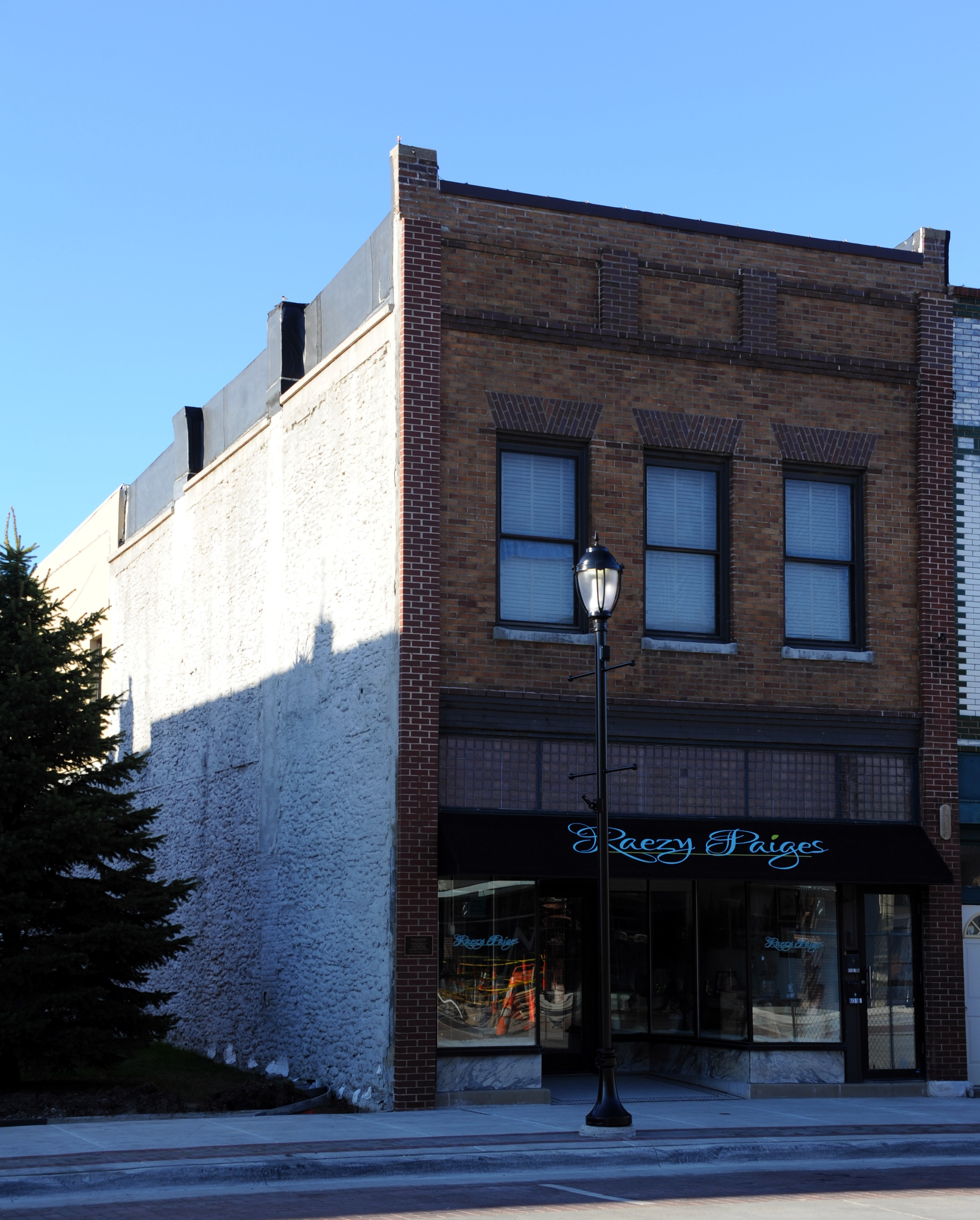

- Location within Iowa Location within the United States
- Location: 613 Washington Ave. Iowa Falls, Iowa
- Coordinates: 42°31′09.8″N 93°15′53.3″W
- Area: less than one acre
- Built: 1913
- Architectural style: Late 19th and Early 20th Century American Movements
- Part of: Washington Avenue Commercial Historic District (ID12000889)
- MPS: Iowa Falls MPS
- NRHP reference No.: 93000956
- Added to NRHP: October 1, 1993

The McClanahan Block is a historic building located in Iowa Falls, Iowa, United States. The city experienced a devastating fire in 1874, and most of the buildings on this block were built after the fire giving them a commonality of design. This two-story commercial building, completed in 1913, stands out given its polychrome brick and the simplicity of its design. Its decorative elements are found in the patterns created on its surface utilizing the bricks. At the time this building was constructed, Washington Avenue was paved and cement sidewalks replaced their wooden predecessors.

The building was individually listed on the National Register of Historic Places in 1993. It was included as a contributing property in the Washington Avenue Commercial Historic District in 2012.
