= Princess Sweet Shop (Iowa Falls, Iowa) =

- Princess--Sweet Shop
- U.S. National Register of Historic Places
- U.S. Historic district – Contributing property
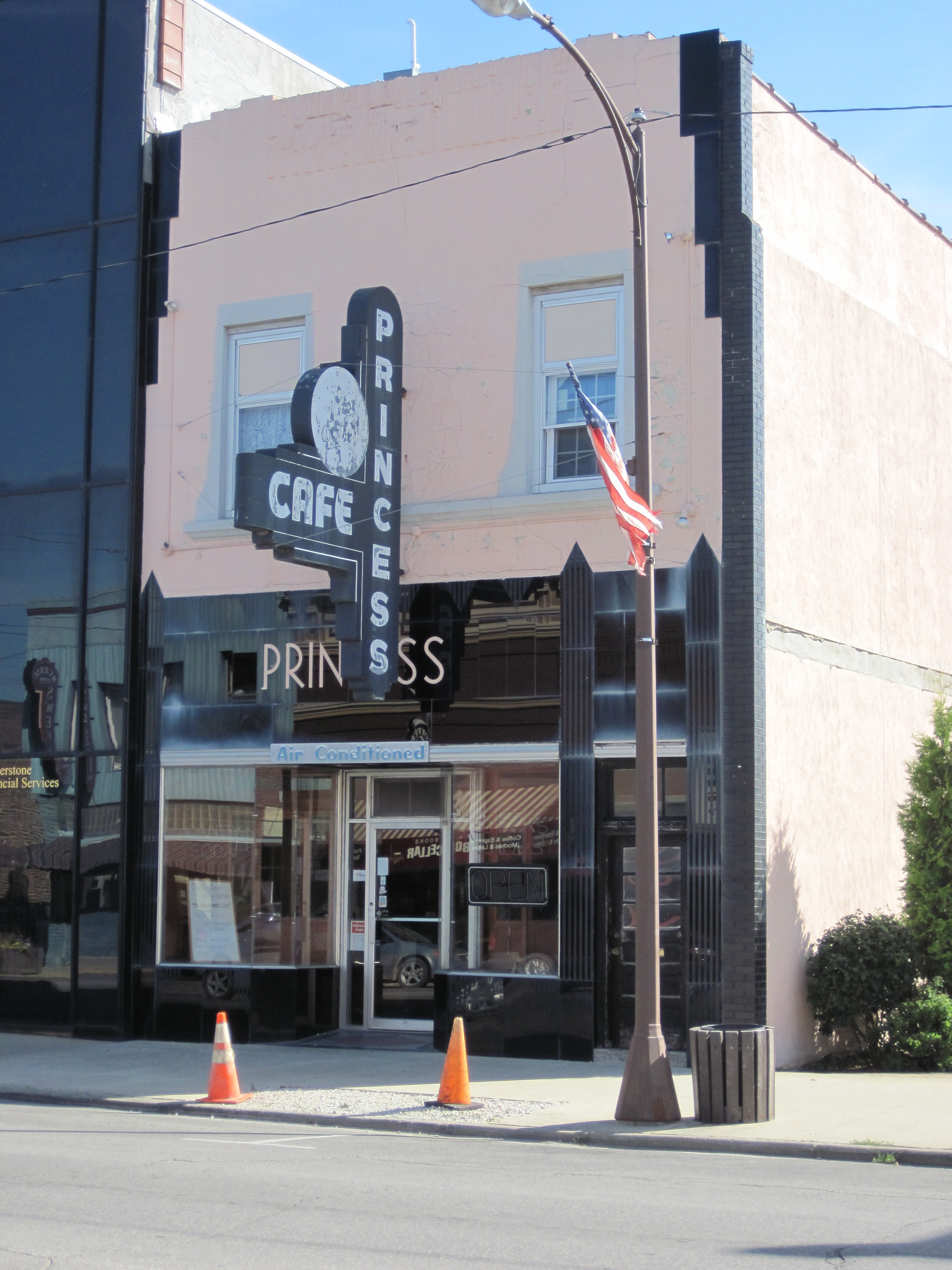

- Location within Iowa Location within the United States
- Location: 607 Washington Ave. Iowa Falls, Iowa
- Coordinates: 42°31′10″N 93°15′52″W
- Area: less than one acre
- Built: 1935
- Architect: Klippel, L.L.; Sprague, J.J.
- Architectural style: Art Deco
- Part of: Washington Avenue Commercial Historic District (ID12000889)
- MPS: Iowa Falls MPS
- NRHP reference No.: 93000957
- Added to NRHP: October 1, 1993

The Princess Sweet Shop is a historic building located in Iowa Falls, Iowa, United States. It is noted as "an outstanding example of Art Deco design from 1935. The Carrara Glass façade, and streamlined woodwork are typical of Art Deco design of the 1920s and 1930s, but a rarity in a small town in Iowa." Ernie Karrys (Karamitsanis) and Nicholas P. Pergakis opened the Princess in 1915. Two years later, The Sweet Shop was opened by Harry Pergakis. These three men were born in the town of Asprokampos, Greece. It was common for Greek immigrants to establish candy shops around the U.S. They combined their operations at the Princess location in 1928. Nicholas, a relative of N. Pergakis, died of cancer in September 1928 at age 39. The original building was destroyed in a fire on December 25, 1934. Local architect L.L. Klippel designed the new building, which was completed in 1935. It was the first building in Iowa Falls that was air conditioned.

The building was individually listed on the National Register of Historic Places in 1993. It was included as a contributing property in the Washington Avenue Commercial Historic District in 2012.
