= St. Matthew's by the Bridge Episcopal Church =

Historic place in Iowa, United States

- St. Matthew’s by the Bridge Episcopal Church
- U.S. National Register of Historic Places
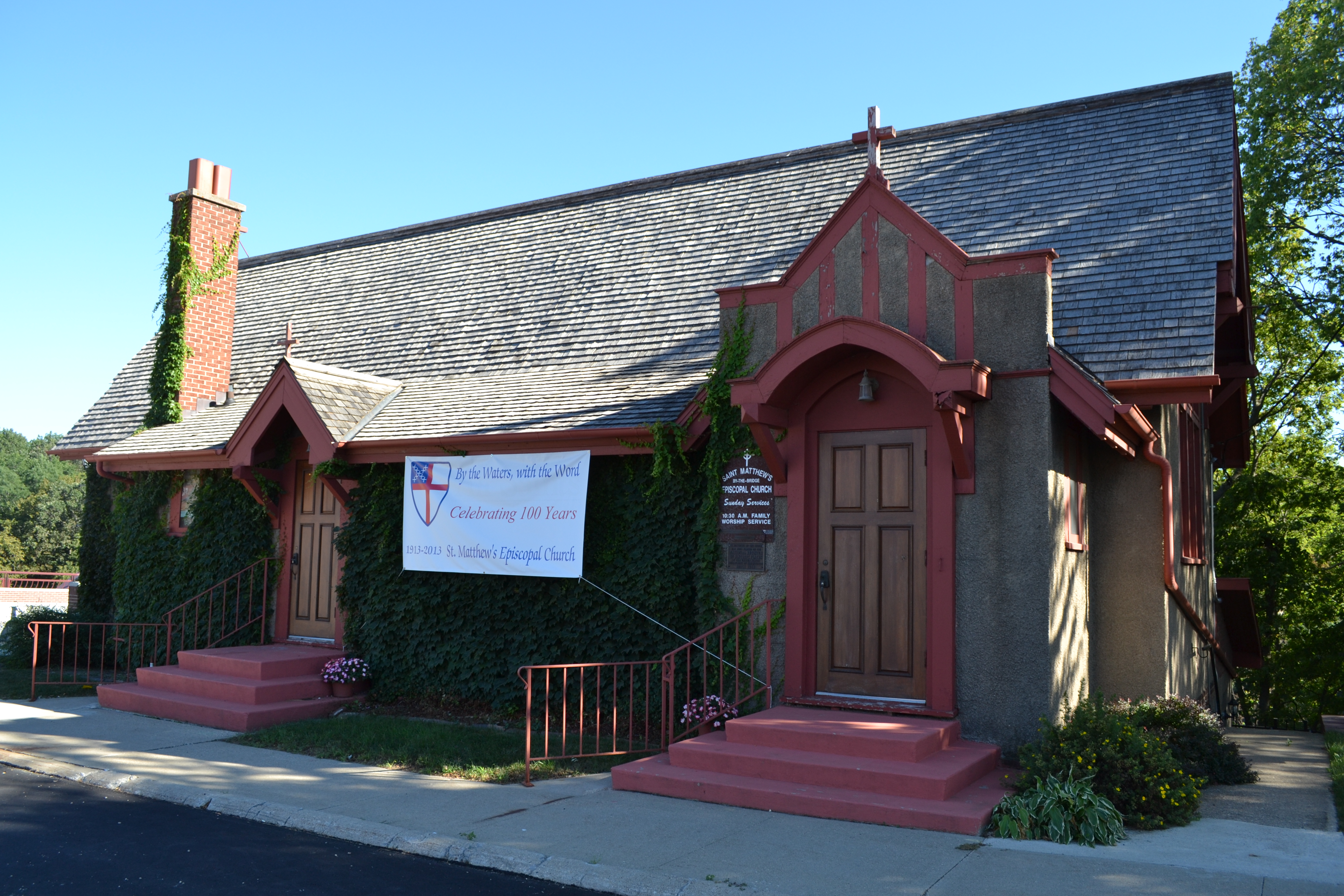

- Location within Iowa Location within the United States
- Location: Junction of Oak and Railroad Streets, Iowa Falls, Iowa
- Coordinates: 42°31′6″N 93°15′47″W
- Area: less than one acre
- Built: 1913
- Architect: Robert Layton
- Architectural style: Tudor Revival
- MPS: Iowa Falls MPS
- NRHP reference No.: 93000961
- Added to NRHP: October 1, 1993

St. Matthew's by the Bridge Episcopal Church is a parish church in the Episcopal Diocese of Iowa. The church is located in Iowa Falls, Iowa, United States. The parish was established in 1886, and the church building was listed on the National Register of Historic Places in 1993.

== Architecture ==
The church was designed by Robert Layton who was an industrial arts teacher in Iowa Falls. He was born in England and when he visited his home country in 1912 he made sketches of several village churches. From these sketches he drew up the plans for St. Matthew's. Louis and Ernie Welden, two of his students, assisted with making the blueprints.

The building is located along the Iowa River. Because of its rather precarious location, parishioners often refer to the church as St. Matthew's on the Brink. It is a wood-frame structure that is rectangular in shape and measures 60 by 24 feet (18.3 by 7.3 m). The exterior is covered with stucco and the gable ends give a simple simulated half-timbered effect. An addition with a shed roof was added onto the rear of the church in the 1960s to provide space for the vicar's study, classrooms, and storage.

The interior remains basically unchanged since it was first built. The altar is along the east wall of the sanctuary. The aisle is to the left of center, with the pews along the north wall. The structural system on the inside consists of King posts, Queen posts, collar beams and struts which enhance the vertical character of the space. The stained glass window over the altar depicts the Ascension of Jesus and was added in 1965. Four other windows depicting Apostles were added between 1980 and 1987. The building is significant for its simple design in the Tudor Revival mode.
