= Iowa Select Farms =

Coordinates: 42.50489°N 93.26319°W

Iowa Select Farms is a pork production operation headquartered in Iowa Falls, the largest in Iowa, and the fourth largest in the United States. It grew in the 1970s, was officially founded in 1992 and as of 2023 produced more than 5 million pigs on 800 CAFOs in 50 Iowa counties.

== History ==
Iowa Select Farms was founded by Jeff Hansen, son of a farmer, with his wife Deb Hansen. Starting in Jeff Hansen's father's barn in Iowa Falls, Hardin County in the 1970s, the Hansens hog operation grew, after which they founded Modern Hog Concepts, supplying equipment to other hog farms. By the early 1990s, Modern Hog Concepts had gross income of about 90 million dollars.

In 1992, the Hansens returned to running their own operation, incorporating as Iowa Select Farms, starting with 10,000 sows, enlarging to 62,000 by 1996, to 96,000 sows by 1999 and to 242,500 by 2021.

In 2021, Iowa Select Farms which remains privately owned by the Hansens employed about 1,200 people and raised more than 5 million pigs on 800 CAFOs in 50 Iowa counties. Select Farms remains headquartered in Iowa Falls.

As of 2021, the Hansens no longer live on the farm but in a 7,000-square-foot mansion inside a gated community in suburban Des Moines or in one of their multiple homes on the Florida coast.

== Operational issues ==
Toward the end of the 20th century, hog farming evolved from mostly small multi-use farms to large industrial style operations. Select Farms is one of many of these, and this hog-production method has occasioned criticism on account of the environmental impact of pig farming including air and water pollution, smell, visual blight, animal cruelty, social decay, and other issues.

Select Farms had taken some steps to ameliorate some of these nuisances to a degree, including planting tree barriers to reduce wind and thus diffusion of odor carrying dust and installing electrostatic fencing which also slows dust diffusion. Select Farms feeds phytase to its hogs, which reduces pollution-causing phosphorus in the pig manure.

In 2020, during the supply chain crisis, Select Farms' meat packing capability dropped, leading to oversupply of pigs. Select Farms leased additional processing space, cut down weight gain of pigs, and – like other hog producers – euthanized some hogs using VSD+ (ventilation shutdown plus), a controversial procedure whereby hogs are sealed off from air and thus suffocated; the plus indicates that high temperatures or extra carbon dioxide, or both, are also involved. Silence, the cessation of squealing, occurs after about an hour, after which about 99.7% of the pigs are dead.

== Political issues ==
Iowa's hog industry in general has successfully lobbied Iowa legislators to roll back regulations pertaining to CAFOs. In 1994, Iowa Select Farms donated $41,000 to then State Governor Terry Branstad’s campaign. In 1995, Branstad signed H.F 519 "to protect animal agricultural producers". Jeff Hansen is quoted as saying the bill was a fair compromise.

As of 2021, Hansen contributed $300,000 to Iowa Governor Kim Reynolds' campaign.

== Foundation ==
In 2006, the Hansens founded the Jeff and Deb Hansen Foundation. The Foundation states it "supports various efforts, including cancer research, food banks, and veterans programs".
