= Edgewood School of Domestic Arts =

- U.S. National Register of Historic Places
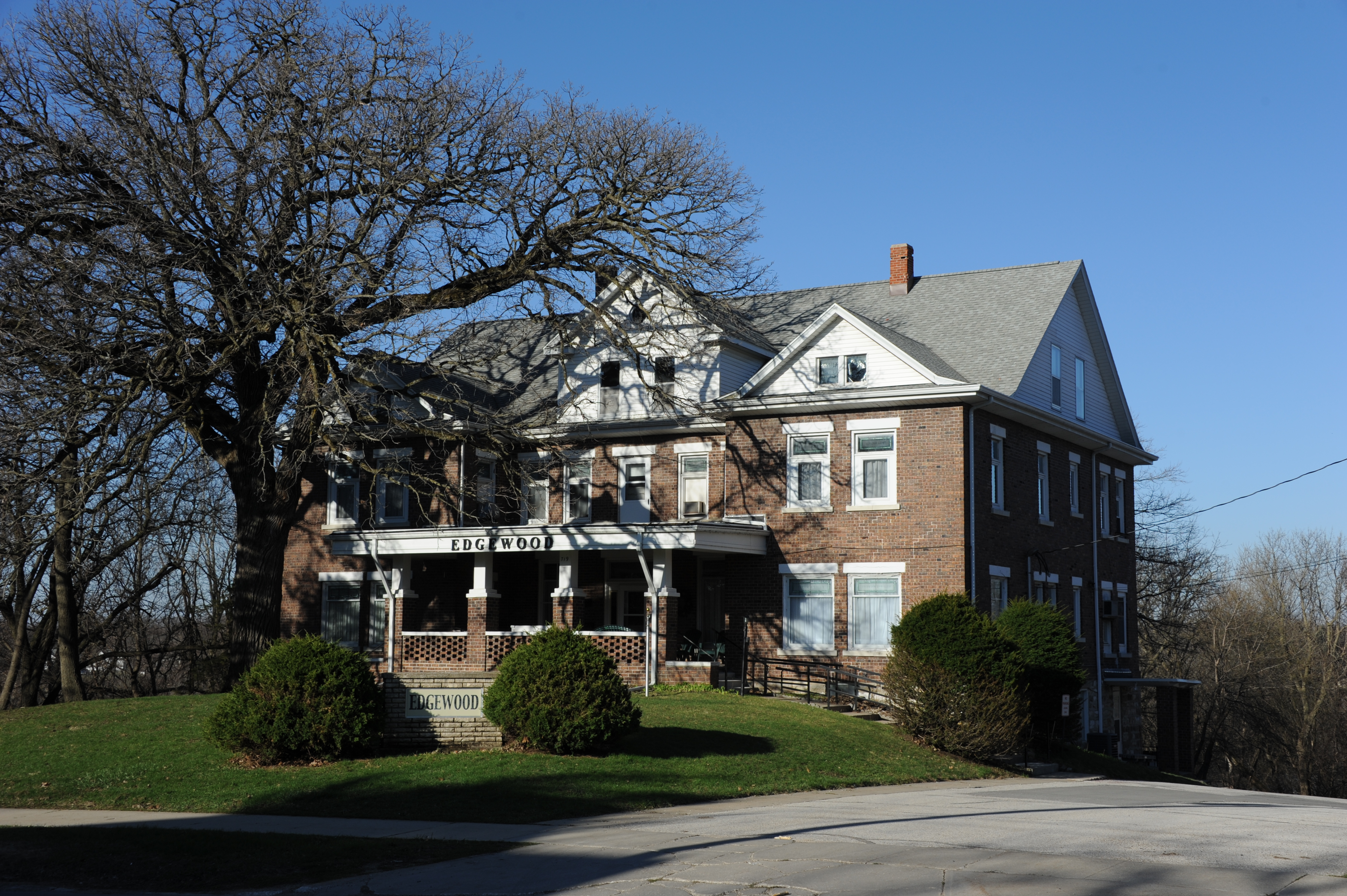

- Location within Iowa Location within the United States
- Location: 719 River St. Iowa Falls, Iowa
- Coordinates: 42°31′25.9″N 93°16′06″W
- Area: 1.5 acres (0.61 ha)
- Built: 1909-1910
- NRHP reference No.: 79000897
- Added to NRHP: April 19, 1979

The Edgewood School of Domestic Arts, now known just as "Edgewood," is a historic building in Iowa Falls, Iowa, United States. Originally a school for girls and women, it now houses apartments upstairs and space for meetings and family gatherings downstairs.

== History ==
=== School of Domestic Arts ===
Edgewood was established as a School of Domestic Arts in 1886 by Mrs. Eva Simplot. The 2½-story, frame structure built on a rock-faced stone foundation was completed in 1910. From 1911 - 1935 nine hundred thirty five women and girls from the area attended classes here. Subjects included sewing, cooking, and home management.

The lots on which Edgewood stands were owned by Mr. and Mrs. Simplot and were donated free of encumbrance. Through Mrs. Simplot's efforts and dedication and with the help of a group of local women, the school was built. Community support was evidenced by contributions of money, furnishings, and labor. Dinners, suppers, and ice cream socials were held. Magazine subscriptions were sold, bricks were sold at a cost of one cent each. Windows were purchased at a cost of $12.50—the donor's name was etched in the upper leaded glass pane.

After the school opened, expenses were met from tuition, board and room paid by the students and continuing donations from concerned people. Any deficit at the end of the month was paid by Mrs. Simplot from her own personal account.

In 1934, Domestic Science was added to the curriculum of the Iowa Falls schools, and it became evident that the "Sewing School" was no longer needed. Mrs. Simplot made plans for the future use of the building. She died in 1935. Her will left all the property now known as Edgewood to the women and girls of the Iowa Falls community, to be used for charitable, educational, and cultural activities. The building was transformed into a community center.

=== Community Center ===
Articles of Incorporation were drawn up and adopted in 1938. The articles were amended in 1961 and again in 1978. The articles provide that a board of directors be elected to care for and supervise the use of the building. These directors are elected at an annual meeting held in July of each year. Currently there are 12 members on the board

Through the years improvements have been made as funds became available. The second floor was turned into apartments, and bathrooms were installed. The building was rewired, and the kitchen was modernized. A parking lot, walks, and landscaping were made possible with the sale of some of the lots and the support of the city.

More recently, the attic was insulated, and the windows were replaced and reinforced. The original upper panes with donors' names were kept. The social hall and kitchen were air-conditioned, and window air conditioning units were put into each apartment.

Current income comes from the rental of the five apartments on the second floor and the public use of the social hall and kitchen at stated rates. The basement is leased free of rent to the Scouts of Iowa Falls. Upkeep and utilities of that area are paid by them.

As when Mrs. Simplot lived, income does not always meet expenses. Public support continues to be necessary. The Community Chest and interested citizens annually contribute money and labor. For ten years, the board members sponsored an annual ice cream social during the July 4th celebrations, with all profits going to Edgewood. The board appreciates all gifts and support as they work to keep the building and premises in a state of good repair and an asset to the community.

Edgewood was listed on the National Register of Historic Places in 1979.
