= Estes Park Band Shell =

- U.S. National Register of Historic Places
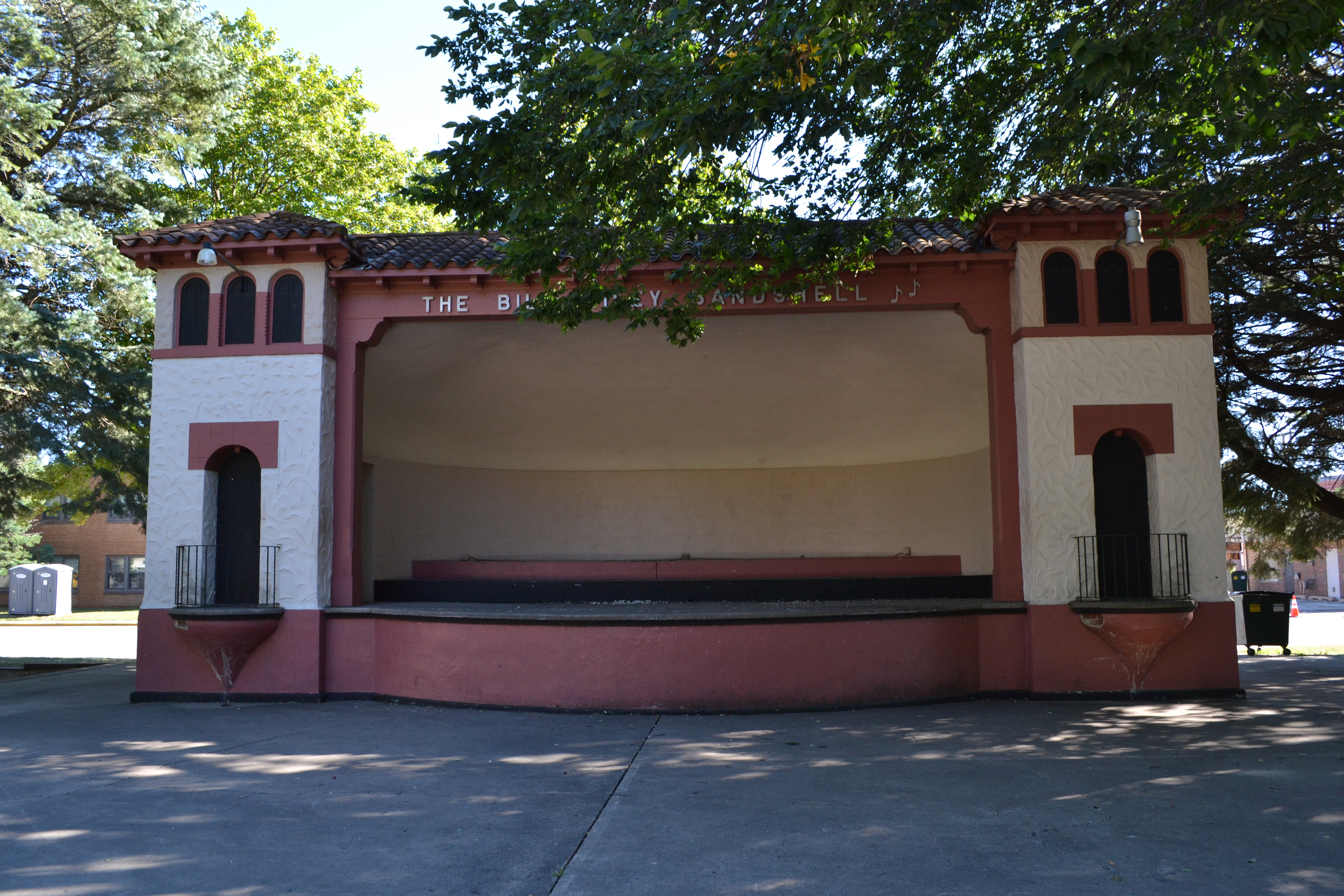

- Location within Iowa Location within the United States
- Location: Estes Park; Iowa Falls, Iowa
- Coordinates: 42°31′14.6″N 93°15′53.3″W
- Area: less than one acre
- Built: 1931
- Architect: L.L. Klippel
- Architectural style: Mission/Spanish Revival
- MPS: Iowa Falls MPS
- NRHP reference No.: 93000960
- Added to NRHP: October 1, 1993

Estes Park Band Shell is a historic building located in Iowa Falls, Iowa, United States. Planning and construction of the band shell were a community project that began in 1931. They engaged Iowa Falls native L.L. Klippel to design the structure, and N.F. Guernsey of Sioux City, Iowa to landscape Estes Park. Completed later in the year, the Mission/Spanish Revival structure features two bell towers with round arch balconies that flank the proscenium arch. There is a cement basement that houses rehearsal space. The walls are stucco, and the structure is capped with a tiled hip roof with bracketed eaves. Over the years the band shell has hosted concerts, dances, and a variety of entertainment activities. Labor unions and political parties have held rallies here. Wendell Willkie spoke here when he ran for president in 1940. The band shell was listed on the National Register of Historic Places in 1993.
