= Washington Avenue Commercial Historic District =

Historic district in Iowa, United States

- U.S. National Register of Historic Places
- U.S. Historic district
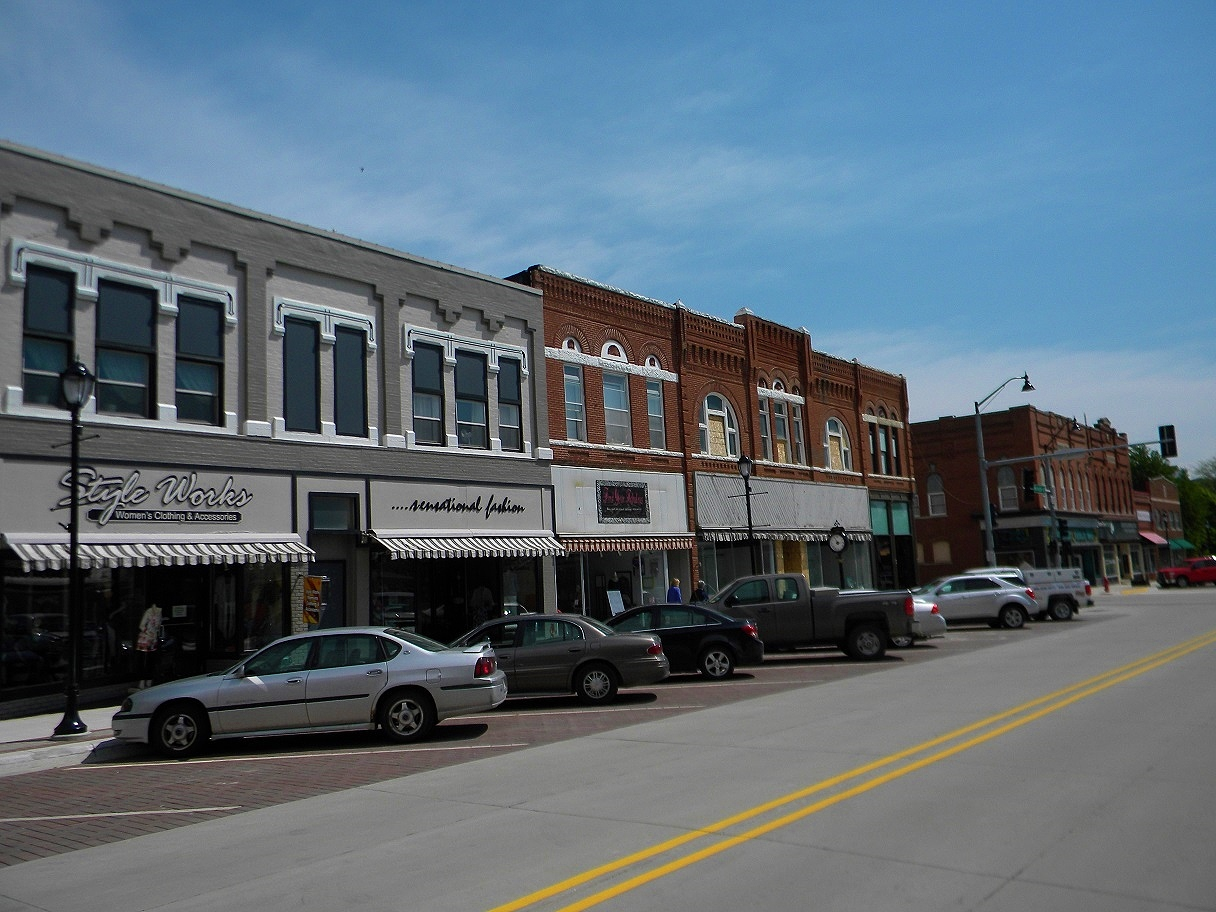

- Location within Iowa Location within the United States
- Location: 401-714 Washington Ave., the 300 block of Stephens St. and the 200 and 300 blocks of Oak St., Iowa Falls, Iowa
- Coordinates: 42°31′10.7″N 93°15′51″W
- Area: 11 acres (4.5 ha)
- Architectural style: Italianate; Classical Revival
- NRHP reference No.: 12000889
- Added to NRHP: October 31, 2012

The Washington Avenue Commercial Historic District is a nationally recognized historic district located in Iowa Falls, Iowa, United States. It was listed on the National Register of Historic Places in 2012. At the time of its nomination the district consisted of 59 resources, including 42 contributing buildings and 15 non-contributing buildings. The district takes in most of the city's central business district. The buildings here were generally used for retail and office purposes. An opera house and theater are also located here. Around the edges of the district are buildings that housed automobile dealerships. The buildings generally range from one to two stories, but a couple structures are three stories in height. Built between 1857 and 1960, the buildings are composed of masonry construction. The commercial Italianate and Classical Revival styles are dominant.

Seven buildings that were individually listed on the National Register of Historic Places are contributing properties in the district. They include: the W.R.C. Hall (1898), the Metropolitan Opera House (1899), the Ellsworth-Jones Building (1902), the Sentinel Block (1905), the McClanahan Block (1913), First National Bank (1918), and the Princess Sweet Shop (1935).
