= United States Post Office (Iowa Falls, Iowa) =

- US Post Office-Iowa Falls
- U.S. National Register of Historic Places
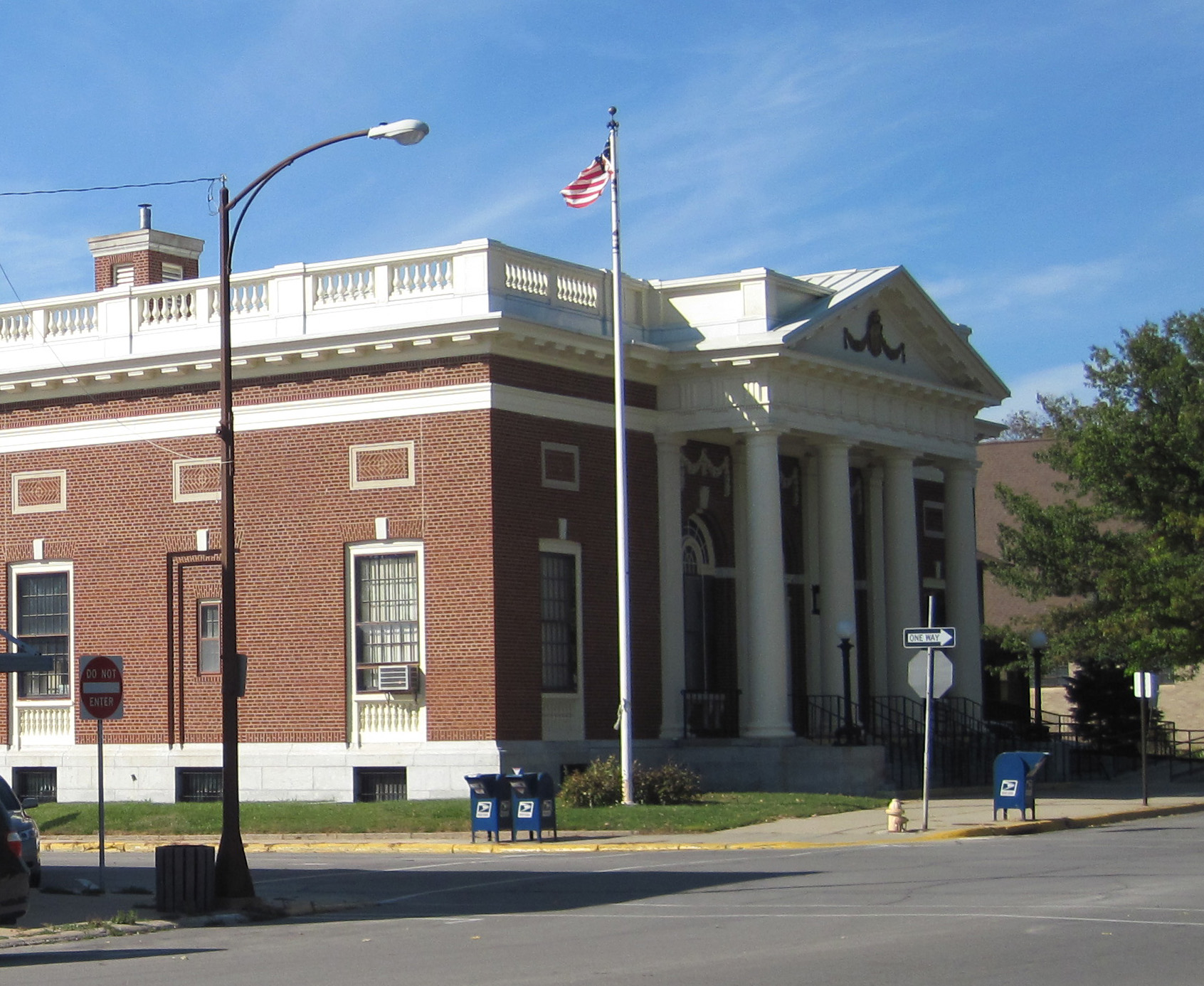

- Location within Iowa Location within the United States
- Location: 401 Main St. Iowa Falls, Iowa
- Coordinates: 42°31′15″N 93°15′56″W
- Built: 1914
- Architect: Oscar Wenderoth
- Architectural style: Classical Revival
- MPS: Iowa Falls MPS
- NRHP reference No.: 93000955
- Added to NRHP: January 5, 1994

The United States Post Office is a historic building located in downtown Iowa Falls, Iowa, United States. Built in 1914, the structure was designed in the Neoclassical style, with Oscar Wenderoth as the supervising architect. The 1893 Colombian Exposition in Chicago was a major influence in the building's design. The foundation is composed of North Carolina granite, while the walls are dark red brick that is laid in an English cross bond. The main entrance is framed by a portico that is held up by four columns of the Doric order. The interior features woodwork of white oak, a marble-terrazo floor, and a vaulted ceiling. It was listed on the National Register of Historic Places in 1994.

== See also ==
- List of United States post offices
