= W.R.C. Hall =

- U.S. National Register of Historic Places
- U.S. Historic district – Contributing property
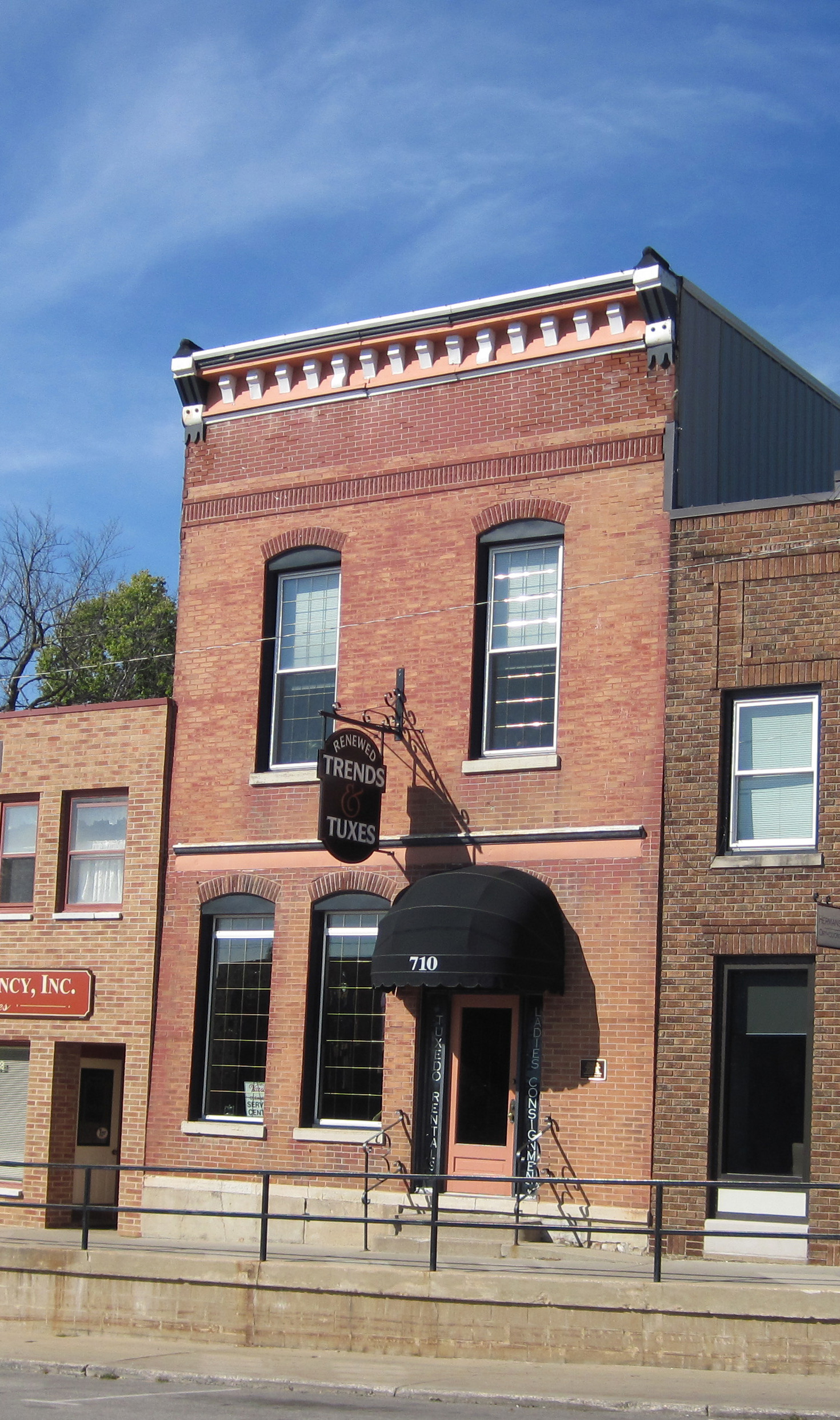

- Location within Iowa Location within the United States
- Location: 710 Washington Ave. Iowa Falls, Iowa
- Coordinates: 42°31′11″N 93°15′57″W
- Built: 1898
- Architectural style: Late Victorian
- Part of: Washington Avenue Commercial Historic District (ID12000889)
- MPS: Iowa Falls MPS
- NRHP reference No.: 93000963
- Added to NRHP: October 1, 1993

The W.R.C. Hall is a historic building located in Iowa Falls, Iowa, United States. Built in 1898, the building has segmented arched windows and a bracketed metal cornice, which are features of the Italianate style.

W.R.C. stands for the Woman's Relief Corps, which was created to serve the needs of American Civil War veterans, widows and orphans. The local group was organized as the Payne Post #48 in 1886. They organized such events as Easter programs, entertainment, oyster suppers, flower sales, and they cared for veteran's graves. As their numbers declined the W.R.C. deeded the building to the American Legion, who eventually deeded it to the city of Iowa Falls. They sold it to a local person and it has been used as a commercial building. It is now used as an apartment building.

The building was individually listed on the National Register of Historic Places in 1993. It was included as a contributing property in the Washington Avenue Commercial Historic District in 2012.
