= Union Cemetery Gardener's Cottage =

Historic site in Hardin County, Iowa, US

- U.S. National Register of Historic Places
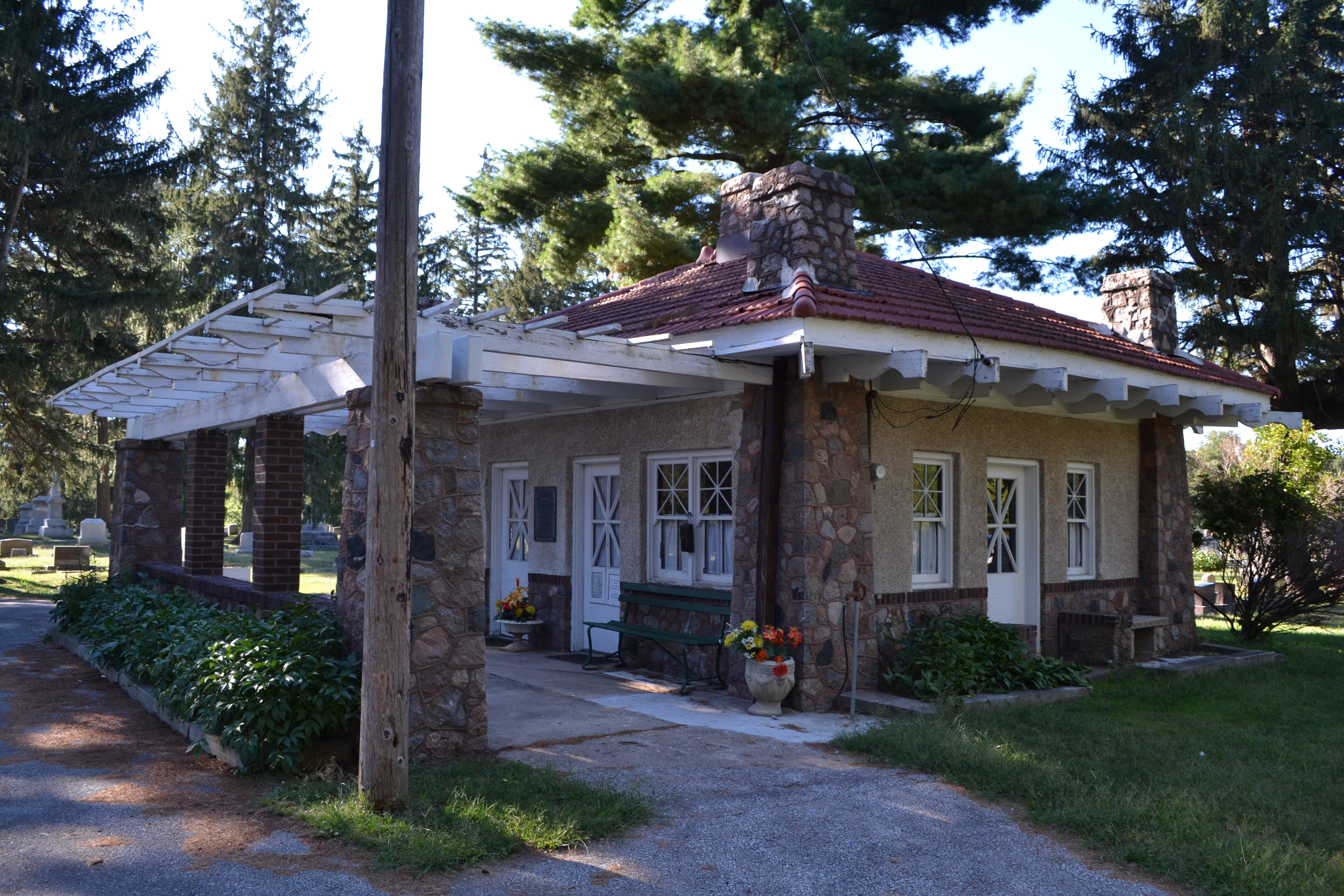

- Location within Iowa Location within the United States
- Location: Union Cemetery; Iowa Falls, Iowa
- Coordinates: 42°31′39.7″N 93°16′13″W
- Area: less than one acre
- Built: 1918
- Architect: W.L. Peddicord
- Architectural style: Bungalow/Craftsman
- MPS: Iowa Falls MPS
- NRHP reference No.: 01001486
- Added to NRHP: January 24, 2002

Union Cemetery Gardener's Cottage is a historic building located in Iowa Falls, Iowa, United States. When the town was platted in 1855 there was no provision for a cemetery. The women of the community formed the Social Gathering of Iowa Falls with the purpose of establishing a cemetery. They raised money and purchased the first 4.5 acres (1.8 ha) in 1860 from the three men who laid out Iowa Falls. By 1900 the organization minutes began referencing the need for a building for the sexton during stormy weather. It was not until 1918 that the Ladies Social Gathering authorized the construction of a building that they called a chapel and mortuary. The single-story American Craftsman cottage was designed by W. L. Peddicord. While it was used for a variety of functions, it appears that it was never used as a chapel. It has generally been used to house the sexton's tools, and it has been used as the cemetery office. The building was listed on the National Register of Historic Places in 2002.
