= Ellsworth–Jones Building =

- U.S. National Register of Historic Places
- U.S. Historic district – Contributing property
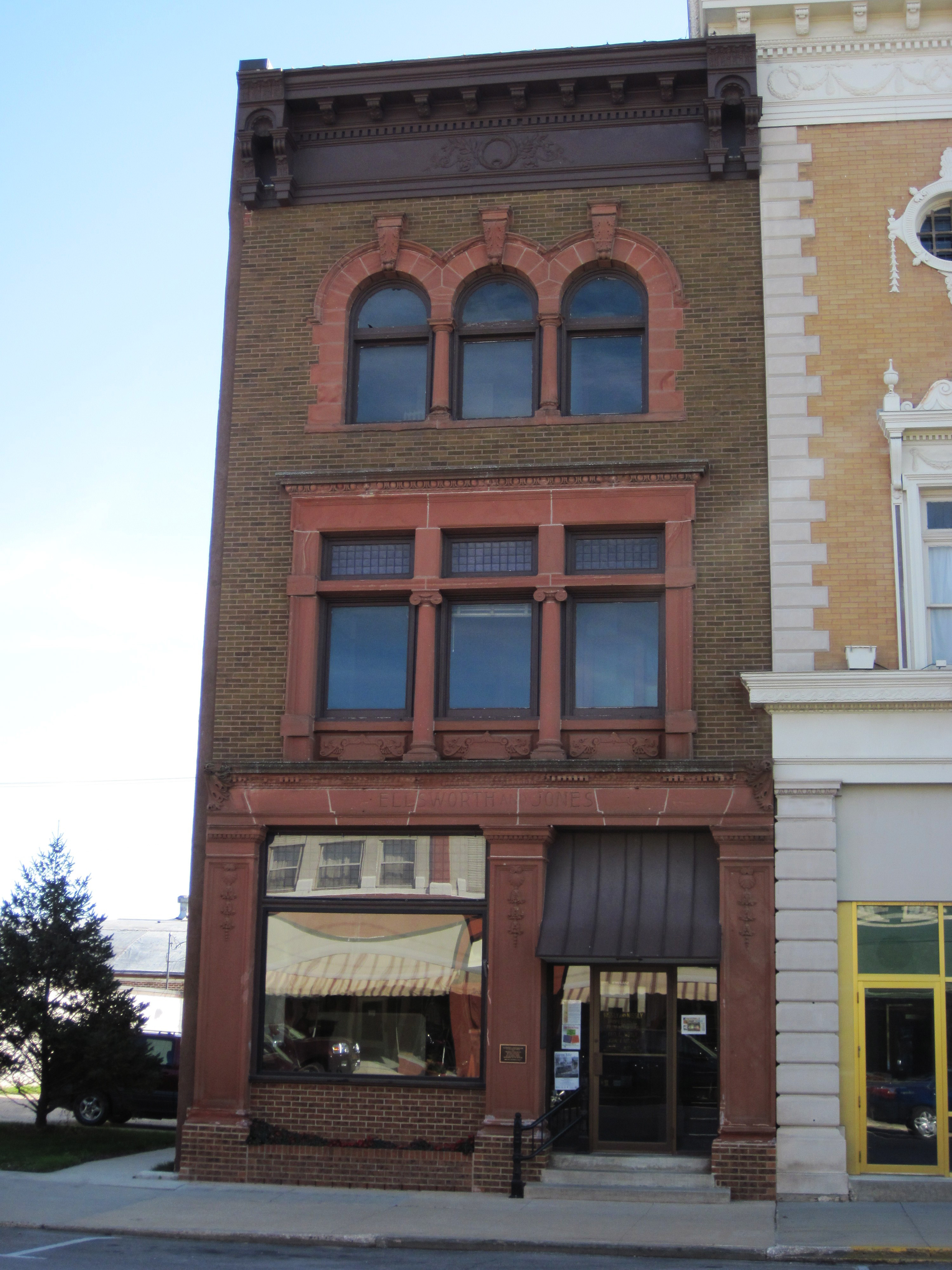

- Location within Iowa Location within the United States
- Location: 511 Washington Ave. Iowa Falls, Iowa
- Coordinates: 42°31′09.8″N 93°15′48.7″W
- Area: less than one acre
- Built: 1902
- Architectural style: Neoclassical
- Part of: Washington Avenue Commercial Historic District (ID12000889)
- MPS: Iowa Falls MPS
- NRHP reference No.: 93000959
- Added to NRHP: October 1, 1993

The Ellsworth–Jones Building is a historic building located in Iowa Falls, Iowa, United States. Eugene S. Ellsworth was a land broker, town developer, and philanthropist. This building was the headquarters of his firm Ellsworth and Jones, who sold land throughout Iowa and other states in the Midwest. While Iowa Falls was their headquarters, they also had offices in Chicago, Boston, and Crookston, Minnesota. The three-story, brick Neoclassical building was completed in 1902. It features Ionic and Doric columns, egg-and-dart motif on the lower level columns, round arches, acanthus leaf keystones, foliated decorative elements, a dentils on the cornice.

The building was individually listed on the National Register of Historic Places in 1993. It was included as a contributing property in the Washington Avenue Commercial Historic District in 2012.
