= Sentinel Block =

- U.S. National Register of Historic Places
- U.S. Historic district – Contributing property
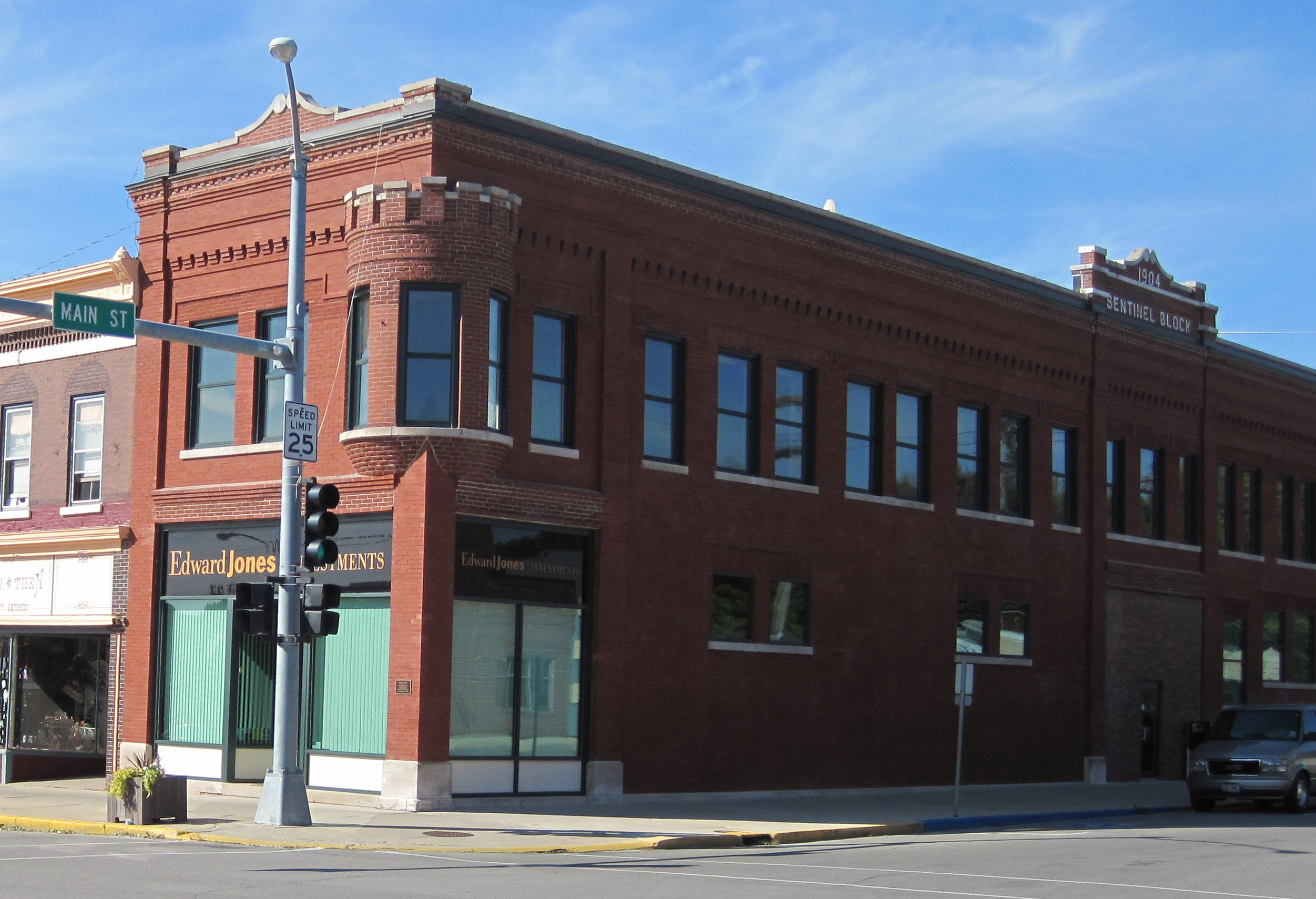

- Location within Iowa Location within the United States
- Location: 702 Washington Ave. Iowa Falls, Iowa
- Coordinates: 42°31′11.7″N 93°15′56.3″W
- Area: less than one acre
- Built: 1904-1905
- Architectural style: Late 19th and 20th Century Revivals
- Part of: Washington Avenue Commercial Historic District (ID12000889)
- MPS: Iowa Falls MPS
- NRHP reference No.: 93000962
- Added to NRHP: October 1, 1993

The Sentinel Block is a historic building located in Iowa Falls, Iowa, United States. Previous commercial blocks in Iowa Falls tended to follow the more ornate Italianate style. This building, completed in 1905, marks a departure from those older structures. Rectilinear brick panels above the windows replaced the decorative hoodmolds, and the brick patterned cornice with a plain stone cap replaced the heavy metal cornice. The building also features an oriel window with a crenelated parapet. The building housed the Iowa Falls Sentinel for over 20 years. It began as the Eldora Sentinel in 1857, relocated to Iowa Falls in 1865, and was bought out by its competitor, the Hardin County Citizen, in 1927.

The building was individually listed on the National Register of Historic Places in 1993. It was included as a contributing property in the Washington Avenue Commercial Historic District in 2012.
