= Slayton Farms-Round Barn =

- U.S. National Register of Historic Places
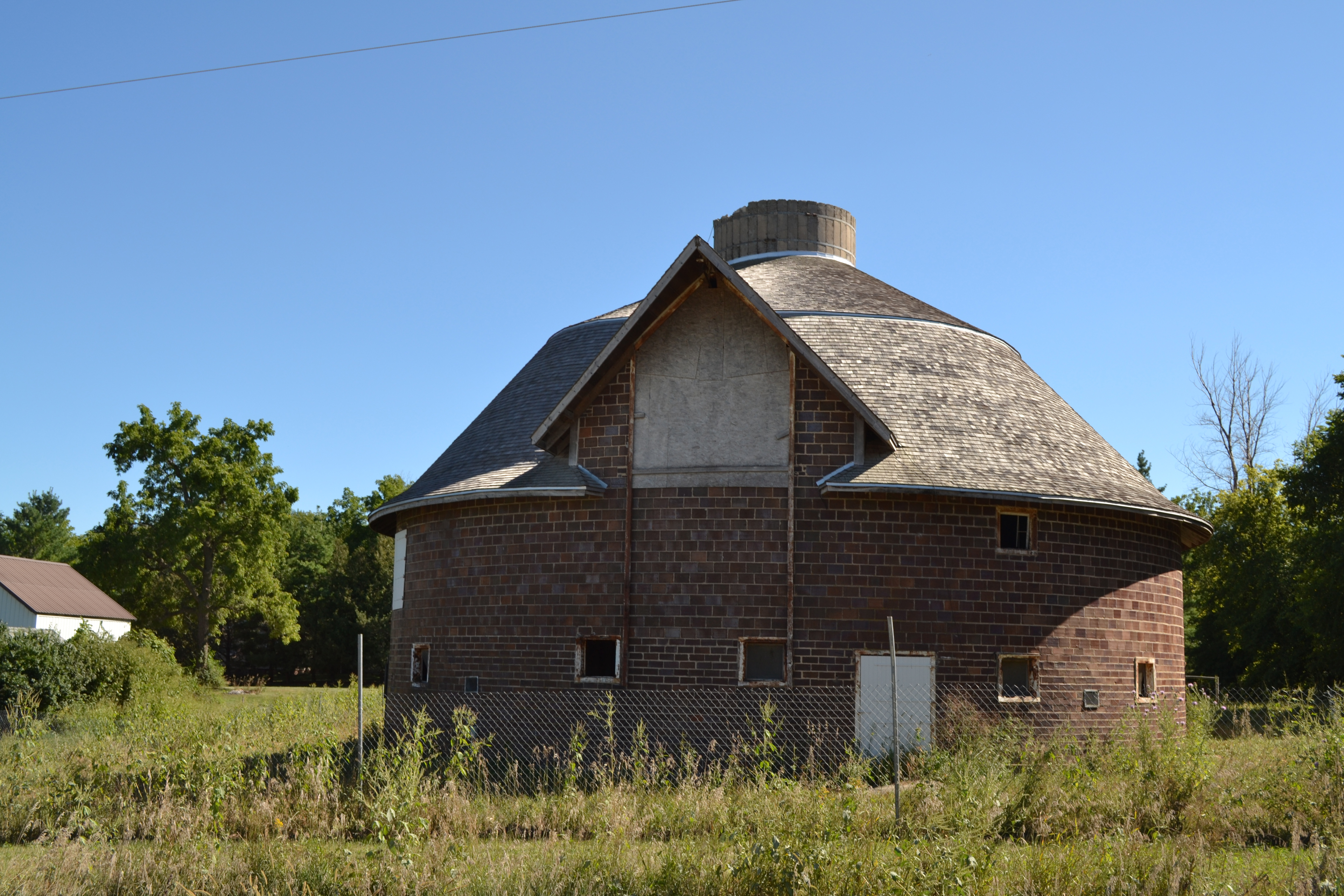

- Location within Iowa Location within the United States
- Location: 20478 135th St.
- Nearest city: Iowa Falls, Iowa
- Coordinates: 42°30′52″N 93°17′26″W
- Area: less than one acre
- Built: 1915
- MPS: Iowa Round Barns: The Sixty Year Experiment TR
- NRHP reference No.: 99000739
- Added to NRHP: July 7, 1999

The Slayton Farms-Round Barn is a historic building located near Iowa Falls in rural Hardin County, Iowa, United States. Frank Slayton had it built in 1915 for use as a dairy barn. The barn is one of 16 that was built by the Johnston Brothers Clay Works from Fort Dodge, Iowa. It is constructed of hollow clay tiles and features a gambrel roof with two different pitches and hay dormer. Two aerators flank the central silo on the roof. The interior of the barn is fashioned around the silo from which silage was shoveled to feed the cattle. An overhead track system and a bucket for hauling materials remains intact. It has been listed on the National Register of Historic Places since 1999. Purchased by Engel Family in 2023.
