= First National Bank (Iowa Falls, Iowa) =

- U.S. National Register of Historic Places
- U.S. Historic district – Contributing property
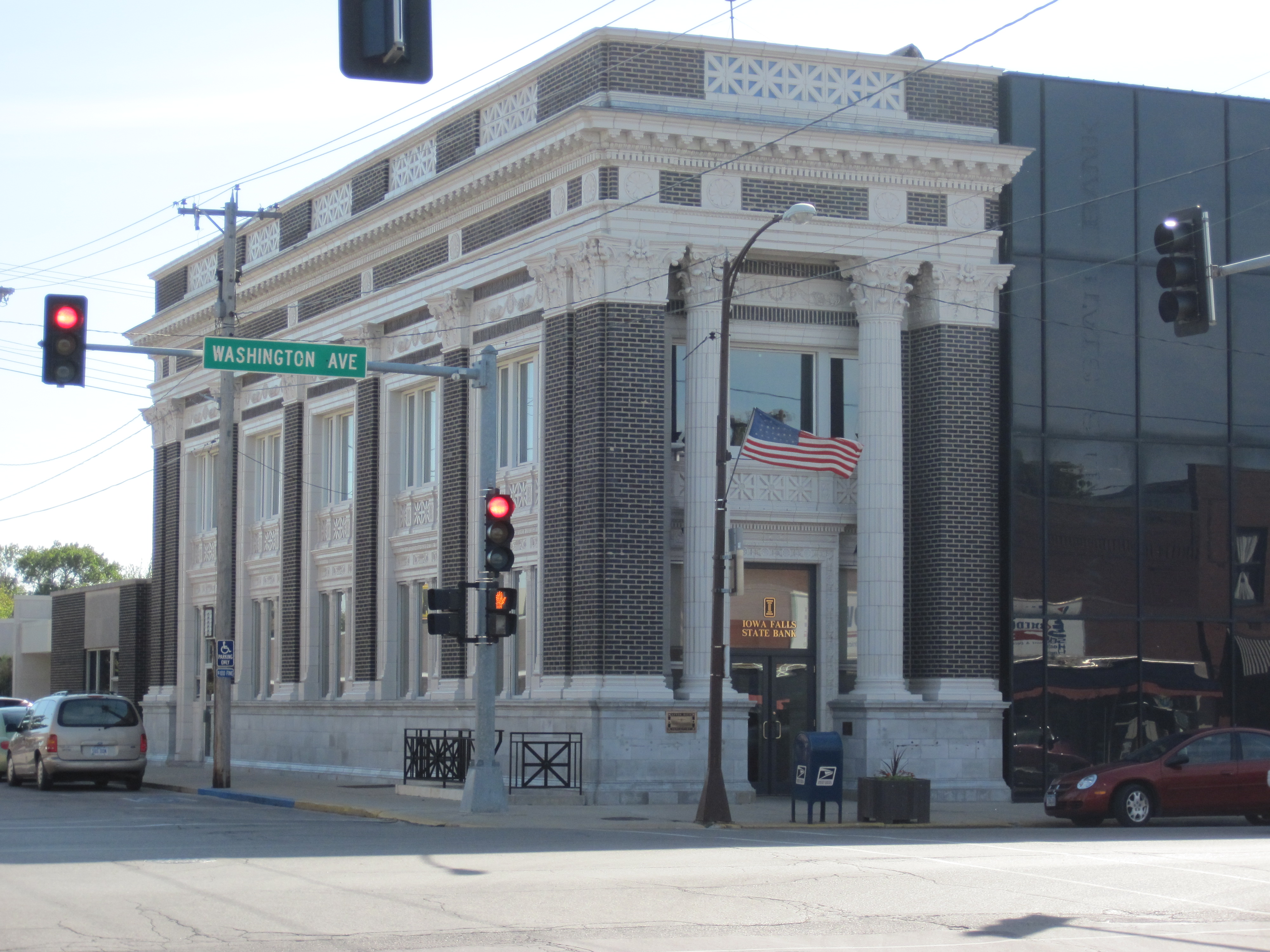

- Location within Iowa Location within the United States
- Location: 601 Washington Ave. Iowa Falls, Iowa
- Coordinates: 42°31′10″N 93°15′51.7″W
- Area: less than one acre
- Built: 1918
- Architect: Lytle Company
- Architectural style: Classical Revival
- Part of: Washington Avenue Commercial Historic District (ID12000889)
- MPS: Iowa Falls MPS
- NRHP reference No.: 93000958
- Added to NRHP: October 1, 1993

First National Bank is a historic building located in Iowa Falls, Iowa, United States. The bank traces its founding to 1882 when the Commercial Bank of Iowa Falls was established. Its name was changed to First National when they built a two-story brick building at this location two years later. In 1917 the bank decided it needed a new facility, so they turned to the Lytle Company of Sioux City, Iowa, which specialized in designing bank buildings. They designed this two-story brick Neoclassical structure. A rich surface pattern on the building was achieved with the use of terra cotta and special colors of brick. First National continued in business here until December 21, 1932, when it closed its doors. Iowa Falls State Bank was organized and opened in this building on May 25, 1933. In more recent years they expanded into the modern building immediately to the west.

The building was individually listed on the National Register of Historic Places in 1993. It was included as a contributing property in the Washington Avenue Commercial Historic District in 2012.
