= Steamboat Rock Consolidated Schools Building =

- U.S. National Register of Historic Places
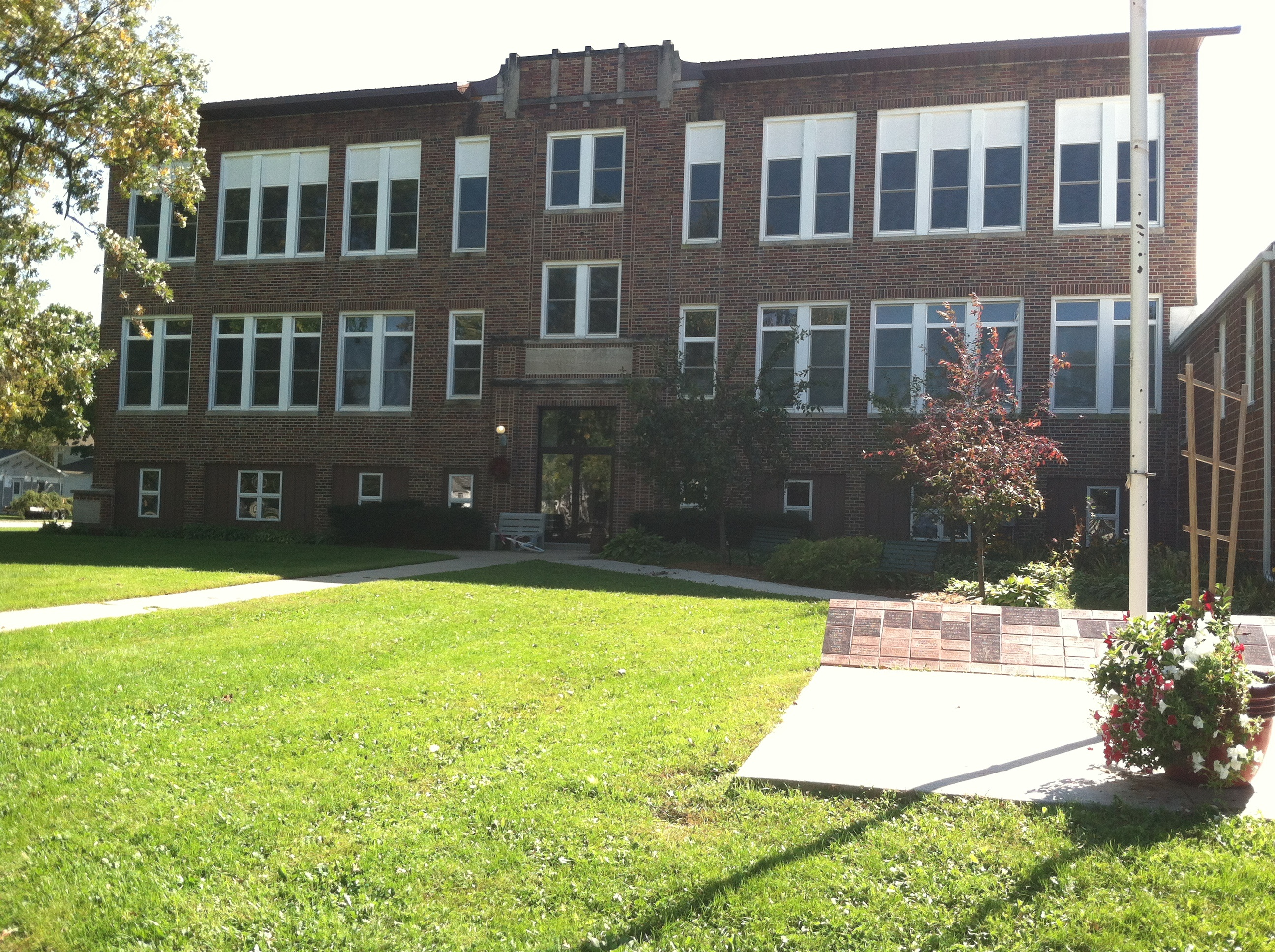

- Location within Iowa Location within the United States
- Location: 306 W. Market St. Steamboat Rock, Iowa
- Coordinates: 42°24′29″N 93°03′54.6″W
- Area: less than one acre
- Built: 1928, 1956
- Architect: Harry Reimer; Glen Ralston
- Architectural style: Modern Movement
- NRHP reference No.: 04000243
- Added to NRHP: March 31, 2004

Steamboat Rock Consolidated Schools Building, also known as the Steamboat Rock Community School, is a historic building located in Steamboat Rock, Iowa, United States. The first school in town was a one-room school that opened a year after the town was platted in 1855. A two-story brick school building was completed in 1869. Beginning in 1919 rural school districts began to merge with the Steamboat Rock district, which began to substantially increase the student population. The main part of this school building was completed in 1928. The gymnasium/music room/shop building was added in 1956 to accommodate the post World War II baby boom. As the 20th century continued the population in rural areas declined, which affected enrollment. The Steamboat Rock School merged with the Wellsburg and Ackley-Geneva districts in 1997, and this building was left empty. The city acquired it in 1999, and it now houses a variety of retail businesses and offices. The building was listed on the National Register of Historic Places in 2004.
