= Metropolitan Opera House (Iowa Falls, Iowa) =

- U.S. National Register of Historic Places
- U.S. Historic district – Contributing property
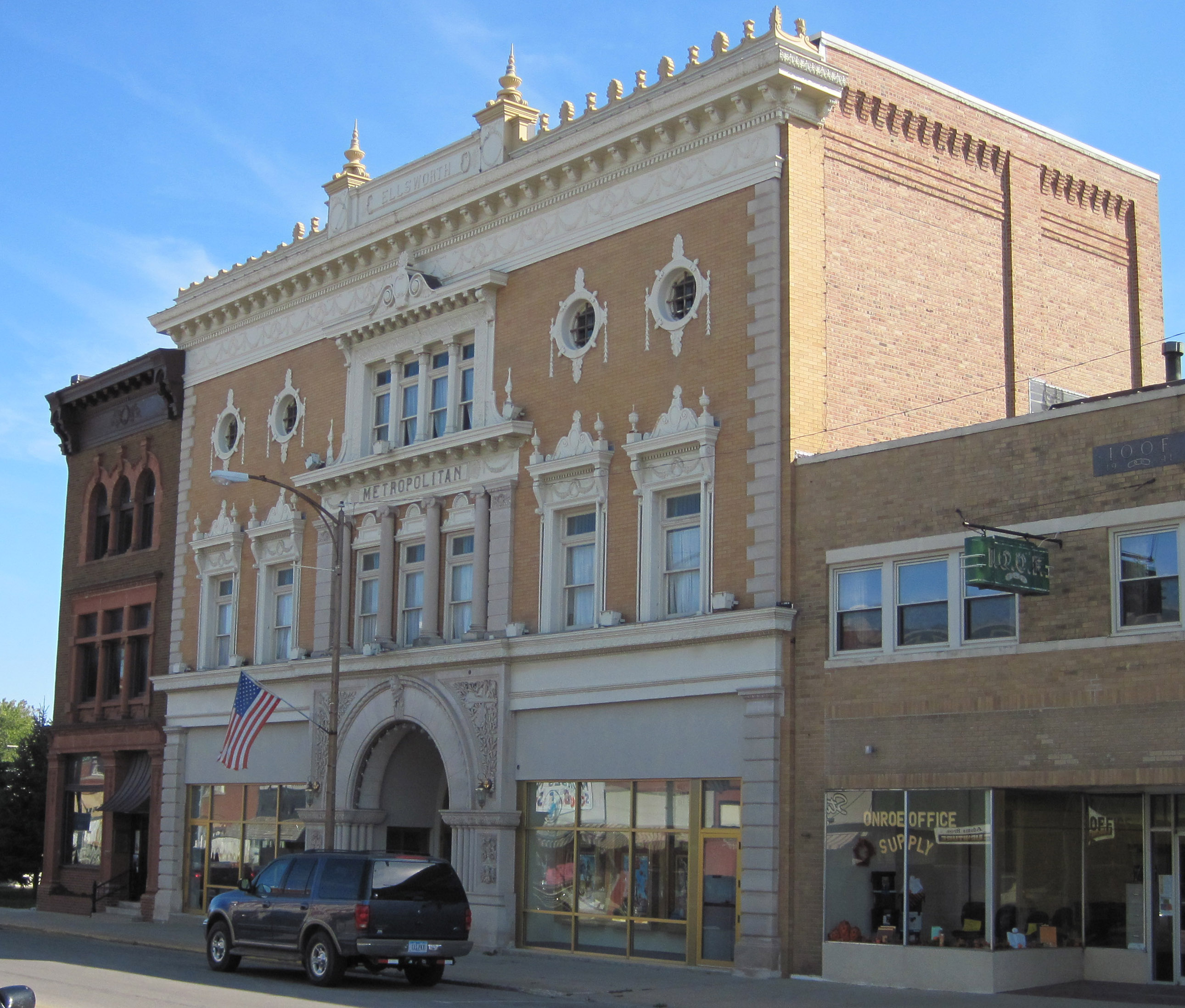

- Location within Iowa Location within the United States
- Location: 515 Washington St. Iowa Falls, Iowa
- Coordinates: 42°30′55″N 93°16′8″W
- Built: 1899
- Architect: O'Meyer & Thori
- Architectural style: Renaissance Revival; Italian Renaissance
- Part of: Washington Avenue Commercial Historic District (ID12000889)
- NRHP reference No.: 75000690
- Added to NRHP: February 20, 1975

The Metropolitan Opera House (MOH, The Met) is a historic opera house in Iowa Falls, Iowa, United States. It was individually listed on the National Register of Historic Places in 1975. In 2012 it was included as a contributing property in the Washington Avenue Commercial Historic District.

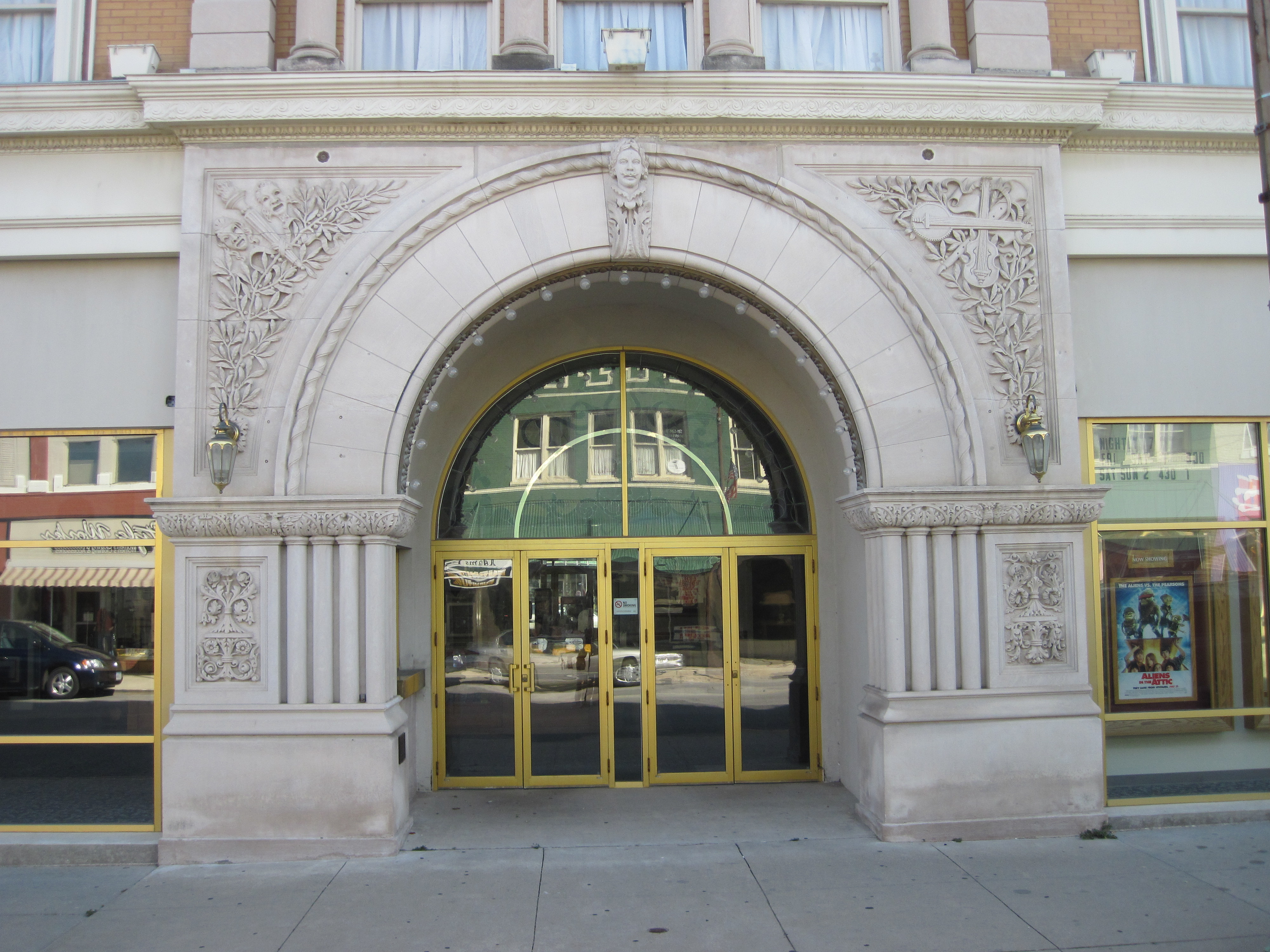
Entrance to the Met.

The Metropolitan Opera House was designed by the Omeyer & Thori architecture firm and opened with its first performance on December 27, 1899, with an audience numbering over 800, later proclaimed as the "biggest social event in the history of Iowa Falls." The house hosted notable artists including Otis Skinner, Walker Whiteside, and John Philip Sousa and his band. The Met first started showing silent movies in 1916 with the first being "Birth of a Nation". It would continue to follow the progression of technology by showing its first "talkie" or movie with traditional audio in 1930. And in 1939 showed its first Technicolor film "Shirley Temple the little princess".

The theatre underwent restoration in 1993 and received upgrades to its digital projectors in June 2013 after it was purchased by John P. Whitesell of Iowa Falls.

Oscar-nominated actor Hugh Jackman appeared at The Met's grand re-opening with his family on September 20, 2013. He introduced two of his films — Prisoners and The Wolverine.
