= Mills Tower Historic District =

Historic district in Iowa, United States

- U.S. National Register of Historic Places
- U.S. Historic district
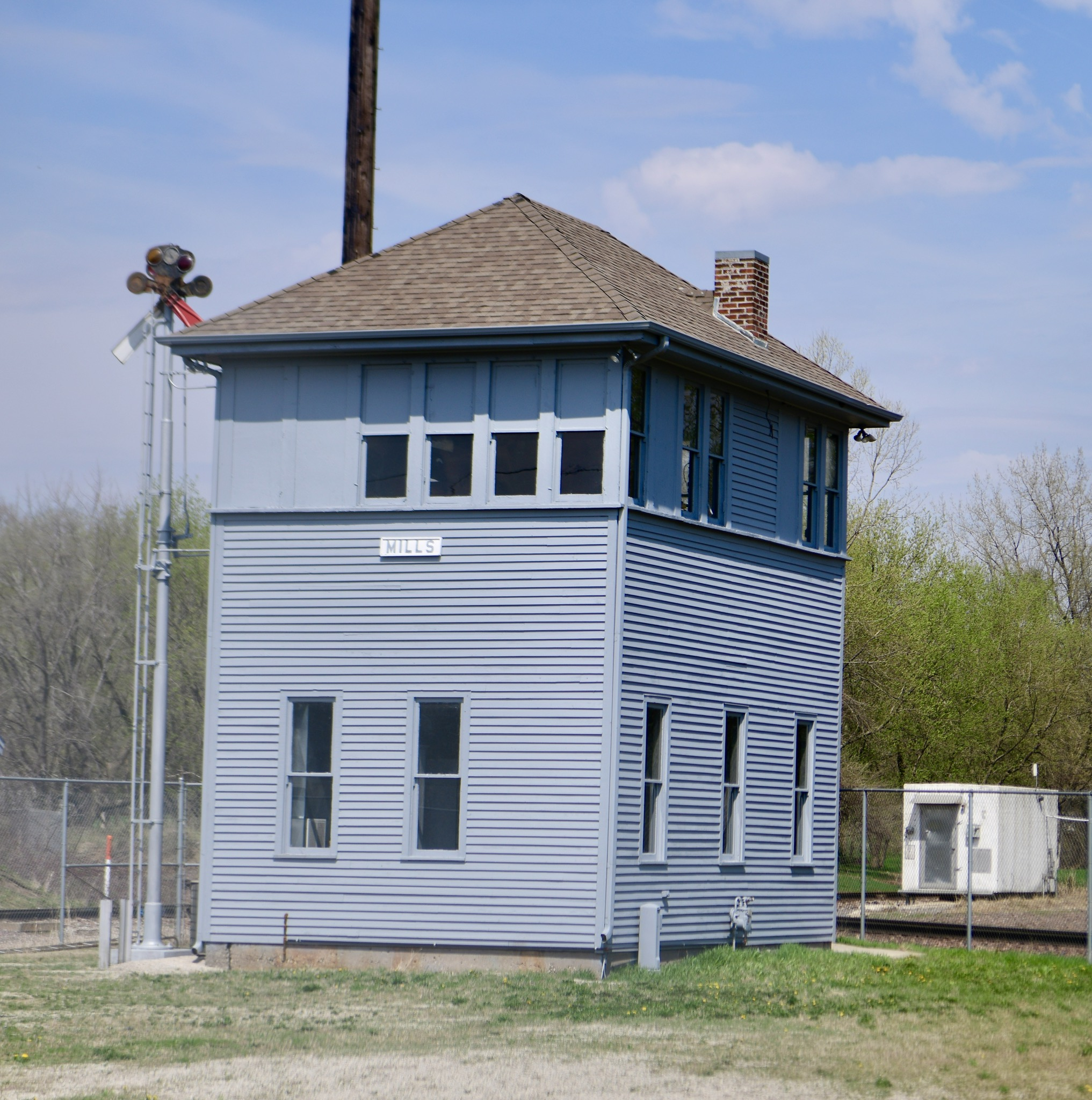
- Mills Tower (c. 1909)

- Location within Iowa Location within the United States
- Location: E. Rocksylvania Ave., 1/3 mile east of Freight House, Iowa Falls, Iowa
- Coordinates: 42°31′22″N 93°14′55″W
- Area: 1.79 acres (0.72 ha)
- Architect: Illinois Central Railroad
- MPS: Advent & Development of Railroads in Iowa MPS
- NRHP reference No.: 90001304
- Added to NRHP: September 6, 1990

The Mills Tower Historic District is a nationally recognized historic district located in Iowa Falls, Iowa, United States. It was listed on the National Register of Historic Places in 1990. At the time of its nomination the district consisted of six resources, including two contributing buildings, and four non-contributing buildings. All of the buildings are associated with the Illinois Central Railroad (IC). The Dubuque & Sioux City Railroad, an affiliate of the IC, laid the first rail track to Iowa Falls in 1866. The following year the Iowa Falls & Sioux City Railroad, another IC affiliate, continued construction of the line to the west, and it reached Sioux City by 1870. The Burlington, Cedar Rapids and Northern Railway (BCR&N) by way of its affiliate the Cedar Rapids, Iowa Falls & North Western, entered Iowa Falls in 1880. Two years later it was expanded to the north and intersected with the IC main line, which required a controlled crossing. Little is known about this first crossing and what it contained.

Iowa Falls businessman E.S. Ellsworth founded the Des Moines, Iowa Falls & Northern Railroad (DIF&N) in 1899 with the intention of connecting Iowa Falls to Des Moines. The Chicago, Rock Island and Pacific Railroad acquired the BCR&N in 1903, and created the St. Paul & Des Moines Railroad to acquire the DIF&N and to complete the line to St. Paul, Minnesota beginning in 1905. This new Rock Island route created a new Junction with the IC to the east of the original Iowa Falls junction. The two-story frame Mills Tower was built at the new junction about 1909. It was designed by the IC and may have been built by them as well. Offices were located on the first floor, and the control room was on the second floor. The second contributing building is the c. 1912 signal maintainers and supply house. It was used mainly as storage and office space for the switchtender. The other buildings in this district were built later. They include the coal house, oil house, and tool house, all from about 1945, and an outhouse from 1976.
