= Hardin County Home Historic District =

Historic district in Iowa, United States

- U.S. National Register of Historic Places
- U.S. Historic district
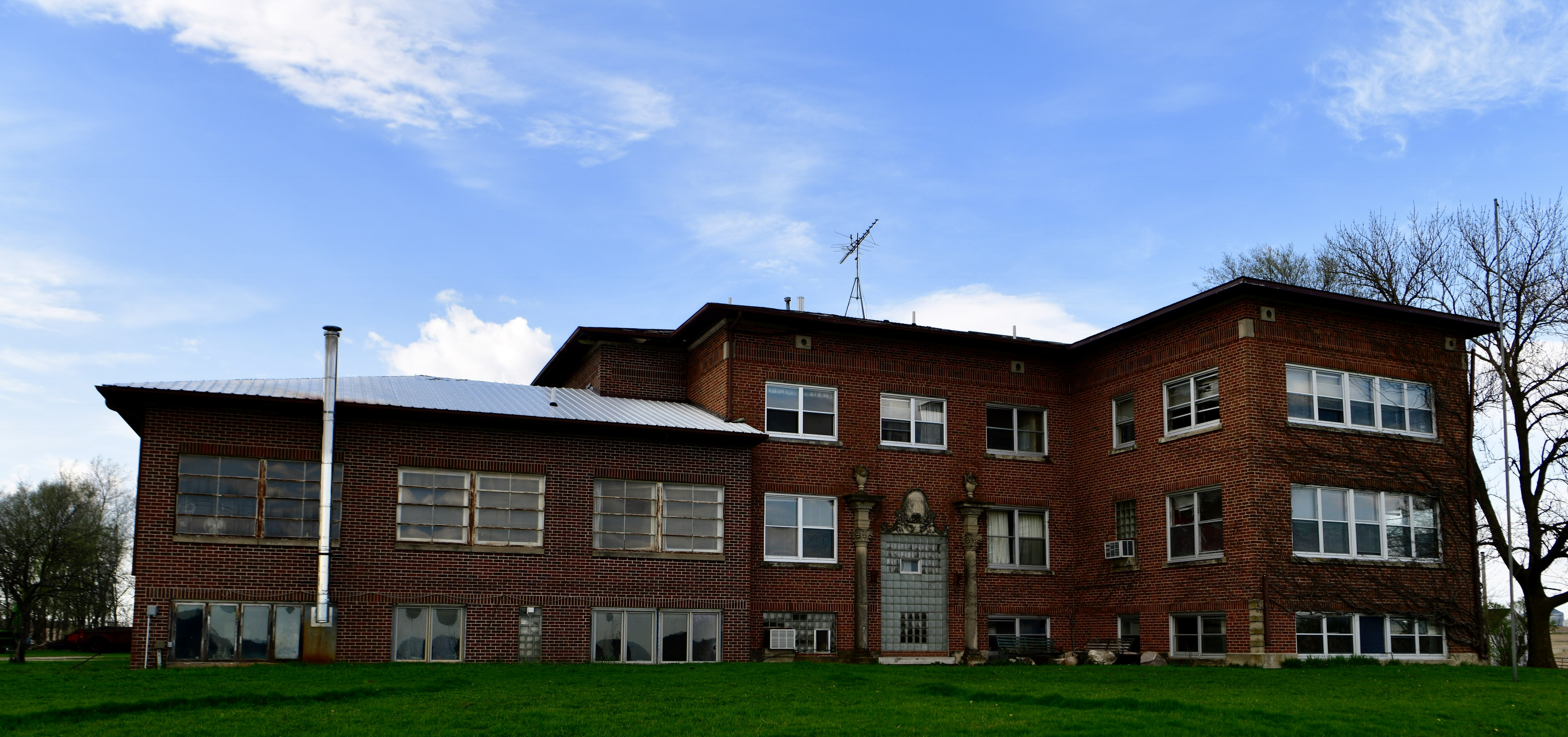

- Location within Iowa Location within the United States
- Location: 28483 County Road D41; Eldora, Iowa
- Coordinates: 42°24′02.6″N 93°08′55.5″W
- Area: 136 acres (55 ha)
- Architect: Willfred D. Holtzman, Jr. Smith & Voohees
- Architectural style: Classical Revival; Modern Movement
- NRHP reference No.: 10000275
- Added to NRHP: May 24, 2010

The Hardin County Home Historic District, also known as Hardin County Poor Farm, Hardin County Farm, and the Hardin County Care Facility, is a nationally recognized historic district located northwest of Eldora, Iowa, United States. It was listed on the National Register of Historic Places in 2010. At the time of its nomination the district consisted of six resources, including three contributing buildings, one contributing site, and two non-contributing buildings. Beginning in the mid-19th century county homes were established across the state to take care of less fortunate residents. The care then extended to the end of the 20th century. The Hardin County Home operated at this location from 1877 to 1996. The historic district encompasses the buildings, farm fields, and cemetery associated with the home. The first burial in the cemetery, located on the southwest corner of the property, was in 1877. The graves are marked with simple stone markers. The last burial was in 2008. Farm fields surround the buildings and extend to the north.

The original home was destroyed in an April 1924 fire. Des Moines architect Willfred Holtzman, Jr. designed a three-story, brick, Neoclassical building to replace it. The T-plan structure was completed in 1927 when the funds became available to complete it. This is the only county home in Iowa that is known to be built in the 1920s. It was expanded in 1953 with a two-story addition in that follows the Modern Movement. A new barn had been completed two years prior. A hollow tile block pump house, built either in the 1920s or in the 1950s, is the third contributing building. The non-contributing buildings include a shelter house (c. 1975), used for outdoor events, and a machine/equipment shed (c. 1977). In the second half of the 20th century, the home became more of a nursing home, and it served that purpose until it closed in 1996. The residents at that time were moved into Eldora.
