= New Providence Building Association Stores =

- U.S. National Register of Historic Places
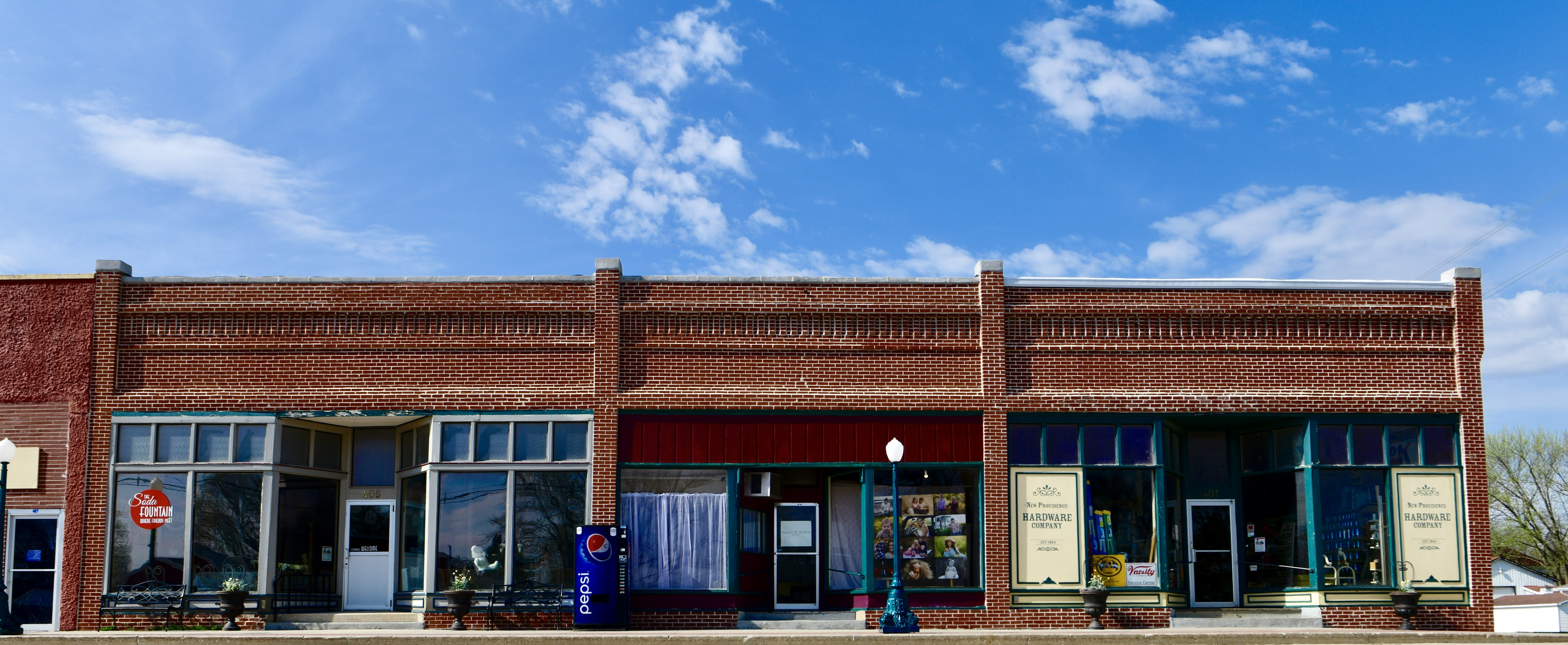

- Location within Iowa Location within the United States
- Location: 401–405 W. Main St., New Providence, Iowa
- Coordinates: 42°16′53.8″N 93°10′19.2″W
- Area: less than one acre
- Built: 1911
- Architectural style: Late 19th and Early 20th Century American Movements
- NRHP reference No.: 16000081
- Added to NRHP: March 15, 2016

The New Providence Building Association Stores is a historic building located in New Providence, Iowa, United States. Numerous businesses in the town that were located in wooden structures in the central business district were destroyed by a fire on December 30, 1910. As a result, the citizens of the town banded together and formed the New Providence Building Association. It was established to buy land and construct buildings in which businesses would lease space. Such a community based effort was necessary because New Providence, which had been by-passed by the Chicago and North Western Railroad, needed economic stability to stay viable. This single-story, three storefront, brick building was built by the association. Its brickwork and large display windows are characteristic of commercial buildings from the late 19th and early 20th centuries. The building was listed together on the National Register of Historic Places in 2016.
