= Iowa River =

Tributary of the Mississippi River in Iowa, United States

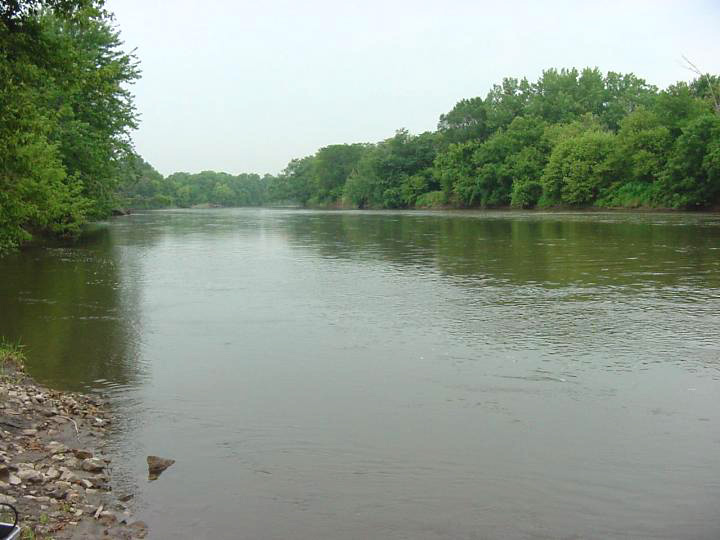
- The Iowa River upstream of Marshalltown, Iowa

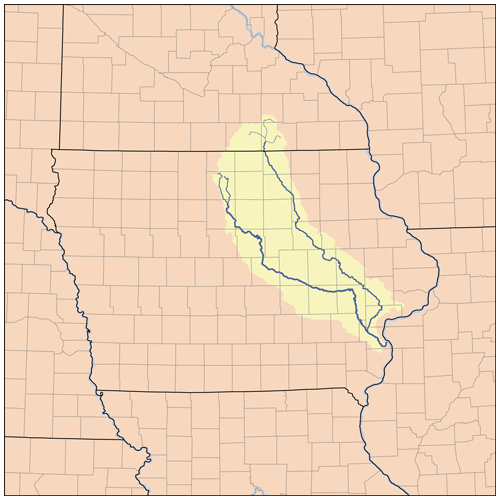
- Map showing the Iowa River (to the left) and its tributary the Cedar River

Location
- Country: United States
- State: Iowa

Physical characteristics
- Source: confluence of East Branch Iowa River and West Branch Iowa River
  - location: Belmond
  - coordinates: 42.860524°N 93.6138214°W
- Mouth: Mississippi River
  - location: near Toolesboro
  - coordinates: 41°9′38″N 91°1′26″W
- Length: 323 mi (520 km)
- Discharge
  - location: Oakville, Iowa
  - average: 14,109 cu/ft. per sec.

Basin features
- River system: Mississippi River
- Tributaries
  - left: Swisher Creek, Cedar River
  - right: English River

The Iowa River is a tributary of the Mississippi River in the state of Iowa in the United States. It is about 323 miles (520 km) long and is open to small river craft to Iowa City, about 65 miles (105 km) from its mouth. Its major tributary is the Cedar River.

== Course ==
It rises in two branches, the West Branch and East Branch, both of which have their headwaters in Hancock County, each about 38 miles (61 km) long and which join in Belmond.

The Iowa then proceeds roughly in a southeast direction, passing through the city of Iowa Falls, through a scenic valley to Steamboat Rock, then through the cities of Eldora, Marshalltown, Tama, and Marengo, and through the Amana Colonies in Iowa County. In Johnson County, it becomes impounded by the Coralville Dam in the Coralville Reservoir, which turns southward to the spillway. The river runs generally south and passes through Iowa City and the University of Iowa campus. A lowhead dam at Burlington Street in Iowa City is the last dam before the river's confluence with the Mississippi. South of Iowa City, it is joined in Washington County by the English River, and then in Louisa County it is joined by the Cedar River to flow into the Mississippi.

== Uses ==
The Iowa River is noted for recreational and commercial fishing. Game fish include largemouth and smallmouth bass, walleye, northern pike, channel and flathead catfish, crappie and other panfish. The Coralville Reservoir is commercially fished for carp and buffalo fish.

Pine Lake State Park is located on the Iowa River at Eldora.

== Floods ==
The Iowa can flood, notably in the June 2008 Midwest floods, and the Great Flood of 1993. The Cedar and its tributaries, including the Shell Rock River, can contribute to flooding events. It tore down the historical swinging bridge in Charles City, Iowa.

== August 2022 jawbone discovery ==
On the afternoon of August 8, 2022, Marshall County Conservation staff discovered a jawbone from a prehistoric Native American of middle age or older in the Iowa River in Marshall County.

== See also ==
- Homer D. Calkins
- List of rivers of Iowa
