= Iowa Falls, Iowa =

- City
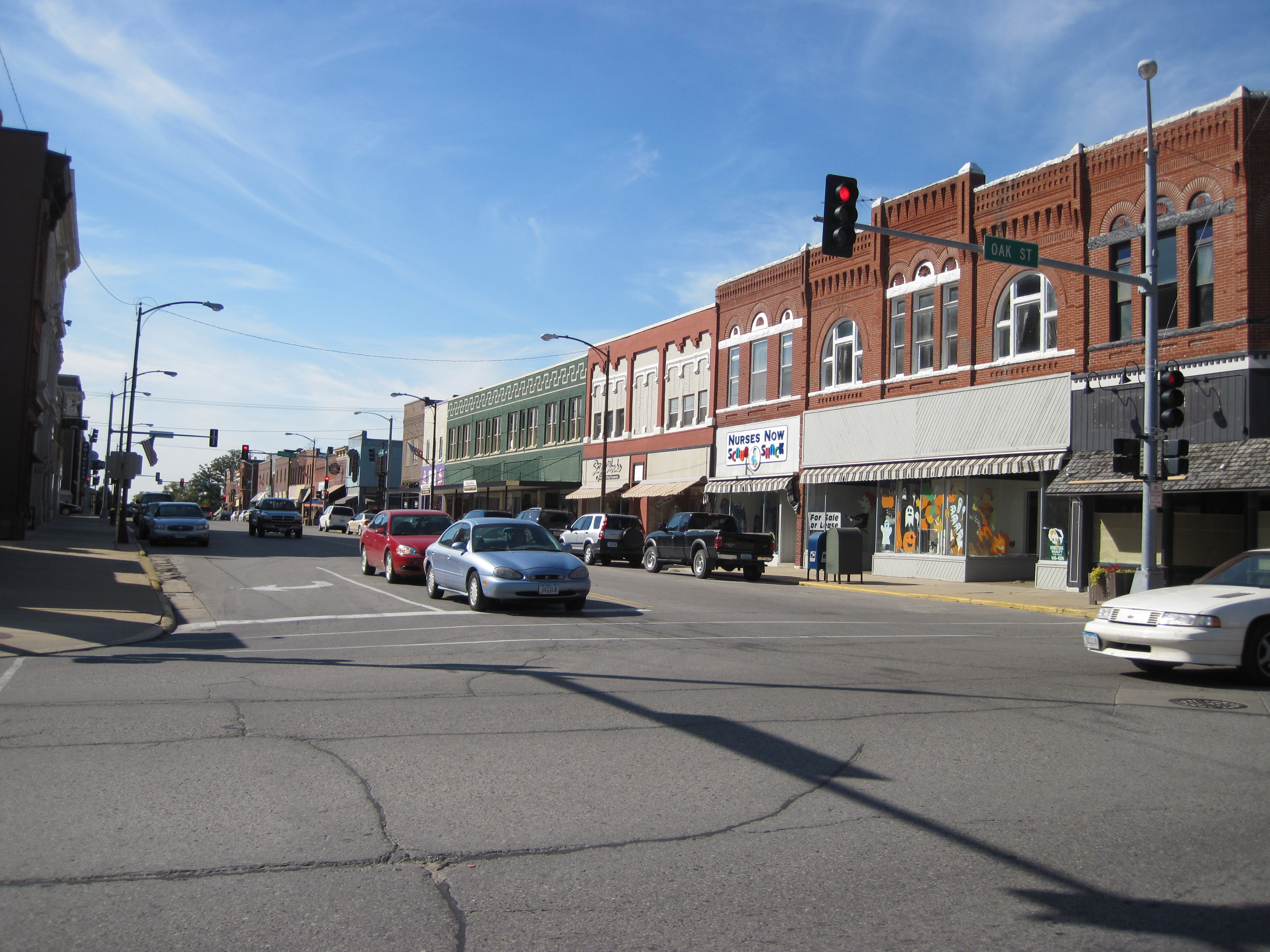
- Downtown Iowa Falls in 2009
- Nickname: The Scenic City
- Location of Iowa Falls, Iowa
- Coordinates: 42°31′N 93°16′W
- Country: USA
- State: Iowa
- County: Hardin

Area
  - Total: 5.46 sq mi (14.15 km^{2})
  - Land: 5.39 sq mi (13.95 km^{2})
  - Water: 0.077 sq mi (0.20 km^{2})
- Elevation: 1,106 ft (337 m)

Population (2020)
  - Total: 5,106
  - Density: 948.1/sq mi (366.06/km^{2})
- Time zone: UTC-6 (Central (CST))
  - Summer (DST): UTC-5 (CDT)
- ZIP code: 50126
- Area code: 641
- FIPS code: 19-38640
- GNIS feature ID: 2395433
- Website: www.cityofiowafalls.com

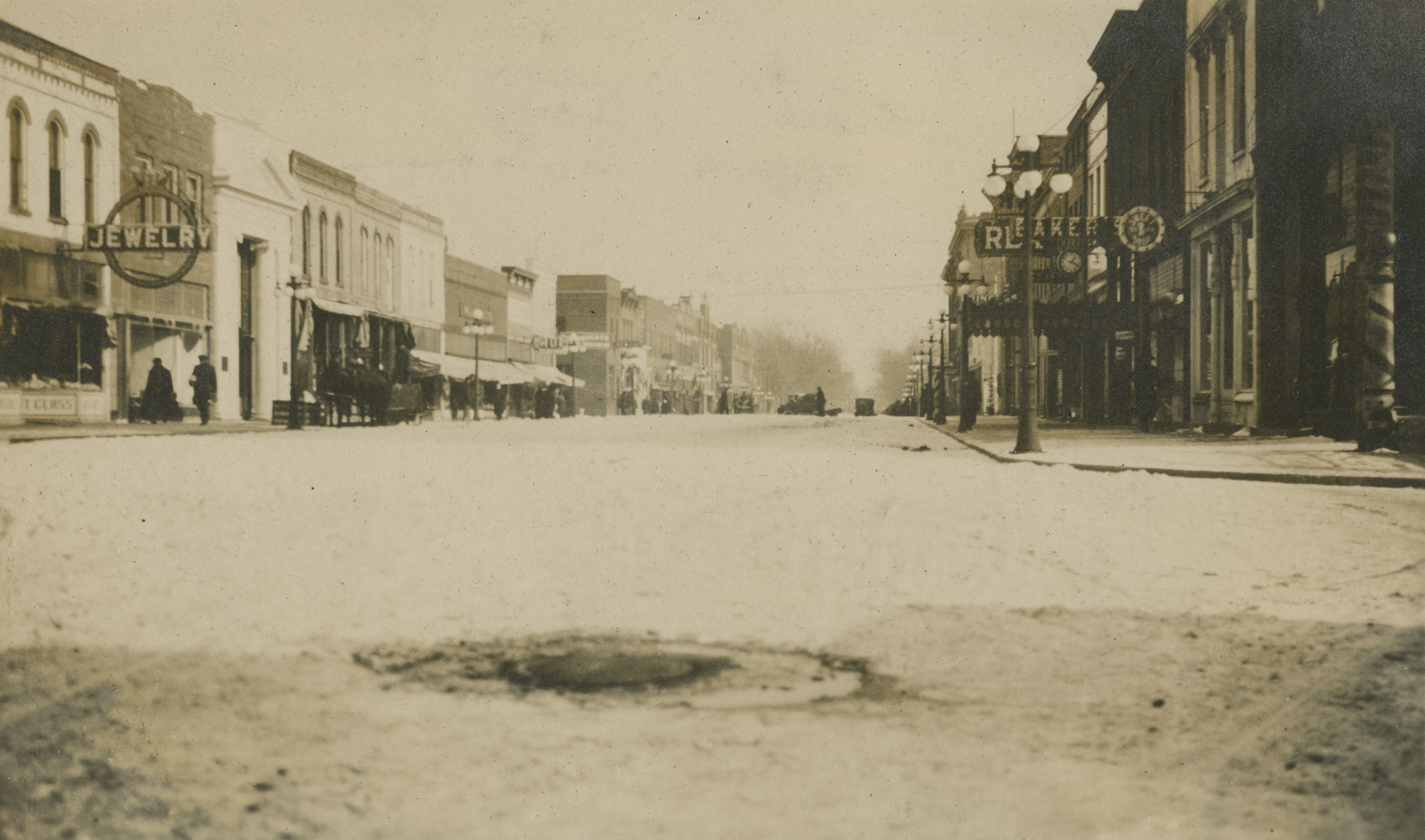
Main Street, Iowa Falls, Iowa, 1915

Iowa Falls is a city in Hardin County, Iowa, United States. Iowa Falls is the home of Ellsworth Community College. It is also a regional transportation center, along U.S. Routes 20 and 65 and the Canadian National and Union Pacific Railroads. The population was 5,106 at the 2020 census.

== History ==
Iowa Falls was laid out and platted in 1856. The area had been known as Rocksylvania, but due to the difficulty of pronunciation and spelling, it was changed to Iowa Falls. It was named for the falls on the Iowa River.

The Illinois Central Railroad was built through Iowa Falls in 1866.

The Metropolitan Opera House was built in 1899. It presented plays, operas, and vaudeville during the first half of the 20th century and is listed on the National Register of Historic Places.

The Iowa Falls Popcorn Stand, in Estes Park, is Iowa's oldest extant popcorn stand. It opened on May 29, 1948, as "Louie's Korn Krib."

== Geography ==
According to the United States Census Bureau, the city has an area of 5.44 square miles (14.09 km^{2}), of which 5.36 square miles (13.88 km^{2}) is land and 0.08 square miles (0.21 km^{2}) is water.

Iowa Falls is at the point where the Iowa River flows through a limestone gorge 70 feet (21.34 m) deep between bluffs that rise another 50 feet (15.24 m). The falls were also known as the "rapids of the Iowa." They are now submerged by a dam built in 1926 that is 26 feet (7.92 m) feet high and 200 feet long and serves a hydroelectric power station that generates 1.5MW.

=== Climate ===
According to the Köppen Climate Classification system, Iowa Falls has a hot-summer humid continental climate, abbreviated "Dfa" on climate maps.

Climate data for Iowa Falls, Iowa, 1991–2020 normals, extremes 1893–present
Month	Jan	Feb	Mar	Apr	May	Jun	Jul	Aug	Sep	Oct	Nov	Dec	Year
Record high °F (°C)	68 (20)	68 (20)	87 (31)	97 (36)	107 (42)	107 (42)	111 (44)	108 (42)	101 (38)	95 (35)	79 (26)	70 (21)	111 (44)
Mean maximum °F (°C)	46.6 (8.1)	51.7 (10.9)	67.5 (19.7)	81.4 (27.4)	87.4 (30.8)	91.8 (33.2)	92.6 (33.7)	90.6 (32.6)	89.0 (31.7)	82.5 (28.1)	67.2 (19.6)	51.1 (10.6)	94.1 (34.5)
Mean daily maximum °F (°C)	25.7 (−3.5)	30.6 (−0.8)	43.5 (6.4)	58.3 (14.6)	69.9 (21.1)	79.9 (26.6)	82.9 (28.3)	80.8 (27.1)	74.8 (23.8)	61.7 (16.5)	45.0 (7.2)	31.5 (−0.3)	57.1 (13.9)
Daily mean °F (°C)	16.9 (−8.4)	21.3 (−5.9)	33.9 (1.1)	46.8 (8.2)	58.8 (14.9)	69.1 (20.6)	72.6 (22.6)	70.2 (21.2)	62.7 (17.1)	50.0 (10.0)	35.3 (1.8)	23.2 (−4.9)	46.7 (8.2)
Mean daily minimum °F (°C)	8.1 (−13.3)	12.1 (−11.1)	24.4 (−4.2)	35.3 (1.8)	47.7 (8.7)	58.4 (14.7)	62.2 (16.8)	59.7 (15.4)	50.6 (10.3)	38.3 (3.5)	25.6 (−3.6)	14.9 (−9.5)	36.4 (2.5)
Mean minimum °F (°C)	−14.2 (−25.7)	−8.7 (−22.6)	3.1 (−16.1)	21.5 (−5.8)	33.5 (0.8)	46.7 (8.2)	51.9 (11.1)	49.9 (9.9)	36.0 (2.2)	23.2 (−4.9)	8.9 (−12.8)	−6.0 (−21.1)	−17.2 (−27.3)
Record low °F (°C)	−34 (−37)	−32 (−36)	−31 (−35)	3 (−16)	18 (−8)	34 (1)	36 (2)	31 (−1)	19 (−7)	−5 (−21)	−13 (−25)	−31 (−35)	−34 (−37)
Average precipitation inches (mm)	0.92 (23)	1.16 (29)	2.08 (53)	3.80 (97)	5.57 (141)	6.13 (156)	4.54 (115)	4.37 (111)	3.49 (89)	2.56 (65)	1.97 (50)	1.54 (39)	38.13 (968)
Average snowfall inches (cm)	7.1 (18)	7.1 (18)	4.5 (11)	1.3 (3.3)	0.0 (0.0)	0.0 (0.0)	0.0 (0.0)	0.0 (0.0)	0.0 (0.0)	0.0 (0.0)	1.6 (4.1)	6.1 (15)	27.7 (69.4)
Average precipitation days (≥ 0.01 in)	6.7	6.2	7.5	10.6	12.8	11.5	8.8	9.4	8.3	8.5	6.6	7.1	104
Average snowy days (≥ 0.1 in)	5.0	4.4	2.2	0.7	0.0	0.0	0.0	0.0	0.0	0.0	1.3	4.6	18.2
Source 1: NOAA
Source 2: National Weather Service

== Demographics ==
Historical populations
Year	Pop.	±%
1880	955	—
1890	1,796	+88.1%
1900	2,840	+58.1%
1910	2,797	−1.5%
1920	3,954	+41.4%
1930	4,112	+4.0%
1940	4,425	+7.6%
1950	4,900	+10.7%
1960	5,565	+13.6%
1970	6,454	+16.0%
1980	6,174	−4.3%
1990	5,435	−12.0%
2000	5,193	−4.5%
2010	5,238	+0.9%
2020	5,106	−2.5%
Source:"U.S. Census website". United States Census Bureau. and Iowa Data Center; Source: U.S. Decennial Census

=== 2020 census ===
As of the 2020 census, Iowa Falls had 5,106 people, 2,146 households, and 1,235 families. The population density was 948.1 inhabitants per square mile (366.1/km^{2}). There were 2,422 housing units at an average density of 449.7 per square mile (173.6/km^{2}).

The median age was 40.7 years. 21.2% of residents were under the age of 18 and 23.7% were 65 years of age or older. For every 100 females, there were 94.4 males, and for every 100 females age 18 and over, there were 90.5 males age 18 and over.

96.6% of residents lived in urban areas, while 3.4% lived in rural areas.

Of the 2,146 households, 26.1% had children under the age of 18 living in them. Of all households, 42.3% were married-couple households, 20.8% were households with a male householder and no spouse or partner present, and 30.6% were households with a female householder and no spouse or partner present. About 42.5% of households were non-families, 37.3% were made up of individuals, and 19.8% had someone living alone who was 65 years of age or older.

Of housing units, 11.4% were vacant. The homeowner vacancy rate was 2.2% and the rental vacancy rate was 14.0%.

Racial composition as of the 2020 census
Race	Number	Percent
White	4,550	89.1%
Black or African American	57	1.1%
American Indian and Alaska Native	18	0.4%
Asian	44	0.9%
Native Hawaiian and Other Pacific Islander	1	0.0%
Some other race	175	3.4%
Two or more races	261	5.1%
Hispanic or Latino (of any race)	335	6.6%

=== 2010 census ===
At the 2010 census there were 5,238 people, 2,207 households, and 1,295 families living in the city. The population density was 977.2 inhabitants per square mile (377.3/km^{2}). There were 2,462 housing units at an average density of 459.3 per square mile (177.3/km^{2}). The racial makup of the city was 94.0% White, 2.7% African American, 0.4% Native American, 0.7% Asian, 1.0% from other races, and 1.1% from two or more races. Hispanic or Latino of any race were 3.9%.

Of the 2,207 households 26.8% had children under the age of 18 living with them, 44.0% were married couples living together, 10.6% had a female householder with no husband present, 4.1% had a male householder with no wife present, and 41.3% were non-families. 37.1% of households were one person and 18.9% were one person aged 65 or older. The average household size was 2.17 and the average family size was 2.81.

The median age was 40.9 years. 21.2% of residents were under the age of 18; 12.6% were between the ages of 18 and 24; 20.2% were from 25 to 44; 23.6% were from 45 to 64; and 22.4% were 65 or older. The gender makeup of the city was 48.2% male and 51.8% female.

=== 2000 census ===
At the 2000 census there were 5,193 people, 2,215 households, and 1,331 families living in the city. The population density was 1,043.1 inhabitants per square mile (402.7/km^{2}). There were 2,412 housing units at an average density of 484.5 per square mile (187.1/km^{2}). The racial makup of the city was 97.34% White, 1.21% African American, 0.15% Native American, 0.33% Asian, 0.42% from other races, and 0.54% from two or more races. Hispanic or Latino of any race were 1.04%.

Of the 2,215 households 25.4% had children under the age of 18 living with them, 48.9% were married couples living together, 8.3% had a female householder with no husband present, and 39.9% were non-families. 34.6% of households were one person and 18.5% were one person aged 65 or older. The average household size was 2.19 and the average family size was 2.81.

The age distribution was20.3% under the age of 18, 13.0% from 18 to 24, 22.2% from 25 to 44, 21.5% from 45 to 64, and 23.1% that were 65 or older. The median age was 41 years. For every 100 females, there were 89.5 males. For every 100 females age 18 and over, there were 85.0 males.

The median household income was $32,141 and the median family income was $42,279. Males had a median income of $31,216 versus $21,004 for females. The per capita income for the city was $18,330. About 7.1% of families and 10.0% of the population were below the poverty line, including 12.5% of those under age 18 and 8.3% of those age 65 or over.

== Economy ==
Iowa Select Farms, Iowa's largest hog producer, is headquartered in Iowa Falls.

== Education ==
Iowa Falls Community School District operates public schools.

== Radio and cable broadcasting ==
KIFG (Iowa River Radio) 95.3 FM, 1510 AM. An over-the-air cable system existed in Iowa Falls, similar to one in Iron Mountain, Michigan. A list of channels and what they rebroadcast:

- K19DX (Lifetime)
- K33ED (Nickelodeon)
- K35EG (TBS)
- K45EF (TLC)
- K49DZ (CMT)
- K51EP (A&E)
- K55EG (TCM)
- K57GN
- K59FM (Headline News)

== Notable people ==
- Nick Collison, NBA basketball player
- Joseph Gomer, Tuskegee airman
- Kurt Ploeger, former NFL player
- Bill Riley Sr., television personality
- Randy Schultz former NFL player
- Jim Trickey, football player
- Christopher Whitesell, writer
- Jim Whitesell, basketball coach
- John Whitesell, Hollywood director
- Patrick Whitesell, Hollywood agent and co-CEO of WME Entertainment
- Sean Whitesell, actor, writer, producer

== See also ==
- National Register of Historic Places listings in Hardin County, Iowa
- St. Matthew's by the Bridge Episcopal Church
- Metropolitan Opera House (Iowa Falls, Iowa)
