= List of Art Deco architecture in Iowa =

This is a list of buildings that are examples of the Art Deco architectural style in Iowa, United States.

== Charles City ==
- Charles City School District Building (former Junior High School), Charles City, 1932
- Charles Theatre, Charles City, 1936
- Floyd County Courthouse, Charles City, 1940

== Clinton ==
- Ankeny Building, Clinton, 1931
- Farmers Insurance (former National Guard Building), Clinton, 1930s and 1947
- NelsoCorp Field, Clinton, 1937
- Washington Junior High School and Jefferson Grade School, Clinton, 1935

== Davenport ==
- Hotel Blackhawk, Davenport, 1914
- Mac's Tavern (former C. A. Fick Building), Davenport, 1934
- Mississippi Lofts and Adler Theatre, Davenport, 1931
- Monroe Elementary School, Davenport, 1940
- United States Courthouse, Davenport, 1933

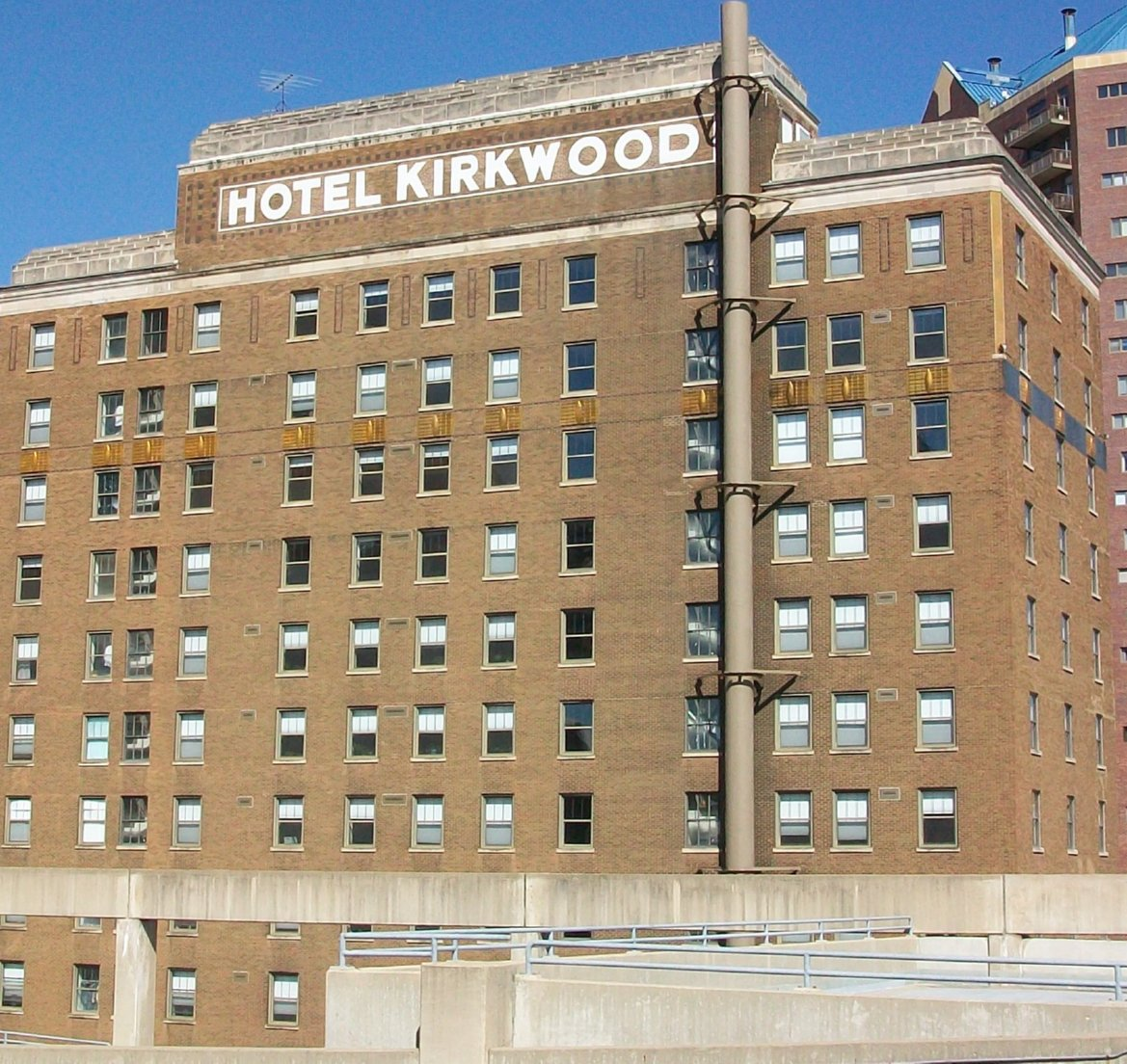
Hotel Kirkwood, Des Moines

== Des Moines ==
- Argonne Armory, Civic Center Historic District, Des Moines, 1934
- AT&T Building (former Northwestern Bell Telephone Company), Des Moines, 1928
- Butler House, Des Moines, 1936
- Des Moines Art Center, Des Moines, 1948
- Des Moines Building, Des Moines, 1930
- Des Moines Fire Department Headquarters, Des Moines, 1937
- Hotel Kirkwood, Des Moines, 1930
- Iowa-Des Moines National Bank Building, Des Moines, 1932
- Youngerman Block, Des Moines, 1935

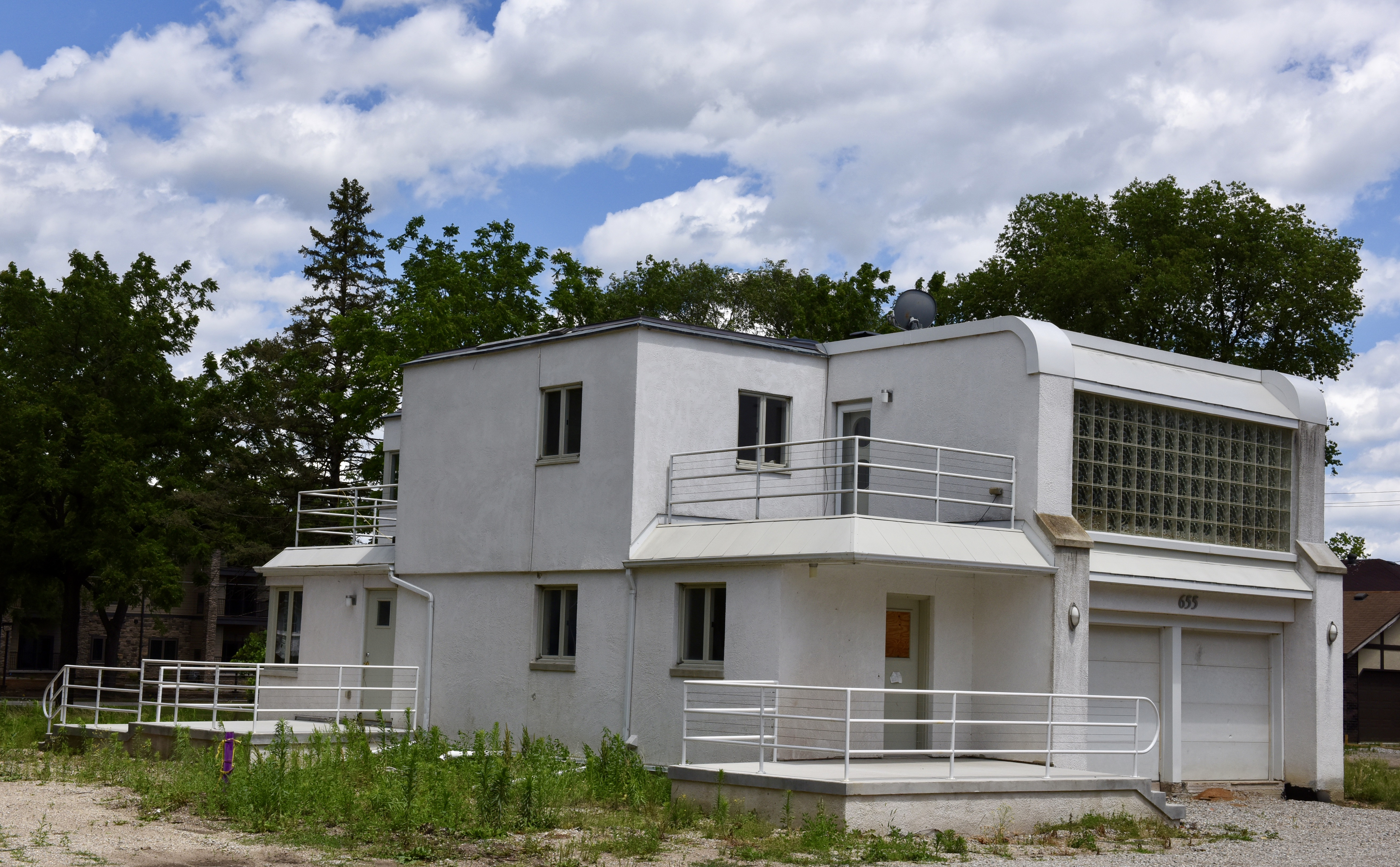
William C. and Margaret Egloff House, Mason City

== Mason City ==
- Engine House No. 2, Mason City, 1939
- Sundell House, Mason City, 1911
- United Methodist Church (former First Methodist Church), Mason City, 1951
- William C. and Margaret Egloff House, Mason City, 1939

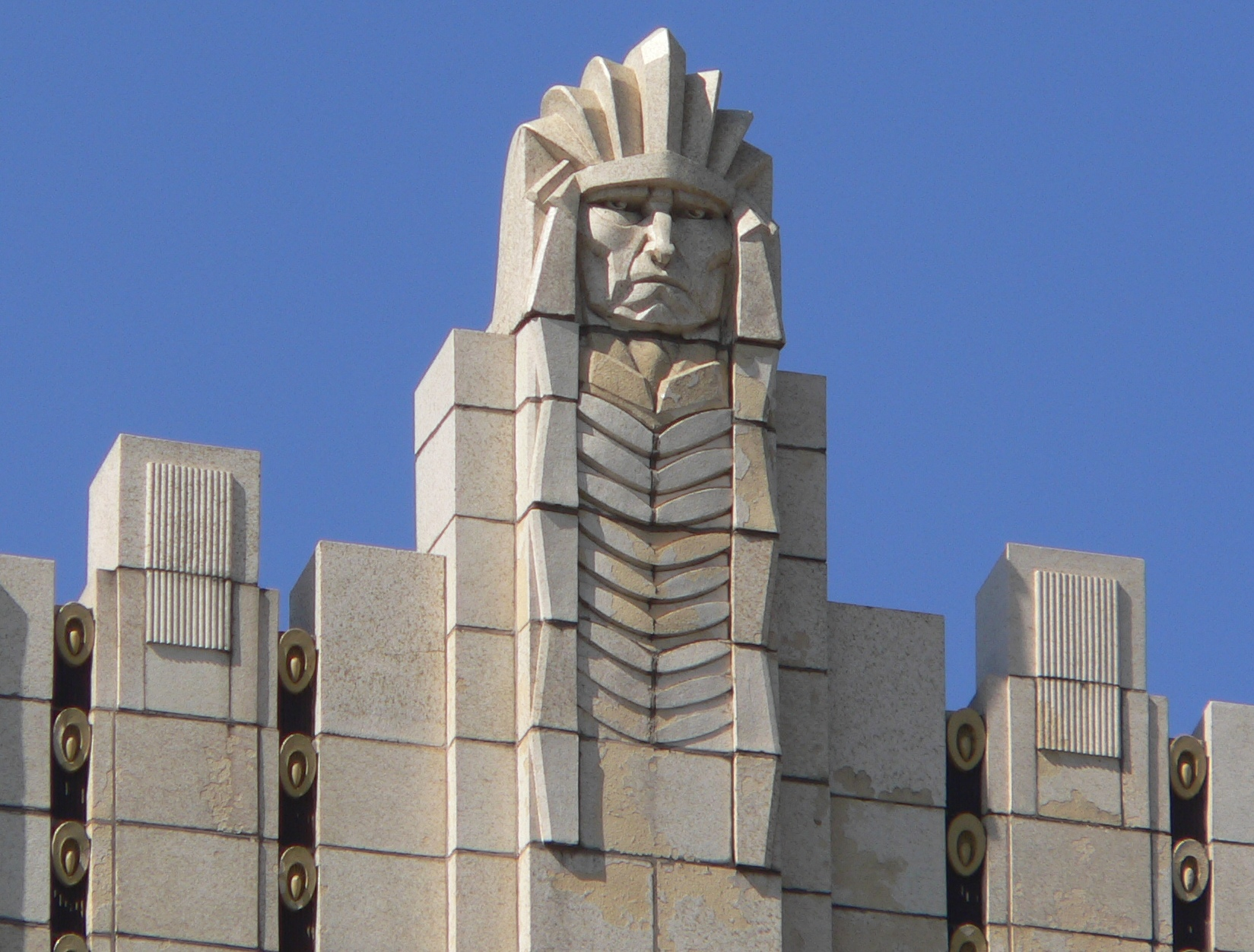
Badgerow Building, Sioux City

== Sioux City ==
- Badgerow Building, Sioux City, 1933
- Federal Building and United States Courthouse, Sioux City, 1932
- Grandview Park Bandshell, Sioux City, 1935
- Leeds Junior High School, Sioux City, 1939
- Roberts Stadium, Sioux City, 1933–42
- Sioux City Municipal Auditorium, Sioux City, 1938
- Warrior Hotel, Sioux City, 1930

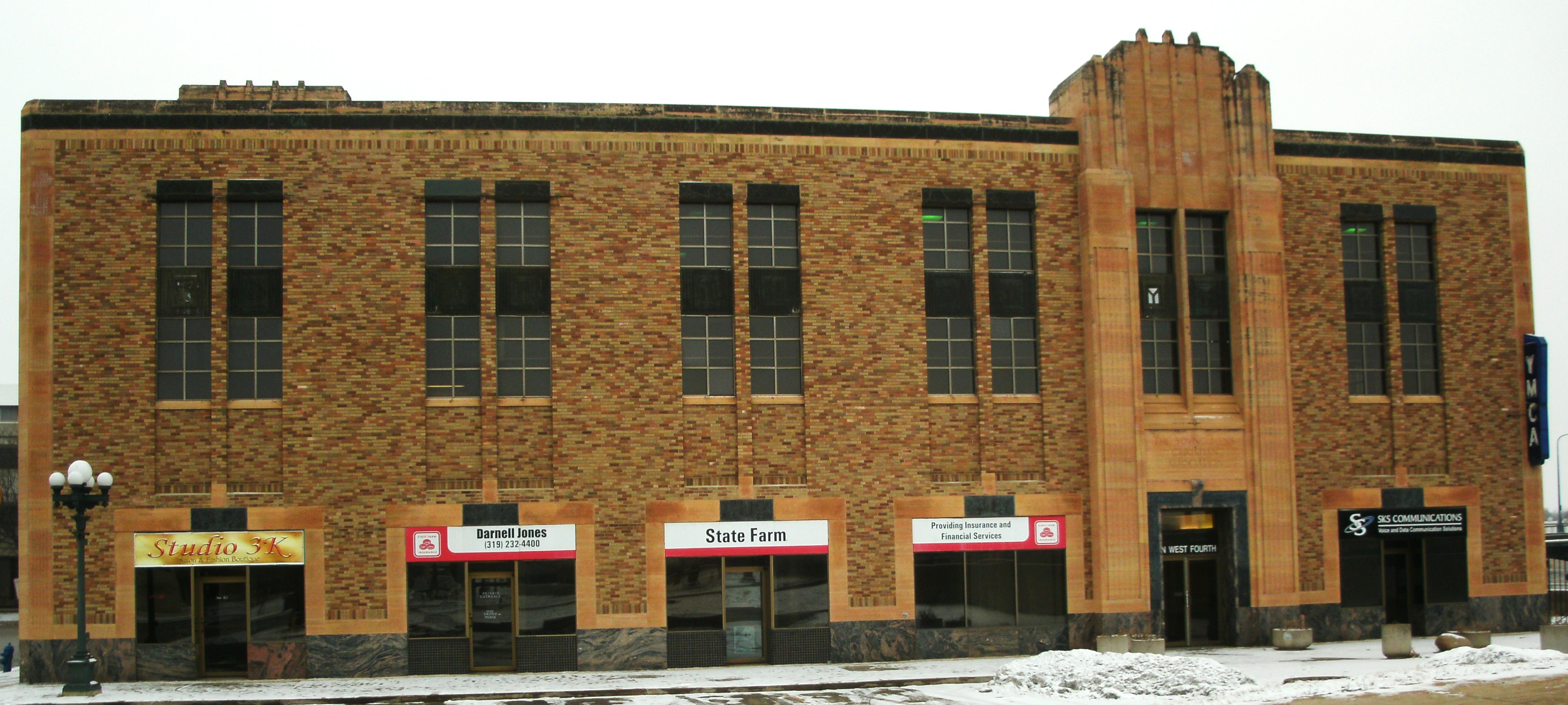
YMCA Building, Waterloo

== Other cities ==
- Allamakee County Courthouse, Waukon, 1940
- American Legion Memorial Building, Atlantic, 1939
- Audubon County Courthouse, Audubon, 1940
- The Avery Theater, Garner, 1931
- Bake's Barber Shop, Moville, 1935
- Big Slough Creek Bridge, Nichols, 1937
- Bremer County Courthouse, Waverly, 1937
- Bruce's Snowball Market No. 1 Addition, Perry, 1930
- Buchanan County Courthouse, Independence, 1940
- Capitol Theater, Burlington, 1937
- Cass County Courthouse, Atlantic, 1934
- Chariton Masonic Temple, Chariton, 1937
- Chickasaw County Courthouse, New Hampton, 1930
- City Hall, Lansing, 1938
- Clay County National Bank, Spencer, 1920s
- Community Building, Hastings, 1937
- Decorah Municipal Bathhouse and Swimming Pool, Decorah, 1937
- Des Moines County Court House, Burlington, 1940
- Estes Park Band Shell, Iowa Falls, 1931
- First United Brethren Church, Toledo, 1946
- Garner–Hayfield-Ventura Junior High School Auditorium and Gymnasium, Ventura, 1941
- Holly Springs Gymnasium and Auditorium, Holly Springs, 1941
- Humboldt County Courthouse, Dakota City, 1939
- Iowa City Press-Citizen Building, Iowa City, 1937
- Iowa Lakes Community College (former Estherville City Hall), Estherville, 1930
- Iowa State Bank & Trust Building, Fairfield, 1955
- Iowa State Highway Commission District 6 Building, Cedar Rapids
- Iowa Theater, Onawa, 1937
- Iowa Theater, Winterset
- Irwin Consolidated School, Irwin, 1918
- Jefferson Elementary School, Creston, 1937
- Jones County Courthouse, Anamosa, 1937
- Louisa County Courthouse, Wapello, 1928
- Malek Theatre, Independence, 1947
- Master Service Station, Waterloo, 1930
- Masters Building, Mount Pleasant, 1937
- New Providence School Gymnasium, New Providence, 1936
- Ocheyedan Town Hall, Ocheyedan, 1940
- Oleson Park Music Pavilion, Fort Dodge, 1938
- Paramount Theatre, Cedar Rapids, 1928
- Phenix School Apartments (former West Des Moines Elementary School), West Des Moines, 1939
- Pioneer Oil Company Filling Station, Grinnell, 1920s and 1931
- Princess Sweet Shop, Iowa Falls, 1935
- Reeve Electric Association Plant, Hampton, 1938
- Roshek's, Dubuque, 1929
- St. Olaf Auditorium, St. Olaf, 1939
- Spencer High School and Auditorium, Spencer, 1937
- State Savings Bank, Council Bluffs, 1947
- Surf Ballroom, Clear Lake, 1933
- United States Post Office, Cresco, 1937
- United States Post Office, Forest City, 1941
- United States Post Office, Mount Ayr, 1939
- United States Post Office, Mount Pleasant, 1935
- United States Post Office, Onawa, 1937
- United States Post Office, Sigourney, 1938
- United States Post Office and Courthouse, Dubuque, 1934
- Veterans Memorial Elementary School, Reno, 1949
- Warren County Courthouse, Indianola, 1939
- West Liberty Bridge, West Liberty, 1937
- Woodbine Normal and Grade School, Woodbine, 1931
- Woodlawn Cemetery Gates and Shelter, Washington, 1917 and 1926
- YMCA Building, Waterloo, 1931

== See also ==
- List of Art Deco architecture
- List of Art Deco architecture in the United States
