= Louisa County Courthouse =

Louisa County Courthouse may refer to:

- Louisa County Courthouse (Iowa)
- Louisa County Courthouse (Virginia)
