= Florence-Council On The Iowa Site =

- U.S. National Register of Historic Places
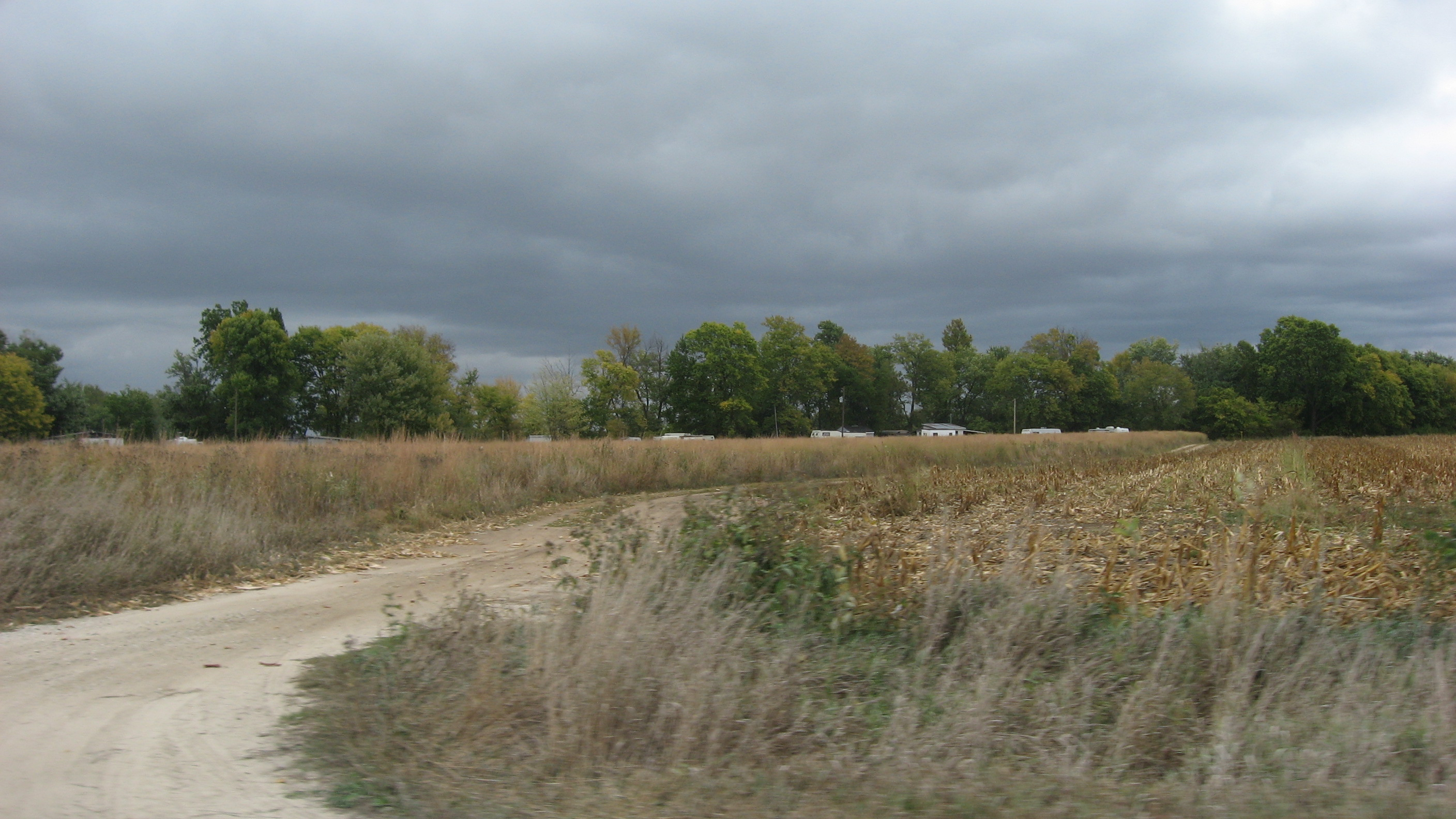
- The site of the former town of Florence near the city of Oakville

- Location within Iowa Location within the United States
- Location: At the site of the now-gone village of Florence
- Nearest city: Oakville, Iowa
- Coordinates: 41°06′29″N 91°06′57″W
- NRHP reference No.: 78001243
- Added to NRHP: December 27, 1978

Florence-Council On The Iowa Site is a former town site and Native American village site located near Oakville, Iowa, United States in Louisa County. The site has been listed on the National Register of Historic Places since 1978.

Florence was a settlement along the Iowa River that existed from 1836 to 1846. Prior to that, it was the village site of the Sauk people and home to Black Hawk and Keokuk, who debated here retaking the tribal lands in Illinois. It was at this place where the followers of Black Hawk rallied before they crossed into Illinois to reclaim their lands, which led to the Black Hawk War of 1832. In the treaty that followed the hostilities, the area was known as "Keokuk's Principal Village." Florence developed after the Native Americans left the area in 1836. There is no record of the village having ever been platted, but it did contain a tavern, at least one retail establishment and a ferry service. A post office was established on July 5, 1839, with John Deihl, a merchant, as postmaster. It was discontinued on February 11, 1846.
