= Wapello Community School District =

Public school district in Wapello, Iowa, united States

Coordinates: 41.182515°N 91.188414°W

Address
- 501 Buchanan Ave. Wapello, Iowa, 52653; United States
- Coordinates: 41.182515, -91.188414

District information
- Type: Public
- Motto: "Educate, Enrich, Empower, Excel: Every Student, Everyday."
- Grades: K-12
- Established: 1868
- Superintendent: Mike Peterson
- Schools: 3
- Budget: $9,260,000 (2020-21)
- NCES District ID: 1929730

Students and staff
- Students: 541 (2022-23)
- Teachers: 46.12 FTE
- Staff: 49.60 FTE
- Student–teacher ratio: 11.73
- Athletic conference: Southeast Iowa Superconference; North Division
- District mascot: Indians (Boys) & Arrows (Girls)
- Colors: Blue and Gold

Other information
- Affiliation(s): (Boys' sports) IHSAA and (Girls' Sports) IGHSAU
- Rivalries: The showdown on 61 with Louisa-Muscatine
- Website: www.wapello.k12.ia.us

The Wapello Community School District, or Wapello Community Schools, is a rural public school district headquartered in Wapello, Iowa. It is mostly within Louisa County, with a smaller area in Des Moines County, and serves the towns of Wapello and Oakville, and the surrounding rural areas.

In 2015, the district entered an agreement with the Morning Sun Community School District to share the services of superintendent Mike Peterson.

== Schools ==
The district operates three schools, all in Wapello:

- Wapello Elementary School
- Wapello Junior High School
- Wapello High School

== Athletics ==
The Indians/Arrows compete in the Southeast Iowa Superconference (North Division), in the following sports:

- Boys' & Girls' Cross country
- Girls' Volleyball
- Boys' & Girls' Wrestling
- Boys' & Girls' Basketball
- Boys' & Girls' Track and field
- Boys' & Girls' Golf
- Boys' & Girls' Soccer (Co-op With Louisa-Muscatine)
- Boys' Baseball
- Girls' Softball

For American Football, the Indians compete in Iowa Class A District 5 (As of 2025).

== See also ==
- List of school districts in Iowa
- List of high schools in Iowa
