= Honey Creek Friends' Meetinghouse =

- U.S. National Register of Historic Places
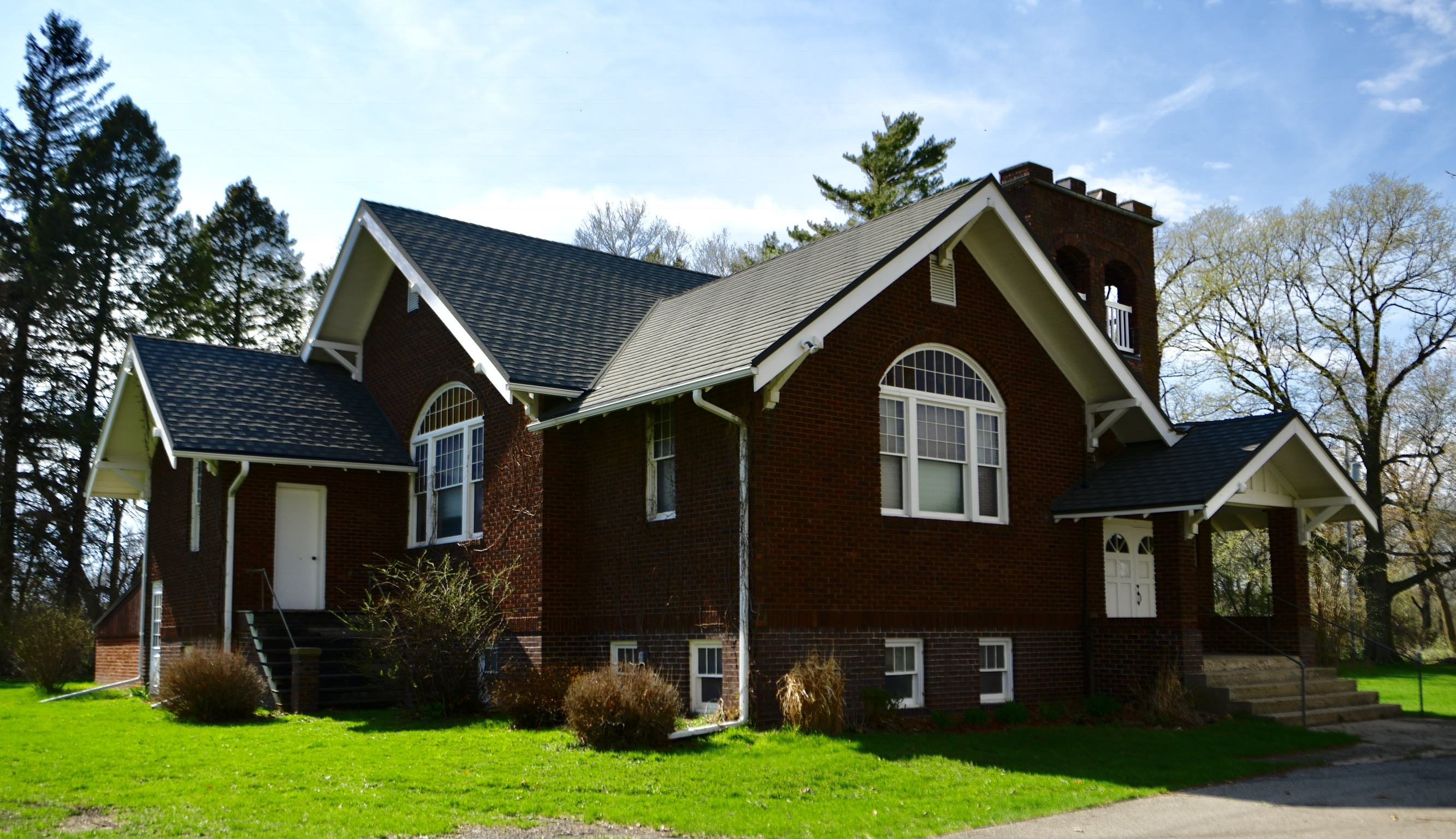

- Location within Iowa Location within the United States
- Location: Southwest of New Providence, Iowa
- Coordinates: 42°15′2″N 93°11′14″W
- Area: approximately 1 acre (0.40 ha)
- Built: 1916
- Architect: Ernie Moon
- Architectural style: Bungalow/Craftsman
- NRHP reference No.: 80001452
- Added to NRHP: February 8, 1980

Honey Creek Friends' Meetinghouse is a historic building located in New Providence, Iowa, United States. It was listed on the National Register of Historic Places in 1980.

== History ==
The Religious Society of Friends, who were originally from Yadkin County, North Carolina, organized the Honey Creek Monthly Meeting in 1852. They were a party of 44 composed of members of the Reece family ranging in ages from 8 weeks to over 70 years. It took two months for the party to reach their destination of Salem, Iowa. They moved on from there to establish the church in New Providence, Iowa. Not one railroad was crossed during the trek. Their first meeting house was a log structure that was built in 1854 and was replaced in 1859 after it had been destroyed by a fire. Various additions were made to the building and served the community until 1916 when they constructed this building. The meetinghouse was constructed by Ernie Moon, a local builder, and church members. Services are no longer held in the building (Reopened February 20, 2022, for weekly 'Unprogrammed' gatherings), which is now owned by the Honey Creek Preservation Group. They maintain the building, sponsor events and maintain records and other information from the church.

== Architecture ==
The meetinghouse is constructed of clay tiles with a brick veneer on the exterior. The building's main gable is oriented on a north-south axis, with a smaller front gable that sits asymmetrically on the east side. It contains the main entrance into the building. Behind the entrance is a short square bell tower with a crenellated parapet and pairs of elliptical arched openings on each side of the bell chamber. There is a secondary entrance on the north side of the building.

Large segmental arched windows light the interior on the north, south and east sides of the building. All of the other window openings on the building are rectilinear. The main entrance consists of two paneled doors. They open into a vestibule and stair hall, as the meeting room sits a few steps above the entrance. The meeting room occupies most of the main level of the building.
