= Morning Sun Community School District =

School district in Iowa, United States

Coordinates: 41.095412°N 91.249609°W

Location
- Morning Sun, Iowa Louisa and Des Moines counties United States
- Coordinates: 41.095412, -91.249609

District information
- Type: Local school district
- Grades: PK-6
- Superintendent: Mike Peterson
- Schools: 1
- Budget: $3,504,000 (2020-21)
- NCES District ID: 1919770

Students and staff
- Students: 124 (2022-23)
- Teachers: 10.51 FTE
- Staff: 13.49 FTE
- Student–teacher ratio: 11.80
- District mascot: Tiger
- Colors: Green and Yellow

Other information
- Website: mscsd.org

The Morning Sun Community School District is a public school district headquartered in Morning Sun, Iowa. The district is mostly in southern Louisa County, with a smaller area in Des Moines County, and serves the town of Morning Sun and the surrounding rural areas.

Mike Peterson, superintendent of Wapello, serves as superintendent.

== Schools ==
The district operates a single elementary school in Stratford:

- Morning Sun Elementary School

Students from Morning Sun attend secondary school at Winfield-Mt. Union or Wapello.
