= Oakville, Iowa =

- City
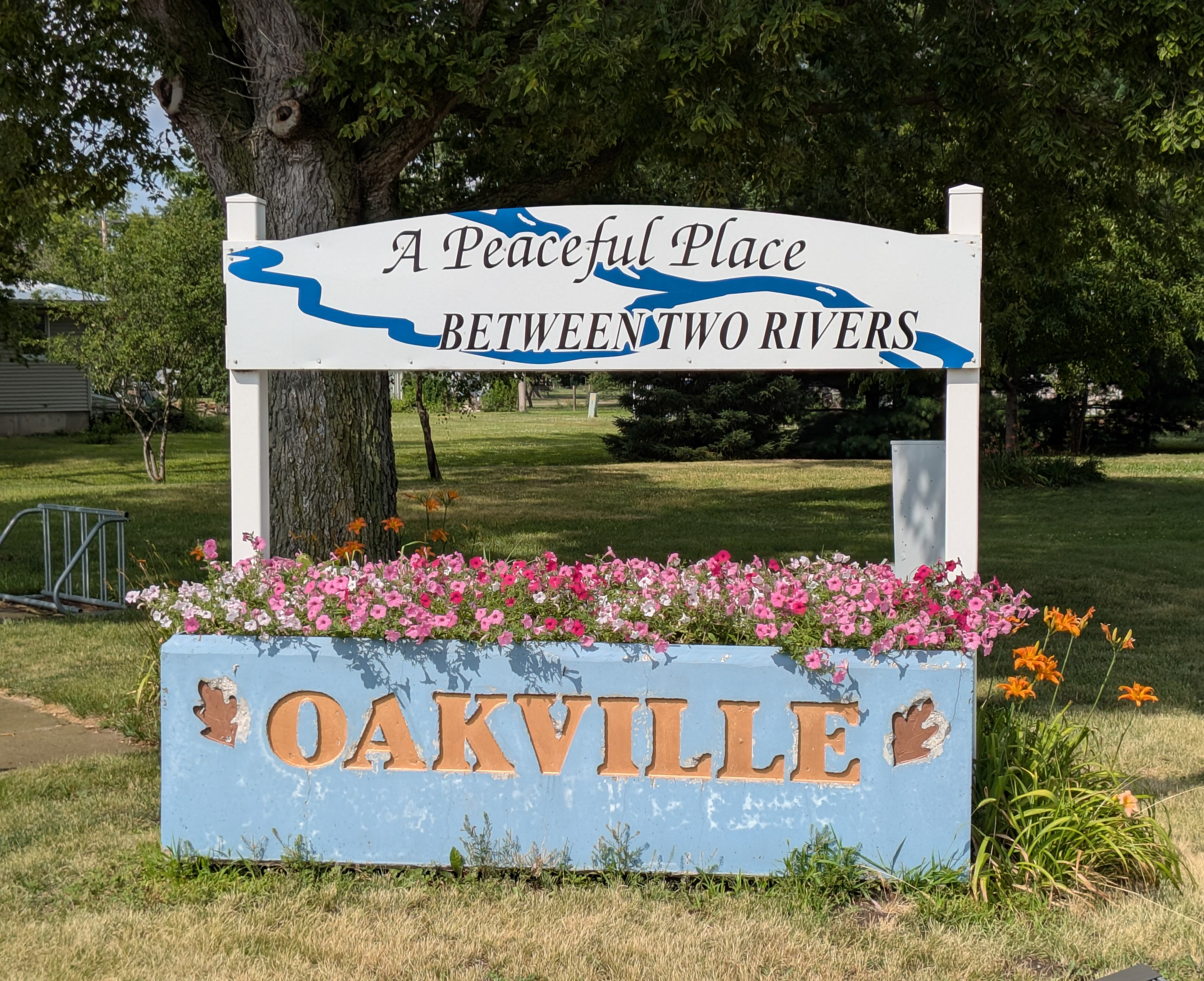
- Oakville's Welcome Sign

- Location of Oakville, Iowa
- Coordinates: 41°05′52″N 91°02′37″W
- Country: United States
- State: Iowa
- County: Louisa

Area
  - Total: 0.42 sq mi (1.09 km^{2})
  - Land: 0.42 sq mi (1.08 km^{2})
  - Water: 0.0039 sq mi (0.01 km^{2})
- Elevation: 541 ft (165 m)

Population (2020)
  - Total: 200
  - Density: 479.3/sq mi (185.07/km^{2})
- Time zone: UTC-6 (Central (CST))
  - Summer (DST): UTC-5 (CDT)
- ZIP code: 52646
- Area code: 319
- FIPS code: 19-58395
- GNIS feature ID: 2395294

Oakville is a city in southeastern Louisa County, Iowa, United States. The population was 200 at the time of the 2020 census. It is part of the Muscatine Micropolitan Statistical Area.

== History ==
Oakville was laid out in 1891.

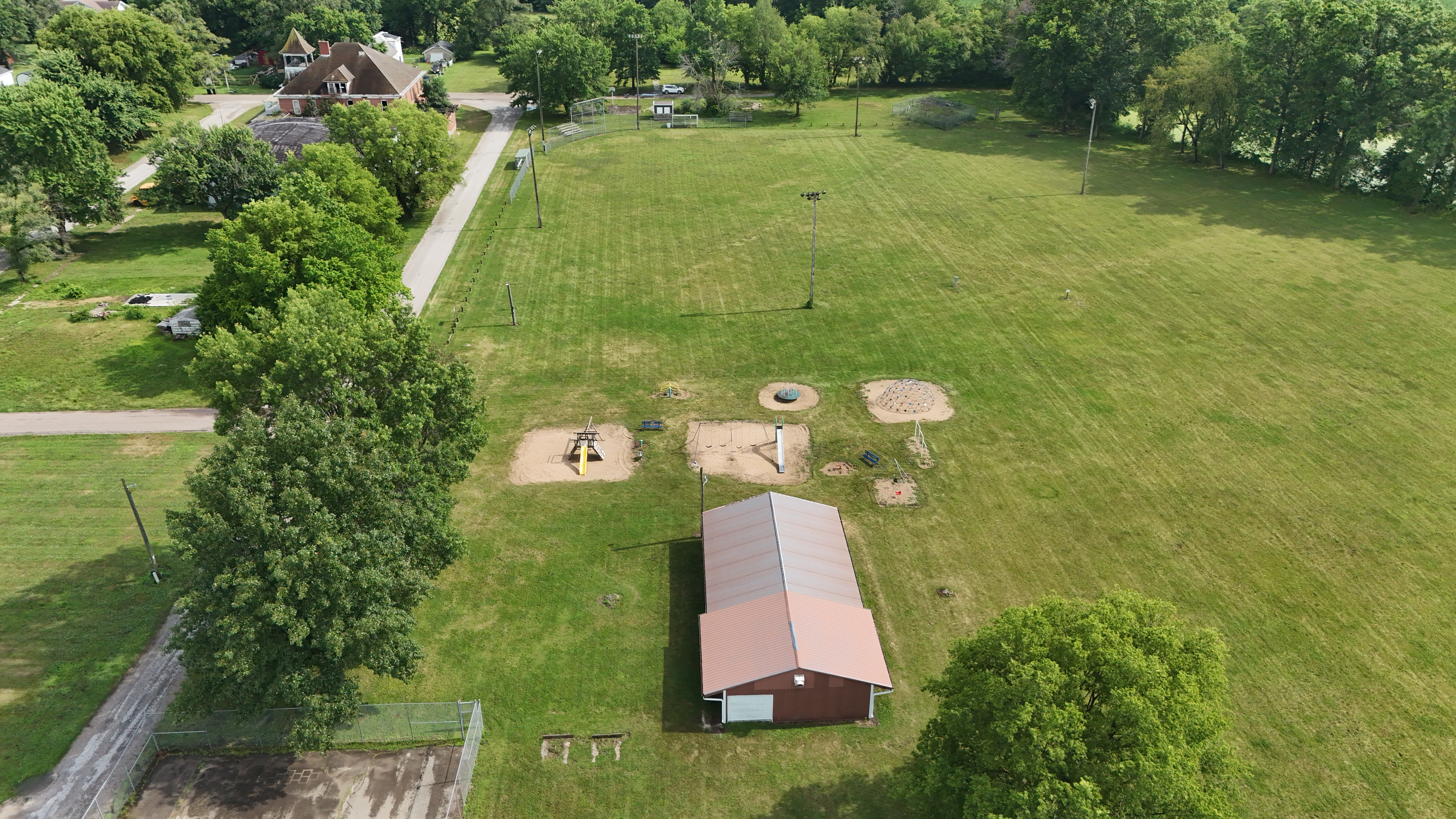
Oakville city park and mini golf course

== Geography ==
Oakville is located just north of Iowa Route X99 and the Iowa River passes about one-half mile to the northwest. The Louisa-Des Moines county line is two miles to the south. Wapello is about six miles to the northwest and Keithsburg, Illinois is across the Mississippi River approximately five mile to the east.

According to the United States Census Bureau, the city has a total area of 0.43 square miles (1.11 km^{2}), of which 0.42 square miles (1.09 km^{2}) is land and 0.01 square miles (0.03 km^{2}) is water.

== Demographics ==
Historical populations
Year	Pop.	±%
1910	389	—
1920	466	+19.8%
1930	389	−16.5%
1940	391	+0.5%
1950	360	−7.9%
1960	346	−3.9%
1970	369	+6.6%
1980	470	+27.4%
1990	442	−6.0%
2000	439	−0.7%
2010	173	−60.6%
2020	200	+15.6%
Source:"U.S. Census website". United States Census Bureau. and Iowa Data Center; Source: U.S. Decennial Census

=== 2020 census ===
As of the census of 2020, there were 200 people, 84 households, and 56 families residing in the city. The population density was 479.3 inhabitants per square mile (185.1/km^{2}). There were 87 housing units at an average density of 208.5 per square mile (80.5/km^{2}). The racial makeup of the city was 92.5% White, 0.5% Black or African American, 0.0% Native American, 0.0% Asian, 0.0% Pacific Islander, 1.0% from other races and 6.0% from two or more races. Hispanic or Latino persons of any race comprised 3.0% of the population.

Of the 84 households, 34.5% of which had children under the age of 18 living with them, 44.0% were married couples living together, 9.5% were cohabitating couples, 28.6% had a female householder with no spouse or partner present and 17.9% had a male householder with no spouse or partner present. 33.3% of all households were non-families. 28.6% of all households were made up of individuals, 9.5% had someone living alone who was 65 years old or older.

The median age in the city was 37.5 years. 27.0% of the residents were under the age of 20; 5.5% were between the ages of 20 and 24; 28.0% were from 25 and 44; 23.0% were from 45 and 64; and 16.5% were 65 years of age or older. The gender makeup of the city was 51.0% male and 49.0% female.

=== 2010 census ===
At the 2010 census there were 173 people in 62 households, including 42 families, in the city. The population density was 411.9 inhabitants per square mile (159.0/km^{2}). There were 95 housing units at an average density of 226.2 per square mile (87.3/km^{2}). The racial makup of the city was 97.7% White, 0.6% from other races, and 1.7% from two or more races. Hispanic or Latino of any race were 2.9%.

Of the 62 households 41.9% had children under the age of 18 living with them, 40.3% were married couples living together, 14.5% had a female householder with no husband present, 12.9% had a male householder with no wife present, and 32.3% were non-families. 29.0% of households were one person and 12.9% were one person aged 65 or older. The average household size was 2.79 and the average family size was 3.36.

The median age was 28.3 years. 37% of residents were under the age of 18; 8.6% were between the ages of 18 and 24; 24.9% were from 25 to 44; 20.3% were from 45 to 64; and 9.2% were 65 or older. The gender makeup of the city was 51.4% male and 48.6% female.

=== 2000 census ===
At the 2000 census there were 439 people in 179 households, including 119 families, in the city. The population density was 1,044.8 inhabitants per square mile (403.4/km^{2}). There were 193 housing units at an average density of 459.3 per square mile (177.3/km^{2}). The racial makup of the city was 99.32% White, 0.46% Asian, and 0.23% from two or more races. Hispanic or Latino of any race were 0.91%.

Of the 179 households 33.0% had children under the age of 18 living with them, 49.2% were married couples living together, 12.3% had a female householder with no husband present, and 33.5% were non-families. 28.5% of households were one person and 12.3% were one person aged 65 or older. The average household size was 2.45 and the average family size was 2.97.

The age distribution was 26.9% under the age of 18, 8.0% from 18 to 24, 28.0% from 25 to 44, 22.6% from 45 to 64, and 14.6% 65 or older. The median age was 34 years. For every 100 females, there were 99.5 males. For every 100 females age 18 and over, there were 89.9 males.

The median household income was $29,018 and the median family income was $32,250. Males had a median income of $31,346 versus $21,389 for females. The per capita income for the city was $13,276. About 3.0% of families and 7.7% of the population were below the poverty line, including 8.8% of those under age 18 and 6.1% of those age 65 or over.

== Education ==
The Wapello Community School District operates area public schools.
