= Washington Junior High School and Jefferson Grade School =

- U.S. National Register of Historic Places
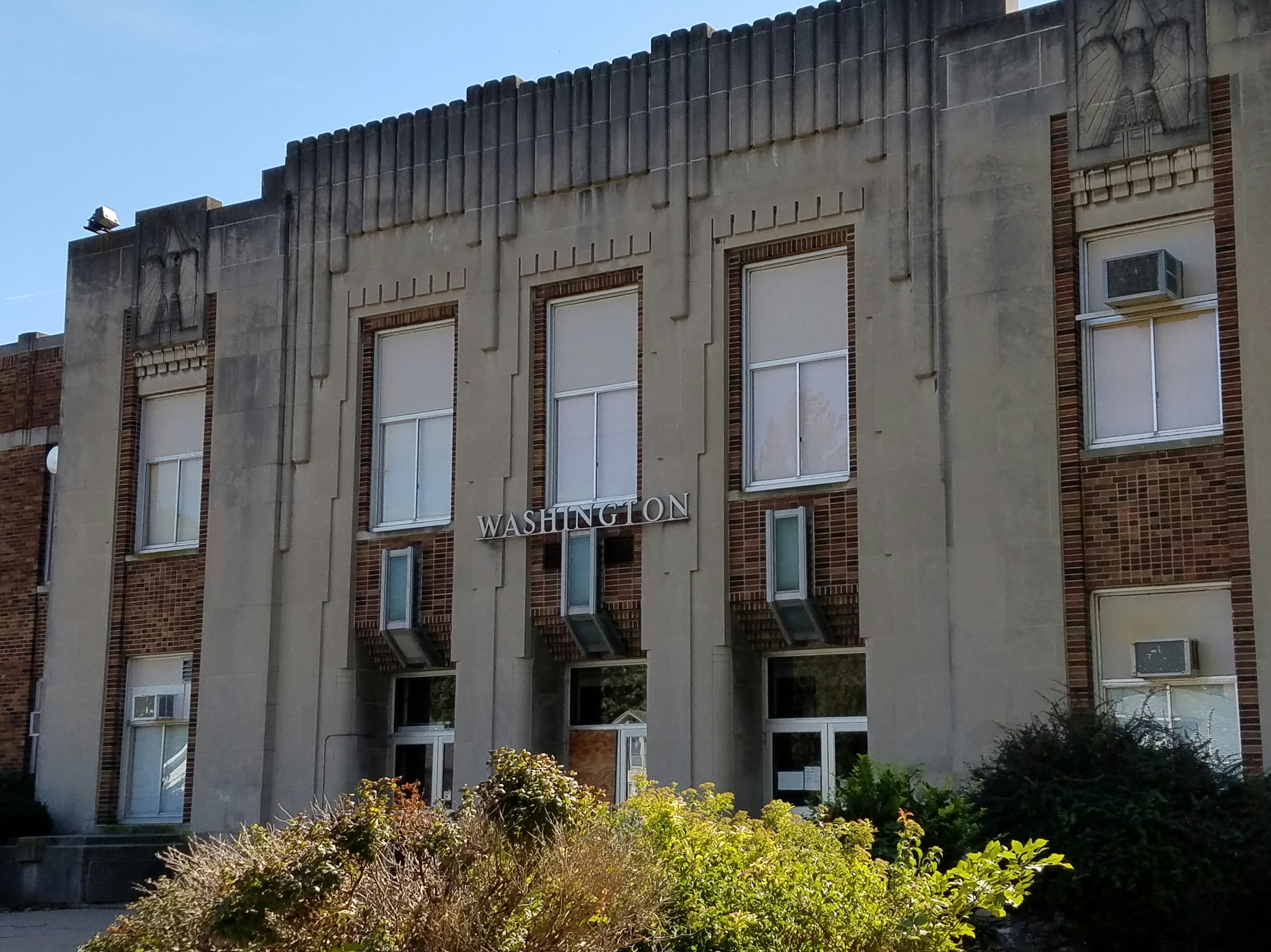

- Location within Iowa Location within the United States
- Location: 751 2nd Ave. S. Clinton, Iowa
- Coordinates: 41°50′27″N 90°11′21″W
- Built: 1933-1935
- Architect: Karl Keffer & Earl E. Jones
- Architectural style: Art Deco
- NRHP reference No.: 15000483
- Added to NRHP: October 21, 2015

Washington Junior High School and Jefferson Grade School is an historic school building located in Clinton, Iowa, United States. Des Moines architects Karl Keffer and Earl E. Jones designed the building in the Art Deco style. A. H. Morrell served as the associate architect. The original portion of the building was constructed from 1933 to 1935 by Ringland-Johnson Company. It is a large, two-story structure with a brick exterior and stone trim and accent panels. The relief of geometric designs at the entry is of particular interest. Additions were added to the rear of the building in 1952 and in 1972. A contemporary Jefferson Elementary School was built on the same property and replaced this school building in 2006. The building was used as a middle school until late 2014 when a new Clinton Middle School was completed. The former school building was listed on the National Register of Historic Places in 2015. Plans call for the building to be converted into senior apartments.
