= Masters Building =

- U.S. National Register of Historic Places
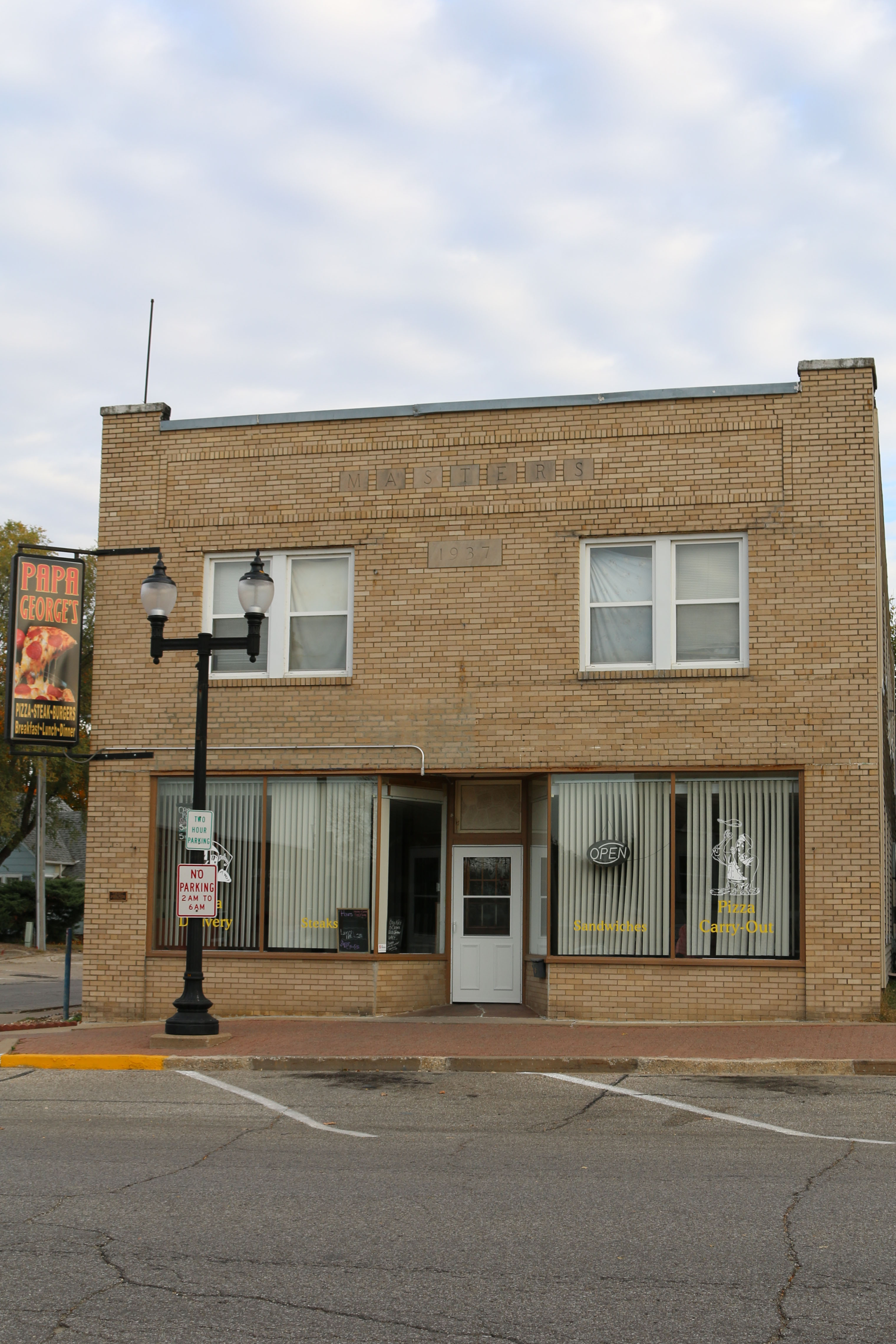

- Location within Iowa Location within the United States
- Location: 221 W. Monroe St., Mount Pleasant, Iowa
- Coordinates: 40°58′01.2″N 91°33′20.8″W
- Area: less than one acre
- Built: 1937
- Architectural style: Late 19th and Early 20th Century American Movements
- MPS: Mount Pleasant MPS
- NRHP reference No.: 91001121
- Added to NRHP: September 6, 1991

The Masters Building is a historic building located in Mount Pleasant, Iowa, United States. Completed in 1937, this two-story, brick structure is an adaptation of the commercial Art Deco and Art Moderne styles. The decorative elements are found in the brick patterning and cast concrete panels on the facade. There are three other buildings on this same block that were built about the same time and use the same decorative techniques, with the Masters Building being the best example. This area was an expansion of the central business district after the construction of city hall across the street in 1936. A plumbing business, for which this building was constructed, was located on the first floor. There are three apartments on the second floor. The building was listed on the National Register of Historic Places in 1991.
