= New Providence, Iowa =

- City
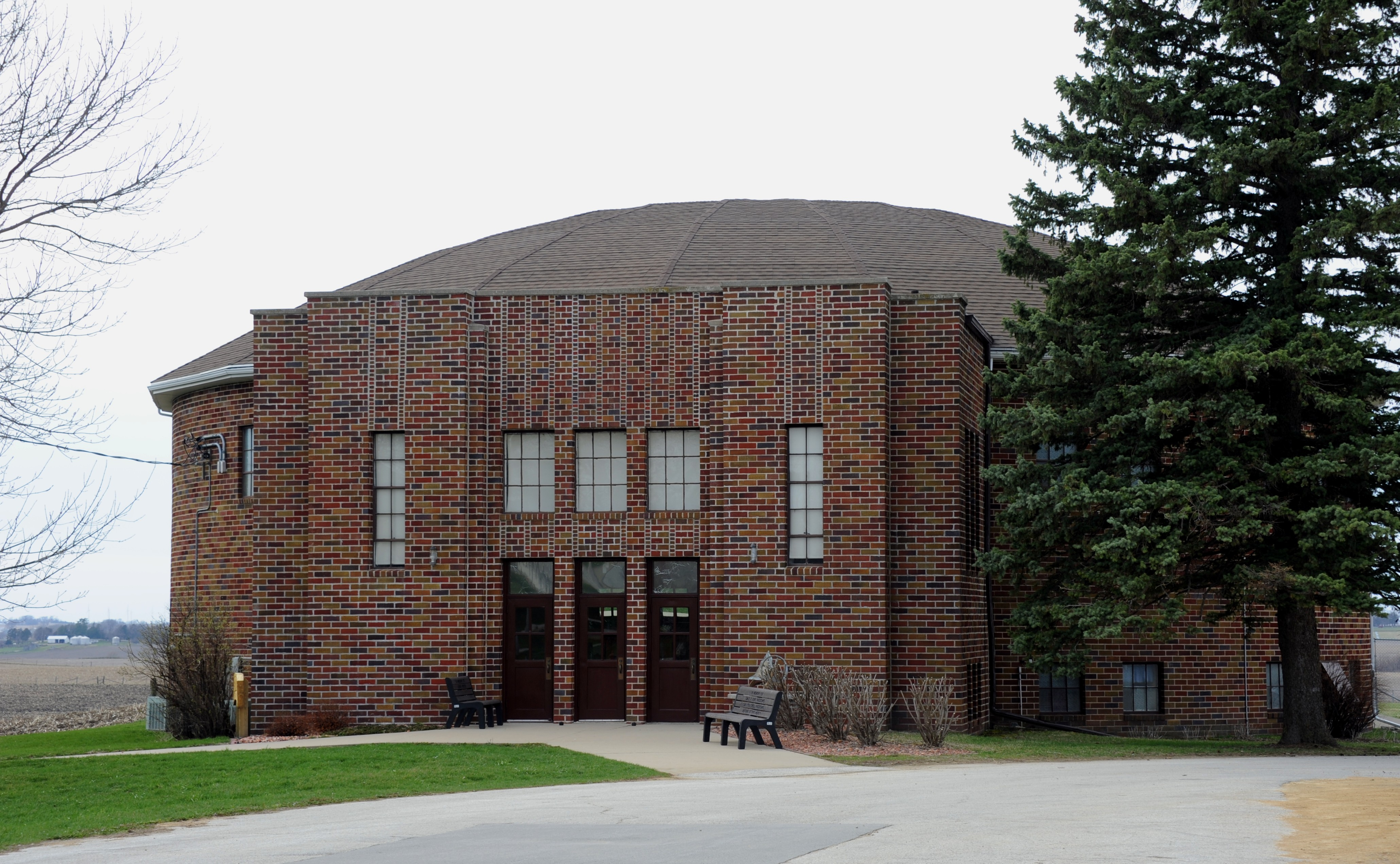
- New Providence Roundhouse

- Location of New Providence, Iowa
- Coordinates: 42°16′53″N 93°10′18″W
- Country: USA
- State: Iowa
- County: Hardin

Area
  - Total: 1.00 sq mi (2.59 km^{2})
  - Land: 1.00 sq mi (2.59 km^{2})
  - Water: 0 sq mi (0.00 km^{2})
- Elevation: 1,129 ft (344 m)

Population (2020)
  - Total: 236
  - Density: 236.2/sq mi (91.19/km^{2})
- Time zone: UTC-6 (Central (CST))
  - Summer (DST): UTC-5 (CDT)
- ZIP code: 50206
- Area code: 641
- FIPS code: 19-56415
- GNIS feature ID: 2395212
- Website: www.newprovidenceiowa.com

New Providence is a small city in Hardin County, Iowa, United States. The population was 236 at the time of the 2020 census.

== History ==
New Providence was laid out in 1855.

New Providence was struck by a tornado in 1860 and much of its business district burned in a fire in 1910.

== Geography ==
According to the United States Census Bureau, the city has a total area of 1.01 square miles (2.62 km^{2}), all land.

== Demographics ==
Historical populations
Year	Pop.	±%
1880	146	—
1890	155	+6.2%
1900	268	+72.9%
1910	246	−8.2%
1920	255	+3.7%
1930	262	+2.7%
1940	236	−9.9%
1950	212	−10.2%
1960	206	−2.8%
1970	208	+1.0%
1980	249	+19.7%
1990	240	−3.6%
2000	227	−5.4%
2010	228	+0.4%
2020	236	+3.5%
Source:"U.S. Census website". United States Census Bureau. and Iowa Data Center; Source: U.S. Decennial Census

=== 2020 census ===
As of the census of 2020, there were 236 people, 96 households, and 65 families residing in the city. The population density was 236.2 inhabitants per square mile (91.2/km^{2}). There were 102 housing units at an average density of 102.1 per square mile (39.4/km^{2}). The racial makeup of the city was 93.2% White, 0.4% Black or African American, 0.0% Native American, 0.0% Asian, 0.0% Pacific Islander, 3.8% from other races and 2.5% from two or more races. Hispanic or Latino persons of any race comprised 2.5% of the population.

Of the 96 households, 31.2% of which had children under the age of 18 living with them, 52.1% were married couples living together, 10.4% were cohabitating couples, 17.7% had a female householder with no spouse or partner present and 19.8% had a male householder with no spouse or partner present. 32.3% of all households were non-families. 26.0% of all households were made up of individuals, 9.4% had someone living alone who was 65 years old or older.

The median age in the city was 35.3 years. 29.2% of the residents were under the age of 20; 3.4% were between the ages of 20 and 24; 25.4% were from 25 and 44; 22.5% were from 45 and 64; and 19.5% were 65 years of age or older. The gender makeup of the city was 54.7% male and 45.3% female.

=== 2010 census ===
As of the census of 2010, there were 228 people, 91 households, and 60 families living in the city. The population density was 225.7 inhabitants per square mile (87.1/km^{2}). There were 106 housing units at an average density of 105.0 per square mile (40.5/km^{2}). The racial makeup of the city was 96.1% White, 0.9% African American, 0.9% Native American, 0.4% from other races, and 1.8% from two or more races. Hispanic or Latino of any race were 1.8% of the population.

There were 91 households, of which 30.8% had children under the age of 18 living with them, 53.8% were married couples living together, 6.6% had a female householder with no husband present, 5.5% had a male householder with no wife present, and 34.1% were non-families. 27.5% of all households were made up of individuals, and 9.9% had someone living alone who was 65 years of age or older. The average household size was 2.51 and the average family size was 3.02.

The median age in the city was 38.7 years. 28.1% of residents were under the age of 18; 6.6% were between the ages of 18 and 24; 23.2% were from 25 to 44; 29.5% were from 45 to 64; and 12.7% were 65 years of age or older. The gender makeup of the city was 51.3% male and 48.7% female.

=== 2000 census ===
As of the census of 2000, there were 227 people, 97 households, and 65 families living in the small city. The population density was 226.3 inhabitants per square mile (87.4/km^{2}). There were 107 housing units at an average density of 106.7 per square mile (41.2/km^{2}). The racial makeup of the city was 97.36% White, 2.64% from other races. Hispanic or Latino of any race were 2.64% of the population.

There were 97 households, out of which 27.8% had children under the age of 18 living with them, 58.8% were married couples living together, 9.3% had a female householder with no husband present, and 32.0% were non-families. 28.9% of all households were made up of individuals, and 11.3% had someone living alone who was 65 years of age or older. The average household size was 2.34 and the average family size was 2.91.

In the city, the population was spread out, with 25.6% under the age of 18, 9.7×% from 18 to 24, 23.3% from 25 to 44, 24.7% from 45 to 64, and 16.7% who were 65 years of age or older. The median age was 38 years. For every 100 females, there were 106.4 males. For every 100 females age 18 and over, there were 96.5 males.

The median income for a household in the city was $39,583, and the median income for a family was $47,708. Males had a median income of $27,000 versus $20,625 for females. The per capita income for the city was $18,514. About 7.7% of families and 6.8% of the population were below the poverty line, including 4.7% of those under the age of eighteen and none of those 65 or over.

== Education ==
New Providence lies within the Eldora–New Providence Community School District, which formed on July 1, 1980, with the merger of the Eldora and New Providence school districts. As of 2019, it has a grade-sharing arrangement with Hubbard–Radcliffe Community School District and operates as "South Hardin Schools".

== Water tower disaster ==
In July 2000, a water tower under construction in New Providence collapsed due to a falling tower crane. One worker was killed and two others injured. The accident is featured on the Discovery Channel series Destroyed in Seconds.

== See also ==
- Honey Creek Friends' Meetinghouse, listed on the National Register of Historic Places
