= Bruce's Snowball Market No. 1 Addition =

- U.S. National Register of Historic Places
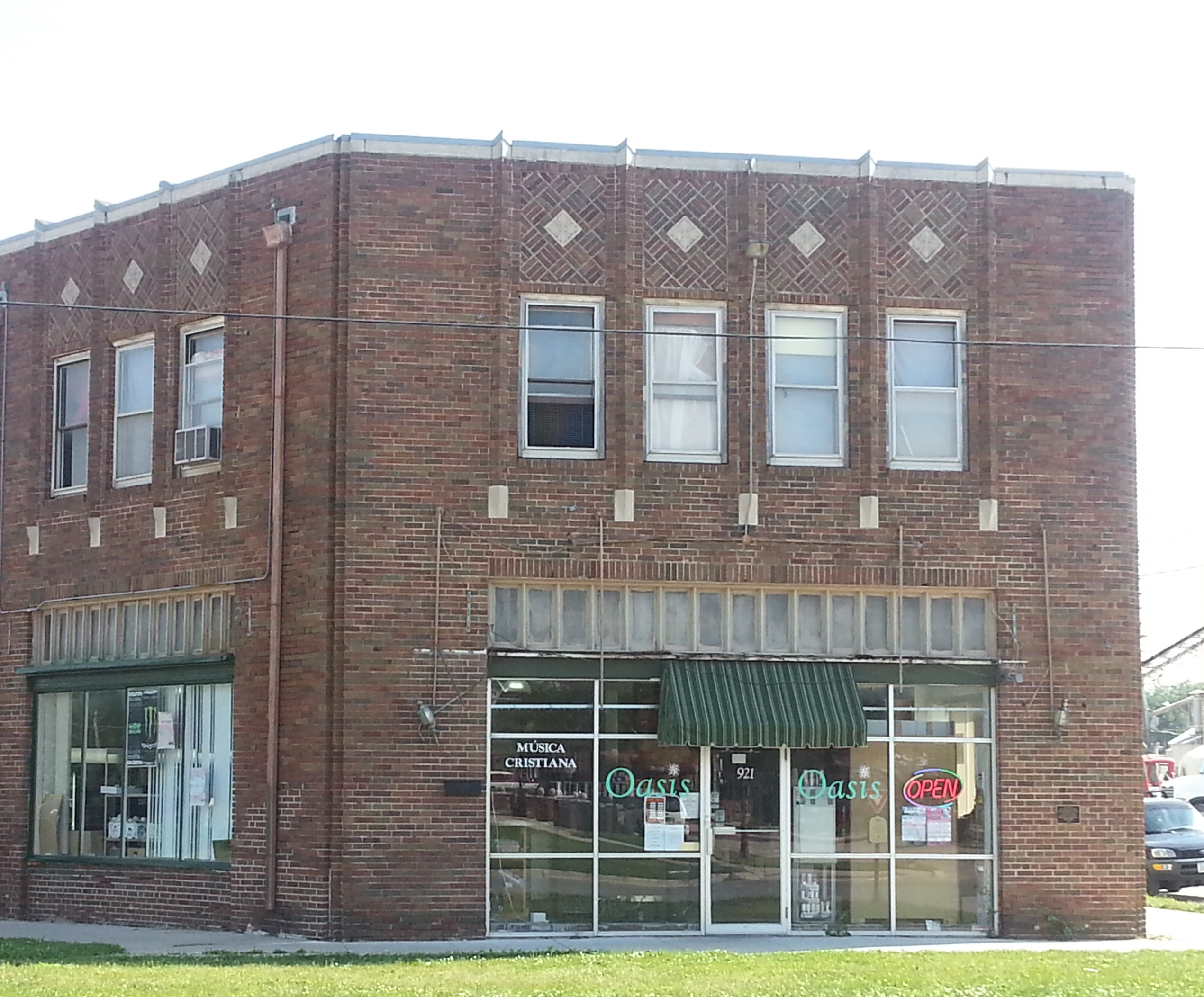

- Location within Iowa Location within the United States
- Location: 921 Railroad St. Perry, Iowa
- Coordinates: 41°50′14″N 94°06′17″W
- Area: less than one acre
- Built: 1930
- Architectural style: Art Deco
- MPS: Downtown Perry, Iowa MPS
- NRHP reference No.: 00001004
- Added to NRHP: September 8, 2000

Bruce's Snowball Market No. 1 Addition is a historic building located in Perry, Iowa, United States. The two-story brick structure with Art Deco styling was built in 1930. It was an addition to a building, non-extant, that was built in 1922 on the edge of the downtown area. It is an example of a grocery store suited to people who own automobiles and could drive to acquire goods and services. The building follows an irregular plan that conforms to the irregularly shaped site. It is also the terminus of a significant urban view in town. The structure features brickwork and cast concrete trim in chevron patterns there were popular in Art Deco decor. It was added to the National Register of Historic Places in 2000.
