= The Avery Theater =

- U.S. National Register of Historic Places
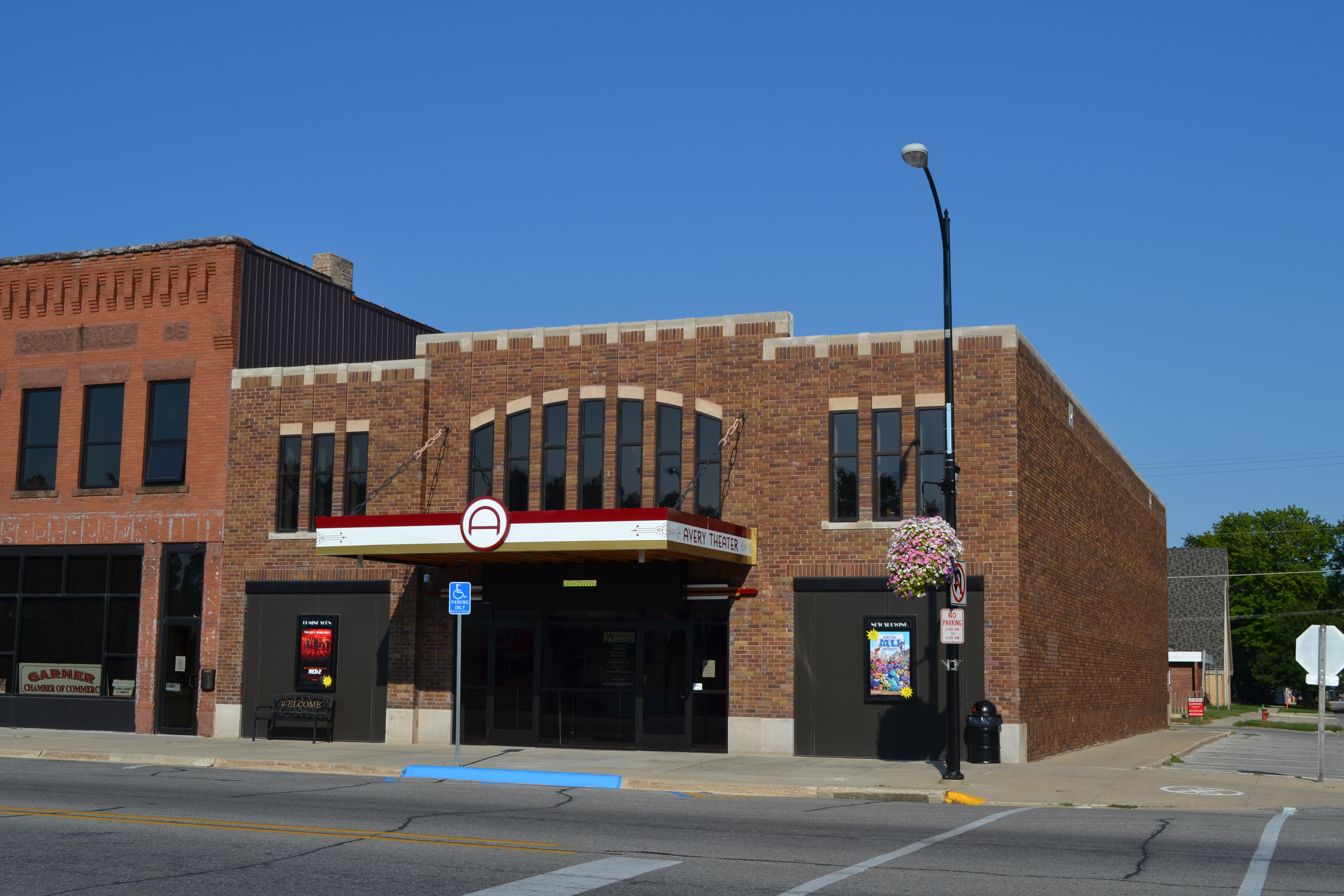

- Location within Iowa Location within the United States
- Location: 495 State St. Garner, Iowa
- Coordinates: 43°06′02″N 93°36′06″W
- Area: less than one acre
- Built: 1931
- Architectural style: Art Deco
- NRHP reference No.: 08001043
- Added to NRHP: November 12, 2008

The Avery Theater is a historic building located in Garner, Iowa, United States. Built from 1930 to 1931, this was the only theater in town built specifically to show movies with sound. It was built by an independent operator who was not affiliated with a studio or a theater chain. The Art Deco structure was designed by Minnesota architect Henry E. Waldron. In addition to playing movies the theater also hosted a variety of events supporting local civic and social groups. The interior was gutted of its theater features in 1970, and it became Erickson's Pharmacy. It became Tammy's Pharmacy around 2003 after Tammy Abbas bought it. The building was listed on the National Register of Historic Places in 2008. From 2010 to 2013 the building was renovated back into a theater, and it reopened as a movie theater in August 2013.
