= Badgerow Building =

- U.S. National Register of Historic Places
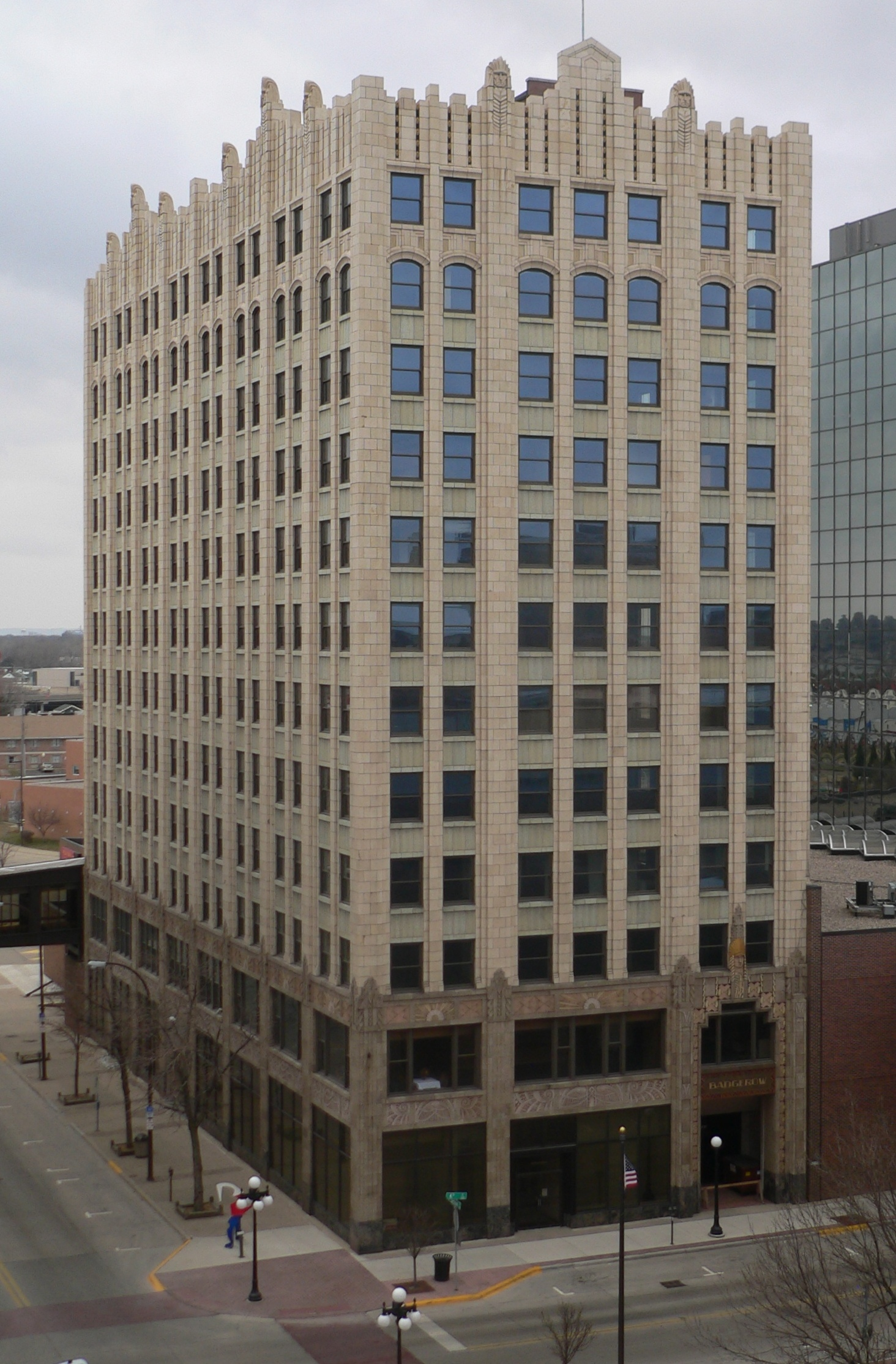
- Badgerow Building, seen from the northeast.

- Location within Iowa Location within the United States
- Location: 622 4th St. Sioux City, Iowa
- Coordinates: 42°29′37.9″N 96°24′08.1″W
- Built: 1933
- Architect: K. E. Westerlind
- Architectural style: Art Deco
- NRHP reference No.: 82002646
- Added to NRHP: March 24, 1982

The Badgerow Building is a historic structure located in downtown Sioux City, Iowa, United States. The building is twelve stories tall and rises 169 feet (52 m) above the ground. It was the tallest building in Sioux City for many years. It was listed on the National Register of Historic Places in 1982. The Badgerow Building was voted one of the 50 Most Significant Iowa Buildings of the 20th Century by the Iowa Chapter of the American Institute of Architects. It was one of five buildings that represented the 1930s.

== Architecture ==
The building was designed by Sioux City architectural firm of K. E. Westerlind, and was completed in 1933 in the Art Deco style. The facade is composed of terra cotta and features vertical piers, bronze ornamentation, and windows that are highlighted by the geometric ornamentation. A head of a Native American is a recurring theme in the ornamentation. The interior features a lobby with walls of black Belgian marble and pink Tennessee marble, and terrazzo floors.
