= Spencer High School and Auditorium =

- U.S. National Register of Historic Places
- Location within Iowa Location within the United States
- Location: 104 E. 4th St. Spencer, Iowa
- Coordinates: 43°08′28″N 95°08′32.9″W
- Area: 1.5 acres (0.61 ha)
- Built: 1914, 1937
- Built by: C. E. Wierschke
- Architect: John D. Chubb; Keffer & Jones
- Architectural style: Classical Revival; Art Deco
- NRHP reference No.: 10000002
- Added to NRHP: February 12, 2010

Spencer High School and Auditorium, also known as Spencer Middle School and Auditorium, is a historic building in Spencer, Iowa, United States. The building was listed on the National Register of Historic Places in 2010.

== History ==
=== Spencer High School ===
The school building was completed in 1914. Designed by Chicago architect John D. Chubb, it is a three-story Neoclassical structure with a flat roof. It features slightly projecting bays and prominent belt courses that encircle the building. The belt course that runs below the second-floor windows divides the different brick that was used for the first floor from that used on the upper two floors. When it was constructed, the building was symmetrical in design, but when the auditorium was added in 1937 it threw off the symmetry. This was the first high school-only building in Spencer. Previously, the high school grades were on the first floor of the town's only school building, and the lower grades were on the upper floor. This building was built when A. H. Avery was the superintendent of the Spencer school district. Avery had introduced a five-year high school program that included vocational training as many students would not be going on to college. He advocated for the new school building that included vocational-specific classrooms.

=== Auditorium ===
The auditorium was designed by the Des Moines architectural firm of Keffer & Jones. The three-story Art Deco structure was completed for $132,000. Financing for its construction came from three sources: $57,000 came from Public Works Administration funds, $70,000 from a local bond referendum, and $5,000 from the local school district. The addition contained additional classroom space and a 1,200-seat auditorium that served the high school and the needs of the local community. The present gymnasium was added to the building in 1967.

A new high school was built in 1960, but it did not include an auditorium. The old high school became a junior high school and then a middle school, but the high school continued to use the old auditorium until 2016. In 2010 the Spencer Area Activity Center relocated to the first floor of the high school building, and the upper two floors were converted into 16 apartments by Community Housing Initiative.
