= St. Olaf Auditorium =

- U.S. National Register of Historic Places
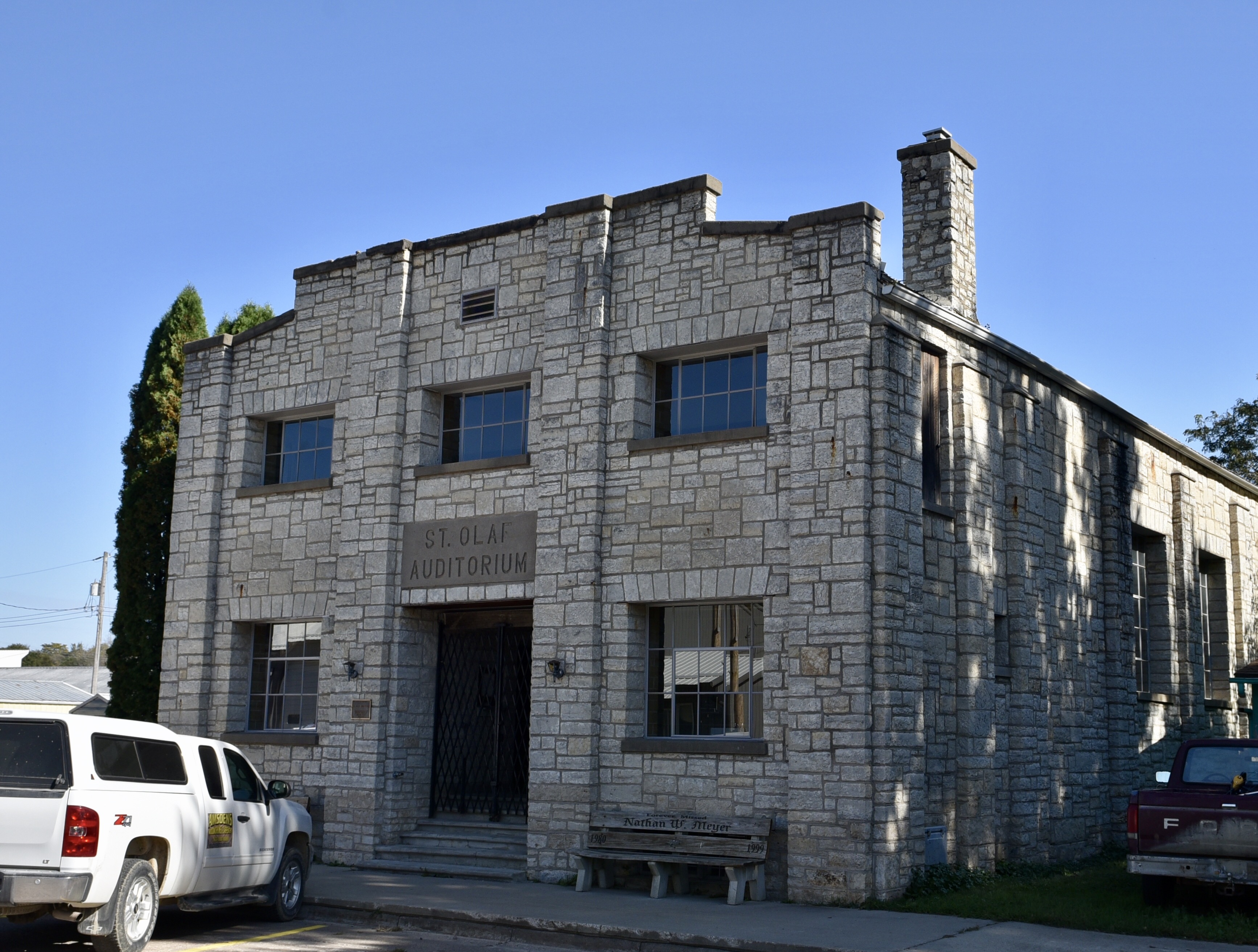

- Location within Iowa Location within the United States
- Location: 118 S. Main St. St. Olaf, Iowa
- Coordinates: 42°55′39.3″N 91°23′10.7″W
- Built: 1939
- Architectural style: PWA Moderne
- NRHP reference No.: 94001446
- Added to NRHP: December 9, 1994

St. Olaf Auditorium, also known as the St. Olaf Opera House and Auditorium, is a historic building located in St. Olaf, Iowa, United States. The city was able to complete the auditorium in 1939 with the assistance of the Public Works Administration (PWA) and labor provided under the aegis of the Works Progress Administration (WPA). Both are New Deal programs that sought to relieve the economic effects of the Great Depression. The building is a two-story structure composed of native rubble limestone that follows the PWA Moderne style. It has served as a community center that has hosted a variety of social activities, including recreational, athletic, cultural, educational, and civic functions. The auditorium was used occasionally for vaudeville and minstrel shows. It was listed on the National Register of Historic Places in 1994.
