= Reeve Electric Association Plant =

- U.S. National Register of Historic Places
- U.S. National Historic Landmark
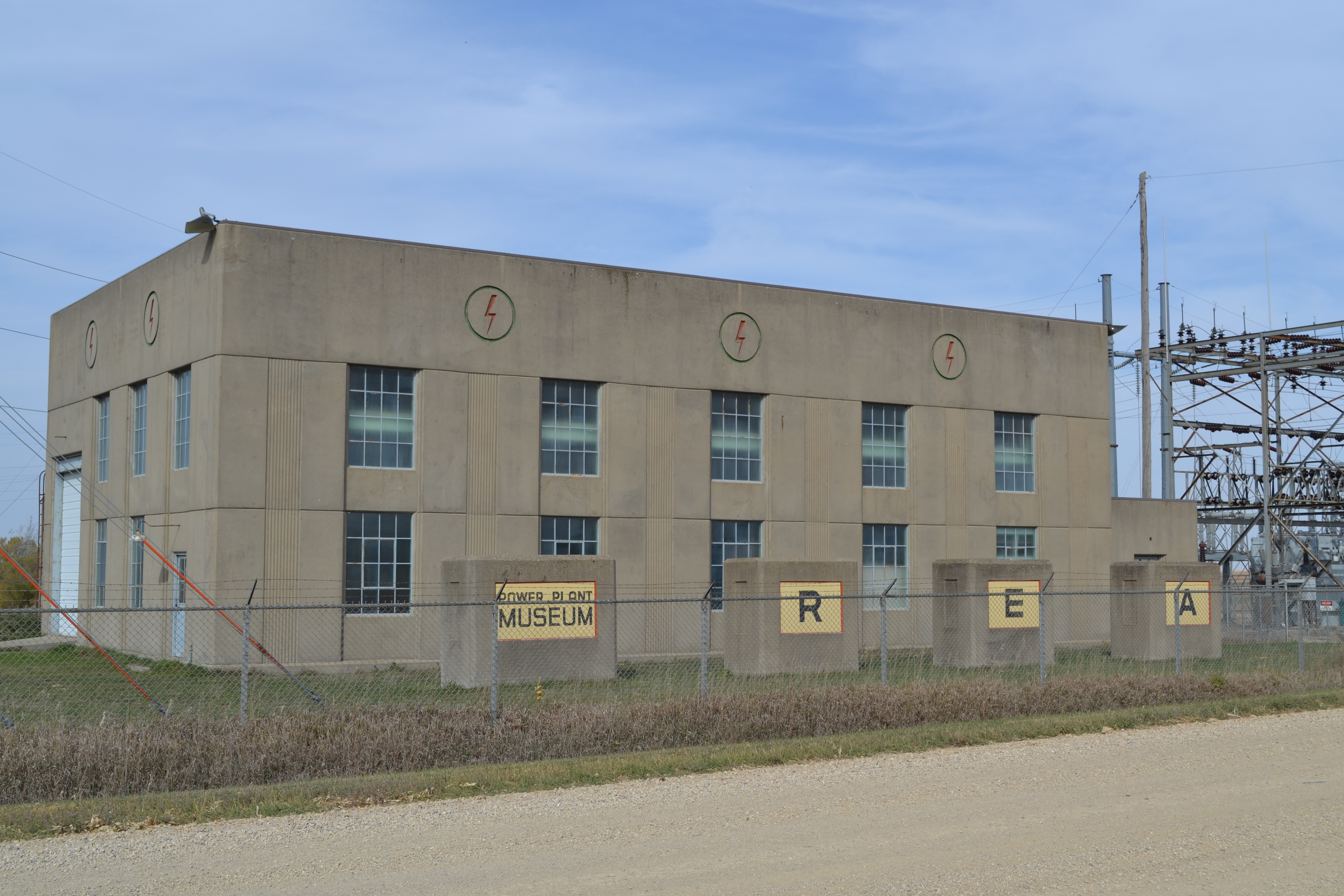

- Location within Iowa Location within the United States
- Location: Rural Route 1 southwest of Hampton, Iowa
- Coordinates: 42°41′14″N 93°13′58″W
- NRHP reference No.: 89002307

Significant dates
- Added to NRHP: April 6, 1990
- Designated NHL: December 13, 2024

The Reeve Electric Association Plant, now known as the REA Power Plant Museum, is a historic structure located near Hampton, Iowa, United States. In the 1930s only 10% of rural homes and farms in the United States had electricity. The first mention of rural electrification in Hampton came in March 1936.

Are you interested in getting a high line by your farm to enable you to have electricity on your farm? The federal government has made arrangements to finance this program for all interested farmers. To secure this aid we must have enough farmers in the county who are interested to make the construction of the line practical and to organize a cooperative to carry on the work. To get some idea of the amount of interest in this project we would like to have each farmer who would like to see this work started send us a card telling us the location of his farm and if possible the names of any neighbors who are interested. As soon the weather and roads permit we will have a series of meetings at which time we will have a representative of the federal government present to discuss the program with you.

— Manning Howell, announcement for the American Farm Bureau in the Hampton, Iowa Chronicle

It was the first farmer-owned power plant in the United States to receive an REA grant in 1937 and in 1938 it was the second to go on-line. There were four generators powered by diesel engines when the plant was in full production. In 1988 the building was given to the Franklin County Historical Society. It opened a rural and electrical museum in the former plant in 1990. The same year it was listed on the National Register of Historic Places. It was designated a National Historic Landmark in 2024.
