= New Providence School Gymnasium =

- U.S. National Register of Historic Places
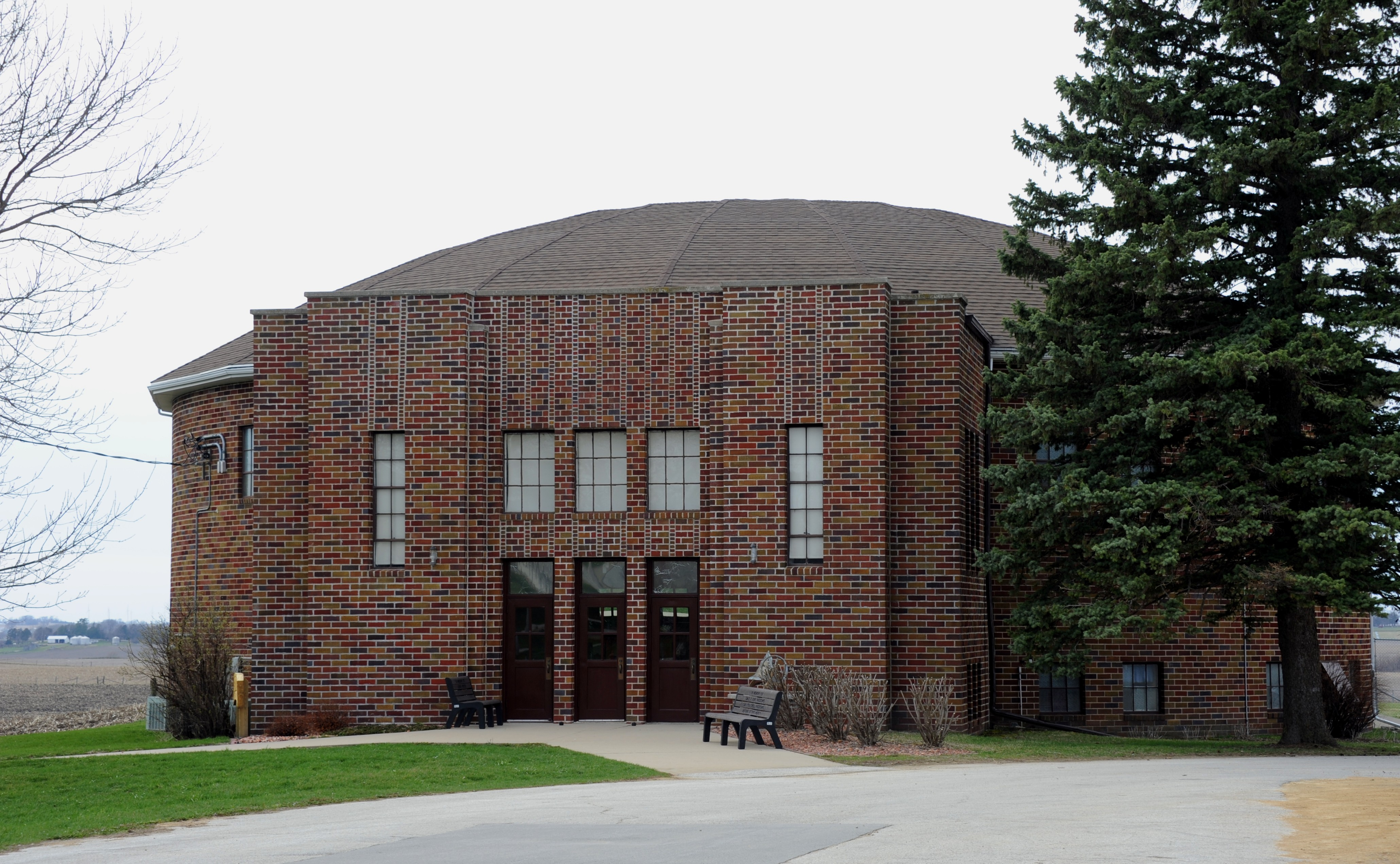

- Location within Iowa Location within the United States
- Location: 106 N. Main St. New Providence, Iowa
- Coordinates: 42°17′06.5″N 93°10′21.8″W
- Area: less than one acre
- Built: 1936
- Built by: J.E. Lovejoy Construction Co.
- Architect: Keffer-Jones Architects
- Architectural style: Moderne
- NRHP reference No.: 96000698
- Added to NRHP: October 22, 1996

The New Providence School Gymnasium, also known as the New Providence Roundhouse, is a historic building located in New Providence, Iowa, United States. The gym was built between 1935 and 1936 as a Public Works Administration (PWA) project. It was one of 32 PWA school buildings designed by the Des Moines architectural firm of Keffer-Jones, and built by J.E. Lovejoy Construction Company, also of Des Moines. The most notable feature of the building is that it is round, and it is believed that it is the first round building that was built specifically as a gymnasium in the state of Iowa. The building hosted many basketball tournaments, and was used for graduation exercises, sporting, musical, dramatic, and community events. It was part of the local school for 50 years, and it is now used as a community center. The building was listed on the National Register of Historic Places in 1996.
