= St. Olaf, Iowa =

- City
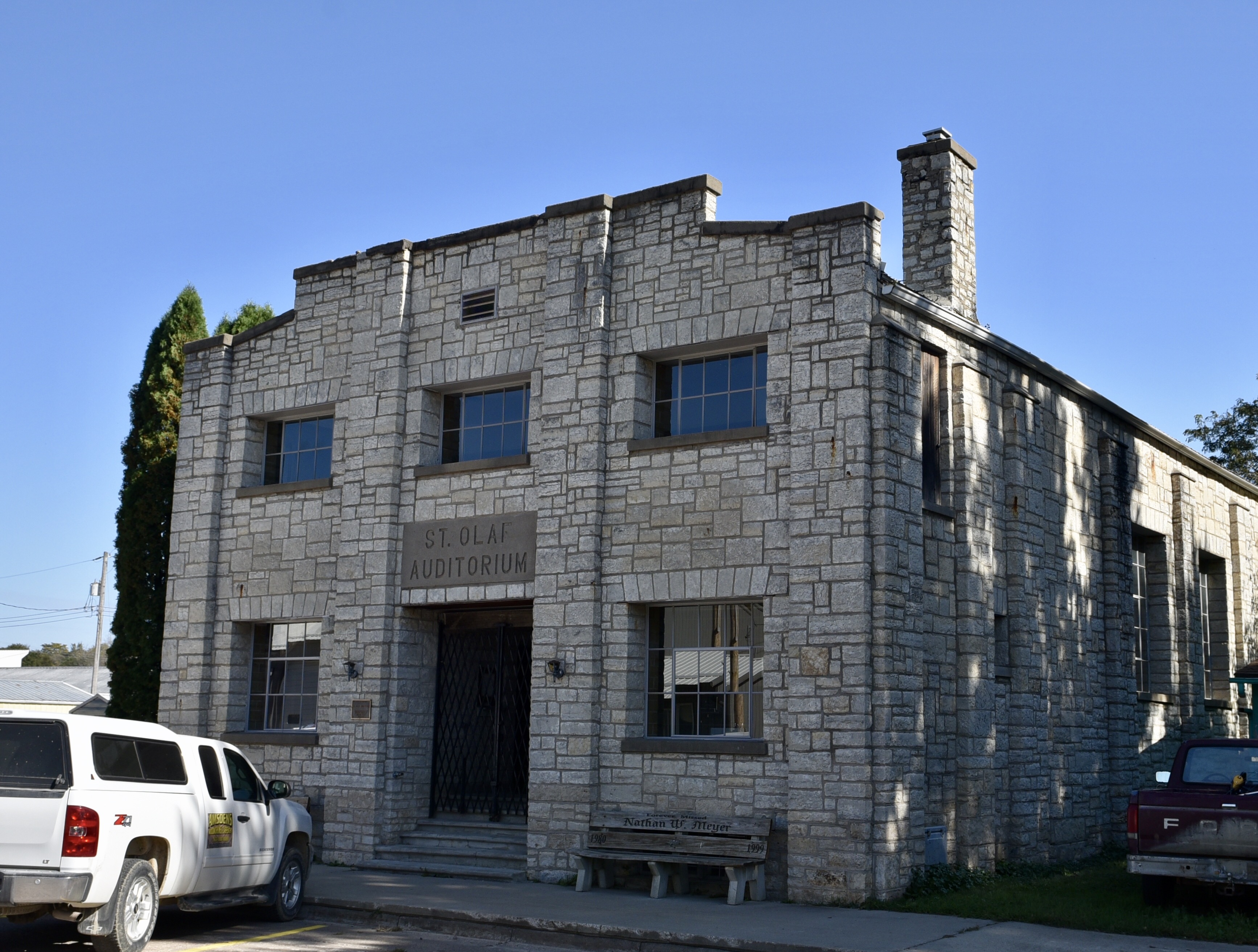
- St. Olaf Auditorium

- Location of St. Olaf, Iowa
- Coordinates: 42°55′37″N 91°23′16″W
- Country: United States
- State: Iowa
- County: Clayton
- Established: 1872

Area
  - Total: 0.24 sq mi (0.62 km^{2})
  - Land: 0.24 sq mi (0.62 km^{2})
  - Water: 0 sq mi (0.00 km^{2})
- Elevation: 866 ft (264 m)

Population (2020)
  - Total: 106
  - Density: 440/sq mi (169.7/km^{2})
- Time zone: UTC-6 (Central (CST))
  - Summer (DST): UTC-5 (CDT)
- ZIP code: 52072
- Area code: 563
- FIPS code: 19-70140
- GNIS feature ID: 2396510

St. Olaf is a city in Clayton County, Iowa, United States. The population was 106 at the time of the 2020 census, down from 136 in 2000.

== History ==
St. Olaf was founded in 1872 and was incorporated as a town in 1900.

== Geography ==
According to the United States Census Bureau, the city has a total area of 0.24 square miles (0.62 km^{2}), all land.

== Demographics ==
Historical populations
Year	Pop.	±%
1880	50	—
1890	77	+54.0%
1900	124	+61.0%
1910	170	+37.1%
1920	149	−12.4%
1930	174	+16.8%
1940	191	+9.8%
1950	158	−17.3%
1960	169	+7.0%
1970	140	−17.2%
1980	138	−1.4%
1990	125	−9.4%
2000	136	+8.8%
2010	108	−20.6%
2020	106	−1.9%
Source:"U.S. Census website". United States Census Bureau. and Iowa Data Center; Source: U.S. Decennial Census

=== 2020 census ===
As of the census of 2020, there were 106 people, 43 households, and 31 families residing in the city. The population density was 439.5 inhabitants per square mile (169.7/km^{2}). There were 47 housing units at an average density of 194.9 per square mile (75.2/km^{2}). The racial makeup of the city was 96.2% White, 0.0% Black or African American, 0.0% Native American, 0.0% Asian, 0.0% Pacific Islander, 0.9% from other races and 2.8% from two or more races. Hispanic or Latino persons of any race comprised 1.9% of the population.

Of the 43 households, 39.5% of which had children under the age of 18 living with them, 58.1% were married couples living together, 7.0% were cohabitating couples, 16.3% had a female householder with no spouse or partner present and 18.6% had a male householder with no spouse or partner present. 27.9% of all households were non-families. 18.6% of all households were made up of individuals, 9.3% had someone living alone who was 65 years old or older.

The median age in the city was 45.5 years. 23.6% of the residents were under the age of 20; 3.8% were between the ages of 20 and 24; 20.8% were from 25 and 44; 36.8% were from 45 and 64; and 15.1% were 65 years of age or older. The gender makeup of the city was 49.1% male and 50.9% female.

=== 2010 census ===
As of the census of 2010, there were 108 people, 43 households, and 34 families living in the city. The population density was 450.0 inhabitants per square mile (173.7/km^{2}). There were 48 housing units at an average density of 200.0 per square mile (77.2/km^{2}). The racial makeup of the city was 100.0% White.

There were 43 households, of which 27.9% had children under the age of 18 living with them, 67.4% were married couples living together, 11.6% had a female householder with no husband present, and 20.9% were non-families. 18.6% of all households were made up of individuals, and 9.3% had someone living alone who was 65 years of age or older. The average household size was 2.51 and the average family size was 2.85.

The median age in the city was 41 years. 25% of residents were under the age of 18; 7.5% were between the ages of 18 and 24; 22.2% were from 25 to 44; 27.8% were from 45 to 64; and 17.6% were 65 years of age or older. The gender makeup of the city was 47.2% male and 52.8% female.

=== 2000 census ===
As of the census of 2000, there were 136 people, 49 households, and 39 families living in the city. The population density was 550.8 inhabitants per square mile (212.7/km^{2}). There were 54 housing units at an average density of 218.7 per square mile (84.4/km^{2}). The racial makeup of the city was 100.00% White.

There were 49 households, out of which 46.9% had children under the age of 18 living with them, 63.3% were married couples living together, 8.2% had a female householder with no husband present, and 18.4% were non-families. 14.3% of all households were made up of individuals, and 14.3% had someone living alone who was 65 years of age or older. The average household size was 2.78 and the average family size was 2.85.

In the city, the population was spread out, with 33.8% under the age of 18, 5.9% from 18 to 24, 32.4% from 25 to 44, 18.4% from 45 to 64, and 9.6% who were 65 years of age or older. The median age was 33 years. For every 100 females, there were 88.9 males. For every 100 females age 18 and over, there were 83.7 males.

The median income for a household in the city was $34,583, and the median income for a family was $36,250. Males had a median income of $26,250 versus $17,500 for females. The per capita income for the city was $15,284. There were 2.5% of families and 8.1% of the population living below the poverty line, including 5.4% of under eighteens and 36.4% of those over 64.

== Education ==
The municipality is within the boundary of the Central Community School District.
