= Leeds Junior High School =

- U.S. National Register of Historic Places
- Location within Iowa Location within the United States
- Location: 3919 Jefferson St. Sioux City, Iowa
- Coordinates: 42°32′15.7″N 96°22′05.8″W
- Area: 2 acres (0.81 ha)
- Built: 1939
- Architectural style: Art Deco
- MPS: Public Schools for Iowa: Growth and Change MPS
- NRHP reference No.: 02001228
- Added to NRHP: October 24, 2002

Leeds Junior High School was a historic building located in Sioux City, Iowa, United States. High school education in the city dates from 1867, and the first dedicated high school building was completed in 1893. Other schools were built as the district and the city continued to grow. Leeds Junior-Senior High School was built to educate students on the far northeast corner of the city. It was financed by a combination of a local bond referendum and funds from the Public Works Administration. The two-story brick building was completed in 1939 in the Art Deco style. Eventually newer high schools and junior high schools were built on the north side of Sioux City, and the building became an elementary school. It was listed on the National Register of Historic Places in 2002. The building was torn down in 2008 when it was replaced by a new school building.
