= Master Service Station (Waterloo, Iowa) =

- U.S. National Register of Historic Places
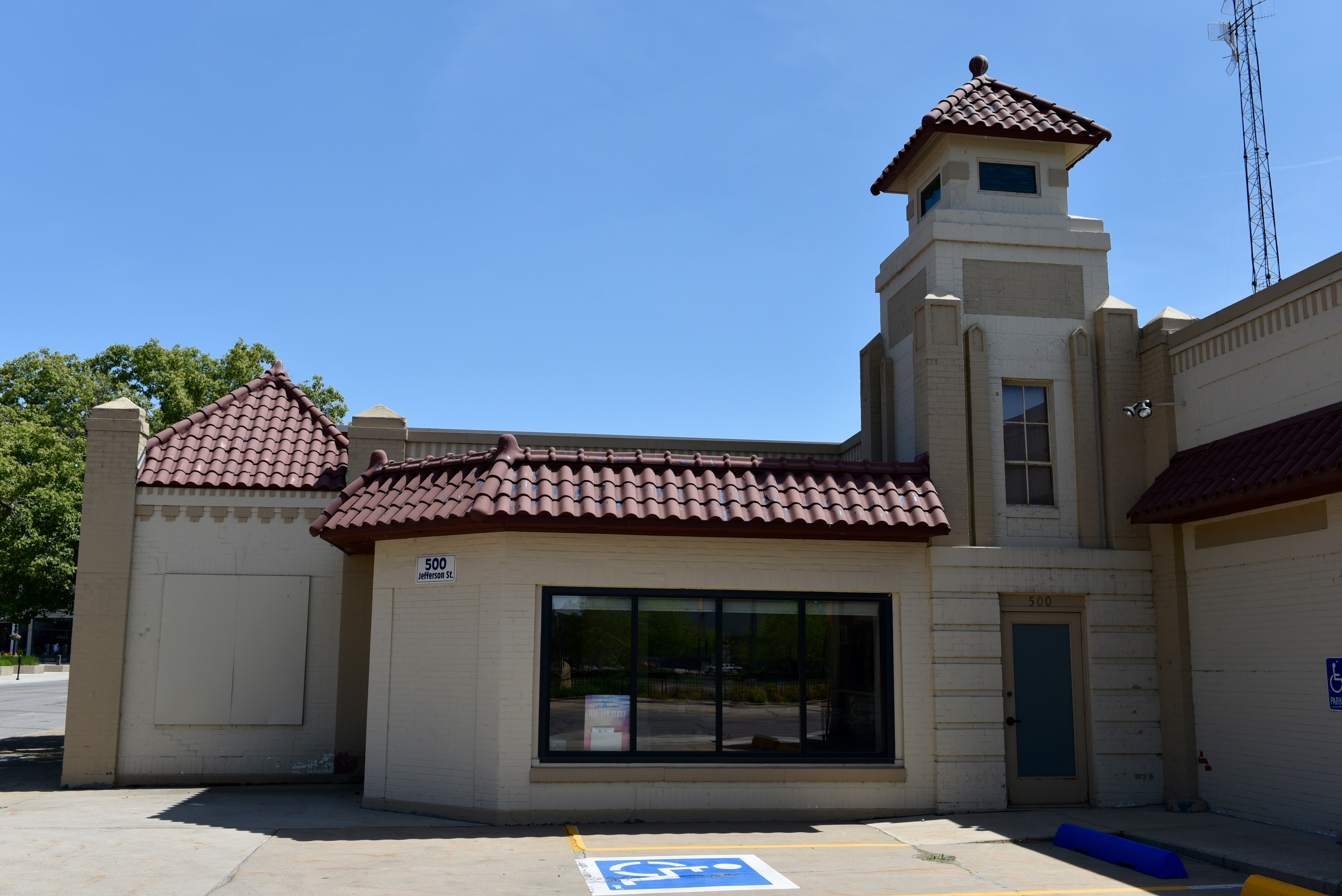

- Location within Iowa Location within the United States
- Location: 500 Jefferson St. Waterloo, Iowa
- Coordinates: 42°29′41.1″N 92°20′29.9″W
- Area: less than one acre
- Built: 1930
- Built by: John G. Miller Construction Company
- Architectural style: Mission/Spanish Revival; Art Deco
- NRHP reference No.: 10001204
- Added to NRHP: February 7, 2011

Master Service Station, also known as Bennett's Tire & Battery Co., is a historic building located in Waterloo, Iowa, United States. This was one of the first "super service stations" built in the city. Developed in California in the early 1920s, they combined a filling station with other auto-related services. The first one was built in Waterloo in 1928, and this was one of three that opened in 1930. Located on a corner lot, it is a single-story structure that follows an L-shaped plan. The building exhibits both Art Deco (piers) and Spanish Colonial Revival (tower and tile roof). Its original owner, Homer L. Lichty, lost the business to bankruptcy in 1932. The station was acquired by John G. Miller, who constructed the building. Miller sold the station in 1934. Bennett's Tire & Brake Co., a Waterloo Goodyear tire dealer, moved in sometime after that and remained until 1960. The Waterloo Convention & Visitors Bureau is now located in the building. It was listed on the National Register of Historic Places in 2011.
