= Decorah Municipal Bathhouse and Swimming Pool =

- U.S. National Register of Historic Places
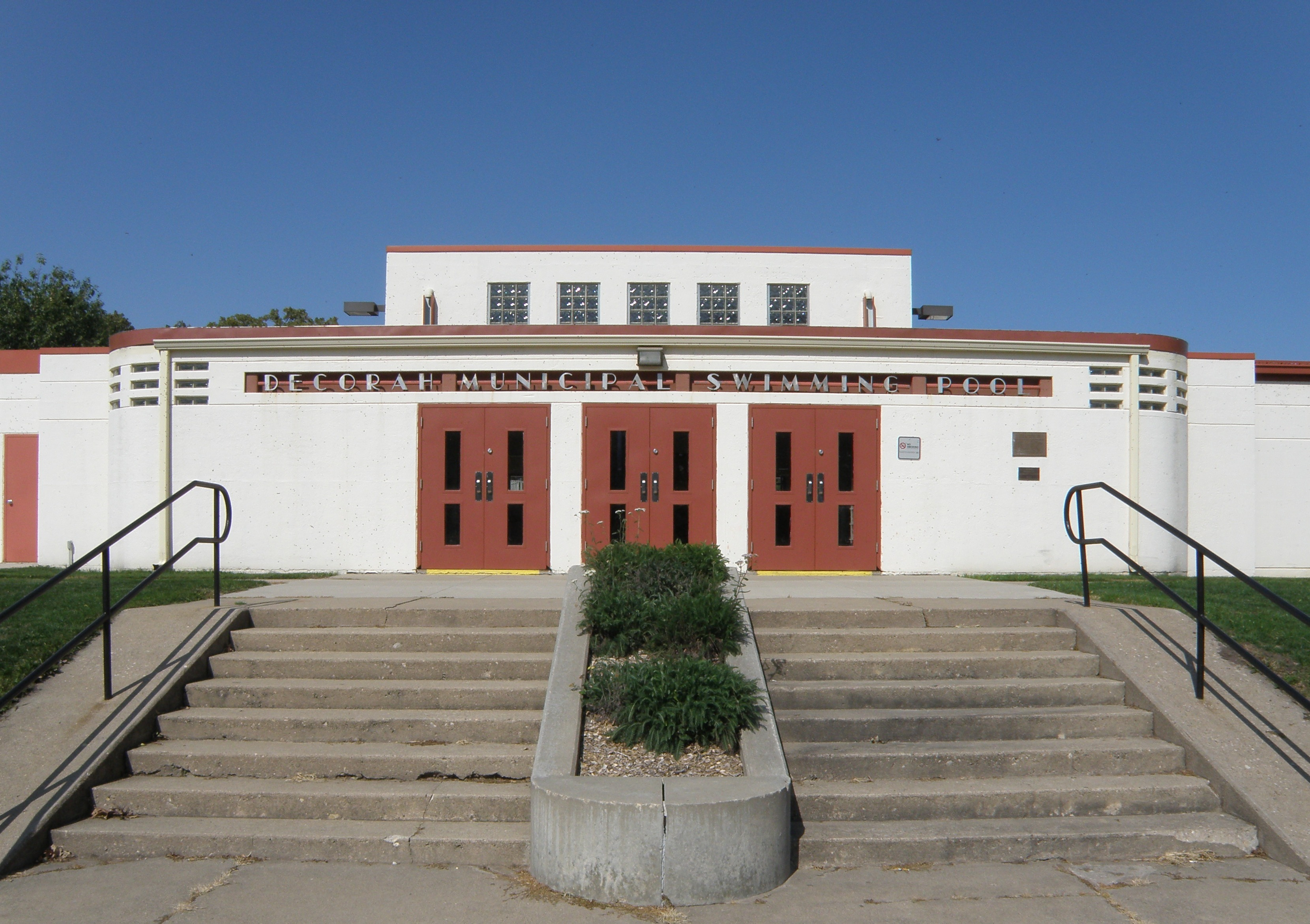

- Location within Iowa Location within the United States
- Location: 701 College Dr. Decorah, Iowa
- Coordinates: 43°18′49″N 91°48′04″W
- Built: 1937
- Built by: Fred Carlson Co.
- Architect: Charles Altfillisch
- Architectural style: Moderne
- NRHP reference No.: 11001057
- Added to NRHP: January 30, 2012

The Decorah Municipal Bathhouse and Swimming Pool is located in Decorah, Iowa, United States. Edward Novak of the Charles Altfillisch architectural firm in Decorah designed the facility in the Art Moderne and the International Style. The project was a partnership between the local government and the federal Works Progress Administration (WPA). The property on which it stands was donated by Luther College and a few local citizens. The Fred Carlson Company of Decorah, which supervised its construction, hired unemployed men from the area as laborers. The bathhouse "is the only remaining building from WPA projects of its style and significance in Iowa." It was listed on the National Register of Historic Places in 2012.
