= William C. and Margaret Egloff House =

Historic house in Iowa, United States

- U.S. National Register of Historic Places
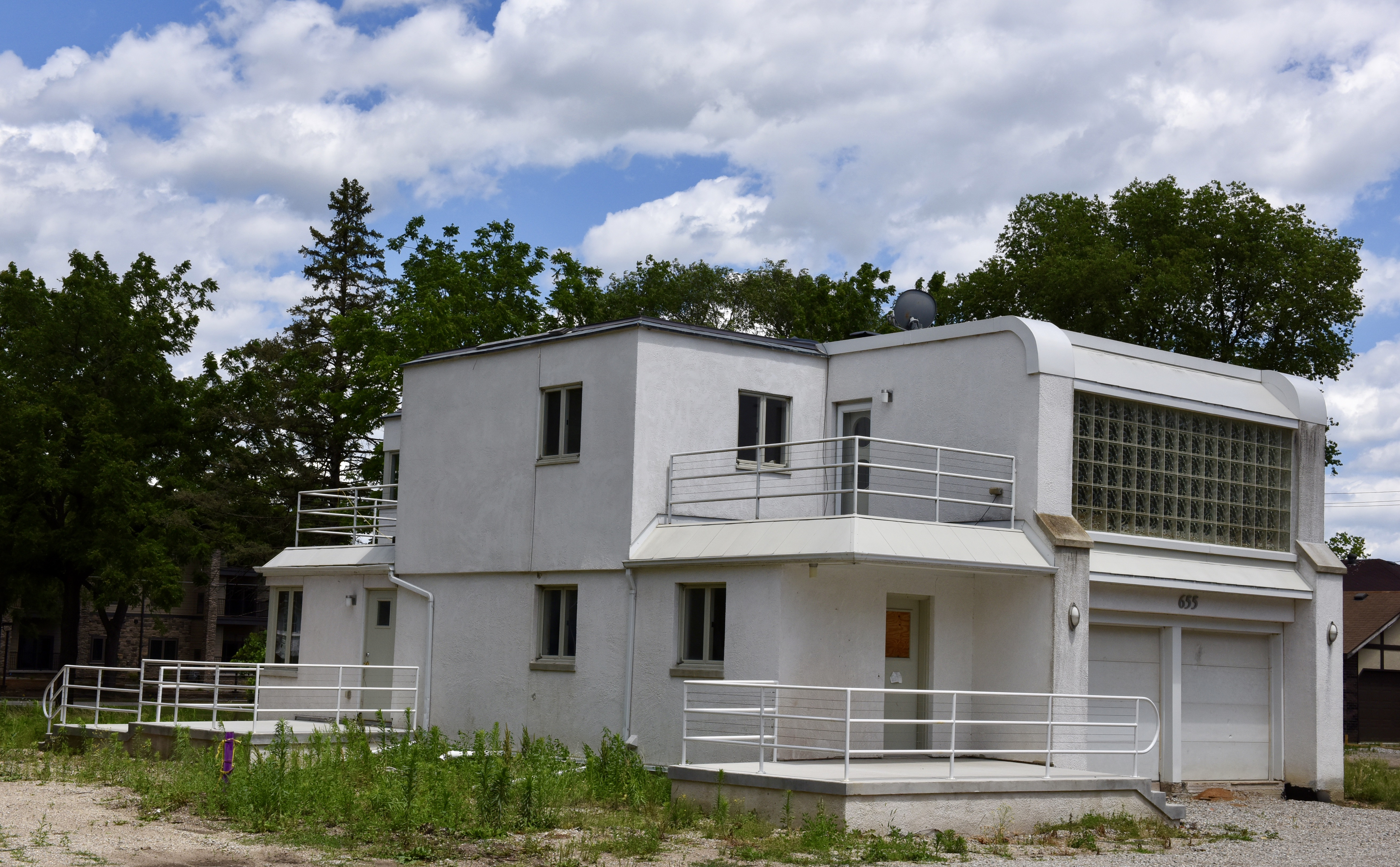

- Location within Iowa Location within the United States
- Location: 310 E. State St. Mason City, Iowa
- Coordinates: 43°09′07.4″N 93°11′44.1″W
- Area: less than one acre
- Built: 1939
- Architect: E. Richard Cone
- Architectural style: International
- NRHP reference No.: 100000934
- Added to NRHP: May 1, 2017

The William C. and Margaret Egloff House is a historic building located in Mason City, Iowa, United States. The house is a rare example of the International style in the Midwest. It was designed by St. Paul, Minnesota architect E. Richard Cone, who was also William Egloff's brother-in-law. The two-story structure is covered with stucco. It features a two-bay off-centered garage, a wall of glass block windows, built-in dressers, rounded corner shelving, a black smokestack fireplace, and a recreation room that resembles the inside of a ship. It has porthole windows and an inlaid rubber compass in the floor. William Egloff was a local physician who enjoyed sailing. Contrary to local lore, the house's various nautical theme's "stemmed from (Egloff's) pleasure sailing and Atlantic sea voyages rather than from service in the U.S. Navy." It was moved from its original location on Seventh Street N.E., along the Winnebago River, after it sustained damage in a flood in 2008. The house was listed on the National Register of Historic Places in 2017.
