= Louisa County Courthouse (Iowa) =

- U.S. National Register of Historic Places
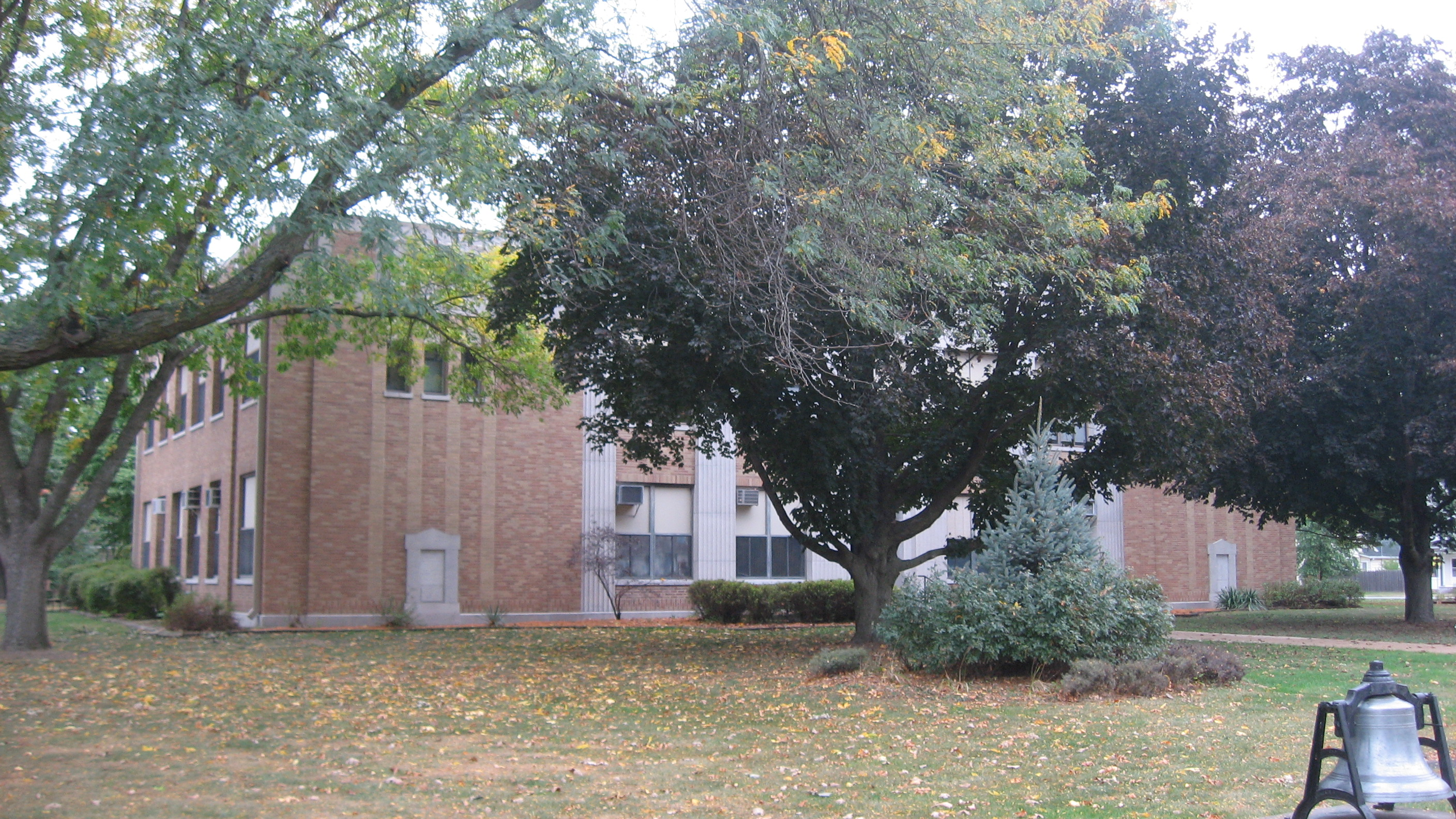

- Location within Iowa Location within the United States
- Location: Main St. Wapello, Iowa
- Coordinates: 41°10′43″N 91°11′9″W
- Area: less than one acre
- Built: 1928
- Built by: Zohbon and Lewis
- Architect: Keiffer, Jones and Thomas
- Architectural style: Art Deco
- MPS: County Courthouses in Iowa TR
- NRHP reference No.: 81000253
- Added to NRHP: July 2, 1981

The Louisa County Courthouse in Wapello, Iowa, United States, was built in 1928. It was listed on the National Register of Historic Places in 1981 as a part of the County Courthouses in Iowa Thematic Resource. The courthouse is the fourth building the county has used for court functions and county administration.

== History ==
The legislature of the Wisconsin Territory chose Middle Wapello as the county seat to the exclusion of Upper and Lower Wapello. The county commissioners accepted the decision and the three communities later merged into a single town. The county's first courthouse was a privately owned structure built of logs. A brick courthouse was built by the county in 1840. It was a 40 by 22 feet (12.2 by 6.7 m) structure was also used as a school house. The county lacked the money to pay for it so they agreed to pay the builder 20% interest on the $1,300 that was due them. A new courthouse was built in Wapello in 1854 for $9,577.69. Columbus Junction desired to be the county seat and they raised $25,000 and built a two-story brick building for a courthouse. When they failed to become the county seat the building became a school. The present courthouse was built on the same site as the 1854 building for around $100,000.

== Architecture ==
The two-story building was designed in a simplified version of the Art Deco style by the Des Moines architectural firm of Keiffer, Jones and Thomas, and built by Zohbon and Lewis of Des Moines. It is constructed of tan colored bricks and trimmed in stone. The courthouses features a symmetrical facade with end pavilions that slightly project forward. Bas reliefs of eagles carved in stone in the center of the pavilions. The significance of the courthouse is derived from its association with county government, and the political power and prestige of Wapello as the county seat.
