= Wapello, Iowa =

- City
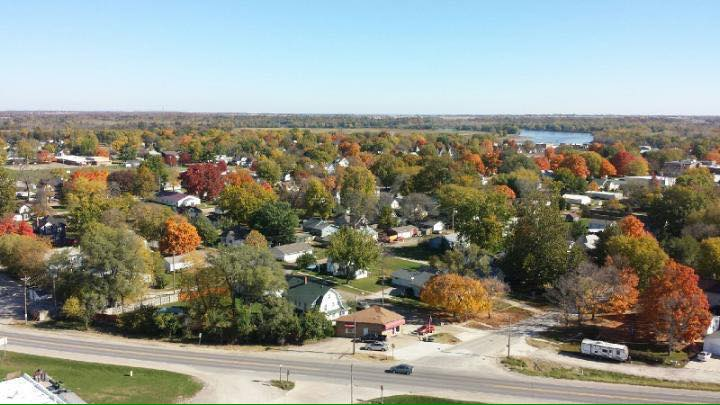
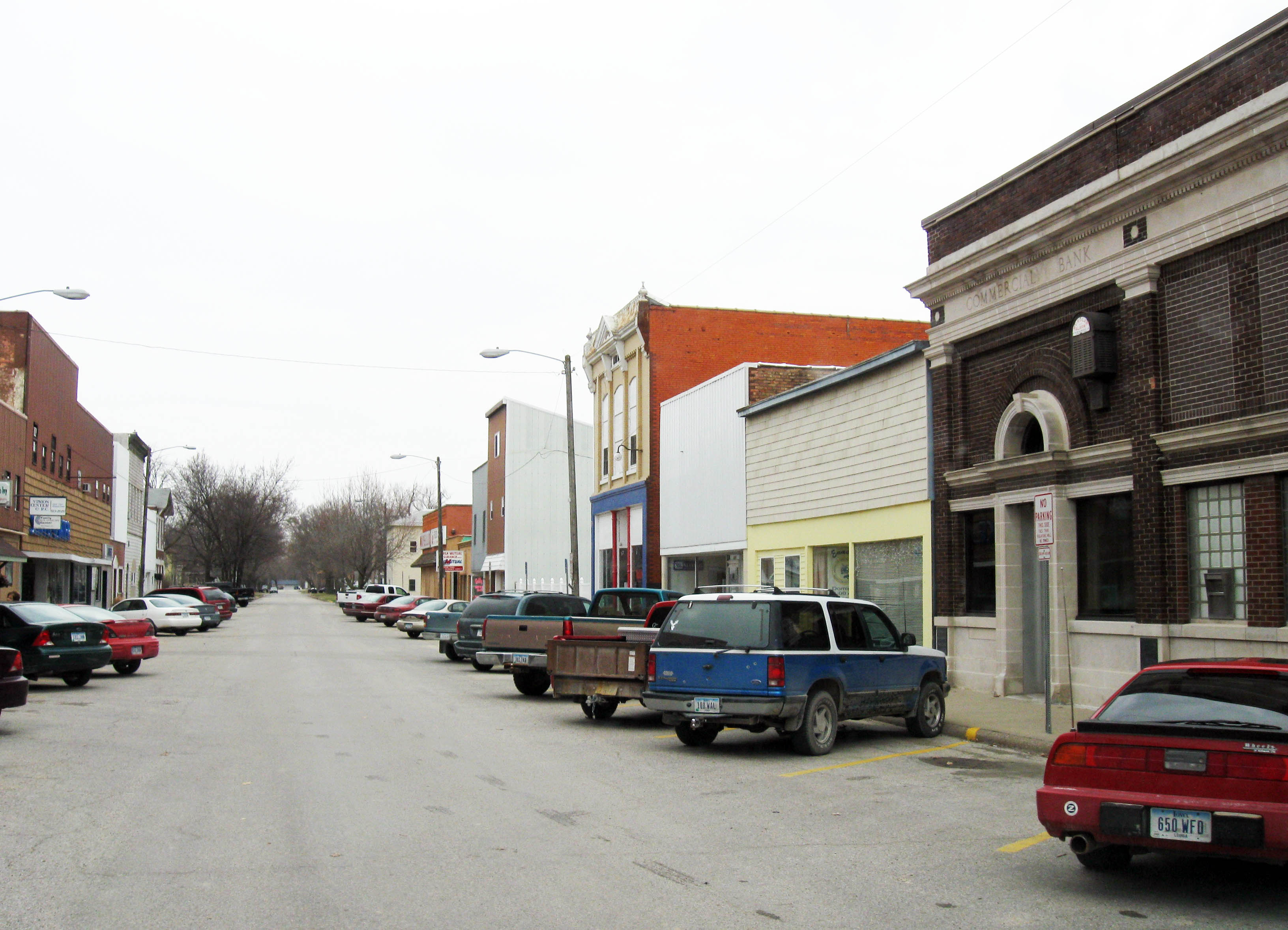
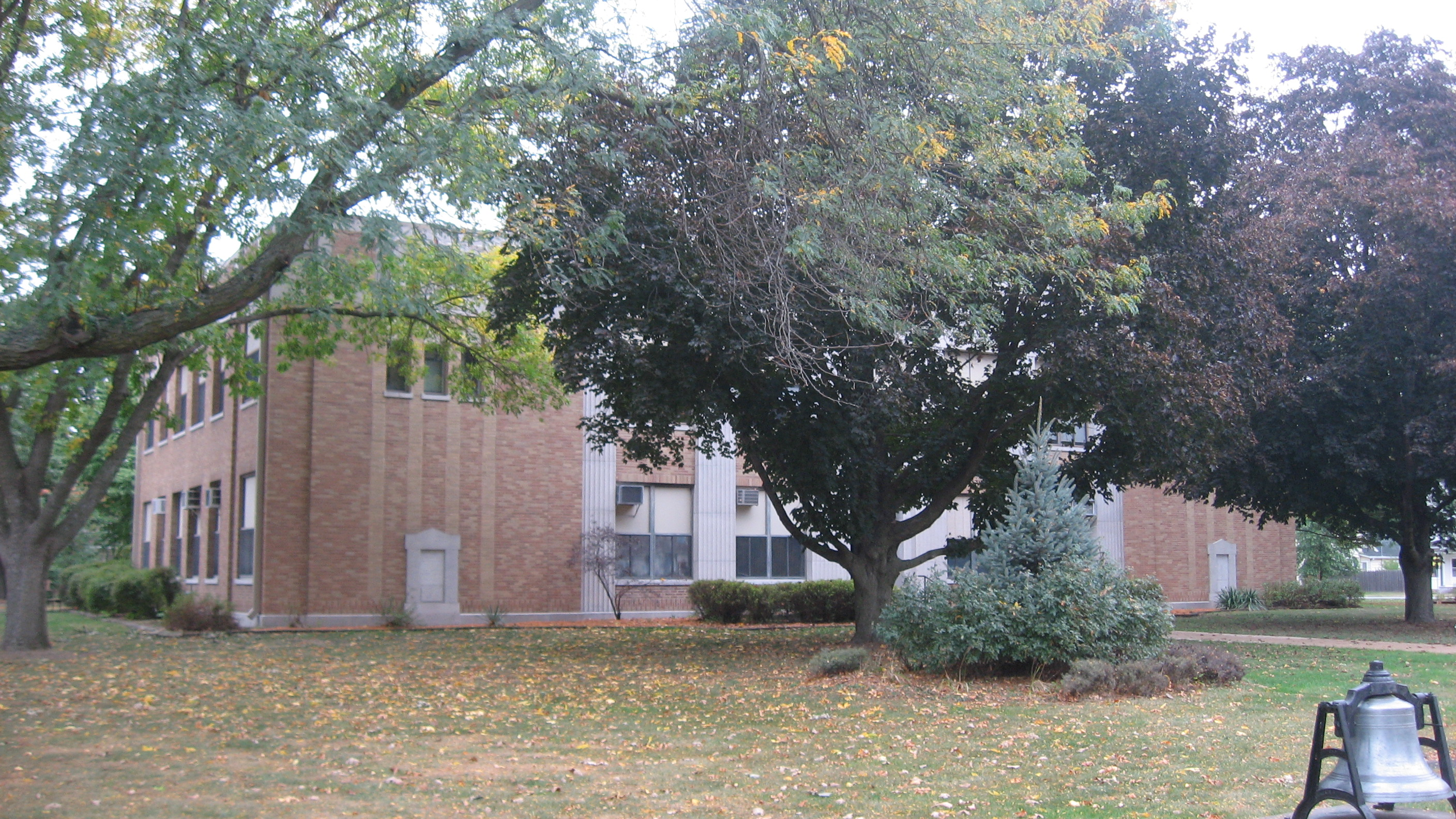
- Wapello Aerial View and Iowa River Downtown Wapello Louisa County Courthouse

- Location of Wapello, Iowa
- Coordinates: 41°10′47″N 91°11′18″W
- Country: United States
- State: Iowa
- County: Louisa
- Named for: Wapello

Area
  - Total: 1.29 sq mi (3.35 km^{2})
  - Land: 1.25 sq mi (3.24 km^{2})
  - Water: 0.042 sq mi (0.11 km^{2})
- Elevation: 584 ft (178 m)

Population (2020)
  - Total: 2,084
  - Density: 1,664.0/sq mi (642.46/km^{2})
- Time zone: UTC-6 (Central (CST))
  - Summer (DST): UTC-5 (CDT)
- ZIP code: 52653
- Area code: 319
- FIPS code: 19-82200
- GNIS feature ID: 0462662
- Website: www.cityofwapello.com

Wapello is a city in and the county seat of Louisa County, Iowa, United States. The population was 2,084 at the time of the 2020 census.

Wapello is part of the Muscatine Micropolitan Statistical Area.

== History ==
Wapello was platted in the late 1830s.

The city's namesake is Wapello, a Meskwaki chief.

== Geography ==
Wapello is located on the west side of the Iowa River. US Route 61 passes through the community.

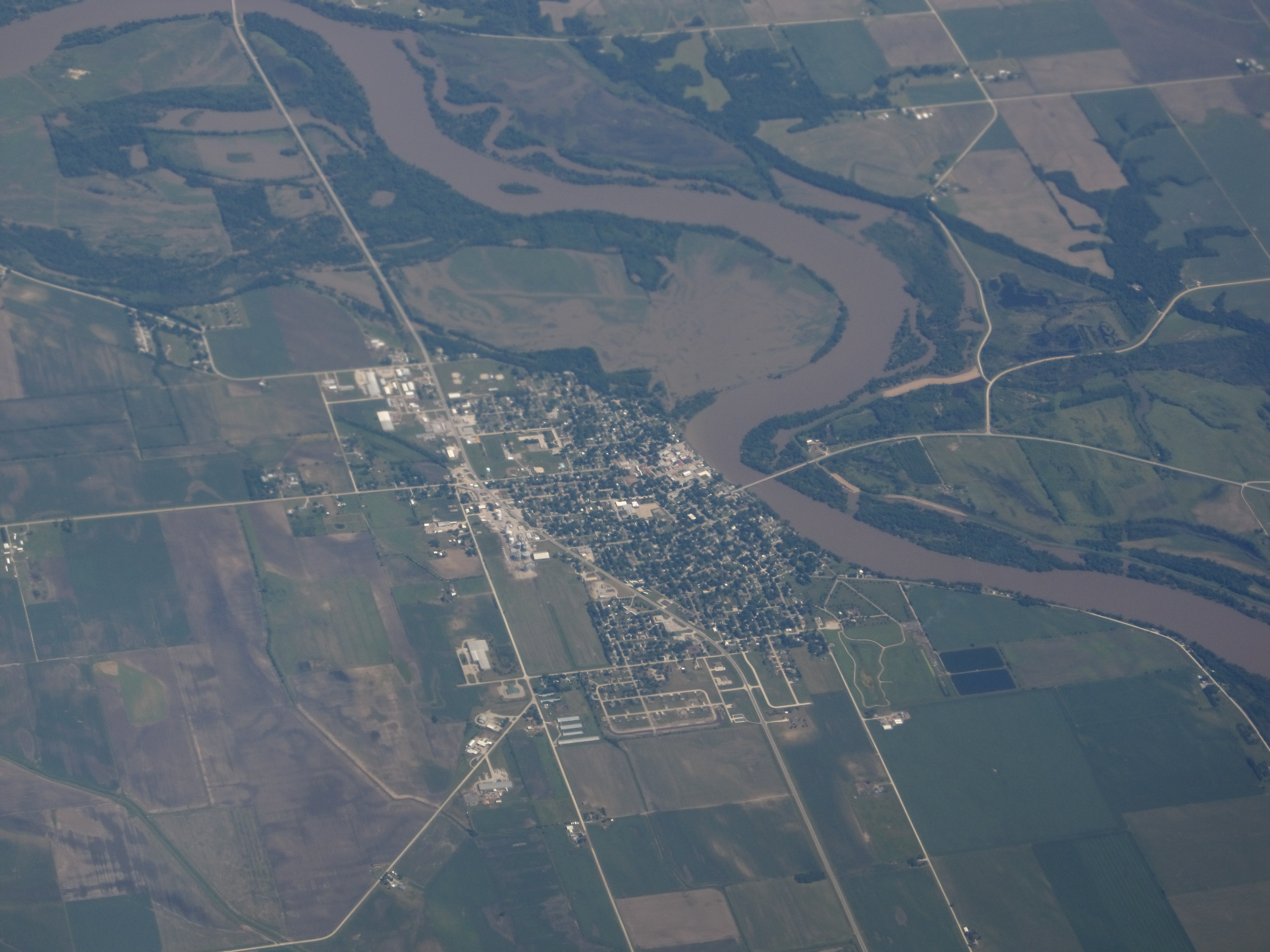
Aerial View Wapello, Iowa

According to the United States Census Bureau, the city has a total area of 1.34 square miles (3.47 km^{2}), of which 1.29 square miles (3.34 km^{2}) is land and 0.05 square miles (0.13 km^{2}) is water.

== Demographics ==
Historical populations
Year	Pop.	±%
1850	336	—
1860	821	+144.3%
1870	870	+6.0%
1880	928	+6.7%
1890	1,009	+8.7%
1900	1,398	+38.6%
1910	1,326	−5.2%
1920	1,480	+11.6%
1930	1,502	+1.5%
1940	1,603	+6.7%
1950	1,755	+9.5%
1960	1,745	−0.6%
1970	1,873	+7.3%
1980	2,011	+7.4%
1990	2,013	+0.1%
2000	2,124	+5.5%
2010	2,067	−2.7%
2020	2,084	+0.8%
Source:"U.S. Census website". United States Census Bureau. and Iowa Data Center; Source: U.S. Decennial Census

=== 2020 census ===
As of the 2020 census, Wapello had a population of 2,084, with 837 households and 543 families. The population density was 1,664.0 inhabitants per square mile (642.5/km^{2}), and there were 900 housing units at an average density of 718.6 per square mile (277.5/km^{2}).

The median age was 43.2 years. 21.6% of residents were under the age of 18, and 23.1% were 65 years of age or older. 24.7% of residents were under the age of 20; 5.8% were between the ages of 20 and 24; 21.6% were from 25 to 44; and 24.8% were from 45 to 64. For every 100 females, there were 91.9 males, and for every 100 females age 18 and over, there were 87.9 males age 18 and over.

Of the 837 households, 29.7% had children under the age of 18 living with them; 49.5% were married-couple households; 7.0% were cohabiting-couple households; 28.8% were households with a female householder and no spouse or partner present; and 14.7% were households with a male householder and no spouse or partner present. About 35.1% of households were non-families, 29.9% were made up of individuals, and 15.0% had someone living alone who was 65 years of age or older.

Of the 900 housing units, 7.0% were vacant. The homeowner vacancy rate was 0.2%, and the rental vacancy rate was 7.7%. 0.0% of residents lived in urban areas, while 100.0% lived in rural areas.

Racial composition as of the 2020 census
Race	Number	Percent
White	1,805	86.6%
Black or African American	17	0.8%
American Indian and Alaska Native	12	0.6%
Asian	6	0.3%
Native Hawaiian and Other Pacific Islander	0	0.0%
Some other race	112	5.4%
Two or more races	132	6.3%
Hispanic or Latino (of any race)	210	10.1%

=== 2010 census ===
As of the census of 2010, there were 2,067 people, 825 households, and 544 families living in the city. The population density was 1,602.3 inhabitants per square mile (618.7/km^{2}). There were 889 housing units at an average density of 689.1 per square mile (266.1/km^{2}). The racial makeup of the city was 94.2% White, 0.5% African American, 0.2% Native American, 0.1% Asian, 3.4% from other races, and 1.5% from two or more races. Hispanic or Latino of any race were 8.2% of the population.

There were 825 households, of which 32.0% had children under the age of 18 living with them, 50.4% were married couples living together, 10.8% had a female householder with no husband present, 4.7% had a male householder with no wife present, and 34.1% were non-families. 28.6% of all households were made up of individuals, and 14.3% had someone living alone who was 65 years of age or older. The average household size was 2.45 and the average family size was 3.02.

The median age in the city was 40 years. 25.5% of residents were under the age of 18; 6.4% were between the ages of 18 and 24; 24.2% were from 25 to 44; 26% were from 45 to 64; and 17.9% were 65 years of age or older. The gender makeup of the city was 49.1% male and 50.9% female.

=== 2000 census ===
As of the census of 2000, there were 2,124 people, 836 households, and 572 families living in the city. The population density was 1,688.3 inhabitants per square mile (651.9/km^{2}). There were 893 housing units at an average density of 709.8 per square mile (274.1/km^{2}). The racial makeup of the city was 96.28% White, 0.09% African American, 0.19% Native American, 0.19% Asian, 2.82% from other races, and 0.42% from two or more races. Hispanic or Latino of any race were 6.92% of the population.

There were 836 households, out of which 31.7% had children under the age of 18 living with them, 56.7% were married couples living together, 9.4% had a female householder with no husband present, and 31.5% were non-families. 27.2% of all households were made up of individuals, and 15.1% had someone living alone who was 65 years of age or older. The average household size was 2.48 and the average family size was 3.02.

25.0% are under the age of 18, 9.6% from 18 to 24, 26.3% from 25 to 44, 21.0% from 45 to 64, and 18.1% who were 65 years of age or older. The median age was 37 years. For every 100 females, there were 93.8 males. For every 100 females age 18 and over, there were 90.4 males.

The median income for a household in the city was $37,556, and the median income for a family was $45,395. Males had a median income of $31,346 versus $21,220 for females. The per capita income for the city was $17,947. About 10.0% of families and 14.3% of the population were below the poverty line, including 25.4% of those under age 18 and 8.3% of those age 65 or over.

== Education ==
The Wapello Community School District operates area public schools.

== Notable person ==
- Edwin Richley Hicklin, United States district court judge
