= National Register of Historic Places listings in Madison County, Iowa =

Location of Madison County in Iowa

This is a list of the National Register of Historic Places listings in Madison County, Iowa.

This is intended to be a complete list of the properties and districts on the National Register of Historic Places in Madison County, Iowa, United States. Latitude and longitude coordinates are provided for many National Register properties and districts; these locations may be seen together in a map.

There are 55 properties listed on the National Register in the county and at least one former listing.

This National Park Service list is complete through NPS recent listings posted September 25, 2026.

	Name on the Register	Image	Date listed	Location	City or town	Description
1	James Allen Stone Barn		September 29, 1987 (#87001658)	2½ miles southeast of Earlham; 41°26′56″N 94°06′20″W	Earlham	
2	George and Susan Guiberson Armstrong House		September 29, 1987 (#87001668)	2½ miles north of Winterset on G4R; 41°23′18″N 93°58′26″W	Winterset	
3	C.D. and Eliza Heath Bevington Privy	C.D. and Eliza Heath Bevington Privy	September 29, 1987 (#87001669)	805 S. 2nd Ave. 41°19′40″N 94°00′53″W	Winterset	
4	C.D. Bevington House and Stone Barn	C.D. Bevington House and Stone Barn	December 12, 1976 (#76000785)	805 S. 2nd Ave. 41°19′40″N 94°00′54″W	Winterset	
5	Bricker-Price Block		January 17, 2017 (#100000487)	105-115 S. Chestnut Ave. 41°29′29″N 94°07′23″W	Earlham	
6	Seymour Church House		September 29, 1987 (#87001683)	U.S. Route 169; 41°24′08″N 94°02′25″W	Winterset	
7	W.J. and Nettie J. Cornell House	W.J. and Nettie J. Cornell House	January 11, 1991 (#90002132)	602 W. Court Ave. 41°20′03″N 94°01′15″W	Winterset	
8	J.D. Craven Women's Relief Corps Hall		January 19, 1984 (#84001274)	South St. 41°12′50″N 94°11′07″W	Macksburg	
9	Cunningham Bridge		May 15, 1998 (#98000509)	Upland Trail over the North River; 41°24′06″N 93°51′40″W	Bevington	
10	Cutler-Donahoe Covered Bridge	Cutler-Donahoe Covered Bridge	October 8, 1976 (#76000787)	Winterset City Park; 41°19′52″N 94°00′31″W	Winterset	
11	John and Amanda Bigler Drake House		September 29, 1987 (#87001670)	11 miles west of Winterset on Iowa Highway 92; 41°18′57″N 94°13′22″W	Winterset	
12	Duff Barn		March 18, 1993 (#87001672)	1½ miles north of Winterset on U.S. Route 169; 41°22′03″N 94°00′53″W	Winterset	
13	John M. Duncan House		September 29, 1987 (#87001673)	½ mile south of Winterset on County Road P69; 41°19′12″N 94°01′00″W	Winterset	
14	Earlham Downtown Historic District		September 29, 2026 (#100013447)	Chestnut Avenue, 1st Street, NE 2nd Street; 41°29′30″N 94°07′23″W	Earlham	
15	Earlham Public School	Earlham Public School	June 2, 1982 (#82002631)	809 Main St. 41°29′31″N 94°07′16″W	Earlham	
16	John and Elizabeth McMurn Early House		March 18, 1993 (#87001653)	1 mile south of County Road G31 between County Roads P53 and P57; 41°23′21″N 94°09′27″W	Earlham	
17	Henry and Elizabeth Adkinson Evans House		September 29, 1987 (#87001674)	½ mile east of U.S. Route 169 on County Road G50; 41°18′42″N 93°59′33″W	Winterset	
18	W.T. Ford House		September 29, 1987 (#87001654)	2½ miles south of Earlham on County Road P57; 41°27′13″N 94°08′06″W	Earlham	
19	Guiberson House	Guiberson House	July 10, 1979 (#79003697)	302 S. 4th Ave. 41°19′56″N 94°01′06″W	Winterset	
20	Daniel and Nancy Swaford Henderson House		September 29, 1987 (#87001655)	8 miles south of Earlham on County Road P57; 41°22′37″N 94°07′55″W	Earlham	
21	Hogback Covered Bridge	Hogback Covered Bridge	August 28, 1976 (#76000788)	4 miles north of Winterset; 41°23′09″N 94°03′00″W	Winterset	
22	Holliwell Covered Bridge	Holliwell Covered Bridge	August 28, 1976 (#76000789)	4 miles southeast of Winterset; 41°19′21″N 93°57′33″W	Winterset	
23	John S. and Elizabeth Beem Holmes Barn		September 29, 1987 (#87001665)	County Road G50; 41°17′00″N 93°57′14″W	St. Charles	
24	Emily Hornback House	Emily Hornback House	September 29, 1987 (#87001687)	605 N. 1st St. 41°20′22″N 94°00′46″W	Winterset	
25	Imes Covered Bridge	Imes Covered Bridge	February 9, 1979 (#76000784)	Iowa Highway 251; 41°17′21″N 93°48′03″W	St. Charles	
26	Miles and Elizabeth Smith Kellogg House		June 19, 2017 (#87002140)	Off County Road G50; 41°19′04″N 93°59′00″W	Winterset vicinity	
27	Judge W.H. and Emma Lewis Historic District		August 27, 2020 (#100005493)	1145 Summit St. West; 41°15′04″N 94°01′42″W	Winterset	
28	John Andrew and Sara Macumber Ice House		March 18, 1993 (#87001675)	On County Road G53 1½ miles east of its junction with County Road P69; 41°15′04″N 94°03′56″W	Winterset	
29	Madison County Courthouse	Madison County Courthouse	August 13, 1976 (#76000790)	City Sq. 41°20′06″N 94°00′50″W	Winterset	
30	McDonald House		March 18, 1993 (#87001676)	3½ miles west of Winterset off Iowa Highway 92; 41°21′32″N 94°05′31″W	Winterset	
31	Peter and Isabelle McCulloch McQuie Milkhouse		September 29, 1987 (#87001656)	Southwest of Earlham; 41°25′51″N 94°09′34″W	Earlham	
32	Miller Bridge		May 15, 1998 (#98000508)	McBride Trail over an unnamed stream 41°24′45″N 93°56′34″W	Winterset	
33	Morgan Bridge		May 15, 1998 (#98000507)	Maple Lane over a branch of Clanton Creek; 41°10′16″N 93°55′55″W	Old Peru	
34	William Anzi Nichols House		September 29, 1987 (#87001677)	1 mile east of Winterset on Iowa Highway 92; 41°20′42″N 93°59′57″W	Winterset	
35	North River Stone Schoolhouse	North River Stone Schoolhouse	April 11, 1977 (#77000537)	North of Winterset off U.S. Route 169; 41°24′10″N 94°02′32″W	Winterset	
36	William Ogburn House		September 29, 1987 (#87001660)	1½ miles north of East Peru; 41°15′03″N 93°55′19″W	East Peru	
37	Hogan and Martha A. Runkle Queen House		September 29, 1987 (#87001667)	5 miles west of St. Charles on County Road G50; 41°18′05″N 93°53′51″W	St. Charles	
38	Roseman Covered Bridge	Roseman Covered Bridge	September 1, 1976 (#76000792)	West of Winterset off Iowa Highway 92; 41°17′31″N 94°09′05″W	Winterset	
39	St. Patrick's Church	St. Patrick's Church	December 12, 1978 (#78001245)	Northwest of Cumming; 41°25′39″N 93°47′34″W	Cumming	
40	John and Fredericka Meyer Schnellbacher House		September 29, 1987 (#87001678)	On County Road G47 1½ miles east of its junction with County Road P53; 41°17′26″N 94°08′40″W	Winterset	
41	Nicholas Schoenenberger House and Barn		July 12, 1984 (#84001275)	Off Iowa Highway 169; 41°13′17″N 93°59′58″W	Winterset	
42	William and Mary (Messersmith) Seerley Barn and Milkhouse-Smokehouse	William and Mary (Messersmith) Seerley Barn and Milkhouse-Smokehouse	August 20, 2009 (#09000621)	1840 137th Lane; 41°26′45″N 94°05′24″W	Earlham	
43	William R. and Martha Foster Shriver House	William R. and Martha Foster Shriver House	March 18, 1993 (#87001689)	616 E. Court Ave. 41°20′03″N 94°00′25″W	Winterset	
44	Hiram C. Smith House		September 29, 1987 (#87001684)	6 miles west of Winterset on Iowa Highway 92; 41°19′48″N 94°08′34″W	Winterset	
45	Hiram C. Smith Milking Shed		September 29, 1987 (#87001686)	6 miles west of Winterset on Iowa Highway 92; 41°19′47″N 94°08′32″W	Winterset	
46	Sprague, Brown, and Knowlton Store	Sprague, Brown, and Knowlton Store	September 29, 1987 (#87001690)	1st and Court; 41°20′03″N 94°00′52″W	Winterset	
47	Miller Richard and Mary Fisher Tidrick House	Miller Richard and Mary Fisher Tidrick House	March 18, 1993 (#93000126)	122 S. 4th Ave. 41°20′01″N 94°01′06″W	Winterset	
48	J.G. and Elizabeth S. Vawter House	J.G. and Elizabeth S. Vawter House	September 29, 1987 (#87001692)	223 S. 1st St. 41°19′58″N 94°00′46″W	Winterset	
49	Henry C. Wallace House	Henry C. Wallace House	January 3, 1985 (#85000005)	422 W. Jefferson; 41°20′07″N 94°01′09″W	Winterset	
50	White, Munger and Company Store	White, Munger and Company Store	September 29, 1987 (#87001693)	102 W. Court; 41°20′03″N 94°00′53″W	Winterset	
51	Seth and Elizabeth Wilson House		September 29, 1987 (#87001659)	1¾ miles east of County Road P57 on County Road G14; 41°28′10″N 94°05′39″W	Earlham	
52	Winterset City Park Historic District	Winterset City Park Historic District	March 10, 2021 (#100006220)	South 9th St. at East South St. 41°19′52″N 94°00′13″W	Winterset	
53	Winterset Courthouse Square Commercial Historic District	Winterset Courthouse Square Commercial Historic District	December 22, 2015 (#15000915)	Roughly bounded by Green & 2nd Sts., 2nd Ave. & alley S. of Court Ave. 41°20′05″N 94°00′51″W	Winterset	
54	Winterset High School	Winterset High School	July 6, 2020 (#100005339)	110 W. Washington St. 41°19′59″N 94°00′54″W	Winterset	
55	Winterset Municipal Power Plant		June 16, 2025 (#100011923)	317 N 1st St./John Wayne Dr. N 41°20′12″N 94°00′52″W	Winterset	

== Former listings ==
	Name on the Register	Image	Date listed	Date removed	Location	City or town	Description
1	Cedar Covered Bridge	Cedar Covered Bridge	August 28, 1976 (#76000786)	October 18, 2002	1.5 mi. E of Winterset; 41°21′57″N 93°59′27″W	Winterset vicinity	Destroyed by arsonist on September 3, 2002. Bridge was rebuilt, only to again be destroyed by arsonist in 2017. The bridge has again been rebuilt.
2	McBride Covered Bridge	McBride Covered Bridge	September 8, 1976 (#76000791)	September 23, 1987	About 2 mi. NE of Winterset	Winterset vicinity	Destroyed by arson in 1983.

== See also ==
- List of National Historic Landmarks in Iowa
- National Register of Historic Places listings in Iowa
- Listings in neighboring counties: Adair, Clarke, Dallas, Union, Warren
