= David Harris (mason) =

David Harris was a stone mason in Madison County, Iowa in the 19th-century. He was born in Wales.

A number of his works are listed on the U.S. National Register of Historic Places.

== Works ==
Works include:

- John and Amanda Bigler Drake House (built 1856), 11 mi. W of Winterset on IA 92 Winterset, IA Harris, David
- Duff Barn, 1 1/2 mi. N of Winterset on US 169 Winterset, IA Harris, David
- Emily Hornback House, 605 N. First St. Winterset, IA Harris, David
- McDonald House, 3 1/2 mi. W of Winterset off IA 92 Winterset, IA Harris, David
- William Anzi Nichols House, 1 mi. E of Winterset on IA 92 Winterset, IA Harris, David
- William Ogburn House, 1 1/2 mi. N of East Peru East Peru, IA Harris, David
- William R. and Martha Foster Shriver House, 616 E. Court Ave. Winterset, IA Harris, David
- Sprague, Brown, and Knowlton Store, First and Court Winterset, IA Harris, David
