= Early House =

Early House may refer to:

- Early House (Petersburg, Kentucky), listed on the NRHP in Boone County, Kentucky
- John and Elizabeth McMurn Early House, Earlham, Iowa, listed on the NRHP in Madison County, Iowa
- William W. Early House (Brandywine, Maryland), listed on the NRHP in Prince George's County
- Jubal A. Early House, Boones Mill, Virginia, listed on the NRHP in Franklin County

== See also ==
- Early Hill Plantation, Greensboro, Georgia, listed on the NRHP in Greene County, Georgia
