= Stone Barn =

Stone Barn may refer to:

- James Allen Stone Barn, southeast of Earlham, Iowa
- Stone Barn (Guttenberg, Iowa)
- C.D. Bevington House and Stone Barn, Winterset, Iowa
- Stone Barn Farm, Mount Desert Island, Maine
- J. C. Adams Stone Barn, northeast of Sun River, Montana
- Stone Barns Center for Food & Agriculture, Pocantico Hills, New York
- Daniel E. Krause Stone Barn, Chase, Wisconsin
