= W.T. Ford House =

Historic house in Iowa, United States

- U.S. National Register of Historic Places
- Location within Iowa Location within the United States
- Location: 2½ miles south of Earlham on County Road P57
- Nearest city: Earlham, Iowa
- Coordinates: 41°27′13″N 94°08′06″W
- Area: less than one acre
- Built: c. 1870
- Built by: George Francis; J.G Parkins
- MPS: Legacy in Stone: The Settlement Era of Madison County, Iowa TR
- NRHP reference No.: 87001654
- Added to NRHP: September 29, 1987

The W.T. Ford House is a historic residence located south of Earlham, Iowa, United States. This early example of a vernacular limestone farmhouse was built in three parts. The first section of the house is attributed to George Francis, who was one of the first settlers in the township. This 1 1/2-story section is composed of rubble limestone. The first addition was built onto the south side of the original house. It is also 1 1/2 stories and it is composed of locally quarried finished cut and ashlar limestone. Most of the main facade of this addition has a full-sized enclosed stucco porch.

W.T. Ford bought the property in 1868 from Francis and had the second addition built to the west of the first addition. It is 2 1/2 stories and is composed of ashlar and rubble stone that was quarried at Eureka Quarry in Madison Township. The quarry's owner, J.G Parkins, is credited with building this addition. He may have built the first addition as well. All three sections of the house are capped with gable roofs, and the two additions feature bracketed eaves. Ford was a major player in the area owning 2,000 acres (810 ha), and with his partners, farmed 5,000 acres (2,000 ha). The house was listed on the National Register of Historic Places in 1987.
