= Hogan and Martha A. Runkle Queen House =

Historic house in Iowa, United States

- U.S. National Register of Historic Places
- Location within Iowa Location within the United States
- Location: 5 miles west of St. Charles on County Road G50
- Coordinates: 41°18′05″N 93°53′51″W
- Area: less than one acre
- Built: 1856
- MPS: Legacy in Stone: The Settlement Era of Madison County, Iowa TR
- NRHP reference No.: 87001667
- Added to NRHP: September 29, 1987

The Hogan and Martha A. Runkle Queen House is a historic residence located southeast of Earlham, Iowa, United States. Hogan Queen settled in Madison County in 1853. Within two years he had acquired 900 acres (360 ha) of land, and his land holdings eventually grew to 1,420 acres (570 ha). In addition to farming, Queen was a livestock dealer and he operated a stagecoach stop in his home. The house was also believed to be a stop on the Underground Railroad.

The house is an early example of a vernacular limestone farmhouse. This 2½-story asymmetrical massed rectangular structure is composed of ashlar finished cut quarry faced stone and rubble. The stone may have been quarried on the farm. The house features cut out bargeboards, a protruding water table and lintel course, and a gable roof. It was listed on the National Register of Historic Places in 1987.
