= Peter and Isabelle McCulloch McQuie Milkhouse =

- U.S. National Register of Historic Places
- Location within Iowa Location within the United States
- Location: Southwest of Earlham
- Coordinates: 41°25′51″N 94°09′34″W
- Area: less than one acre
- Built: 1875
- MPS: Legacy in Stone: The Settlement Era of Madison County, Iowa TR
- NRHP reference No.: 87001656
- Added to NRHP: September 29, 1987

The Peter and Isabelle McCulloch McQuie Milkhouse is a historic building located on a farm southwest of Earlham, Iowa, United States. The McQuies were natives of Scotland who immigrated to the US in 1857, and settled in Madison County in 1871. They bought a 320-acre (130 ha) farm that in time grew to 680 acres (280 ha). This building is an early example of a vernacular limestone farm building. The single-story structure is composed of ashlar and rubble stone that might have been quarried at Parkins Quarry in Madison Township. Two-thirds of the building housed the milkhouse. The other third was separated from the milkhouse by a stone wall, and may have housed a hired man. The building was listed on the National Register of Historic Places in 1987.
