= John and Fredericka Meyer Schnellbacher House =

Historic house in Iowa, United States

- U.S. National Register of Historic Places
- Location within Iowa Location within the United States
- Location: On County Road G47 1½ miles east of its junction with County Road P53
- Nearest city: Winterset, Iowa
- Coordinates: 41°17′26″N 94°08′40″W
- Area: less than one acre
- Built: 1856
- MPS: Legacy in Stone: The Settlement Era of Madison County, Iowa TR
- NRHP reference No.: 87001678
- Added to NRHP: September 29, 1987

The John and Fredericka Meyer Schnellbacher House is a historic residence located southwest of Winterset, Iowa, United States. The Schnellbachers were native Germans who settled in Madison County in 1855. He farmed 240 acres (97 ha), and was a preacher affiliated with the Evangelical Association of Ohio. This house is an early example of a vernacular limestone farmhouse. The 1½-story structure is composed of locally quarried stone that is almost ashlar finished and rubble. It features unique window and door surrounds on the main facade, a stone chimney, and an exposed basement. The house was listed on the National Register of Historic Places in 1987.
