= John Andrew and Sara Macumber Ice House =

- John Andrew and Sara Macumber; Ice House
- U.S. National Register of Historic Places
- Location within Iowa Location within the United States
- Location: On County Road G53 1½ miles east of its junction with County Road P69
- Nearest city: Winterset, Iowa
- Coordinates: 41°15′04″N 94°03′56″W
- Area: less than one acre
- MPS: Legacy in Stone: The Settlement Era of Madison County, Iowa TR
- NRHP reference No.: 87001675
- Added to NRHP: March 18, 1993

The John Andrew and Sara Macumber Ice House is a historic building located on a farmstead southwest of Winterset, Iowa, United States. The Macumbers were natives of Gallia County, Ohio, and settled in Madison County in 1853. This building is a fine example of a vernacular limestone farm outbuilding. The single-story, one-room structure is composed of coursed rough cut stone on the main facade, and uncoursed rubble is used on the other elevations. It features quoins and jambs of roughly squared quarry faced stones on the main facade. There is a door on the south gable end, two metal ventilation pipes on the ridge of the roof, and no windows. Built sometime between 1875 and 1885, it is the only stone ice house known to exist in Madison County, and it is one of the few outbuildings built of stone. The ice house is located next to the garage, behind the house. It was listed on the National Register of Historic Places in 1993.
