= Seth and Elizabeth Wilson House =

Historic house in Iowa, United States

- U.S. National Register of Historic Places
- Location within Iowa Location within the United States
- Location: 1¾ miles east of County Road P57 on County Road G14
- Nearest city: Earlham, Iowa
- Coordinates: 41°28′10″N 94°05′39″W
- Area: less than one acre
- Built: 1862
- Built by: Seth Wilson
- MPS: Legacy in Stone: The Settlement Era of Madison County, Iowa TR
- NRHP reference No.: 87001659
- Added to NRHP: September 29, 1987

The Seth and Elizabeth Wilson House is a historic residence located southeast of Earlham, Iowa, United States. Seth settled with relatives in the northwestern part of Madison County in 1854. They acquired 3,000 acres (1,200 ha) of land, of which Wilson himself bought 600 acres (240 ha). He was a Quaker, and he encouraged other Quakers to settle in this area. He was one of the people who developed the town of Earlham, selling the land for its establishment.

The house is an early example of a vernacular limestone farmhouse. This 1½-story structure is composed of ashlar and rubble stone. It is one of the few symmetrically massed rectangular stone houses built in the county. The house was listed on the National Register of Historic Places in 1987.
