= North River Stone Schoolhouse =

- U.S. National Register of Historic Places
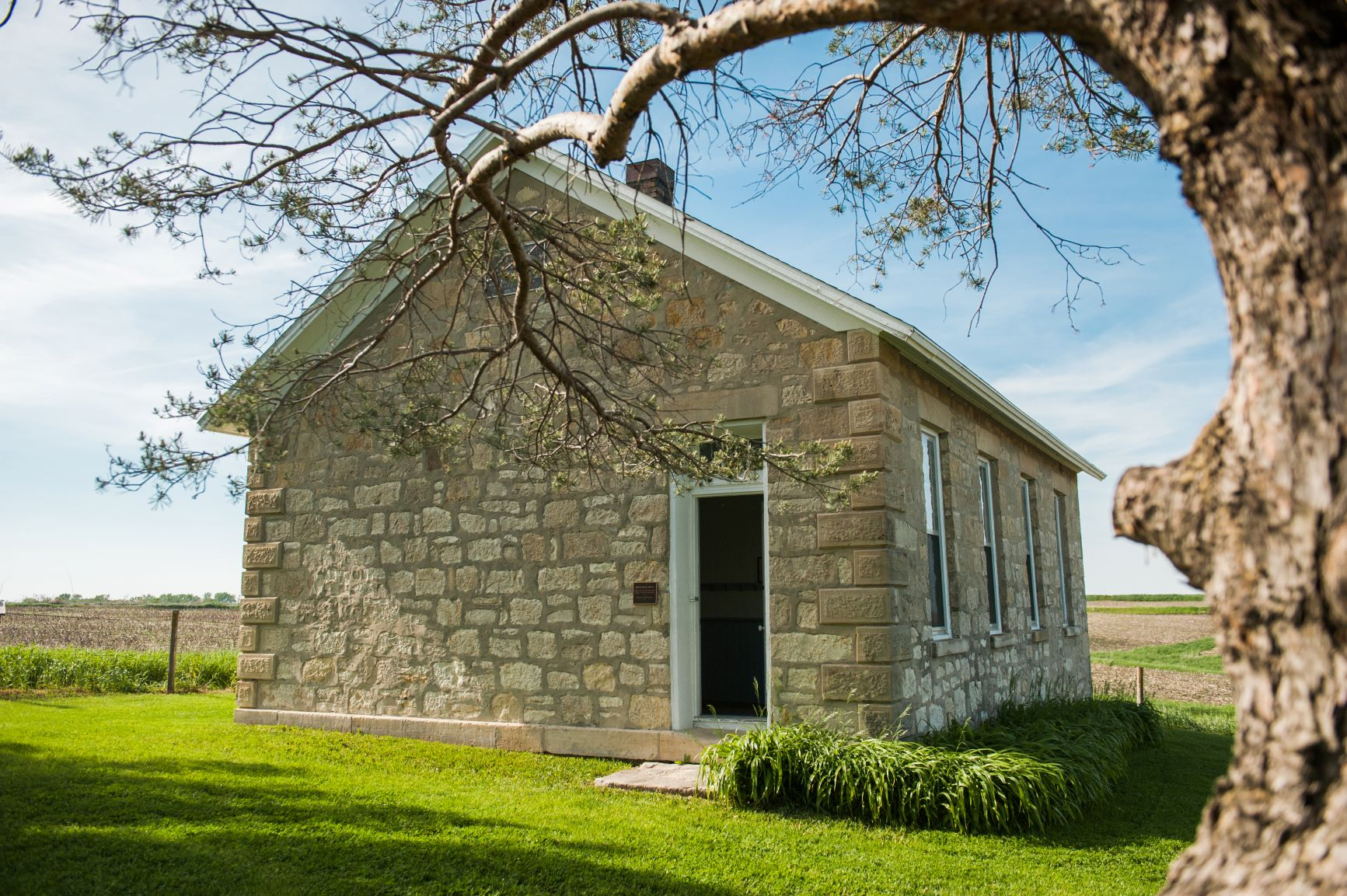

- Location within Iowa Location within the United States
- Location: North of Winterset off U.S. Route 169
- Coordinates: 41°24′10″N 94°02′32″W
- Area: less than one acre
- Built: 1874
- MPS: Legacy in Stone: The Settlement Era of Madison County, Iowa TR
- NRHP reference No.: 77000537
- Added to NRHP: April 11, 1977

The North River Stone Schoolhouse is a historic building located north of Winterset, Iowa, United States. Built in 1874 of coursed native limestone, the one-room schoolhouse educated local students until it closed in 1945. The building features quoining on the four corners of the exterior, four windows capped with stone lintels on the east and west elevations, and an off-center doorway on the main (south) facade. From 1962 to 1973 the building was restored, and it opened as a school museum operated by the Madison County Historical Society. The building was listed on the National Register of Historic Places in 1977.
