= W.J. and Nettie J. Cornell House =

Historic house in Iowa, United States

- U.S. National Register of Historic Places
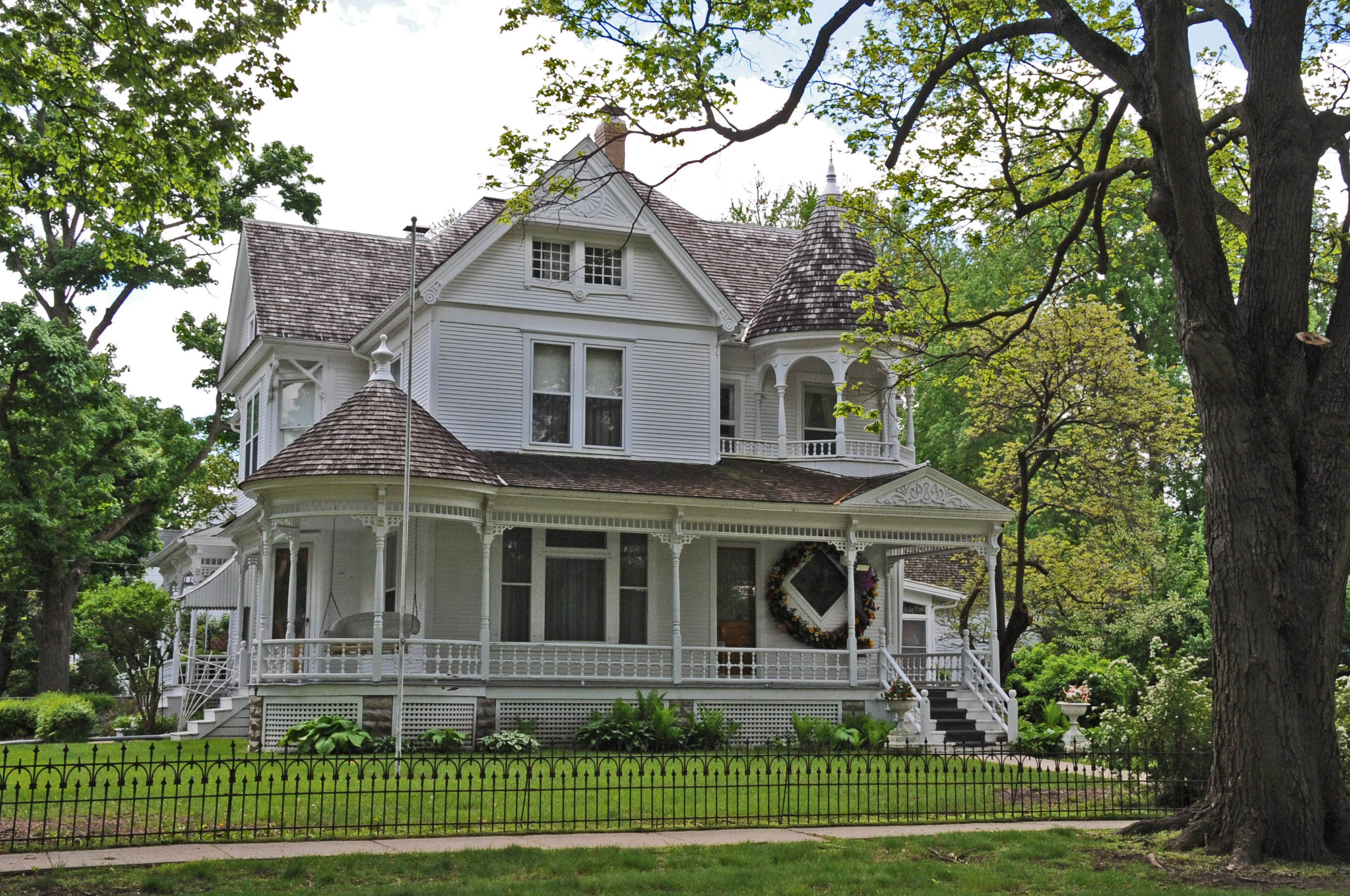

- Location within Iowa Location within the United States
- Location: 602 W. Court Ave. Winterset, Iowa
- Coordinates: 41°20′03″N 94°01′15″W
- Area: less than one acre
- Built: 1896
- Built by: Fred Lewis
- Architectural style: Queen Anne
- NRHP reference No.: 90002132
- Added to NRHP: January 11, 1991

The W.J. and Nettie J. Cornell House, also known as the Samuel G. & Sophia J. Ruby House, and the A. W. & Martha A. Crawford House, is a historic residence located in Winterset, Iowa, United States. Cornell was a banker who hired local contractor Fred Lewis to erect this Queen Anne house from 1893 to 1896. He and his wife lived here for a couple of years when they sold the house to the Rubeys for $5,000 in 1898. Samuel Ruby was a railroad lawyer who served as Consul to Belfast during the Benjamin Harrison administration. The wrap-around porch was added to the house during the Ruby's occupancy. A. W. Crawford was a grocer who acquired his wealth through land speculation in Texas, while living in Winterset. He was known for his local philanthropy.

The 2½-story frame house follows an asymmetrical design that is planned around a simple cross-gable system. It features a facade projection and a second-floor porch on the main facade. The house was listed on the National Register of Historic Places in 1991.
