= George and Susan Guiberson Armstrong House =

Historic house in Iowa, United States

- U.S. National Register of Historic Places
- Location within Iowa Location within the United States
- Location: 2½ miles north of Winterset on G4R
- Coordinates: 41°23′18″N 93°58′26″W
- Area: less than one acre
- Built: 1856
- Built by: George Armstrong
- MPS: Legacy in Stone: The Settlement Era of Madison County, Iowa TR
- NRHP reference No.: 87001668
- Added to NRHP: September 29, 1987

The George and Susan Guiberson Armstrong House is a historic residence located north of Winterset, Iowa, United States. George Armstrong was a native of Ireland who settled with his wife Susan in Madison County in 1853. He bought 40 acres (16 ha) of land in 1855 on which he built this house a year later. In 1875, he still owned the same 40 acres, which suggests the Armstrongs were people of modest means. The house is an early example of a vernacular limestone farmhouse. This single-story, one room structure is composed of roughly squared quarry faced and rubble limestone that was laid in courses in a random bond. It features quoins and door jambs that are composed of roughly squared quarry faced stone, and lintels and window sills of wood. The house was listed on the National Register of Historic Places in 1987.
