= Miller Bridge (Winterset, Iowa) =

- U.S. National Register of Historic Places
- Location within Iowa Location within the United States
- Location: McBride Trail over an unnamed stream
- Nearest city: Winterset, Iowa
- Coordinates: 41°24′45″N 93°56′34″W
- Area: less than one acre
- Built: 1884
- Built by: H.P. Jones; G.K. Foster
- Architect: King Iron Bridge & Manufacturing Company
- Architectural style: Pratt pony truss
- MPS: Highway Bridges of Iowa MPS
- NRHP reference No.: 98000508
- Added to NRHP: May 15, 1998

The Miller Bridge is a historic structure, originally located northeast of Winterset, Iowa, United States. It spanned an unnamed stream for 128 feet (39 m). The Madison County Board of Supervisors contracted with King and Twiss of Des Moines to supply the wrought iron Pratt pony truss. Local contractors H.P. Jones and G.K. Foster built the iron tube substructure and erected the truss manufactured by the King Iron Bridge & Manufacturing Company of Cleveland. The total cost of the project was $2,197.55. The bridge was listed on the National Register of Historic Places in 1998. The span was moved in 2008.
