= Guiberson House =

Historic house in Iowa, United States

- U.S. National Register of Historic Places
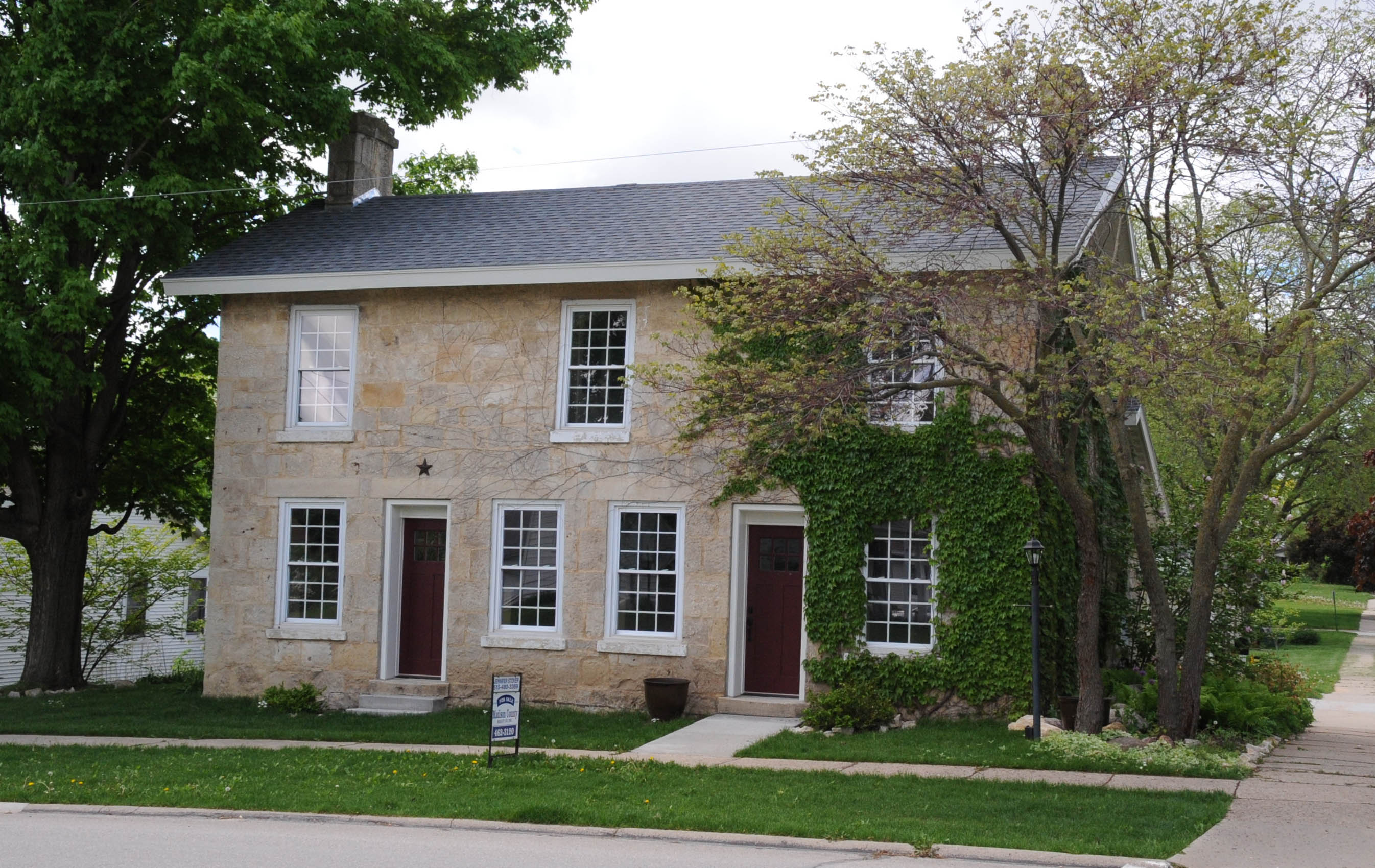

- Location within Iowa Location within the United States
- Location: 302 S. 4th Ave. Winterset, Iowa
- Coordinates: 41°19′56.5″N 94°01′06″W
- Area: less than one acre
- Built: 1861-1865
- Built by: Caleb Clark
- NRHP reference No.: 79003697
- Added to NRHP: July 10, 1979

The Guiberson House is a historic residence located in Winterset, Iowa, United States. Edwin R. Guiberson settled in Winterset in the late 1840s, and worked as a lot agent selling property after the town was platted. He also served a term as County Judge. Calib Clark, a local stonemason, is credited with building this house from 1861 to 1865. The two-story structure is composed of locally quarried limestone that is laid in a random ashlar pattern. The five bay facade features entry ways in the second and fourth bays. The house was listed on the National Register of Historic Places in 1979.
