= Hiram C. Smith House =

Historic house in Iowa, United States

- U.S. National Register of Historic Places
- Location within Iowa Location within the United States
- Location: 6 miles west of Winterset on Iowa Highway 92
- Coordinates: 41°19′47″N 94°08′30″W
- Area: less than one acre
- Built: 1856
- Built by: Hiram C. Smith
- MPS: Legacy in Stone: The Settlement Era of Madison County, Iowa TR
- NRHP reference No.: 87001684
- Added to NRHP: September 29, 1987

The Hiram C. Smith House is a historic residence located west of Winterset, Iowa, United States. Smith was one of the earliest settlers in this township, having acquired the deed to the 280-acre (110 ha) farm between 1854 and 1856. This house is an early example of a vernacular limestone farmhouse. It is a 1½-story, one-room structure composed of rubble stone quarried on the farm and laid in a random bond. Its construction is attributed to Smith, as its rough and simple construction do not reflect the work of any of the stonemasons working in the county at the time it was built. The house was listed on the National Register of Historic Places in 1987. His milking shed, built about the same time and on the same property, is also listed on the National Register.
