= William and Mary (Messersmith) Seerley Barn and Milkhouse-Smokehouse =

- U.S. National Register of Historic Places
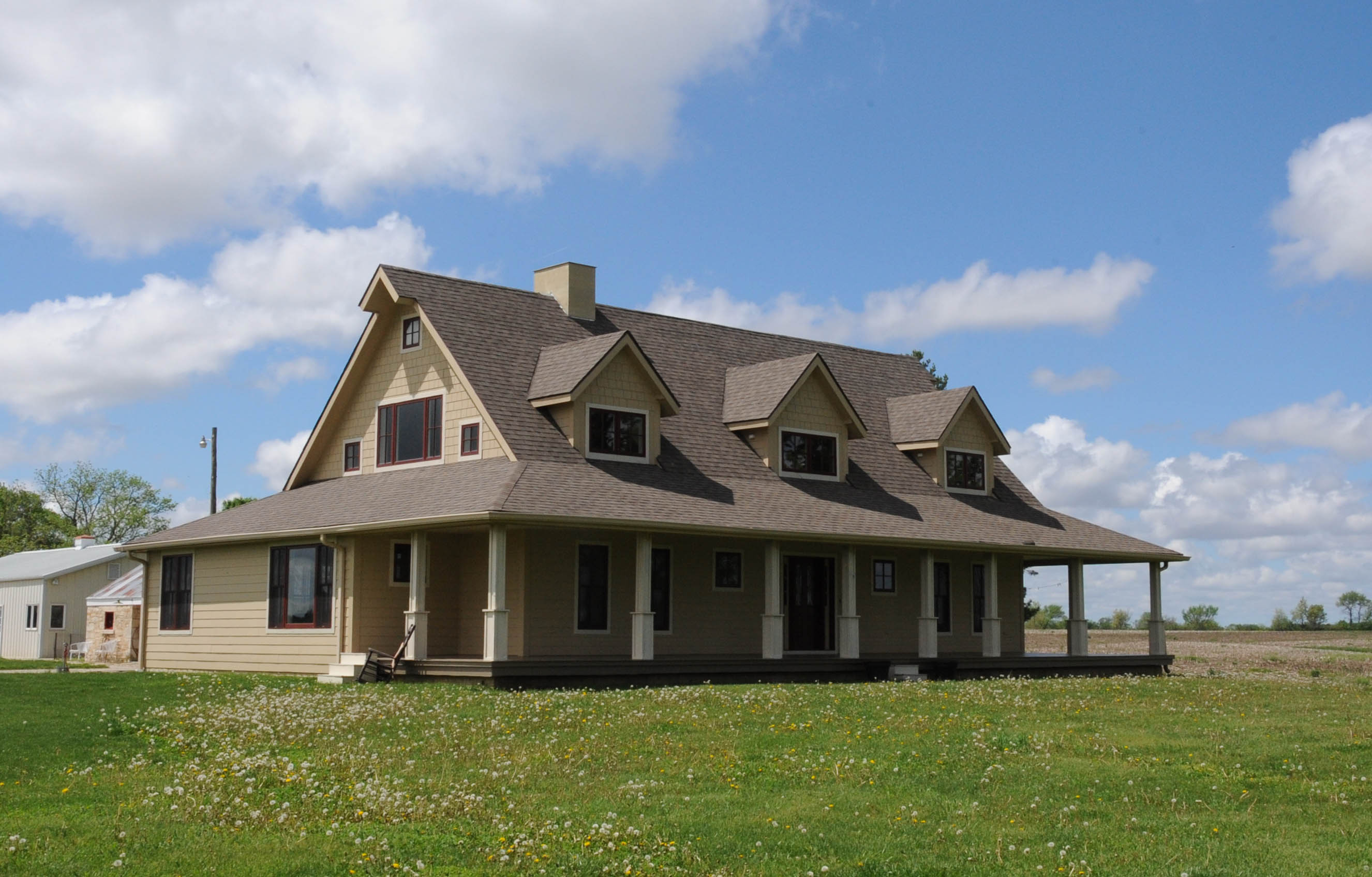

- Location within Iowa Location within the United States
- Location: 1840 137th Lane
- Nearest city: Earlham, Iowa
- Coordinates: 41°26′45″N 94°05′24″W
- Area: 2.5 acres (1.0 ha)
- Built: 1860 (Milkhouse/ Smokehouse); 1876 (Barn)
- NRHP reference No.: 09000621
- Added to NRHP: August 20, 2009

The William and Mary (Messersmith) Seerley Barn and Milkhouse-Smokehouse are historic buildings located on a farm southwest of Earlham, Iowa, United States. The Seerleys moved from Indiana and settled on their 200-acre (81 ha) farm in 1856, and built a log cabin the same year as their residence. They built a permanent home in 1861, and around the same time the combination milkhouse and smokehouse was built. The barn followed around 1876. These two buildings are early examples of well preserved agricultural building. The two rooms of the milkhouse-smokehouse sit at right angles from each other. The single-story structure is composed of finished cut rubble. It features a stone lined well, water troughs that cooled and stored dairy products, the smokehouse, and a covered outdoor work area where food was processed and laundry. The Sweitzer Pennsylvania barn is composed of native limestone on the lower level, and a heavy timber haymow with forebay on the upper level. It was built into the side of a south facing hill, and the forebay extends 8 feet (2.4 m) on the south side. The buildings and the connecting stone walkway were listed together on the National Register of Historic Places in 2009.
