= Henry and Elizabeth Adkinson Evans House =

Historic house in Iowa, United States

- U.S. National Register of Historic Places
- Location within Iowa Location within the United States
- Location: ½ mile east of U.S. Route 169 on County Road G50
- Nearest city: Winterset, Iowa
- Coordinates: 41°18′42″N 93°59′33″W
- Area: less than one acre
- Built: 1885
- MPS: Legacy in Stone: The Settlement Era of Madison County, Iowa TR
- NRHP reference No.: 87001674
- Added to NRHP: September 29, 1987

The Henry and Elizabeth Adkinson Evans House is a historic residence located south of Winterset, Iowa, United States. Henry Evans settled in the Madison County with his mother when he was 14. He farmed 175 acres (71 ha) of her land and then inherited 100 acres (40 ha) when she died in 1875. He opened a quarry, cut the stone, and built this house in 1885. It was the last house that was built of quarried native limestone constructed by local builders. The house is a square, two-story structure that is composed of ashlar stone, and capped with a hip roof. It was listed on the National Register of Historic Places in 1987.
