= William D. Bond =

American mechanical engineer

William D. Bond (born January 2, 1931) is an American inventor and mechanical engineer who retired from General Motors after spending his entire career with the car maker. He is most noted for his innovative work on intake manifolds, a three-wheeled concept car, and early electric cars in the 1960s.

== Background ==
William Dale Bond was born January 2, 1931, in Winterset, Iowa to Dale Bond, an entrepreneur and Myrtle Swedlund Bond, a music teacher. He graduated from Iowa State University in 1960 with a BS degree in Engineering and is a member of the Iowa State University chapter of Tau Beta Pi, an engineering society for academic excellence. In the early 1950s, he raced on the Bonneville Salt Flats in Utah. He was one of the charter members of the Ames, Iowa hot rod club and the Night Crawlers in the mid-1950s. Bond served as a ballistic meteorologist for the National Guard during the Korean War era.

== Career ==
A member of the engineering staff, Bond worked for General Motors (GM) from July 1960 until his retirement in February 1993. His early work involved one of GM's earliest electric cars, the Electrovair II, a 1966 Corvair Monza sedan powered by silver-zinc batteries. The battery pack gave the Electrovair II a similar performance to that of the conventional gasoline powered Corvair which the car was based on with a top speed of 80 mph. As the project manager of the Electrovair II, Bond served as the spokesperson and driver when the car was demonstrated to the press in October 1966. It is the oldest historic vehicle on display at the GM Heritage Center in Sterling Heights, Michigan. Bond then worked with the Electrovan, which is credited as the world's first hydrogen fuel cell powered vehicle. The Electrovan had a top speed of 70 mph, was able to accelerate from 0-60 mph in 30 seconds and had a range of 120 to 150 miles. It is currently on display at the GM Heritage Center in Sterling Heights, Michigan.

Bond received his first patent in 1968 for a Mounting and Cooling Apparatus for Semiconductor Devices. This apparatus cools the electrical switching device. He was featured on the cover of August 15, 1972, issue of Automotive Industries magazine in a feature story about Early Fuel Evaporation which General Motors received a patent for in 1973. In 1975, he received a patent for a Quick Warm-up Intake Manifold. This is a temperature control system that allows the heat to be directed to the intake manifold when the engine is cold.
