= Seymour Church House =

Historic house in Iowa, United States

- U.S. National Register of Historic Places
- Location within Iowa Location within the United States
- Location: U.S. Route 169
- Nearest city: Winterset, Iowa
- Coordinates: 41°24′08″N 94°02′25″W
- Area: less than one acre
- Built: 1865
- MPS: Legacy in Stone: The Settlement Era of Madison County, Iowa TR
- NRHP reference No.: 87001683
- Added to NRHP: September 29, 1987

The Seymour Church House is a historic residence located north of Winterset, Iowa, United States. Samuel Stover originally acquired 160 acres (65 ha) of land in 1854, and it includes the property the house was built on. The property was transferred to Matilda Stover before Seymour Church acquired it. The house is an early example of a vernacular limestone farmhouse. It is sited on the side of a hill south of the road and facing a stream. The north elevation reveals only the second floor, while the south side reveals it to be a 2½-story house. It is composed of locally quarried finished cut and rubble limestone. The house was listed on the National Register of Historic Places in 1987.
