= Nicholas Schoenenberger House and Barn =

Historic house in Iowa, United States

- U.S. National Register of Historic Places
- Location within Iowa Location within the United States
- Location: Off Iowa Highway 169
- Nearest city: Winterset, Iowa
- Coordinates: 41°13′17″N 93°59′58″W
- Area: 1.25 acres (0.51 ha)
- MPS: Legacy in Stone: The Settlement Era of Madison County, Iowa TR
- NRHP reference No.: 84001275
- Added to NRHP: July 12, 1984

The Nicholas Schoenenberger House and Barn is a historic residence located south of Winterset, Iowa, United States. Nicholas and Louisa (Tinnis) Schoenenberger were both natives of what is now Germany and acquired the title to this farm in 1856. He worked the land until the late nineteenth century, and died here in 1902. Since his death the house has been vacant for long periods of time. This house is an early example of a vernacular limestone farmhouse. The two-story gable structure is composed of locally quarried finished cut stone on the public facades, the quoins, and the jambs. Rubble stone is used on the other elevations. It also features dressed lintels and window sills. Because it is located on a south facing hillside, the house has a split-level appearance. Because it shares characteristics with other stone houses built in Madison County by local stonemason Caleb Clark, he may have been responsible for its construction. The lower level of the English-style barn is composed of coursed limestone rubble, and the upper level is composed of board-and-batten siding. It is located in a German-style hill setting. The house and barn were listed together on the National Register of Historic Places in 1984.
