= John M. Duncan House =

Historic house in Iowa, United States

- U.S. National Register of Historic Places
- Location within Iowa Location within the United States
- Location: ½ mile south of Winterset on County Road P69
- Coordinates: 41°19′12″N 94°01′00″W
- Area: less than one acre
- Built: 1866
- Architectural style: Vernacular
- MPS: Legacy in Stone: The Settlement Era of Madison County, Iowa TR
- NRHP reference No.: 87001673
- Added to NRHP: September 29, 1987

The John M. Duncan House is a historic house located half a mile south of Winterset, Iowa.

== Description and history ==
Duncan acquired this land from Canada Fink in 1866, and the house was built sometime after that. It is an early example of a vernacular limestone farmhouse. The house is a single-story, one-room structure with a raised basement. The exterior is composed of large rubble stone laid in an uncoursed broken bond that gives it a wave-like appearance. The house was listed on the National Register of Historic Places on September 29, 1987.
