= Daniel and Nancy Swaford Henderson House =

Historic house in Iowa, United States

- U.S. National Register of Historic Places
- Location within Iowa Location within the United States
- Location: 8 miles south of Earlham on County Road P57
- Coordinates: 41°22′37″N 94°07′55″W
- Area: less than one acre
- Built: 1856
- MPS: Legacy in Stone: The Settlement Era of Madison County, Iowa TR
- NRHP reference No.: 87001655
- Added to NRHP: September 29, 1987

The Daniel and Nancy Swaford Henderson House is a historic residence located south of Earlham, Iowa, United States. The Hendersons, who were married in 1851, were one of the first three families to settle in the township in 1853. The house they built is an early example of a vernacular limestone farmhouse. This 1½-story structure features a main facade of locally quarried beige finished cut stone that they unsuccessful tried to lay in courses. The other three elevations are composed of rubble stone. The house is built on a raised basement, and capped with a gable roof. It is located on a very long drive off of a gravel road. The house was listed on the National Register of Historic Places in 1987.
