= Miles and Elizabeth Smith Kellogg House =

Historic house in Iowa, United States

- U.S. National Register of Historic Places
- Location within Iowa Location within the United States
- Location: Off County Road G50
- Nearest city: Winterset, Iowa
- Coordinates: 41°19′4.2″N 93°59′1.1″W
- Area: less than one acre
- Built: c. 1857
- MPS: Legacy in Stone: The Settlement Era of Madison County, Iowa TR
- NRHP reference No.: 87002140
- Added to NRHP: June 19, 2017

The Miles and Elizabeth Smith Kellogg House is a historic building located southwest of Winterset in rural Madison County, Iowa, United States. It was studied as part of the thematic resource, Legacy in Stone: The Settlement Era of Madison County, Iowa. The buildings in the study are located near extensive limestone deposits that were used by the early settlers of the county who possessed the financial means to build their houses and other buildings. Miles Kellogg bought a 160-acre (65 ha) farm from Oliver Smith and built this stone house, settling here in 1857. It is a variation of the split-level home that was realized on the exterior. It had a raised basement with the entrance to the main floor on the gable end and was a one-half flight above ground level. The main family entrance was a one-half flight below ground to the basement. The lower level, which contained a main family room-kitchen combination, was plastered the same as the main level, which was where the formal parlor was located. It also had a finished attic. The exterior was composed of rubblestone on the back and sidewalls and finished cut and quarry-faced stone on the main facade. The trim is simple. The house was listed on the National Register of Historic Places in 2017.
