= John S. and Elizabeth Beem Holmes Barn =

- U.S. National Register of Historic Places
- Location within Iowa Location within the United States
- Location: County Road G50
- Nearest city: St. Charles, Iowa
- Coordinates: 41°17′00″N 93°57′13″W
- Area: less than one acre
- Built: 1875
- MPS: Legacy in Stone: The Settlement Era of Madison County, Iowa TR
- NRHP reference No.: 87001665
- Added to NRHP: September 29, 1987

The John S. and Elizabeth Beem Holmes Barn is a historic building located on a farm southwest of St. Charles, Iowa, United States. The Holmes' settled in Madison County in 1854 from Indiana. Their initial 40-acre (16 ha) farm eventually expanded to a 350 acres (140 ha). John Holmes farmed, raised livestock, and held several local offices in the community. This building is a fine example of a vernacular limestone farm building. The 1½-story structure is composed of large blocks of locally quarried finished cut stone. It is equivalent in height to a three-story building. There was an attempt some time ago to stucco the structure in order to preserve the stone, however, a storm a few hours after it was applied washed most of it off. It was listed on the National Register of Historic Places in 1987.
