= Miller Richard and Mary Fisher Tidrick House =

Historic house in Iowa, United States

- U.S. National Register of Historic Places
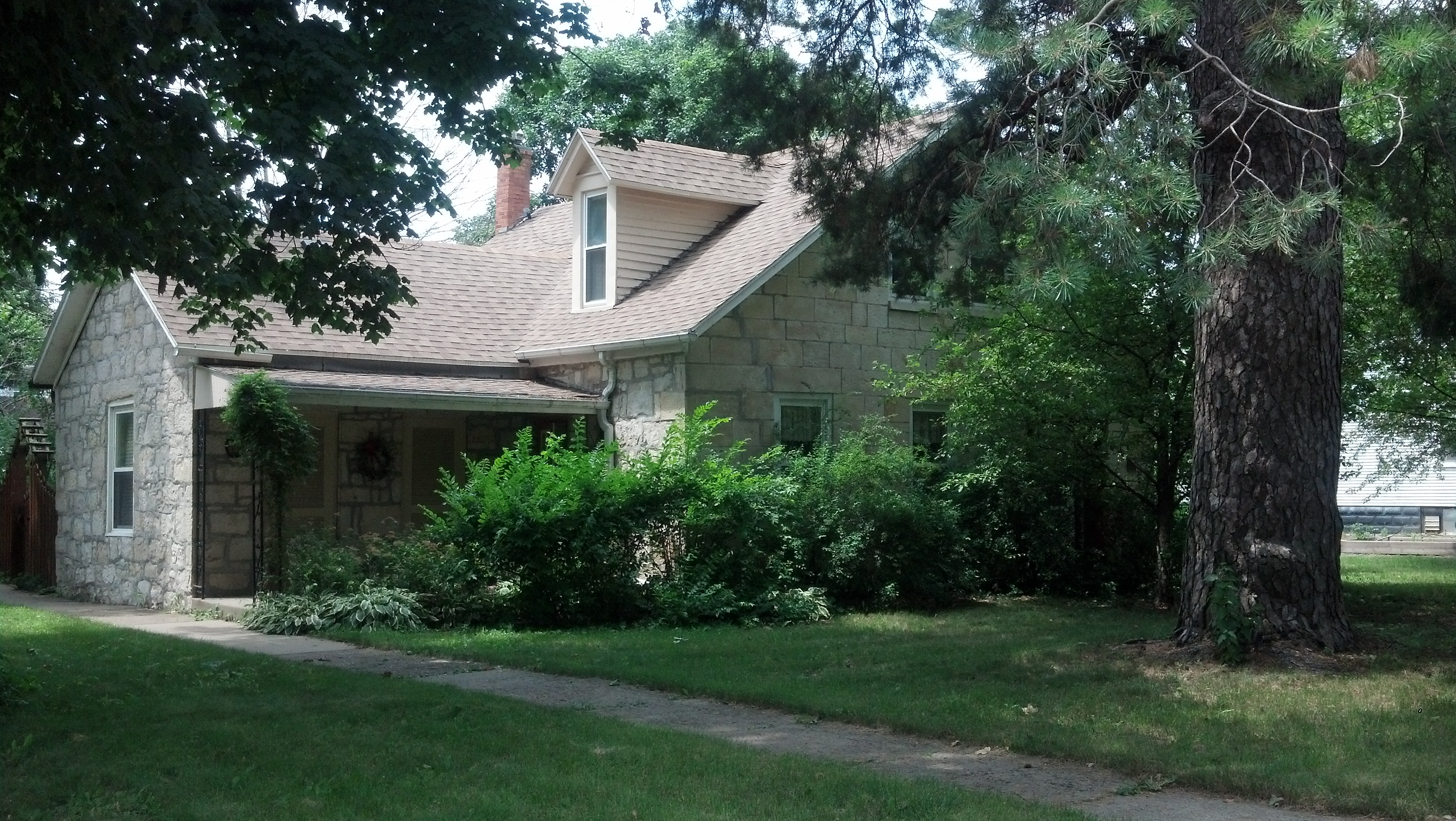

- Location within Iowa Location within the United States
- Location: 122 S. 4th Ave. Winterset, Iowa
- Coordinates: 41°20′01″N 94°01′06″W
- Area: less than one acre
- Built: c. 1865
- MPS: Legacy in Stone: The Settlement Era of Madison County, Iowa TR
- NRHP reference No.: 93000126
- Added to NRHP: March 18, 1993

The Miller Richard and Mary Fisher Tidrick House is a historic residence located in Winterset, Iowa, United States. Miller Tidrick was an Ohio native who settled in Winterset in 1858 and was a member of a well-connected family in town. He served in the 3rd Iowa Volunteer Infantry Regiment during the American Civil War, and married Mary Fisher from the Adel area after being discharged for unknown health reasons in 1862. That same year he established a grocery business in town. In addition to being a businessman, he was involved in several community organizations. This house was built about 1856, and the Tidricks lived here until they moved to a farm in 1882 where he died in 1914.

This 1½-story structure is composed of locally quarried limestone. The house originally had two bedrooms and because the Tidricks had seven children, additions were added. An ell was added on the south side sometime before 1869. Another wing was added to the west before 1879. The house was listed on the National Register of Historic Places in 1993.
