= Earlham Public School =

- U.S. National Register of Historic Places
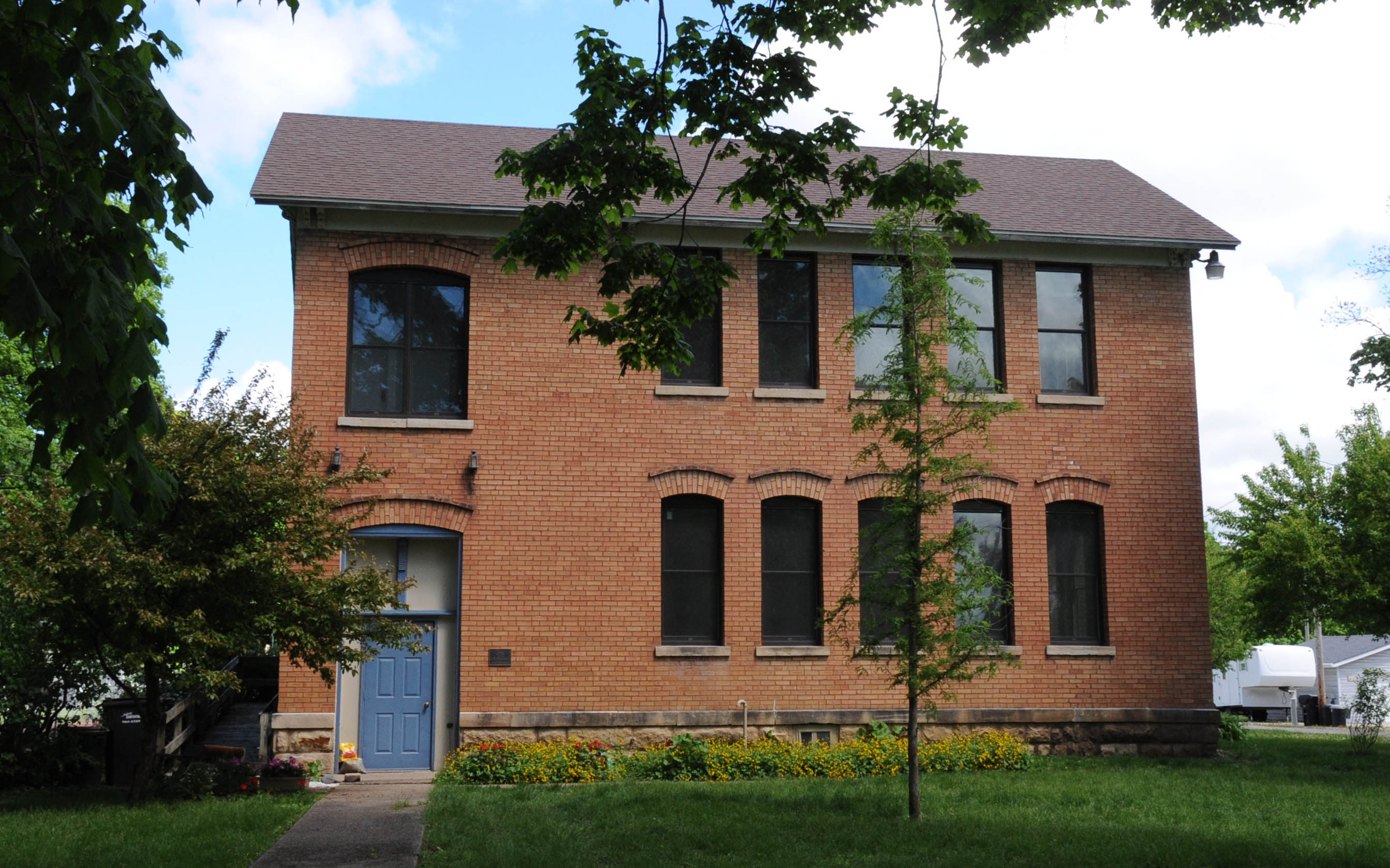
- The brick addition to the school.

- Location within Iowa Location within the United States
- Location: 809 Main St. Earlham, Iowa
- Coordinates: 41°29′31″N 94°07′16″W
- Area: less than one acre
- Built: 1871
- Built by: Jennings P. Osborn
- MPS: Legacy in Stone: The Settlement Era of Madison County, Iowa TR
- NRHP reference No.: 82002631
- Added to NRHP: June 2, 1982

The Earlham Public School is a historic building located in Earlham, Iowa, United States. The town's name was chosen by the Quakers, who were the largest group of settlers in the community. They named it for Earlham College in Richmond, Indiana because they intended to establish a similar institution in the town. Fundraising got underway in 1869, and the following year plans were made to establish a public befitting a college town. Earlham Public School open in 1871. Jennings P. Osborn, a local builder, constructed the two-story structure of smooth-faced limestone that rests on rusticated limestone foundation. The building soon proved to be too small and a brick addition was added to the south side of the original building.

The college plans fell through because of a lack of financing. The Quakers founded Earlham Academy in 1892 hoping it would grow into a college, but it did not. They sold the building to the local public school in 1900, and they used it for a high school. This building was used by the elementary grades. School districts were consolidated in 1920 and a larger building that could accommodate all grades was built in Earlham. This building was used from that point as a Masonic lodge until it was converted into a local museum. The building was listed on the National Register of Historic Places in 1982.
