= Hiram C. Smith Milking Shed =

- U.S. National Register of Historic Places
- Location within Iowa Location within the United States
- Location: 6 miles west of Winterset on Iowa Highway 92
- Coordinates: 41°19′47″N 94°08′32″W
- Area: less than one acre
- Built: 1856
- Built by: Hiram C. Smith
- MPS: Legacy in Stone: The Settlement Era of Madison County, Iowa TR
- NRHP reference No.: 87001686
- Added to NRHP: September 29, 1987

The Hiram C. Smith Milking Shed is a historic building located west of Winterset, Iowa, United States. Smith was one of the earliest settlers in this township, having acquired the deed to the 280-acre (110 ha) farm between 1854 and 1856. This building is an early example of a vernacular limestone farm building. It is a single-story, gabled structure composed of rubble stone that was quarried along the Middle River on the farm and laid in a random bond. Its construction is attributed to Smith, as its rough and simple construction do not reflect the work of any of the stonemasons working in the county at the time it was built. The milking shed was listed on the National Register of Historic Places in 1987. His single-room house, built about the same time, is also listed on the National Register.
