= J.G. and Elizabeth S. Vawter House =

Historic house in Iowa, United States

- U.S. National Register of Historic Places
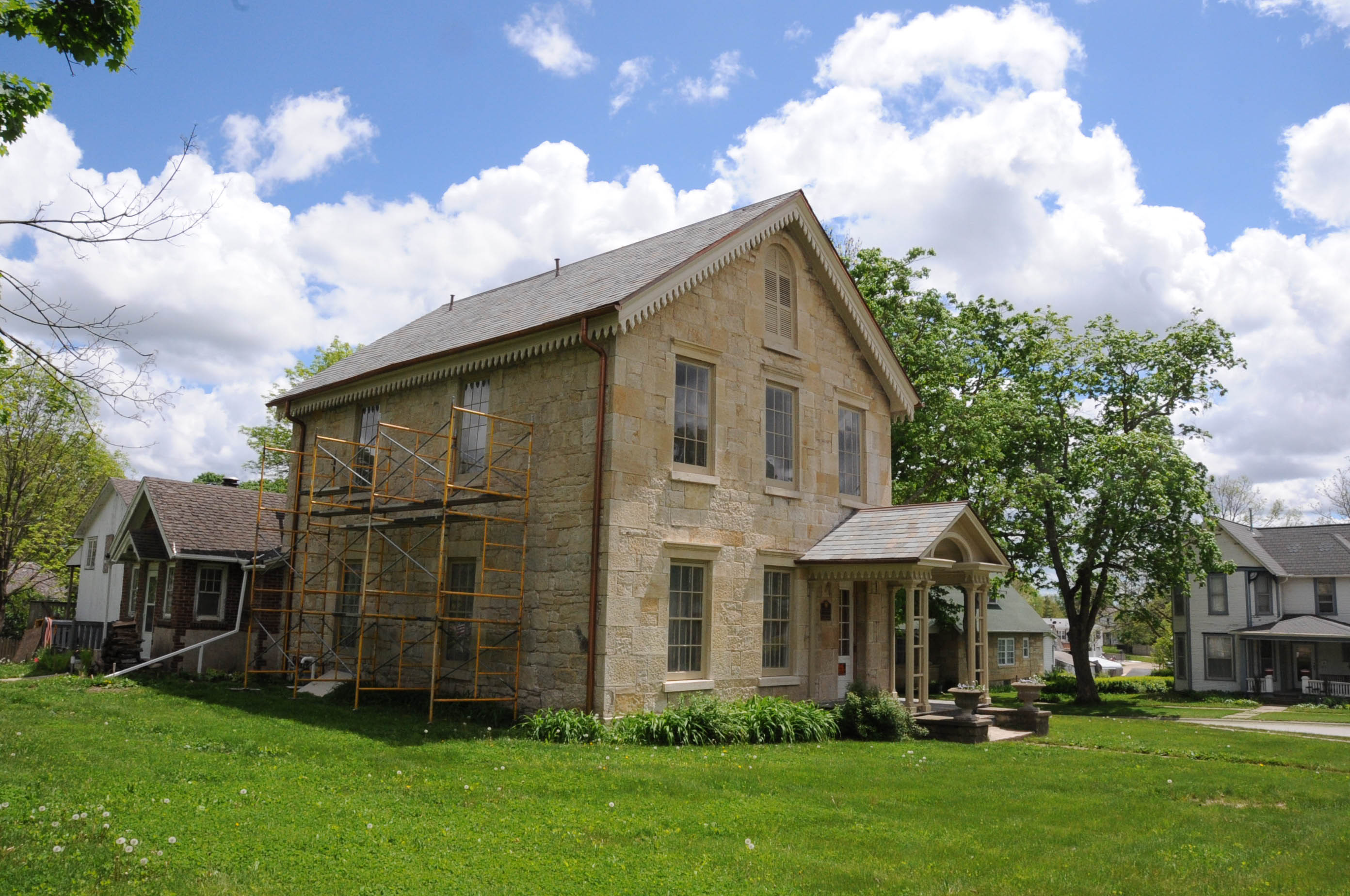

- Location within Iowa Location within the United States
- Location: 223 S. 1st St. Winterset, Iowa
- Coordinates: 41°19′58″N 94°00′46″W
- Area: less than one acre
- Built: 1856
- Built by: Caleb Clark
- MPS: Legacy in Stone: The Settlement Era of Madison County, Iowa TR
- NRHP reference No.: 87001692
- Added to NRHP: September 29, 1987

The J.G. and Elizabeth S. Vawter House is a historic residence located in Winterset, Iowa, United States. J.G. Vawter settled in Winterset in 1854 and was a local merchant. His wife Elizabeth owned this house. They left the community sometime before 1865. This 2½-story structure is composed of locally quarried limestone. Its construction is attributed to Caleb Clark, and it is the first mansion built in Madison County. It features a main entry with a protruding arched, hood mold and a fan-shaped transom, large windows on the south elevation, lintels with cornices, two stone chimneys, a louvred attic window, and icicle-shaped bargeboards. The house was listed on the National Register of Historic Places in 1987.
