= Bricker-Price Block =

- U.S. National Register of Historic Places
- Location within Iowa Location within the United States
- Location: 105-115 S. Chestnut Ave., Earlham, Iowa
- Coordinates: 41°29′28.9″N 94°07′23.9″W
- Area: less than one acre
- Built: 1900
- Built by: J.E. Walton
- Architectural style: Romanesque
- NRHP reference No.: 100000487
- Added to NRHP: January 17, 2017

The Bricker-Price Block is a historic building located in Earlham, Iowa, United States. It was built in 1900 by J.E. Walton. The building was jointly owned by its namesakes Cephas D. Bricker and Walter J. Price. They each owned a separate half of the building. Its unified facade features two mirror images with a central staircase in between. It is one of the oldest Romanesque Revival structures remaining in Earlham's central business district. The main-level storefronts originally housed general stores with other commercial interests taking their places over time. The second-floor originally housed offices, but they were later converted into five apartments. The building suffered significant water damage when a storm lifted the roof off in the spring of 2015. A nonprofit corporation was formed by the community to restore the building. It was listed on the National Register of Historic Places in 2017.
