= J.D. Craven Women's Relief Corps Hall =

- U.S. National Register of Historic Places
- Location within Iowa Location within the United States
- Location: South St. Macksburg, Iowa
- Coordinates: 41°12′50″N 94°11′06.5″W
- Area: less than one acre
- Built: 1901
- NRHP reference No.: 84001274
- Added to NRHP: January 19, 1984

The J.D. Craven Women's Relief Corps Hall is a historic building located in Macksburg, Iowa, United States. The J. D. Craven Post #198 of the Grand Army of the Republic (GAR) was organized in 1883. They organized an auxiliary, the J.D. Craven Post #322 of the Women's Relief Corps (WRC), in 1898. They built this two-story frame building in 1901 with donated labor and lumber. It is a rare example of a vaulted roof commercial building. In addition to the functions of the WRC, the building has also served as a community building. It also housed the local public school during the 1920–21 school year when their new building was under construction. The WRC continued in existence, even after the GAR folded. When the hall was nominated for National Register of Historic Places, the J.D. Craven Post was still in existence. It was the only one left in Madison County, and one of 34 in Iowa at that time. They added seasonal assistance to the elderly to their aid for veterans. The building was listed on the National Register in 1984.
