= John and Elizabeth McMurn Early House =

Historic house in Iowa, United States

- U.S. National Register of Historic Places
- Location within Iowa Location within the United States
- Location: 1 mile south of County Road G31 between County Roads P53 and P57
- Nearest city: Earlham, Iowa
- Coordinates: 41°23′21″N 94°09′27″W
- Area: less than one acre
- Built: c. 1865
- MPS: Legacy in Stone: The Settlement Era of Madison County, Iowa TR
- NRHP reference No.: 87001653
- Added to NRHP: March 18, 1993

The John and Elizabeth McMurn Early House is a historic residence located south of Earlham, Iowa, United States. The Earlys settled in Madison County in 1855 from Eddyville, Iowa. They bought 160 acres (65 ha) of raw prairie and established a farm. This was the second house built on the property, and it was unusual for a "second generation" farm house in Central Iowa to be built of stone around the time of the Civil War. The Earlys were Presbyterians and held services in the house until a church was built. John Early was an ardent Republican and abolitionist who was active in the Underground Railroad. While "it is said, had as many as five runaway slaves on his place at one time", there is no evidence this house itself was a stop. The Earlys lived here until their deaths in 1872 (Elizabeth) and 1873 (John). The house was listed on the National Register of Historic Places in 1993.
