= William Anzi Nichols House =

Historic house in Iowa, United States

- U.S. National Register of Historic Places
- Location within Iowa Location within the United States
- Location: 1 mile east of Winterset on Iowa Highway 92
- Coordinates: 41°20′42″N 94°59′57″W
- Area: less than one acre
- Built: 1856
- Built by: David Harris
- MPS: Legacy in Stone: The Settlement Era of Madison County, Iowa TR
- NRHP reference No.: 87001677
- Added to NRHP: September 29, 1987

The William Anzi Nichols House is a historic residence located east of Winterset, Iowa, United States. Nichols bought an 80 acres (32 ha) farm in 1855 and owned the land until he died in 1867. This house is an early example of a vernacular limestone farmhouse. The 1½-story structure is composed of locally quarried finished cut and rubble limestone. Its construction is attributed to David Harris who was known for laying the stones in a two against one broken bond. The house was listed on the National Register of Historic Places in 1987.
