= William R. and Martha Foster Shriver House =

Historic house in Iowa, United States

- U.S. National Register of Historic Places
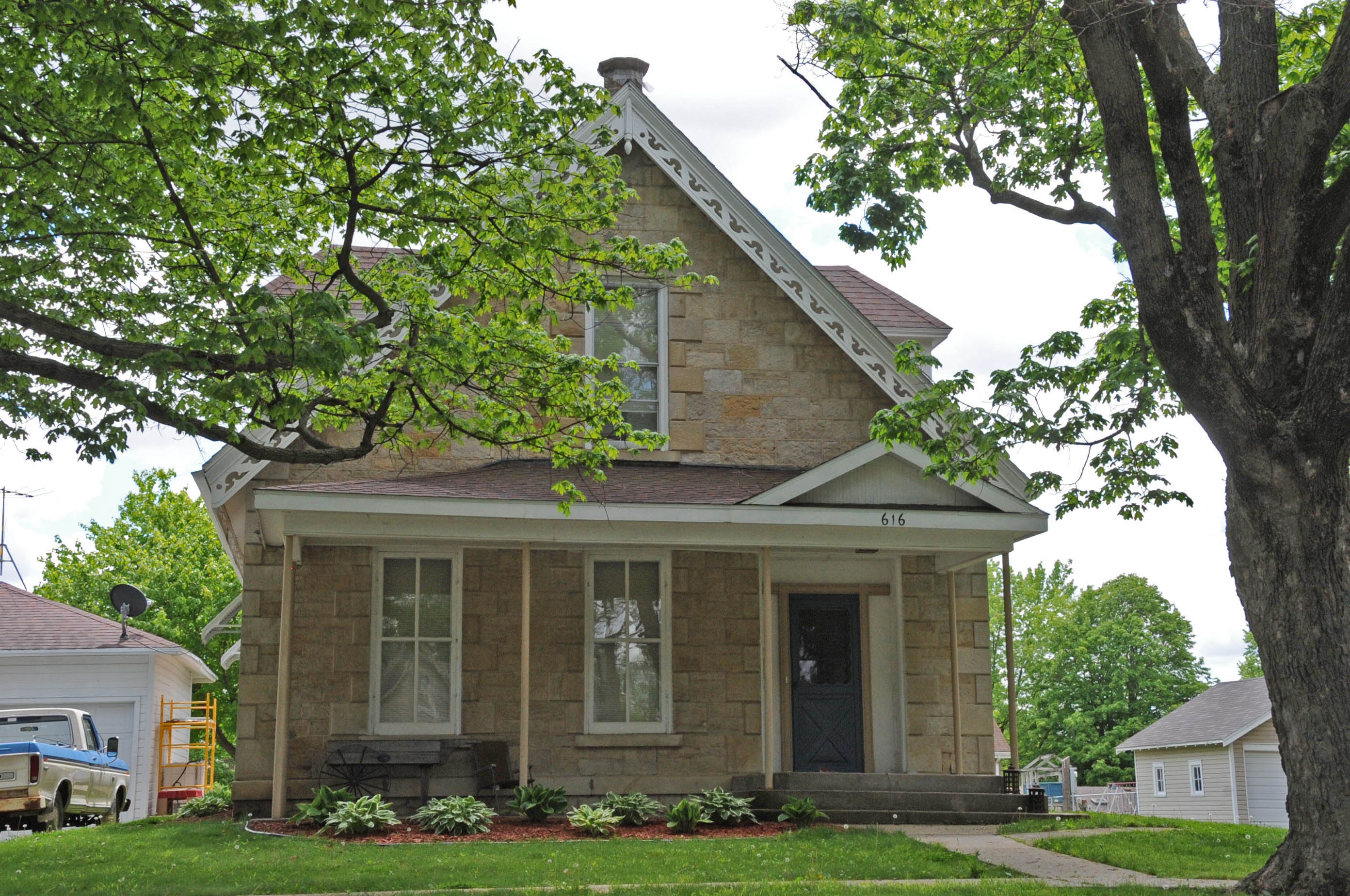

- Location within Iowa Location within the United States
- Location: 616 E. Court Ave. Winterset, Iowa
- Coordinates: 41°20′03″N 94°00′25″W
- Area: less than one acre
- Built: 1865
- Built by: David Harris
- MPS: Legacy in Stone: The Settlement Era of Madison County, Iowa TR
- NRHP reference No.: 87001689
- Added to NRHP: March 18, 1993

The William R. and Martha Foster Shriver House is a historic residence located in Winterset, Iowa, United States. William R. Shriver was an Ohio native who settled in Jefferson County, Iowa before he moved to Madison County in 1853–54. He married Martha Foster in 1858 in Winterset. He was a wagon-maker by trade, and served as a lieutenant in the 1st Iowa Cavalry during the American Civil War. Shriver went into farming in the 1870s, and they left this house at that time. He went on to serve as the Clerk of District Court from 1882 to 1887. The Shrivers left Iowa for California in 1890 because of Martha's health. She died there that same year, and William returned to Iowa permanently in 1900.

The 1½-story structure is composed of locally quarried limestone. It features chamfered rustication, two octagon-shaped stone chimneys, cut out bargeboards with a pendant post at the gable peak, and a full-length Greek Revival-style front porch (a later addition). The rear frame addition and porch was built in either the late 19th century, or the early 20th century. The roof dormers are early 20th century additions. The house was listed on the National Register of Historic Places in 1993.
