= John and Amanda Bigler Drake House =

Historic house in Iowa, United States

- U.S. National Register of Historic Places
- Location within Iowa Location within the United States
- Location: 11 miles west of Winterset on Iowa Highway 92
- Coordinates: 41°18′57″N 94°13′22″W
- Area: less than one acre
- Built: 1856
- Built by: David Harris
- MPS: Legacy in Stone: The Settlement Era of Madison County, Iowa TR
- NRHP reference No.: 87001670
- Added to NRHP: September 29, 1987

The John and Amanda Bigler Drake House is a historic residence located west of Winterset, Iowa, United States. The Drake's settled in Madison County in 1853. Within five years he had acquired 560 acres (230 ha) of land. This house was built around 1856. It is an early example of a vernacular limestone farmhouse. This two-story structure has a two-story addition composed of locally quarried ashlar and rubble stone. It features a lintel course, a protruding water table, the main entryway has an elaborate transom and sidelights, and stone chimneys on both gable ends. The house was listed on the National Register of Historic Places in 1987. When the house was nominated for the National Register it was still owned by the Drake family.
