= James Allen Stone Barn =

- U.S. National Register of Historic Places
- Location within Iowa Location within the United States
- Location: 2½ miles southeast of Earlham
- Coordinates: 41°26′56″N 94°06′20″W
- Area: less than one acre
- Built: 1856
- MPS: Legacy in Stone: The Settlement Era of Madison County, Iowa TR
- NRHP reference No.: 87001658
- Added to NRHP: September 29, 1987

The James Allen Stone Barn is a historic building located on a farm southeast of Earlham, Iowa, United States. Allen acquired 280 acres (110 ha) in 1855, and is thought to have built this barn to house his draft stallions. The single-story, one-room structure is composed of locally quarried rubble stone. The entrance on the east side and a window on the west side both have arched openings. The interior had four stalls for the horses. Frame lean-tos were added to the north and south elevations at a later date. The barn was listed on the National Register of Historic Places in 1987.
