= Duff Barn =

- U.S. National Register of Historic Places
- Location within Iowa Location within the United States
- Location: 1½ miles north of Winterset on U.S. Route 169
- Coordinates: 41°22′03″N 94°00′53″W
- Area: less than one acre
- Built: 1870
- Built by: David Harris
- MPS: Legacy in Stone: The Settlement Era of Madison County, Iowa TR
- NRHP reference No.: 87001672
- Added to NRHP: March 18, 1993

The Duff Barn is a historic building located on a farm north of Winterset, Iowa, United States. Silas Barnes bought 160 acres (65 ha) in 1847, and received the deed in 1850. Robert Duff bought 80 acres (32 ha) from him, and Samuel and Jeannie Duff bought that same parcel in 1870. Robert died in 1873 and Samuel in 1876. This barn was built by one of them, but it is unknown by which one. It was built with locally quarried limestone. It is attributed to David Harris because the following elements of his work are found here: a rectangle plan that is asymmetrically massed, two-against-one broken bond, and textured surfaces on the quoins, jambs and lintels. The barn was listed together on the National Register of Historic Places in 1993.
