= Emily Hornback House =

Historic house in Iowa, United States

- U.S. National Register of Historic Places
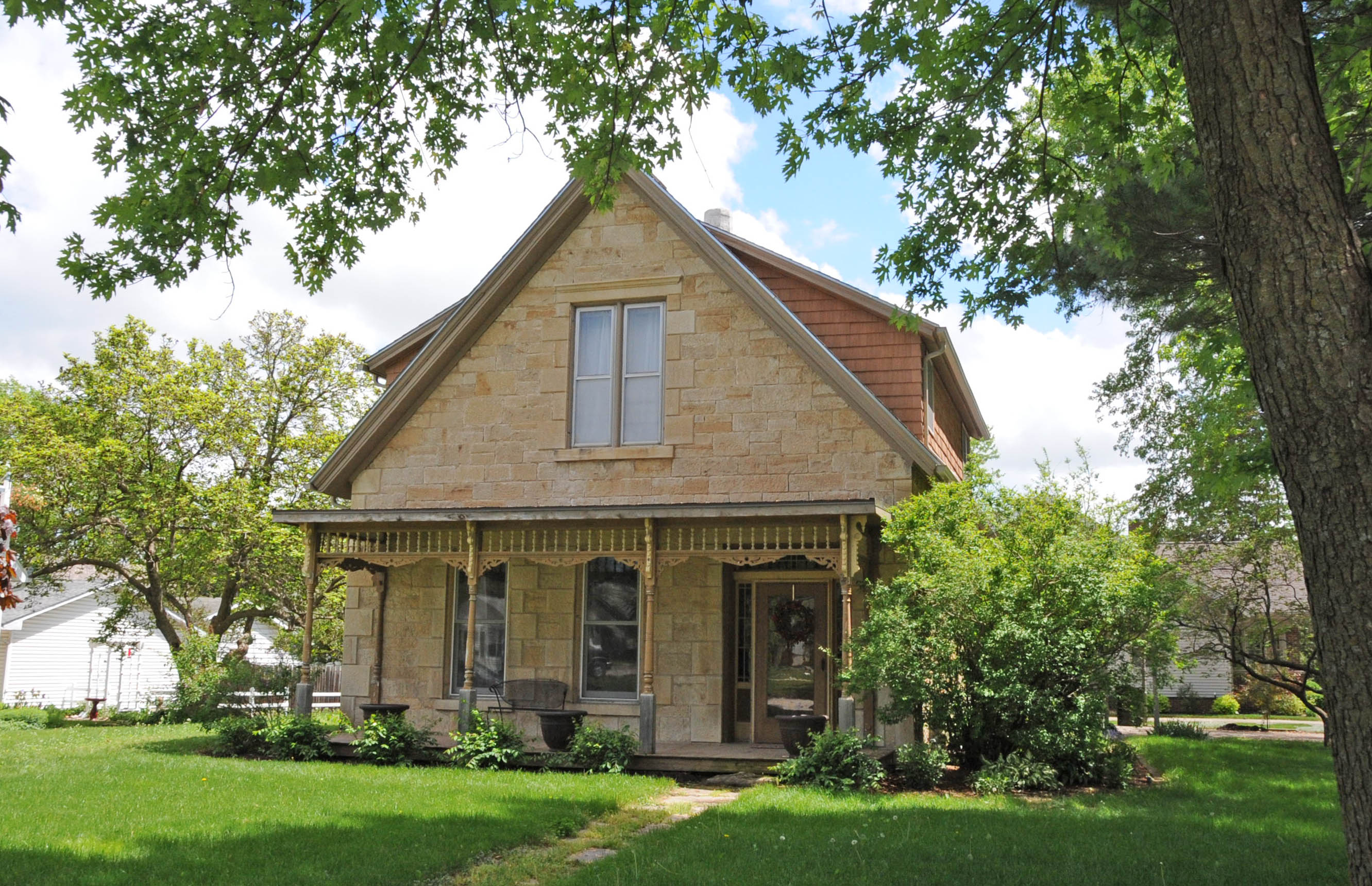

- Location within Iowa Location within the United States
- Location: 605 N. 1st St. Winterset, Iowa
- Coordinates: 41°20′22″N 94°00′46″W
- Area: less than one acre
- Built: 1856
- Built by: David Harris
- MPS: Legacy in Stone: The Settlement Era of Madison County, Iowa TR
- NRHP reference No.: 87001687
- Added to NRHP: September 29, 1987

The Emily Hornback House is a historic residence located in Winterset, Iowa, United States. The Hornbacks were a prominent family in town. Brothers George and James were in business with their father building wagons. Emily was married to one of the brothers, although it is unclear which one. She bought this property on contract beginning in 1856 and acquired the title outright in 1860. The house was built about the time she started to acquire the property. She lost the property to land agents Pitzer and Knight in 1865. The 1½-story limestone structure is composed of ashlar and rubble. It features chamfered rustication, an octagon-shaped stone chimney, and a full-length front porch with four ornately turned posts and spindles around the top. It was listed on the National Register of Historic Places in 1987.
