= McDonald House (Winterset, Iowa) =

Historic house in Iowa, United States

- U.S. National Register of Historic Places
- Location within Iowa Location within the United States
- Location: 3½ miles west of Winterset off Iowa Highway 92
- Coordinates: 41°21′32″N 94°05′31″W
- Area: less than one acre
- Built: 1875
- Built by: David Harris
- MPS: Legacy in Stone: The Settlement Era of Madison County, Iowa TR
- NRHP reference No.: 87001676
- Added to NRHP: March 18, 1993

The McDonald House is a historic residence located west of Winterset, Iowa, United States. William and Barbara McDonald settled in Madison County during the Civil War, and bought this farm in the 1870s. Although not as early as others in the county, this house is a good example of a vernacular limestone farmhouse. This 1½-story structure is composed of locally quarried stone. Its construction is attributed to David Harris, who was one of the last stonemasons still working in the county when this was built. It follows an asymmetrical massed rectangular plan, and it is built on a slightly raised basement. It features two-against-one broken bond, and textured stone characteristic of Harris' work. The house was listed on the National Register of Historic Places in 1993.
