= Madison Township, Madison County, Iowa =

Township in Madison County, Iowa, U.S.

Coordinates: 41.46°N 94.07°W

Madison Township is a township in Madison County, Iowa, in the United States.

== History ==
Madison Township was established in 1851.
