= St. Charles, Iowa =

- City
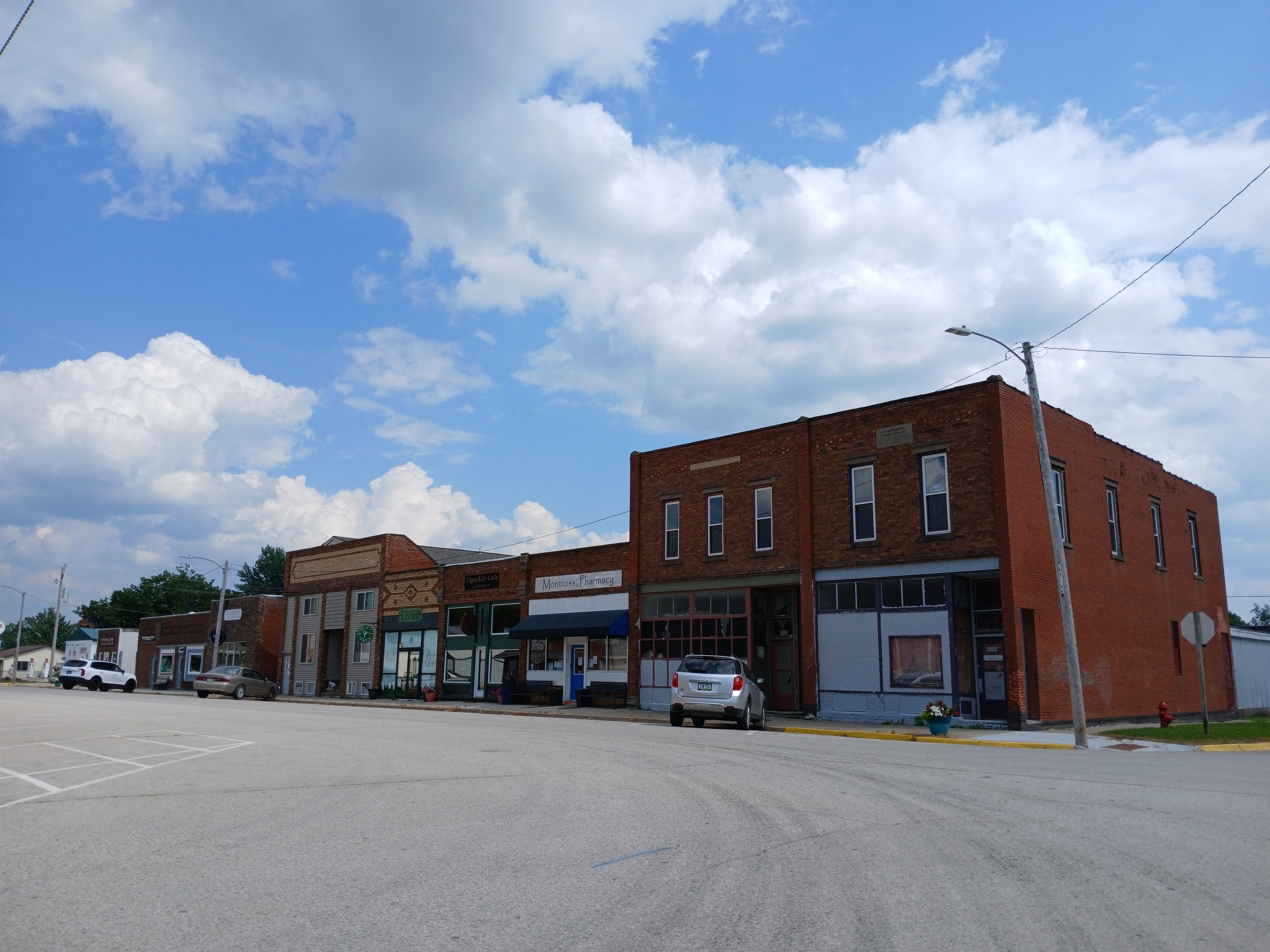

- Location of St. Charles, Iowa
- Coordinates: 41°17′14″N 93°48′27″W
- Country: USA
- State: Iowa
- County: Madison

Area
  - Total: 0.62 sq mi (1.61 km^{2})
  - Land: 0.62 sq mi (1.61 km^{2})
  - Water: 0 sq mi (0.00 km^{2})
- Elevation: 1,060 ft (320 m)

Population (2020)
  - Total: 640
  - Density: 1,030.2/sq mi (397.77/km^{2})
- Time zone: UTC-6 (Central (CST))
  - Summer (DST): UTC-5 (CDT)
- ZIP code: 50240
- Area code: 641
- FIPS code: 19-69915
- GNIS feature ID: 2396478
- Website: stcharlesia.us

St. Charles or Saint Charles is a city in Madison County, Iowa, United States. The population was 640 at the time of the 2020 census. It is part of the Des Moines–West Des Moines Metropolitan Statistical Area.

== History ==
St. Charles was platted in 1852. It was named after the city of St. Charles, Missouri. St. Charles was incorporated as a city in 1876.

From 2015, the city annually hosts the Hinterland Music Festival, which is considered to be the largest music festival in Iowa. In 2018, the city also became the site of the Big Country Bash, a country music festival which had previously been hosted in Des Moines.

== Geography ==
According to the United States Census Bureau, the city has a total area of 0.54 square miles (1.40 km^{2}), all of it land.

== Demographics ==
Historical populations
Year	Pop.	±%
1880	183	—
1890	387	+111.5%
1900	412	+6.5%
1910	399	−3.2%
1920	430	+7.8%
1930	400	−7.0%
1940	331	−17.2%
1950	319	−3.6%
1960	355	+11.3%
1970	443	+24.8%
1980	507	+14.4%
1990	537	+5.9%
2000	619	+15.3%
2010	653	+5.5%
2020	640	−2.0%
Source:"U.S. Census website". United States Census Bureau. and Iowa Data Center; Source: U.S. Decennial Census

=== 2020 census ===
As of the census of 2020, there were 640 people, 259 households, and 179 families residing in the city. The population density was 1,030.2 inhabitants per square mile (397.8/km^{2}). There were 274 housing units at an average density of 441.1 per square mile (170.3/km^{2}). The racial makeup of the city was 92.7% White, 0.6% Black or African American, 0.0% Native American, 0.0% Asian, 0.0% Pacific Islander, 0.9% from other races and 5.8% from two or more races. Hispanic or Latino persons of any race comprised 1.4% of the population.

Of the 259 households, 30.1% of which had children under the age of 18 living with them, 58.7% were married couples living together, 5.4% were cohabitating couples, 20.8% had a female householder with no spouse or partner present and 15.1% had a male householder with no spouse or partner present. 30.9% of all households were non-families. 25.1% of all households were made up of individuals, 12.4% had someone living alone who was 65 years old or older.

The median age in the city was 39.0 years. 26.6% of the residents were under the age of 20; 5.5% were between the ages of 20 and 24; 25.5% were from 25 and 44; 23.6% were from 45 and 64; and 18.9% were 65 years of age or older. The gender makeup of the city was 50.3% male and 49.7% female.

=== 2010 U.S. Census ===
As of the 2010 United States census, there were 653 people, 258 households, and 184 families living in the city. The population density was 1,209.3 inhabitants per square mile (466.9/km^{2}). There were 270 housing units at an average density of 500.0 per square mile (193.1/km^{2}). The racial makeup of the city was 97.1% white, 1.7% African American and 1.2% from two or more races. Hispanic or Latino of any race were 1.5% of the population.

There were 258 households, of which 38.8% had children under the age of 18 living with them, 54.7% were married couples living together, 12.8% had a female householder with no husband present, 3.9% had a male householder with no wife present, and 28.7% were non-families. 23.3% of all households were made up of individuals, and 10.5% had someone living alone who was 65 years of age or older. The average household size was 2.53 and the average family size was 2.98.

The median age in the city was 35.9 years. 28.9% of residents were under the age of 18; 5.9% were between the ages of 18 and 24; 26.8% were from 25 to 44; 25.4% were from 45 to 64; and 13% were 65 years of age or older. The gender makeup of the city was 49.3% male and 50.7% female.

=== 2000 U.S. Census ===
As of the 2000 United States census, there were 619 people, 246 households, and 171 families living in the city. The population density was 1,101.6 inhabitants per square mile (425.3/km^{2}). There were 253 housing units at an average density of 450.3 per square mile (173.9/km^{2}). The racial makeup of the city was 99.52% white, 0.16% from other races and 0.32% from two or more races. Hispanic or Latino of any race were 0.81% of the population.

There were 246 households, out of which 37.0% had children under the age of 18 living with them, 60.2% were married couples living together, 8.1% had a female householder with no husband present, and 30.1% were non-families. 26.4% of all households were made up of individuals, and 11.8% had someone living alone who was 65 years of age or older. The average household size was 2.52 and the average family size was 3.08.

In the city, the population was spread out, with 28.6% under the age of 18, 6.6% from 18 to 24, 32.3% from 25 to 44, 20.7% from 45 to 64, and 11.8% who were 65 years of age or older. The median age was 34 years. For every 100 females, there were 105.6 males. For every 100 females age 18 and over, there were 91.3 males.

The median income for a household in the city was $42,333, and the median income for a family was $45,000. Males had a median income of $31,667 versus $24,792 for females. The per capita income for the city was $18,708. About 3.6% of families and 4.0% of the population were below the poverty line, including 6.3% of those under age 18 and 2.9% of those age 65 or over.

== Education ==
Interstate 35 Community School District serves the municipality.

== Notable people ==
- Kim Reynolds, 43rd governor of Iowa
