= Earlham, Iowa =

- City
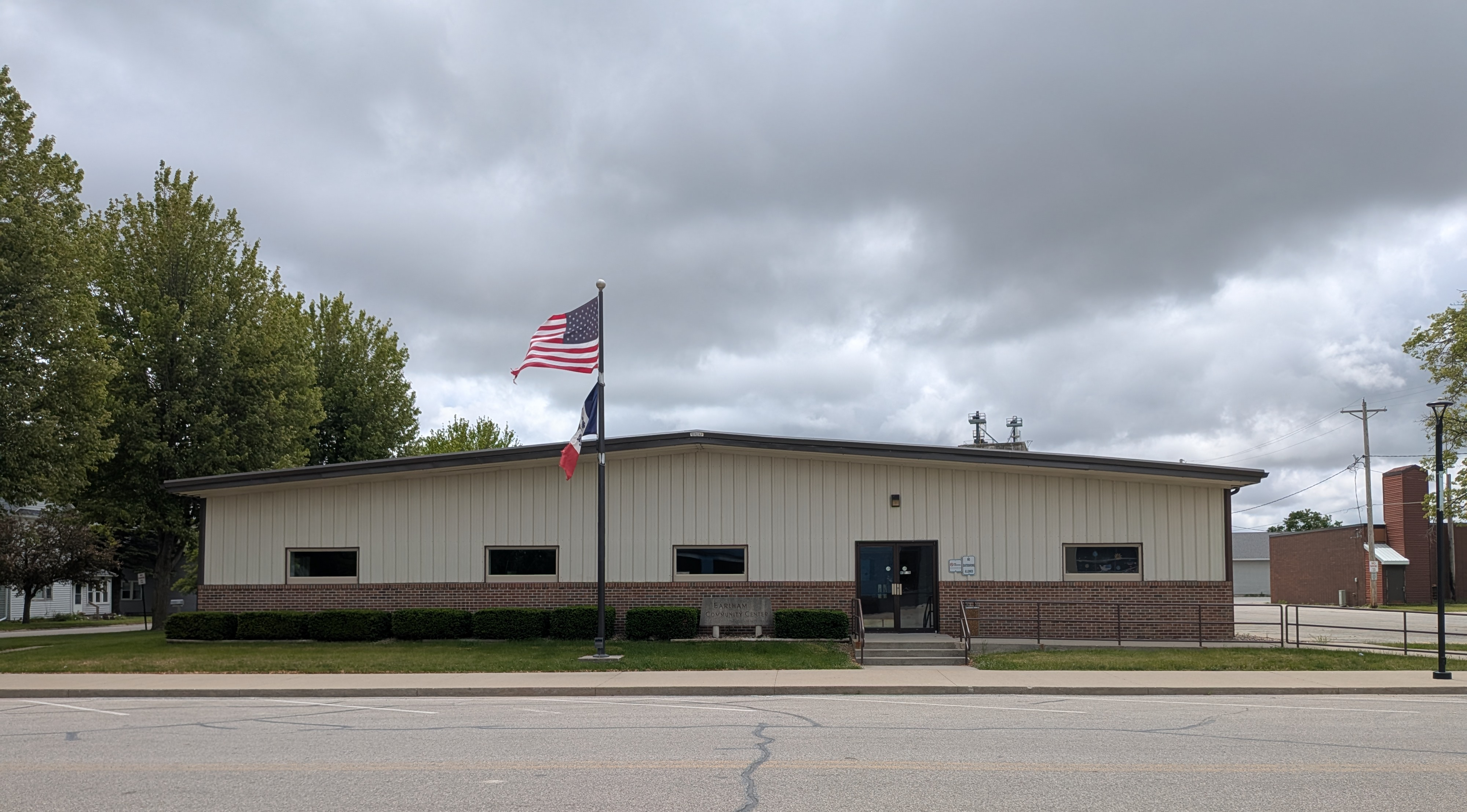
- Community Center
- Motto: "Plant roots. See them grow."
- Location of Earlham, Iowa
- Coordinates: 41°29′48″N 94°07′32″W
- Country: USA
- State: Iowa
- County: Madison

Area
  - Total: 0.95 sq mi (2.45 km^{2})
  - Land: 0.95 sq mi (2.45 km^{2})
  - Water: 0 sq mi (0.00 km^{2})
- Elevation: 1,099 ft (335 m)

Population (2020)
  - Total: 1,410
  - Density: 1,492.8/sq mi (576.37/km^{2})
- Time zone: UTC-6 (Central (CST))
  - Summer (DST): UTC-5 (CDT)
- ZIP code: 50072
- Area code: 515
- FIPS code: 19-23340
- GNIS feature ID: 2394590
- Website: earlhamiowa.org

Earlham (Note: /ˈɜːrləm/) is a city in Madison County, Iowa, United States. The population was 1,410 at the time of the 2020 census. It is part of the Des Moines–West Des Moines Metropolitan Statistical Area.

== History ==
David Hockett brought his wife, Mary Jane, and three children to the Earlham area by ox team and wagon in 1865. They settled on 200 acres where Earlham stands today. By deeding a land string to the Chicago, Rock Island and Pacific Railroad and selling a third of his acres for town development in 1869, Hockett was instrumental in the founding of Earlham, when it was incorporated on April 26, 1870. The city was named after Earlham College, a Quaker college in Richmond, Indiana.

== Geography ==
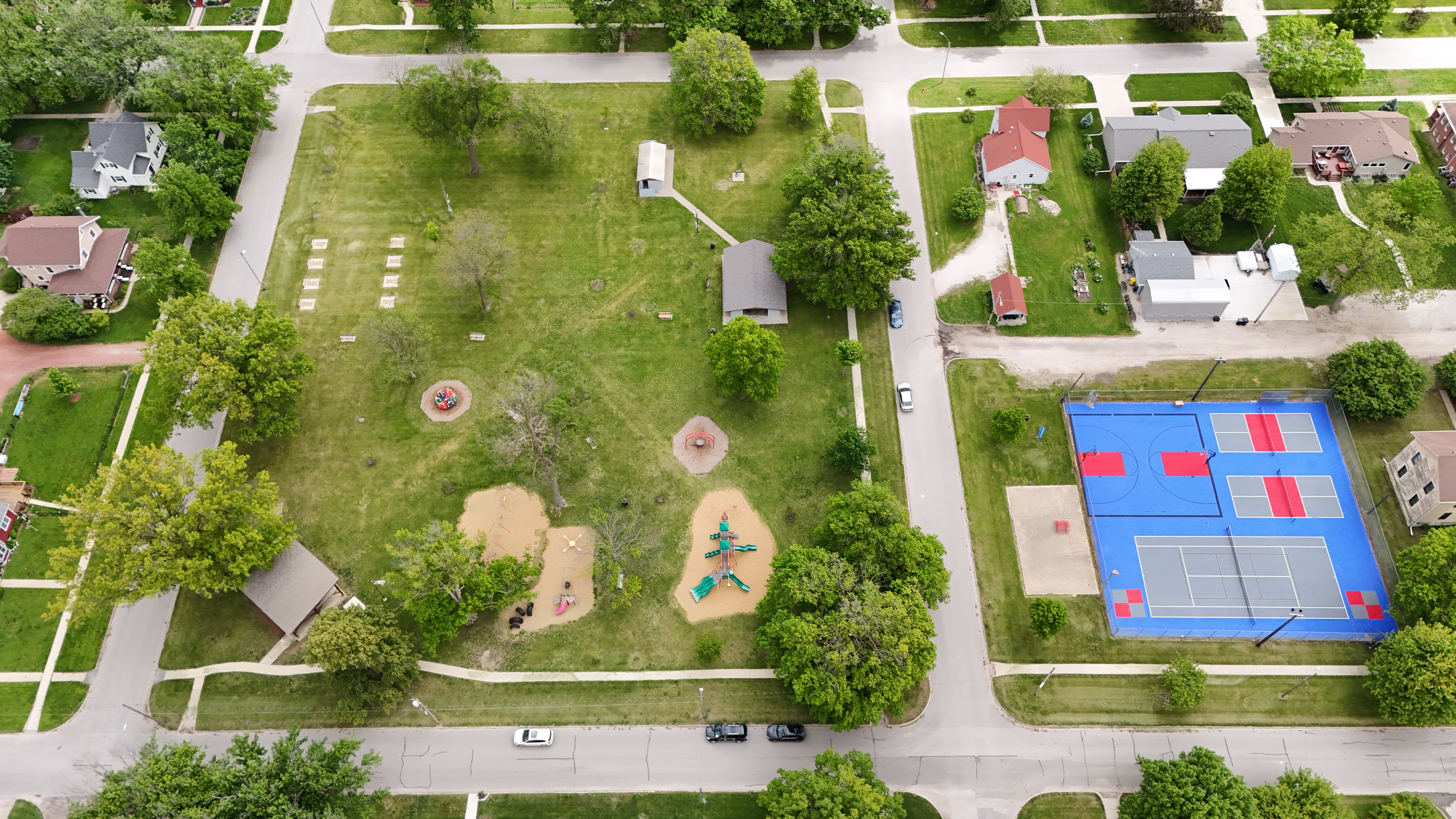
Earlham city park

According to the United States Census Bureau, the city has a total area of 0.97 square miles (2.51 km^{2}), all of it land.

== Demographics ==
Historical populations
Year	Pop.	±%
1870	222	—
1880	260	+17.1%
1890	302	+16.2%
1900	630	+108.6%
1910	749	+18.9%
1920	803	+7.2%
1930	897	+11.7%
1940	865	−3.6%
1950	771	−10.9%
1960	788	+2.2%
1970	974	+23.6%
1980	1,140	+17.0%
1990	1,157	+1.5%
2000	1,298	+12.2%
2010	1,450	+11.7%
2020	1,410	−2.8%
Source:"U.S. Census website". United States Census Bureau. and Iowa Data Center; Source: U.S. Decennial Census

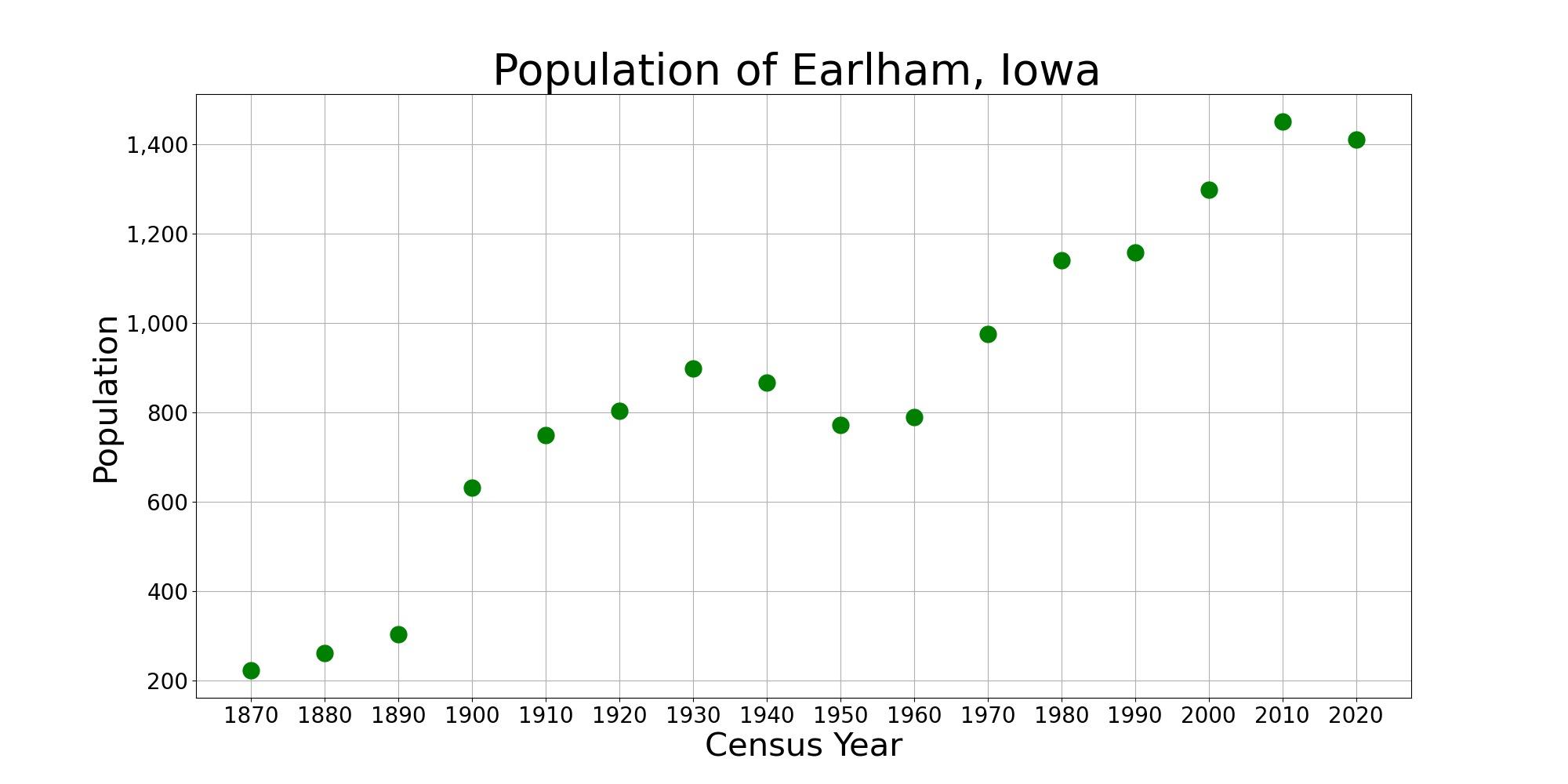
The population of Earlham, Iowa from US census data

=== 2020 census ===
As of the 2020 census, there were 1,410 people, 548 households, and 384 families residing in the city.

The population density was 1,492.8 inhabitants per square mile (576.4/km^{2}). There were 572 housing units at an average density of 605.6 per square mile (233.8/km^{2}). Of all housing units, 4.2% were vacant; the homeowner vacancy rate was 0.0% and the rental vacancy rate was 2.6%.

Of the 548 households, 36.7% had children under the age of 18 living with them, 54.7% were married-couple households, 5.3% were cohabitating couple households, 14.2% had a male householder with no spouse or partner present, and 25.7% had a female householder with no spouse or partner present. About 29.9% of households were non-families, 26.3% were made up of individuals, and 14.3% had someone living alone who was 65 years of age or older.

The median age was 39.5 years. 27.9% of residents were under the age of 18. 31.3% of residents were under the age of 20; 4.5% were from 20 to 24; 22.5% were from 25 to 44; 26.0% were from 45 to 64; and 15.8% were 65 years of age or older. The gender makeup of the city was 50.4% male and 49.6% female. For every 100 females, there were 101.7 males; for every 100 females age 18 and over, there were 92.4 males age 18 and over.

0.0% of residents lived in urban areas, while 100.0% lived in rural areas.

Racial composition as of the 2020 census
Race	Number	Percent
White	1,338	94.9%
Black or African American	12	0.9%
American Indian and Alaska Native	3	0.2%
Asian	0	0.0%
Native Hawaiian and Other Pacific Islander	0	0.0%
Some other race	14	1.0%
Two or more races	43	3.0%
Hispanic or Latino (of any race)	26	1.8%

=== 2010 census ===
As of the census of 2010, there were 1,450 people, 544 households, and 389 families living in the city. The population density was 1,494.8 inhabitants per square mile (577.1/km^{2}). There were 571 housing units at an average density of 588.7 per square mile (227.3/km^{2}). The racial makeup of the city was 98.3% White, 0.1% African American, 0.5% Asian, 0.2% from other races, and 0.9% from two or more races. Hispanic or Latino of any race were 0.8% of the population.

There were 544 households, of which 41.9% had children under the age of 18 living with them, 59.2% were married couples living together, 8.5% had a female householder with no husband present, 3.9% had a male householder with no wife present, and 28.5% were non-families. 24.8% of all households were made up of individuals, and 10.5% had someone living alone who was 65 years of age or older. The average household size was 2.67 and the average family size was 3.22.

The median age in the city was 34.3 years. 31.6% of residents were under the age of 18; 6.2% were between the ages of 18 and 24; 30.3% were from 25 to 44; 20.8% were from 45 to 64; and 11.2% were 65 years of age or older. The gender makeup of the city was 50.0% male and 50.0% female.

=== 2000 census ===
As of the census of 2000, there were 1,298 people, 491 households, and 352 families living in the city. The population density was 1,336.9 inhabitants per square mile (516.2/km^{2}). There were 520 housing units at an average density of 535.6 per square mile (206.8/km^{2}). The racial makeup of the city was 99.31% White, 0.15% African American, 0.08% Native American, and 0.46% from two or more races. Hispanic or Latino of any race were 0.62% of the population.

There were 491 households, out of which 39.1% had children under the age of 18 living with them, 61.9% were married couples living together, 7.7% had a female householder with no husband present, and 28.3% were non-families. 24.8% of all households were made up of individuals, and 13.8% had someone living alone who was 65 years of age or older. The average household size was 2.59 and the average family size was 3.11.

Age spread: 29.5% under the age of 18, 7.1% from 18 to 24, 32.7% from 25 to 44, 17.4% from 45 to 64, and 13.3% who were 65 years of age or older. The median age was 33 years. For every 100 females, there were 95.5 males. For every 100 females age 18 and over, there were 91.4 males.

The median income for a household in the city was $42,917, and the median income for a family was $54,519. Males had a median income of $32,262 versus $24,896 for females. The per capita income for the city was $20,659. About 0.9% of families and 3.8% of the population were below the poverty line, including 1.8% of those under age 18 and 5.4% of those age 65 or over.

== Education ==
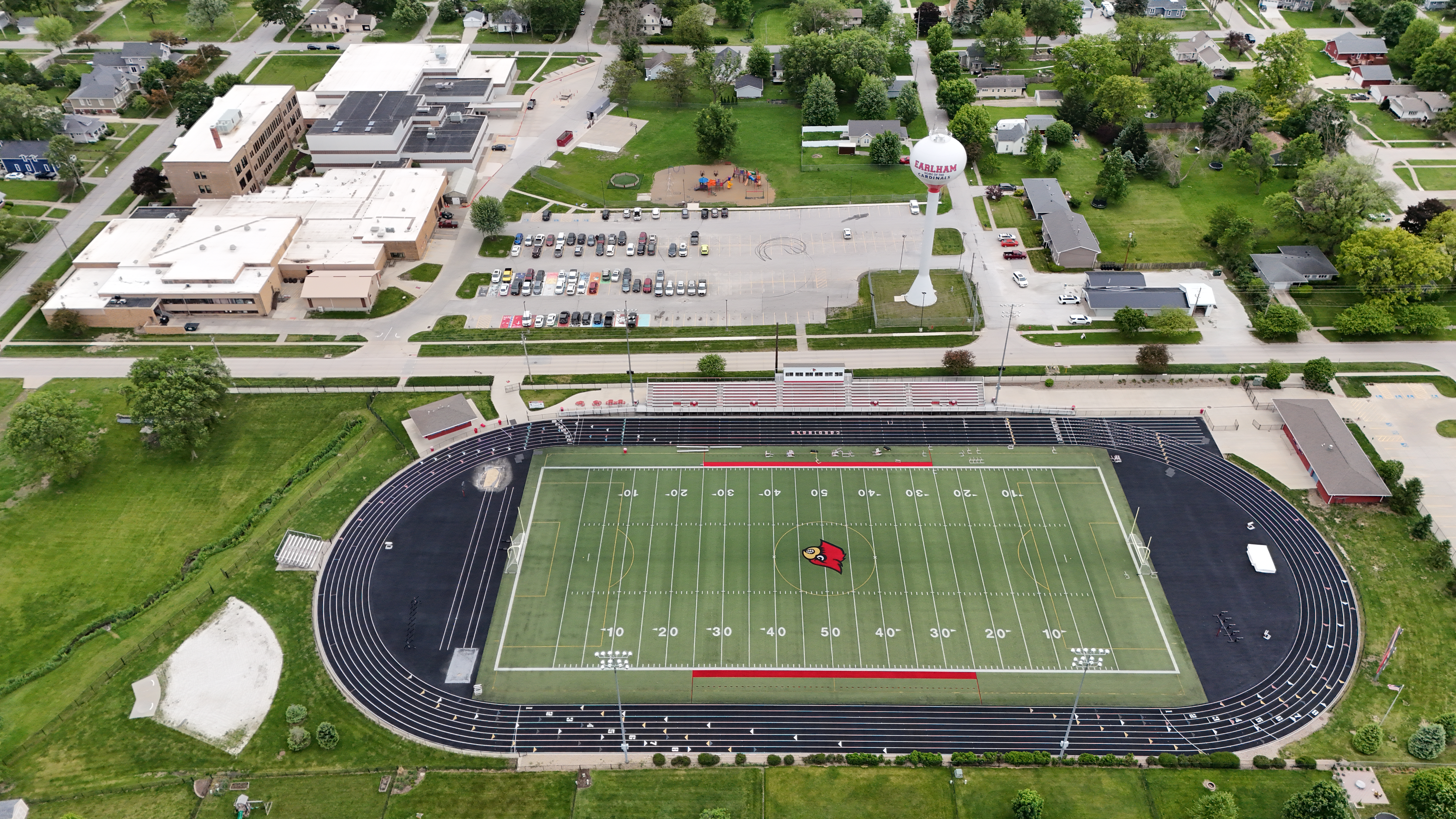
Earlham High School (upper left) and its football field

Earlham is served by the Earlham Community School District.
