= Winterset, Iowa =

- City
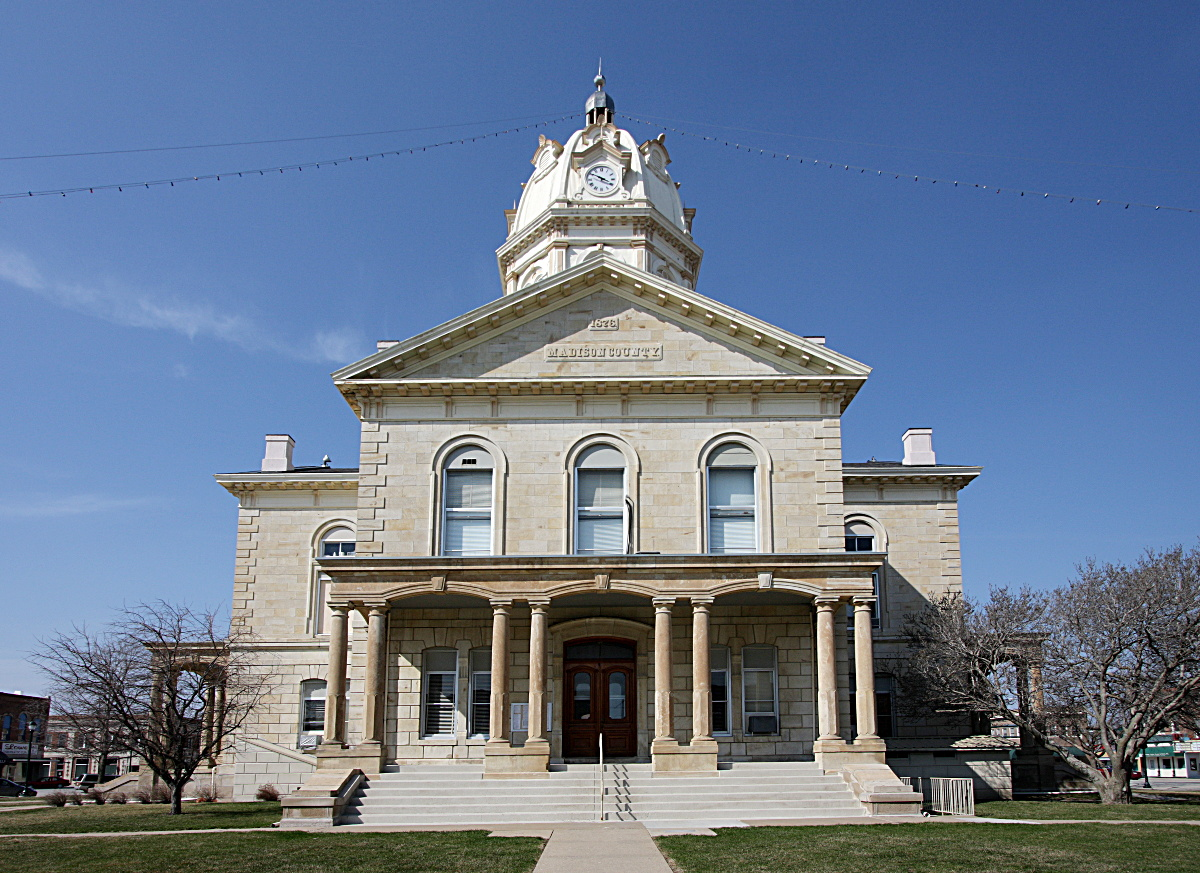
- Madison County Courthouse in Winterset

- Location of Winterset, Iowa
- Coordinates: 41°22′12″N 94°00′05″W
- Country: United States
- State: Iowa
- County: Madison

Area
  - Total: 4.73 sq mi (12.24 km^{2})
  - Land: 4.59 sq mi (11.88 km^{2})
  - Water: 0.14 sq mi (0.36 km^{2})
- Elevation: 1,099 ft (335 m)

Population (2020)
  - Total: 5,353
  - Density: 1,166.9/sq mi (450.53/km^{2})
- Time zone: UTC−6 (Central (CST))
  - Summer (DST): UTC−5 (CDT)
- ZIP Code: 50273
- Area code: 515
- FIPS code: 19-86520
- GNIS feature ID: 469011
- Website: winterset.gov

Winterset is a city in the county seat of Madison County, Iowa, United States. The population was 5,353 at the time of the 2020 census. Located in rolling farmland 35 miles south of Des Moines, Winterset is part of the Des Moines metropolitan area. It is known most notably for being the birthplace of actor John Wayne.

== History ==
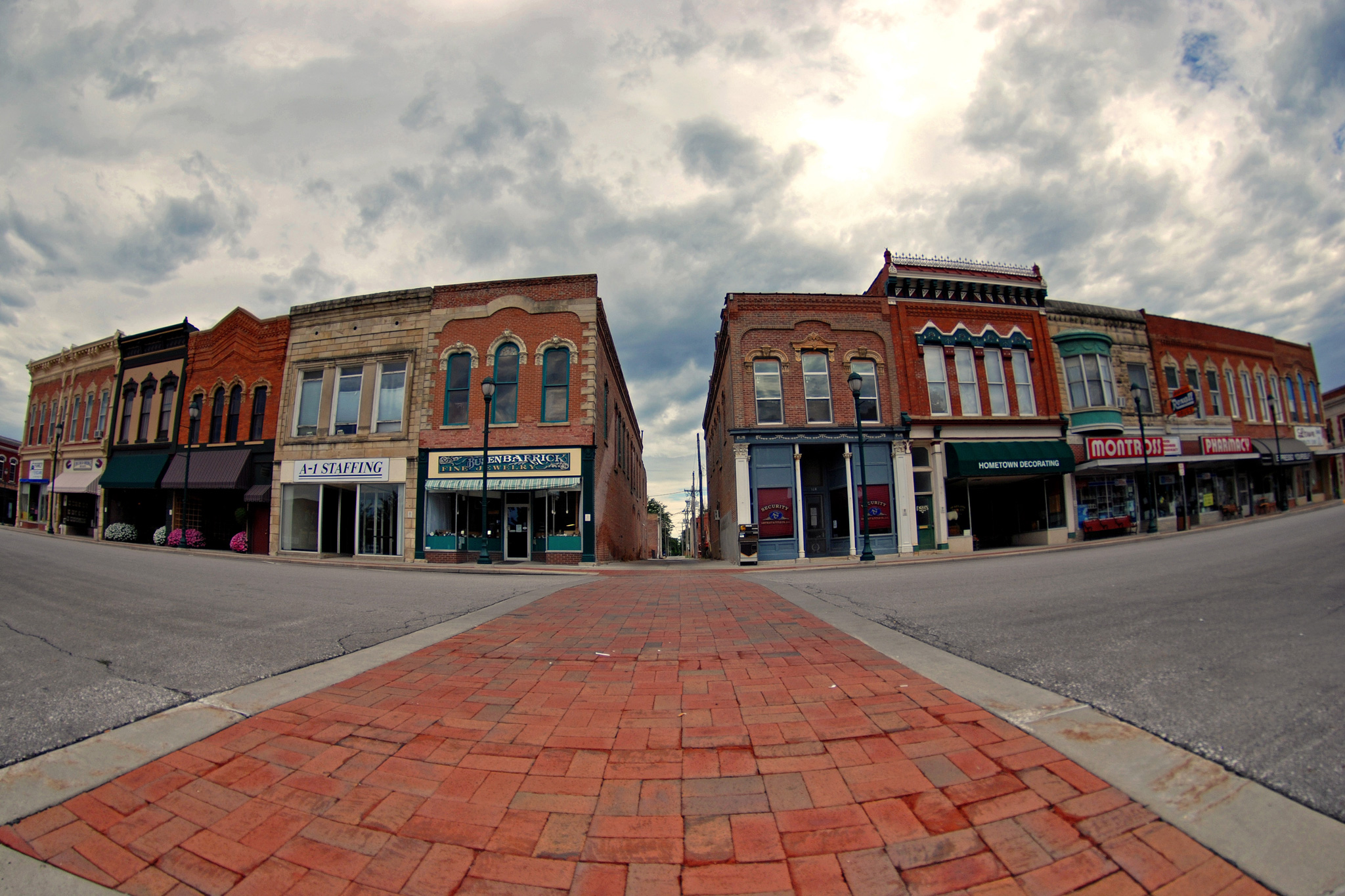
Downtown Winterset in 2009

Winterset was platted during a cool spell in the summer of 1849. The name was originally to be "Summerset", but the unseasonable coldness made the commissioners reverse this to "Winterset".

On March 5, 2022, a low-end EF4 tornado struck the areas just outside the city, killing six people.

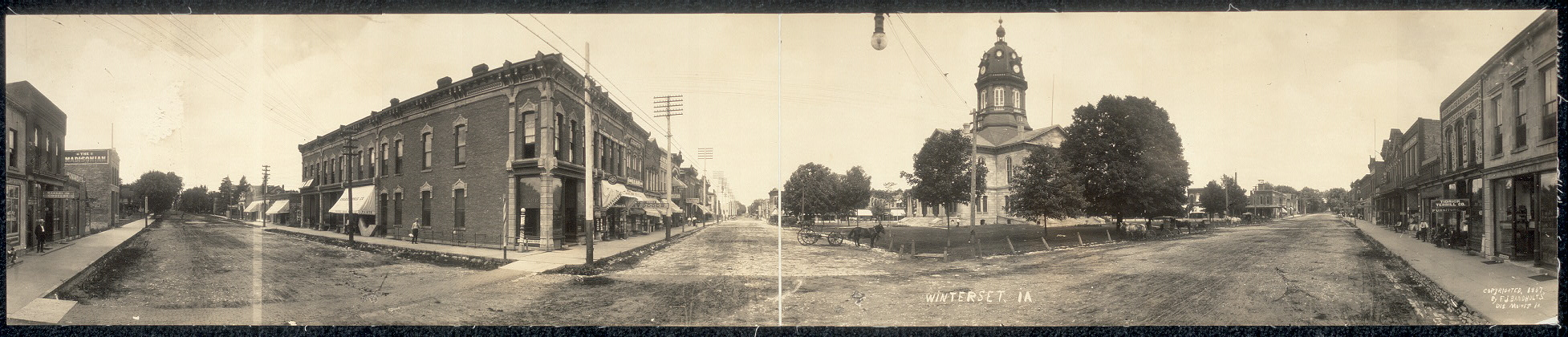
Downtown Winterset in 1907

== Geography ==
Winterset is located in central Madison County at the intersection of U.S. Route 169 and Iowa State Highway 92. Middle River flows past the south side of the city. It is approximately 30 miles southwest of the state capital of Des Moines.

According to the United States Census Bureau, the city has a total area of 4.72 square miles (12.22 km^{2}), of which, 4.58 square miles (11.86 km^{2}) is land and 0.14 square miles (0.36 km^{2}) is water.

=== Climate ===
According to the Köppen Climate Classification system, Winterset has a hot-summer humid continental climate, abbreviated "Dfa" on climate maps.

Climate data for Winterset, Iowa, 1991–2020 normals, extremes 1893–2017
Month	Jan	Feb	Mar	Apr	May	Jun	Jul	Aug	Sep	Oct	Nov	Dec	Year
Record high °F (°C)	67 (19)	79 (26)	90 (32)	93 (34)	105 (41)	105 (41)	111 (44)	112 (44)	103 (39)	93 (34)	82 (28)	69 (21)	112 (44)
Mean maximum °F (°C)	54.2 (12.3)	58.9 (14.9)	75.3 (24.1)	83.2 (28.4)	86.3 (30.2)	91.2 (32.9)	94.8 (34.9)	94.1 (34.5)	89.4 (31.9)	82.2 (27.9)	68.8 (20.4)	56.5 (13.6)	96.4 (35.8)
Mean daily maximum °F (°C)	29.9 (−1.2)	34.8 (1.6)	47.6 (8.7)	60.5 (15.8)	70.8 (21.6)	80.0 (26.7)	83.8 (28.8)	82.3 (27.9)	75.6 (24.2)	63.3 (17.4)	48.1 (8.9)	35.1 (1.7)	59.3 (15.2)
Daily mean °F (°C)	19.9 (−6.7)	24.0 (−4.4)	36.2 (2.3)	48.0 (8.9)	59.4 (15.2)	69.2 (20.7)	73.0 (22.8)	70.9 (21.6)	63.1 (17.3)	50.8 (10.4)	37.1 (2.8)	25.5 (−3.6)	48.1 (8.9)
Mean daily minimum °F (°C)	9.8 (−12.3)	13.2 (−10.4)	24.8 (−4.0)	35.4 (1.9)	48.0 (8.9)	58.3 (14.6)	62.2 (16.8)	59.4 (15.2)	50.6 (10.3)	38.3 (3.5)	26.0 (−3.3)	15.9 (−8.9)	36.8 (2.7)
Mean minimum °F (°C)	−10.3 (−23.5)	−6.9 (−21.6)	6.3 (−14.3)	21.5 (−5.8)	34.9 (1.6)	45.8 (7.7)	52.0 (11.1)	49.1 (9.5)	34.6 (1.4)	22.7 (−5.2)	10.2 (−12.1)	−5.9 (−21.1)	−14.5 (−25.8)
Record low °F (°C)	−34 (−37)	−31 (−35)	−35 (−37)	10 (−12)	24 (−4)	34 (1)	40 (4)	37 (3)	24 (−4)	3 (−16)	−8 (−22)	−25 (−32)	−35 (−37)
Average precipitation inches (mm)	0.78 (20)	1.28 (33)	2.12 (54)	3.59 (91)	4.99 (127)	4.64 (118)	4.10 (104)	3.62 (92)	3.60 (91)	2.88 (73)	1.96 (50)	1.23 (31)	34.79 (884)
Average snowfall inches (cm)	7.3 (19)	8.3 (21)	4.7 (12)	0.8 (2.0)	0.1 (0.25)	0.0 (0.0)	0.0 (0.0)	0.0 (0.0)	0.0 (0.0)	0.9 (2.3)	2.7 (6.9)	5.9 (15)	30.7 (78.45)
Average precipitation days (≥ 0.01 in)	5.2	5.6	7.3	10.3	11.9	10.2	9.5	8.8	7.4	7.7	5.9	6.2	96
Average snowy days (≥ 0.1 in)	3.6	4.0	1.7	0.6	0.0	0.0	0.0	0.0	0.0	0.3	1.2	4.3	15.7
Source 1: NOAA
Source 2: National Weather Service (mean maxima and minima 1981–2010)

== Demographics ==
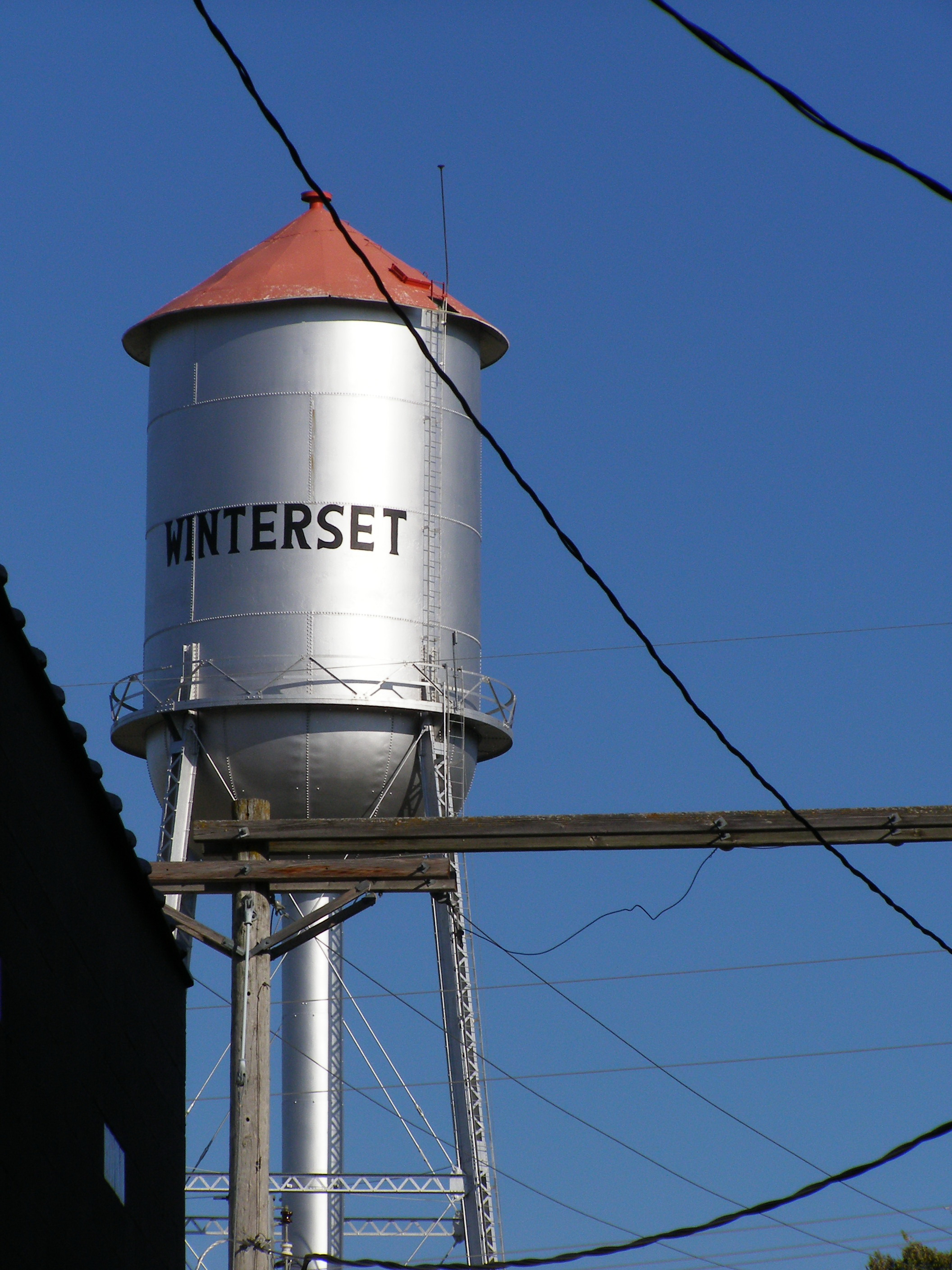
Water tower in Winterset

Historical populations
Year	Pop.	±%
1860	915	—
1870	1,485	+62.3%
1880	2,583	+73.9%
1890	2,281	−11.7%
1900	3,039	+33.2%
1910	2,818	−7.3%
1920	2,906	+3.1%
1930	2,921	+0.5%
1940	3,631	+24.3%
1950	3,570	−1.7%
1960	3,639	+1.9%
1970	3,654	+0.4%
1980	4,021	+10.0%
1990	4,196	+4.4%
2000	4,768	+13.6%
2010	5,190	+8.9%
2020	5,353	+3.1%
Source: U.S. Decennial Census

=== 2020 census ===
As of the 2020 census, there were 5,353 people, 2,231 households, and 1,354 families residing in the city. The population density was 1,166.9 inhabitants per square mile (450.5/km^{2}). There were 2,451 housing units at an average density of 534.3 per square mile (206.3/km^{2}).

The median age in the city was 40.1 years. 26.7% of residents were under the age of 20, including 24.1% under the age of 18, and 20.9% were 65 years of age or older. 5.3% were between the ages of 20 and 24; 24.4% were from 25 to 44; and 22.7% were from 45 to 64. The gender makeup of the city was 47.5% male and 52.5% female. For every 100 females, there were 90.4 males, and for every 100 females age 18 and over, there were 89.0 males age 18 and over.

92.9% of residents lived in urban areas, while 7.1% lived in rural areas.

Among households, 27.8% had children under the age of 18 living with them. Of all households, 47.6% were married-couple households, 7.0% were cohabitating couples, 16.3% were households with a male householder and no spouse or partner present, and 29.1% were households with a female householder and no spouse or partner present. About 39.3% of all households were non-families, 33.6% were made up of individuals, and 17.5% had someone living alone who was 65 years of age or older.

Overall, 9.0% of housing units were vacant. The homeowner vacancy rate was 3.3% and the rental vacancy rate was 7.8%.

Racial composition as of the 2020 census
Race	Number	Percent
White	5,048	94.3%
Black or African American	9	0.2%
American Indian and Alaska Native	5	0.1%
Asian	33	0.6%
Native Hawaiian and Other Pacific Islander	6	0.1%
Some other race	29	0.5%
Two or more races	223	4.2%
Hispanic or Latino (of any race)	147	2.7%

=== 2010 census ===
At the 2010 census there were 5,190 people, 2,062 households, and 1,336 families living in the city. The population density was 1,133.2 inhabitants per square mile (437.5/km^{2}). There were 2,267 housing units at an average density of 495.0 units per square mile (191.1 units/km^{2}). The racial makeup of the city was 98.1% White, 0.2% African American, 0.2% Native American, 0.4% Asian, 0.4% from other races, and 0.7% from two or more races. Hispanic or Latino of any race were 2.0%.

Of the 2,062 households 33.7% had children under the age of 18 living with them, 51.5% were married couples living together, 9.9% had a female householder with no husband present, 3.3% had a male householder with no wife present, and 35.2% were non-families. 31.7% of households were one person and 16% were one person aged 65 or older. The average household size was 2.42 and the average family size was 3.05.

The median age was 38.4 years. 26.8% of residents were under the age of 18; 6.4% were between the ages of 18 and 24; 24.3% were from 25 to 44; 23.9% were from 45 to 64; and 18.6% were 65 or older. The gender makeup of the city was 46.6% male and 53.4% female.

=== 2000 census ===
At the 2000 census there were 4,768 people, 1,884 households, and 1,230 families living in the city. The population density was 1,357.9 inhabitants per square mile (524.3/km^{2}). There were 1,998 housing units at an average density of 569.0 units per square mile (219.7 units/km^{2}). The racial makeup of the city was 98.87% White, 0.06% African American, 0.15% Native American, 0.27% Asian, 0.13% from other races, and 0.52% from two or more races. Hispanic or Latino of any race were 0.59%.

Of the 1,884 households 32.9% had children under the age of 18 living with them, 53.1% were married couples living together, 9.9% had a female householder with no husband present, and 34.7% were non-families. 31.5% of households were one person and 18.1% were one person aged 65 or older. The average household size was 2.39 and the average family size was 3.01.

Age spread: 25.8% under the age of 18, 7.3% from 18 to 24, 25.5% from 25 to 44, 20.3% from 45 to 64, and 21.0% 65 or older. The median age was 39 years. For every 100 females, there were 86.4 males. For every 100 females age 18 and over, there were 78.2 males.

The median household income was $33,142 and the median family income was $42,951. Males had a median income of $31,536 versus $22,146 for females. The per capita income for the city was $17,274. About 5.8% of families and 8.4% of the population were below the poverty line, including 8.9% of those under age 18 and 14.6% of those age 65 or over.

== Arts and culture ==
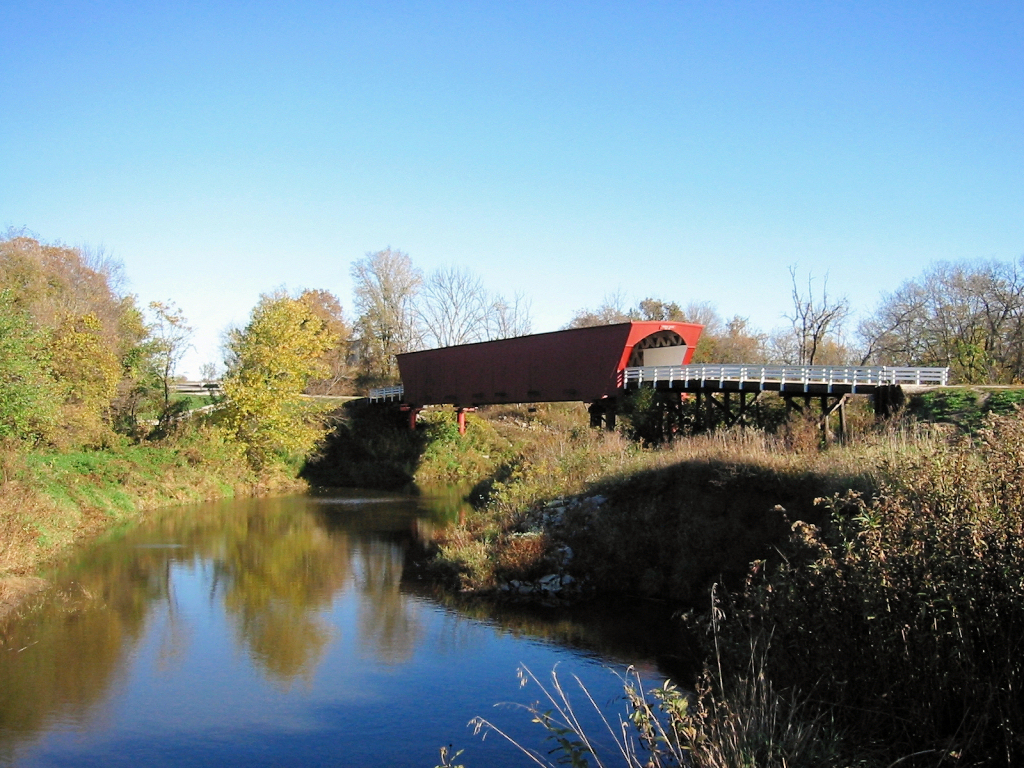
Roseman Bridge

Winterset is widely known for its covered bridges. A total of six covered bridges are located in Madison County, including one in Winterset City Park. The annual Covered Bridge Festival celebrates the bridges and local heritage every second weekend in October.

The Winterset Stage is Madison County's live theatre venue providing family friendly dinner theatre, including musicals and concerts while offering a variety of children's theatre and educational programming. The Winterset Stage is a nonprofit 501(c)(3) organization located at 405 East Madison in Winterset.

Another notable landmark is Clark Tower, located in Winterset City Park, which offers panoramic views of the surrounding Middle River Valley area.

The Madison County Courthouse, in the middle of the town square, was built in 1868, and rebuilt in 1876 after being partially destroyed by fire.

=== Museums ===
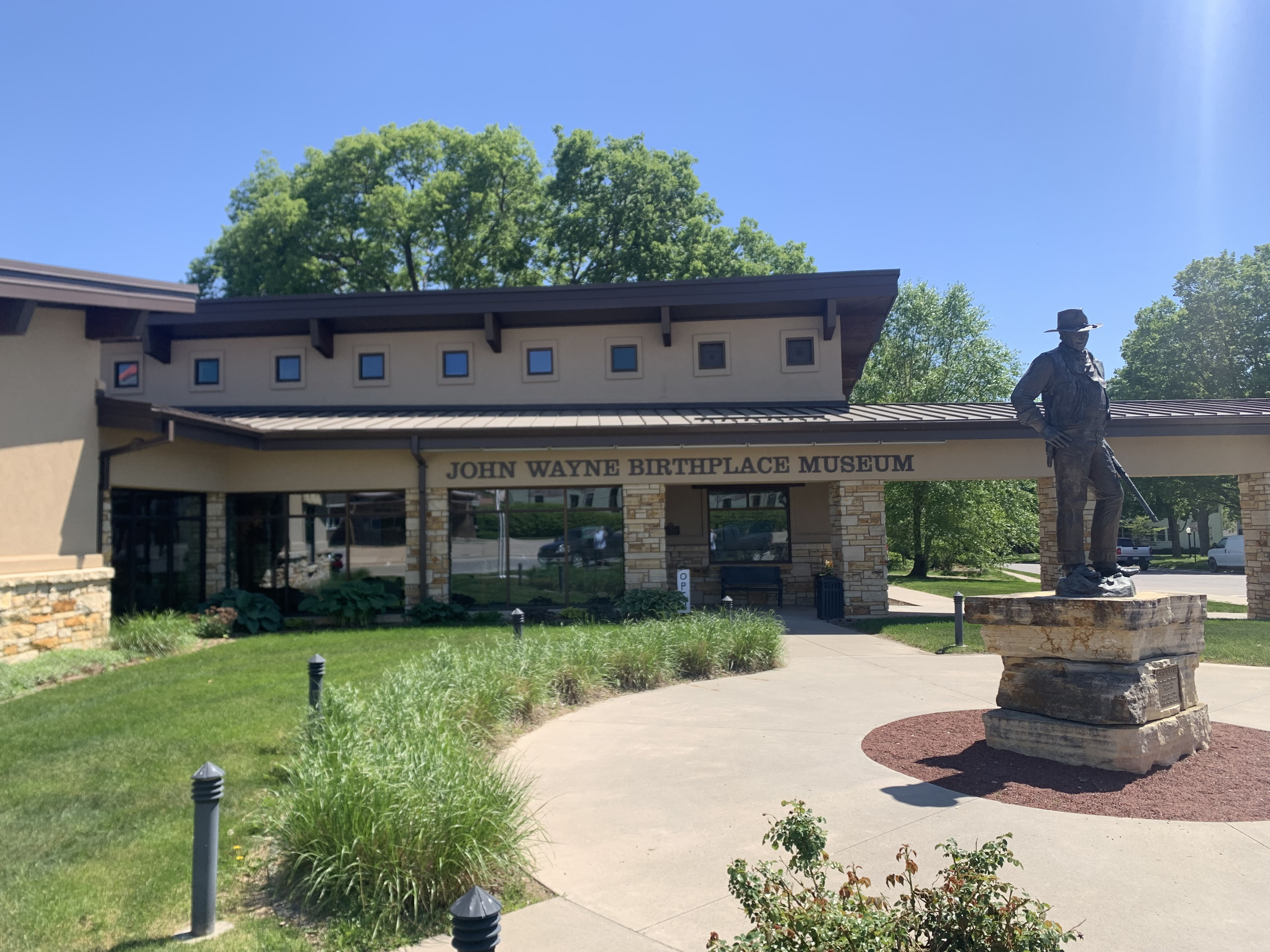
John Wayne Birthplace Museum in Winterset

In 2015, the John Wayne Birthplace Museum opened kitty-corner from Wayne's birthplace home. The $2.5 million, 6,000-sq. ft. facility houses scripts, costumes, set pieces, posters, personal correspondence, an original Andy Warhol painting and a custom-made 1972 Pontiac station wagon. The museum is divided into three exhibitions: "The Actor", "The Family Man", and "The American". It is located at 205 S. John Wayne Dr. in Winterset.

The Iowa Quilt Museum offers seasonal exhibits and regular workshops. The current president of the museum, Marianne Fons, is the founder of the well known quilting show Fons & Porter's Love of Quilting. The museum is located on the south side of the town square at 68 E. Court Ave.

The Madison County Historical Society is an 25-acre complex on the south side of town featuring a museum and 14 restored and historical buildings. The focal point of the complex is the Victorian Bevington Mansion. Built in 1856, the mansion, barn and 3-hole privy have been fully restored and placed on the National Register of Historic Places. The complex is open May through October and is located at 815 S. 2nd Ave.

== Education ==
The Winterset Community School District operates local public schools.

=== Popular culture ===
Winterset was used as a shooting location for the films Cold Turkey (1971), The Bridges of Madison County (1995), The Crazies (2010), and Winterset (2025).

== Notable people ==
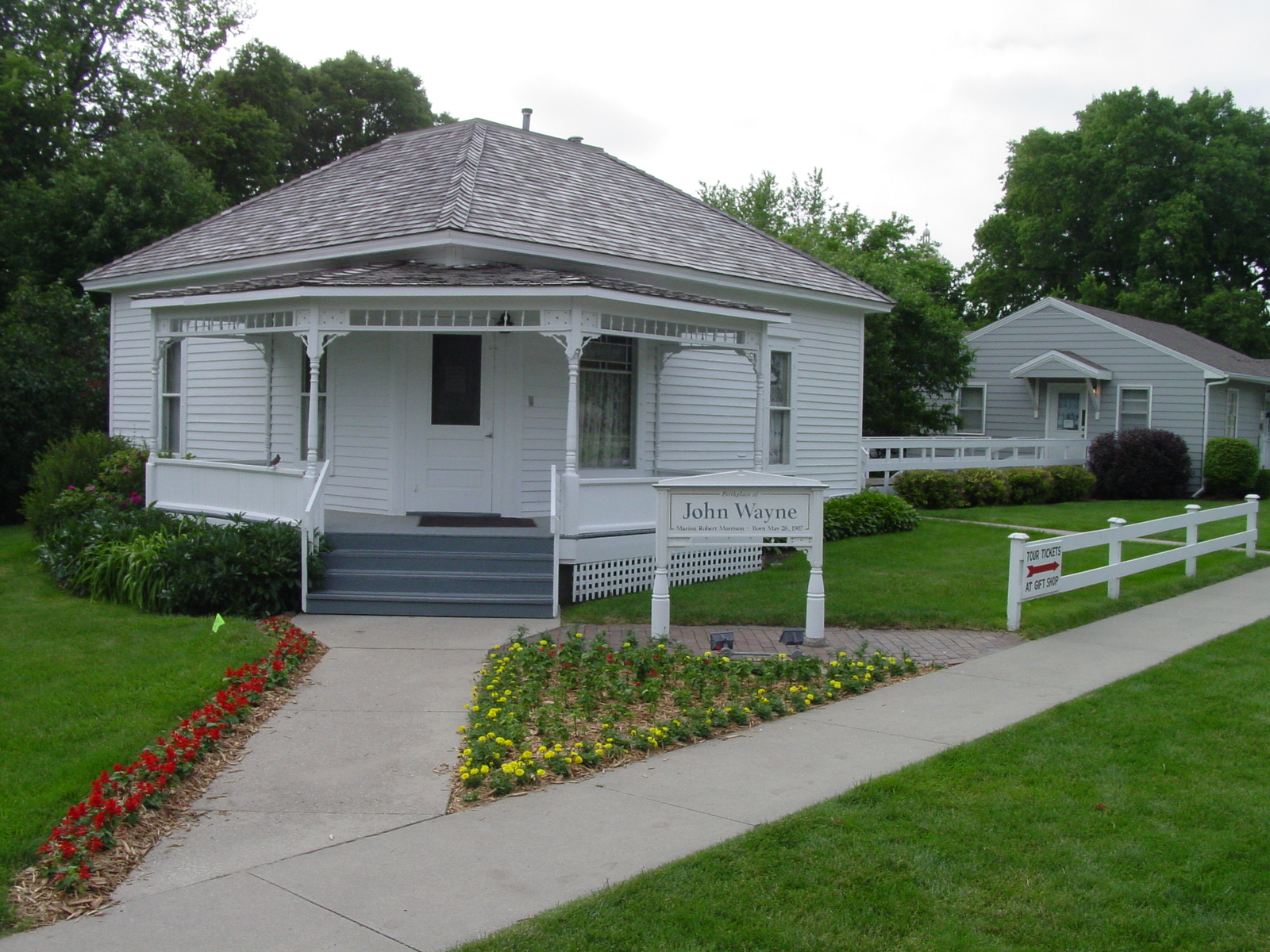
Birthplace of John Wayne

- Robert O. Bare, Marine Corps lieutenant general
- William D. Bond, racing driver and mechanical engineer for General Motors
- Fred Clarke, member of the Baseball Hall of Fame
- Henry J. B. Cummings, U.S. representative from Iowa
- Gail Huff, American broadcast journalist; wife of former U.S. senator and ambassador Scott Brown
- Marquis Lafayette McPherson, member of the Iowa Senate
- Mark Pearson, TV and radio personality
- Edward McMurray Smith, Iowa secretary of state
- George L. Stout, art conservation pioneer, World War II "Monument Man"
- Henry Cantwell Wallace, US Secretary of Agriculture
- John Wayne, actor
