= Clarkson, Iowa =

- former Unincorporated community
- Location within the state of Iowa Clarkson, Iowa (the United States)
- Coordinates: 41°50′05″N 93°45′10″W
- Country: United States
- State: Iowa
- County: Warren
- Elevation: 935 ft (285 m)
- Time zone: UTC-6 (Central (CST))
  - Summer (DST): UTC-5 (CDT)
- Area code: 515
- GNIS feature ID: 464256

Clarkson was an unincorporated community in Warren County, Iowa, United States. It was located two miles east of Carlisle, near the Des Moines River. Its elevation was 935 feet.

== History ==
Clarkson was founded as a whistle-stop along the Chicago, Burlington and Quincy Railroad, but never grew very large. Clarkson's population was 30 in 1887, 16 in 1902, and 32 in 1925.

Clarkson was a "once-thriving whistle-stop of the Victorian era" located on the Des Moines River floodplain. According to author Nancy Mae Osborn, "The Clarkson post office was discontinued on 30 June 1906 and its former patrons received delivery out of Carlisle [...] Gradually the buildings that had once comprised Clarkson were torn down, leaving only two farm houses. These, along with the Clarkson railroad depot sign, were removed in 1967 after the U.S. Army Corps of Engineers had acquired the property."

The population was 16 in 1940. Today nothing remains of the Clarkson townsite.
