= Summerset Trail =

Rail trail in Iowa, United States

Coordinates: 41.364099°N 93.555222°W

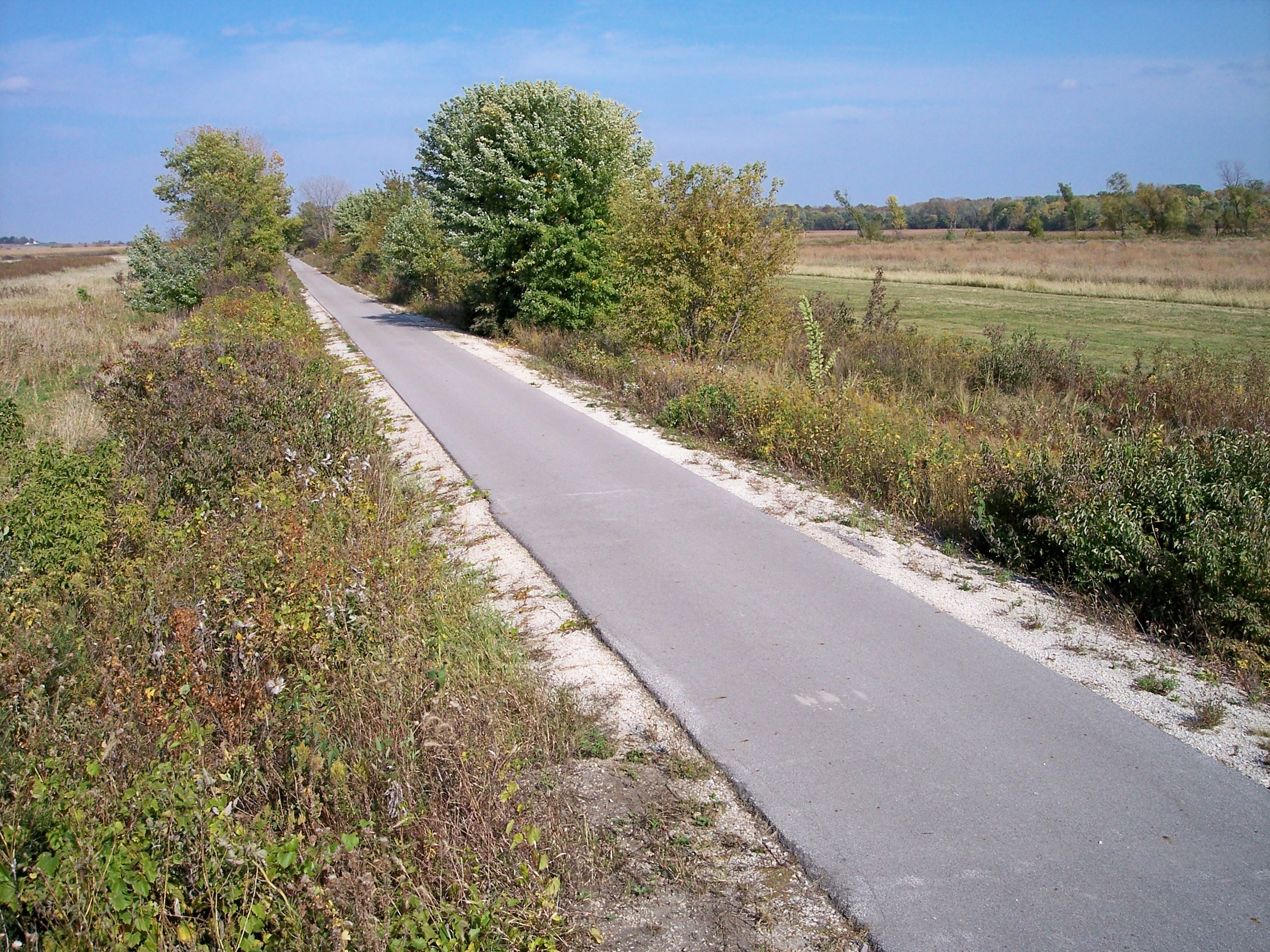
The Summerset Trail near Banner Lakes at Summerset State Park

The Summerset Trail is a rail trail in Warren County in south-central Iowa in the United States.

The trail is 11.1 miles (17.9 km) long and is paved with asphalt. It follows the route of an abandoned rail line between the cities of Carlisle at its northeastern end and Indianola at the southwest. The trail passes remnants of prairie, wetlands along the Middle River southwest of Carlisle, and woodlands north of Indianola.

== Facilities ==
Trailheads are at Carlisle and Indianola, and at the trail's midpoint at Banner Lakes at Summerset State Park. The Carlisle trailhead consists of a parking lot and a small portable toilet. The trailhead at Banner Lakes at Summerset State Park is located at the end of Elk Horn St. (which is accessible from Highway 65-69). There is a pit toilet facility in the parking lot of the Banner Lakes Trailhead, and the trail can also be accessed through the park loop road. In Indianola, the trailhead is located at the 300 block of East 5th street, at the junction of the Summerset trail and the 1.6-mile (2.6 km) long McVay Trail which ends at Pickard Park in Indianola.

== Ride ==
Riding from north to south, riders start at the Carlisle parking area and travel southwest through the outskirts of town. The trail parallels 165th street (which merges into Dubuque Pl) for approximately 4 miles (6.4 km). The terrain is flat, and features both fields and wetland conservation areas. The entire northern section of the trail has no gain or loss in elevation. When the trail turns south at Banner Lakes, it crosses the Middle River bridge, and riders will notice the start of a gradual uphill climb for the rest of the length of the trail. South of the Middle River, the terrain becomes gentle rolling hills and prairie remnants. The Summerset trail ends at the Indianola trailhead, however riders can continue on the short McVay trail. The McVay trail heads downhill south of the trailhead through a deeply wooded area.

== Sights ==
The trail features many bird and wildlife watching opportunities, especially in the wetlands conservation areas in the northern part of the trail. Many people who ride the trail prefer to start at the northern end, to avoid the "hill" into Indianola at the end of a 22-mile (35 km) ride.

== See also ==
- List of rail trails
