= Middle River (Iowa) =

River in Iowa, United States

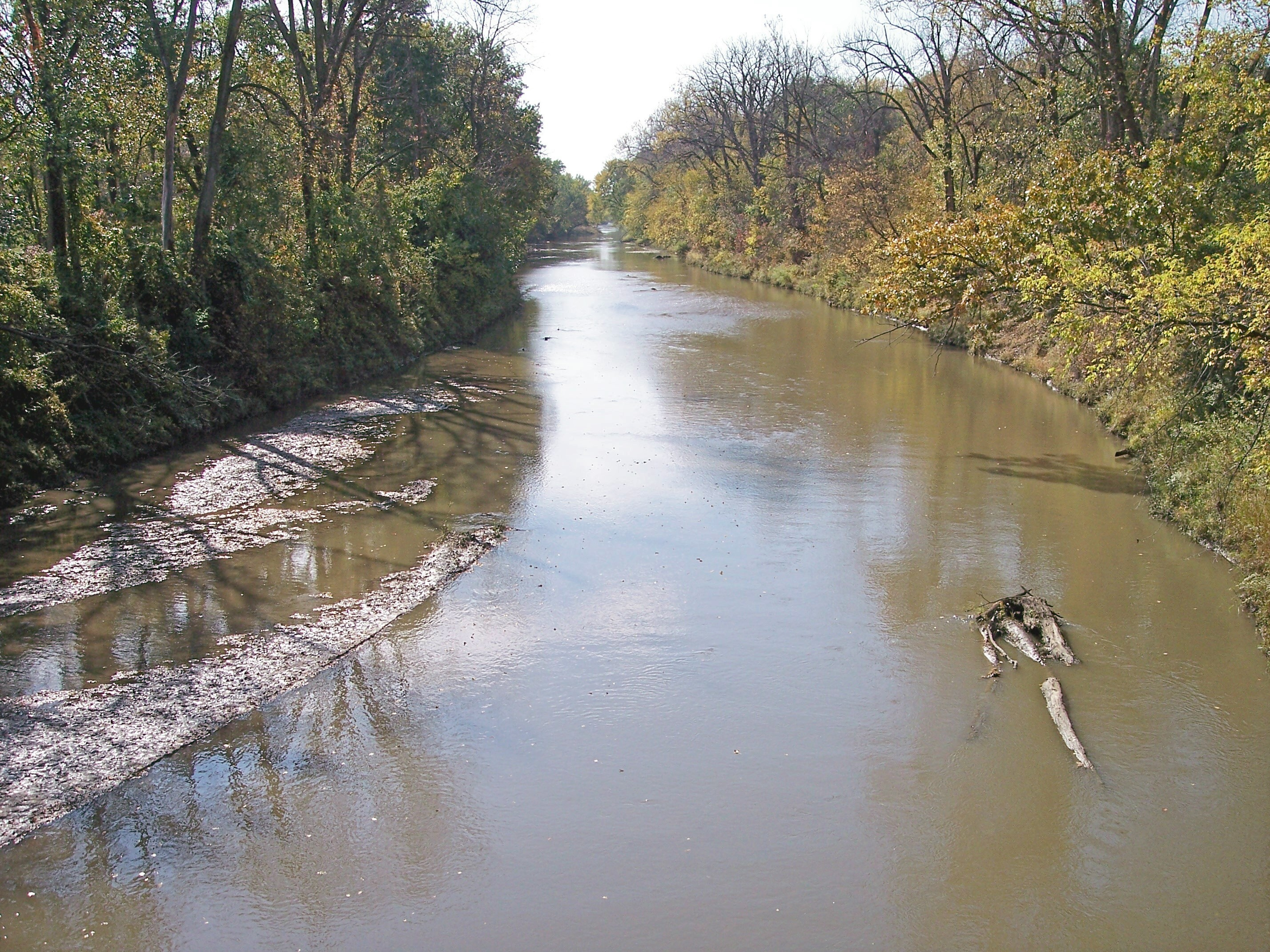
- The Middle River, looking upstream from the Summerset Trail in Warren County

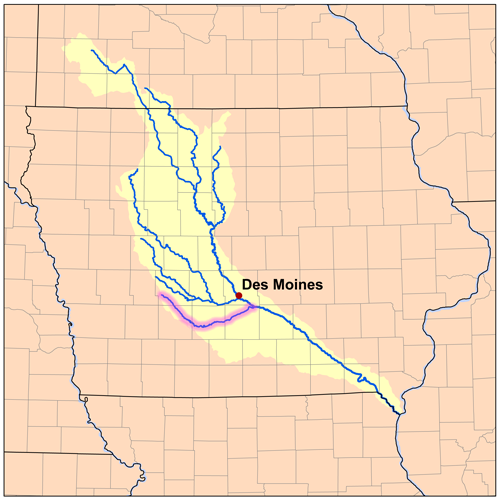
- Map of the Des Moines River watershed with the Middle River highlighted

Location
- Country: US
- State: Iowa
- District: Warren, Madison, Adair and Guthrie counties

Physical characteristics
- Source
  - coordinates: 41.590°N 94.695°W
  - elevation: 1,466 ft (447 m)
- Mouth: Des Moines River
  - location: US
  - coordinates: 41.482°N 93.402°W
  - elevation: 758 ft (231 m)
- Length: 123 miles (198 km)
- Basin size: 489.5 square miles (1,268 km^{2})
- Discharge
  - location: Indianola, Iowa
  - average: 300 cu/ft. per sec.

Basin features
- Tributaries
  - right: South Fork Middle River

The Middle River is a tributary of the Des Moines River in south-central Iowa in the United States. It is 123 miles (198 km) long and drains an area of 489.5 square miles (1,268 km^{2}). Via the Des Moines River, it is part of the watershed of the Mississippi River.

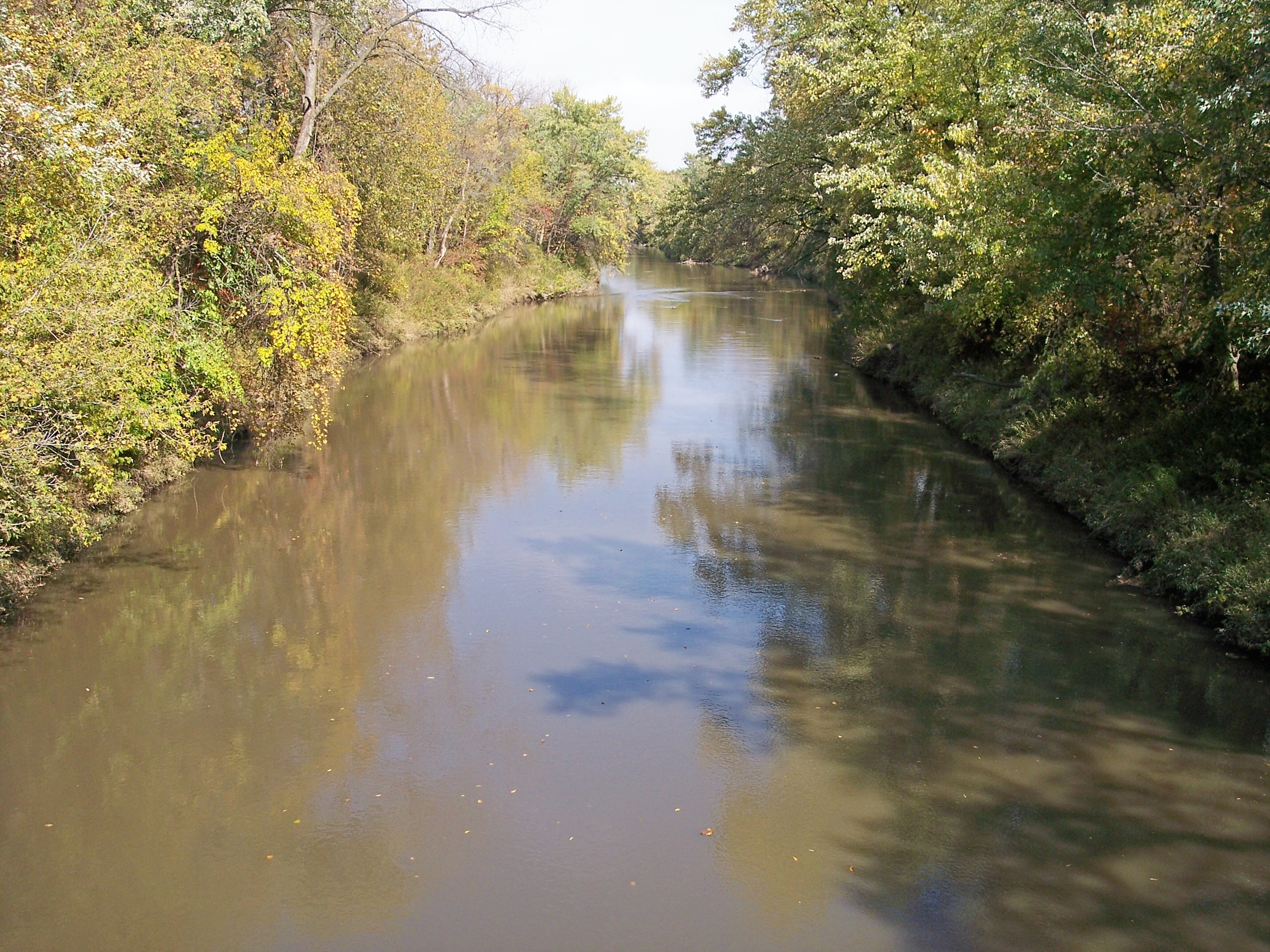
The Middle River, looking downstream from the Summerset Trail

The Middle River rises in southwestern Guthrie County and initially flows southeastwardly through Adair County, then eastwardly through Madison County, then east-northeastwardly through Warren County, passing the towns of Casey, Winterset, Patterson, Bevington, Martensdale, Spring Hill and Carlisle. A substantial portion of the Middle River's course through Warren County has been straightened and channelized. It joins the Des Moines River in Warren County near Carlisle, 13 miles (21 km) southeast of Des Moines.

A short headwaters tributary of the river is known as the South Fork Middle River. It rises near the western edge of Guthrie County, about a mile north of Adair, at an elevation of 1,433 feet (437 m) and flows generally east-southeast for about five miles (8.0 km) passing just south of Casey before turning northeast as it empties into the Middle River just east of Casey at an elevation of 1,195 feet (364 m).

== See also ==
- List of Iowa rivers
- Roseman Covered Bridge
