= Beech, Iowa =

- unincorporated community
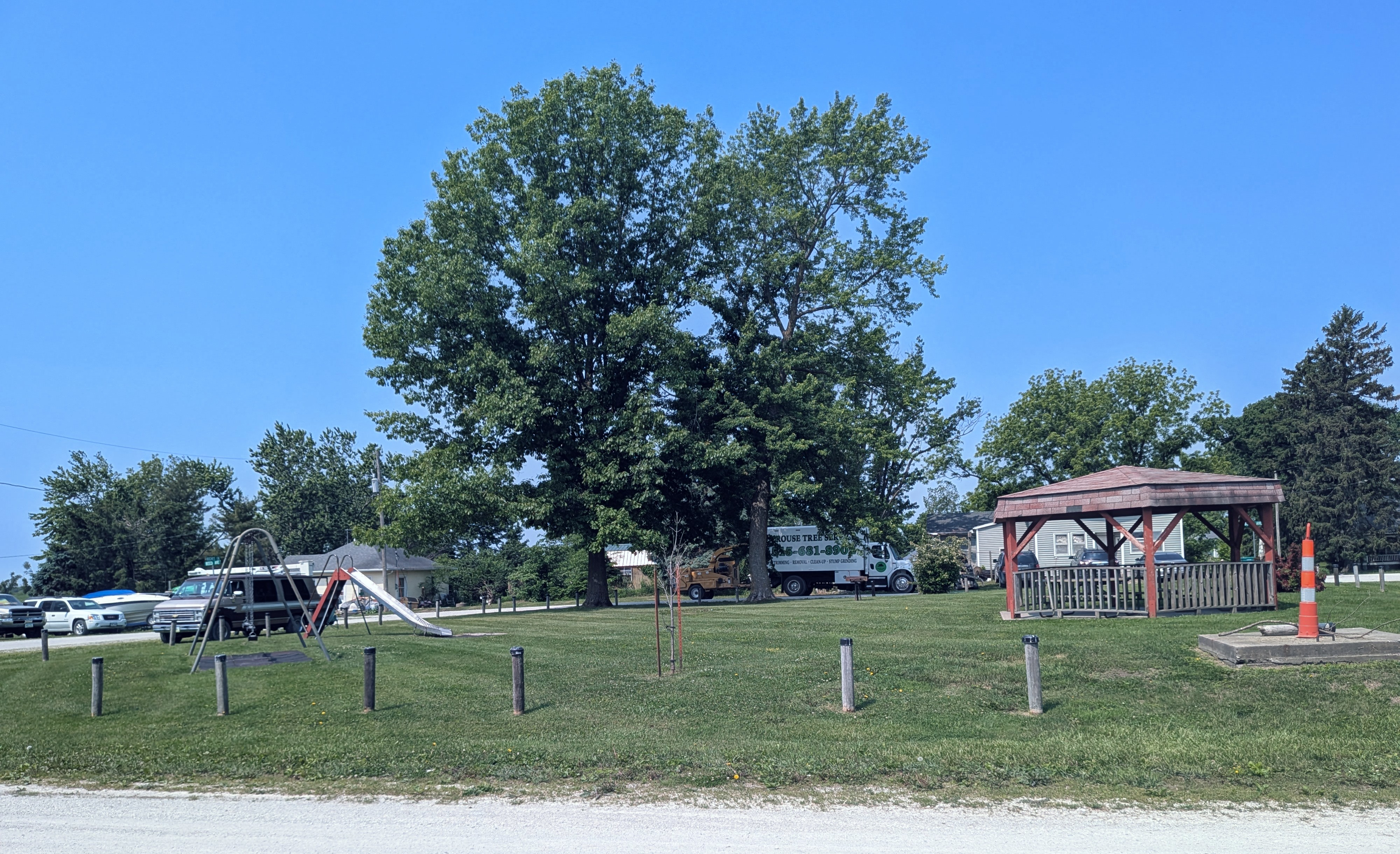
- Beech community park

- Location within Iowa
- Country: US
- State: Iowa
- County: Warren County
- Founded: 1911
- Elevation: 277 m (909 ft)
- Time zone: UTC-6 (Central (CST))
  - Summer (DST): UTC-5 (CDT)
- GNIS feature ID: 454480

Beech is an unincorporated community in Warren County, Iowa, United States. It is located just north of the intersection of County Road S31 and Highway 92. It is 1 mile east of Sandyville and five miles west of Pleasantville, at 41.3745865N -93.3573103W.

== History ==
Founded in 1911 as a railroad town, Beech was originally known as New Sandyville, but the residents of nearby Sandyville objected to the name. The town was renamed Beech in honor of a railroad employee.

The population was 133 in 1940.

== Education ==
The Pleasantville Community School District operates local public schools.

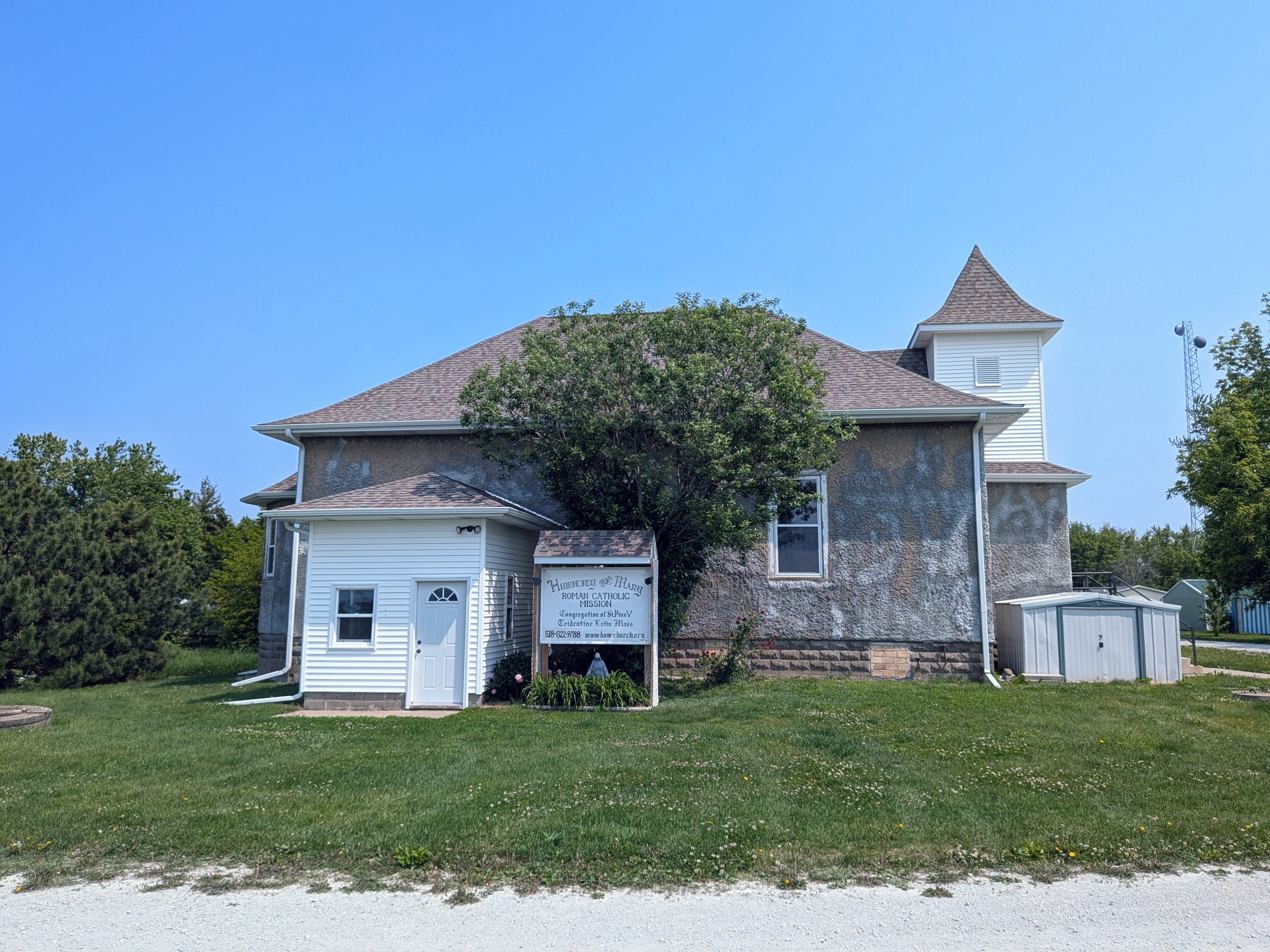
Humility of Mary Catholic Church in Beech
