= Banner Lakes at Summerset State Park =

State park in Warren County, Iowa

- Location within Iowa Location within the United States
- Interactive map of Banner Lakes at Summerset State Park
- Location: Warren County, Iowa, United States
- Nearest city: Indianola, Iowa
- Coordinates: 41°26′44″N 93°33′25″W
- Area: 222 acres (90 ha)
- Established: 2004
- Administrator: Iowa Department of Natural Resources
- Website: Official website

Banner Lakes at Summerset State Park is a 222-acre (90 ha) state park in Warren County, Iowa, United States, near the city of Indianola. Opened in 2004, the park is located on the site of a 1930s-era coal mine; its two namesake lakes were formed from the remnants of the mine.

Both lakes at Banner Lakes are stocked with trout and are also home to bluegill, channel catfish, crappie, and largemouth bass. Each lake has its own boat ramp. The park is also popular with bicyclists, as it contains a 2-mile (3.2 km) paved loop trail that links with the longer Summerset Trail and six mountain bike courses. It also includes several hiking trails. The Banner Shooting Range, which is also run by the Iowa Department of Natural Resources, is adjacent to the park.
