= Greenfield Township, Warren County, Iowa =

Township in Warren County, Iowa, U.S.

Coordinates: 41.45944°N 93.61944°W

Greenfield Township is one of the sixteen townships of Warren County, Iowa, United States. Its estimated population as of 2008 is 5,773 people, with a density of 138 people per square mile (53 people/km^{2}). Three cities have land in Greenfield (Norwalk, Spring Hill, and Des Moines—the state capital), as well as two unincorporated areas (Greenbush and Scotch Ridge). The township has two cemeteries (Webb Cemetery and North Ridge).

== Geography ==
At an elevation of 896 feet (273 m), Greenfield Township covers an area of 41.8 square miles (108 km^{2}). The North River, a tributary of the Des Moines River, passes through Greenfield Township.
