= Avery Craven =

American historian

- Born: August 12, 1885; Ackworth, Iowa, United States
- Died: January 21, 1980 (aged 94); Chesterton, Indiana, United States
- Education: Simpson College (B.A., 1908); Harvard University (M.A., 1914); University of Chicago (Ph.D., 1923)
- Occupations: Scholar, historian, author, professor
- Honors: President of the Organization of American Historians (1963-1964)

Avery Odelle Craven (August 12, 1885 – January 21, 1980) was an American historian who wrote extensively about the nineteenth-century United States, the American Civil War and Congressional Reconstruction from a then-revisionist viewpoint sympathetic to the Lost Cause as well as democratic failings during his own lifetime.

== Early life and education ==
Craven was born near Ackworth, Iowa. His parents were Quakers who left North Carolina because of slavery and racism. Craven graduated from Simpson College (affiliated with the Methodist Church) in Indianola, Iowa, in 1908, and at his death he left his library and papers to that institution.

After briefly teaching at Simpson College and North High School in Des Moines, Iowa, Craven moved to Cambridge, Massachusetts, where he was influenced by Frederick Jackson Turner and earned an M.A. from Harvard in 1914.

Craven then married and taught at North Division High School in Milwaukee, Wisconsin, until 1920, when he moved to Chicago to complete a doctorate in history under the guidance of Marcus Jernegan and William E. Dodd. He received his PhD from the University of Chicago in 1923. He received honorary doctorates from Tulane University and Cambridge University in 1952, as well as from the College of Emporia in 1974, Purdue University in 1969, Western Michigan University in 1963, the University of South Carolina in 1961, Wayne State University in 1957, and from his alma mater, Simpson College in 1945). He married for a second time in 1938.

== Career ==
Craven first taught at the graduate level at Michigan State University (1923–1924) and then the University of Illinois (1924–1927). In 1927, he joined the faculty of the University of Chicago, where he spent the rest of his career. His works included The Coming of the Civil War (University of Chicago Press, 1942), The Growth of Southern Nationalism, 1848–1861 (LSU Press 1953) and Reconstruction, and the Ending of the Civil War (Holt Rinehart & Winston, Inc. 1968). He served as president of the Organization of Southern Historians in 1952, as president of the Mississippi Valley Historical Society and of the Organization of American Historians (OAH) in 1963–1964.

== Views ==
Craven was a leader of the "revisionist" historians in the 1930s who said the Civil War was caused by a failure of democracy. He rejected the "progressive" school of Charles A. Beard, which argued the war was an inevitable conflict between the agrarian South and the industrial North.

Craven increasingly took a pro-Southern and even pro-slavery position on the causes of the Civil War. His explanation of the war was basically psychological and argued, according to John David Smith that "fear, suspicion, passion, propaganda, distortion" caused the war. Craven especially emphasized exaggerated abolitionist attacks on slavery and argued that the war could have been avoided if selfish politicians had not escalated the psychological fears to their own advantage.

In his first book Craven argued that tobacco caused systematic soil depletion that shaped both agricultural development and the broader socio-economic order. Agriculture in Virginia and Maryland relied on a single crop and exploitative practices, causing declining yields and exhausted lands. Land that had originally been highly fertile became useless and was abandoned on a wide scale. Planters realized the waste and knew they would have to move on to fresh land. The lack of proper plowing and cultivation methods led to destructive erosion, while continuous replanting depleted essential plant nutrients and encouraged harmful soil organisms. The failure to add organic matter or fertilizers worsened the situation. As a result, expansion became necessary to maintain productivity, leading to social, economic, and political conflicts, as well as a decline in living standards. Although some observers blamed slavery as a major cause, Craven discounts its role in soil exhaustion.

== Death and legacy ==
Craven died in Chesterton, Indiana, in 1980 and his remains were returned for burial in Iowa. His alma mater, Simpson College, received his library and papers.

Until July 2020, the Organization of American Historians gave an annual award named after Craven, "for the most original book on the coming of the Civil War, the Civil War years, or the Era of Reconstruction, with the exception of works of purely military history. The exception recognize[d] and reflect[ed] the Quaker convictions of Craven, President of the Organization of American Historians 1963-1964." In July 2020, the group's board decided “to suspend the name of the Avery Craven Award … as a result of consideration of a powerful article" by historian David Varel arguing that Craven's Lost Cause advocacy meant the change would “better honor the OAH’s professed commitment to ‘the equitable treatment of all practitioners of history.’” Varel proposed naming the award instead for the late scholar Lawrence D. Reddick. Before giving the award any new name, the OAH board appointed a committee to write guidelines for the establishing and naming of prizes and then solicited submissions of new names to consider for the award, designated in the meantime as the Civil War and Reconstruction Book Award.

== Works ==
- Craven, Avery. Soil Exhaustion as a Factor in the Agricultural History of Virginia and Maryland, 1606–1860 (1926, reprinted University of South Carolina Press, 2006)
- Craven, Avery O. "The Agricultural Reformers of the Ante-Bellum South." American Historical Review 33.2 (1928) pp: 302–314. in JSTOR
- Craven, Avery O. "Poor Whites and Negroes in the Antebellum South." Journal of Negro History (1930) pp: 14–25. in JSTOR
- Craven, Avery. Edmund Ruffin, Southerner: A Study in Session (1932).
- Craven, Avery. "Coming of the War Between the States, An Interpretation." Journal of Southern History (1936) 2#3 pp: 303–322. in JSTOR
- Craven, Avery. "Frederick Jackson Turner." in The Marcus W. Jernegan Essays in American Historiography (1937) pp: 252–270.
- Craven, Avery. "The 'Turner Theories' and the South." Journal of Southern History (1939) 5#3 pp: 291–314. in JSTOR
- Craven, Avery. "The 1840s and the Democratic Process." Journal of Southern History (1950) 16#2 pp: 161–176. in JSTOR
- Craven, Avery. The Growth of Southern nationalism, 1848–1861 (LSU Press, 1953)
- Craven, Avery. The Coming of the Civil War (University of Chicago Press, 1957)
- Craven, Avery. An Historian and the Civil War (University of Chicago Press, 1964)
- Craven, Avery. Reconstruction:the Ending of the Civil War (Holt, Rinehart & Winston, Inc. 1968)
- Craven, Avery. Rachel of Old Louisiana (1974)
