= St. Marys, Iowa =

- City
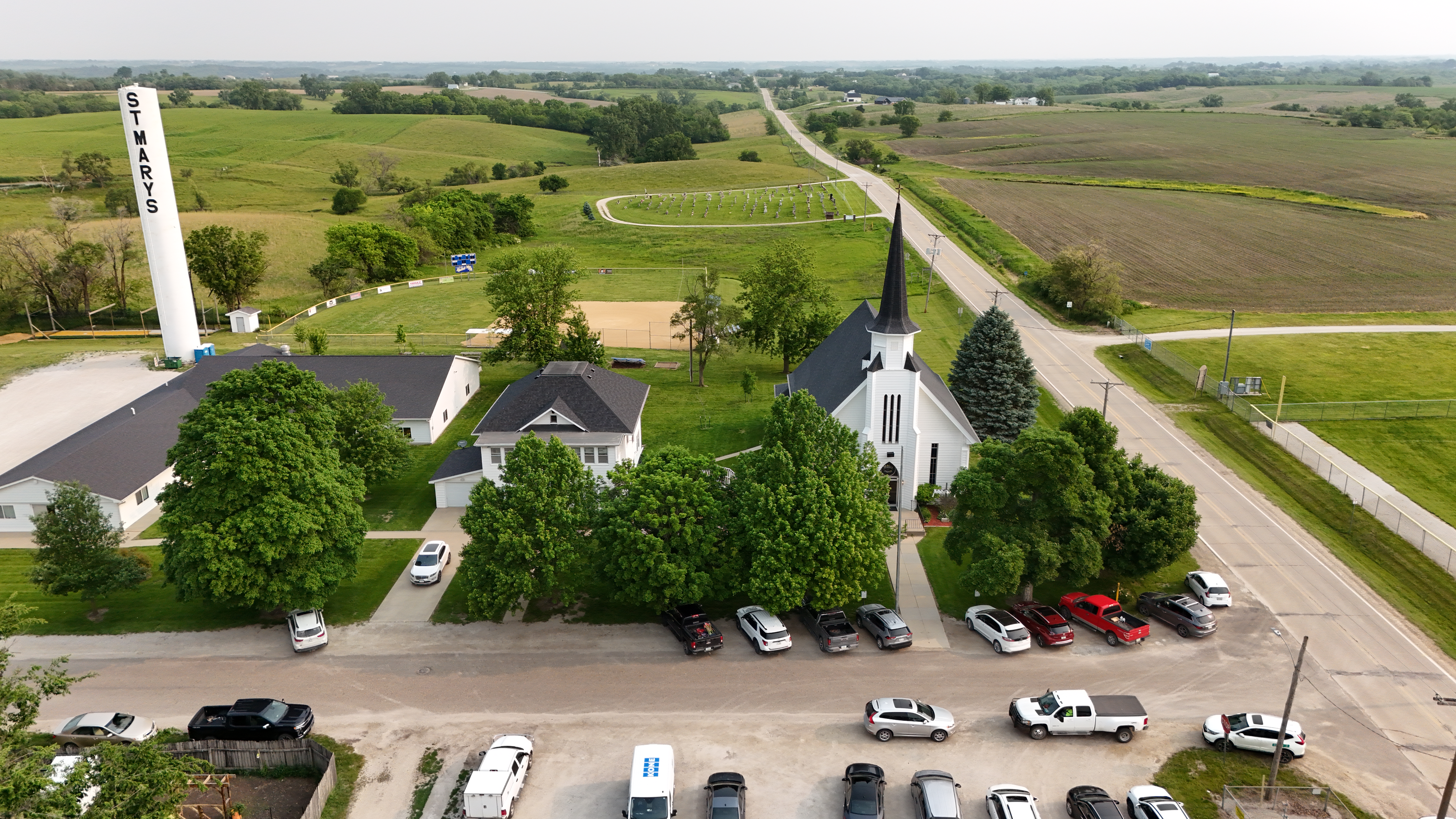
- St. Marys water tower and church

- Location of St. Marys, Iowa
- Coordinates: 41°18′28″N 93°44′02″W
- Country: USA
- State: Iowa
- County: Warren
- Incorporated: April 5, 1923

Area
  - Total: 0.14 sq mi (0.37 km^{2})
  - Land: 0.14 sq mi (0.37 km^{2})
  - Water: 0 sq mi (0.00 km^{2})
- Elevation: 1,037 ft (316 m)

Population (2020)
  - Total: 108
  - Density: 764.9/sq mi (295.33/km^{2})
- Time zone: UTC-6 (Central (CST))
  - Summer (DST): UTC-5 (CDT)
- FIPS code: 19-70095
- GNIS feature ID: 2396506
- Website: www.saintmarysiowa.com

St. Marys or Saint Marys is a city in Warren County, Iowa, United States. The population was 108 at the time of the 2020 census.

St. Marys is part of the Des Moines–West Des Moines Metropolitan Statistical Area.

== History ==
St. Marys (originally spelled St. Mary's with the apostrophe s) was laid out about 1870.

== Geography ==
According to the United States Census Bureau, the city has a total area of 0.14 square miles (0.36 km^{2}), all of it land.

== Demographics ==
Historical populations
Year	Pop.	±%
1880	35	—
1890	42	+20.0%
1900	62	+47.6%
1910	69	+11.3%
1920	73	+5.8%
1930	89	+21.9%
1940	84	−5.6%
1950	89	+6.0%
1960	94	+5.6%
1970	105	+11.7%
1980	111	+5.7%
1990	113	+1.8%
2000	134	+18.6%
2010	127	−5.2%
2020	108	−15.0%
Source:"U.S. Census website". United States Census Bureau. and Iowa Data Center; Source: U.S. Decennial Census

=== 2020 census ===
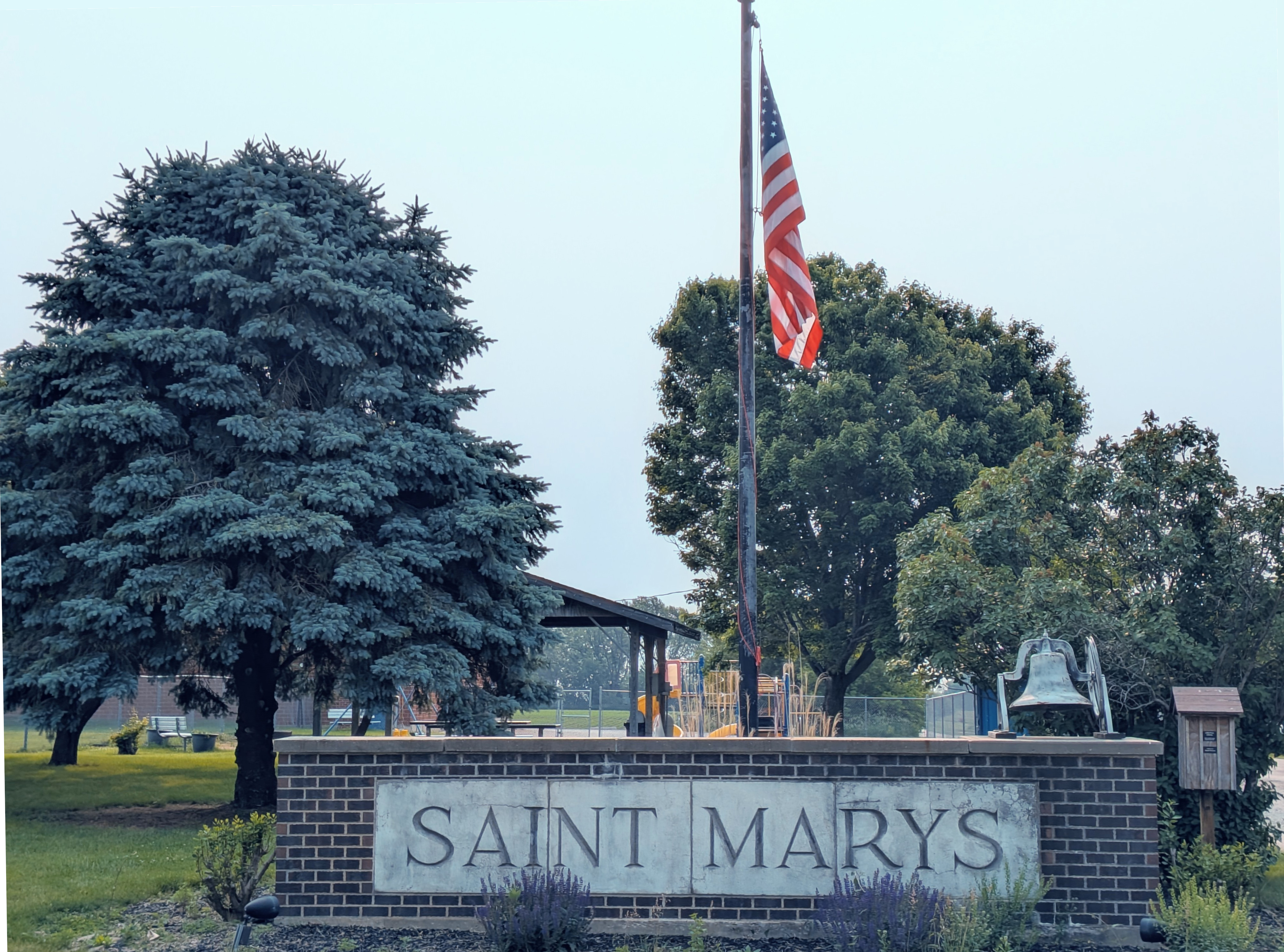
St. Marys city park

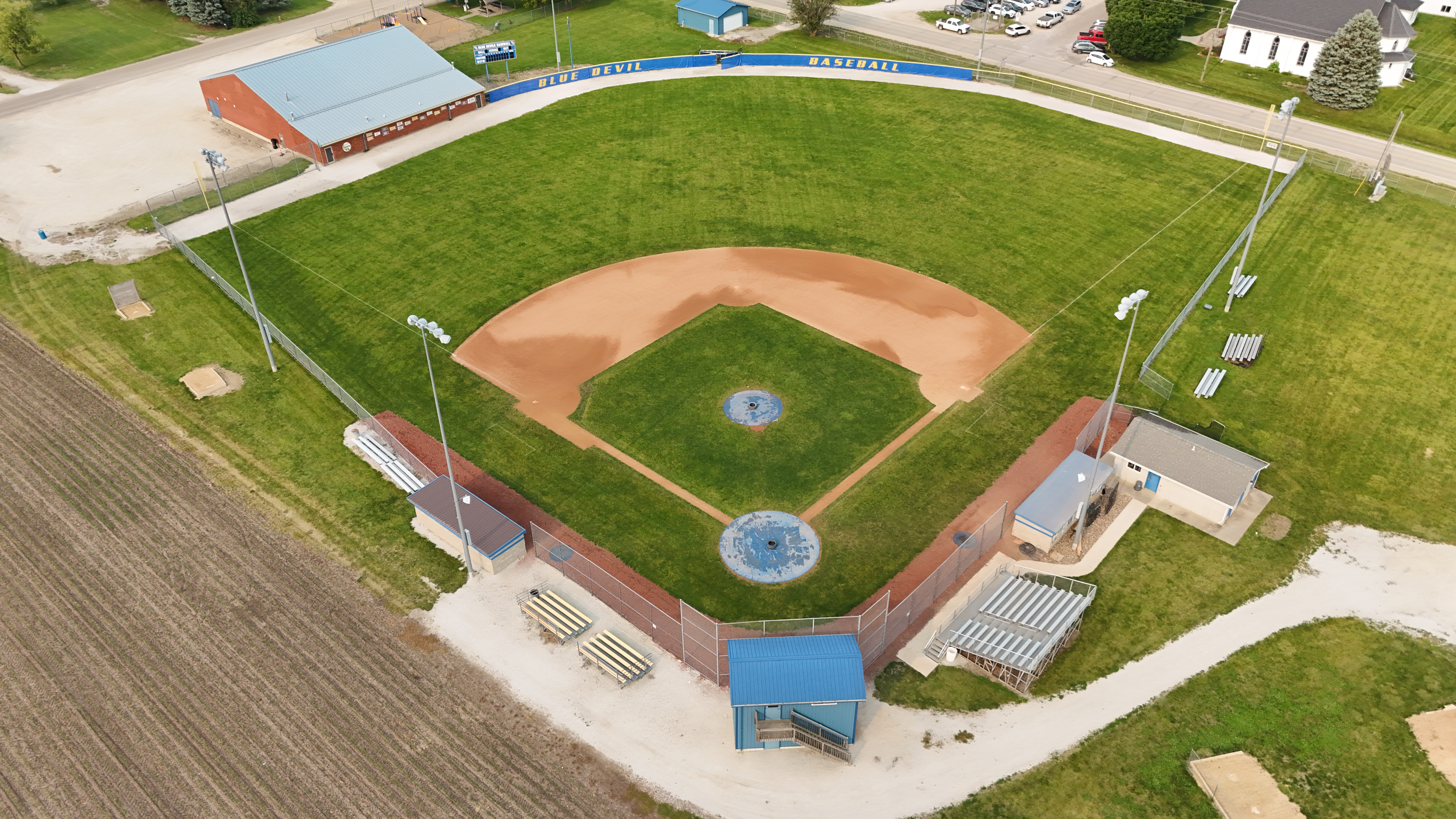
Blue Devil baseball field in St. Marys

As of the census of 2020, there were 108 people, 44 households, and 36 families residing in the city. The population density was 767.4 inhabitants per square mile (296.3/km^{2}). There were 45 housing units at an average density of 319.8 per square mile (123.5/km^{2}). The racial makeup of the city was 96.3% White, 0.0% Black or African American, 0.0% Native American, 0.0% Asian, 0.0% Pacific Islander, 0.0% from other races and 3.7% from two or more races. Hispanic or Latino persons of any race comprised 2.8% of the population.

Of the 44 households, 43.2% of which had children under the age of 18 living with them, 47.7% were married couples living together, 9.1% were cohabitating couples, 15.9% had a female householder with no spouse or partner present and 27.3% had a male householder with no spouse or partner present. 18.2% of all households were non-families. 13.6% of all households were made up of individuals, 2.3% had someone living alone who was 65 years old or older.

The median age in the city was 37.5 years. 21.3% of the residents were under the age of 20; 7.4% were between the ages of 20 and 24; 25.0% were from 25 and 44; 25.9% were from 45 and 64; and 20.4% were 65 years of age or older. The gender makeup of the city was 46.3% male and 53.7% female.

=== 2010 census ===
At the 2010 census there were 127 people in 42 households, including 34 families, in the city. The population density was 907.1 inhabitants per square mile (350.2/km^{2}). There were 46 housing units at an average density of 328.6 per square mile (126.9/km^{2}). The racial makup of the city was 99.2% White and 0.8% from two or more races. Hispanic or Latino of any race were 1.6%.

Of the 42 households 50.0% had children under the age of 18 living with them, 59.5% were married couples living together, 19.0% had a female householder with no husband present, 2.4% had a male householder with no wife present, and 19.0% were non-families. 16.7% of households were one person and 11.9% were one person aged 65 or older. The average household size was 3.02 and the average family size was 3.35.

The median age was 37.6 years. 35.4% of residents were under the age of 18; 6.4% were between the ages of 18 and 24; 21.3% were from 25 to 44; 29.2% were from 45 to 64; and 7.9% were 65 or older. The gender makeup of the city was 44.1% male and 55.9% female.

=== 2000 census ===
At the 2000 census there were 134 people in 49 households, including 36 families, in the city. The population density was 968.3 inhabitants per square mile (373.9/km^{2}). There were 49 housing units at an average density of 354.1 per square mile (136.7/km^{2}). The racial makup of the city was 100.00% White. Hispanic or Latino of any race were 1.49%.

Of the 49 households 46.9% had children under the age of 18 living with them, 61.2% were married couples living together, 8.2% had a female householder with no husband present, and 26.5% were non-families. 24.5% of households were one person and 10.2% were one person aged 65 or older. The average household size was 2.73 and the average family size was 3.31.

The age distribution was 34.3% under the age of 18, 7.5% from 18 to 24, 32.1% from 25 to 44, 17.2% from 45 to 64, and 9.0% 65 or older. The median age was 36 years. For every 100 females, there were 94.2 males. For every 100 females age 18 and over, there were 91.3 males.

The median household income was $38,750 and the median family income was $49,500. Males had a median income of $28,929 versus $25,313 for females. The per capita income for the city was $16,747. None of the population and none of the families were below the poverty line.
