= Carlisle, Iowa =

- City
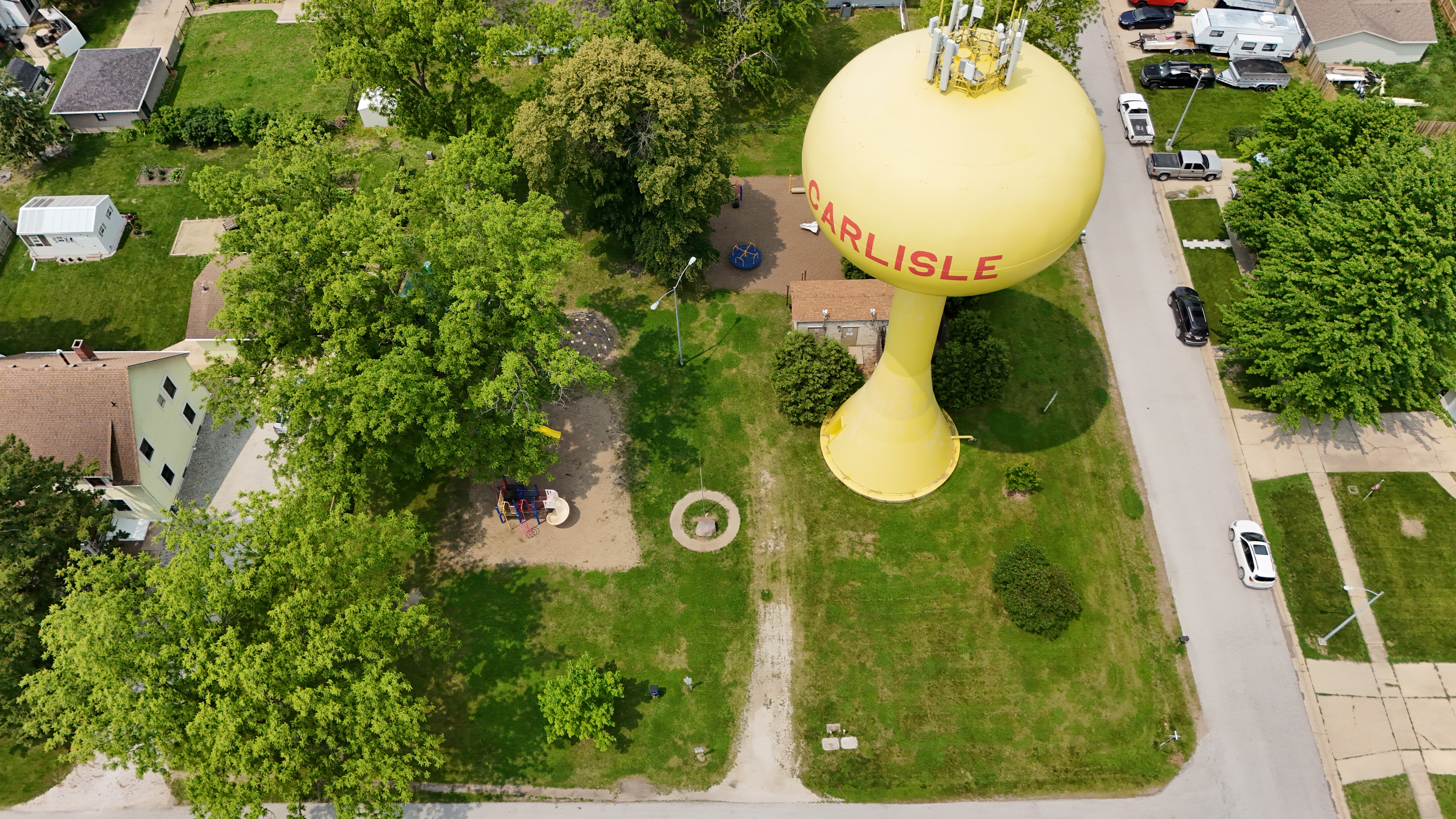
- Water Tower Park

- Seal Logo
- Motto: "The Natural Choice"
- Location of Carlisle, Iowa
- Coordinates: 41°30′43″N 93°30′11″W
- Country: United States
- State: Iowa
- Counties: Warren, Polk
- Townships: Allen (Warren County); Allen (Polk County)
- Founded: 1851
- Incorporated: May 10, 1870

Government
  - Type: Mayor-council government

Area
  - Total: 5.66 sq mi (14.65 km^{2})
  - Land: 5.65 sq mi (14.64 km^{2})
  - Water: 0.0039 sq mi (0.01 km^{2})
- Elevation: 771 ft (235 m)

Population (2020)
  - Total: 4,160
  - Density: 736.1/sq mi (284.21/km^{2})
- Time zone: UTC-6 (Central (CST))
  - Summer (DST): UTC-5 (CDT)
- ZIP code: 50047
- Area code: 515
- FIPS code: 19-10765
- GNIS feature ID: 2393745
- Website: carlisleiowa.org

Carlisle is a city in Warren and Polk counties in the U.S. state of Iowa. The population was 4,160 at the 2020 census. The city is part of the Des Moines–West Des Moines Metropolitan Statistical Area.

The city received considerable media attention in 1997 when Carlisle residents Kenny and Bobbi McCaughey (pronounced "McCoy") became the parents of the world's first surviving set of septuplets.

== History ==
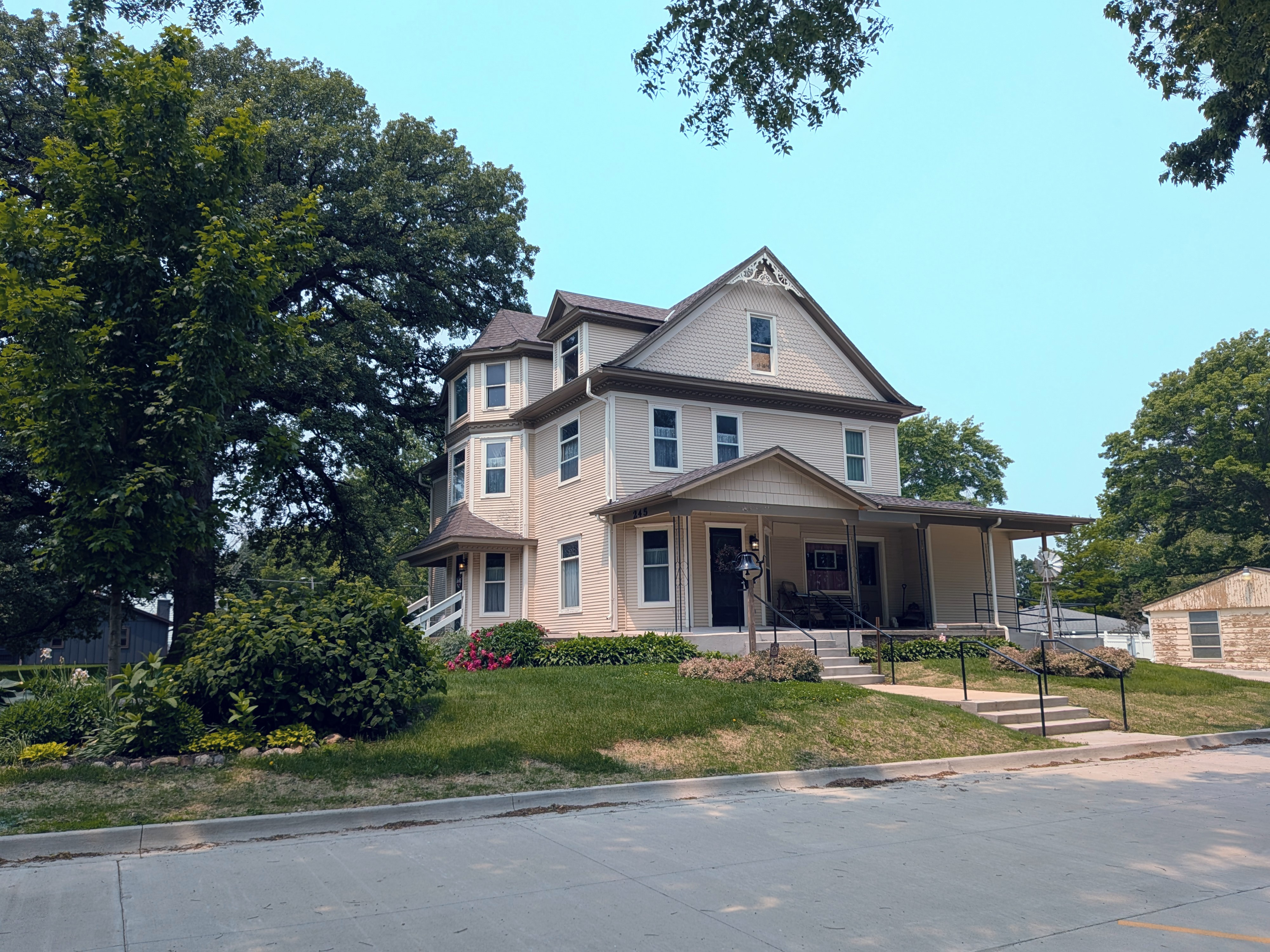
Randal House, a local landmark

=== Liberty and Dudley ===
Jeremiah "Uncle Jerry" Church was an early settler in Iowa, who arrived in Fort Des Moines in the summer of 1845. He laid out a new town in Polk County, just north of the border with Warren, in the winter of 1845 that he named Dudley. This was his second attempt at platting the town, the first attempt he had named Liberty and abandoned because the place that he had chosen turned out to be school land.

The tale goes that he staked his claim of Dudley at midnight on 1845-10-11 by the light of some burning Native American dwellings that he had set on fire. Church's plans for Dudley were ambitious; he wanted it to rival Des Moines, ran a ferry to the location himself, and even invited the territorial commissioners to consider it as a candidate for county seat of Polk County. But the town did not last very long, as it was destroyed by the Flood of 1851, the commissioners having earlier noted in their rejection of it for county seat that it was located on low ground.

=== Carlisle ===
So Church, who also founded Brooklyn, Iowa alongside T. K. Brooks and William Lamb (a town that he put forward as a contender for the state capital), set out on his third attempt at a town in Polk, which he named Carlisle and laid out in 1851 with David Moore. This was also located in Polk, 2 miles (3.2 km) south-west of the former Dudley, but the county borders were changed in 1852, which relocated it to the southern half of Allen Township, which was split in two in order to restore a so-called "stolen strip" in the north of Warren County.

Church himself had been the first merchant in Dudley, but the first merchant in its replacement was Abraham Shoemaker, previously a businessman in Dudley. Other firsts were Robert Nicholson, first mayor; Albert Petrie, the first child born there; William Buxton who built the first flour mill there; Jackson Shoemaker and Ellen Compton, the first couple to be married there; and Elias Compton, the first person to die there (in 1851).

It is named after Carlisle, Pennsylvania and was incorporated in May 1870. The town experienced growth in 1871 when the railroad was built through it, with the town's primary business area, until that time located at the top of a hill, moving down to the valley where the railway line was located, leaving the hill as a primarily residential area, with homes and churches.

Buxton's flour mill company was the Carlisle Flouring Mills, incorporated in 1854 with Buxton as chairman and John Leas as company secretary and treasurer. Other officers were Carlisle citizens A. B. Shoemaker, Daniel Moore, James Mount, Thomas Obriety, a Dr. Ward, Hugh Marshman, and Edwin Oaks. The actual mill, a 4 storey building housing two runs of burrs, was completed in June 1856, at a cost of US$10,500 (equivalent to $376,250 in 2025). Robert Nicholson bought it in 1863, and proceeded in 1874 to extend it lengthwise so that it could house five runs of burrs and two purifiers, driven by a 40 horsepower (30 kW) engine. By this point it had cost US$16,000 (equivalent to $573,333 in 2025).

Carlisle's first schoolhouse was built in 1853 and the building itself lasted through at least 1879, although by that time it had become merely a private home. Daniel Moore built it at a cost of US$393 (equivalent to $15,209 in 2025). The school itself closed some time in 1869 or 1870 when a 2 storey school house had been constructed to replace it, which was extended in 1879.

"Uncle Jerry" Church lived in Carlisle until his death in November 1874.

By 1879 the town had a population of around 500, four churches (Methodist, Baptist, Christian, and United Bretheren), two general stores, three groceries, three drug stores, four physicians, a blacksmith, a wagon maker, a mechanic, a grain dealer, a hotel, a pottery, a brick yard, a meat market, a tin, hardware, & cabinet shop, and a shoe shop. Its postmaster was Will R. Randleman, and its justices were J. F. Stivers (also a notary public) and J. E. McClintic.

== Geography ==
Carlisle is located between the North and Middle Rivers, near their confluences with the Des Moines River. According to the United States Census Bureau, the city has a total area of 5.56 square miles (14.40 km^{2}), all land.

The Summerset Trail has its northern terminus at Carlisle.

== Demographics ==
Historical populations
Year	Pop.	±%
1860	138	—
1870	200	+44.9%
1880	395	+97.5%
1890	409	+3.5%
1900	553	+35.2%
1910	592	+7.1%
1920	640	+8.1%
1930	663	+3.6%
1940	690	+4.1%
1950	903	+30.9%
1960	1,317	+45.8%
1970	2,246	+70.5%
1980	3,073	+36.8%
1990	3,241	+5.5%
2000	3,497	+7.9%
2010	3,876	+10.8%
2020	4,160	+7.3%
Source:"U.S. Census website". United States Census Bureau. and Iowa Data Center; Source: U.S. Decennial Census

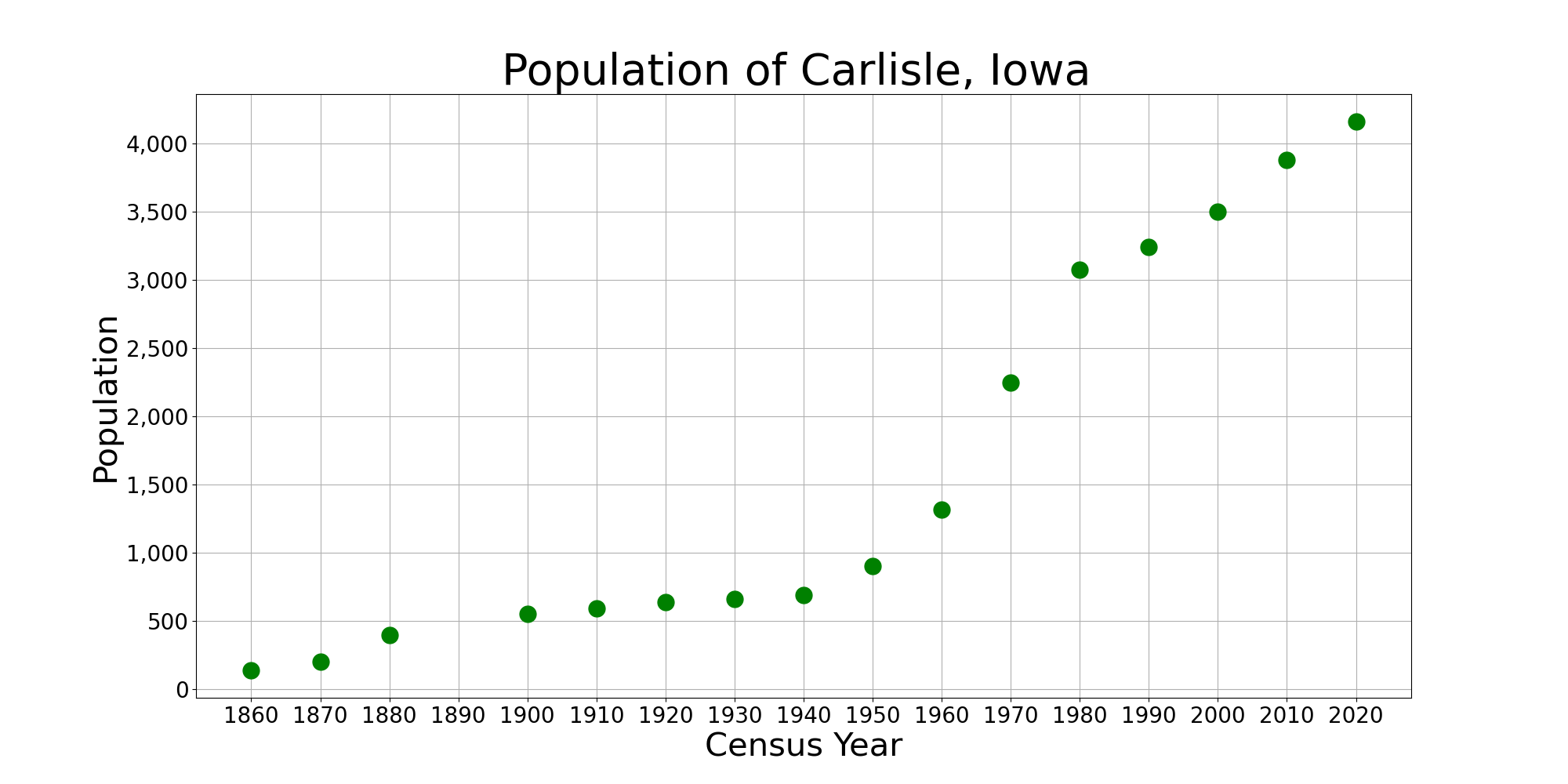
The population of Carlisle, Iowa from US census data

=== 2020 census ===
As of the 2020 census, Carlisle had a population of 4,160, with 1,590 households and 1,139 families residing in the city. The population density was 736.1 inhabitants per square mile (284.2/km^{2}). There were 1,694 housing units at an average density of 299.7 per square mile (115.7/km^{2}).

The median age was 37.1 years. 28.2% of residents were under the age of 18 and 16.3% of residents were 65 years of age or older. 30.3% of residents were under the age of 20; 4.7% were between the ages of 20 and 24; 25.0% were from 25 to 44; and 23.6% were from 45 to 64. For every 100 females, there were 93.0 males, and for every 100 females age 18 and over there were 91.2 males age 18 and over.

Of the 1,590 households, 37.6% had children under the age of 18 living with them. Of all households, 53.6% were married-couple households, 15.8% were households with a male householder and no spouse or partner present, and 24.6% were households with a female householder and no spouse or partner present. About 24.1% of all households were made up of individuals and 11.4% had someone living alone who was 65 years of age or older. 28.4% of all households were non-families.

There were 1,694 housing units, of which 6.1% were vacant. The homeowner vacancy rate was 1.0% and the rental vacancy rate was 11.0%.

0.0% of residents lived in urban areas, while 100.0% lived in rural areas.

Racial composition as of the 2020 census
Race	Number	Percent
White	3,898	93.7%
Black or African American	34	0.8%
American Indian and Alaska Native	2	0.0%
Asian	22	0.5%
Native Hawaiian and Other Pacific Islander	2	0.0%
Some other race	29	0.7%
Two or more races	173	4.2%
Hispanic or Latino (of any race)	149	3.6%

=== 2010 census ===
As of the census of 2010, there were 3,876 people, 1,474 households, and 1,056 families lived in the city. The population density was 697.1 inhabitants per square mile (269.2/km^{2}). There were 1,524 housing units at an average density of 274.1 per square mile (105.8/km^{2}). The racial makeup of the city was 96.7% White, 0.4% African American, 0.1% Native American, 0.5% Asian, 0.5% from other races, and 1.9% from two or more races. Hispanic or Latino of any race were 2.0% of the population.

There were 1,474 households, of which 39.6% had children under the age of 18 living with them, 53.7% were married couples living together, 12.4% had a female householder with no husband present, 5.5% had a male householder with no wife present, and 28.4% were non-families. 23.7% of all households were made up of individuals, and 9.3% had someone living alone who was 65 years of age or older. The average household size was 2.57 and the average family size was 3.05.

The median age in the city was 37.5 years. 28.9% of residents were under the age of 18; 6.7% were between the ages of 18 and 24; 25.5% were from 25 to 44; 24.2% were from 45 to 64; and 14.7% were 65 years of age or older. The gender makeup of the city was 48.2% male and 51.8% female.

=== 2000 census ===
As of the census of 2000, there were 3,497 people, 1,338 households, and 974 families living in the city. The population density was 807.8 inhabitants per square mile (311.9/km^{2}). There were 1,379 housing units at an average density of 318.6 per square mile (123.0/km^{2}). The racial makeup of the city was 98.06% White, 0.17% African American, 0.34% Native American, 0.20% Asian, 0.06% Pacific Islander, 0.49% from other races, and 0.69% from two or more races. Hispanic or Latino of any race were 1.14% of the population.

There were 1,338 households, out of which 38.0% had children under the age of 18 living with them, 59.0% were married couples living together, 11.1% had a female householder with no husband present, and 27.2% were non-families. 23.1% of all households were made up of individuals, and 9.7% had someone living alone who was 65 years of age or older. The average household size was 2.54 and the average family size was 3.01.

27.6% are under the age of 18, 8.0% from 18 to 24, 28.3% from 25 to 44, 22.5% from 45 to 64, and 13.6% who were 65 years of age or older. The median age was 35 years. For every 100 females, there were 89.1 males. For every 100 females age 18 and over, there were 84.5 males.

The median income for a household in the city was $47,528, and the median income for a family was $53,924. Males had a median income of $39,286 versus $26,162 for females. The per capita income for the city was $19,467. About 2.8% of families and 3.3% of the population were below the poverty line, including 2.5% of those under age 18 and 9.4% of those age 65 or over.

== Education ==
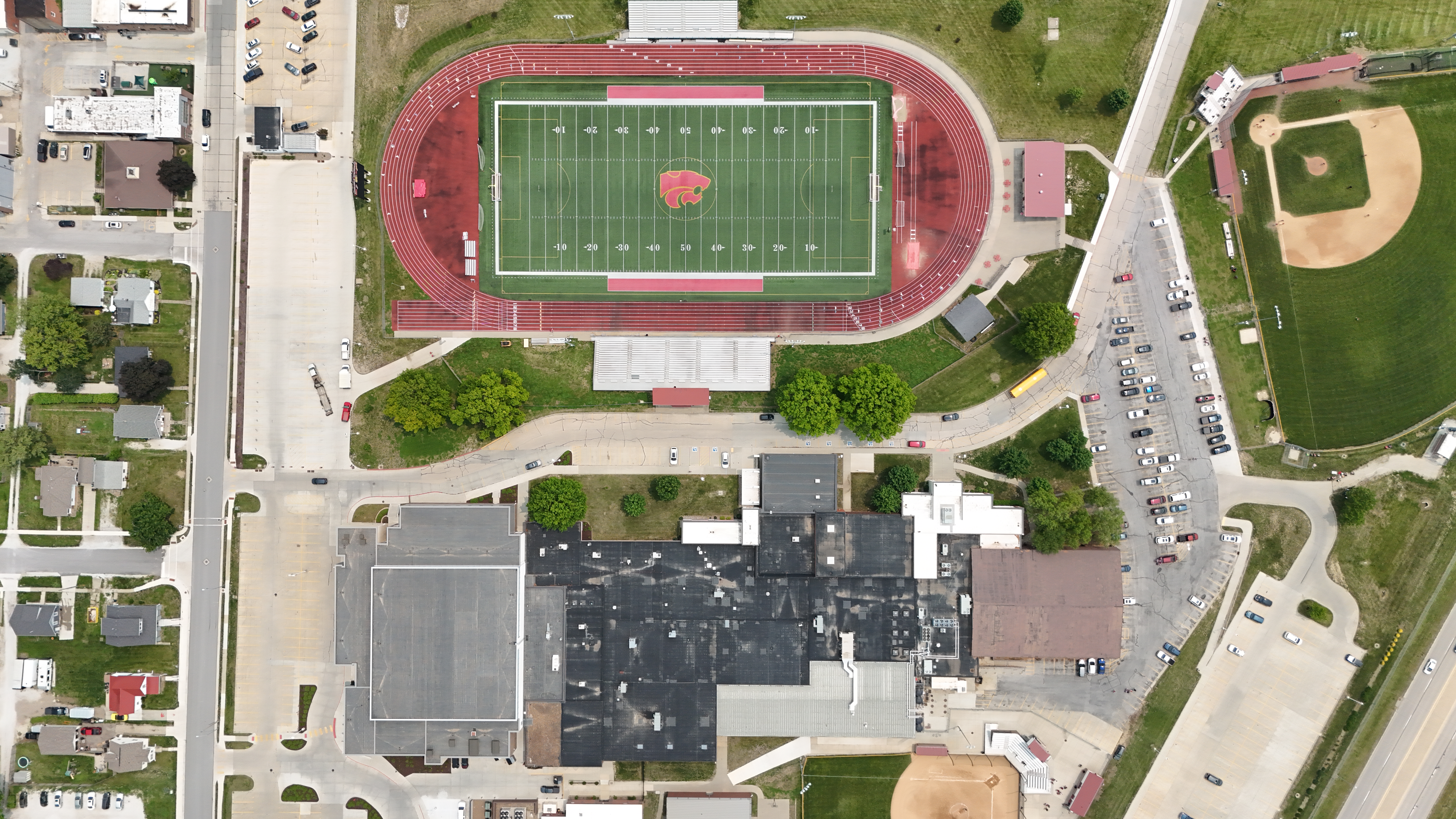
Carlisle high school (lower center) and athletic fields

Carlisle Community School District operates public schools in Carlisle.

The district maintains an upper elementary campus in Hartford and a high school/elementary school campus in Carlisle. A middle school campus was developed with a major residential and commercial development along Scotch Ridge Road.

== Sources ==
- Martin, W. C. (1908). History of Warren County, Iowa: From Its Earliest Settlement to 1908. S.J. Clarke Publishing Company. (History of Warren County, Iowa at the Internet Archive)
- Union Historical Company (1880). The History of Polk County, Iowa. Des Moines: Birdsall, Williams, & Co. (History of Polk County, Iowa at the Internet Archive)
- Union Historical Company (1879). The History of Warren County, Iowa. Des Moines: Birdsall, Williams, & Co. (History of Warren County, Iowa at the Internet Archive)
- Andrews, Lorenzo F. (1908). Pioneers of Polk County, Iowa and Reminiscences of Early Days. Des Moines: Baker-Trisler Co. (Pioneers of Polk County, Iowa and Reminiscences of Early Days at the Internet Archive)
