= Virginia Township, Warren County, Iowa =

Township in Warren County, Iowa, U.S.

Coordinates: 41.206°N 93.731°W

Virginia is a township in Warren County, Iowa, USA.

== History ==
Many of the early settlers of Virginia Township hailed from Virginia, hence the name.
