= White Breast Township, Warren County, Iowa =

Township in Warren County, Iowa

Coordinates: 41.204°N 93.385°W

White Breast Township is a township in Warren County, Iowa, USA.

== History ==
White Breast Township was organized in 1851.
