= Otter Township, Warren County, Iowa =

Township in Warren County, Iowa, U.S.

Coordinates: 41.292°N 93.500°W

Otter Township is a township in Warren County, Iowa, USA.

== History ==
This township is named for the otter, which was once hunted within its borders.
