= Bevington, Iowa =

- City
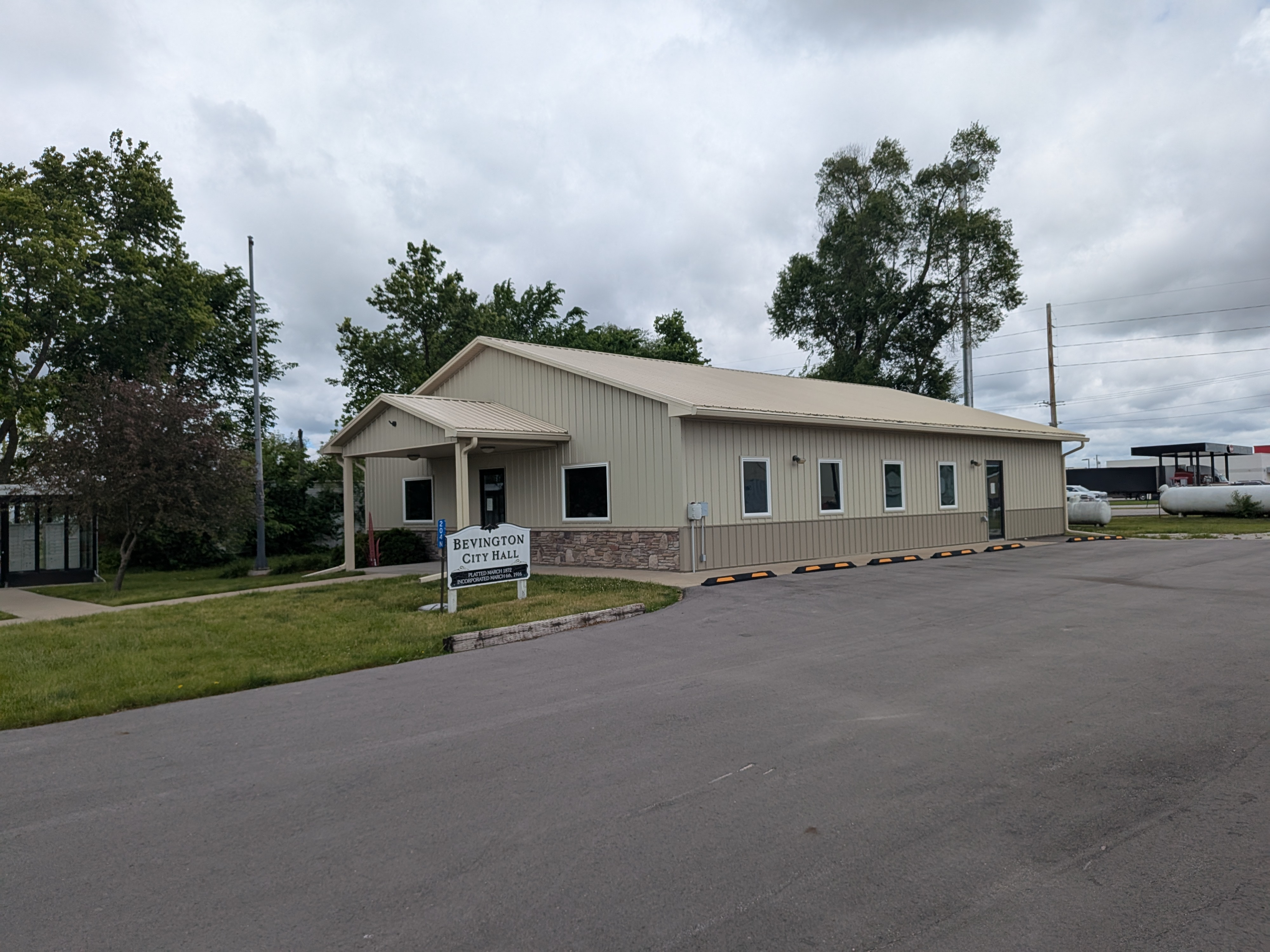
- City Hall

- Location of Bevington, Iowa
- Coordinates: 41°21′34″N 93°47′25″W
- Country: USA
- State: Iowa
- Counties: Madison, Warren

Area
  - Total: 0.46 sq mi (1.19 km^{2})
  - Land: 0.45 sq mi (1.17 km^{2})
  - Water: 0.0077 sq mi (0.02 km^{2})
- Elevation: 840 ft (260 m)

Population (2020)
  - Total: 57
  - Density: 126/sq mi (48.8/km^{2})
- Time zone: UTC-6 (Central (CST))
  - Summer (DST): UTC-5 (CDT)
- ZIP code: 50033
- Area code: 515
- FIPS code: 19-06490
- GNIS feature ID: 2394161

Bevington is a city in Madison and Warren Counties in the U.S. state of Iowa. The population was 57 at the 2020 census. It is part of the Des Moines–West Des Moines Metropolitan Statistical Area.

== History ==
Bevington was laid out in 1872. It was named for C. D. Bevington, a prominent local businessman.

== Geography ==
Bevington is located along the Middle River. The majority of the city is located in Madison County.

According to the United States Census Bureau, the city has a total area of 0.46 square miles (1.19 km^{2}), of which 0.45 square miles (1.17 km^{2}) is land and 0.01 square miles (0.03 km^{2}) is water.

Bevington is located adjacent to Interstate 35 on state highway 92.

== Demographics ==
Historical populations
| Year | Pop. | ±% |
|---|---|---|
| 1920 | 71 | — |
| 1930 | 50 | −29.6% |
| 1940 | 35 | −30.0% |
| 1950 | 48 | +37.1% |
| 1960 | 55 | +14.6% |
| 1970 | 54 | −1.8% |
| 1980 | 60 | +11.1% |
| 1990 | 67 | +11.7% |
| 2000 | 58 | −13.4% |
| 2010 | 63 | +8.6% |
| 2020 | 57 | −9.5% |
Source:"U.S. Census website". United States Census Bureau. and Iowa Data Center; Source: U.S. Decennial Census

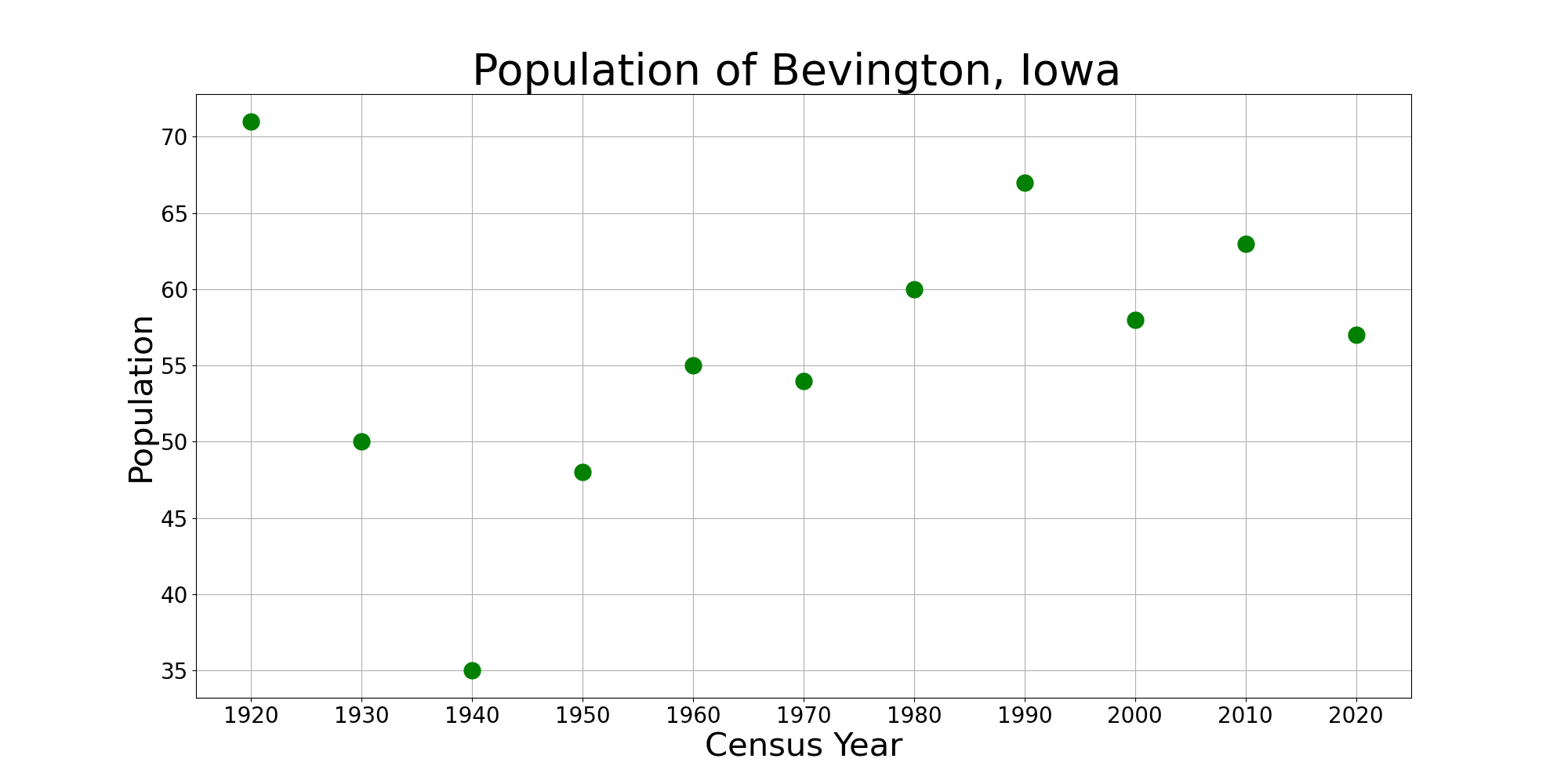
The population of Bevington, Iowa from US census data

=== 2020 census ===
As of the census of 2020, there were 57 people, 22 households, and 15 families residing in the city. The population density was 126.3 inhabitants per square mile (48.8/km^{2}). There were 25 housing units at an average density of 55.4 per square mile (21.4/km^{2}). The racial makeup of the city was 89.5% White, 0.0% Black or African American, 0.0% Native American, 0.0% Asian, 0.0% Pacific Islander, 3.5% from other races and 7.0% from two or more races. Hispanic or Latino persons of any race comprised 1.8% of the population.

Of the 22 households, 50.0% of which had children under the age of 18 living with them, 59.1% were married couples living together, 13.6% were cohabitating couples, 13.6% had a female householder with no spouse or partner present and 13.6% had a male householder with no spouse or partner present. 31.8% of all households were non-families. 18.2% of all households were made up of individuals, 9.1% had someone living alone who was 65 years old or older.

The median age in the city was 40.5 years. 22.8% of the residents were under the age of 20; 12.3% were between the ages of 20 and 24; 19.3% were from 25 and 44; 35.1% were from 45 and 64; and 10.5% were 65 years of age or older. The gender makeup of the city was 45.6% male and 54.4% female.

=== 2010 census ===
At the 2010 census, there were 63 people, 28 households and 18 families living in the city. The population density was 140.0 per square mile (54.1/km^{2}). There were 28 housing units at an average density of 62.2 per square mile (24.0/km^{2}). The racial make-up was 98.4% White and 1.6% Asian. Hispanic or Latino of any race were 1.6% of the population.

There were 28 households, of which 28.6% had children under the age of 18 living with them, 42.9% were married couples living together, 3.6% had a female householder with no husband present, 17.9% had a male householder with no wife present, and 35.7% were non-families. 28.6% of all households were made up of individuals, and 10.7% had someone living alone who was 65 years of age or older. The average household size was 2.25 and the average family size was 2.78.

The median age was 39.5 years. 25.4% of residents were under the age of 18; 3.2% were between the ages of 18 and 24; 25.4% were from 25 to 44; 36.6% were from 45 to 64; and 9.5% were 65 years of age or older. The gender makeup of the city was 58.7% male and 41.3% female.

=== 2000 census ===
At the 2000 census there were 58 people, 24 households and 16 families living in the city. The population density was 215.4 per square mile (83.2/km^{2}). There were 25 housing units at an average density of 92.9 per square mile (35.9/km^{2}). The racial makeup was 96.55% White, and 3.45% from two or more races.

There were 24 households, of which 33.3% had children under the age of 18 living with them, 62.5% were married couples living together, 4.2% had a female householder with no husband present, and 33.3% were non-families. 20.8% of all households were made up of individuals, and 4.2% had someone living alone who was 65 years of age or older. The average household size was 2.42 and the average family size was 2.88.

20.7% of the population were under the age of 18, 12.1% from 18 to 24, 34.5% from 25 to 44, 22.4% from 45 to 64, and 10.3% who were 65 years of age or older. The median age was 37 years. For every 100 females, there were 132.0 males. For every 100 females age 18 and over, there were 109.1 males.

The median household income was $31,875 and the median family income was $35,000. Males had a median income of $28,125 and females $16,250. The per capita income was $16,592. There were no families and 3.9% of the population living below the poverty line, including no under eighteens and none of those over 64.
