= Spring Hill, Iowa =

- City
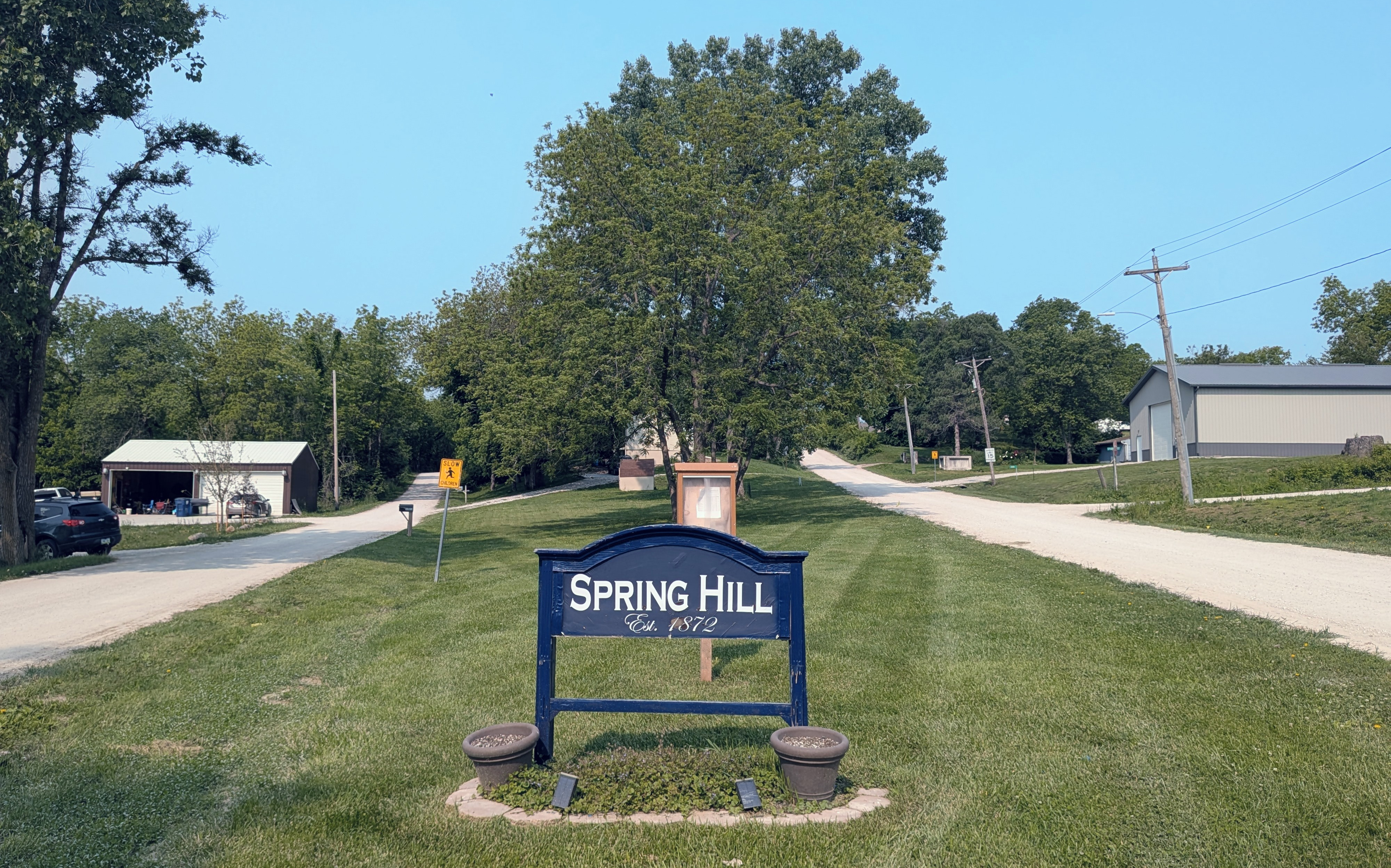
- Spring Hill welcome sign

- Location of Spring Hill, Iowa
- Coordinates: 41°24′44″N 93°39′00″W
- Country: United States
- State: Iowa
- County: Warren

Government
  - Type: Council-Mayor

Area
  - Total: 0.12 sq mi (0.32 km^{2})
  - Land: 0.12 sq mi (0.32 km^{2})
  - Water: 0 sq mi (0.00 km^{2})
- Elevation: 873 ft (266 m)

Population (2020)
  - Total: 68
  - Density: 544.4/sq mi (210.21/km^{2})
- Time zone: UTC-6 (Central (CST))
  - Summer (DST): UTC-5 (CDT)
- ZIP code: 50125
- Area code: 515
- FIPS code: 19-74685
- GNIS feature ID: 2395933

Spring Hill is a city in Warren County, Iowa, United States. The population was 68 at the time of the 2020 census. It is part of the Des Moines–West Des Moines Metropolitan Statistical Area.

== History ==
Spring Hill was laid out in 1872.

== Geography ==
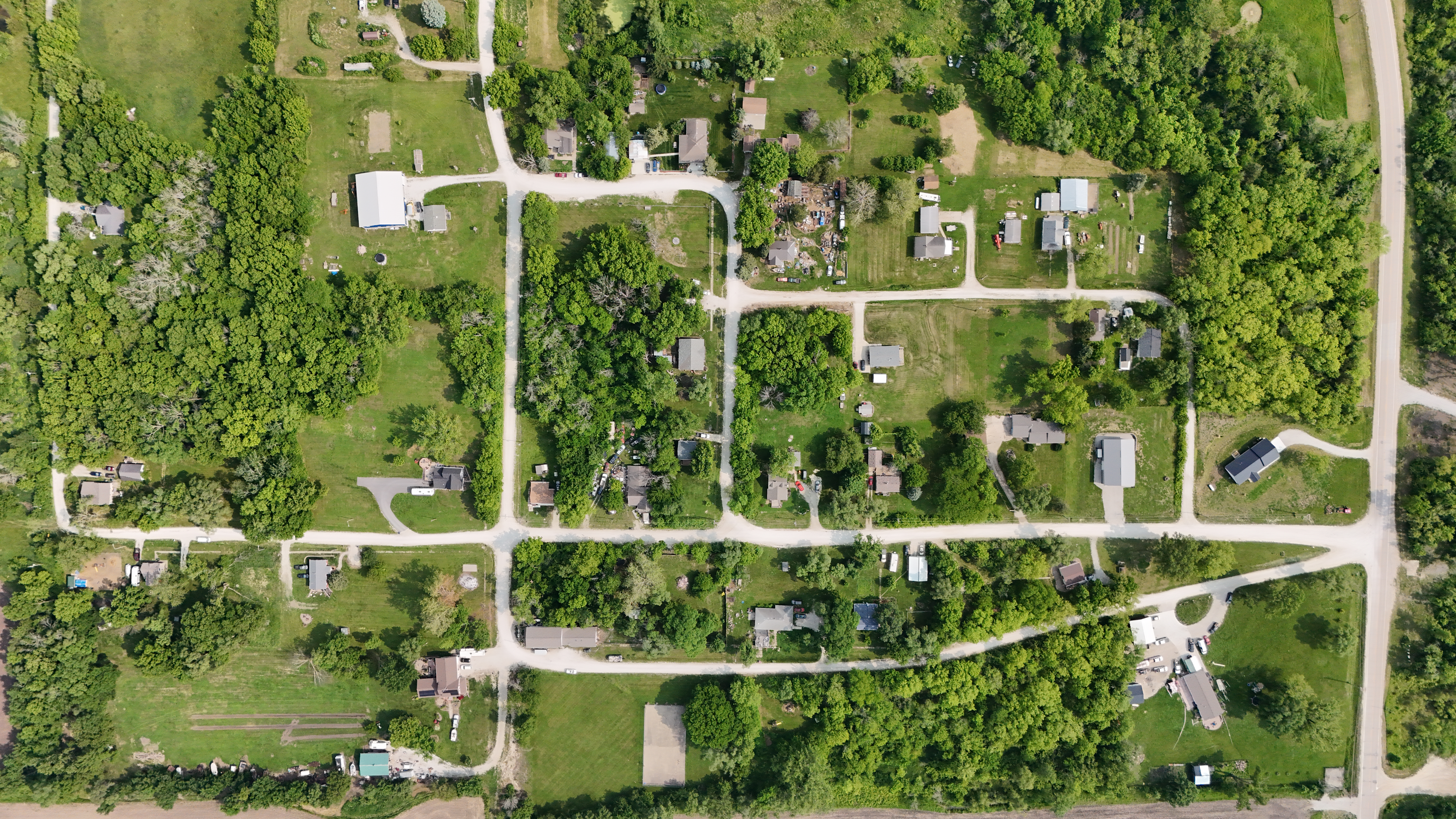
An aerial view of Spring Hill, taken on May 31, 2025

Spring Hill is located along the Middle River.

According to the United States Census Bureau, the city has a total area of 0.12 square miles (0.31 km^{2}), all of it land.

== Demographics ==
Historical populations
Year	Pop.	±%
1880	137	—
1890	104	−24.1%
1900	99	−4.8%
1910	94	−5.1%
1920	489	+420.2%
1930	101	−79.3%
1940	146	+44.6%
1950	86	−41.1%
1960	111	+29.1%
1970	131	+18.0%
1980	95	−27.5%
1990	86	−9.5%
2000	92	+7.0%
2010	63	−31.5%
2020	68	+7.9%
Source:"U.S. Census website". United States Census Bureau. and Iowa Data Center; Source: U.S. Decennial Census

=== 2020 census ===
As of the census of 2020, there were 68 people, 27 households, and 18 families residing in the city. The population density was 546.2 inhabitants per square mile (210.9/km^{2}). There were 32 housing units at an average density of 257.0 per square mile (99.2/km^{2}). The racial makeup of the city was 92.6% White, 0.0% Black or African American, 0.0% Native American, 0.0% Asian, 0.0% Pacific Islander, 0.0% from other races and 7.4% from two or more races. Hispanic or Latino persons of any race comprised 2.9% of the population.

Of the 27 households, 29.6% of which had children under the age of 18 living with them, 40.7% were married couples living together, 14.8% were cohabitating couples, 22.2% had a female householder with no spouse or partner present and 22.2% had a male householder with no spouse or partner present. 33.3% of all households were non-families. 29.6% of all households were made up of individuals, 11.1% had someone living alone who was 65 years old or older.

The median age in the city was 43.5 years. 17.6% of the residents were under the age of 20; 8.8% were between the ages of 20 and 24; 25.0% were from 25 and 44; 33.8% were from 45 and 64; and 14.7% were 65 years of age or older. The gender makeup of the city was 51.5% male and 48.5% female.

=== 2010 census ===
As of the census of 2010, there were 63 people in 28 households, including 15 families, in the city. The population density was 525.0 inhabitants per square mile (202.7/km^{2}). There were 30 housing units at an average density of 250.0 units per square mile (96.5 units/km^{2}). The racial makup of the city was 98.4% White and 1.6% African American.

Of the 28 households 28.6% had children under the age of 18 living with them, 25.0% were married couples living together, 17.9% had a female householder with no husband present, 10.7% had a male householder with no wife present, and 46.4% were non-families. 32.1% of households were one person and 10.7% were one person aged 65 or older. The average household size was 2.25 and the average family size was 2.93.

The median age was 41.8 years. 19% of residents were under the age of 18; 11.2% were between the ages of 18 and 24; 26.9% were from 25 to 44; 25.4% were from 45 to 64; and 17.5% were 65 or older. The gender makeup of the city was 55.6% male and 44.4% female.

=== 2000 census ===
As of the census of 2000, there were 92 people in 31 households, including 23 families, in the city. The population density was 773.4 inhabitants per square mile (298.6/km^{2}). There were 33 housing units at an average density of 277.4 units per square mile (107.1 units/km^{2}). The racial makup of the city was 98.91% White and 1.09% Asian.

Of the 31 households 48.4% had children under the age of 18 living with them, 58.1% were married couples living together, 16.1% had a female householder with no husband present, and 22.6% were non-families. 19.4% of households were one person and none had someone living alone who was 65 or older. The average household size was 2.97 and the average family size was 3.42.

The age distribution was 34.8% under the age of 18, 6.5% from 18 to 24, 30.4% from 25 to 44, 26.1% from 45 to 64, and 2.2% 65 or older. The median age was 32 years. For every 100 females, there were 84.0 males. For every 100 females age 18 and over, there were 100.0 males.

The median household income was $33,750 and the median family income was $31,875. Males had a median income of $22,500 versus $25,000 for females. The per capita income for the city was $11,671. There were 10.5% of families and 10.7% of the population living below the poverty line, including 14.8% of under eighteens and none of those over 64.
