= Sandyville, Iowa =

- City
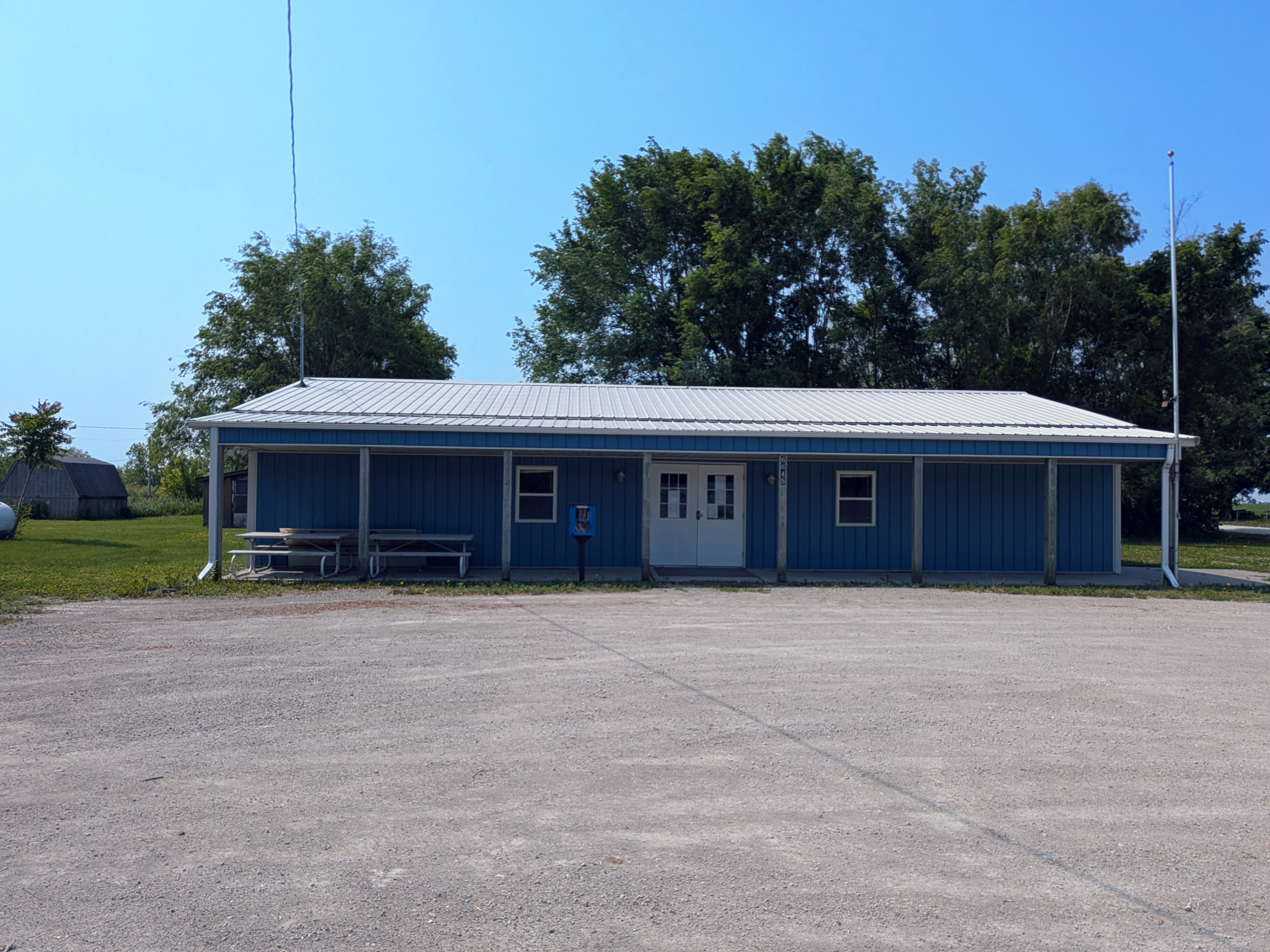
- Sandyville Community Center

- Location of Sandyville, Iowa
- Coordinates: 41°22′15″N 93°23′10″W
- Country: USA
- State: Iowa
- County: Warren

Area
  - Total: 0.49 sq mi (1.28 km^{2})
  - Land: 0.49 sq mi (1.28 km^{2})
  - Water: 0 sq mi (0.00 km^{2})
- Elevation: 938 ft (286 m)

Population (2020)
  - Total: 58
  - Density: 117/sq mi (45.2/km^{2})
- Time zone: UTC-6 (Central (CST))
  - Summer (DST): UTC-5 (CDT)
- ZIP code: 50001
- Area code: 515
- FIPS code: 19-70590
- GNIS feature ID: 2396535

Sandyville is a city in Warren County, Iowa, United States. The population was 58 at the time of the 2020 census. It is part of the Des Moines–West Des Moines Metropolitan Statistical Area.

== History ==
Sandyville was laid out in 1851. It was named for its founder, J. Moorman Sandy.

== Geography ==
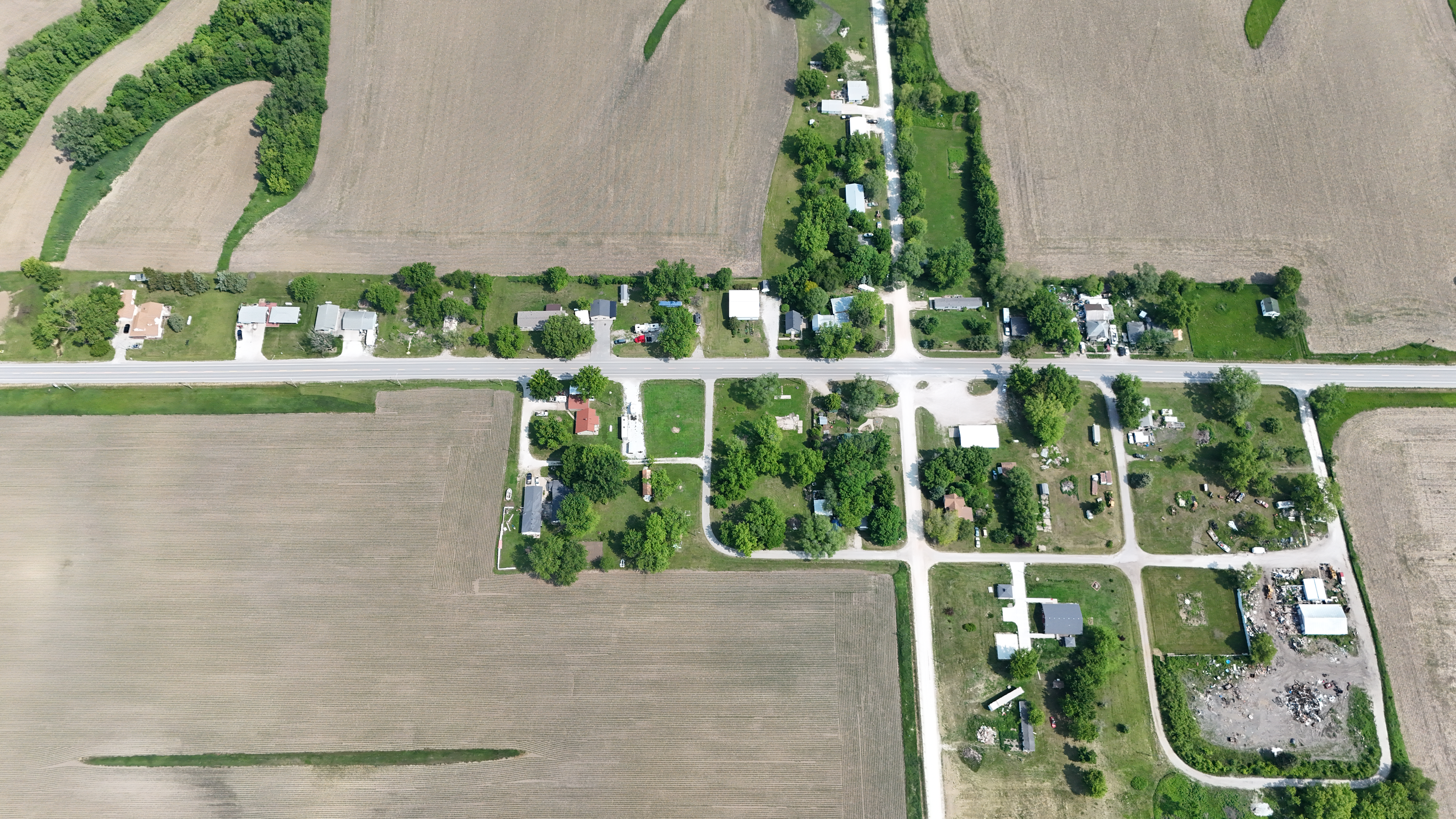
Aerial view of Sandyville, taken on May 30, 2025

According to the United States Census Bureau, the city has a total area of 0.51 square miles (1.32 km^{2}), all of it land.

== Demographics ==
Historical populations
Year	Pop.	±%
1910	120	—
1920	94	−21.7%
1930	92	−2.1%
1940	93	+1.1%
1950	92	−1.1%
1960	115	+25.0%
1970	89	−22.6%
1980	86	−3.4%
1990	59	−31.4%
2000	61	+3.4%
2010	51	−16.4%
2020	58	+13.7%
Source:"U.S. Census website". United States Census Bureau. and Iowa Data Center; Source: U.S. Decennial Census

=== 2020 census ===
As of the census of 2020, there were 58 people, 24 households, and 18 families residing in the city. The population density was 117.6 inhabitants per square mile (45.4/km^{2}). There were 24 housing units at an average density of 48.7 per square mile (18.8/km^{2}). The racial makeup of the city was 93.1% White, 0.0% Black or African American, 0.0% Native American, 1.7% Asian, 0.0% Pacific Islander, 0.0% from other races and 5.2% from two or more races. Hispanic or Latino persons of any race comprised 1.7% of the population.

Of the 24 households, 45.8% of which had children under the age of 18 living with them, 45.8% were married couples living together, 20.8% were cohabitating couples, 12.5% had a female householder with no spouse or partner present and 20.8% had a male householder with no spouse or partner present. 25.0% of all households were non-families. 12.5% of all households were made up of individuals, 4.2% had someone living alone who was 65 years old or older.

The median age in the city was 37.3 years. 25.9% of the residents were under the age of 20; 8.6% were between the ages of 20 and 24; 25.9% were from 25 and 44; 29.3% were from 45 and 64; and 10.3% were 65 years of age or older. The gender makeup of the city was 55.2% male and 44.8% female.

=== 2010 census ===
As of the census of 2010, there were 51 people, 23 households, and 16 families living in the city. The population density was 100.0 inhabitants per square mile (38.6/km^{2}). There were 28 housing units at an average density of 54.9 per square mile (21.2/km^{2}). The racial makeup of the city was 98.0% White and 2.0% African American.

There were 23 households, of which 17.4% had children under the age of 18 living with them, 60.9% were married couples living together, 8.7% had a male householder with no wife present, and 30.4% were non-families. 26.1% of all households were made up of individuals, and 13% had someone living alone who was 65 years of age or older. The average household size was 2.22 and the average family size was 2.63.

The median age in the city was 47.4 years. 11.8% of residents were under the age of 18; 9.8% were between the ages of 18 and 24; 21.6% were from 25 to 44; 39.1% were from 45 to 64; and 17.6% were 65 years of age or older. The gender makeup of the city was 47.1% male and 52.9% female.

=== 2000 census ===
As of the census of 2000, there were 61 people, 27 households, and 18 families living in the city. The population density was 119.6 inhabitants per square mile (46.2/km^{2}). There were 28 housing units at an average density of 54.9 per square mile (21.2/km^{2}). The racial makeup of the city was 95.08% White, and 4.92% from two or more races. Hispanic or Latino of any race were 4.92% of the population.

There were 27 households, out of which 25.9% had children under the age of 18 living with them, 55.6% were married couples living together, 11.1% had a female householder with no husband present, and 33.3% were non-families. 33.3% of all households were made up of individuals, and 11.1% had someone living alone who was 65 years of age or older. The average household size was 2.26 and the average family size was 2.89.

In the city, the population was spread out, with 16.4% under the age of 18, 16.4% from 18 to 24, 27.9% from 25 to 44, 34.4% from 45 to 64, and 4.9% who were 65 years of age or older. The median age was 40 years. For every 100 females, there were 134.6 males. For every 100 females age 18 and over, there were 155.0 males.

The median income for a household in the city was $31,667, and the median income for a family was $34,375. Males had a median income of $27,500 versus $13,750 for females. The per capita income for the city was $20,028. None of the population and none of the families were below the poverty line.
