= Ackworth, Iowa =

- City
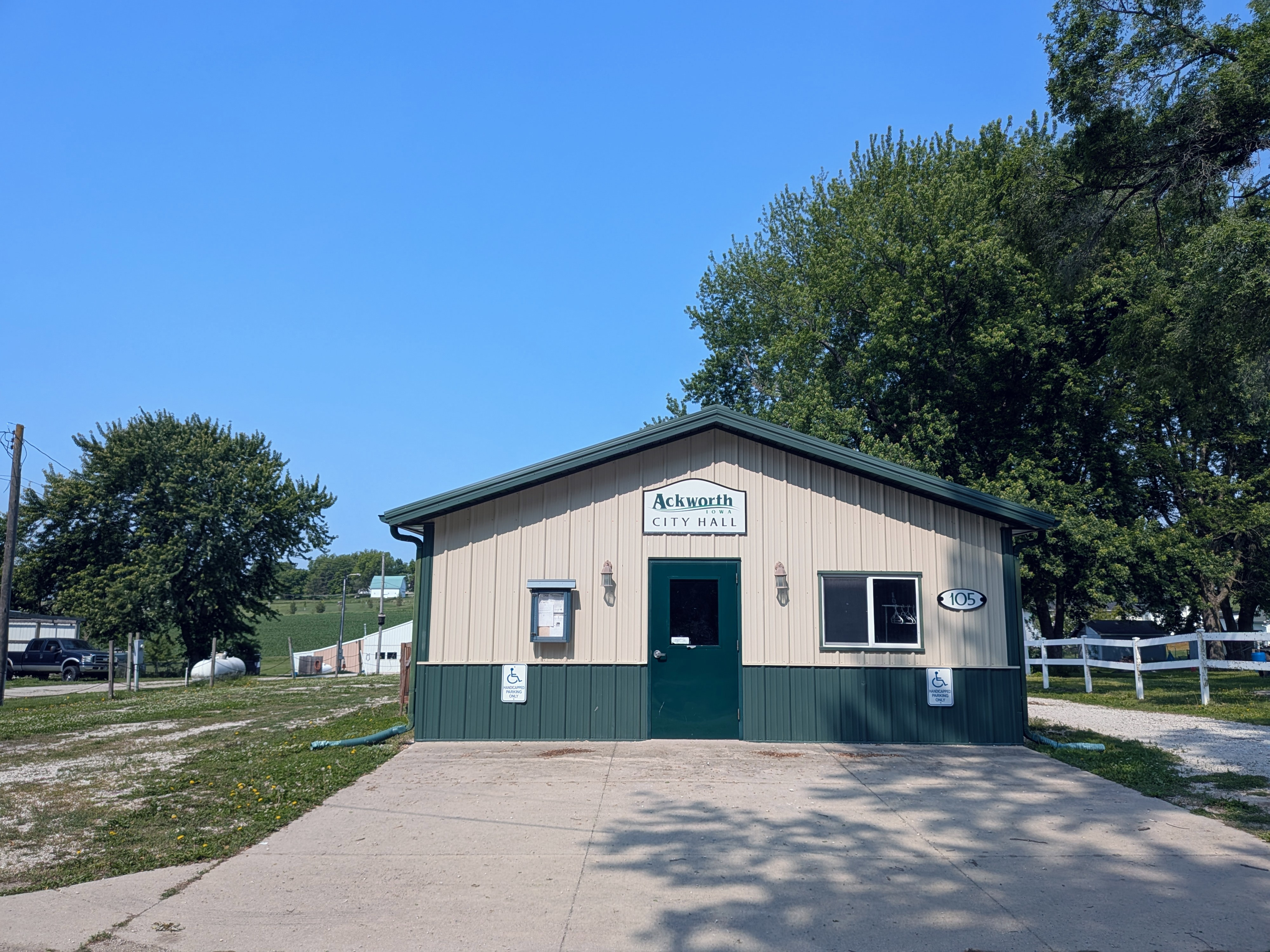
- Ackworth City Hall

- Coordinates: 41°21′51″N 93°28′20″W
- Country: United States
- State: Iowa
- County: Warren

Area
  - Total: 0.55 sq mi (1.43 km^{2})
  - Land: 0.55 sq mi (1.43 km^{2})
  - Water: 0 sq mi (0.00 km^{2})
- Elevation: 863 ft (263 m)

Population (2020)
  - Total: 115
  - Density: 209/sq mi (80.7/km^{2})
- Time zone: UTC-6 (CST)
  - Summer (DST): UTC-5 (CDT)
- ZIP code: 50001
- Area code: 515
- FIPS code: 19-00235
- GNIS feature ID: 2393878

Ackworth is a city in Warren County, Iowa, United States. The population was 115 at the 2020 census.

== History ==
Ackworth was laid out in 1874. The community most likely was named after the Ackworth School, in England. In 1878, the Chicago, Burlington and Quincy Railroad was extended to the town. Ackworth was incorporated in 1881.

== Geography ==
According to the United States Census Bureau, the city has a total area of 0.29 square miles (0.75 km^{2}), all of it land.

== Demographics ==
Historical population
| Year | Pop. | ±% |
|---|---|---|
| 1900 | 134 | — |
| 1910 | 119 | −11.2% |
| 1920 | 95 | −20.2% |
| 1930 | 82 | −13.7% |
| 1940 | 67 | −18.3% |
| 1950 | 95 | +41.8% |
| 1960 | 77 | −18.9% |
| 1970 | 111 | +44.2% |
| 1980 | 83 | −25.2% |
| 1990 | 66 | −20.5% |
| 2000 | 85 | +28.8% |
| 2010 | 83 | −2.4% |
| 2020 | 115 | +38.6% |
Total Population for Iowa's Incorporated Places: 1850-2000; Source: U.S. Decennial Census

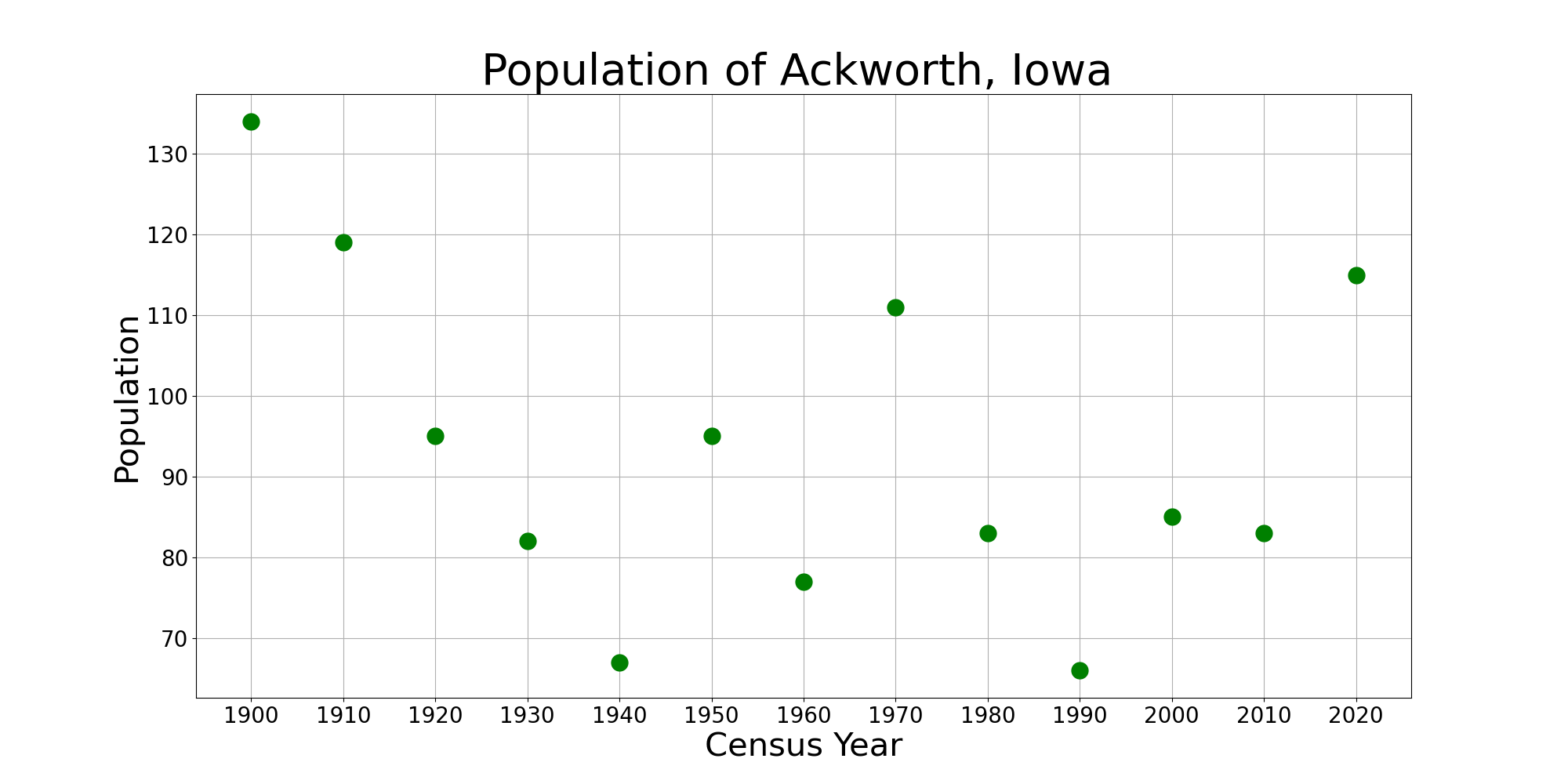
The population of Ackworth, Iowa from US census data

Ackworth is part of the Des Moines–West Des Moines Metropolitan Statistical Area.

=== 2020 census ===
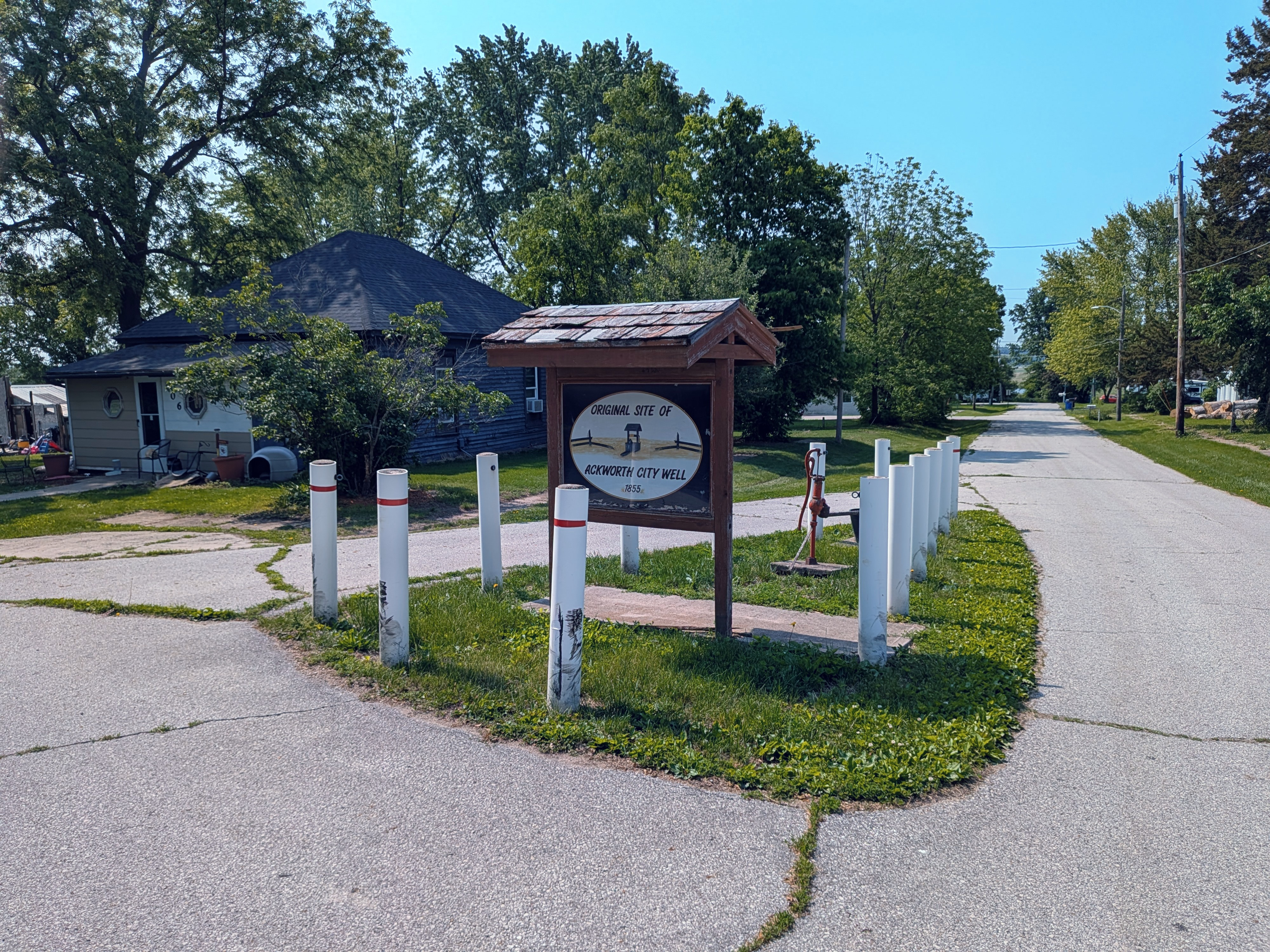
Site of the original water well in Ackworth

As of the census of 2020, there were 115 people, 43 households, and 39 families residing in the city. The population density was 209.0 inhabitants per square mile (80.7/km^{2}). There were 45 housing units at an average density of 81.8 per square mile (31.6/km^{2}). The racial makeup of the city was 95.7% White, 0.0% Black or African American, 0.0% Native American, 0.0% Asian, 0.0% Pacific Islander, 2.6% from other races and 1.7% from two or more races. Hispanic or Latino persons of any race comprised 2.6% of the population.

Of the 43 households, 44.2% of which had children under the age of 18 living with them, 72.1% were married couples living together, 4.7% were cohabitating couples, 7.0% had a female householder with no spouse or partner present and 16.3% had a male householder with no spouse or partner present. 9.3% of all households were non-families. 4.7% of all households were made up of individuals, 0.0% had someone living alone who was 65 years old or older.

The median age in the city was 43.5 years. 28.7% of the residents were under the age of 20; 5.2% were between the ages of 20 and 24; 17.4% were from 25 and 44; 30.4% were from 45 and 64; and 18.3% were 65 years of age or older. The gender makeup of the city was 51.3% male and 48.7% female.

=== 2010 census ===
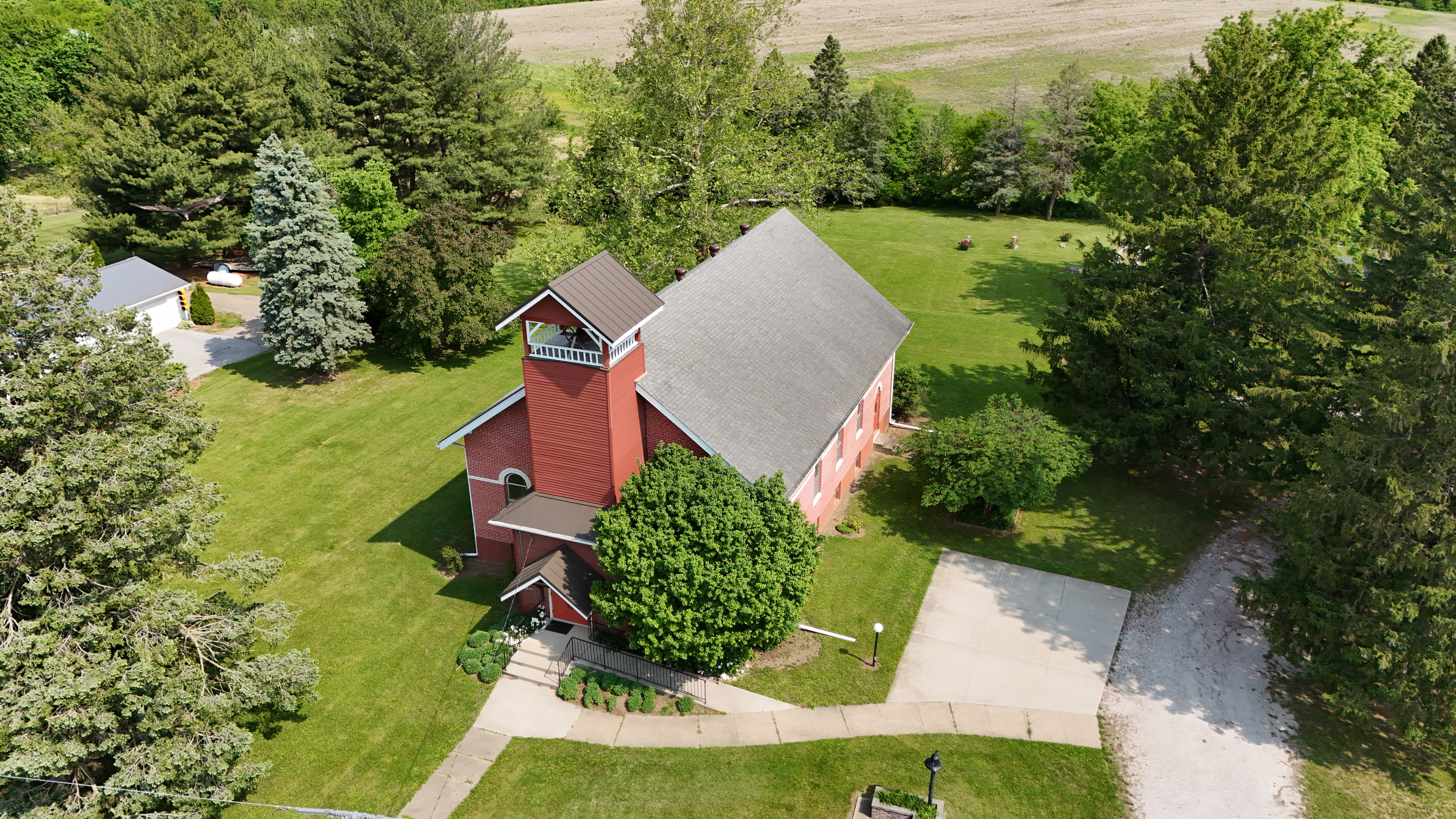
Ackworth Friends Church

As of the census of 2010, there were 83 people, 33 households, and 26 families residing in the city. The population density was 286.2 inhabitants per square mile (110.5/km^{2}). There were 38 housing units at an average density of 131.0 per square mile (50.6/km^{2}). The racial makeup of the city was 100.0% White. Hispanic or Latino of any race were 1.2% of the population.

There were 33 households, of which 30.3% had children under the age of 18 living with them, 69.7% were married couples living together, 9.1% had a female householder with no husband present, and 21.2% were non-families. 21.2% of all households were made up of individuals, and 9.1% had someone living alone who was 65 years of age or older. The average household size was 2.52 and the average family size was 2.92.

The median age in the city was 44.7 years. 21.7% of residents were under the age of 18; 2.3% were between the ages of 18 and 24; 27.6% were from 25 to 44; 28.8% were from 45 to 64; and 19.3% were 65 years of age or older. The gender makeup of the city was 51.8% male and 48.2% female.

=== 2000 census ===
As of the census of 2000, there were 85 people, 31 households, and 27 families residing in the city. The population density was 284.8 inhabitants per square mile (110.0/km^{2}). There were 32 housing units at an average density of 107.2 per square mile (41.4/km^{2}). The racial makeup of the city was 98.82% White, 1.18% from other races. Hispanic or Latino of any race were 1.18% of the population.

There were 31 households, out of which 41.9% had children under the age of 18 living with them, 74.2% were married couples living together, 16.1% had a female householder with no husband present, and 9.7% were non-families. 9.7% of all households were made up of individuals, and 3.2% had someone living alone who was 65 years of age or older. The average household size was 2.74 and the average family size was 2.89.

Age spread: 23.5% under the age of 18, 7.1% from 18 to 24, 32.9% from 25 to 44, 24.7% from 45 to 64, and 11.8% who were 65 years of age or older. The median age was 38 years. For every 100 females, there were 97.7 males. For every 100 females age 18 and over, there were 91.2 males.

The median income for a household in the city was $32,500, and the median income for a family was $38,438. Males had a median income of $30,625 versus $26,875 for females. The per capita income for the city was $17,478. There were 10.3% of families and 6.5% of the population living below the poverty line, including 13.3% of under eighteens and none of those over 64.
