= Allen Township, Warren County, Iowa =

Township in Warren County, Iowa, U.S.

Coordinates: 41.4844°N 93.5137°W

Allen Township is a township in Warren County, Iowa, United States.

== History ==
It is named for Captain James Allen.
