= Warren County, Iowa =

County in Iowa, United States

- County
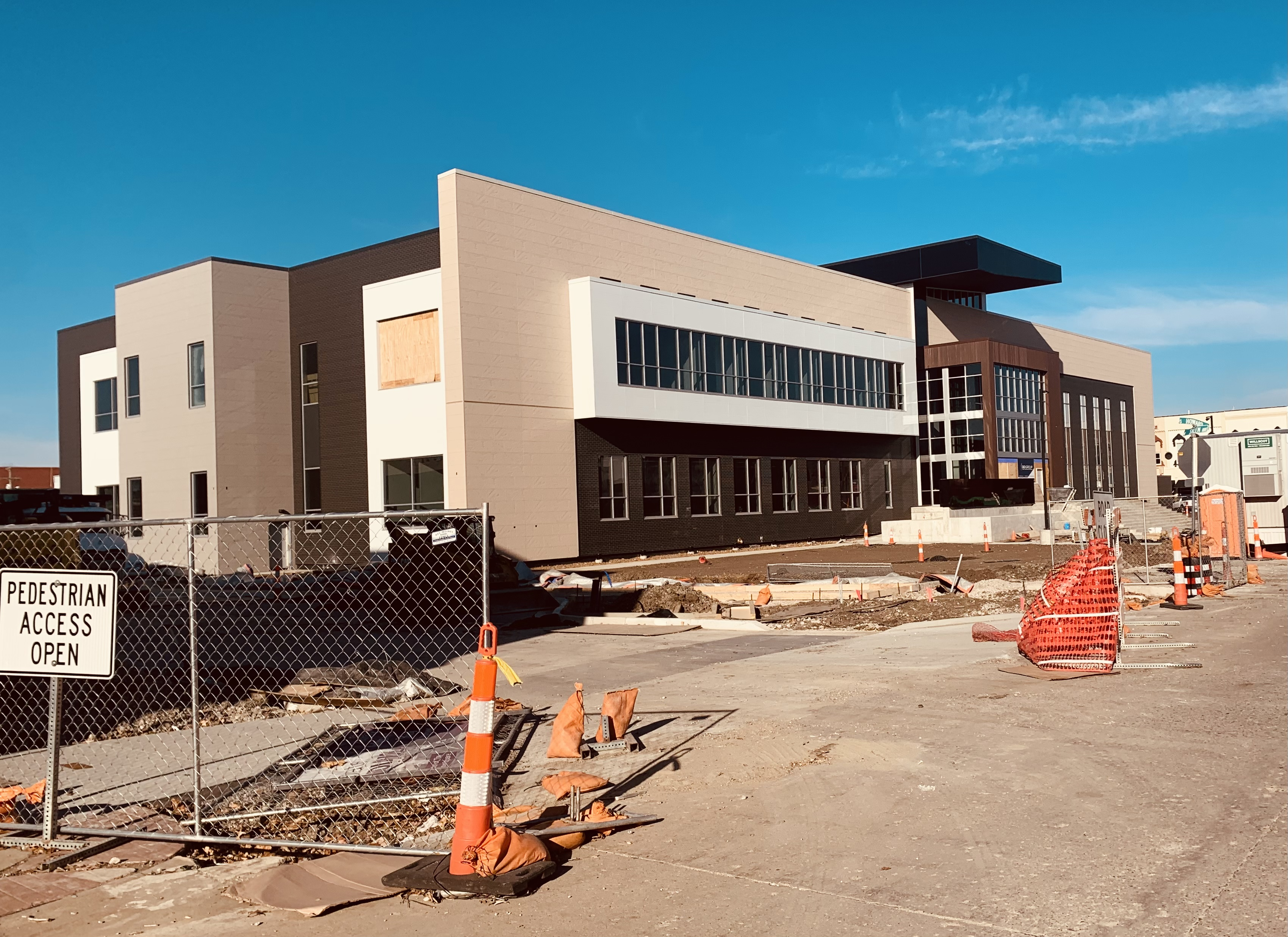
- Warren County courthouse under construction in late 2021

- Location within the U.S. state of Iowa
- Coordinates: 41°20′N 93°34′W
- Country: United States
- State: Iowa
- Founded: 1846
- Named for: Joseph Warren
- Seat: Indianola
- Largest city: Indianola

Area
  - Total: 573 sq mi (1,480 km^{2})
  - Land: 570 sq mi (1,500 km^{2})
  - Water: 3.5 sq mi (9.1 km^{2}) 0.6%

Population (2020)
  - Total: 52,403
  - Estimate (2025): 57,331 ▲
  - Density: 92/sq mi (35/km^{2})
- Time zone: UTC−6 (Central)
  - Summer (DST): UTC−5 (CDT)
- Congressional district: 1st
- Website: www.warrencountyia.gov
- Iowa county number 91

Warren County is a county located in the U.S. state of Iowa. As of the 2020 census, the population was 52,403. The county seat and the largest city is Indianola. Warren County is included in the Des Moines metropolitan area.

== History ==
Warren County was formed in 1846. It was named after General Joseph Warren, a hero in the American Revolutionary War.

Warren County has gone through four courthouses in its history. The third one, built in 1939, was listed on the National Register of Historic Places in 2003. The building later fell into disrepair and was condemned in late 2018 and demolished in 2019. A new courthouse, called the Warren County Justice Center, opened in the summer of 2022.

== Geography ==
According to the United States Census Bureau, the county has a total area of 573 square miles (1,480 km^{2}), of which 570 square miles (1,500 km^{2}) is land and 3.5 square miles (9.1 km^{2}) (0.6%) is water.

=== Major highways ===
- Interstate 35
- U.S. Highway 65
- U.S. Highway 69
- Iowa Highway 5
- Iowa Highway 28
- Iowa Highway 92
- Iowa Highway 316

=== Adjacent counties ===
- Polk County (north)
- Marion County (east)
- Lucas County (southeast)
- Clarke County (southwest)
- Madison County (west)

== Demographics ==
Historical population
Census	Pop.	Note	%±
1850	961		—
1860	10,281		969.8%
1870	17,980		74.9%
1880	19,578		8.9%
1890	18,269		−6.7%
1900	20,376		11.5%
1910	18,194		−10.7%
1920	18,047		−0.8%
1930	17,700		−1.9%
1940	17,695		0.0%
1950	17,758		0.4%
1960	20,829		17.3%
1970	27,432		31.7%
1980	34,878		27.1%
1990	36,033		3.3%
2000	40,671		12.9%
2010	46,225		13.7%
2020	52,403		13.4%
2025 (est.)	57,331	▲	9.4%
U.S. Decennial Census; 1790–1960 1900–1990; 1990–2000 2010–2020

=== 2020 census ===
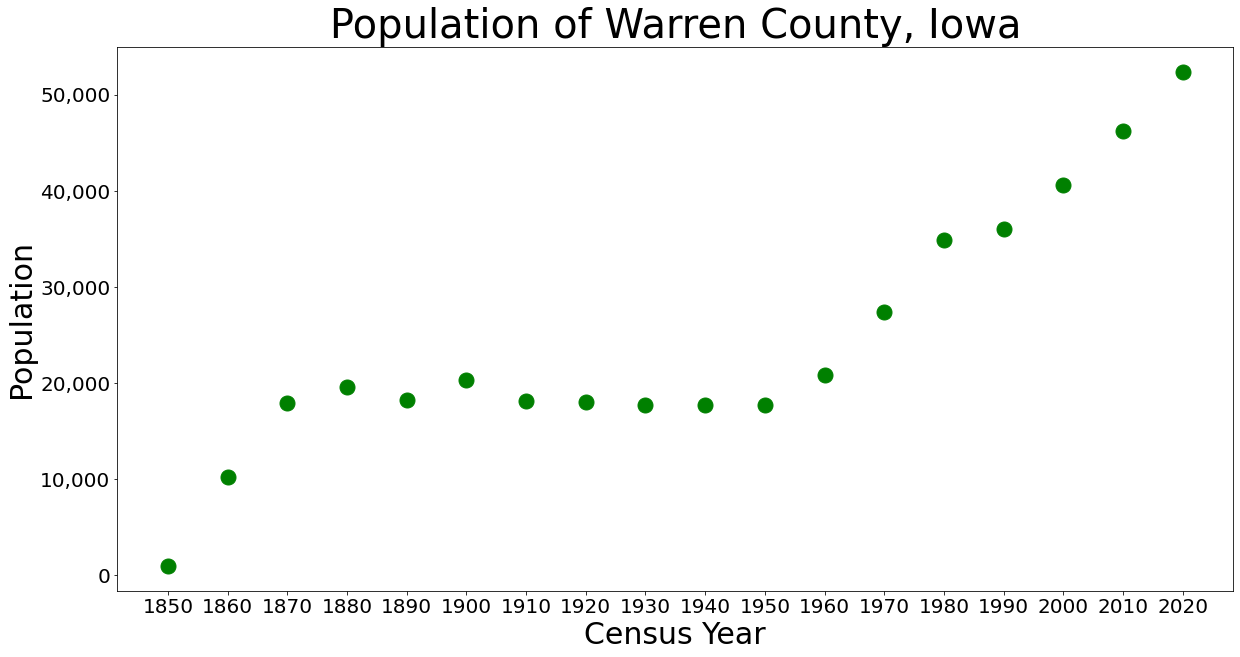
Population of Warren County from the U.S. census data

As of the 2020 census, the county had a population of 52,403, a population density of 91.7/sq mi (35.4/km^{2}), and 95.46% of the population reported being of one race; there were 20,857 housing units, of which 19,616 were occupied, leaving a 6.0% vacancy rate.

Among occupied housing units, 80.2% were owner-occupied and 19.8% were renter-occupied, with homeowner and rental vacancy rates of 1.5% and 10.6%, respectively.

There were 19,616 households in the county, of which 34.2% had children under the age of 18 living in them. Of all households, 59.2% were married-couple households, 14.5% were households with a male householder and no spouse or partner present, and 20.4% were households with a female householder and no spouse or partner present. About 22.5% of all households were made up of individuals and 10.2% had someone living alone who was 65 years of age or older.

The median age was 38.8 years. 25.4% of residents were under the age of 18 and 17.0% of residents were 65 years of age or older. For every 100 females there were 97.0 males, and for every 100 females age 18 and over there were 94.7 males age 18 and over.

The racial makeup of the county was 92.6% White, 0.9% Black or African American, 0.2% American Indian and Alaska Native, 0.7% Asian, <0.1% Native Hawaiian and Pacific Islander, 1.0% from some other race, and 4.5% from two or more races. Hispanic or Latino residents of any race comprised 3.2% of the population.

Warren County Racial Composition
Race	Number	Percent
White (NH)	47,897	91.4%
Black or African American (NH)	452	0.9%
Native American (NH)	80	0.2%
Asian (NH)	380	0.73%
Pacific Islander (NH)	17	0.03%
Other/Mixed (NH)	1,919	3.7%
Hispanic or Latino	1,658	3.2%

52.9% of residents lived in urban areas, while 47.1% lived in rural areas.

=== 2010 census ===
As of the 2010 census recorded a population of 46,225 in the county, with a population density of 80.9/sq mi (31.2/km^{2}). There were 18,371 housing units, of which 17,262 were occupied.

=== 2000 census ===
As of the 2000 census, there were 40,671 people, 14,708 households, and 11,207 families in the county. The population density was 71 inhabitants per square mile (27/km^{2}). There were 15,289 housing units at an average density of 27 per square mile (10/km^{2}). The racial makeup of the county was 98.08% White, 0.27% Black or African American, 0.17% Native American, 0.38% Asian, 0.04% Pacific Islander, 0.29% from other races, and 0.76% from two or more races. 1.08%. were Hispanic or Latino of any race.

Of the 14,708 households 37.80% had children under the age of 18 living with them, 64.50% were married couples living together, 8.80% had a female householder with no husband present, and 23.80% were non-families. 19.90% of households were one person and 8.70% were one person aged 65 or older. The average household size was 2.65 and the average family size was 3.05.

The age distribution was 27.00% under the age of 18, 9.70% from 18 to 24, 28.20% from 25 to 44, 23.20% from 45 to 64, and 11.80% 65 or older. The median age was 36 years. For every 100 females, there were 94.60 males. For every 100 females age 18 and over, there were 91.80 males.

The median household income was $50,349 and the median family income was $56,344. Males had a median income of $36,983 versus $26,768 for females. The per capita income for the county was $20,558. About 3.70% of families and 5.10% of the population were below the poverty line, including 6.40% of those under age 18 and 5.20% of those age 65 or over.

== Communities ==
=== Cities ===
- Ackworth
- Bevington
- Carlisle
- Cumming
- Des Moines (part)
- Hartford
- Indianola
- Lacona
- Martensdale
- Milo
- New Virginia
- Norwalk
- Sandyville
- Spring Hill
- St. Marys
- West Des Moines

=== Unincorporated communities ===
- Beech
- Churchville
- Clarkson
- Conger
- Cool
- Ford
- Liberty Center
- Medora
- Palmyra
- Prole
- Scotch Ridge
- Wick

=== Townships ===
Warren County has sixteen townships:

- Allen
- Belmont
- Greenfield
- Jackson
- Jefferson
- Liberty
- Lincoln
- Linn
- Otter
- Palmyra
- Richland
- Squaw
- Union
- Virginia
- White Breast
- White Oak

=== Population ranking ===
The population ranking of the following table is based on the 2020 census of Warren County.

† county seat

Rank	City/Town/etc.	Municipal type	Population (2020 Census)
1	Des Moines (mostly in Polk County)	City	214,133
2	West Des Moines (partially in Dallas and Polk Counties)	City	68,723
3	† Indianola	City	15,833
4	Norwalk (partially in Polk County)	City	12,799
5	Carlisle (partially in Polk County)	City	4,160
6	Milo	City	778
7	Hartford	City	733
8	New Virginia	City	498
9	Cumming	City	436
10	Martensdale	City	421
11	Lacona	City	345
12	Ackworth	City	115
13	St. Marys	City	108
14	Spring Hill	City	68
15	Sandyville	City	58
16	Bevington (partially in Madison County)	City	57

== Politics ==
United States presidential election results for Warren County, Iowa
Year	Republican		Democratic		Third party(ies)	
Year	No.	%	No.	%	No.	%
1896	2,826	55.27%	2,214	43.30%	73	1.43%
1900	2,966	59.15%	1,876	37.42%	172	3.43%
1904	2,938	66.20%	1,191	26.84%	309	6.96%
1908	2,589	58.59%	1,645	37.23%	185	4.19%
1912	1,386	34.21%	1,396	34.46%	1,269	31.33%
1916	2,182	52.21%	1,910	45.70%	87	2.08%
1920	5,323	70.51%	2,066	27.37%	160	2.12%
1924	4,683	62.08%	1,274	16.89%	1,586	21.03%
1928	5,294	69.74%	2,239	29.50%	58	0.76%
1932	3,725	50.28%	3,542	47.81%	141	1.90%
1936	4,642	52.72%	4,011	45.55%	152	1.73%
1940	5,016	56.21%	3,856	43.21%	51	0.57%
1944	4,266	55.83%	3,319	43.44%	56	0.73%
1948	3,876	50.97%	3,481	45.77%	248	3.26%
1952	5,911	65.55%	3,042	33.74%	64	0.71%
1956	5,430	59.19%	3,729	40.65%	15	0.16%
1960	6,013	59.25%	4,136	40.75%	0	0.00%
1964	3,679	35.54%	6,639	64.14%	33	0.32%
1968	5,619	50.30%	4,613	41.29%	939	8.41%
1972	7,332	57.26%	5,143	40.17%	329	2.57%
1976	6,099	43.23%	7,653	54.25%	356	2.52%
1980	7,360	47.43%	6,610	42.59%	1,549	9.98%
1984	8,277	49.95%	8,171	49.31%	122	0.74%
1988	6,424	39.82%	9,627	59.68%	80	0.50%
1992	7,242	37.80%	8,612	44.95%	3,303	17.24%
1996	6,905	39.52%	9,120	52.20%	1,447	8.28%
2000	9,621	48.95%	9,521	48.45%	511	2.60%
2004	12,160	52.75%	10,730	46.54%	163	0.71%
2008	12,144	48.79%	12,299	49.42%	446	1.79%
2012	13,052	50.06%	12,551	48.14%	469	1.80%
2016	14,814	54.26%	10,411	38.14%	2,075	7.60%
2020	17,782	57.29%	12,574	40.51%	683	2.20%
2024	19,486	59.40%	12,712	38.75%	606	1.85%

== See also ==
- National Register of Historic Places listings in Warren County, Iowa
