= List of covered bridges in Iowa =

Below is a list of covered bridges in Iowa. There are nine authentic covered bridges in the U.S. state of Iowa, though two halves of one bridge reside in different locations. Six of them are historic. A covered bridge is considered authentic not due to its age, but by its construction. An authentic bridge is constructed using trusses rather than other methods such as stringers, a popular choice for non-authentic covered bridges.

== Bridges ==
Name	Image	County	Location	Built	Length	Crosses	Ownership	Truss	Notes
Cedar Covered Bridge	Cedar Covered Bridge	Madison	Winterset; 41°21′54″N 93°59′25″W	2019	76 feet (23 m)	Cedar Creek		Town and queen	Also called Casper Covered Bridge; replaces bridge built in 1883 and rebuilt in 2004; first two bridges were destroyed by arson
Cutler–Donahoe Bridge	Cutler–Donahoe Bridge	Madison	Winterset; 41°19′52″N 94°0′31″W	1871, 1970	79 feet (24 m)	Ditch	City of Winterset	Town	
Hammond Bridge	Hammond Bridge	Marion	Hamilton; 41°10′39″N 93°0′50″W	1894	80 feet (24 m)	North Cedar Creek	County of Marion	Howe	
Hogback Covered Bridge	Hogback Covered Bridge	Madison	Winterset; 41°23′9″N 94°3′0″W	1884	106 feet (32 m)	North River	County of Madison	Town	
Holliwell Covered Bridge	Holliwell Covered Bridge	Madison	Winterset; 41°19′21″N 93°57′33″W	1880	113 feet (34 m)	Middle River	County of Madison	Town	
Imes Covered Bridge	Imes Covered Bridge	Madison	St. Charles; 41°17′18″N 93°47′56″W	1870, 1887, 1977	81 feet (25 m)	Brook	County of Madison	Town	Also called King Bridge
Marysville Covered Bridge		Marion	Knoxville; 41°18′59″N 93°7′33″W	1870, moved 1970	41 feet (12 m)	Ravine		Town	Split from Wilcox Game Preserve Bridge in 1970
Owens Covered Bridge		Polk	Allen; 41°32′25″N 93°33′35″W	1866	100 feet (30 m)	Yeader Creek		Howe	
Roseman Covered Bridge	Roseman Covered Bridge	Madison	Winterset; 41°17′31″N 94°9′5″W	1883	107 feet (33 m)	Middle River	County of Madison	Town	Also called Oak Grove Bridge
Wilcox Game Preserve Covered Bridge		Marion	Liberty; 41°14′9″N 92°57′6″W	1870, moved 1970	40 feet (12 m)	Ravine		Town	Split from Marysville Bridge in 1970

== See also ==
- List of bridges on the National Register of Historic Places in Iowa
- World Guide to Covered Bridges
- List of covered bridges in Madison County, Iowa
