= List of covered bridges in Madison County, Iowa =

Below is a list of covered bridges in Madison County, Iowa. There are only six extant bridges in Madison County.

- Cedar Covered Bridge
- Cutler–Donahoe Bridge
- Hogback Covered Bridge
- Holliwell Covered Bridge
- Imes Bridge
- Roseman Covered Bridge

== Gallery ==
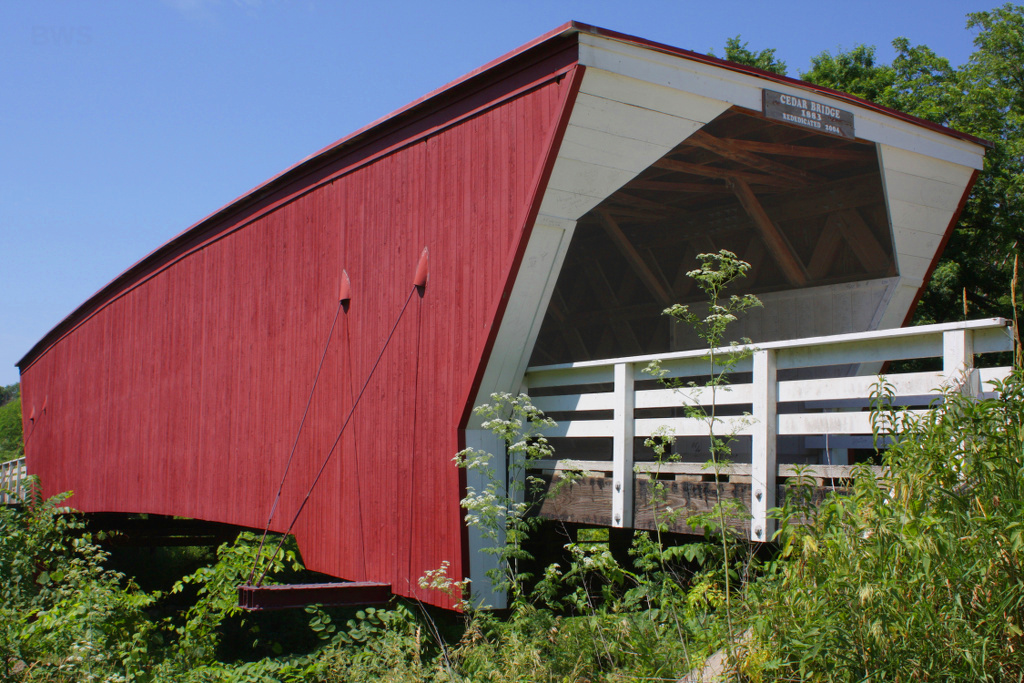
Cedar

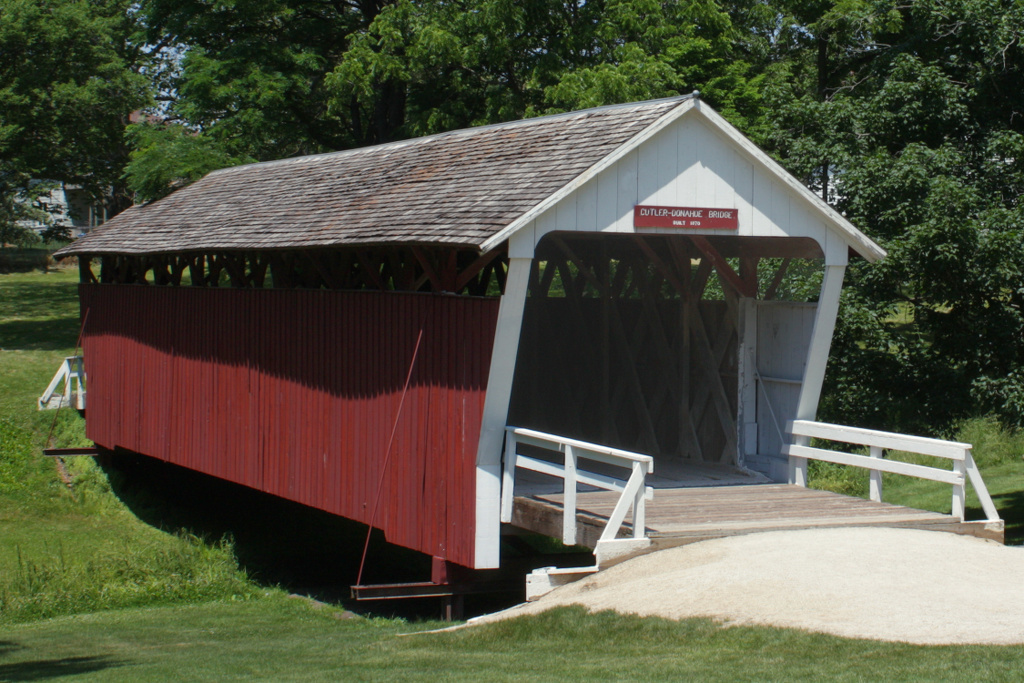
Cutler–Donahoe

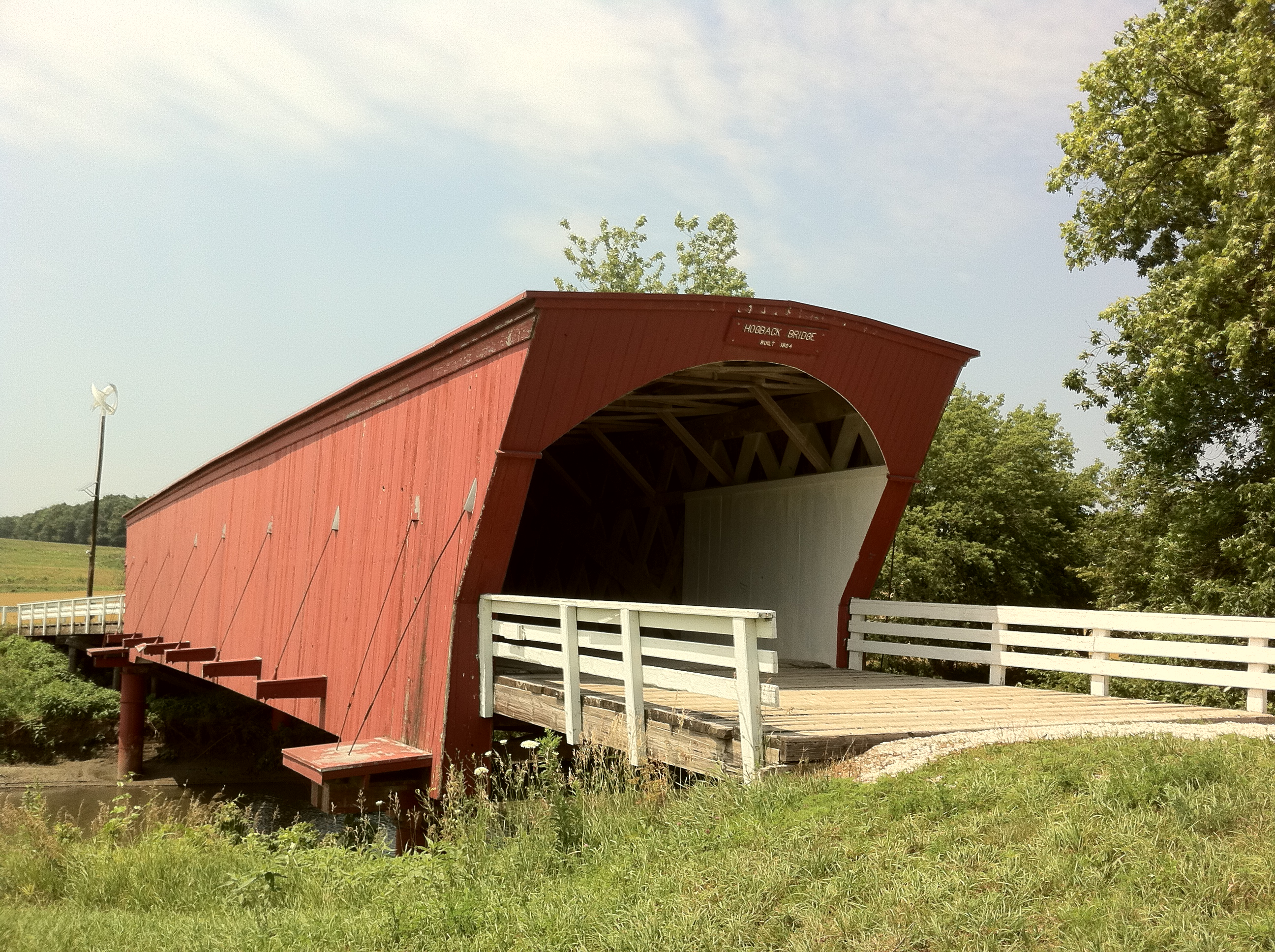
Hogback

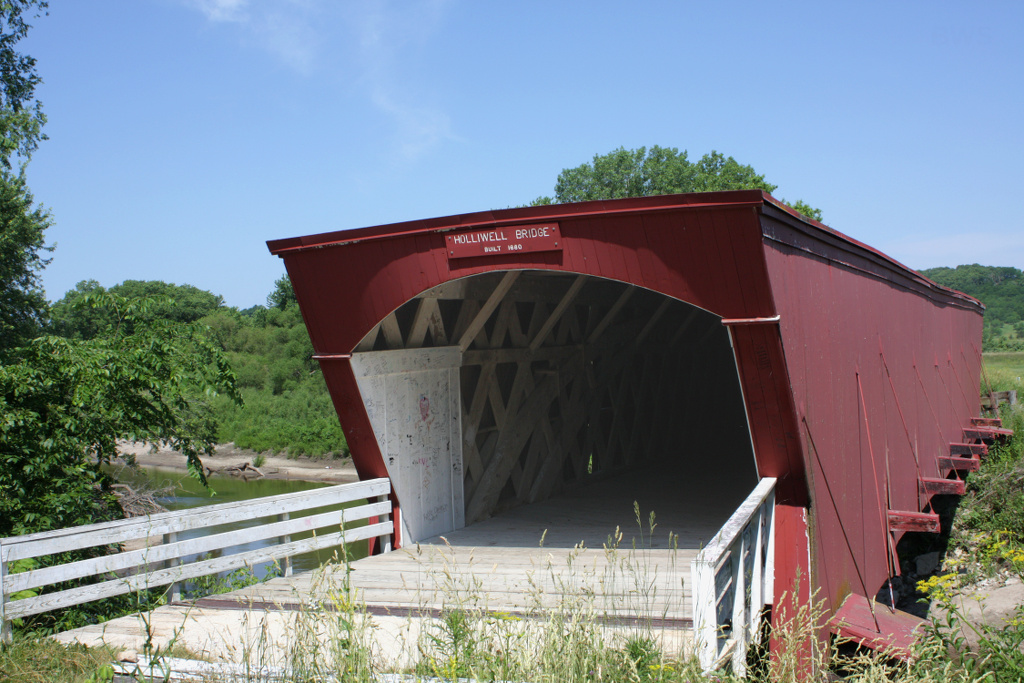
Holliwell

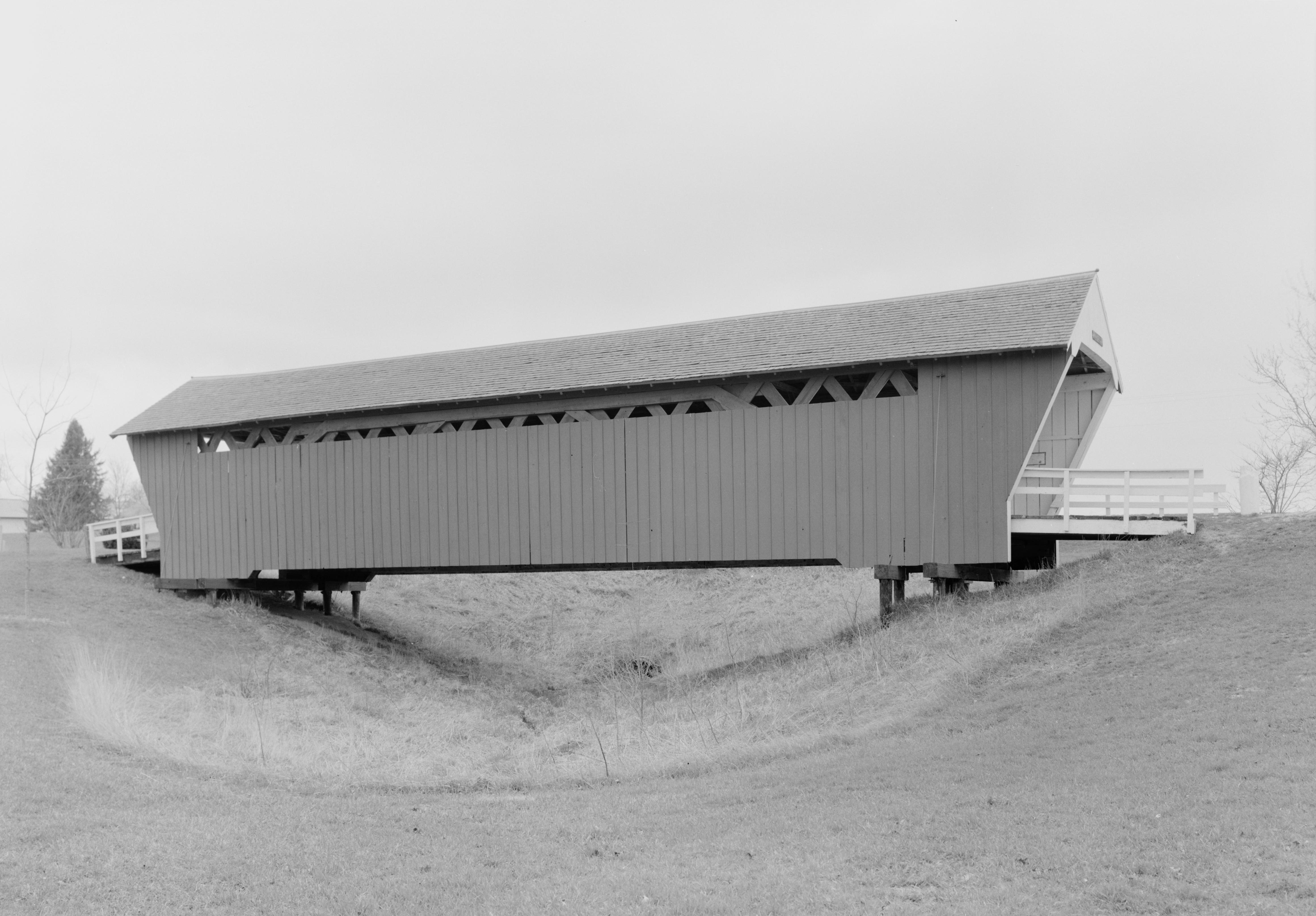
Imes

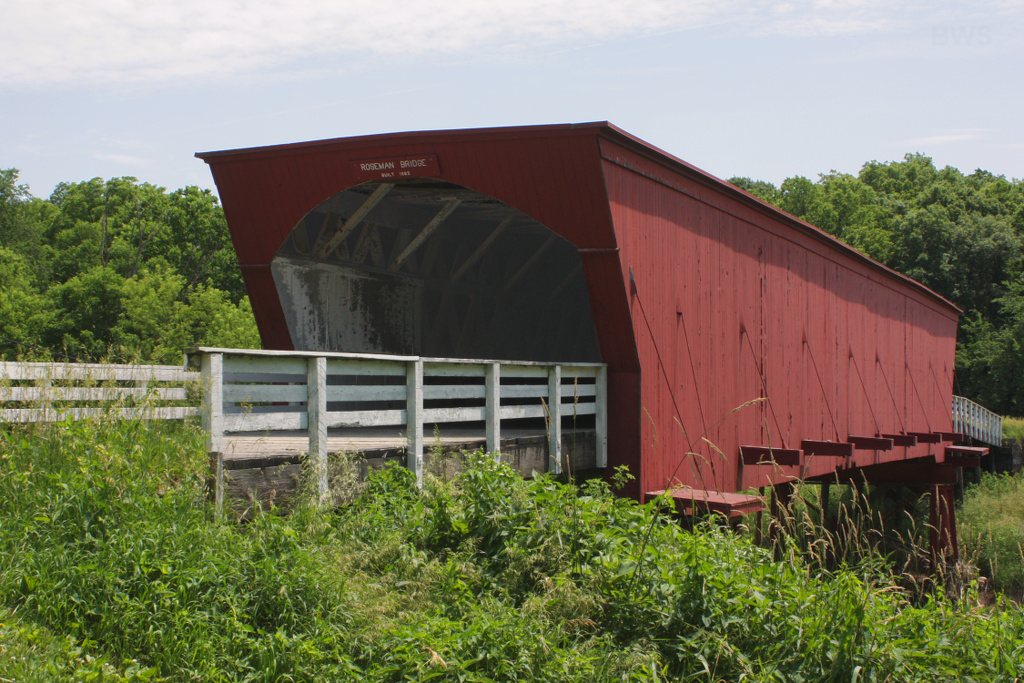
Roseman

== See also ==
- List of bridges documented by the Historic American Engineering Record in Iowa
- List of covered bridges in Iowa
- The Bridges of Madison County 1992 novel, adapted as a 1995 film and a 2014 stage musical
