= Winterset =

Winterset may refer to:

- Winterset (play), a play by Maxwell Anderson
  - Winterset (film), a 1936 film adaptation of the play
- Winterset, Iowa, a city in Madison County, Iowa
  - Winterset City Park, a public, city-owned park in Winterset, Iowa
- Winterset Township, Russell County, Kansas
- Winterset Award, a Newfoundland and Labrador literary award

== See also ==
- Rachel Unthank and the Winterset, a British folk music group
