= Cedar Covered Bridge =

- Formerly listed on the U.S. National Register of Historic Places
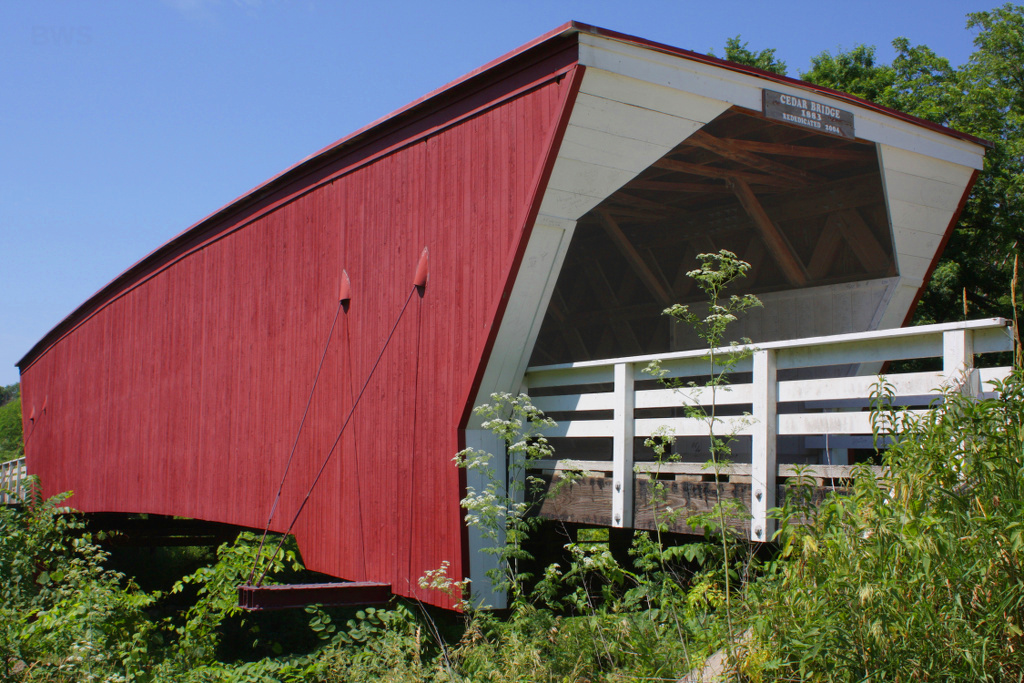
- The Cedar Covered Bridge in 2016

- Location within Iowa Location within the United States
- Nearest city: 1.5 miles (2.4 km) east of Winterset, Iowa
- Coordinates: 41°21′57″N 93°59′27″W
- Area: less than one acre
- Built: 1883; 1921 (moved)
- Built by: H.P. Jones
- Demolished: 2002
- NRHP reference No.: 76000786

Significant dates
- Added to NRHP: August 28, 1976
- Removed from NRHP: October 18, 2002

Cedar Bridge refers to three different bridges in Madison County, in the U.S. state of Iowa. The original Cedar Covered Bridge was built in 1883, moved in 1921, and was named to the National Register of Historic Places in 1976. The bridge was filmed in the 1995 movie The Bridges of Madison County and destroyed by arson in 2002. The second covered Cedar Bridge was built in 2004. This second bridge was destroyed by arsonists in 2017. The bridge was again rebuilt in 2019.

== The original Cedar Covered Bridge ==
Cedar Covered Bridge was built in 1883 by Harvey P. Jones at a location north of Winterset over Cedar Creek which is now U.S. 169. It was 78 feet (24 m) long. The bridge was moved in 1921 to the current location over Cedar Creek. A picture of this bridge is on the cover of the novel The Bridges of Madison County. It was renovated in 1998. It was named to the National Register of Historic Places in 1976.

This bridge was destroyed by arson on September 3, 2002. It was taken off the National Register of Historic Places on October 18, 2002.

== New Cedar Covered Bridge ==
A replacement bridge was built to the same plans and specifications as the original and using authentic materials and techniques. It reopened during October, 2004. On April 15, 2017, the new bridge was again destroyed by fire. As of April 19, 2017, Joel Davis, 18, of Norwalk, and Alexander Hoff, 17, of West Des Moines, were both arrested and charged with first-degree arson. The 17-year-old will be tried as an adult. A third person, Alivia Marie Bergmann, 19, of Des Moines, was arrested and charged with second-degree arson in May 2017.

In April 2018, Joel Davis was sentenced to 5 years' probation, a $1,000 fine, court costs, and restitution for the burned bridge. Alexander Hoff received five years of probation and a suspended 10-year prison sentence. Alivia Bergmann pleaded guilty to second-degree arson and was sentenced to 5 years' probation and bridge restitution.

The city again rebuilt the bridge and reopened it during the annual "Covered Bridge Festival" in October 2019.

== See also ==
- List of covered bridges in Madison County, Iowa
