= Winterset City Park =

City park in Winterset, Iowa

Coordinates: 41°19′48″N 94°00′16″W

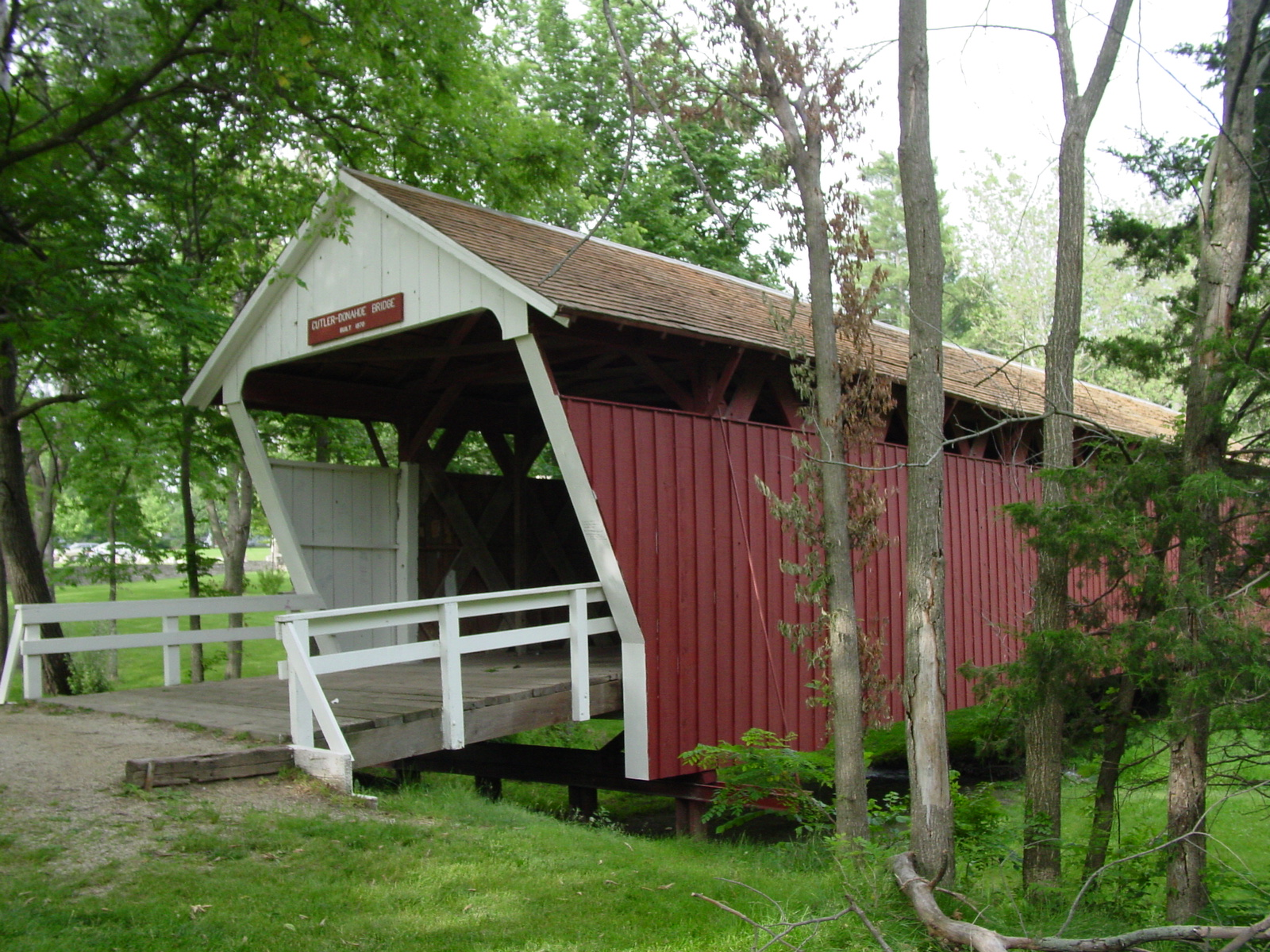
The Cutler-Donahoe Covered Bridge

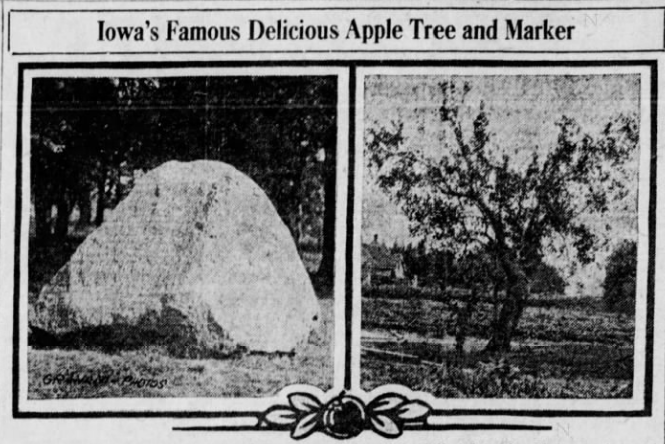
Red Delicious apple boulder before engraving and the original tree

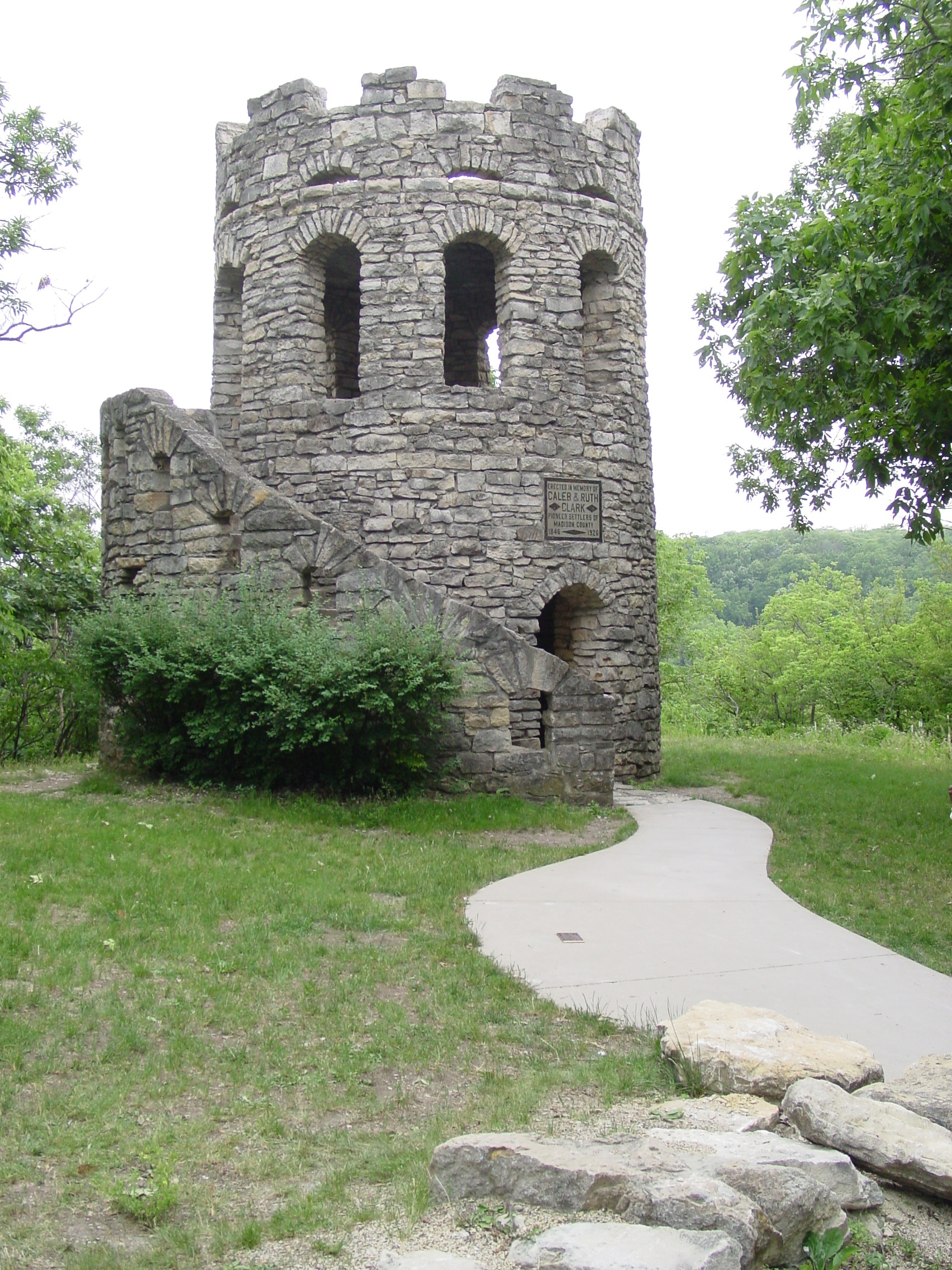
Clark Tower

Winterset City Park is a public, city-owned park in Winterset, Iowa, United States. The first acres of land was bought on May 21, 1869, for cattle to graze on. Over the next 50 years, land was purchased to increase the size of the park. On March 10, 2021, Winterset City Park was placed on the National Register of Historic Places after it was nominated in 2020.

== History ==
On May 21, 1869, Winterset bought 2.75 acres (1.11 ha) of land from Washington Cassidy and R. A. Sitt for $57.50. 12 acres (4.9 ha) of land was bought from C. D. Bevington and J. J. Hutchings for $2,000 on October 15, 1872. The final 6 acres (2.4 ha) of what was to be Winterset City Park years later was bought on September 17, 1825, from Henry Smith for $200. The acres of land was originally used for grazing cattle until the 1950s when the city was deciding on selling the land. The citizens disagreed and some of the women in Winterset gained permission from the city government to raise money to preserve the land as a place for leisure. The women were successful and the city decided to not sell the land. A. W. Crawford, who lived in Winterset, donated $25,000 in 1917 towards park renovation. Part of the money was used to buy 100 acres (40 ha) and miles of road through the park was created.

Clark Tower is located in the park. The tower was built from 1926 to 1927 to stand as a memorial for Caleb and Ruth Clanton Clark, one of the original pioneer families that settled in Madison County. It was built by the couple's descendants. The limestone tower is 12 feet (3.7 m) wide and 25 feet (7.6 m) high. A short distance from Clark Tower is a stone house's ruins, where it is claimed that Frank and Jesse James slept one night. It is also rumored that the house is haunted.

Around 1918, a descendant of one of the pioneer families donated $20,000 for the construction of a shelter house. The shelter house was not built until 1957 and it cost $28,000 to construct the house out of limestone. Another limestone building was built in 1961 to store park equipment and restrooms. Winterset City Park also has a log cabin that contains two rooms. To the north of the cabin, there is a six-ton granite boulder that commemorates the discovery of the Red Delicious apple in Madison County in 1872. The boulder was erected in 1922.

== Modern day ==
The 76-acre (31 ha) park contains the Cutler–Donahue Covered Bridge which was used in the novel The Bridges of Madison County and its film adaptation. Park facilities include shelters, picnic areas, restrooms, a sand-pit volleyball area, a campground, a hedge maze, and parking.

On March 10, 2021, Winterset City Park was placed on the National Register of Historic Places after it was nominated for its 2020 review.
