= Slow Waltz in Cedar Bend =

1993 novel by Robert James Waller

- First edition (US)
- Author: Robert James Waller
- Cover artist: Honi Werner
- Language: English
- Publisher: Warner Books (US)
- Publication date: 1993
- Publication place: United States
- Media type: Print
- Pages: 197
- ISBN: 0-446-51653-8

Slow Waltz in Cedar Bend is a novel by Robert James Waller. It was the third highest seller in the US in 1993, after Waller's Bridges of Madison County, to which this book was his followup, and John Grisham's The Client. Over two million copies were in print by the end of 1993. Like the main protagonist, Waller was an economics professor and so draws on his own experiences teaching at Northern Iowa University.

== Plot introduction ==
Michael Tillman is an unconventional Iowa tenured economics professor, rides a vintage motorcycle and walks barefoot as he teaches Boolean Algebra. He feels an immediate attraction to Jellie Braden when she walks into a dean's reception with her husband Jimmy. Their common experiences links Jellie and Michael together in India and within a year the affair is consummated. Jellie then disappears to India and Michael heads to Pondicherry to find Jellie and her complicated past. He eventually tracks her down to a hotel on Periyar Lake and her secrets are revealed...

== Reception ==
- Kirkus Reviews states that the novel is better than Bridges of Madison County and concludes that "Jellie does indeed have a Big Secret, but it doesn't impede the blissful reunion of the lovers or their return stateside, where Jimmy cheerfully moves out of their way. With its sliver of suspense, this is a marginally better product than the dreadful Bridges—slicker, not quite so soppy. It should make Waller's army of fans delirious."
- Publishers Weekly also has reservations: "Waller's attempt at academic satire is a dud, but he renders the Indian settings quite effectively".
