= The Bridges of Madison County (musical) =

2014 American musical

- Broadway Playbill cover
- Music: Jason Robert Brown
- Lyrics: Jason Robert Brown
- Book: Marsha Norman
- Basis: The Bridges of Madison County by Robert James Waller
- Productions: 2013 Williamstown; 2014 Broadway; 2015 US National Tour
- Awards: Tony Award for Best Original Score

The Bridges of Madison County is a musical, based on Robert James Waller's 1992 novel, with a book by Marsha Norman and music and lyrics by Jason Robert Brown. The musical premiered on Broadway at the Gerald Schoenfeld Theatre on February 20, 2014, and closed on May 18, 2014. The Broadway production was directed by Bartlett Sher and starred Kelli O'Hara as Francesca and Steven Pasquale as Robert. Brown's work on the musical won the 2014 Tony Awards for Best Original Score and Best Orchestrations after the Broadway production had already closed.

== Productions ==
=== Pre-Broadway ===
The Bridges of Madison County originated at the Williamstown Theatre Festival and ran from August 1 to August 18, 2013. The musical was directed by Bartlett Sher, with scene design by Michael Yeargan, costumes by Catherine Zuber, lighting by Donald Holder, sound by Jon Weston, and produced by Stacey Mindich. The cast featured Steven Pasquale (Robert), Elena Shaddow (Francesca), Daniel Jenkins (Bud), Nick Bailey (Michael), Caitlin Kinnunen (Carolyn), Cass Morgan (Marge), Michael X. Martin (Charlie), Whitney Bashor (Marian), John Paul Almon, Jennifer Allen, Emma Duncan, Luke Marinkovich, Laura Shoop, and Tim Wright.

Kelli O'Hara had been originally announced to play Francesca in the Williamstown production, but because she expected her second child in September 2013, she was replaced by Elena Shaddow.

=== Broadway ===
The musical played on Broadway at the Gerald Schoenfeld Theatre, starting previews on January 17, 2014, and officially opening on February 20, 2014. The musical closed on May 18, 2014, after 37 previews and 100 regular performances.

The creative team remained the same, with additional credits for Hair and Wig design by David Brian Brown and Make-Up Design by Ashley Ryan.

The original cast featured Pasquale, Bashor, Martin, Marinkovich, Morgan, Allen, and Kinnunen reprising their roles. The new cast members were Kelli O'Hara as Francesca, Hunter Foster as Bud, Derek Klena as Michael, Ephie Aardema, Katie Klaus, Aaron Ramey, and Dan Sharkey.

A recording of the original Broadway cast was recorded at Avatar Studios and released in April 2014 (digital) and May 2014 (CD) on the Ghostlight label featuring an 11-piece orchestra from the original Broadway production.

A reunion concert was staged on December 15, 2025 at Carnegie Hall with Pasquale, O’Hara, Klena, Bashor, Martin, Marinkovich, Morgan, Allen, and Kinnunen reprising their roles. Paul Alexander Nolan joined the cast for the concert taking over the role of Bud. Jason Robert Brown conducted the orchestra, and the concert included "He Forgave Me", a song originally sung by Chiara in Act Two that was featured in the Williamstown production, but was cut during previews on Broadway.

=== Subsequent productions ===
A US National tour, incorporating some minor changes, was announced by producers after the closing of the Broadway production. The tour began on November 28, 2015, at the Des Moines Civic Center in Des Moines, Iowa, with Brown conducting. Additional stops included the Ahmanson Theatre in Los Angeles, California; the Hobby Center in Houston, Texas; The Smith Center for the Performing Arts in Las Vegas, Nevada; the Orpheum Theatre in Minneapolis, Minnesota; and the Kennedy Center in Washington, D.C. The tour starred Elizabeth Stanley as Francesca and Andrew Samonsky as Robert. The tour ended in Greenville, South Carolina, in July 2016.

The international premiere of the musical was staged in Manila, the Philippines by Manila-based Atlantis Theatrical Entertainment Group. It ran from November 20 through December 6, 2015, at the Carlos P. Romulo Auditorium, RCBC Plaza, Makati. The production starred Joanna Ampil as Francesca and Mig Ayesa as Robert. It was directed by Bobby Garcia, with choreography by Cecil Martinez, musical direction by Ceejay Javier, scenic design by Faust Peneyra, costumes by Eric Pineda, and lighting by Jonjon Villareal.

The Boston professional premiere of the musical was staged by the Speakeasy Stage Company from May 6 through June 3, 2017. Directed by M. Bevin O'Gara, it starred Jennifer Ellis, Christiaan Smith, Alessandra Valea, Nick Siccone, Christopher Chew, and Kerry Dowling.

Utah Repertory Theater Company staged the Utah state premiere production from November 25 through December 10, 2017, directed by Utah Rep Artistic Director Johnny Hebda and company member Chase Ramsey, at the Regent Street Black Box inside the Eccles Theater in Salt Lake City, Utah, the first musical production in this venue. Stars Erin Royall Carlson as Francesca and Kevin Goertzen as Robert, with musical direction by Jeanne McGuire.

Menier Chocolate Factory in London staged the UK premiere that ran from 13 July 2019 to 14 September 2019. The production was directed by Trevor Nunn and starred Jenna Russell as Francesca and Edward Baker-Duly as Robert, along with Georgia Brown, Maddison Bulleyment, Shanay Holmes, Gillian Kirkpatrick, Paul F Monaghan, David Perkins and Dale Rapley.

A Danish production was planned for September 2020 at Fredericia Teater, but it was cancelled after the theater declared bankruptcy in early 2020.

The Bridges of Madison County had its Australian premiere at the Hayes Theatre in Sydney. The production opened on March 6, 2020, and was scheduled to run through April 5, but it closed in mid-March due to the COVID-19 pandemic. Produced by Matthew Henderson and Neil Gooding, it was directed by Gooding and starred Kate Maree Hoolihan as Francesca, Martin Crewes as Robert and Anton Berezin as Bud.

A Spanish-language production officially opened on December 13, 2022, at the Teatro Gran Vía in Madrid, following previews from November 18, with Nina as Francesca and Gerónimo Rauch as Robert.

The Bridges of Madison County had its Swiss premiere produced by Zurich English-Speaking Theatre (ZEST) at the Theater im Seefeld Neumünster in Zürich for a limited two-week run in November 2022.

On December 15, 2025, at 7PM in the Stern Auditorium/Perelman Stage at Carnegie Hall Carnegie Hall, originally produced on Broadway in 2014, the original cast of The Bridges of Madison County, led by Kelli O'Hara and Steven Pasquale, reunited for one night only at Carnegie Hall to benefit MCC Theater. Jason Robert Brown conducted a 20-piece orchestra in an expanded version of his Tony Award-winning score. The production was directed by Bartlett Sher, with musical direction by Tom Murray.

== Roles and principal casts ==
Character	Williamstown	Broadway	National tour
Character	2013	2014	2015
Francesca Johnson	Elena Shaddow	Kelli O'Hara	Elizabeth Stanley
Robert Kincaid	Steven Pasquale	Steven Pasquale	Andrew Samonsky
Bud Johnson	Daniel Jenkins	Hunter Foster	Cullen R. Titmas
Marge	Cass Morgan	Cass Morgan	Mary Callanan
Charlie	Michael X. Martin	Michael X. Martin	David Hess
Michael Johnson	Nick Bailey	Derek Klena	Dave Thomas Brown
Carolyn Johnson	Caitlin Kinnunen	Caitlin Kinnunen	Caitlin Houlahan
Marian	Whitney Bashor	Whitney Bashor	Katie Klaus

== Plot ==
=== Act I ===
Francesca Johnson, an Italian war bride living in Winterset, Iowa in 1965, has had eighteen years of quiet, largely unfulfilling farm life ("To Build a Home"). For three days, her family—stoic husband Bud, rebellious son Michael, and reluctant daughter Carolyn—are journeying to Indianapolis for the national 4-H fair to show Carolyn's prize steer, Stevie ("Home Before You Know It"). After her family departs, Francesca plans to spend the weekend relaxing, free from responsibilities. That afternoon, a blue pick-up truck pulls into her driveway, carrying Robert Kincaid, a photographer for the National Geographic. He has traveled from Washington State to photograph the famous covered bridges of Madison County, but has been unable to find the seventh covered bridge, the Roseman Bridge. Francesca agrees to help and to accompany him to the bridge for a short scouting trip ("Temporarily Lost"). Once at the Roseman Bridge, Francesca feels something developing between her and Robert ("What Do You Call a Man Like That?").

As the two return to the Johnson farm, Francesca invites Robert in for a glass of tea. Francesca, learning Robert was recently in her hometown of Naples, is eager to see pictures of his trip, but he does not have the pictures with him. They discuss everyday life in the quiet of Winterset ("You're Never Alone"). Realizing that it is too late for Robert to eat at one of the restaurants in town, Francesca persuades Robert to stay for a supper of homegrown vegetables and one of the recipes that Francesca brought with her from Italy. Francesca's neighbors Charlie and Marge, an older couple who are firmly entrenched in the farm life of Winterset, see Robert and his truck at Francesca's home and speculate about his being there. Robert, whose hippy presence has caused some commotion in the town, prepares dinner with Francesca. Francesca asks about the guitar that Robert has brought into the house, as well as its former owner, Robert's ex-wife, Marian ("Another Life"). While cooking, Robert and Francesca share a drink from a long-neglected bottle of brandy. After dinner, where both Robert and Francesca have clearly established a connection, Robert leaves in order to shoot the Roseman Bridge at dawn. Both contemplate their shared evening together. While Robert thinks about the dinner with Francesca ("Wondering"), Francesca receives a telephone call from Bud, during which she confides that she has opened the brandy that she had been saving.

The next day, while Robert is composing the photograph at the Roseman Bridge, Francesca shops for a new dress ("Look at Me"). Realizing that Robert has awoken feelings within her that she has not felt since she left Italy, she goes to the Roseman Bridge in search of him. At the bridge, Robert explains to her the process of composing a meaningful photograph ("World Inside a Frame"). Robert gives Francesca a copy of National Geographic featuring the photographs he took of post-war reconstruction in Naples. Francesca opens up, revealing her fiancé, Paolo, was killed during the war, and she tearfully describes how her life in Naples corresponds to the photographs that Robert took. Realizing that their connection is more significant than she had initially believed, Francesca again invites Robert to clean up and dine at the farm.

While Robert is cleaning up, Francesca receives another call from Bud: Carolyn's steer has advanced to the final and they have to stay another day at the fair. Francesca is disoriented from her interactions with Robert and Bud. Bud celebrates Carolyn's victory in the nearest bar and reflects on his relationship with Francesca ("Something from a Dream"). Francesca bathes and prepares for her dinner with Robert. While Robert waits in the kitchen, Francesca comes downstairs in the new pink dress that she bought that day. Finally alone with Robert and the implications of the time that they have shared, Francesca asks Robert if this is what always happens when he wanders into a town—she has bought a new dress and invited him in and everything is about to change for them. Robert asserts that he never steps into a world where people belong to each other and that he never intended for their relationship to go this far. They kiss, but are interrupted by a phone call from Marge. Marge asks Francesca to make plans the next day, but Francesca tells Marge that she already has plans to go to Des Moines. After the call, Robert and Francesca dance in the kitchen to the radio ("Get Closer"), and then realize that, while both unknowingly searching for a connection, they have found each other ("Falling into You"). After their dance, Francesca leads Robert upstairs to her bedroom.

=== Act II ===
At the 4-H national fair, Carolyn worries about Stevie the steer and Michael fights with Bud ("State Road 21"). At the farm, Robert is in bed with a still sleeping Francesca ("Who We Are and Who We Want to Be"). While preparing for their trip to Des Moines, Francesca explains to Robert how she came to live on an Iowa farm ("Almost Real"). Meanwhile, Charlie and Marge—having seen Robert's truck at Francesca's the whole night before—know that they have spent the night together.

After returning from Des Moines and with Francesca's family due home the next day, Francesca and Robert discuss their plans for the future. He asks her to leave Winterset with him, and she considers the reality of leaving her family behind ("Before and After You"/"One Second and a Million Miles"). Waking late the next morning, Robert again asks Francesca to come away with him; he is leaving Winterset at six o'clock and she must meet him in town before then. As he sets off for town, she tearfully promises to meet him. Later in the afternoon, Bud, Michael, and Carolyn return home. As Francesca welcomes them, Bud asks what she has prepared for dinner. Francesca immediately faces the realities of her life. Preoccupied, she constantly checks her watch while unsuccessfully attempting to say her goodbyes to a frustrated Michael, to a devoted Carolyn, and to a misunderstanding Bud. Francesca is worrying about dinner when Marge shows up, lasagna in hand. She realizes her affair is known to Marge, who has no intention of outing her to Bud. Marge comforts a distraught and uncertain Francesca. While Michael and Carolyn fight in their room, Francesca tries to tell Bud about her affair and asserts to him that she needs more from their relationship—she cannot go on feeling so alone.

Francesca then breaks up an argument between Bud and Michael. Attempting to ease the tension and with Francesca still in search of Robert, the whole family heads into town. Carolyn asks Francesca about the man staring at them from afar—it is Robert, waiting for Francesca to join him and leave the small Iowa town behind. Francesca—desperate and overcome—runs to Robert, but it is nothing more than a fantasy. Francesca is caught between the love of her life and the love of her family. She decides to stay with her children and her husband. Francesca and Robert, both devastated by the impossibility of their situation, exchange a final look before heading their separate ways.

In the subsequent years, Carolyn marries and has a child, Michael graduates from medical school, and Charlie and Bud both succumb to illness, leaving Francesca and Marge alone ("When I'm Gone"). After Bud's funeral, Francesca thanks Marge for her unspoken support throughout the years. Francesca, now alone in her empty home, hears the telephone ring. No one is on the other end, but she wonders if it could be Robert, even so many years later.

Robert, now an older man himself, calls the offices of the National Geographic to inform them that he will no longer be shooting photographs due to an illness of his own. He thanks his secretary for helping him wait for Francesca's call, which never came. Alone in his home, he packs all of his belongings save one letter, and reminisces about his time with Francesca and the following years that they have spent apart ("It All Fades Away"). In her own home, Francesca considers calling Robert, but instead looks through the National Geographic featuring the pictures of the Roseman Bridge. She finally takes the long-saved bottle of brandy off the shelf.

Francesca comes to the Roseman Bridge, letter in hand. Inside, she finds the photograph Robert took of her on the bridge, as well as a letter stating that he has died. He tells her that he understands why she made the choice that she did, and that her love for her family was part of his love for her. She tearfully considers the path that brought them together and ultimately separated them, but regrets neither her affair with him nor her choice to stay with her family. In their final moments, Robert and Francesca—appearing as they were when they first fell in love—embrace on the Roseman Bridge ("Always Better").

== Musical numbers ==
Act I

- To Build a Home - Francesca and Company
- Home Before You Know It - Bud, Michael, Carolyn and Francesca
- Temporarily Lost - Robert
- What Do You Call a Man Like That? - Francesca
- You're Never Alone - Bud and Company
- Another Life - Marian
- Wondering - Robert and Francesca
- Look At Me - Francesca, Robert and Company
- The World Inside a Frame - Robert
- Something From a Dream - Bud
- Get Closer - Marge and Radio Singers
- Falling Into You - Robert and Francesca

Act II

- State Road 21/The Real World - State Fair Singer, Michael, Carolyn and Company
- Who We Are and Who We Want to Be - Robert, Francesca and Company
- Almost Real - Francesca
- Before and After You/One Second and a Million Miles - Robert and Francesca
- When I'm Gone - Charlie, Bud and Company
- It All Fades Away - Robert
- Always Better - Francesca, Robert and Company

== Music ==
The music draws on various styles, but is largely influenced by American folk music, and there are several unaccompanied vocal parts with definitive folk undertones. The orchestra is mid-sized, with the musical being scored for piano (doubling on acoustic guitar for "State Road 21"), 2 guitars (one doubling on mandolin), acoustic/electric bass, 3 violins, 1 viola, 1 cello, and a sizeable array of percussion, including drum kit.

Brown stated that he had been looking for a project that was "serious and intense and overflowing with unrestrained passion," and referred to the production as his La Traviata.

== Critical reception ==
According to Playbill, the critical reviews were divided. Although the musical had "admirers who responded to Brown's score that mixed folk, country, pop and operatic passages, it failed to ignite wide audience appeal at the box office." Ben Brantley, of The New York Times, called the show "disproportionately long," but praised star O'Hara, calling her "one of the most exquisitely expressive stars in musical theater." He also praised composer Brown's score, calling it "sumptuous."

== Awards and nominations ==
The Bridges of Madison County received nine 2014 Drama Desk Award nominations: Outstanding Musical, Outstanding Actor in a Musical (Steven Pasquale), Outstanding Actress in a Musical (Kelli O'Hara), Outstanding Director of a Musical (Bartlett Sher), Outstanding Music (Jason Robert Brown), Outstanding Lyrics (Jason Robert Brown), Outstanding Book of a Musical (Marsha Norman), Outstanding Orchestrations (Jason Robert Brown) and Outstanding Sound Design in a Musical (Jon Weston). Brown won for Outstanding Orchestrations and Outstanding Music.

The musical received two nominations for the 2014 Outer Critics Circle Awards: Outstanding New Score (Broadway or Off-Broadway) and Outstanding Actress In A Musical (O'Hara).

The musical was nominated for three 2014 Drama League Awards: Outstanding Production Of A Broadway Or Off-Broadway Musical and Distinguished Performance Award (Kelli O'Hara and Steven Pasquale).

The musical received four 2014 Tony Award nominations: Best Performance by a Leading Actress in a Musical (Kelli O'Hara); Best Original Score (Music and/or Lyrics) Written for the Theatre (Brown) (music and lyrics); Best Lighting Design of a Musical (Donald Holder); Best Orchestrations (Jason Robert Brown). The musical won awards for Best Original Score and Best Orchestrations for Jason Robert Brown.

=== Original Broadway production ===
Year	Award	Category	Nominee	Result
2014	Tony Award	Best Original Score	Jason Robert Brown	Won
2014	Tony Award	Best Actress in a Musical	Kelli O'Hara	Nominated
2014	Tony Award	Best Lighting Design of a Musical	Donald Holder	Nominated
2014	Tony Award	Best Orchestrations	Jason Robert Brown	Won
2014	Drama Desk Award	Outstanding Musical		Nominated
2014	Drama Desk Award	Outstanding Music	Jason Robert Brown	Won
2014	Drama Desk Award	Outstanding Lyrics	Jason Robert Brown	Nominated
2014	Drama Desk Award	Outstanding Orchestrations	Jason Robert Brown	Won
2014	Drama Desk Award	Outstanding Director of a Musical	Bartlett Sher	Nominated
2014	Drama Desk Award	Outstanding Book of a Musical	Marsha Norman	Nominated
2014	Drama Desk Award	Outstanding Actor in a Musical	Steven Pasquale	Nominated
2014	Drama Desk Award	Outstanding Actress in a Musical	Kelli O'Hara	Nominated
2014	Drama Desk Award	Outstanding Sound Design in a Musical	Jon Weston	Nominated
2014	Outer Critics Circle Award	Outstanding New Score	Jason Robert Brown	Won
2014	Outer Critics Circle Award	Outstanding Actress in a Musical	Kelli O'Hara	Nominated
2014	Drama League Award	Outstanding Production of a Musical		Nominated
2014	Drama League Award	Distinguished Performance	Kelli O'Hara	Nominated
2014	Drama League Award	Distinguished Performance	Steven Pasquale	Nominated
