= Clark Tower =

Iowa tower of limestone built in 1926

Coordinates: 41.3199°N 94.0042°W

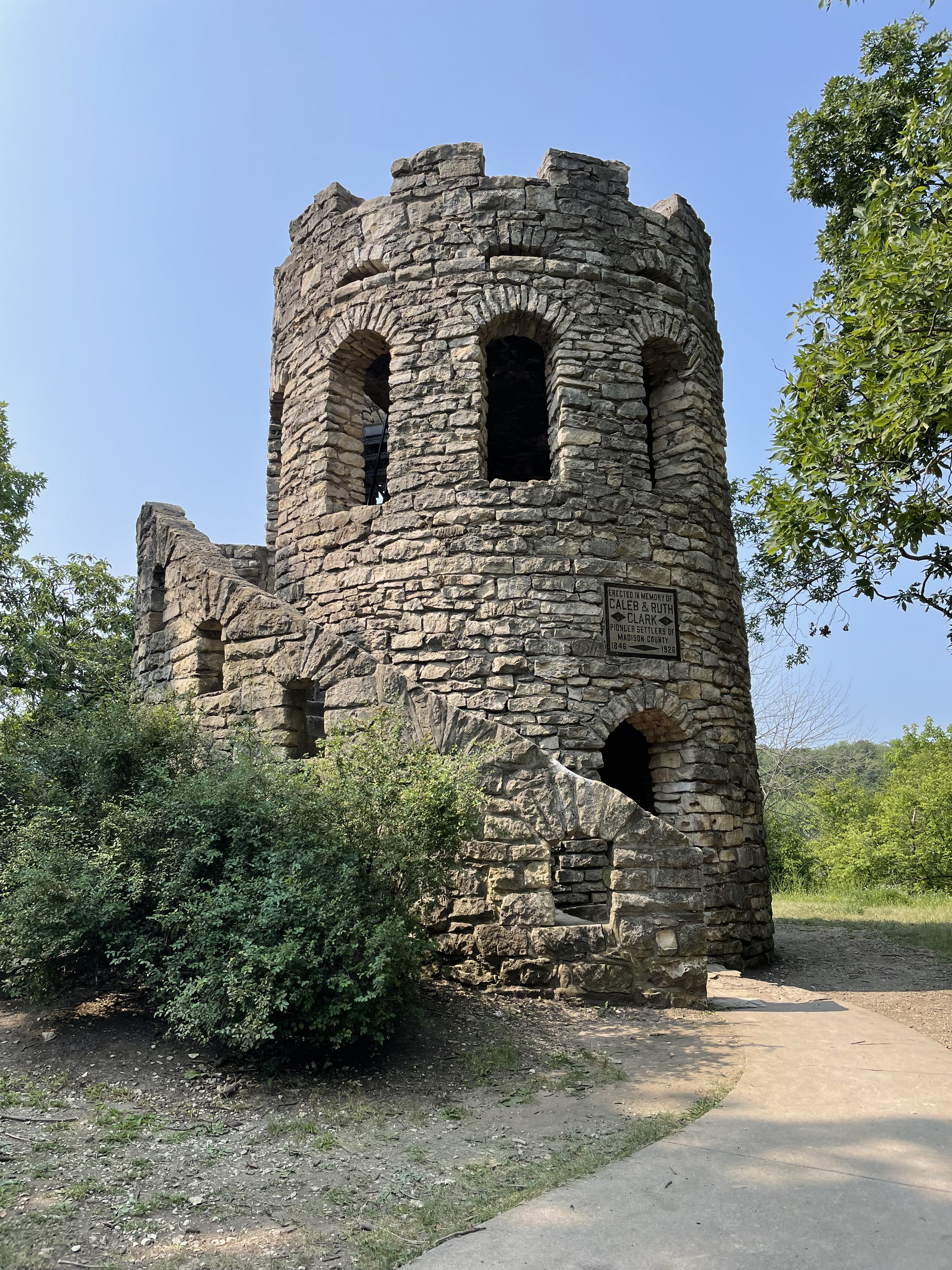
- Clark Tower in 2024
- Interactive map of the Clark Tower area

General information
- Completed: 1926

Height
- Height: 25 feet (7.6 metres)

Technical details
- Material: Limestone
- Floor count: 2

This article is about a structure in Winterset, Iowa. For the building commonly called Clark Tower in Memphis, Tennessee, see Clark Tower Executive Suites

Clark Tower is a 25 ft (7.6 m) tall, castle-like limestone tower located in Winterset City Park in Winterset, Iowa, United States.

== History ==
Clark Tower was erected in 1926, on the eightieth anniversary of the founding of Madison County, in memory of Caleb Clark, a stonemason who was the first white settler of Madison County, and his wife Ruth Clanton Clark.

On March 5, 2022, Clark Tower was struck by a powerful EF4 tornado during the Tornado outbreak of March 5–7, 2022, but survived.

== Gallery ==
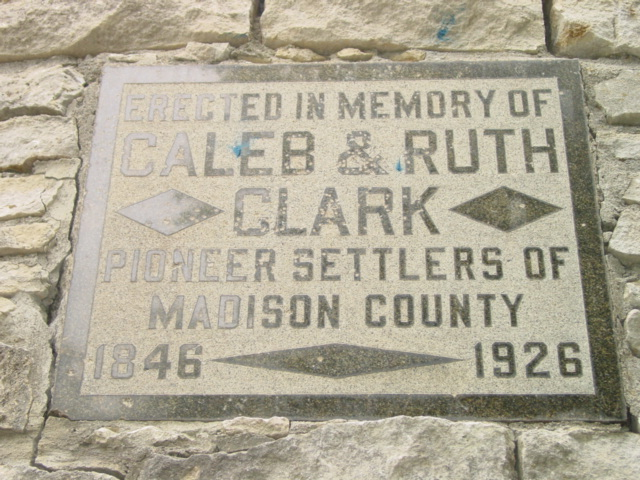
The dedication on Clark Tower

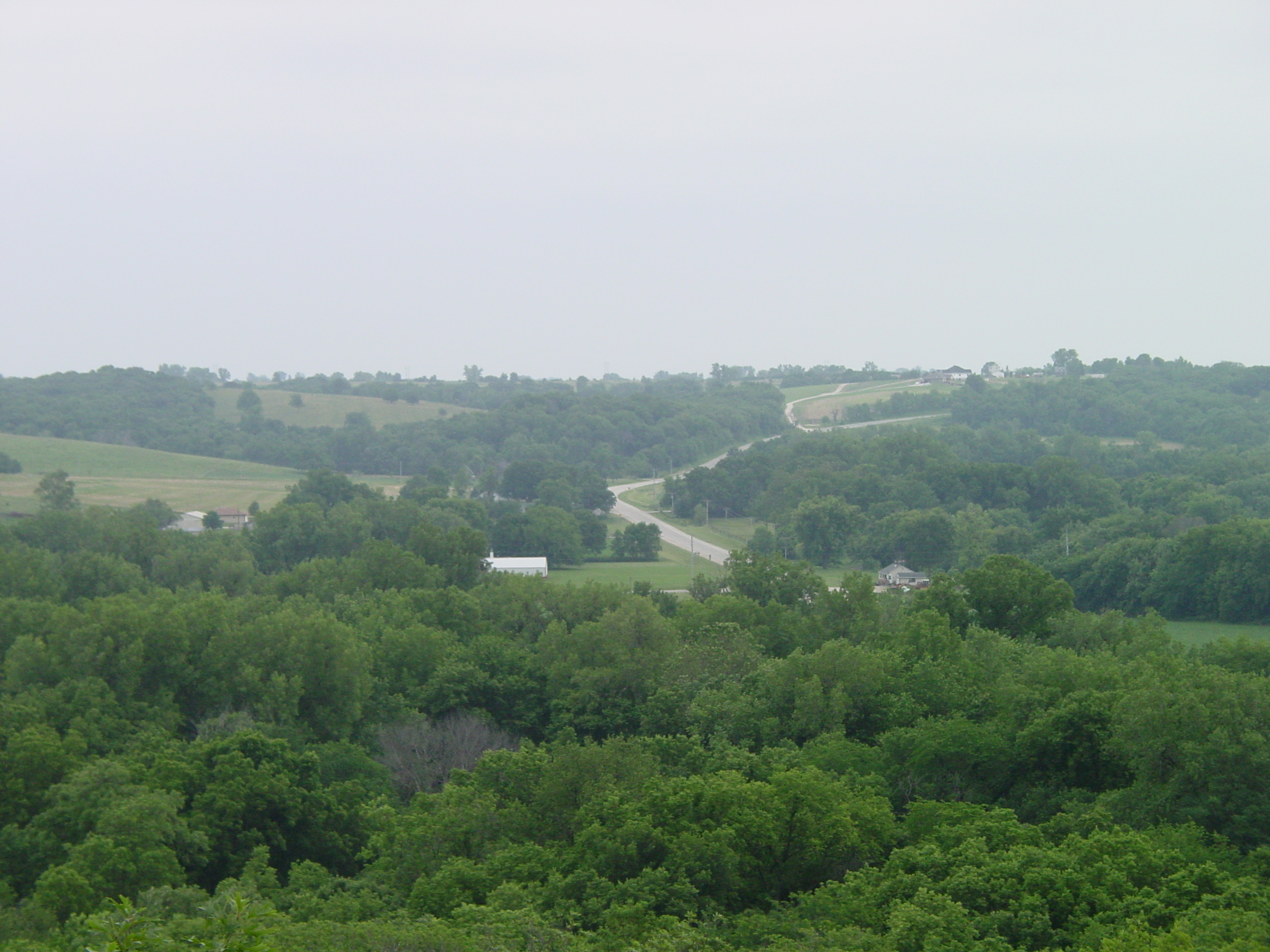
View from the top of Clark Tower
