= Walnut Township, Madison County, Iowa =

Township in Madison County, Iowa, U.S.

Coordinates: 41.200°N 93.956°W

Walnut Township is a township in Madison County, Iowa, in the United States.

== History ==
Walnut Township was established in 1851.
