= Crawford Township, Madison County, Iowa =

Township in Madison County, Iowa, U.S.

Coordinates: 41.3770°N 93.8439°W

Crawford Township is a township in Madison County, Iowa, in the United States.

== History ==
Crawford Township was named for Oliver Crawford, a pioneer settler who came from Ohio.
