= Webster, Madison County, Iowa =

Webster, Iowa
- Unincorporated community
- Location within Iowa Location within the United States
- Coordinates: 41°19′45″N 94°13′53″W
- Country: United States
- State: Iowa
- County: Madison
- Elevation: 1,102 ft (336 m)
- Time zone: UTC-6 (Central (CST))
  - Summer (DST): UTC-5 (CDT)
- Area code: 515
- GNIS feature ID: 462772

Webster is an unincorporated community in Madison County, Iowa, in the United States.

== History ==
Webster was laid out in 1855. The population was 178 in 1940.
