= Jefferson Township, Madison County, Iowa =

Township in Madison County, Iowa

Coordinates: 41.460°N 93.955°W

Jefferson Township is a township in Madison County, Iowa, in the United States.

== History ==
Jefferson Township was established in 1858. It was named for President Thomas Jefferson.
