= Monroe Township, Madison County, Iowa =

Township in Madison County, Iowa, U.S.

Coordinates: 41.200°N 94.071°W

Monroe Township is a township in Madison County, Iowa, in the United States.

The population at the 2020 census was 633.

== History ==
Monroe Township was organized in 1860.
