= South Township, Madison County, Iowa =

Township in Madison County, Iowa, U.S.

Coordinates: 41.290°N 93.844°W

South Township is a township in Madison County, Iowa, in the United States.

== History ==
South Township was established in 1849.
