= Ohio Township, Madison County, Iowa =

Township in Madison County, Iowa, U.S.

Coordinates: 41.203°N 93.844°W

Ohio Township is a township in Madison County, Iowa, in the United States.

== History ==
Ohio Township was organized in 1857. A majority of the early settlers being natives of Ohio caused the name to be selected.
