= Union Township, Madison County, Iowa =

Township in Madison County, Iowa

Coordinates: 41.374°N 93.952°W

Union Township is a township in Madison County, Iowa, in the United States.

== History ==
Union Township was established in 1849.
