= Hogback Covered Bridge =

- U.S. National Register of Historic Places
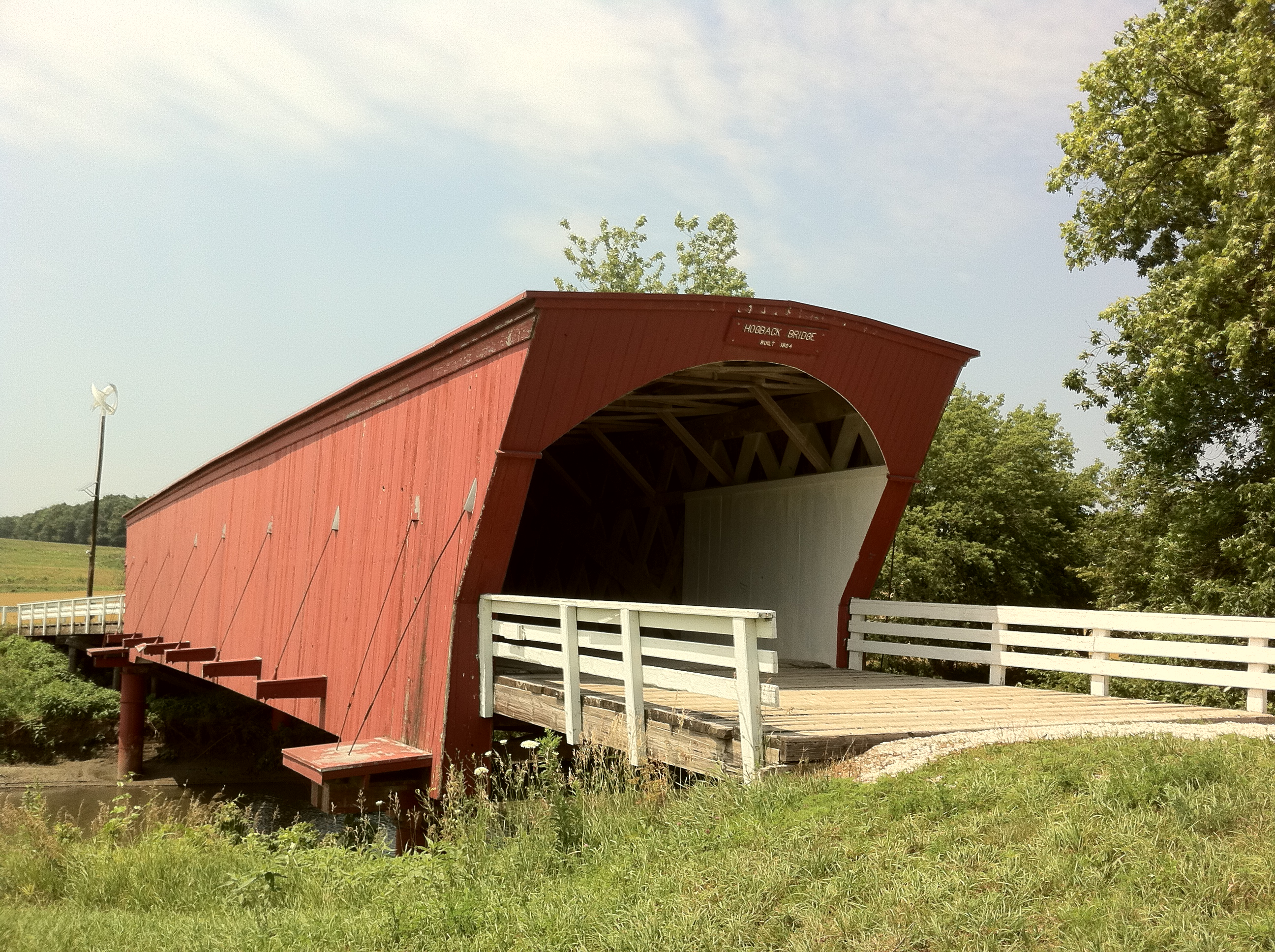
- Hogback Covered Bridge

- Location within Iowa Location within the United States
- Nearest city: Winterset, Iowa
- Coordinates: 41°23′11.3″N 94°2′50.8″W
- Area: less than one acre
- Built: 1884
- Built by: B. Jones
- Architectural style: covered bridge
- NRHP reference No.: 76000788
- Added to NRHP: August 28, 1976

The Hogback Covered Bridge is a historic covered bridge near Winterset, Iowa. Named after a nearby limestone ridge, it was built in 1884 by Harvey P. Jones and George K. Foster over the North River on Douglas Township Road. The 106-foot-long (32 m) bridge was designed with a Town lattice truss system. It was built with steel pylons to support the main span.

The Hogback Bridge was originally one of 19 covered bridges in Madison County; there are only six remaining covered bridges in the county. In 1992, the bridge was rehabilitated for the cost of $118,810 ($273,000 today). The Hogback Covered Bridge was added to the National Register of Historic Places in 1976.

== See also ==
- List of bridges documented by the Historic American Engineering Record in Iowa
