= Scott Township, Madison County, Iowa =

Township in Madison County, Iowa, U.S.

Coordinates: 41.286°N 93.955°W

Scott Township is a township in Madison County, Iowa, in the United States.

== History ==
Scott Township was organized in 1861.
