= Cutler–Donahoe Bridge =

- Cutler–Donahoe Covered Bridge
- U.S. National Register of Historic Places
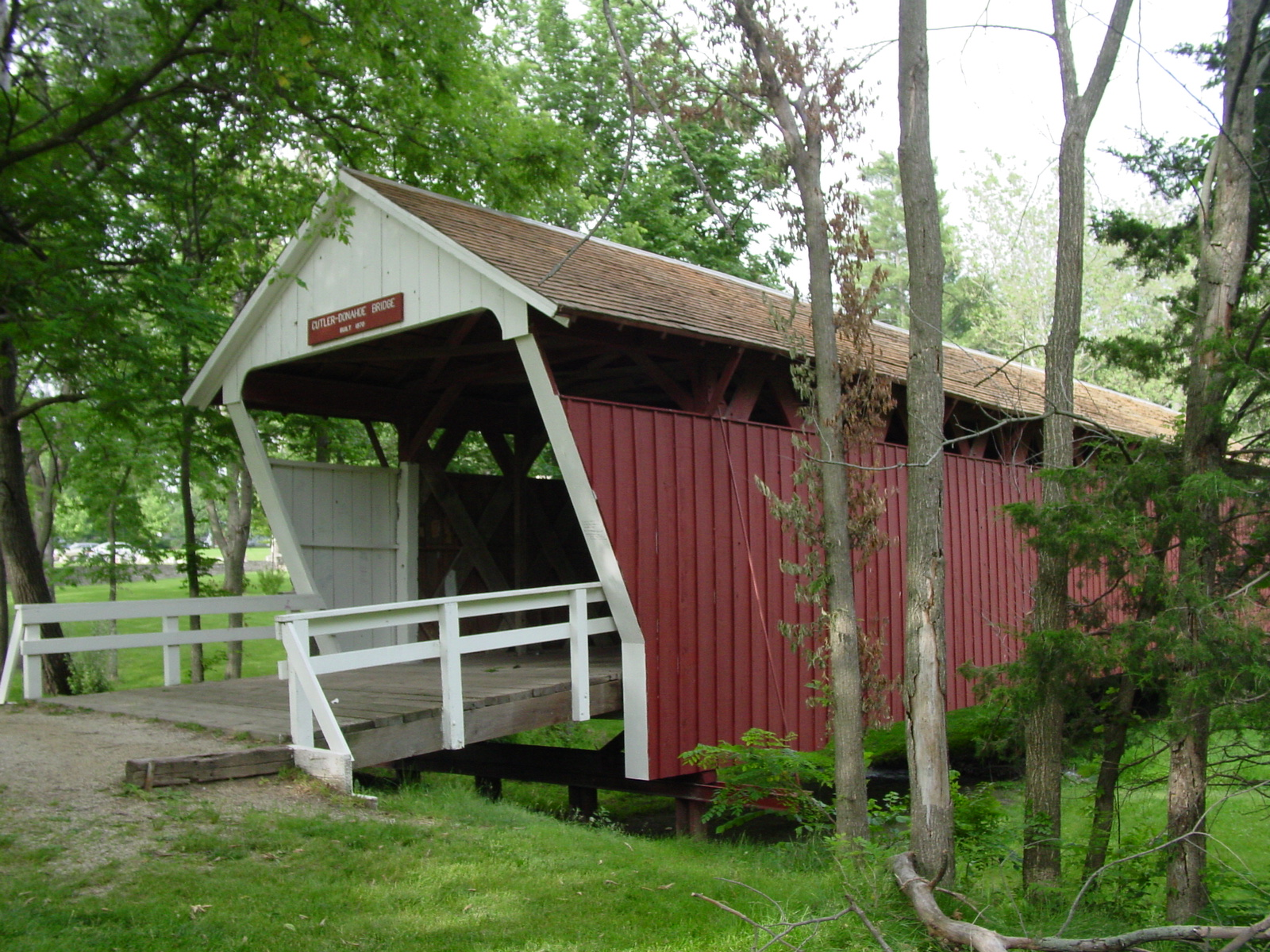
- The Cutler-Donahoe Covered Bridge on display in Winterset City Park.

- Location within Iowa Location within the United States
- Location: Winterset, Iowa
- Coordinates: 41°19′51″N 94°0′17″W
- Built: 1871
- NRHP reference No.: 76000787
- Added to NRHP: October 8, 1976

Cutler–Donahoe Bridge is a 79-foot-long (24 m) covered bridge in Madison County, Iowa. It was built in 1870 by Eli Cox. It originally crossed the North River near Bevington, Iowa. In 1979, the bridge was moved to its location at the entrance to the Winterset City Park.

== See also ==
- List of bridges documented by the Historic American Engineering Record in Iowa
- List of covered bridges in Madison County, Iowa
