= Douglas Township, Madison County, Iowa =

Township in Madison County, Iowa, U.S.

Coordinates: 41.37°N 94.10°W

Douglas Township is a township in Madison County, Iowa, in the United States.

== History ==
Douglas Township was organized in 1861.
