= Barney, Iowa =

- Unincorporated community
- Location within Iowa Location within the United States
- Coordinates: 41°10′00″N 94°00′14″W
- Country: United States
- State: Iowa
- County: Madison
- Elevation: 1,050 ft (320 m)
- Time zone: UTC-6 (Central (CST))
  - Summer (DST): UTC-5 (CDT)
- Area code: 515
- GNIS feature ID: 464456

Barney is an unincorporated community in Madison County, Iowa, in the United States.

== History ==
Barney was laid out in 1887.

Barney's population was 51 in 1902, and 75 in 1925. The population was 61 in 1940.
