= A Thousand Country Roads =

2002 novel by Robert James Waller

- First edition
- Author: Robert James Waller
- Publisher: John M. Hardy
- Publication date: April 2002
- Pages: 181
- ISBN: 0-9717667-1-1
- OCLC: 59488979
- Preceded by: The Bridges of Madison County

A Thousand Country Roads is a 2002 novel by Robert James Waller. The sequel to The Bridges of Madison County, the story picks up 16 years after traveling photographer Robert Kincaid has a four-day love affair with housewife Francesca Johnson. Rejected by Warner Books, which had published the bestselling Bridges in 1992, A Thousand Country Roads was published by a small press in Texas and received mixed reviews.

== Plot introduction ==
The story relates what happened to Robert Kincaid and Francesca Johnson following their passionate and ill-fated love affair in The Bridges of Madison County. Kincaid initially finds himself with just memories of a lonely existence and of Francesca Johnson, for whom he felt a great passion. Pushed by these memories and desiring to give meaning to his life, Kincaid takes to the road again. A Thousand Country Roads explores his development as he explores himself and the world around him on his journey.

== Reception ==
A review of A Thousand Country Roads in Library Journal said, "while the tale itself deals with the powerful subjects of love, aging, loneliness, and death, it is rather slight. Be warned that the overt sentimentality will either make you cry or gag, depending on your mindset." Entertainment Weekly panned the sequel for its lack of a true love story, calling it "A pile of pompous goop". TIME Magazine was more positive, arguing, "Roads has none of the pounding passion of Bridges but twice the pathos – it's a book about aging, a reprise in a minor key."

== See also ==
- The Bridges of Madison County
