= Madison County, Iowa =

County in Iowa, United States

- County
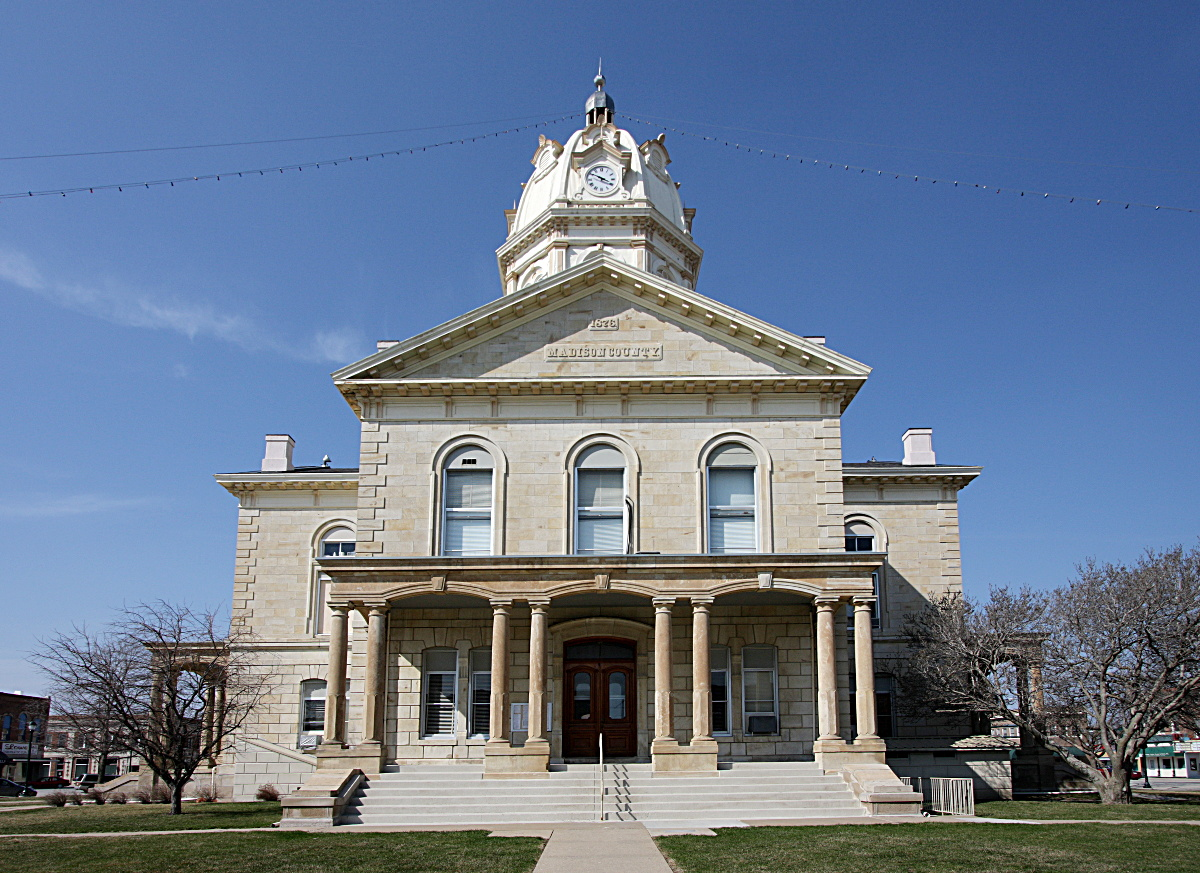
- The Madison County Courthouse in Winterset

- Location within the U.S. state of Iowa
- Coordinates: 41°20′N 94°01′W
- Country: United States
- State: Iowa
- Founded: January 13, 1846
- Named for: James Madison
- Seat: Winterset
- Largest city: Winterset

Area
  - Total: 562 sq mi (1,460 km^{2})
  - Land: 561 sq mi (1,450 km^{2})
  - Water: 1.2 sq mi (3.1 km^{2}) 0.2%

Population (2020)
  - Total: 16,548
  - Estimate (2025): 17,270 ▲
  - Density: 29.5/sq mi (11.4/km^{2})
- Time zone: UTC−6 (Central)
  - Summer (DST): UTC−5 (CDT)
- Congressional district: 3rd
- Website: madisoncounty.iowa.gov
- Iowa county number 61

Madison County is a county located in the U.S. state of Iowa. As of the 2020 census, the population was 16,548. The county seat is Winterset. Madison County is included in the Des Moines–West Des Moines, IA Metropolitan Statistical Area. Madison County is famous for being the county where John Wayne was born, and for a number of covered bridges. These bridges were featured in Robert James Waller's 1992 novella The Bridges of Madison County, as well as the 1995 film and 2014 musical based on it.

== History ==
Madison County was formed on January 13, 1846. It has been self-governed since 1849. It was named after James Madison (1751–1836), the fourth President of the United States (between 1809 and 1817). Hiram Hurst was the first European-American settler in Madison County, having come from Missouri about April 15, 1846.

== Geography ==
According to the United States Census Bureau, the county has a total area of 562 square miles (1,460 km^{2}), of which 561 square miles (1,450 km^{2}) is land and 1.2 square miles (3.1 km^{2}) (0.2%) is water.

=== Major highways ===
- Interstate 80 (in the far northwestern corner of the county)
- U.S. Highway 6
- U.S. Highway 169
- Iowa Highway 92

=== Adjacent counties ===
- Dallas County (north)
- Warren County (east)
- Clarke County (southeast)
- Union County (southwest)
- Adair County (west)
- Polk County (northeast, meeting in a 4-corners)

== Demographics ==
Historical population
Census	Pop.	Note	%±
1850	1,179		—
1860	7,339		522.5%
1870	13,884		89.2%
1880	17,224		24.1%
1890	15,977		−7.2%
1900	17,710		10.8%
1910	15,621		−11.8%
1920	15,020		−3.8%
1930	14,331		−4.6%
1940	14,525		1.4%
1950	13,131		−9.6%
1960	12,295		−6.4%
1970	11,558		−6.0%
1980	12,597		9.0%
1990	12,483		−0.9%
2000	14,019		12.3%
2010	15,679		11.8%
2020	16,548		5.5%
2025 (est.)	17,270	▲	4.4%
U.S. Decennial Census; 1790–1960 1900–1990; 1990–2000 2010–2020

=== 2020 census ===
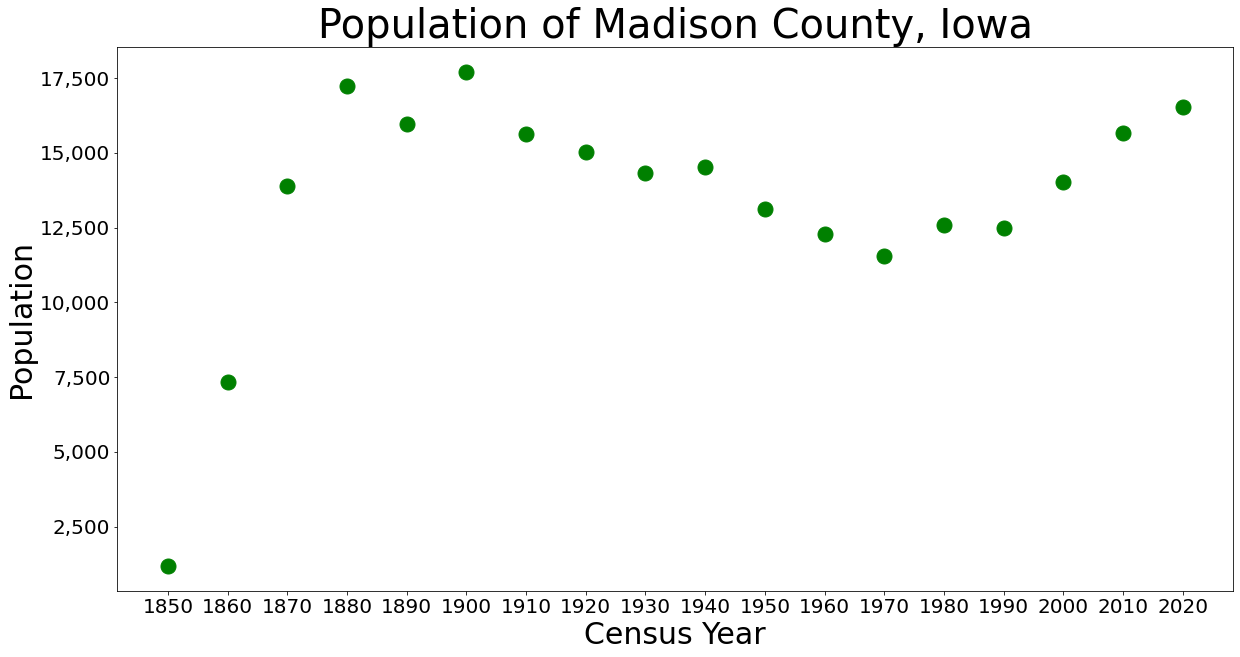
Population of Madison County from the U.S. census data

As of the 2020 census, the county had a population of 16,548, which gave a population density of 29.4/sq mi (11.3/km^{2}). The median age was 41.2 years; 25.5% of residents were under the age of 18 and 18.1% were 65 years of age or older. For every 100 females there were 98.7 males, and for every 100 females age 18 and over there were 96.5 males age 18 and over.

The racial makeup of the county was 95.99% reporting one race, with 94.3% White (92.42% non-Hispanic White), 0.3% Black or African American, 0.2% American Indian and Alaska Native, 0.5% Asian, 0.1% Native Hawaiian and Pacific Islander, 0.6% from some other race, and 4.0% from two or more races. Hispanic or Latino residents of any race comprised 1.9% of the population.

30.7% of residents lived in urban areas, while 69.3% lived in rural areas.

There were 6,436 households in the county, of which 32.1% had children under the age of 18 living in them. Of all households, 59.9% were married-couple households, 15.0% were households with a male householder and no spouse or partner present, and 19.3% were households with a female householder and no spouse or partner present. About 24.5% of all households were made up of individuals and 12.3% had someone living alone who was 65 years of age or older.

There were 6,913 housing units, of which 6.9% were vacant. Among occupied housing units, 80.0% were owner-occupied and 20.0% were renter-occupied. The homeowner vacancy rate was 1.3% and the rental vacancy rate was 6.0%.

=== 2010 census ===
As of the 2010 census recorded a population of 15,679 in the county, with a population density of 27.9/sq mi (10.8/km^{2}). There were 6,554 housing units, of which 6,025 were occupied.

=== 2000 census ===
As of the 2000 census, there were 14,019 people, 5,326 households, and 3,925 families in the county. The population density was 25 inhabitants per square mile (9.7/km^{2}). There were 5,661 housing units at an average density of 10 per square mile (3.9/km^{2}). The racial makeup of the county was 98.57% White, 0.09% Black or African American, 0.27% Native American, 0.18% Asian, 0.02% Pacific Islander, 0.19% from other races, and 0.68% from two or more races. 0.75% of the population were Hispanic or Latino of any race.

Of the 5,326 households 34.80% had children under the age of 18 living with them, 63.90% were married couples living together, 7.00% had a female householder with no husband present, and 26.30% were non-families. 22.70% of households were one person and 11.70% were one person aged 65 or older. The average household size was 2.58 and the average family size was 3.04.

The age distribution was 27.10% under the age of 18, 6.90% from 18 to 24, 27.40% from 25 to 44, 23.40% from 45 to 64, and 15.20% 65 or older. The median age was 38 years. For every 100 females, there were 97.40 males. For every 100 females age 18 and over, there were 93.10 males.

The median household income was $41,845 and the median family income was $48,289. Males had a median income of $31,126 versus $24,095 for females. The per capita income for the county was $19,357. About 4.60% of families and 6.70% of the population were below the poverty line, including 6.60% of those under age 18 and 10.40% of those age 65 or over.

== Covered bridges ==
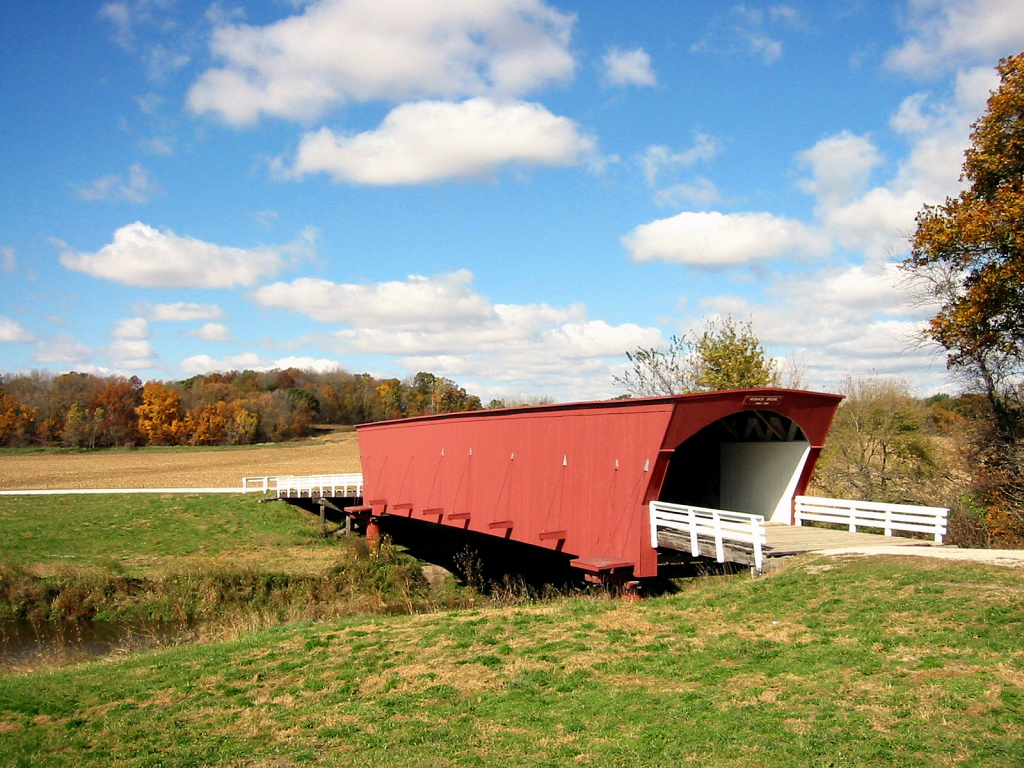
Hogback Bridge, one of six remaining covered bridges in Madison County

There are six extant covered bridges in Madison County, of the original sixteen:

- Cedar Bridge built 1883, destroyed 2002, rebuilt 2004, 76 feet (23 m) long. The rebuilt bridge was destroyed by a fire in 2017. A replica replaced it in 2019.
- Cutler-Donahoe Bridge built 1870, 79 feet (24 m) long.
- Hogback Covered Bridge built 1884, 97 feet (30 m) long.
- Holliwell Bridge built 1880, 122 feet (37 m) long. Featured in the 1995 movie The Bridges of Madison County.
- Imes Bridge built 1870, 81 feet (25 m) long.
- Roseman Covered Bridge built 1883, 107 feet (33 m) long, is the best known one, as it is featured in the 1995 movie The Bridges of Madison County.

The remaining covered bridges were designed by Harvey P. Jones and George K. Foster, with the following exceptions: Eli Cox built the Cutler-Donahoe Bridge, and J. P. Clark built the Imes Bridge.

== Tunnel ==
Madison County is home to the only highway tunnel in Iowa, Harmon Tunnel, through the neck of an incised meander of the Middle River in Pammel Park.

== Communities ==
=== Incorporated Communities ===
- Bevington
- Earlham
- East Peru
- Macksburg
- Patterson
- St. Charles
- Truro
- Winterset

=== Unincorporated communities ===
- Barney
- Hanley
- Old Peru
- Pitzer
- Webster

=== Townships ===
- Crawford
- Douglas
- Grand River
- Jackson
- Jefferson
- Lee
- Lincoln
- Madison
- Monroe
- Ohio
- Penn
- Scott
- South
- Union
- Walnut
- Webster

=== Population ranking ===
The population ranking of the following table is based on the 2020 census of Madison County.

† county seat

Rank	City/Town/etc.	Municipal type	Population (2020 Census)	Population (2024 Estimate)
1	† Winterset	City	5,353	5,382
2	Earlham	City	1,410	1,435
3	St. Charles	City	640	636
4	Truro	City	509	522
5	Patterson	City	176	202
6	East Peru	City	115	113
7	Macksburg	City	97	106
8	Bevington (partially in Warren County)	City	57	49

== Politics ==
For most of its history, Madison County has primarily supported the Republican Party in presidential elections. From 1880 to 1960, the county only failed to back the party's candidate in 1932 when Herbert Hoover was defeated in a national landslide for reelection by Franklin D. Roosevelt. The county was much more of a swing area between 1964 and 1996, voting for the national winner in every presidential election between 1964 and 2004 aside from 1988 when Michael Dukakis was boosted to an inflated margin of victory statewide by a farm crisis. Since the start of the third millennium, Republicans have carried the county in every presidential election. Donald Trump also produced the county's strongest Republican presidential victory since 1952 in 2016, winning by a margin of over 30 percent.

United States presidential election results for Madison County, Iowa
Year	Republican		Democratic		Third party(ies)	
Year	No.	%	No.	%	No.	%
1896	2,313	50.28%	2,224	48.35%	63	1.37%
1900	2,590	55.67%	1,907	40.99%	155	3.33%
1904	2,602	63.20%	1,190	28.90%	325	7.89%
1908	2,425	59.54%	1,404	34.47%	244	5.99%
1912	1,274	33.79%	1,185	31.43%	1,311	34.77%
1916	1,871	51.26%	1,711	46.88%	68	1.86%
1920	4,465	68.83%	1,899	29.27%	123	1.90%
1924	4,191	60.80%	1,367	19.83%	1,335	19.37%
1928	4,364	66.15%	2,178	33.02%	55	0.83%
1932	2,663	47.09%	2,923	51.69%	69	1.22%
1936	4,188	55.04%	3,365	44.22%	56	0.74%
1940	4,477	58.91%	3,094	40.71%	29	0.38%
1944	3,737	59.20%	2,550	40.39%	26	0.41%
1948	3,207	52.38%	2,827	46.17%	89	1.45%
1952	4,967	69.48%	2,131	29.81%	51	0.71%
1956	3,883	59.34%	2,652	40.53%	9	0.14%
1960	3,804	58.26%	2,722	41.69%	3	0.05%
1964	2,250	38.93%	3,518	60.87%	12	0.21%
1968	3,151	55.49%	2,192	38.60%	336	5.92%
1972	3,480	59.35%	2,234	38.10%	150	2.56%
1976	2,681	45.36%	3,109	52.61%	120	2.03%
1980	3,320	51.79%	2,496	38.93%	595	9.28%
1984	3,168	50.60%	3,067	48.99%	26	0.42%
1988	2,410	41.11%	3,421	58.36%	31	0.53%
1992	2,421	39.37%	2,525	41.06%	1,203	19.56%
1996	2,550	40.30%	3,070	48.52%	707	11.17%
2000	3,662	52.55%	3,093	44.38%	214	3.07%
2004	4,538	56.70%	3,380	42.23%	86	1.07%
2008	4,579	53.99%	3,733	44.02%	169	1.99%
2012	4,638	54.84%	3,630	42.92%	190	2.25%
2016	5,360	62.07%	2,678	31.01%	598	6.92%
2020	6,507	66.24%	3,134	31.90%	183	1.86%
2024	6,864	68.45%	3,008	30.00%	156	1.56%

== Education ==
School districts include:

- Adel-De Soto-Minburn Community School District - Formed on July 1, 1993 through the merger of the Adel-DeSoto and Central Dallas school districts.
- Earlham Community School District
- East Union Community School District
- Interstate 35 Community School District
- Martensdale-St. Marys Community School District
- Nodaway Valley Community School District - Formed on July 1, 2000 through the merger of the Bridgewater-Fontanelle and the Greenfield school districts.
- Van Meter Community School District
- Winterset Community School District

Former districts

- Orient-Macksburg Community School District - Dissolved on July 1, 2026.

== See also ==
- Madison County Courthouse
- National Register of Historic Places listings in Madison County, Iowa
