= Imes Bridge =

- Imes Covered Bridge
- U.S. National Register of Historic Places
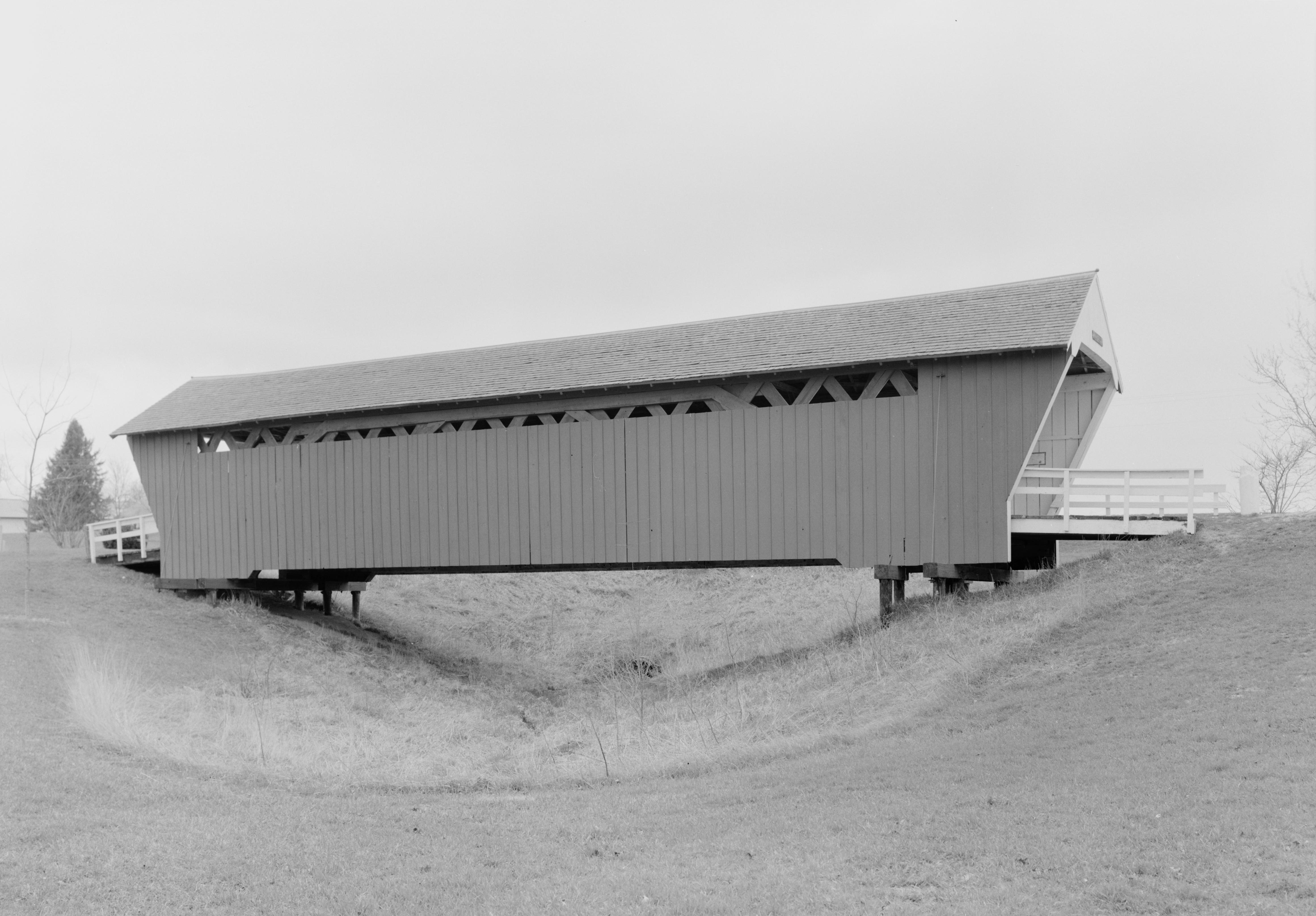
- Northwestern side of the bridge

- Location within Iowa Location within the United States
- Nearest city: St. Charles, Iowa
- Coordinates: 41°17′21″N 93°48′03″W
- Built: 1870
- Architect: J. P. Clark
- NRHP reference No.: 76000784
- Added to NRHP: February 9, 1979

The Imes Bridge is a wooden covered bridge in Madison County, Iowa. Built in 1870, it was originally located over the Middle River. In 1887 it was moved to a spot over Clinton Creek, and in 1977 was moved again to its present site. It is 81 feet (25 m) long and is the oldest of the remaining covered bridges in Madison County. It was renovated in 1997 for a cost of $31,807.

== See also ==
- List of bridges documented by the Historic American Engineering Record in Iowa
- List of covered bridges in Madison County, Iowa
