= The Bridges of Madison County (film) =

1995 American romantic drama film directed by Clint Eastwood

- Theatrical release poster by Bill Gold
- Directed by: Clint Eastwood
- Screenplay by: Richard LaGravenese; Clint Eastwood (uncredited); Steven Spielberg (uncredited)
- Based on: The Bridges of Madison County by Robert James Waller
- Produced by: Clint Eastwood; Kathleen Kennedy
- Starring: Clint Eastwood; Meryl Streep
- Cinematography: Jack N. Green
- Edited by: Joel Cox
- Music by: Lennie Niehaus
- Production companies: Warner Bros.; Amblin Entertainment; Malpaso Productions
- Distributed by: Warner Bros.
- Release date: June 2, 1995
- Running time: 134 minutes
- Country: United States
- Language: English
- Budget: $22 million
- Box office: $182 million

The Bridges of Madison County is a 1995 American romantic drama film based on the 1992 bestselling novel of the same name by Robert James Waller. It was produced and directed by Clint Eastwood, who also starred in the film alongside Meryl Streep. The screenplay was adapted by Richard LaGravenese with rewrites by Eastwood and Steven Spielberg. Kathleen Kennedy was co-producer. It was produced by Amblin Entertainment and Malpaso Productions, and distributed by Warner Bros..

The Bridges of Madison County is set in 1965 and features Italian war bride Francesca Johnson (Meryl Streep), who lives with her husband and two children on their Iowa farm. That year she meets National Geographic photojournalist Robert Kincaid (Clint Eastwood), who comes to Madison County, Iowa to photograph its historic covered bridges. With Francesca's family away for a short trip, the couple have an intense, four-day love affair. The film was released on June 2, 1995 and earned $182 million worldwide. It received generally positive reviews upon release, with high praise directed towards Streep's performance, earning her a Best Actress nomination at the 68th Academy Awards.

== Plot ==
In the present, adult siblings Michael and Carolyn Johnson arrive at the Iowa farmhouse of their recently deceased mother, Francesca, to settle her estate. They are shocked upon learning that she had requested to be cremated and her ashes scattered from Roseman Covered Bridge, rather than be buried next to her late husband, Richard.

Michael initially refuses, but while he and Carolyn look through the safe deposit box, they discover an envelope containing photographs, letters, and a key. The photos are of Francesca taken at the Holliwell Covered Bridge and the letters are from a man named Robert Kincaid.

The key is to Francesca's locked hope chest. In it are three hardbound notebooks. There are also several National Geographic magazines, including one featuring Madison County's covered wooden bridges, old cameras, a book, and other mementos. The magazine includes a photo of Kincaid, who photographed the bridges; he is wearing Francesca's crucifix pendant.

As Michael and Carolyn begin reading Francesca's notebooks, the film flashes back to 1965. Francesca, a WWII war bride originally from Bari, Italy, stays home while her husband and teenage son and daughter attend the state fair for the next four days.

Robert Kincaid, a National Geographic photojournalist on assignment to photograph the county's historic bridges, arrives at the Johnson farm, asking for directions to Roseman Bridge. Francesca rides along to show him the way. Their subsequent affair occurs over four days.

Francesca details the intense affair and its lasting influence on her and Robert, hoping Michael and Carolyn will understand and honor her final request. She and Robert fell deeply in love and nearly ran away together. Francesca, confined to a passionless marriage, was unable to abandon her teenage children and loyal husband.

Though Francesca loved Robert, she questioned whether their spontaneous relationship could survive over time. He, moved by their brief encounter, found renewed meaning in life and his true calling as an artist. Memories of Robert helped sustain her through the remaining years on the farm.

After her husband's death, Francesca attempted to contact Robert, but he had left National Geographic and his whereabouts were unknown. She later learned that he died about three years after her husband, and left his belongings to her. Robert's ashes were scattered from Roseman Bridge.

In the present, Michael and Carolyn, struggling with their own marriages, are deeply moved by their mother's story. They find new directions to their individual lives and finally carry out their mother's wishes to scatter her ashes from Roseman Bridge.

== Cast ==
- Clint Eastwood as Robert Kincaid
- Meryl Streep as Francesca Johnson
- Annie Corley as Carolyn Johnson
  - Sarah Kathryn Schmitt as young Carolyn
- Victor Slezak as Michael Johnson
  - Christopher Kroon as young Michael
- Jim Haynie as Richard Johnson
- Phyllis Lyons as Betty
- Debra Monk as Madge
- Richard Lage as Lawyer Peterson
- Michelle Benes as Lucy Redfield

== Production ==
=== Development ===
"I've been that guy a little bit, going off by myself years ago in a pickup truck into Nevada, scouting locations for High Plains Drifter. But I didn't stop off with any housewives while doing that."

— Clint Eastwood on Robert Kincaid

Amblin Entertainment, a production company founded by Steven Spielberg, bought the film rights to Waller's novel for $25,000 in late 1991, before its publication—by the time of the film's release, the novel sold 9.5 million copies worldwide. Spielberg first asked Sydney Pollack to direct, who got Kurt Luedtke to draft the first version of the adaptation but then bowed out; Ronald Bass was brought in by Kathleen Kennedy and Spielberg to work on the script, but they were unsatisfied with the results. But a third draft by Richard LaGravenese was liked by Eastwood, who quite early had been cast for the male lead, and by Spielberg, both saw potential in the draft but decided to rewrite it together to adjust imperfections that they perceived and find the perfect voice for the project, Spielberg enjoyed so much working with Eastwood and LaGravenese writing the script with them that he considered making Bridges his next film after Schindler's List (1993), which was in post-production at the time. Both men liked that LaGravenese's script presented the story from Francesca's point of view; but Eastwood and Spielberg introduce the framing device of having Francesca's adult children discover and read her diaries. When Spielberg decided not to direct, he then brought in Bruce Beresford, who got Alfred Uhry to draft another version of the script; when Warner Bros. Pictures, Spielberg, and Eastwood all preferred their draft with LaGravenese, Beresford dropped out and Eastwood asked to direct the film and co-produce it with his production company Malpaso Productions to have more control over the movie and make the project move forward.

Catherine Deneuve and Isabella Rossellini did screen tests to play Francesca, but despite Spielberg's initial reluctance, Eastwood had advocated Meryl Streep for the role from the beginning.

=== Filming ===
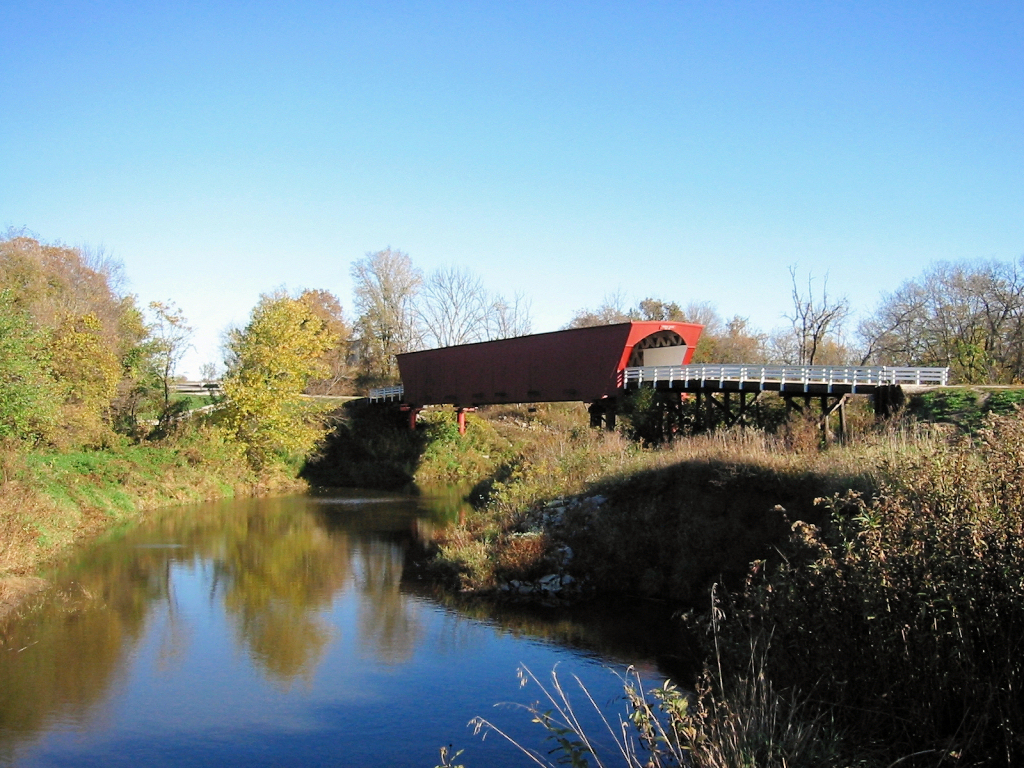
Roseman Bridge in Winterset, Iowa.

Principal photography took 42 days, ending on November 1, 1994, ten days ahead of Eastwood's 52-day schedule; Eastwood filmed it chronologically from Francesca's point of view, "because it was important to work that way. We were two people getting to know each other, in real-time, as actors and as the characters." It was filmed on location in Madison County, Iowa, including the town of Winterset, and in the Dallas County town of Adel.

=== Post-production ===
The MPAA ratings board initially gave the film an "R" rating, for the line "Or should we just fuck on the linoleum one last time?", a line of dialogue spoken sarcastically by Francesca; Eastwood appealed, and the rating was reduced to a PG-13.

== Release and reception ==
=== Box office ===
The Bridges of Madison County opened theatrically on June 2, 1995, in 1,805 venues. It grossed $10,519,257 in its opening weekend, ranking number two at the US box office, behind Casper (which was in its second weekend and coincidentally features Eastwood in a cameo). It was number one at the Japanese box office for nine consecutive weeks, grossing over $35 million. At the end of its run, the film grossed $71,516,617 in the United States and Canada and $110,500,000 overseas for a worldwide total of $182,016,617.

=== Critical response ===
On Rotten Tomatoes, The Bridges of Madison County has a score of 90% based on 60 reviews, with an average rating of 7.40/10. The site's consensus states: "Sentimental, slow, schmaltzy, and very satisfying, The Bridges of Madison County finds Clint Eastwood adapting a bestseller with heft, wit, and grace." On Metacritic, the film has a 69 out of 100 rating, based on 23 critics, indicating "generally favorable reviews". Audiences surveyed by CinemaScore gave the film a grade "A−" on scale of A+ to F.

According to Janet Maslin from The New York Times, "Clint Eastwood, director and alchemist, has transformed The Bridges of Madison County into something bearable—no, something even better. Limited by the vapidity of this material while he trims its excesses with the requisite machete, Eastwood locates a moving, elegiac love story at the heart of Mr. Waller's self-congratulatory overkill. The film has leanness and surprising decency, and Streep has her best role in years. Looking sturdy and voluptuous in her plain housedress (the year is 1965), she rises straight out of Christina's World to embody all the loneliness and fierce yearning Andrew Wyeth captured on canvas. And yet, despite the Iowa setting and the emphasis on down-home Americana, Eastwood's Bridges of Madison County has a European flavor. Its pace is unhurried, which is not the same as slow. It respects long silences and pays attention to small details. It sustains an austere tone and staves off weepiness until the last reel. It voices musings that would definitely sound better in French."

Richard Corliss from Time stated that Eastwood is the "most reticent of directors—where the book ogles, the film discreetly observes—and, here, the courtliest of stars...As scripted by Richard LaGravenese (The Fisher King), The Bridges of Madison County has a slightly riper theme than the book. It is about the anticipation and consequences of passion—the slow dance of appraisal, of waiting to make a move that won't be rejected, of debating what to do when the erotic heat matures into love light. What is the effect of an affair on a woman who has been faithful to her husband, and on a rootless man who only now realizes he needs the one woman he can have but not hold?" Corliss concludes "The Bridges of Madison County is Eastwood's gift to women: to Francesca, to all the girls he's loved before—and to Streep, who alchemizes literary mawkishness into intelligent movie passion."

=== Accolades ===
Award	Category	Nominee(s)	Result
Academy Awards	Best Actress	Meryl Streep	Nominated
American Society of Cinematographers Awards	Outstanding Achievement in Cinematography in Theatrical Releases	Jack N. Green	Nominated
ASCAP Film and Television Music Awards	Top Box Office Films	Clint Eastwood	Won
Blockbuster Entertainment Awards	Favorite Actress – Drama	Meryl Streep	Nominated
Blue Ribbon Awards	Best Foreign Film	Clint Eastwood	Won
BMI Film & TV Awards	Film Music Award	Lennie Niehaus	Won
Cahiers du Cinéma	Best Film	Clint Eastwood	4th place
Chicago Film Critics Association Awards	Best Director	Clint Eastwood	Nominated
Chicago Film Critics Association Awards	Best Actress	Meryl Streep	Nominated
César Awards	Best Foreign Film	The Bridges of Madison County	Nominated
Dallas-Fort Worth Film Critics Association Awards	Best Actress	Meryl Streep	Nominated
Fotogramas de Plata	Best Foreign Film	Clint Eastwood	Won
Golden Globe Awards	Best Motion Picture – Drama	The Bridges of Madison County	Nominated
Golden Globe Awards	Best Actress in a Motion Picture – Drama	Meryl Streep	Nominated
Kinema Junpo Awards	Best Foreign Language Film Director	Clint Eastwood	Won
Mainichi Film Awards	Best Foreign Language Film	Clint Eastwood	Won
National Society of Film Critics Awards	Best Actress	Meryl Streep	3rd Place
New York Film Critics Circle Awards	Best Actress	Meryl Streep	4th place
Sant Jordi Awards	Best Foreign Actress	Meryl Streep	Nominated
Actor Awards	Outstanding Performance by a Female Actor in a Leading Role	Meryl Streep	Nominated
Turkish Film Critics Association Awards	Best Foreign Film	The Bridges of Madison County	19th place

==== Others ====
The Bridges of Madison County tied with Goodbye South, Goodbye (1996) and Carlito's Way (1993) as the best film of the 1990s in a poll by Cahiers du Cinéma.

The film is recognized by American Film Institute in these lists:

- 2002: AFI's 100 Years...100 Passions – #90

== Bibliography ==
- Hughes, Howard (2009). Aim for the Heart: the Films of Clint Eastwood. London: I.B. Tauris. ISBN 978-1-84511-902-7.
