= Holliwell Covered Bridge =

- U.S. National Register of Historic Places
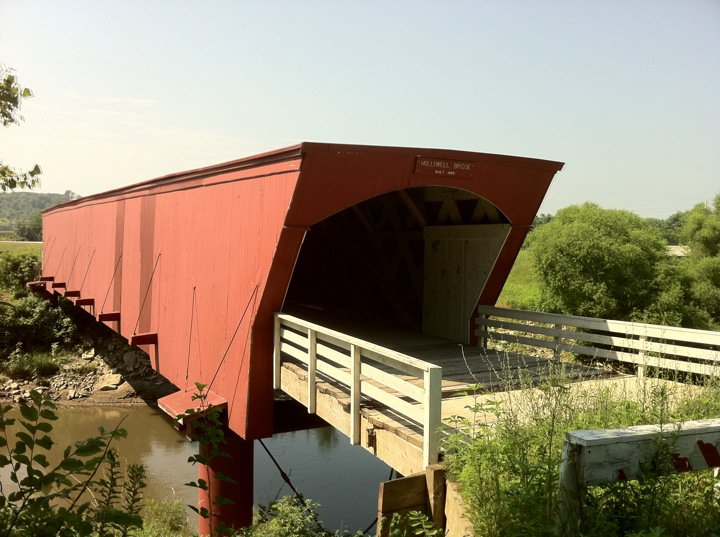
- Holliwell Covered Bridge

- Location within Iowa Location within the United States
- Nearest city: Winterset, Iowa
- Coordinates: 41°19′22″N 93°57′34″W
- Built: 1880
- Architect: H. P. Jones, G. K. Foster
- NRHP reference No.: 76000789
- Added to NRHP: August 28, 1976

Holliwell Bridge is a wooden covered bridge in Madison County, Iowa. It was built over the Middle River in 1880. The Holliwell Bridge is located two miles southeast of Winterset over the Middle River. Built by Harvey P. Jones and George K. Foster for a cost of $1,180, it is the longest of the six remaining covered bridges in Madison County, spanning 110 feet with a total length of 159 feet. It is also the longest remaining timber bridge in the state of Iowa.

The bridge is no longer in use, but was renovated and restored in 1995 at a cost of $225,000 ($475,000 today). It is featured in the film The Bridges of Madison County.

The Holliwell Bridge is in its original location but supporting abutments were often washed out by flooding, so the angle at which the bridge crossed Middle River has been changed. (Early county bridges were built on timber piles or stone masonry abutments, but in 1884, the county began purchasing large quantities of tubular piers from nationally-known bridge fabricating companies. According to county records, the Holliwell Bridge originally had timber pile piers.) The Holliwell now consists of a timber Town lattice truss with a superimposed arch, timber stringer approach spans, timber abutments and wingwalls with concrete-filled iron cylinder piers. Unlike the other covered bridges in the county which use the Town lattice truss, the Holliwell uses metal fasteners rather than wooden dowels and is reinforced with a flat arch and partial arches at each end.

The Holliwell was named after an adjacent landowner (sometimes spelled Halliwell in records).

According to local historian W. S. Wilkinson, “The first bridge in this county was built in the fall and winter of 1854-55 across Middle River where the Indianola and Winterset road crossed that stream in Scott Township now known as the Holliwell Bridge.” This first bridge was uncovered timber pile, which spanned forty feet with an approach span at each end, and cost $500 to build. That bridge washed away in a flood in 1876 and travelers resorted to fording the river for the next few years. On September 3, 1879, the Board of Supervisors appropriated funds to build a new bridge at “Holliwell’s Ford” and contracted with Harvey P. Jones (county bridge foreman) and George K. Foster to build a 110-foot timber truss on iron cylinder piers (what we now know of as the Holliwell Covered Bridge). Construction began in October of 1879 and continued through the winter months under the supervision of Jones. County records show payments to more than twenty individuals for labor on the bridge and to several companies and individuals for materials. Mrs. Holliwell was paid for boarding workers at the Holliwell farm. The bridge was completed in June of 1880.

The Holliwell Bridge was added to the National Register of Historic Places in 1976. The Holliwell Bridge carried traffic for over a century, until it was bypassed in 1986. It was one of the bridges featured in the movie The Bridges of Madison County. The Holliwell was renovated in 1995 for $225,000, made possible by a federal restoration grant.

== Photo gallery ==
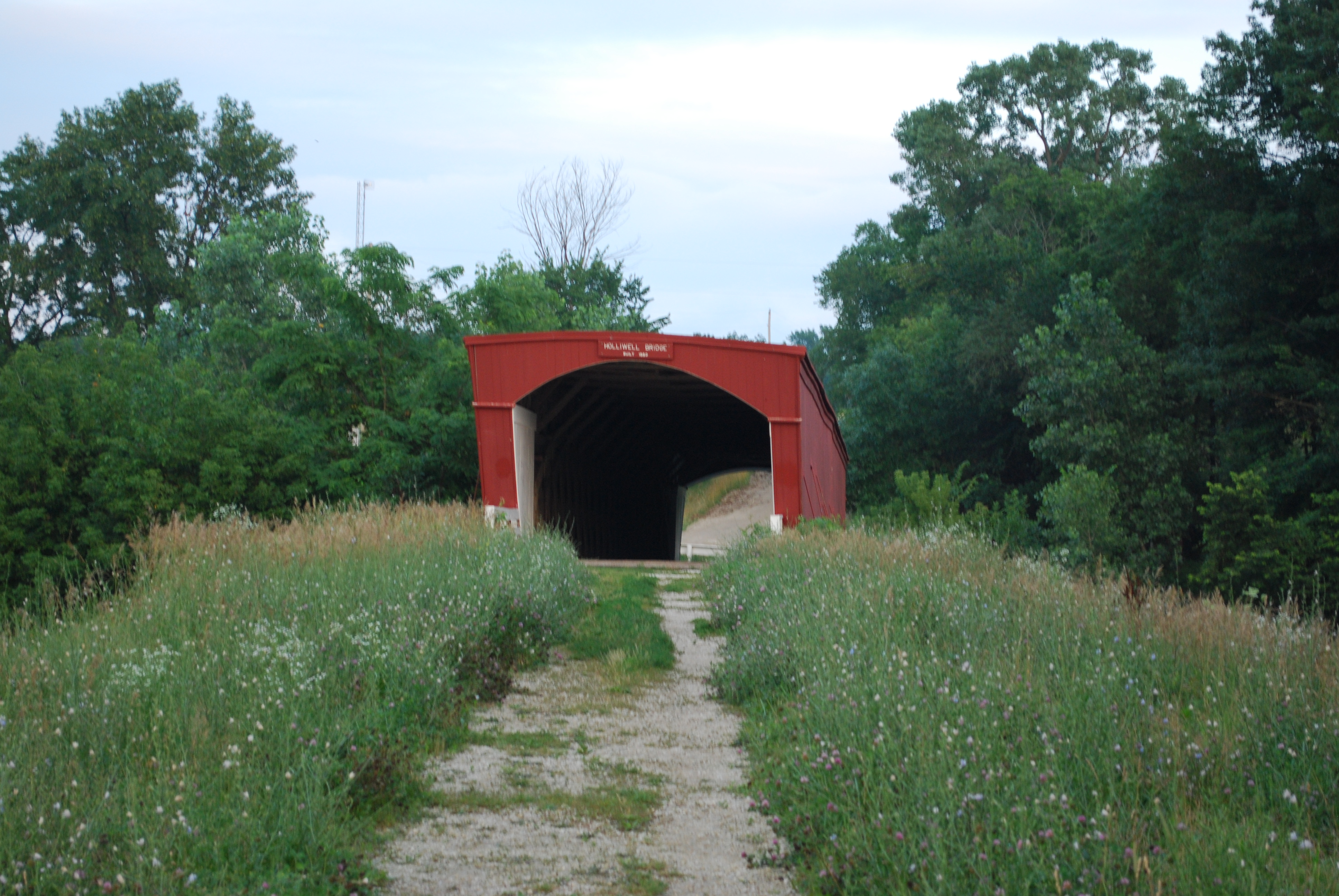
North end of the Holliwell Bridge

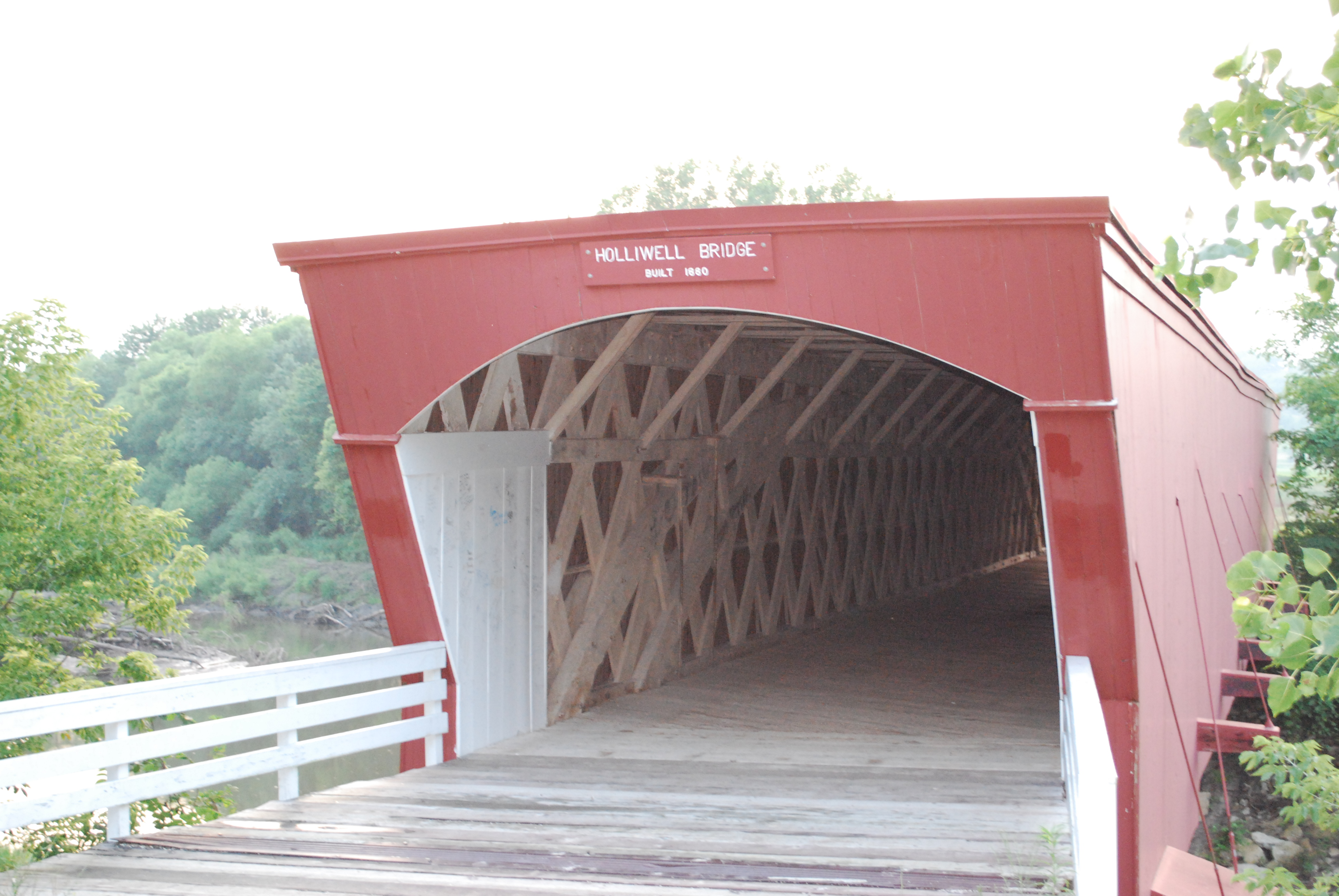
South end of the Holliwell Bridge

== See also ==
- List of bridges documented by the Historic American Engineering Record in Iowa
- List of covered bridges in Madison County, Iowa
