= North River (Iowa) =

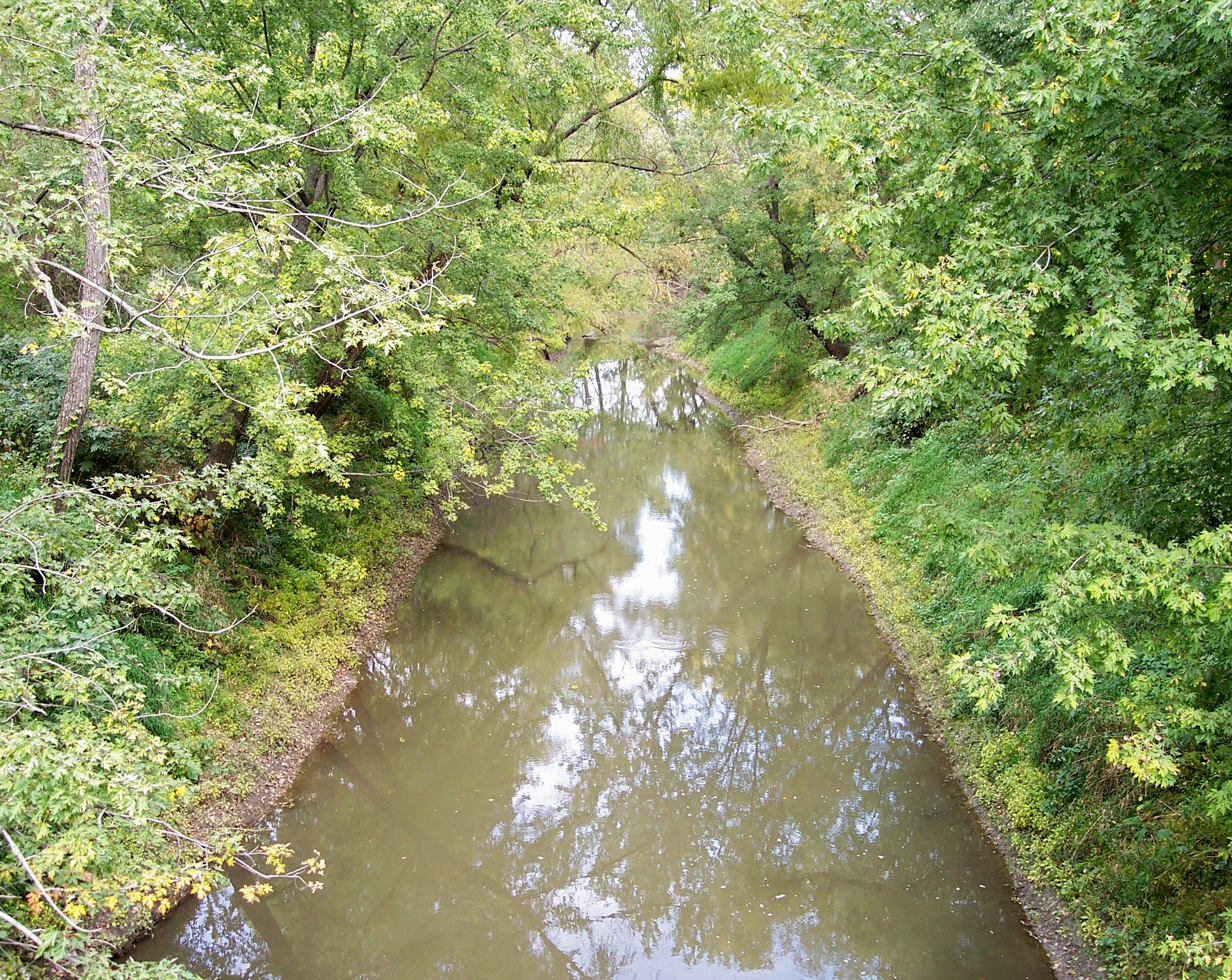
- The North River as viewed from a rural road in northwestern Warren County

Location
- Country: United States
- State: Iowa
- Counties: Polk, Warren, Madison, Adair, Guthrie

Physical characteristics
- Source
  - coordinates: 41.524°N 94.481°W
- Mouth: Des Moines River
  - coordinates: 41.515°N 93.447°W
  - elevation: 758 ft (231 m)
- Discharge
  - location: Norwalk, Iowa
  - average: 209 cu/ft. per sec.

The North River is a tributary of the Des Moines River in south-central Iowa in the United States. It is 103 miles (166 km) long and drains an area of 349.2 square miles (904 km^{2}). Via the Des Moines River, it is part of the watershed of the Mississippi River.

The North River rises northeast of Casey in southern Guthrie County and flows generally eastwardly through Adair, Madison and Warren counties, past Carlisle, into southeastern Polk County, where it joins the Des Moines River 10 miles (16 km) southeast of Des Moines.

In Madison County, it collects a short tributary known as the North Branch North River.

== See also ==
- List of Iowa rivers
