= Roseman Covered Bridge =

- U.S. National Register of Historic Places
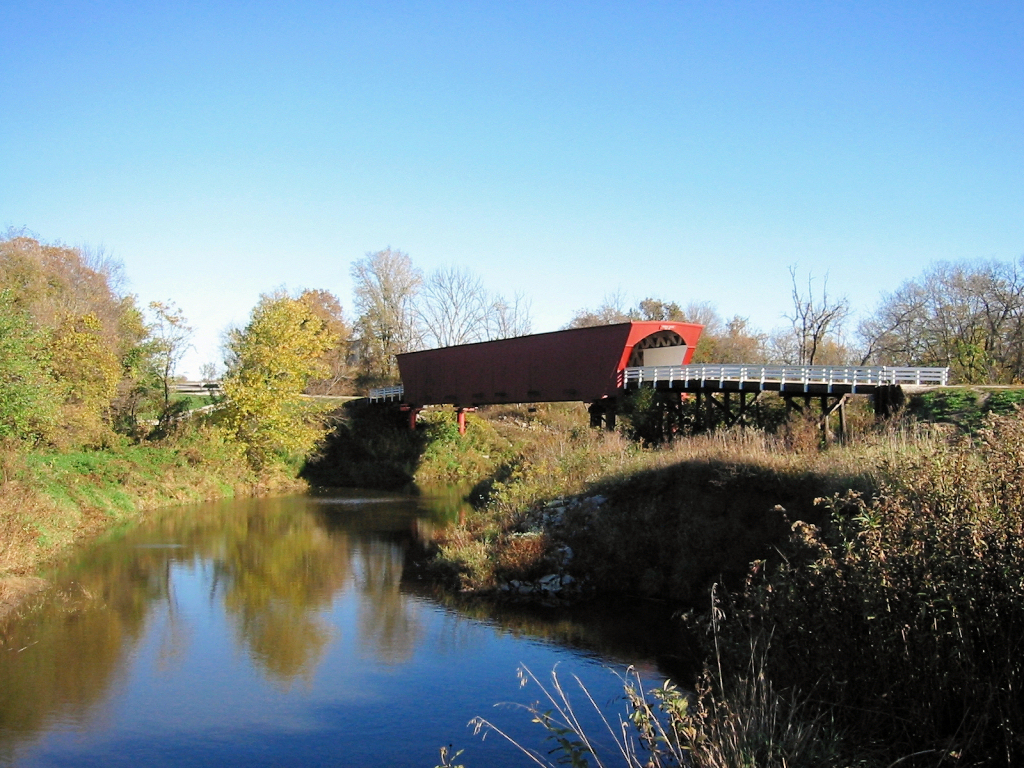
- Roseman Covered Bridge

- Location within Iowa Location within the United States
- Nearest city: Winterset, Iowa
- Coordinates: 41°17′34.04″N 94°8′59.1″W
- Area: less than one acre
- Built: 1883
- Built by: Jones, H. P.
- Architectural style: Town lattice
- NRHP reference No.: 76000792
- Added to NRHP: September 1, 1976

The Roseman Covered Bridge is a historic covered bridge in Winterset, Iowa. It is prominently featured in the novel The Bridges of Madison County, as well as its film adaptation. It was built in 1883 over the Middle River, and renovated in 1992. The Roseman Covered Bridge was added to the National Register of Historic Places in 1976.

== See also ==
- List of bridges documented by the Historic American Engineering Record in Iowa
- List of covered bridges in Madison County, Iowa
