= Robert James Waller =

American novelist

- Born: Robert James Waller Jr. August 1, 1939; Charles City, Iowa, U.S.
- Died: March 10, 2017 (aged 77); Fredericksburg, Texas, U.S.
- Education: University of Northern Iowa (BA, MA); Kelley School of Business (PhD)
- Occupations: Academic; educator; writer
- Notable work: The Bridges of Madison County
- Spouses: Georgia Ann Wiedemeier (m. 1961; div. 1997) Linda Bow (m. 2004)
- Children: 1

Robert James Waller (August 1, 1939 – March 10, 2017) was an American author best known for The Bridges of Madison County. He was also a professor, photographer, and musician.

== Biography ==
Robert James Waller Jr. was born in Charles City, Iowa, and grew up in Rockford, Iowa. In 1961, he married Georgia Ann Wiedemeier. Waller received his BA ('62) and MA ('64) from University of Northern Iowa (then known as Iowa State Teachers College). He received his PhD in business from the Kelley School of Business at Indiana University Bloomington in 1968.

Later that year, he returned to UNI and began teaching management and economics and in 1977 became a full professor. He became the founding dean of the Wilson College of Business in 1980 and retired from that position in 1986. In addition to his teaching and administrative duties, Waller was also the director of the university's International Business Institute.

In 1992, Waller published his first novel, The Bridges of Madison County. It became a New York Times bestseller, the top best-seller in 1993. Both that novel and his 1995 novel Puerto Vallarta Squeeze have been made into motion pictures.

In 1997, Waller and his wife, Georgia, divorced. Around that time, he began a relationship with Linda Bow, whom he married in 2004. An article in People Magazine commented on the divorce: "The parallels between Waller's life and his art—his Bridges heroine, farmwife Francesca, sacrifices her chance for happiness with a globe-hopping photographer in order to stay home and shield her loved ones from small-town scandal—haven't been lost on the locals."

Waller died on March 10, 2017, at his home in Fredericksburg, Texas. He was 77 and had been battling multiple myeloma.

== Works ==
=== Novels ===
- The Bridges of Madison County (1992; original UK title Love in Black and White); ISBN 0-446-51652-X
- Slow Waltz in Cedar Bend (1993); ISBN 0-446-51653-8
- Puerto Vallarta Squeeze (1995); ISBN 0-446-51747-X
- Border Music (1995)
- A Thousand Country Roads: An Epilogue to The Bridges of Madison County (2002); ISBN 0-9717667-1-1
- High Plains Tango (2005)
- The Long Night of Winchell Dear (2007)

=== Collections ===
- Just Beyond the Firelight (1988), Iowa State University Press; 1st edition (1988), ISBN 081380163X/ISBN 978-0813801636

=== Non-fiction ===
- One Good Road Is Enough (1990)
- Iowa: Perspectives on Today and Tomorrow (1991)
- Old Songs in a New Café (1994)
- Images (1994)
- The Summer Nights Never End... Until They Do: Life, Liberty, and the Lure of the Short-Run (2012)

=== Music ===
- The Ballads of Madison County: a Collection of Songs; Audio CD (July 23, 1993); Atlantic Records 82511.
