= The Bridges of Madison County =

1992 novel by Robert James Waller

- First edition
- Author: Robert James Waller
- Language: English
- Publisher: Warner Books, Inc.
- Publication date: 1992
- Publication place: United States
- Media type: Print (hardback & paperback)
- Pages: 192 pp
- ISBN: 0-446-51652-X
- OCLC: 24246926
- Dewey Decimal: 813/.54 20
- LC Class: PS3573.A4347 B75 1992
- Followed by: A Thousand Country Roads

The Bridges of Madison County (also published as Love in Black and White) is a 1992 best-selling romance novel by American writer Robert James Waller that tells the story of an Italian-American World War II war bride living on a farm in 1960s Madison County, Iowa. While her husband and children are away at the State Fair, she engages in an affair with a National Geographic photographer from Bellingham, Washington, who is visiting Madison County to create a photographic essay on the covered bridges in the area. The novel is presented as a novelization of a true story, but it is in fact entirely fictional.

The novel is one of the bestselling books of the 20th century, with 50 million copies sold worldwide. It was adapted into a feature film in 1995 and a musical in 2013.

== Background ==
Without expecting to, Robert James Waller conceived of The Bridges of Madison County in the early 1990s. On leave from his teaching job at the University of Northern Iowa, Waller was photographing the Mississippi River with a friend when he decided to photograph the covered bridges of Madison County, Iowa. This event, alongside a song Waller wrote years earlier about "the dreams of a woman named Francesca", gave him the idea for the novel, which he completed in eleven days. After he had written The Bridges of Madison County, Waller came to believe that he had based the character of Francesca Johnson on his wife, Georgia, whom Francesca physically resembles.

== Analysis ==
According to Marc Eliot, Waller's novel is a modernization of the Noël Coward play Still Life (1934), which was adapted into David Lean's film Brief Encounter (1945). Still Life is about "the desperation, guilt, and temptations of two married people who meet, fall in love, commit adultery, and then separate forever". In The New York Times, Brigitte Weeks said that The Bridges of Madison County had appealed to "middle-aged, world-weary people" in a manner similar to the writings of James A. Michener, though it features more sexuality than Michener's books. The Bridges of Madison County received multiple comparisons to Erich Segal's Love Story (1970) for its plot and prose. For Rolling Stone, Peter Travers said that Waller's prose was modeled on Walt Whitman's work, but instead resembled a greeting card. Travers also said that The Bridges of Madison County exists within a tradition of "great romantic crocks" like Pat Conroy's The Prince of Tides (1986). The New York Times Magazine found the novel's prose comparable to that of Jonathan Livingston Seagull (1970) by Richard Bach. The Independent's Nicolette Jones found the novel reminiscent of the books published by Mills & Boon, while Owen Gleiberman found it more similar to an anecdote than to a regular narrative.

== Reception ==
Orlando Sentinel Publishers Weekly found The Bridges of Madison County "Quietly powerful and thoroughly credible". L.S. Klepp of Entertainment Weekly called The Bridges of Madison County "a short, poignant story, moving precisely because it has the ragged edges of reality". Roger Ebert of the Chicago Sun-Times praised the novel's "compelling" story for "elevating to a spiritual level the common fantasy, in which a virile stranger materializes in the kitchen of a quiet housewife and takes her into his arms." The book debuted on the New York Times bestseller list in August 1992 and slowly climbed to number 1, and remained on the list for over three years (164 consecutive weeks), through October 8, 1995.

== Film adaptation ==
The Bridges of Madison County was made into a 1995 film of the same name, adapted by Richard LaGravenese and directed by Clint Eastwood. It stars Eastwood and Meryl Streep.

== Musical adaptation ==
The Bridges of Madison County was adapted into a Tony Award-winning musical with music and lyrics by Jason Robert Brown and the book by Marsha Norman, premiering at the 2013 Williamstown Theatre Festival. Directed by Bartlett Sher, the cast featured Elena Shaddow and Steven Pasquale as Francesca and Robert Kincaid respectively. The musical began previews on Broadway at the Gerald Schoenfeld Theatre on January 17, 2014 and officially opened on February 20, 2014 with Kelli O'Hara as Francesca Kincaid and Steven Pasquale reprising his role. Directed by Bartlett Sher, the sets are by Michael Yeargan, costumes by Catherine Zuber, and lighting by Donald Holder. Hunter Foster played the role of Bud Johnson, the husband of Francesca. It closed in May of the same year after 100 performances.

== Theatre ==
In 2018, the Argentine theatrical director Luis "Indio" Romero directed actors Facundo Arana and Araceli González in a Spanish version of the work.

== Bibliography ==
- Eliot, Marc (2009), American Rebel: The Life of Clint Eastwood, New York: Harmony Books, ISBN 978-0-307-33688-0
