= List of bridges documented by the Historic American Engineering Record in Iowa =

This is a list of bridges documented by the Historic American Engineering Record in the US state of Iowa.

== Bridges ==
Survey No.	Name (as assigned by HAER)	Status	Type	Built	Documented	Carries	Crosses	Location	County	Coordinates
IA-1	Pacific Shortline Bridge	Replaced	Rim-bearing swing span	1896	1980	US 77	Missouri River	Sioux City, Iowa, and South Sioux City, Nebraska	Woodbury County, Iowa, and Dakota County, Nebraska	42°29′15″N 96°24′49″W
IA-2	Eagle Point Bridge	Replaced	Pennsylvania truss	1902	1982	US 61 / US 151	Mississippi River	Dubuque, Iowa, and Hazel Green, Wisconsin	Dubuque County, Iowa, and Grant County, Wisconsin	42°32′13″N 90°38′38″W
IA-3	Keokuk and Hamilton Bridge	Extant	Swing span	1916	1982	Keokuk Junction Railway	Mississippi River	Keokuk, Iowa, and Hamilton, Illinois	Lee County, Iowa, and Hancock County, Illinois	40°23′28″N 91°22′24″W
IA-4	Marsh Rainbow Arch Bridge	Replaced	Reinforced concrete through arch	1927	1980	West 8th Street North	Chicago, Rock Island and Pacific Railroad	Newton	Jasper	41°42′06″N 93°03′46″W
IA-5	Boyleston Bridge	Replaced	Parker truss	1897	1985	CR W75	Skunk River	Lowell	Henry	40°50′24″N 91°30′07″W
IA-6	Sutliff's Ferry Bridge	Abandoned	Parker truss	1898	1982	Sutliff Road	Cedar River	Solon	Johnson	41°50′23″N 91°23′33″W
IA-7	Mill Rock Bridge	Replaced	Pratt truss	1913	1983	CR Y34	Bear Creek	Monmouth	Jackson	42°03′44″N 90°50′25″W
IA-8	South Third Avenue Bridge	Replaced	Reinforced concrete through arch	1920	1979	Iowa 14 (South Third Avenue)	Linn Creek	Marshalltown	Marshall	42°02′27″N 92°54′29″W
IA-9	Traer Street Bridge	Replaced	Pennsylvania truss	1903	1980	Traer Street	Shell Rock River	Greene	Butler	42°53′43″N 92°48′10″W
IA-10	Eureka Bridge	Relocated	Bowstring arch truss	1872	1983	City Park path	Man-made depression	Castalia	Winneshiek	43°06′27″N 91°40′23″W
IA-11	Taylor Bridge	Replaced	Reinforced concrete through arch	1924	1983	US 18 Bus.	Winnebago River	Mason City	Cerro Gordo	43°08′53″N 93°09′44″W
IA-15	Melan Arch Bridge (Note: See also HAER No. IA-89, "Structural Study of Reinforced Concrete Arch Bridges" for additional documentation)	Relocated	Reinforced concrete closed-spandrel arch	1893	1995	Emma Sater Park path	Man-made depression	Rock Rapids	Lyon	43°25′57″N 96°09′15″W
IA-17	Open Spandrel Bridge	Replaced	Reinforced concrete open-spandrel arch	1919	1985	Hawkeye Avenue	Des Moines River	Fort Dodge	Webster	42°30′46″N 94°12′13″W
IA-18	Lower Plymouth Rock Bridge	Replaced	Bowstring arch truss	1877	1985	Cold Water Creek Road	Upper Iowa River	Kendallville	Winneshiek	43°25′54″N 91°59′50″W
IA-19	Freeport Bridge (Note: See also HAER No. IA-90, "Structural Study of Iron Bowstring Bridges" for additional documentation)	Relocated	Bowstring arch truss	1878	1985	Clay Hill Road	Upper Iowa River	Decorah	Winneshiek	43°18′19″N 91°44′33″W
IA-20	Burlington Bridge (Note: See also HAER No. NE-2, "Nebraska City Bridge" for additional documentation)	Replaced	Swing span	1893	1985	BNSF Railway	Mississippi River	Burlington, Iowa, and Gulfport, Illinois	Des Moines County, Iowa, and Henderson County, Illinois	40°47′55″N 91°05′31″W
IA-21	MacArthur Bridge	Replaced	Cantilever	1917	1987	US 34	Mississippi River	Burlington, Iowa, and Gulfport, Illinois	Des Moines County, Iowa, and Henderson County, Illinois	40°48′43″N 91°05′44″W
IA-29	Rock Valley Bridge	Replaced	Reinforced concrete through arch	1918	1988	US 30	North Timber Creek	Marshall	Marshall	42°00′31″N 92°51′07″W
IA-30	Benton Street Bridge	Replaced	Steel built-up girder	1949	1989	Benton Street	Iowa River	Iowa City	Johnson	41°39′02″N 91°32′20″W
IA-31	Cottonville Bridge	Replaced	Bowstring arch truss	1946	1990	CR D61	Farmers Creek tributary	Maquoketa	Jackson	42°14′18″N 90°37′33″W
IA-32	Supple Ford Bridge	Replaced	Bowstring arch truss	1875	1990	Temple Hill Road	Maquoketa River south fork	Clay Mills	Jones	42°11′08″N 90°58′39″W
IA-35	Davis Bridge	Replaced	Bowstring arch truss	1879	1991	CR 16	Upper Iowa River	Lime Springs	Howard	43°28′00″N 92°17′52″W
IA-36	Sixth Street Viaduct	Replaced	Pratt truss	1886	1991	Sixth Street	Burlington Northern Railroad	Burlington	Des Moines	40°48′33″N 91°06′24″W
IA-37	Bevington Bridge	Replaced	Pratt truss	1882	1992	Warren Street	Middle River	Bevington	Madison	41°21′33″N 93°47′25″W
IA-38	Waverly Junction Bridge	Replaced	Parker truss	1911	1991	Country Road	Shell Rock River	Waverly	Bremer	42°39′56″N 92°30′45″W
IA-39	Honey Creek Bridge	Replaced	Reinforced concrete girder	1910	1992	105th Street	Honey Creek	Bangor	Marshall	42°12′05″N 93°05′56″W
IA-40	Okoboji Bridge	Relocated	Reinforced concrete girder	1929	1992	US 71	Strait between East and West Okoboji Lake	Okoboji	Dickinson	43°22′37″N 95°07′40″W
IA-42	86th Street Overpass	Replaced	Aluminum built-up girder	1958	1992	Northwest 86th Street	I-35 / I-80	Urbandale	Polk	41°39′08″N 93°44′11″W
IA-43	Black Hawk Bridge	Extant	Cantilever	1931	1995	Iowa 9/ WIS 82	Mississippi River	Lansing, Iowa, and De Soto, Wisconsin	Allamakee County, Iowa, and Crawford County, Wisconsin	43°21′55″N 91°12′52″W
IA-44	Chicago & Northwestern Railroad Viaduct	Bypassed	Viaduct	1901	1995	Chicago and North Western Railway	Des Moines River	Boone	Boone	42°03′35″N 93°58′08″W
IA-45	Wagon Bridge	Demolished	Pennsylvania truss	1910	1995	200th Street	Des Moines River	Boone	Boone	42°03′46″N 93°58′10″W
IA-46	Lake City Bridge	Bypassed	Reinforced concrete through arch	1914	1995	Rainbow Bend County Park trail	Raccoon River	Lake City	Calhoun	42°13′46″N 94°45′16″W
IA-47	Elkader Bridge	Extant	Stone arch	1889	1995	Bridge Street	Turkey River	Elkader	Clayton	42°51′18″N 91°24′13″W
IA-48	Nishnabotna River Bridge	Extant	Bowstring arch truss	1945	1995	310th Street	Nishnabotna River	Manilla	Crawford	41°52′02″N 95°16′01″W
IA-49	Euritt Bridge	Abandoned	Pratt truss	1882	1995	River Road	Grand River	Leon	Decatur	40°43′18″N 93°52′33″W
IA-50	Cascade Bridge	Abandoned	Baltimore truss	1896	1995	South Main Street	Cascade Ravine	Burlington	Des Moines	40°46′53″N 91°05′55″W
IA-51	White Water Creek Bridge	Relocated	Pratt truss	1872	1995	Bergfeld Pond Trail	Bergfeld Pond	Bernard	Dubuque	42°29′21″N 90°46′33″W
IA-52	Ellsworth Ranch Bridge	Extant	Pratt truss	1895	1995	130th Street	Des Moines River east fork	Dolliver	Emmet	43°27′36″N 94°34′49″W
IA-53	Twin Bridge	Extant	Reinforced concrete closed-spandrel arch	1910	1995	130th Street	Little Volga River	Fayette	Fayette	42°49′4″N 91°52′41″W
IA-54	Dietzenbach Bottom Bridge	Bypassed	Warren truss	1891	1995	Pheasant Road	Turkey River	Saint Lucas	Fayette	43°04′39″N 91°53′21″W
IA-55	West Auburn Bridge	Bypassed	Whipple truss	1881	1995	Neon Road	Turkey River	West Union	Fayette	43°00′58″N 91°52′43″W
IA-56	Alden Bridge	Extant	Reinforced concrete rigid frame	1936	1995	Main Street	Iowa River	Alden	Hardin	42°31′16″N 93°22′32″W
IA-57	Hardin City Bridge	Relocated	Whipple truss	1879	1995	170th Street	Iowa River	Steamboat Rock	Hardin	42°26′55″N 93°06′34″W
IA-58	Fremont Mill Bridge	Relocated	Bowstring arch truss	1873	1995	Central Park trail	Central Park Lake	Anamosa	Jones	42°06′38″N 91°08′26″W
IA-59	Hale Bridge	Relocated	Bowstring arch truss	1879	1995	Wapsipinicon State Park trail	Wapsipinicon River	Oxford Junction	Jones	42°05′34″N 91°16′29″W
IA-60	Corbett's Mill Bridge	Bypassed	Bowstring arch truss	1871	1995	Abandoned road	Maquoketa River	Scotch Grove	Jones	42°12′00″N 91°03′34″W
IA-61	Bridgeport Bridge	Bypassed	Pennsylvania truss	1904	1995	Abandoned road	Skunk River	Denmark	Lee and Des Moines	40°47′25″N 91°21′50″W
IA-62	Fort Madison Bridge	Extant	Swing span	1927	1995	Iowa 2/ IL 9	Mississippi River	Fort Madison, Iowa, and Niota, Illinois	Lee County, Iowa, and Hancock County, Illinois	40°37′37″N 91°17′45″W
IA-64	Holliwell Bridge	Bypassed	Lattice truss	1880	1995	Holliwell Bridge Road	Middle River	Winterset	Madison	41°19′22″N 93°57′34″W
IA-65	Eveland Bridge	Abandoned	Whipple truss	1887	1995	285th Street	Des Moines River	Oskaloosa	Mahaska	41°14′34″N 92°45′23″W
IA-66	Middle Creek Bridge	Abandoned	Pratt truss	1898	1995	Ventura Road	Middle Creek	Rose Hill	Mahaska	41°20′24″N 92°27′50″W
IA-67; NE-5	Plattsmouth Bridge	Bypassed	Cantilever	1929	1995	US 34	Missouri River	Pacific Junction, Iowa, and Plattsmouth, Nebraska	Mills County, Iowa, and Cass County, Nebraska	41°00′04″N 95°52′00″W
IA-68	Nodaway River Bridge	Relocated	Bowstring arch truss	1876	1995	Pilot Grove County Park trail	Pilot Grove County Park pond	Grant	Montgomery	41°08′46″N 95°02′34″W
IA-69	Pine Mill Bridge	Extant	Pratt truss	1878	1995	Wildcat Den State Park trail	Pine Creek	Muscatine	Muscatine	41°28′03″N 90°52′02″W
IA-70	Court Avenue Bridge	Extant	Reinforced concrete open-spandrel arch	1918	1995	Court Avenue	Des Moines River	Des Moines	Polk	41°35′09″N 93°37′03″W
IA-71	Southwest Fifth Street Bridge	Extant	Pratt truss	1898	1995	Southwest 5th Street	Raccoon River	Des Moines	Polk	41°34′37″N 93°37′10″W
IA-72	McDowell Bridge	Demolished	Bowstring arch truss	1883	1995	Abandoned road	North Skunk River	Montezuma	Poweshiek	41°31′14″N 92°40′34″W
IA-73	Centennial Bridge	Extant	Steel arch	1940	1995	US 67	Mississippi River	Davenport, Iowa, and Rock Island, Illinois	Scott County, Iowa, and Rock Island County, Illinois	41°30′54″N 90°34′54″W
IA-74	Keigley Branch Bridge	Extant	Reinforced concrete closed-spandrel arch	1913	1995	550th Street	Keigley Branch	Gilbert	Story	42°08′13″N 93°36′04″W
IA-75	Lincoln Highway Bridge	Extant	Reinforced concrete cast-in-place slab	1914	1995	US 30 (East 5th Street)	Mud Creek	Tama	Tama	41°57′50″N 92°33′44″W
IA-76	Red Bridge	Extant	Pratt truss	1920	1996	Abandoned road	Yellow River	Postville	Allamakee	43°07′51″N 91°25′29″W
IA-77	Wapsipinicon River Bridge	Extant	Reinforced concrete closed-spandrel arch	1927	1996	Iowa 150	Wapsipinicon River	Independence	Buchanan	42°27′33″N 91°53′27″W
IA-78	Winnebago River Bridge	Extant	Reinforced concrete girder	1926	1996	US 65 northbound	Winnebago River	Mason City	Cerro Gordo	43°11′35″N 93°12′36″W
IA-79	Mederville Bridge	Bypassed	Reinforced concrete open-spandrel arch	1918	1996	Eclipse Road	Volga River	Mederville	Clayton	42°45′49″N 91°25′18″W
IA-80	Cedar River Bridge	Extant	Steel built-up girder	1936	1996	River Road	Cedar River	Floyd	Floyd	43°12′25″N 92°47′34″W
IA-81	Illinois Central Railroad Overpass	Extant	Steel built-up girder	1932	1996	Iowa 57	Illinois Central Railroad	Ackley	Hardin	42°33′24″N 93°02′49″W
IA-82	Wapsipinicon River Bridge	Bypassed	Pratt truss	1887	1996	US 151	Wapsipinicon River	Anamosa	Jones	42°06′04″N 91°17′31″W
IA-83	Upper Paris Bridge	Extant	Whipple truss	1879	1996	Sutton Road	Wapsipinicon River	Paris	Linn	42°14′40″N 91°35′04″W
IA-84	Southeast Fourteenth Street Bridge	Extant	Steel built-up girder	1937	1996	US 65 / US 69 (Southeast 14th Street)	Des Moines River	Des Moines	Polk	41°34′32″N 93°35′49″W
IA-85	Kilbourn Bridge	Extant	Pratt truss	1909	1996	Lark Avenue	Des Moines River	Kilbourn	Van Buren	40°47′59″N 91°58′14″W
IA-86	Jefferson Street Viaduct	Extant	Warren truss	1936	1996	US 34 / US 63 (Jefferson Street)	Des Moines River	Ottumwa	Wapello	41°00′48″N 92°24′44″W
IA-87	Grand Avenue Viaduct	Extant	Viaduct	1936	1996	US 20 Bus. / Iowa 12 (Gordon Drive)	Chicago and North Western Railroad	Sioux City	Woodbury	42°29′23″N 96°23′31″W
IA-88	Historical Overview of Iowa Bridges				1996			Ames	Story	
IA-89	Structural Study of Reinforced Concrete Arch Bridges		Reinforced concrete closed-spandrel arch		1996	Structural analyses of Melan Arch Bridge, etc.		Ames	Story	
IA-90	Structural Study of Iron Bowstring Bridges		Bowstring arch truss		1996	Structural analyses of Fremont Mill Bridge, etc.		Ames	Story	
IA-92	Cutler Bridge	Relocated	Lattice truss	1871	2002	Winterset City Park trail	Middle River tributary	Winterset	Madison	41°19′52″N 94°00′17″W
IA-93	Hogback Bridge	Bypassed	Lattice truss	1884	2002	Hogback Bridge Road	North River	Winterset	Madison	41°23′11″N 94°02′51″W
IA-94	Imes Bridge	Relocated	Lattice truss	1870	2002	CR G50 trail	Man-made depression	St. Charles	Madison	41°17′21″N 93°48′03″W
IA-95	Roseman Bridge	Extant	Lattice truss	1883	2002	CR G47	Middle River	Winterset	Madison	41°17′34″N 94°08′59″W
IA-96; SD-1	Sioux City Bridge	Replaced	Whipple truss	1888	1986	Chicago and North Western Railway	Missouri River	Sioux City, Iowa, and South Sioux City, Nebraska	Woodbury County, Iowa, and Dakota County, Nebraska	42°28′28″N 96°23′10″W
IA-97	Ebys Mill Road Bridge	Replaced	Reinforced concrete girder	1964	2014	CR X73 (Ebys Mill Road)	Small Creek	Ebys Mill	Jones	42°11′56″N 91°02′48″W
IA-98	Bridge 23780	Replaced	Prestressed concrete box beam	1958	2014	US 20 westbound	Maquoketa River north fork	Dyersville	Dubuque	42°28′14″N 91°07′29″W
IA-99	Bridge 33470	Replaced	Steel built-up girder	1953	2014	US 30 eastbound	Cedar River	Cedar Rapids	Linn	41°55′33″N 91°33′03″W
IL-20-P	Rock Island Arsenal, Rock Island Bridge	Extant	Swing span	1896	1985		Mississippi River	Davenport, Iowa, and Rock Island, Illinois	Scott County, Iowa, and Rock Island County, Illinois	41°31′09″N 90°34′01″W
NE-1	Abraham Lincoln Memorial Bridge	Replaced	Pennsylvania truss	1929	1987	US 30	Missouri River	California Junction, Iowa, and Blair, Nebraska	Harrison County, Iowa, and Washington County, Nebraska	41°33′04″N 96°05′44″W
NE-2	Nebraska City Bridge	Demolished	Whipple truss	1888	1986	Chicago, Burlington and Quincy Railroad	Missouri River	Percival, Iowa, and Nebraska City, Nebraska	Fremont County, Iowa, and Otoe County, Nebraska	40°40′27″N 95°50′14″W
NE-6	Omaha Bridge	Replaced	Whipple truss	1887	1986	Union Pacific Railroad	Missouri River	Council Bluffs, Iowa, and Omaha, Nebraska	Pottawattamie County, Iowa, and Douglas County, Nebraska	41°14′59″N 95°55′02″W
NE-7	Blair Crossing Bridge	Replaced	Whipple truss	1883	1986	Union Pacific Railroad	Missouri River	California Junction, Iowa, and Blair, Nebraska	Harrison County, Iowa, and Washington County, Nebraska	41°33′5″N 96°05′44″W
