= Sixth Avenue Bridge =

- Coordinates: 40.9342°N 74.1667°W
- Carries: CR 652 (North Sixth Street)
- Crosses: Passaic River
- Locale: Paterson and Prospect Park, New Jersey
- Other name: North Sixth Street Bridge
- Owner: Passaic County
- Maintained by: County
- ID number: 1600012

Characteristics
- Design: pony truss
- Material: Steel
- Total length: 299.9 feet (91.4 m)
- Width: 23.6 feet (7.2 m)
- Longest span: 85.0 feet (25.9 m)
- No. of spans: 3
- Clearance above: 13.7 feet (4.2 m)

History
- Construction end: 1905; 1987 rehab

Location
- Interactive map of Sixth Avenue Bridge

Sixth Avenue Bridge, a.k.a. the North Sixth Street Bridge, is a pony truss vehicular bridge over the Passaic River in northeastern New Jersey. It connects the Bunker Hill neighbourhood of Paterson and Prospect Park at the border with Hawthorne via North Sixth Street (CR 652). It was originally constructed 1907 as a steel structure supported on stone masonry piers and abutments and is one of several bridges built after the Passaic Flood of 1903. The older span opened was abruptly closed in 1986 after the Passaic County engineer at the time, Gaetano Fabrina, found that some steel beams had rusted and were "banging and clanging."

In 1987, the crossing was rebuilt with temporary components which have since deteriorated. The simple panel steel-truss structure, cost $850,000 and was built in less than a year to build by the Acrow Corporation of Carlstadt. In 2015, the North Jersey Transportation Planning Authority granted funds to study the bridges eventual restoration or replacement.

== See also ==
- Arch Street Bridge
- Straight Street Bridge
- West Broadway Bridge
- List of crossings of the Upper Passaic River
- List of crossings of the Lower Passaic River
- List of crossings of the Hackensack River
- Passaic River Flood Tunnel
