= West Auburn Bridge =

- U.S. National Register of Historic Places
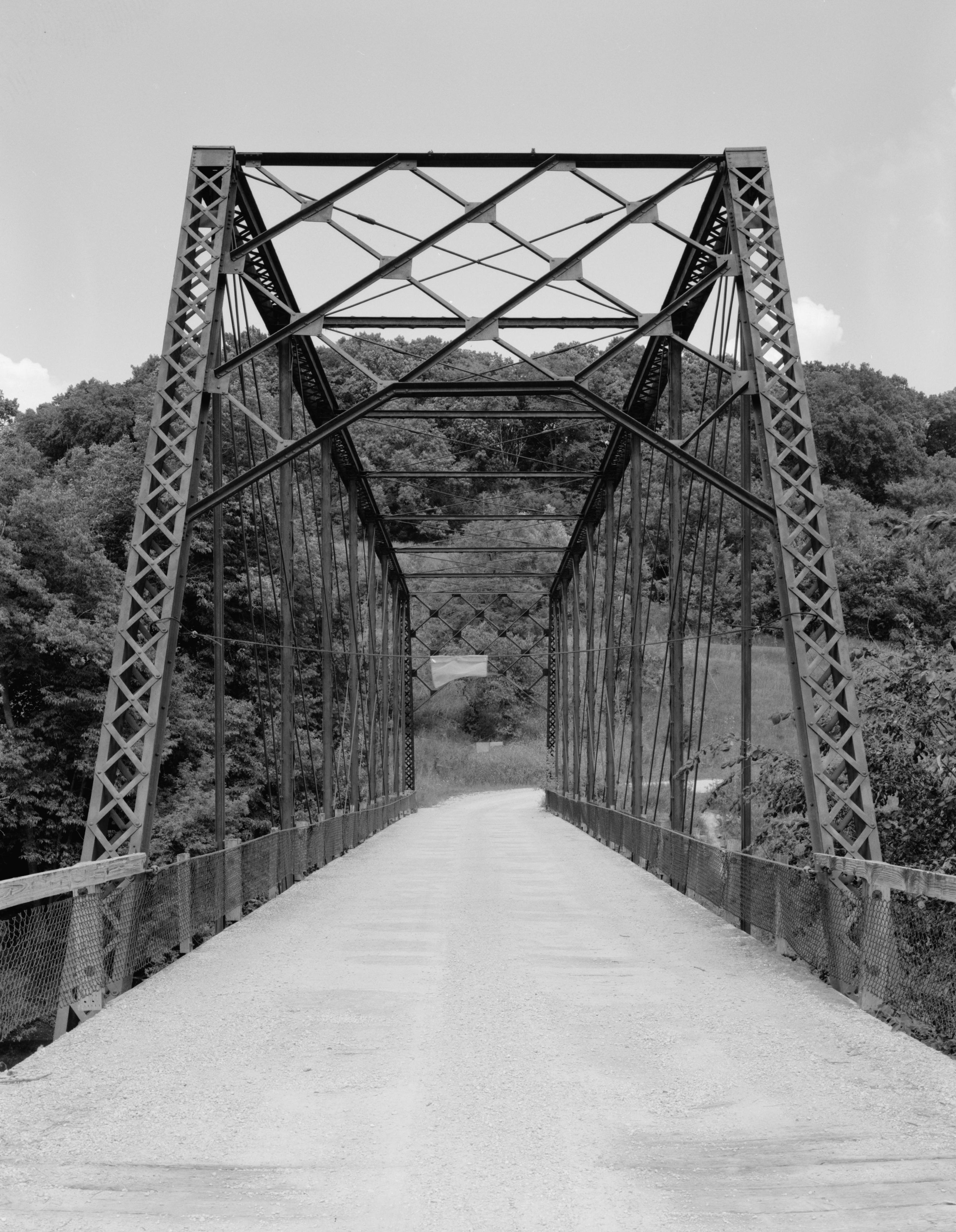

- Location within Iowa Location within the United States
- Location: Near Neon Road over the Turkey River
- Nearest city: West Union, Iowa
- Coordinates: 43°0′58.5″N 91°52′43″W
- Built: 1880-1881
- Built by: Horace E. Horton
- Architectural style: Whipple through truss
- MPS: Highway Bridges of Iowa MPS
- NRHP reference No.: 98000786
- Added to NRHP: June 25, 1998

West Auburn Bridge is a historic structure located northwest of West Union, Iowa, United States. It spans the Turkey River for 181 feet (55 m). In 1880 the Fayette County Board of Supervisors contracted with Minneapolis engineer Horace E. Horton to design and build this bridge. The Whipple through truss bridge was completed for $7,598.79. At the time of its nomination it was one of only eight bridges of this design known to exist in Iowa. The West Auburn Bridge was listed on the National Register of Historic Places in 1998.

== See also ==
- List of bridges documented by the Historic American Engineering Record in Iowa
