= Mill Race Bridge =

- U.S. National Register of Historic Places
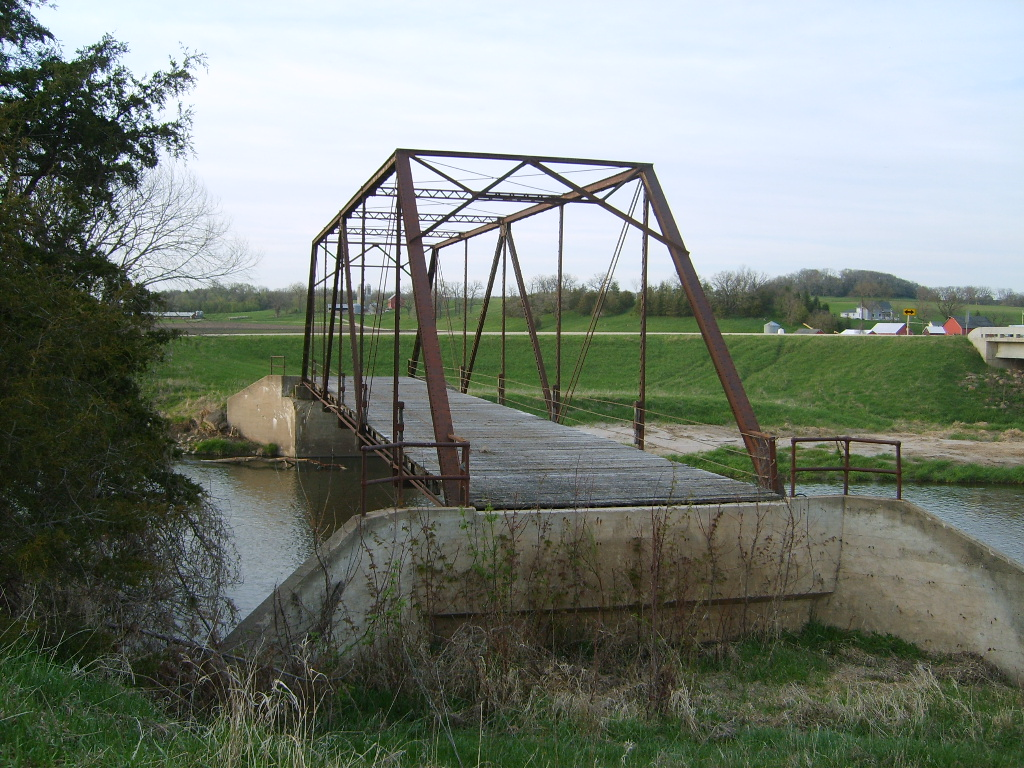

- Location within Iowa Location within the United States
- Location: Pheasant Road over the Turkey River
- Nearest city: Eldorado, Iowa
- Coordinates: 43°04′39″N 91°53′20.6″W
- Built: 1892
- Built by: Chicago Bridge & Iron Company
- Architect: Horace E. Horton
- Architectural style: Warren through truss
- MPS: Highway Bridges of Iowa MPS
- NRHP reference No.: 98000784
- Added to NRHP: June 25, 1998

Mill Race Bridge is a historic structure located northwest of Eldorado, Iowa, United States. It spans the Turkey River for 120 feet (37 m). Its name is derived from its location near a riverside mill. Horace E. Horton, a civil engineer from Minneapolis, had designed wagon bridges for Fayette County in the 1880s. When he joined the Chicago Bridge & Iron Company late in the decade, he took the county with him as a client. Chicago Bridge & Iron was responsible for providing the county's bridges in the 1890s. This bridge was completed about 1892. Its current concrete abutments are not original. While it remains in its original location, the roadway was redirected and a modern bridge was constructed 130 feet to the East. The Mill Race Bridge was listed on the National Register of Historic Places in 1998.

== See also ==
- List of bridges documented by the Historic American Engineering Record in Iowa
