= Arch Street Bridge =

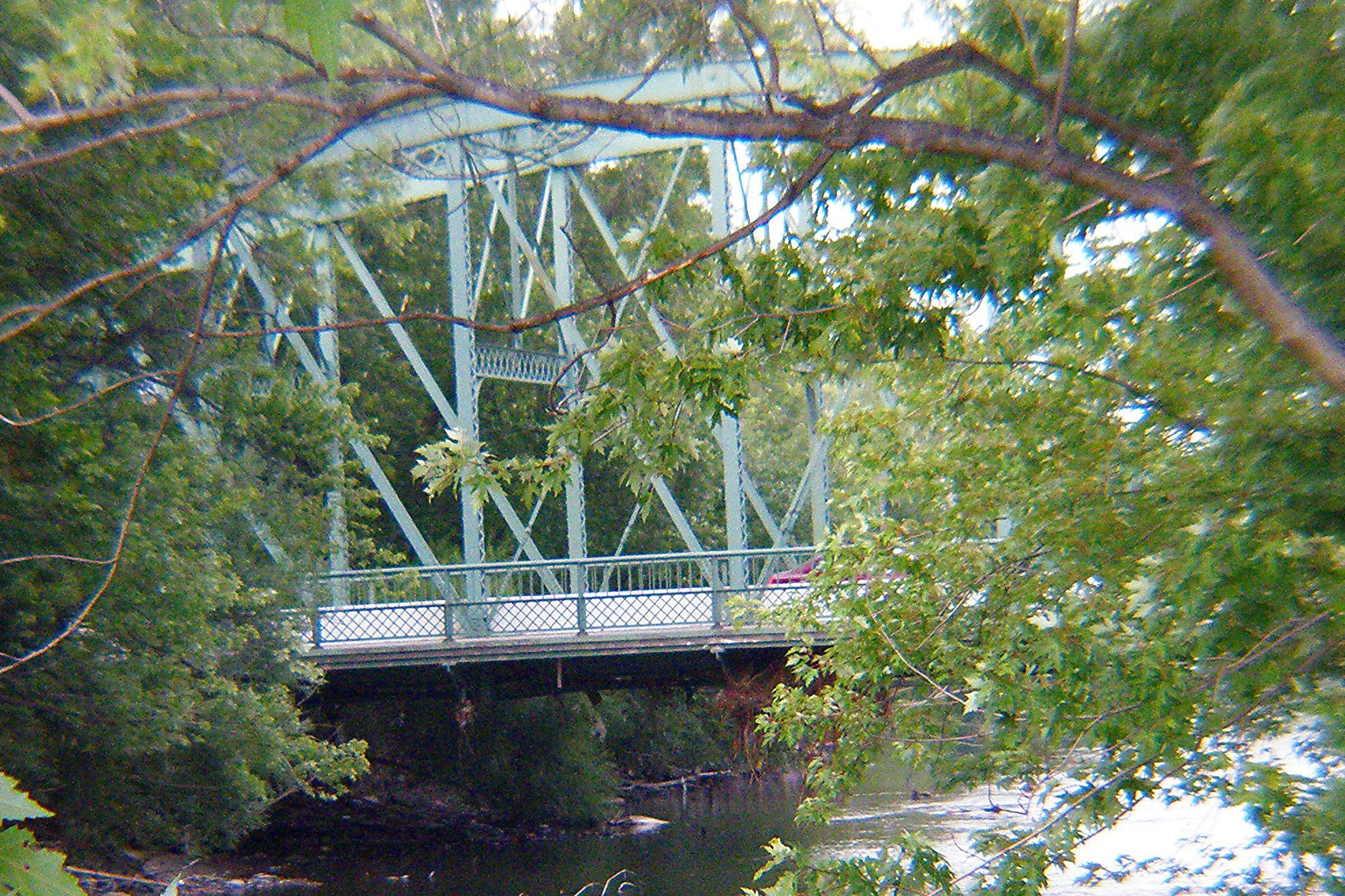
- Arch Street Bridge in 2007
- Coordinates: 40.9233°N 74.1701°W
- Crosses: Passaic River
- Locale: Paterson, New Jersey
- Owner: Passaic County
- Maintained by: County
- ID number: 1600015

Characteristics
- Design: Parker truss
- Material: Steel
- Total length: 184.1 feet (56.1 m) ft.
- Width: 27.6 feet (8.4 m)
- Longest span: 178.2 feet (54.3 m)
- No. of spans: 1
- Clearance above: 13.7 feet (4.2 m)

History
- Constructed by: Oswego Bridge Company
- Construction end: 1905

Arch Street Bridge is Parker truss bridge over the Passaic River in Paterson, New Jersey. It was built in 1907 and rehabilitated in 1997. It was the third structure built at the location within a few years; the prior bridges were destroyed by floods in 1902 and 1903.

The bridge was once a crossing for the Public Service trolley lines.

A historic bridge survey conducted by the New Jersey Department of Transportation (NJDOT) between 1991 and 1994 determined that the bridge was eligible for listing on the New Jersey Register of Historic Places and the National Register of Historic Places. In June 1995, the State Historic Preservation Office concurred, and it was listed on the state register January 30, 2018 and the federal register on March 22, 2018.

== See also ==
- List of crossings of the Hackensack River
- List of crossings of the Lower Passaic River
- List of crossings of the Upper Passaic River
- Passaic River Flood Tunnel
- Sixth Avenue Bridge
- Straight Street Bridge
- West Broadway Bridge
