= Cascade Bridge =

- U.S. National Register of Historic Places
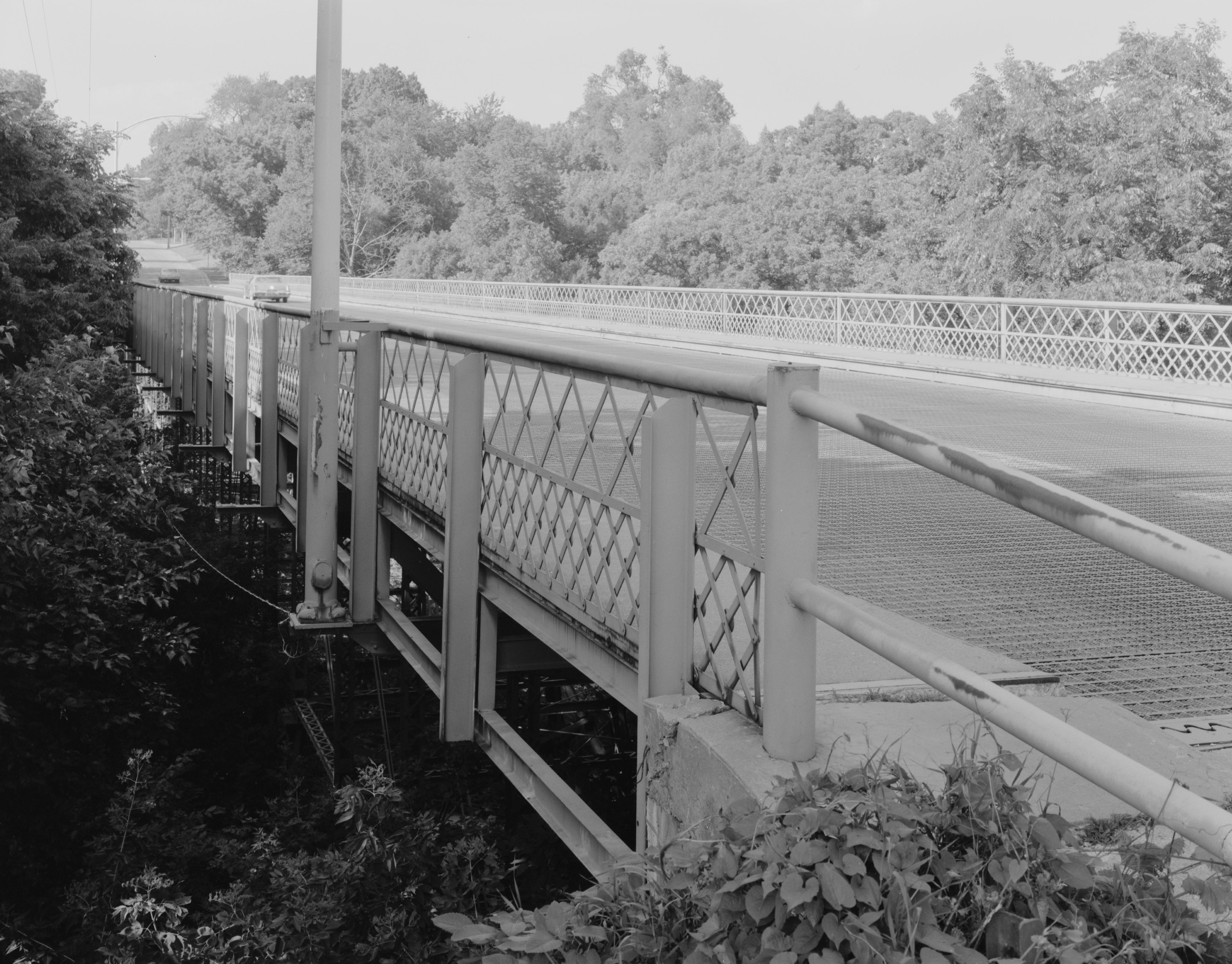

- Location within Iowa Location within the United States
- Location: South Main Street over the Cascade Ravine; Burlington, Iowa
- Coordinates: 40°46′53″N 91°05′55″W
- Area: less than one acre
- Built: 1896
- Built by: Milwaukee Bridge and Iron Works
- Architect: Boynton & Warriner
- Architectural style: Deck truss bridge
- NRHP reference No.: 98000790
- Added to NRHP: June 25, 1998

The Cascade Bridge is a historic structure located in Burlington, Iowa, United States. In April 1896 the Burlington City Council approved a proposal to have city engineer S.D. Eaton advertise for plans and estimates for a bridge on Main Street that would span Cascade Ravine. The Cascade Lumber Company had petitioned for the bridge. The city contracted with the Cedar Rapids, Iowa firm of Boynton & Warriner to design the structure and the Milwaukee Bridge and Iron Works to erect the span. The city was responsible for building the concrete substructure. The bridge was completed in the fall of 1896, and is composed of four spans. The span length is 160 feet (49 m), and its total length is 464 feet (141 m). The span is a Baltimore deck truss bridge with Pratt deck trusses at both ends. The structure is supported by stone and concrete abutments with concrete pedestals and a single concrete-filled steel cylinder pier. Over the years the original deck has been replaced, and concrete has been applied to the stone abutments. Otherwise the structure has been unaltered. The bridge was listed on the National Register of Historic Places in 1998.

The bridge was closed to vehicular traffic in 2008 and as of 2020 has not reopened. The bridge remains closed to pedestrian and bike traffic.

== See also ==
- List of bridges documented by the Historic American Engineering Record in Iowa
