= Volga River State Recreation Area =

State recreation area in Iowa, United States

- Location within Iowa Location within the United States
- Location: Fayette County, Iowa, United States
- Nearest city: Fayette, Iowa
- Coordinates: 42°52′25″N 91°45′50″W
- Area: 5,700 acres (2,300 ha)
- Administrator: Iowa Department of Natural Resources
- Website: Official website

Volga River State Recreation Area is a 5,700-acre (2,300 ha) state recreation area in Fayette County, Iowa, United States, near the city of Fayette. The park is located in a forested and hilly region along the Volga River and also includes the 138-acre (56 ha) Frog Hollow Lake.

The recreation area is a popular site for boating and fishing. The lake has a three-lane boat ramp, while the river is used by canoes and kayaks. The lake has a floating pier and jetties for fishers and is home to bluegill, channel catfish, crappie, largemouth bass, and yellow perch. The park also includes 22 miles (35 km) of multi-use trails for hiking, horseback riding, mountain biking, and cross-country skiing and snowmobiling in the winter. There are two campsites in the recreation area, the modern Lakeview Campground and the equestrian Albany Campground. The entire recreation area is open to hunting, and a seasonal archery range is located near the Albany Campground.
