= Lincoln Highway Bridge (Tama, Iowa) =

- U.S. National Register of Historic Places
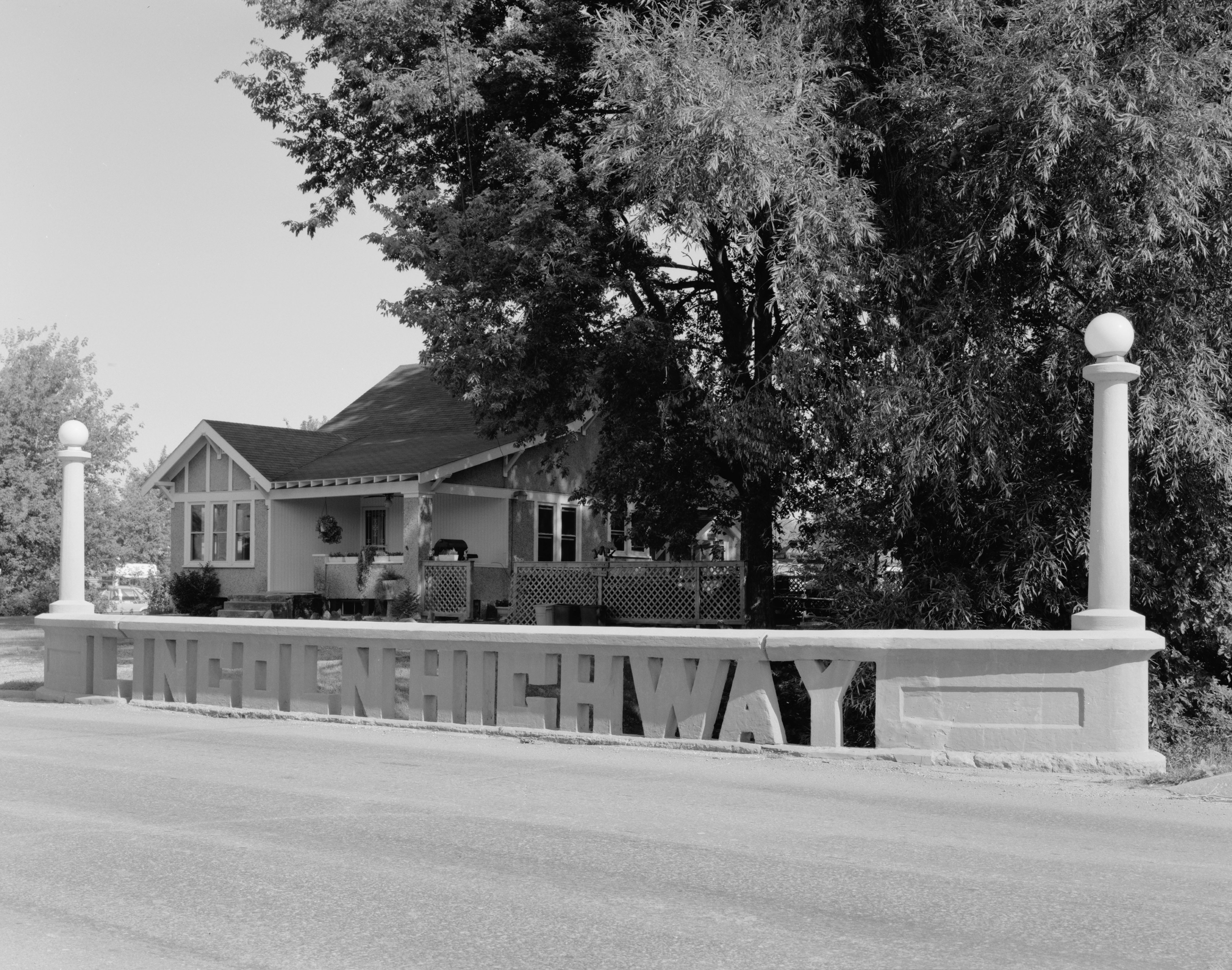
- Lincoln Highway Bridge summer 1995

- Location within Iowa Location within the United States
- Location: East 5th Street; Tama, Iowa
- Coordinates: 41°57′50″N 92°33′44″W
- Area: less than one acre
- Built: 1914
- Built by: Paul N. Kingsley
- Architect: Iowa Highway Commission
- Architectural style: Steel stringer bridge
- NRHP reference No.: 78001263
- Added to NRHP: March 30, 1978

The Lincoln Highway Bridge is located in Tama, Iowa, United States, along the historic Lincoln Highway. The Steel stringer bridge was built in 1914, and it was listed on the National Register of Historic Places in 1978. It spans Mud Creek for 22 feet (6.7 m) with a width of 24 feet (7.3 m). The bridge is noteworthy for its distinctive railings. They are 3.33 feet (1.01 m) high, and feature the words "Lincoln Highway" in concrete. Local boosters of the Lincoln Highway paid for the railings as a way of promoting the roadway. The bridge was designed by the Iowa Highway Commission and built by Paul N. Kingsley, a contractor from Strawberry Point, Iowa.

== See also ==
- List of bridges documented by the Historic American Engineering Record in Iowa
