= Kilbourn Bridge =

- U.S. National Register of Historic Places
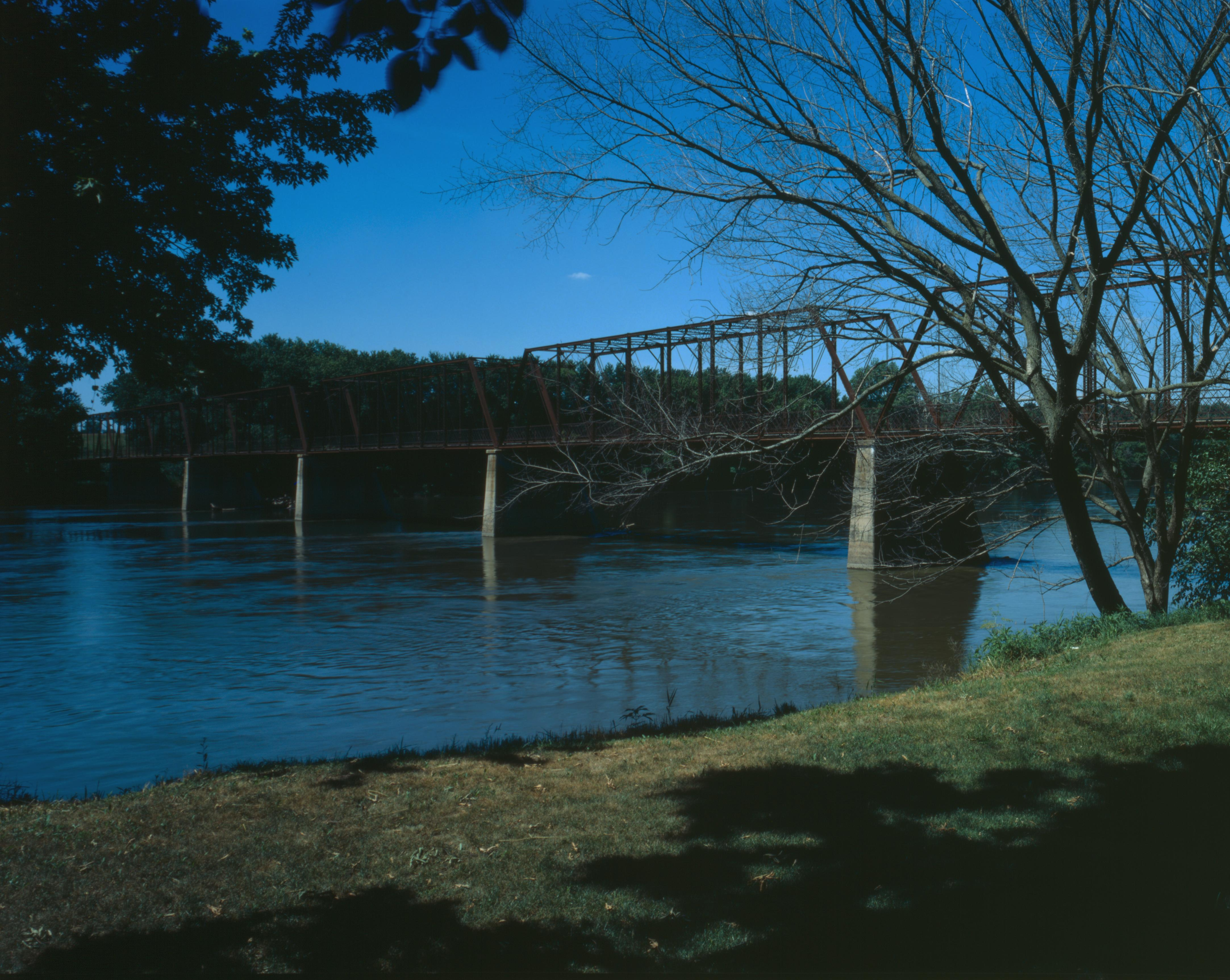

- Location within Iowa Location within the United States
- Location: 3 miles (5 km) west of Iowa Highway 1, Kilbourn, Iowa
- Coordinates: 40°47′59″N 91°58′14″W
- Area: less than one acre
- Built: 1908-1909
- Built by: Ottumwa Supply and Construction Company
- Architect: Iowa State Highway Commission
- Architectural style: Pratt truss
- MPS: Highway Bridges of Iowa MPS
- NRHP reference No.: 98000477
- Added to NRHP: May 15, 1998

The Kilbourn Bridge is located south of Kilbourn, Iowa, United States. It carried traffic on Lark Avenue over the Des Moines River for 855 feet (261 m). In 1890, the Van Buren County Board of Supervisors contracted with the Western Bridge Company of Chicago to build a bridge at the Kilbourn ferry crossing. It was destroyed in a flood in 1903, and the Board of Supervisors put off replacing the bridge until 1907, then all the proposals came over the $20,000 limit. They removed the limit the following year. The six-span bridge was designed by the Iowa State Highway Commission (ISHC), and built by the Ottumwa Supply and Construction Company of Ottumwa, Iowa. It was the first large-scale engineering project undertaken by the newly formed ISHC. The Kilbourn Bridge was listed on the National Register of Historic Places in 1998.

== See also ==
- List of bridges documented by the Historic American Engineering Record in Iowa
