= Grand River Bridge (Leon, Iowa) =

- U.S. National Register of Historic Places
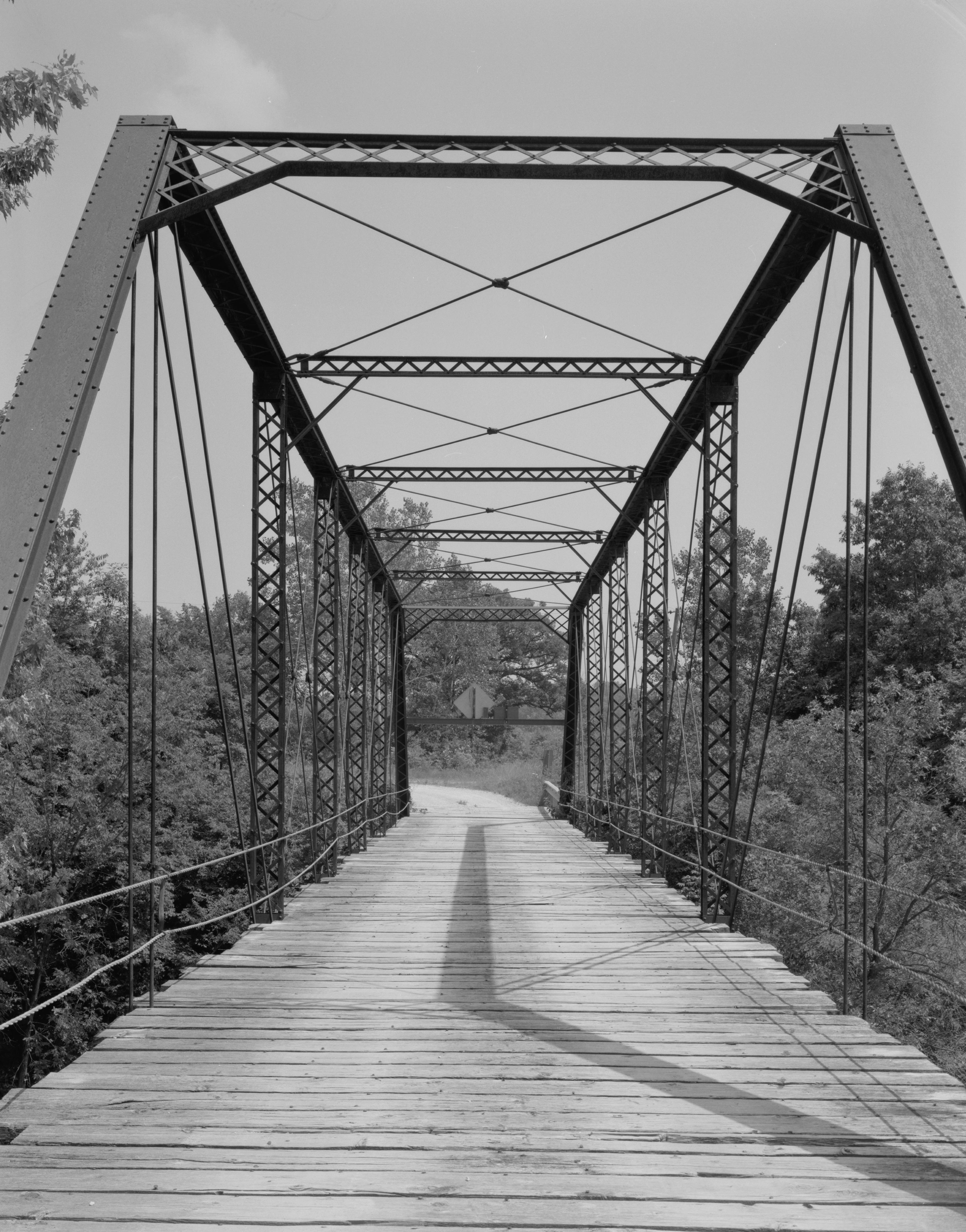

- Location within Iowa Location within the United States
- Location: County road over the Grand River
- Nearest city: Leon, Iowa
- Coordinates: 40°43′18″N 93°52′33″W
- Built: 1890
- Built by: Daniel & Webster
- Architectural style: Pratt through truss Pratt Pony truss
- MPS: Highway Bridges of Iowa MPS
- NRHP reference No.: 98000794
- Added to NRHP: June 25, 1998

The Grand River Bridge is a historic bridge located west of Leon, Iowa, United States. It spans the Grand River for 235 feet (72 m). A 7-panel Pratt Pony truss spans the main channel of the river, with a 4-panel Pratt pony truss/bedstead and timber stringer that forms the approach span on the west side. It was built by bridge contractors Daniel and Webster for $2,980 and completed in 1890. The bridge is no longer in use for vehicular traffic. It was listed on the National Register of Historic Places in 1998.

== See also ==
- List of bridges documented by the Historic American Engineering Record in Iowa
