= Wapsipinicon River Bridge =

- U.S. National Register of Historic Places
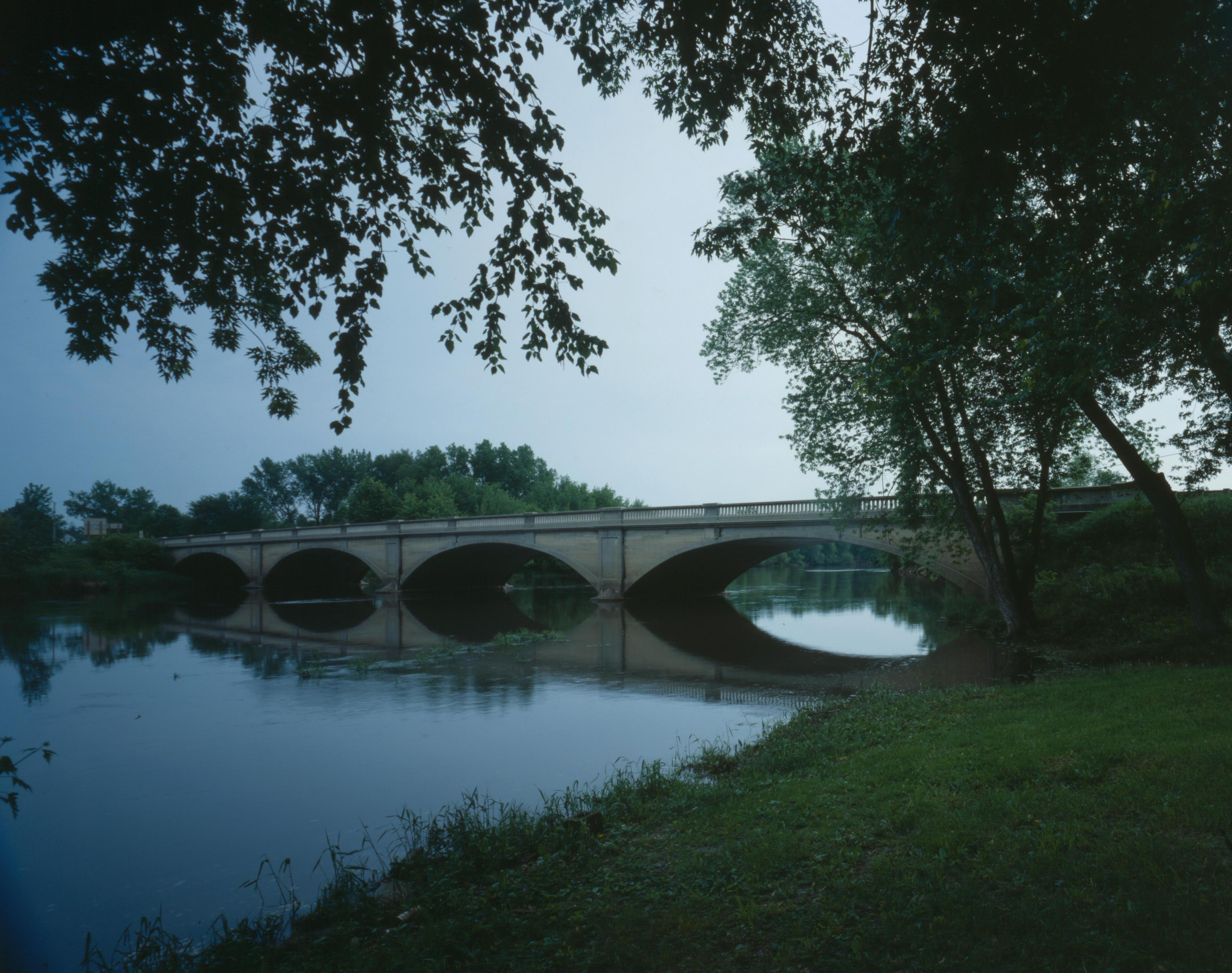

- Location within Iowa Location within the United States
- Location: Iowa Highway 150 over the Wapsipinicon River; Independence, Iowa
- Coordinates: 42°27′33″N 91°53′27″W
- Built: 1926-1927
- Built by: Miller-Taylor Construction Co.
- Architect: Iowa State Highway Commission
- Architectural style: Spandrel arch
- MPS: Highway Bridges of Iowa MPS
- NRHP reference No.: 98000758
- Added to NRHP: June 25, 1998

The Wapsipinicon River Bridge is a historic structure located in Independence, Iowa, United States. It spans the Wapsipinicon River for 341 feet (104 m). The Buchanan County Board of Supervisors contracted with the Miller-Taylor Construction Company from Waterloo, Iowa, to build the new bridge on the south side of Independence for $37,680. However, high water created problems during construction, and the bridge was completed in January 1927 for $57,530. It replaced an earlier two-span iron truss bridge. This bridge is a concrete filled spandrel arch bridge with four spans. It was designed by the Iowa State Highway Commission, and continues to carry vehicle traffic. The bridge was listed on the National Register of Historic Places in 1998. There is a similar bridge upstream in Independence that was built in 1918.

== See also ==
- List of bridges documented by the Historic American Engineering Record in Iowa
