= West Broadway Bridge =

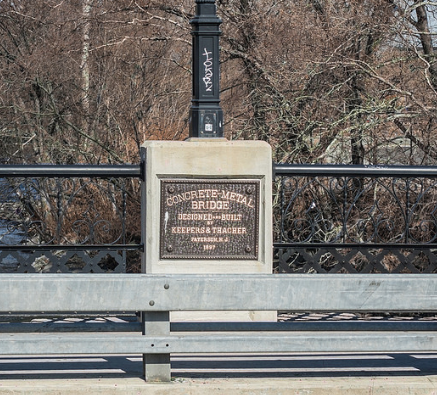
- Coordinates: 40.9211°N 74.1751°W
- Carries: Paterson-Hamburg Turnpike; West Broadway; County Route 509; CR 673
- Crosses: Passaic River
- Locale: Paterson, New Jersey
- Other name(s): West Street Bridge; Concrete-Metal Bridge
- Owner: Passaic County
- Maintained by: County
- ID number: 1600017

Characteristics
- Design: Melan-type arch bridge
- Material: Steel/concrete
- Total length: 290 feet (88 m)
- Width: 35.4 feet (10.8 m)
- Longest span: 86.9 feet (26.5 m)
- No. of spans: 3

History
- Designer: Edwin Thacher
- Construction end: 1897; 2004 rehab
- Opened: 1897

Location
- Interactive map of West Broadway Bridge

The West Broadway Bridge, a.k.a. West Street Bridge and the Concrete-Metal Bridge, is a vehicular bridge over the Passaic River in Paterson, New Jersey. It carries West Broadway (CR 673), traditionally the Paterson-Hamburg Turnpike, and connects to County Route 509 at its west end.

The bridge was built in 1897 and restored in 2004. The flood of 1903 caused damage or destruction of most bridges in the vicinity of Paterson; the West Street bridge survived with serious damage.

The bridge is considered a nationally significant example of the Melan arch bridge technology and one of earliest and the most important concrete-steel spans in the Northeast. A historic bridge survey conducted by NJDOT from 1991–1994 determined that the bridge is eligible for listing on the New Jersey Register of Historic Places and the National Register of Historic Places. In March 1997, the State Historic Preservation Office concurred (NJRHP #3959).

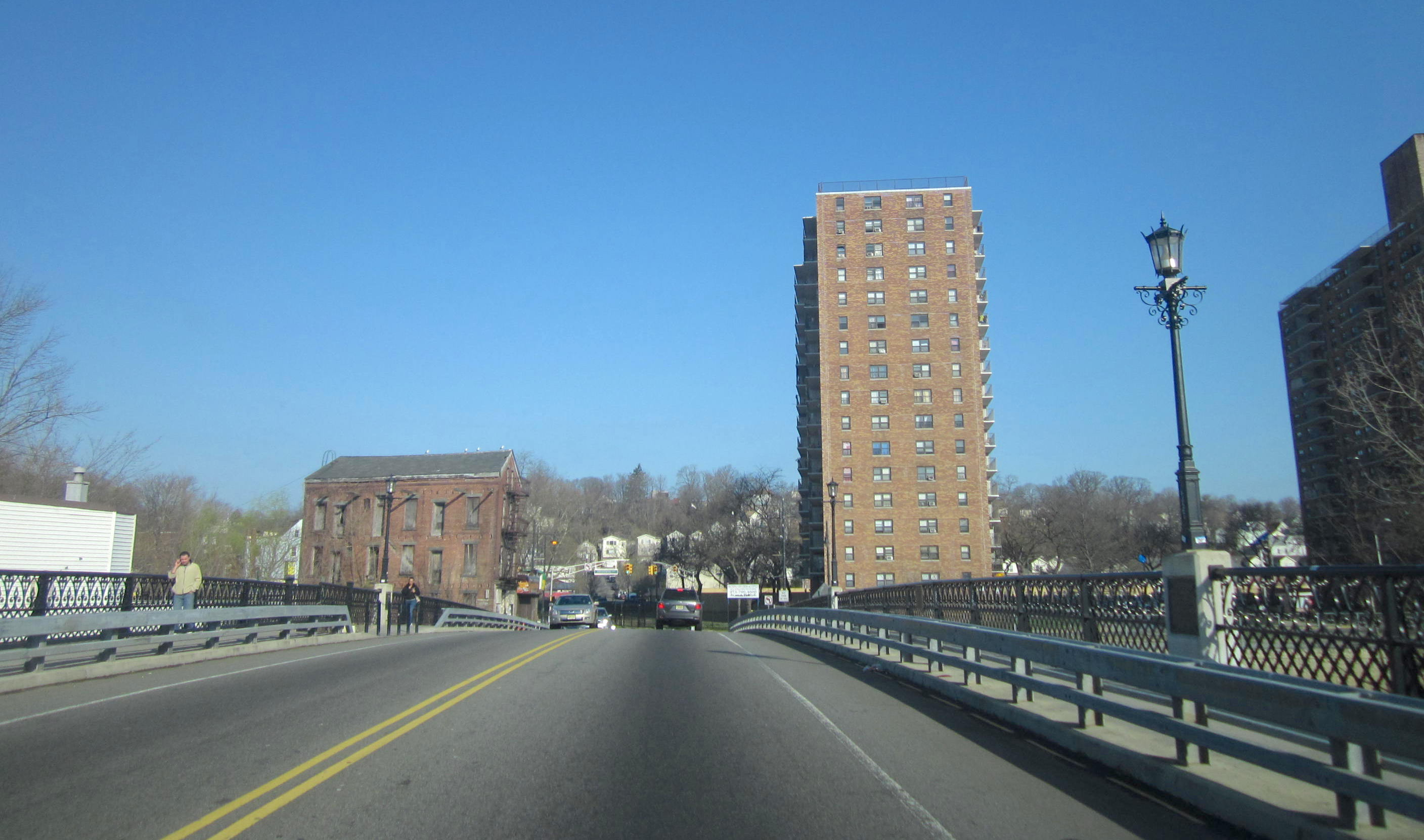
Roadway view in 2012

== See also ==
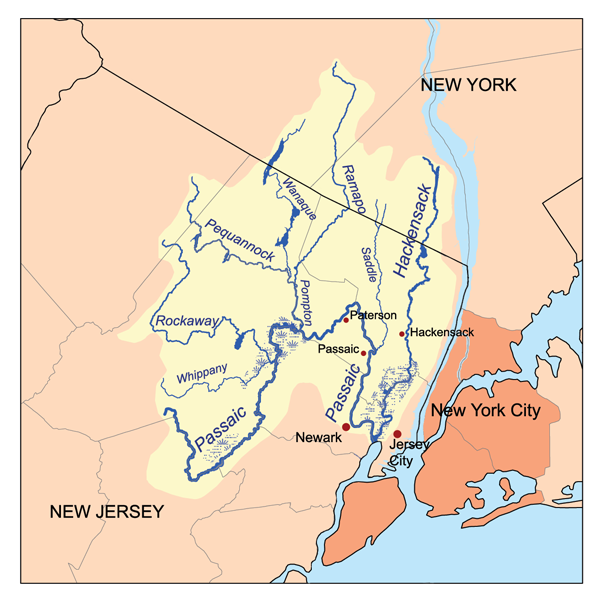
The course and watershed of the Passaic and area prehistoric Lake Passaic

- Arch Street Bridge
- Straight Street Bridge
- List of crossings of the Upper Passaic River
- List of crossings of the Lower Passaic River
- List of crossings of the Hackensack River
- List of county routes in Passaic County, New Jersey
- Melan Bridge
- Passaic River Flood Tunnel
