= Eveland Bridge =

- U.S. National Register of Historic Places
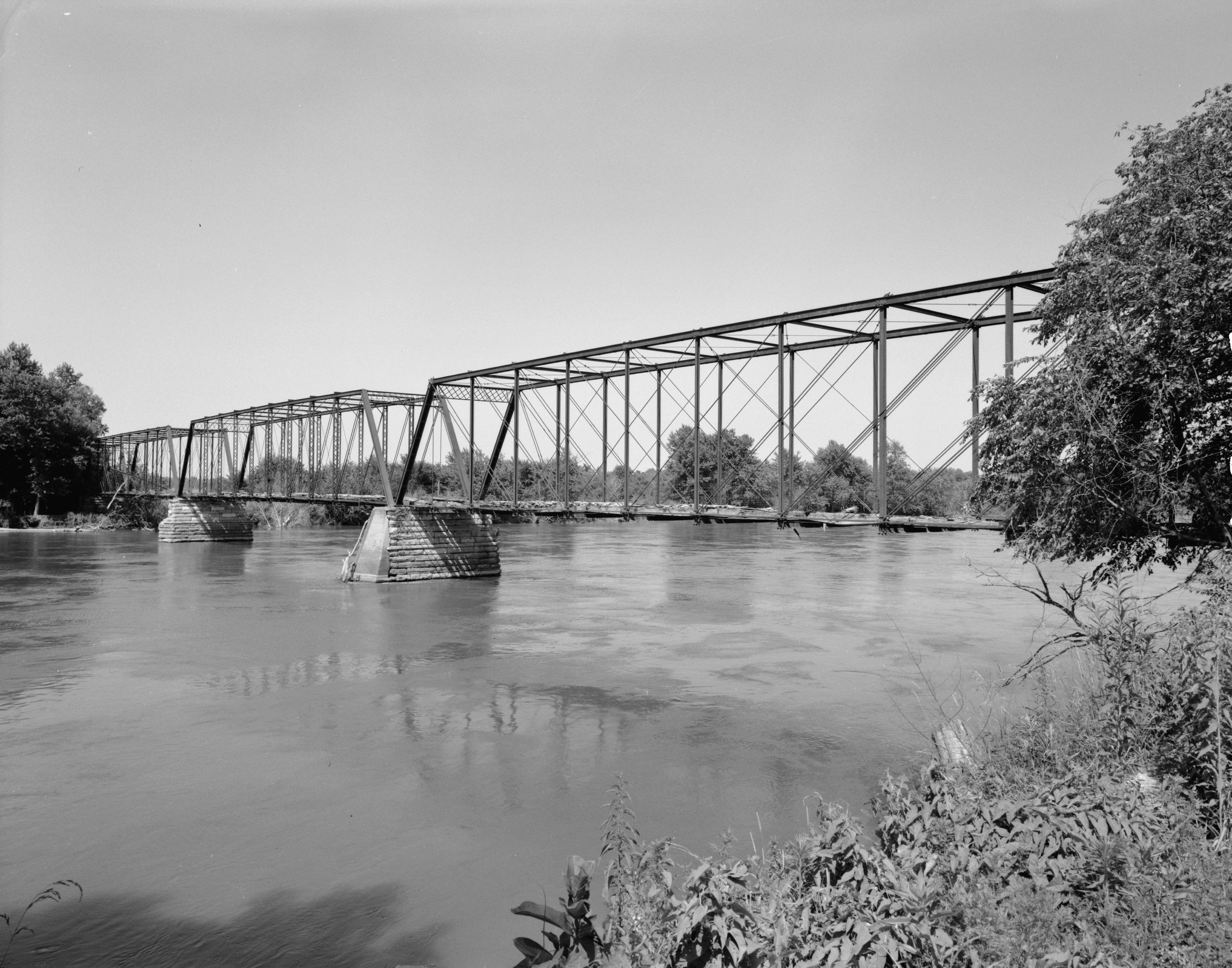

- Location within Iowa Location within the United States
- Location: Fulton Avenue over the Des Moines River
- Nearest city: Oskaloosa, Iowa
- Coordinates: 41°14′34″N 92°45′23″W
- Area: less than one acre
- Built: 1877
- Built by: Fort Wayne Bridge Works
- Architect: C. W. Tracy
- Architectural style: Whipple through truss
- MPS: Highway Bridges of Iowa MPS
- NRHP reference No.: 98000504
- Added to NRHP: May 15, 1998

Eveland Bridge is located southwest of Oskaloosa, Iowa, United States. It carried traffic of Fulton Avenue over the Des Moines River, spanning 647 feet (197 m). After receiving multiple petitions, the Mahaska County Board of Supervisors decided in April 1875 to build a bridge, replacing a ferry service that operated at this point along the river beginning in 1854. They contracted with the Fort Wayne Bridge Works of Fort Wayne, Indiana, to build the new bridge for $25,200. It was designed by C. W. Tracy, a civil engineer. The Whipple through truss span was completed in the summer of 1877. This style was rarely chosen for wagon trusses in Iowa, which means few were built and fewer remain standing. Its deck has subsequently deteriorated and the bridge has been closed to traffic. The Eveland Bridge was listed on the National Register of Historic Places in 1998.

== See also ==
- List of bridges documented by the Historic American Engineering Record in Iowa
