= Melan Bridge =

- U.S. National Register of Historic Places
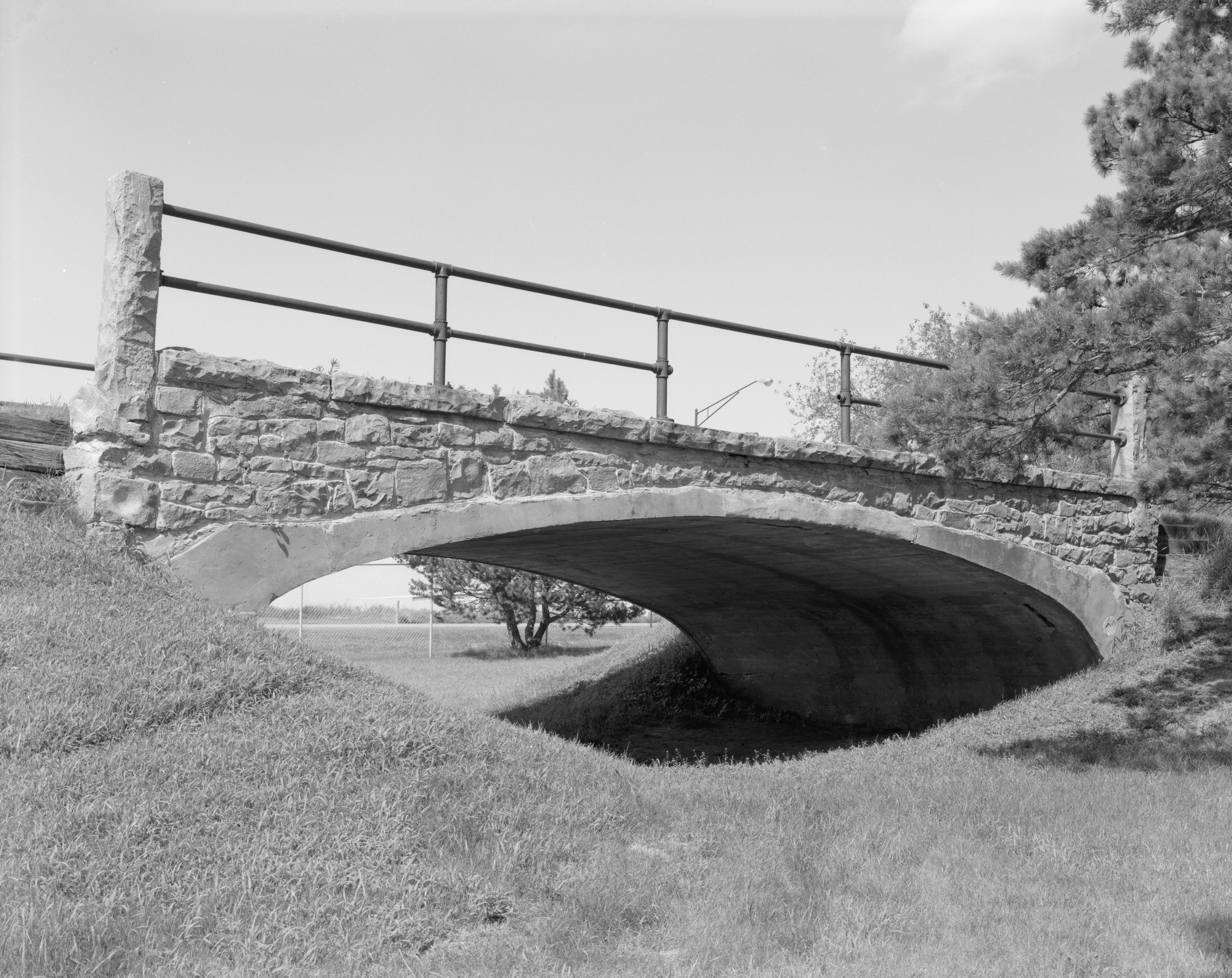

- Location within Iowa Location within the United States
- Location: East of Rock Rapids in Emma Sater Park
- Coordinates: 43°25′57″N 96°09′15″W
- Area: less than one acre
- Built: 1893–1894
- Built by: John Olsen
- Architect: Fritz von Emperger
- Architectural style: Arch bridge
- NRHP reference No.: 74000797
- Added to NRHP: October 18, 1974

The Melan Bridge is located in Emma Sater Park on the east side of Rock Rapids, Iowa, United States. The 30-by-16-foot (9.1 by 4.9 m) structure is believed to be the third reinforced concrete arch span built in the country. Austrian engineer Josef Melan developed a new system of concrete reinforcement for bridge construction in the early 1890s. A fellow Austrian, Fritz von Emperger, introduced the system in the United States, and obtained a patent for it in 1893.

Von Emperger designed this bridge the same year to span a crossing over Dry Creek south of Rock Rapids. John Olsen, a builder from Rock Rapids, was contracted to build the structure. William S. Hewett of Minnesota was the construction supervisor. The cement for the bridge was imported from Germany for $3.25 per barrel. It was mixed with sand and crushed jasper. The reinforcing is composed of five 4-inch (10 cm) beams that are embedded in a concrete rib that narrows to 6 inches (15 cm) at the crown. The spandrels are faced with Sioux Falls Jasper. The total cost for the project was $830. The narrow roadway made the bridge unfit for automobile traffic, and it was removed in the early 1960s. Due to local public sentiment, the county and the state highway commission moved the historic structure to the park in 1964. It was listed on the National Register of Historic Places in 1974.

The Melan Bridge has been featured in the Cornell Civil Engineer, Modern Concrete Magazine, Concrete Industry News, and The Central Contractor. Because of its significance and authenticity, a model of the bridge has been on display at the Smithsonian Institution in Washington, D.C.

== See also ==
- List of bridges documented by the Historic American Engineering Record in Iowa
- West Broadway Bridge
