= Southwest Fifth St. Bridge =

- U.S. National Register of Historic Places
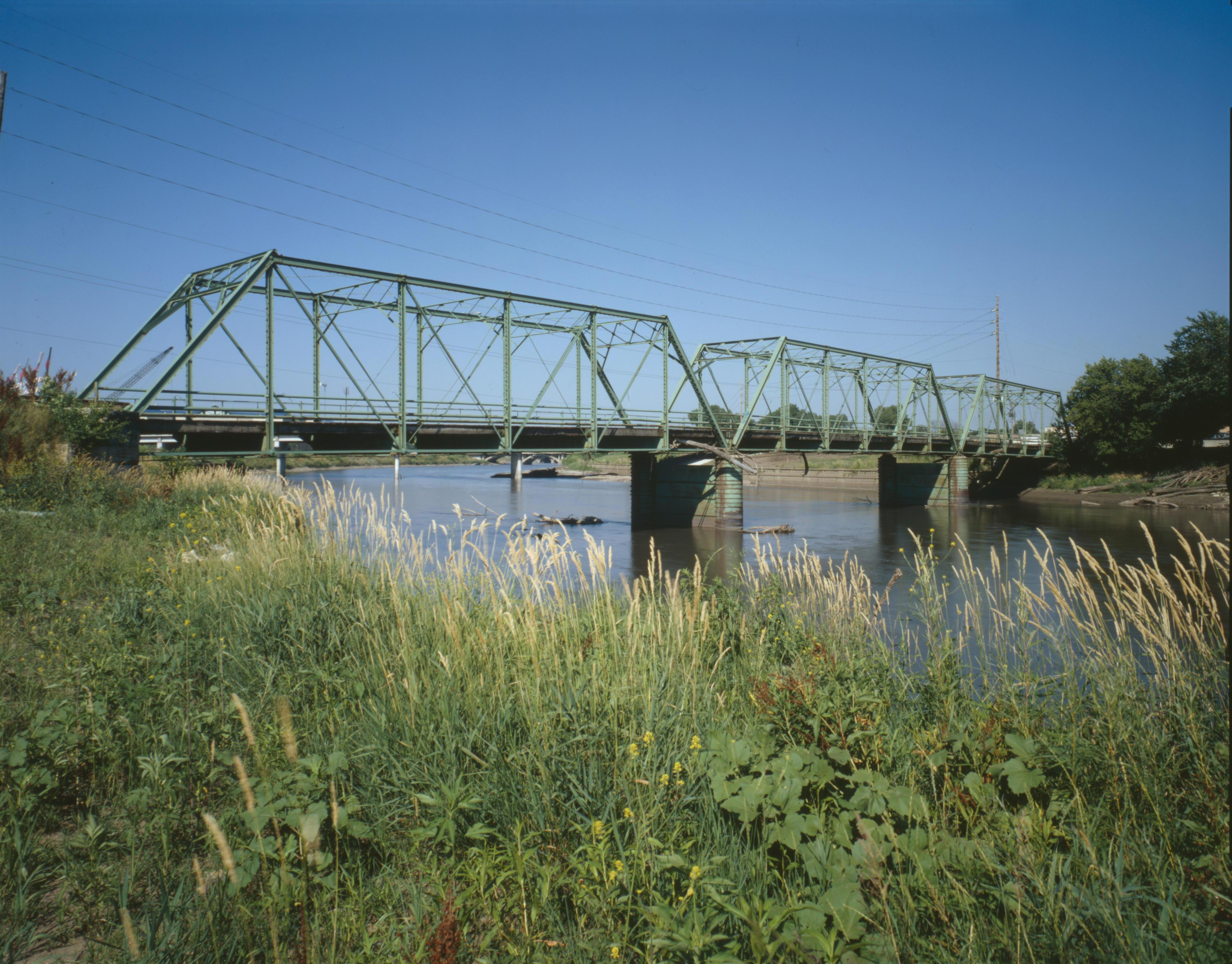

- Location within Iowa Location within the United States
- Location: Southwest 5th Street over the Raccoon River, Des Moines, Iowa
- Coordinates: 41°34′37″N 93°37′10″W
- Built: 1898
- Built by: Des Moines City Engineer; Jones & Laughlin Steel Company; J. H. Killmar
- Architect: L. Higgins
- Architectural style: Pratt truss bridge
- MPS: Highway Bridges of Iowa MPS
- NRHP reference No.: 98000487
- Added to NRHP: May 15, 1998

The Southwest Fifth St. Bridge is a historic structure located in downtown Des Moines, Iowa, United States. Built in 1898 after a controversy surrounding the bidding process, it is one of the last Pratt through truss bridges left in an urban setting in Iowa. The bridge was listed on the National Register of Historic Places in 1998 as a part of the Highway Bridges of Iowa MPS.

== History ==
The bridge was built amidst controversy in the late 19th century. The first controversy that the bridge faced was its placement. The bridge was first suggested in 1896. The aldermen on the west side of town wanted a bridge over the Raccoon River at Fifth Street. The aldermen on the east side thought that a bridge was needed over the Des Moines River at East Sixth Street to better serve that part of town. After some delay, the Fifth Street bridge was provided for with a Sixth Street bridge to be built the following year.

The second controversy, which ended up before the Iowa Supreme Court, had to do with the contract to build the bridge. J. H. Killmar won the contract with a low bid of $19,100. The other bidders charged that the specifications for the bridge were too general and Killmar's plans were flawed. Killmar had underbid the bridge combine by $5,000. The combine, or pool, had been established by the bridge building industry to counteract the ruthless competition that occurred during the bidding process as the result of the economic depression from 1873 to 1879. Killmar had been given more detailed plans for the bridge, but the city council said the other companies would have been given those plans had they asked for them. The lower court agreed with the combine, but on October 20, 1897 the Iowa Supreme Court sided with Killmar saying the specifications the other companies were given were adequate and that the work was not let for too large a sum.

Killmar had planned to start construction in the fall of 1897, however, those plans had to be delayed because the steel for the piers and the superstructure had not arrived. The Des Moines Leader reported that the delay was due to the King Bridge Company who was responsible for supplying the steel and was one of the companies that was outbid for the contract to construct the bridge. King Bridge delayed work on the bridge until after the 60 days the plaintiffs had to demand a rehearing. Work was delayed until the spring of 1898 and the structure was completed on June 17, 1898. The bridge was used for vehicle traffic until 1993 when it was closed and was used after that as part of a recreational trail.

In 2013, the bridge was up for demolition. Several neighborhood and city associations attempted to stop the demolition with no success by December 2013, but then they raised $2.3 million to stabilize and rebuild it, and the city of Des Moines agreed to pay the $750,000 it had planned to use for demolition toward the project, plus another $125,000 later on, as well as $500,000 from a state grant. The bridge was restored and reopened on Friday, November 11, 2016.

== Design ==
The Southwest Fifth Street Bridge is one of a few pinned Pratt through truss bridges with three or more spans left in the state of Iowa. It is also one of only three left in an urban setting in the state. The structure is composed of three six-panel, pin-connected steel Pratt through trusses. Each span is 135 feet (41 m) for a total span length of 401 feet (122 m). The roadway is 30 feet (9 m) wide. The steel structure rests on top of stone abutments and steel cylinder piers filled with concrete. The bridge was designed by L. Higgins, the Des Moines City Engineer, based on a bridge design fabricated by The King Bridge Company.

== See also ==
- List of bridges documented by the Historic American Engineering Record in Iowa
