= Straight Street Bridge =

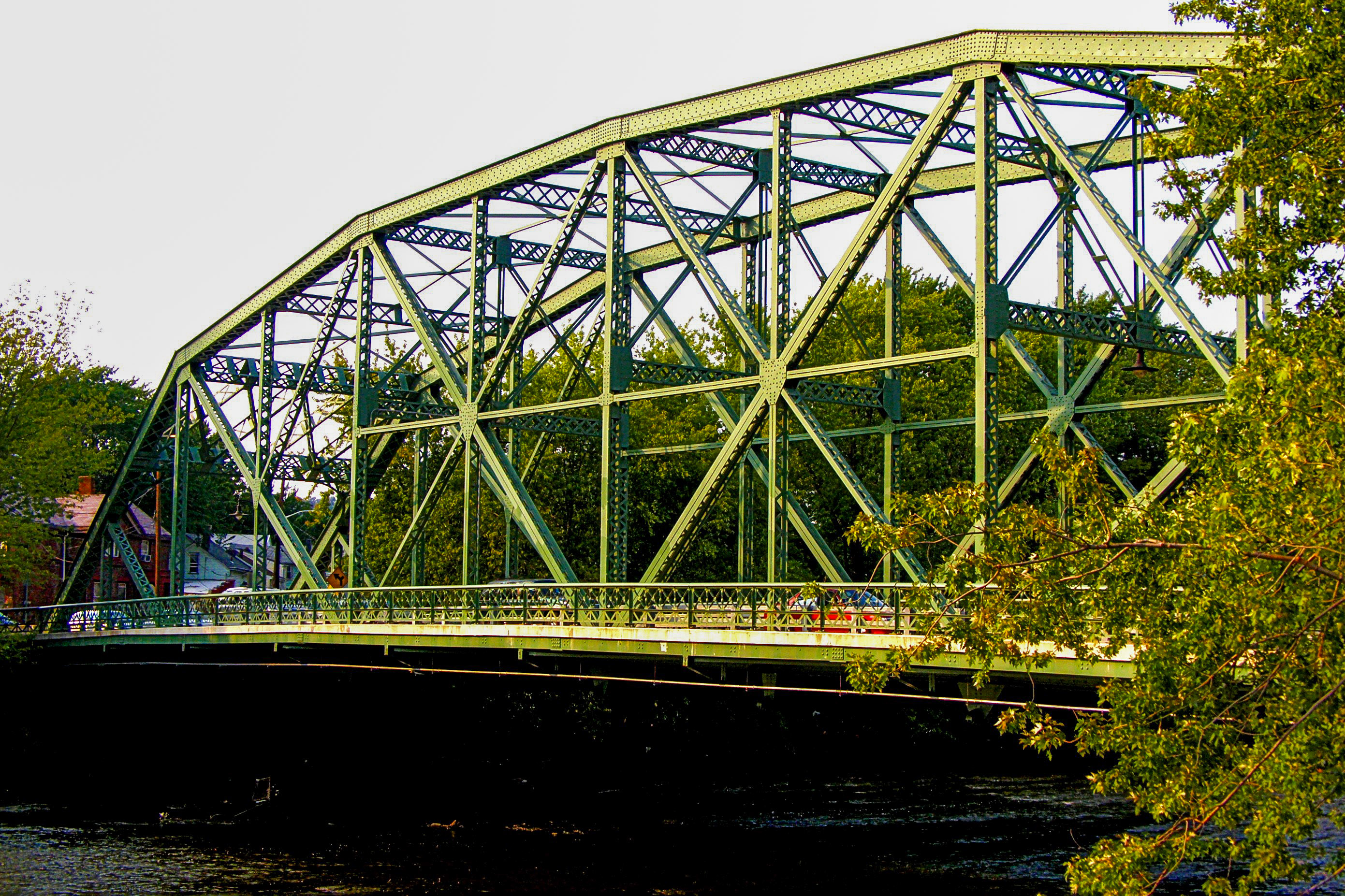
- The Straight Street Bridge in 2007
- Coordinates: 40.9263°N 74.1661°W
- Carries: Straight Street; North Bridge Street; CR 650
- Crosses: Passaic River
- Locale: Paterson, New Jersey
- Owner: Passaic County
- Maintained by: County
- ID number: 1600014

Characteristics
- Design: Pennsylvania truss
- Material: Steel
- Total length: 254.9 feet (77.7 m)
- Width: 30.7 feet (9.4 m)
- Longest span: 251.0 feet (76.5 m)
- No. of spans: 1
- Clearance above: 18.5 feet (5.6 m)

History
- Designer: Albert Fink
- Engineering design by: Colin R. Wise
- Construction end: 1907
- Opened: 1907

The Straight Street Bridge is a vehicular bridge over the Passaic River in Paterson, New Jersey, that is listed on the National Register of Historic Places.

== Original construction and description ==
The single span Pennsylvania (petit) truss bridge on brownstone ashlar abutments. It was completed in 1907, using the substructure which had been built for an earlier bridge that had washed away in Passaic River Flood of 1903. The truss type was originally designed for the Pennsylvania Railroad to support the heavy loads required for rail traffic and were seldom used on roads, the industrial setting of Paterson at the time influenced the decision to build a stronger bridge at that location.

== Rehabilitation and historic status ==
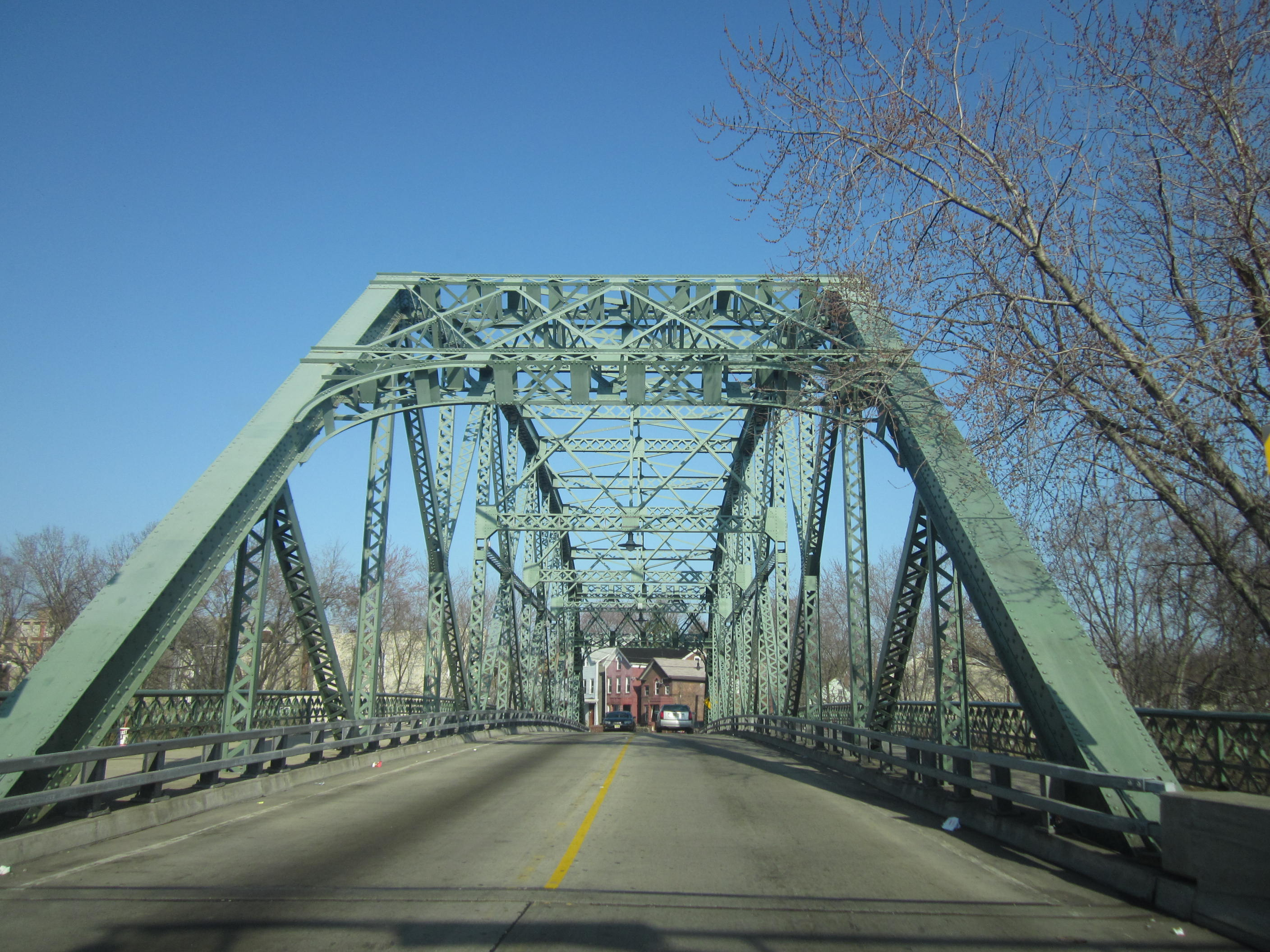
Roadway view of bridge from its southeast end, 2012

A historic rehabilitation of the bridge completed in 2003 by the New Jersey Department of Transportation (NJDOT) with little visible change to the superstructure while components below the bridge deck and the cantilevered sidewalks were replaced. Round headed bolts replaced deteriorated rivets, a hollow steel rail barrier to protect the trusses was used in place of standard guide rail and historic style light fixtures were installed. Deteriorated elements were replaced and the original sidewalk railing was sandblasted, painted and re-installed.

A historic bridge survey conducted by NJDOT from 1991–1994 determined that the bridge was eligible for listing on the New Jersey Register of Historic Places and the National Register of Historic Places. In March 1997, the State Historic Preservation Office concurred (ID#4209). It was listed on the state register January 30, 2018 and the federal register on March 22, 2018.

== See also ==
- Arch Street Bridge
- West Broadway Bridge
- List of crossings of the Lower Passaic River
- List of crossings of the Upper Passaic River
- List of crossings of the Hackensack River
- List of county routes in Passaic County, New Jersey
- Passaic River Flood Tunnel
- National Bridge Inventory
