= Fremont Mill Bridge =

- U.S. National Register of Historic Places
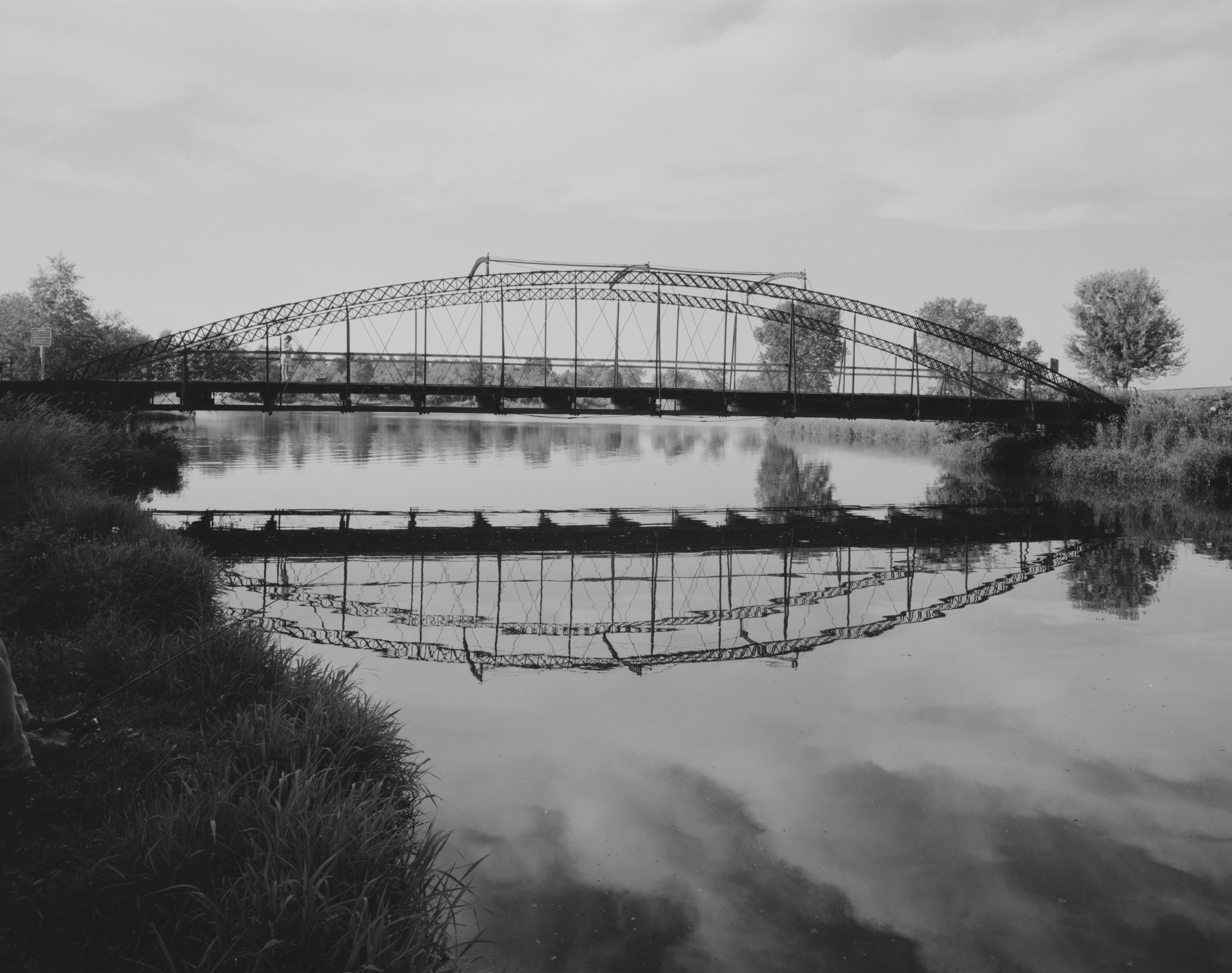

- Location within Iowa Location within the United States
- Nearest city: Anamosa, Iowa
- Coordinates: 42°06′38″N 91°08′26″W
- Area: less than one acre
- Built: 1873
- Built by: Massillon Iron Bridge Company (superstructure); James Milne (substructure)
- Architectural style: bowstring through arch
- MPS: Highway Bridges of Iowa MPS
- NRHP reference No.: 98000537
- Added to NRHP: May 15, 1998

The Fremont Mill Bridge near Anamosa, Iowa was built in 1873. Its superstructure was designed and built by Massillon Iron Bridge Company and its foundations were built by James Milne. It is a wrought iron bowstring through arch bridge.

It originally spanned the Maquoketa River in Monticello City and was built to replace a bridge that had been destroyed by ice flow.

The bridge has been moved twice, first in 1930 to span Buffalo Creek, and again in 1986. As of 1994, it served to bring a pedestrian path over a small pond in Jones County's Central Park, in Jackson Township, Iowa, about 7 miles (11 km) west of Anamosa.

The Fremont Mill Bridge was listed on the National Register of Historic Places in 1998.

== See also ==
- List of bridges documented by the Historic American Engineering Record in Iowa
