= Red Bridge (Postville, Iowa) =

- U.S. National Register of Historic Places
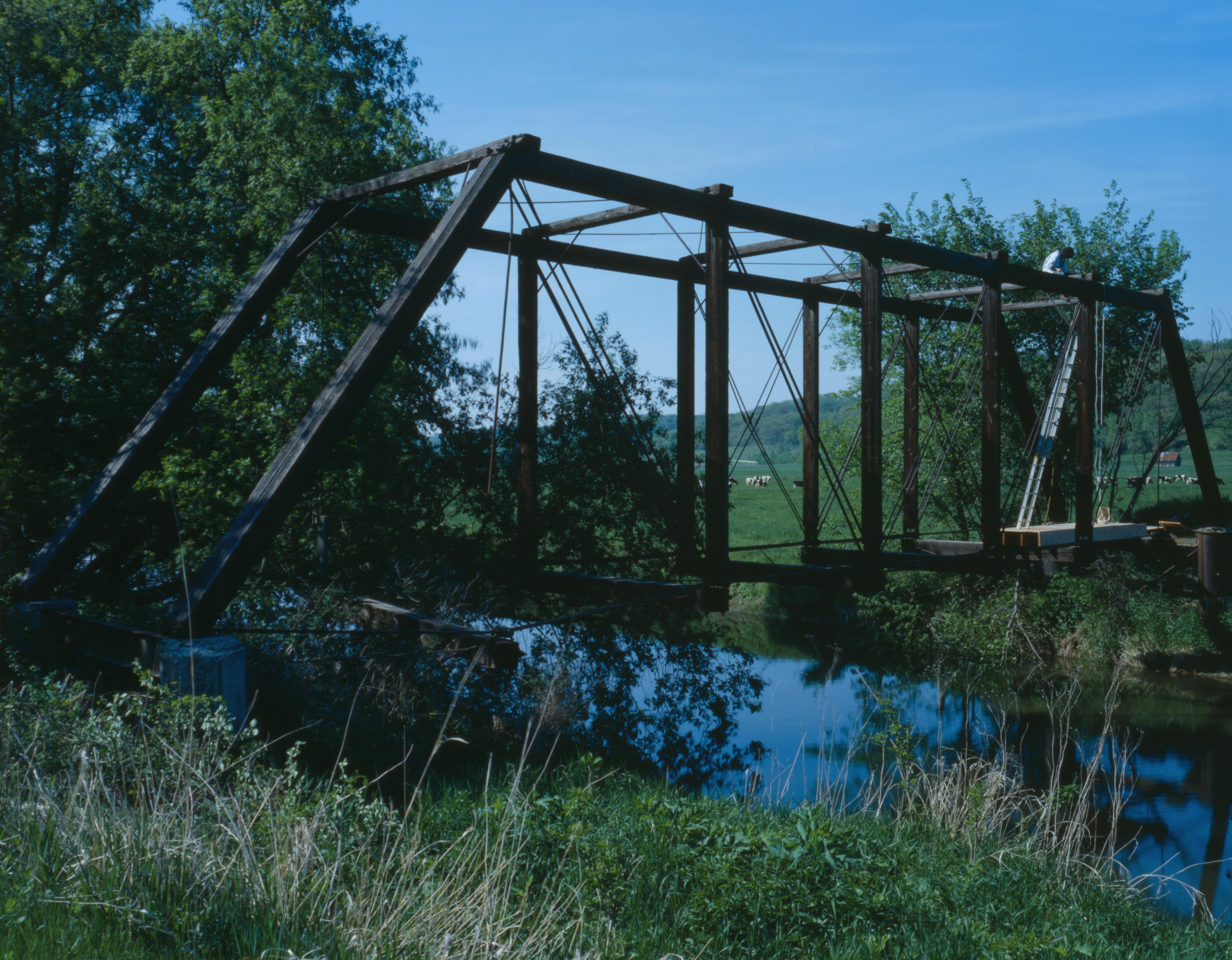

- Location within Iowa Location within the United States
- Location: Fuel Hollow Road over the Yellow River
- Nearest city: Postville, Iowa
- Coordinates: 43°07′51″N 91°25′29″W
- Built: 1920
- Built by: A. L. Powell
- Architect: Allamakee County Engineer
- Architectural style: Pratt through truss
- MPS: Highway Bridges of Iowa MPS
- NRHP reference No.: 98000773
- Added to NRHP: May 15, 1998

Red Bridge is a historic structure located northeast of Postville, Iowa, United States. It spans the Yellow River for 128 feet (39 m). The Allamakee County Engineer designed the timber Pratt through truss structure, and it was erected by a local contractor named A. L. Powell in 1920. Built for $2,304.74, it is composed of timber compression members and forged iron tension members. The structural steel was provided by the Worden-Allen Company of Milwaukee, and City Lumber provided the timbers. At some point it was abandoned and the timber deck and stringers were removed. It is the last uncovered timber truss bridge remaining in Iowa. The bridge was listed on the National Register of Historic Places in 1998.

== See also ==
- List of bridges documented by the Historic American Engineering Record in Iowa
