= Fayette, Iowa =

- City
- Location of Fayette, Iowa

- Location in the United States
- Coordinates: 42°50′30″N 91°48′14″W
- Country: USA
- State: Iowa
- County: Fayette

Area
  - Total: 1.50 sq mi (3.88 km^{2})
  - Land: 1.50 sq mi (3.88 km^{2})
  - Water: 0 sq mi (0.00 km^{2})
- Elevation: 1,004 ft (306 m)

Population (2020)
  - Total: 1,256
  - Density: 838.7/sq mi (323.84/km^{2})
- Time zone: UTC-6 (Central (CST))
  - Summer (DST): UTC-5 (CDT)
- ZIP code: 52142
- Area code: 563
- FIPS code: 19-27165
- GNIS feature ID: 467827

Fayette is a city in Fayette County, Iowa, United States. As of the 2020 census, the city population was 1,256. It was named after the Marquis de la Fayette, French hero of the American Revolutionary War. Fayette is the home of Upper Iowa University, a small private college. The Volga River State Recreation Area is located just north of Fayette, and many other parks and natural areas are nearby.

William B. Dohrmann was the mayor for 24 years and ended his term in 2013.

== Geography ==
Fayette is located on the Volga River. It is located just a few miles south of Volga River State Recreation Area.

According to the United States Census Bureau, the city has a total area of 1.48 square miles (3.83 km^{2}), all land.

=== Climate ===
Climate data for Fayette, Iowa (1991–2020 normals, extremes 1893–present)
Month	Jan	Feb	Mar	Apr	May	Jun	Jul	Aug	Sep	Oct	Nov	Dec	Year
Record high °F (°C)	61 (16)	72 (22)	86 (30)	96 (36)	109 (43)	108 (42)	110 (43)	104 (40)	101 (38)	91 (33)	79 (26)	67 (19)	110 (43)
Mean daily maximum °F (°C)	24.5 (−4.2)	29.0 (−1.7)	42.3 (5.7)	57.1 (13.9)	69.1 (20.6)	78.5 (25.8)	81.6 (27.6)	79.8 (26.6)	73.5 (23.1)	60.3 (15.7)	43.9 (6.6)	30.5 (−0.8)	55.8 (13.2)
Daily mean °F (°C)	15.3 (−9.3)	19.2 (−7.1)	32.1 (0.1)	45.2 (7.3)	57.2 (14.0)	67.2 (19.6)	70.5 (21.4)	68.3 (20.2)	60.8 (16.0)	48.3 (9.1)	34.1 (1.2)	21.9 (−5.6)	45.0 (7.2)
Mean daily minimum °F (°C)	6.2 (−14.3)	9.4 (−12.6)	21.9 (−5.6)	33.3 (0.7)	45.3 (7.4)	55.8 (13.2)	59.5 (15.3)	56.8 (13.8)	48.1 (8.9)	36.3 (2.4)	24.4 (−4.2)	13.3 (−10.4)	34.2 (1.2)
Record low °F (°C)	−38 (−39)	−40 (−40)	−33 (−36)	−2 (−19)	18 (−8)	30 (−1)	38 (3)	33 (1)	15 (−9)	−5 (−21)	−20 (−29)	−34 (−37)	−40 (−40)
Average precipitation inches (mm)	1.22 (31)	1.21 (31)	2.06 (52)	4.13 (105)	5.05 (128)	5.91 (150)	5.32 (135)	4.13 (105)	3.87 (98)	2.90 (74)	2.06 (52)	1.65 (42)	39.51 (1,004)
Average snowfall inches (cm)	10.8 (27)	9.9 (25)	5.4 (14)	1.8 (4.6)	0.0 (0.0)	0.0 (0.0)	0.0 (0.0)	0.0 (0.0)	0.0 (0.0)	0.3 (0.76)	2.7 (6.9)	10.2 (26)	41.1 (104)
Average precipitation days (≥ 0.01 in)	6.9	6.5	8.4	10.6	12.9	11.9	9.6	9.4	9.2	8.9	7.1	7.9	109.3
Average snowy days (≥ 0.1 in)	5.9	5.3	3.1	0.9	0.0	0.0	0.0	0.0	0.0	0.3	1.8	5.2	22.5
Source: NOAA

== Demographics ==
Historical population
Year	Pop.	±%
1880	995	—
1890	1,062	+6.7%
1900	1,315	+23.8%
1910	1,112	−15.4%
1920	1,085	−2.4%
1930	1,083	−0.2%
1940	1,162	+7.3%
1950	1,469	+26.4%
1960	1,597	+8.7%
1970	1,947	+21.9%
1980	1,515	−22.2%
1990	1,317	−13.1%
2000	1,300	−1.3%
2010	1,338	+2.9%
2020	1,256	−6.1%
Source: "U.S. Census website". United States Census Bureau. Source: U.S. Decennial Census

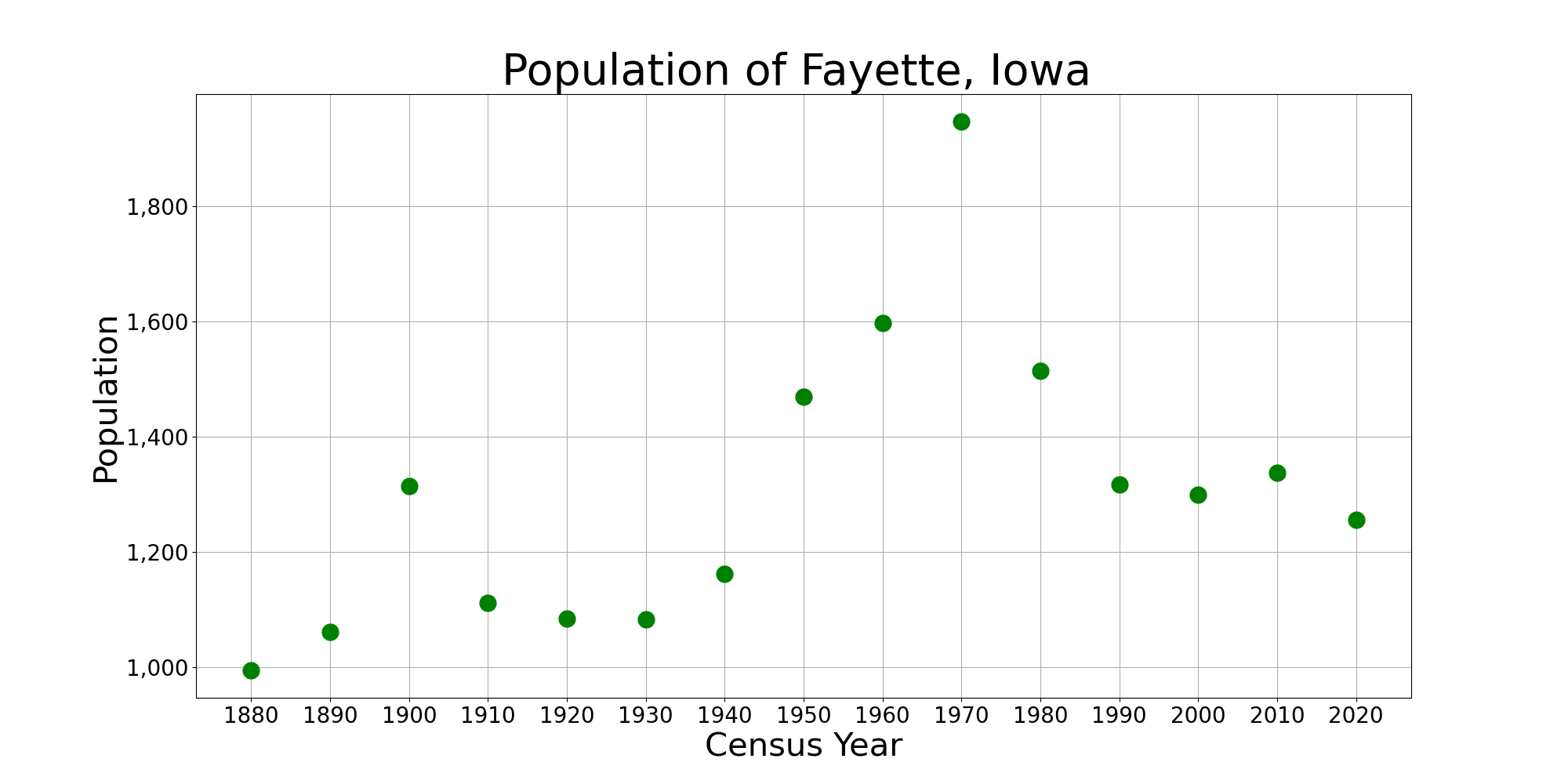
The population of Fayette, Iowa from US census data

=== 2020 census ===
As of the 2020 census, Fayette had a population of 1,256, with 355 households and 173 families residing in the city. The population density was 838.7 inhabitants per square mile (323.8/km^{2}). There were 444 housing units at an average density of 296.5 per square mile (114.5/km^{2}).

The median age was 24.0 years. 15.6% of residents were under the age of 18, and 17.7% were 65 years of age or older. 35.6% of residents were under the age of 20; 15.6% were between the ages of 20 and 24; 16.8% were from 25 to 44; and 14.3% were from 45 to 64. For every 100 females there were 106.9 males, and for every 100 females age 18 and over there were 108.7 males age 18 and over.

0.0% of residents lived in urban areas, while 100.0% lived in rural areas.

There were 355 households, of which 18.0% had children under the age of 18 living in them. Of all households, 38.3% were married-couple households, 5.6% were cohabitating-couple households, 27.6% were households with a male householder and no spouse or partner present, and 28.5% were households with a female householder and no spouse or partner present. About 51.3% of households were non-families, 42.8% were made up of individuals, and 18.6% had someone living alone who was 65 years of age or older.

There were 444 housing units, of which 20.0% were vacant. The homeowner vacancy rate was 6.8% and the rental vacancy rate was 19.4%.

Racial composition as of the 2020 census
Race	Number	Percent
White	1,119	89.1%
Black or African American	54	4.3%
American Indian and Alaska Native	7	0.6%
Asian	24	1.9%
Native Hawaiian and Other Pacific Islander	0	0.0%
Some other race	18	1.4%
Two or more races	34	2.7%
Hispanic or Latino (of any race)	48	3.8%

=== 2010 census ===
As of the census of 2010, there were 1,338 people, 434 households, and 185 families living in the city. The population density was 904.1 inhabitants per square mile (349.1/km^{2}). There were 485 housing units at an average density of 327.7 per square mile (126.5/km^{2}). The racial makeup of the city was 88.6% White, 6.7% African American, 1.9% Asian, 0.1% Pacific Islander, 1.0% from other races, and 1.6% from two or more races. Hispanic or Latino of any race were 2.8% of the population.

There were 434 households, of which 20.3% had children under the age of 18 living with them, 34.8% were married couples living together, 5.8% had a female householder with no husband present, 2.1% had a male householder with no wife present, and 57.4% were non-families. 37.1% of all households were made up of individuals, and 14% had someone living alone who was 65 years of age or older. The average household size was 2.18 and the average family size was 2.94.

The median age in the city was 22.3 years. 11.9% of residents were under the age of 18; 45.3% were between the ages of 18 and 24; 12.7% were from 25 to 44; 16% were from 45 to 64; and 14.1% were 65 years of age or older. The gender makeup of the city was 51.9% male and 48.1% female.

=== 2000 census ===
As of the census of 2000, there were 1,300 people, 399 households, and 233 families living in the city. The population density was 870.9 inhabitants per square mile (336.3/km^{2}). There were 446 housing units at an average density of 298.8 per square mile (115.4/km^{2}). The racial makeup of the city was 88.54% White, 5.15% African American, 0.38% Native American, 2.54% Asian, 0.15% Pacific Islander, 1.38% from other races, and 1.85% from two or more races. Hispanic or Latino of any race were 3.23% of the population.

There were 399 households, out of which 28.3% had children under the age of 18 living with them, 47.6% were married couples living together, 7.0% had a female householder with no husband present, and 41.6% were non-families. 35.1% of all households were made up of individuals, and 15.0% had someone living alone who was 65 years of age or older. The average household size was 2.35 and the average family size was 3.05.

18.5% are under the age of 18, 37.0% from 18 to 24, 18.6% from 25 to 44, 14.5% from 45 to 64, and 11.3% who were 65 years of age or older. The median age was 23 years. For every 100 females, there were 124.1 males. For every 100 females age 18 and over, there were 128.2 males.

The median income for a household in the city was $28,750, and the median income for a family was $36,250. Males had a median income of $23,750 versus $19,135 for females. The per capita income for the city was $11,131. About 13.2% of families and 16.4% of the population were below the poverty line, including 11.0% of those under age 18 and 13.8% of those age 65 or over.

== Education ==
Fayette is a part of the North Fayette Valley Community School District. It was previously a part of the Fayette Community School District, which merged into the North Fayette Community School District on July 1, 1984. That one in turn merged into the North Fayette Valley district on July 1, 2018.

Fayette is home to Upper Iowa University, which was founded in 1857.

== Notable people ==
- Minnie Bronson, anti-suffragist and General Secretary of the National Association Opposed to Woman Suffrage
- Nellie Burget Miller, writer, clubwoman, and lecturer Poet Laureate of Colorado
- Patrick Murphy, head softball coach at Alabama (1999–present)
