= Volga River (Iowa) =

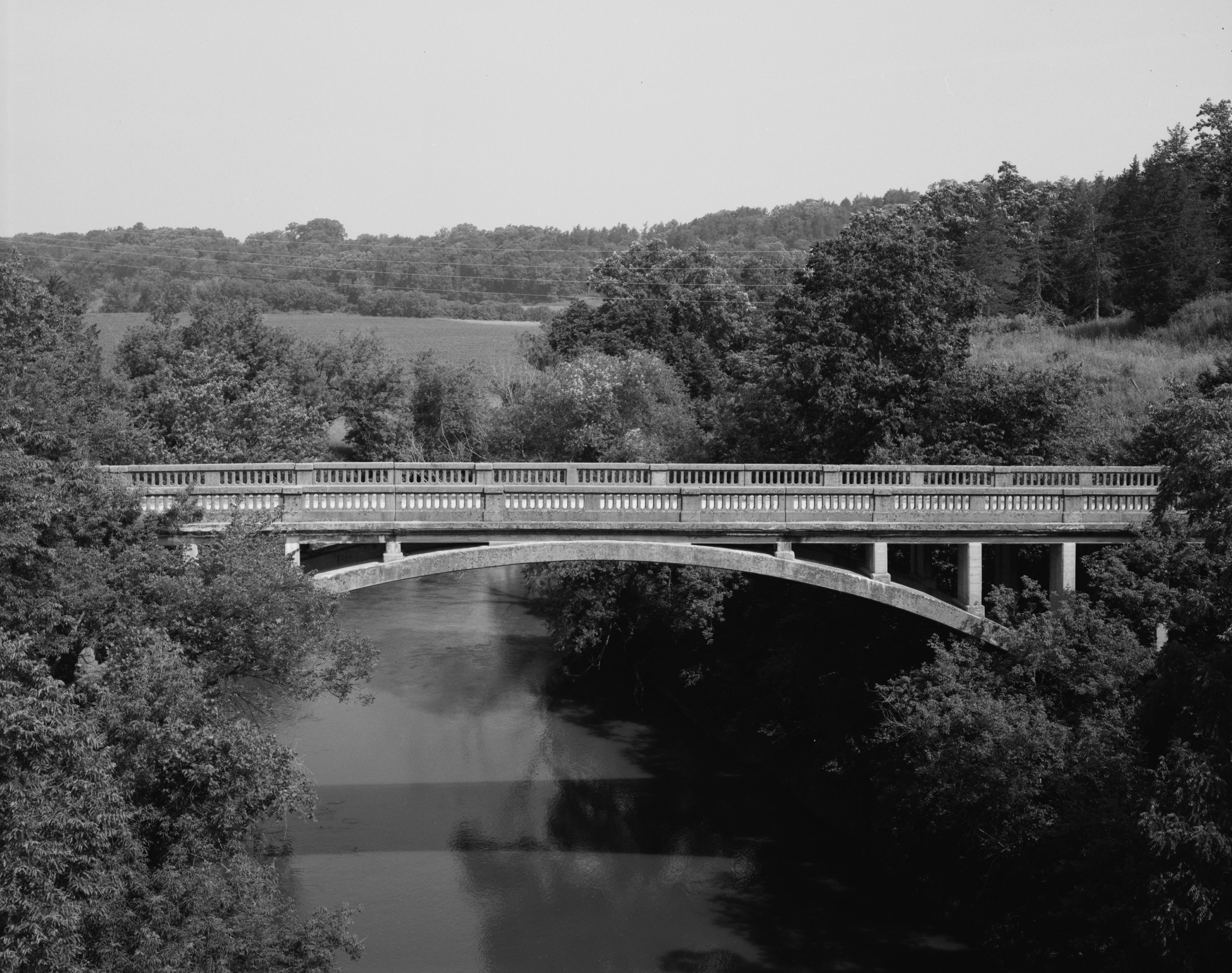
- Mederville Bridge over the Volga River near Elkader

Location
- Country: United States
- State: Iowa
- Counties: Fayette County, Clayton County

Physical characteristics
- Source
  - location: Fayette County, Iowa, United States
  - coordinates: 42.928°N 92.035°W
- Mouth
  - location: Clayton County, Iowa, United States
  - coordinates: 42.749°N 91.270°W
- Discharge
  - location: Littleport, IA
  - average: 339 cu/ft. per sec.

The Volga River is an 80.7-mile-long (129.9 km) river in the U.S. state of Iowa. It is the major tributary of the Turkey River in the northeastern part of the state. The river runs through Fayette and Clayton counties before joining the Turkey River near Elkport. The Turkey River then runs into the Mississippi River near the town of Cassville, Wisconsin. The Volga River State Recreation Area is a state park along the river near Fayette.

== See also ==
- List of Iowa rivers
