= Turkey River (Iowa) =

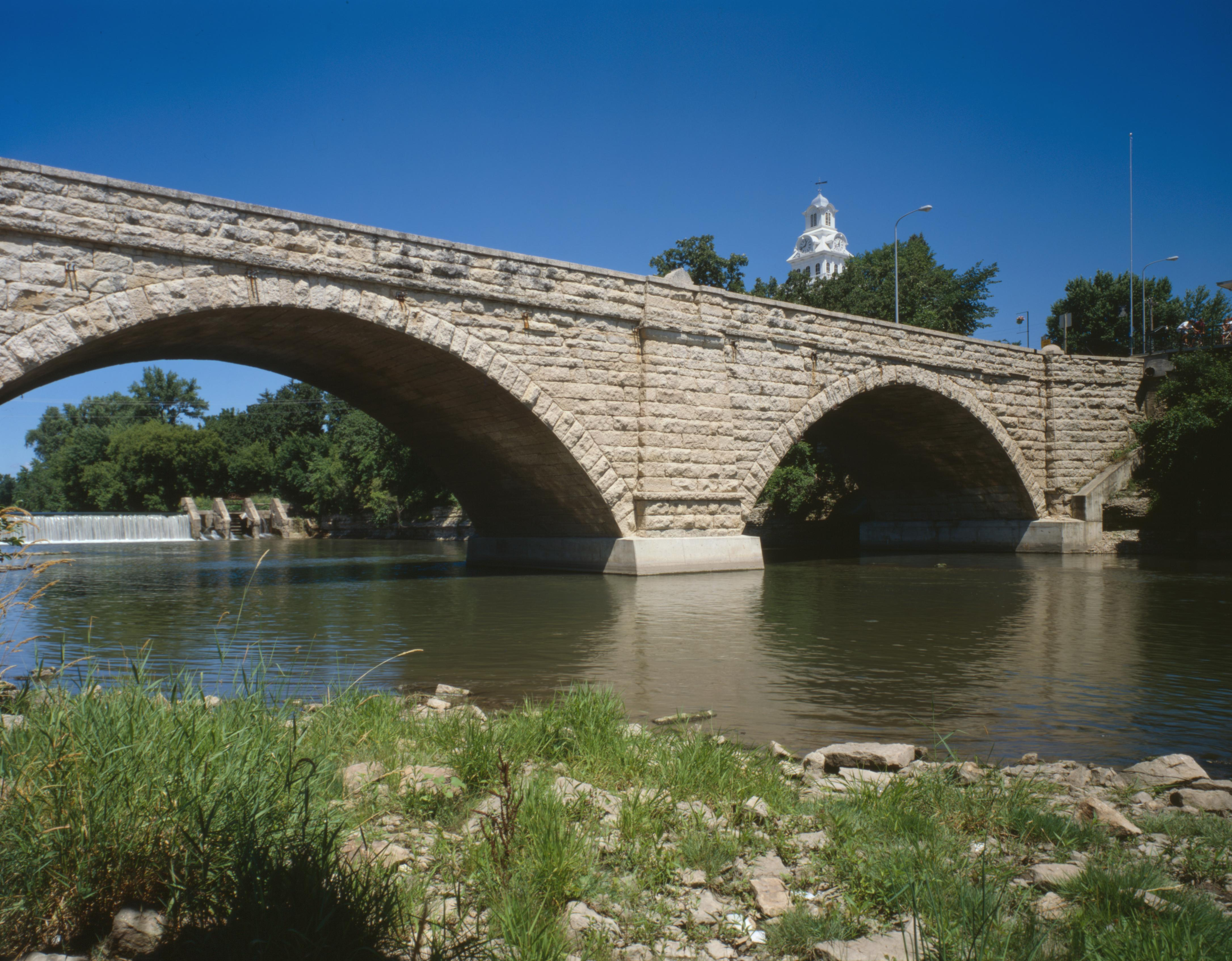
- Keystone Bridge in Elkader

- Turkey River watershed

Location
- Country: US
- State: Iowa
- District: Clayton County, Iowa, Fayette County, Iowa, Winneshiek County, Iowa, Howard County, Iowa

Physical characteristics
- Source
  - coordinates: 43.342°N 92.311°W
- Mouth: Mississippi River
  - coordinates: 42°43′03″N 91°00′43″W
  - elevation: 607 ft (185 m)
- Discharge
  - location: Garber, Iowa
  - average: 1,108 cu/ft. per sec.

Basin features
- Tributaries
  - left: Roberts Creek
  - right: Volga River, Little Turkey River

The Turkey River is a 153-mile-long (246 km) tributary of the upper Mississippi River. Its main branch rises in Howard County, Iowa, near the city of Cresco. The other counties it or its tributaries cover are Chickasaw, Winneshiek, Fayette, Clayton, Delaware, and Dubuque. Tributaries include the Little Turkey River and Crane Creek.

Flowing from northwest to southeast, it flows through or near the cities of Spillville, Fort Atkinson, Eldorado (where it joins with the Little Turkey River), Clermont, Elgin, Elkader, Elkport, Garber, and Millville, before entering the Mississippi south of Guttenberg and across from Cassville, Wisconsin. At its mouth is the community of Turkey River, Iowa, which is named after the river.

The watershed covers 1,083,200 acres (4,384 km^{2}).

== Recreational and wildlife areas ==
- Cardinal Marsh Wildlife Management Area is a few miles southeast of Cresco.
- The mouth of the river is part of the Upper Mississippi River National Wildlife and Fish Refuge.

== See also ==
- List of rivers of Iowa
- Lawrence Bridge (Jackson Junction, Iowa)
