= Passaic River Flood Tunnel =

The Passaic River Flood Tunnel is a proposal for a flood relief tunnel from the central portion of the Passaic River basin in Passaic County, New Jersey in an area where a number of large tributary rivers join the Passaic River and severe flooding occasionally occurs. The tunnel would provide relief to an area that experiences severe flooding events which cause tens of millions in property damage and disruption to lives. The tunnel would stretch from the Wayne, New Jersey area to Newark Bay, a distance of about twenty miles.

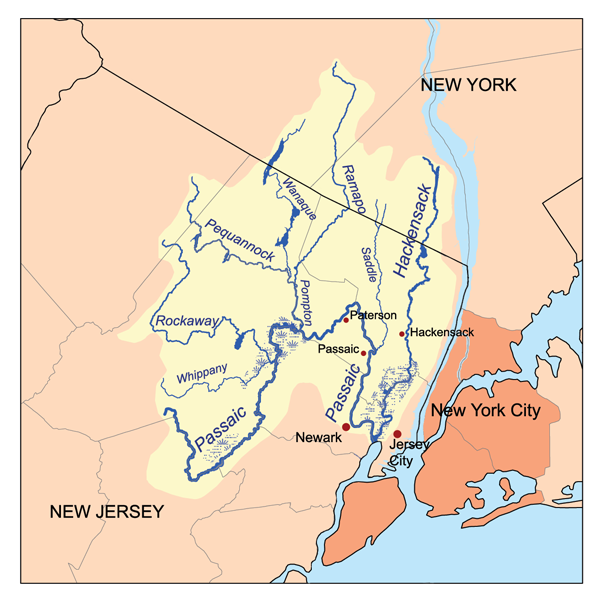
The course, watershed, and tributaries of the Passaic and area of prehistoric Lake Passaic, where flooding occurs regularly

== Origin of tunnel ==
The Passaic River Flood Tunnel idea has its origins in the federally appointed Flood District Commission that existed from 1902 through 1936, and was assigned the task of formulating plans to alleviate persistent flooding in the Passaic River Basin.

== Proposed tunnel plan ==
After several failed proposals over the decades, the modern vision of the Passaic River Flood Tunnel took shape in the mid 1980s as the State of New Jersey selected a modified Army Corps of Engineers preferred alternative: The Pompton/Passaic Dual Inlet Tunnel Diversion Plan. The major elements of the proposed project were a 40-foot-diameter (12 m), 20.1-mile-long (32.3 km) tunnel and a 22-foot-diameter (6.7 m), 1.2-mile-long (1.9 km) spur tunnel, two inlets, one outlet, at least four workshafts along the tunnel pathway, "natural" storage areas, channel modifications, ponding areas, levees, and flood walls. The outlet of the tunnel would be located in Newark Bay, 1,500 feet south of Kearny Point.

The 20.1-mile-long (32.3 km) main tunnel would carry flood waters from the primary inlet at the confluence of the Pequannock, Wanaque, Ramapo, and Pompton Rivers just above the junction with the Passaic River, the area that is most prone to severe flooding in the Passaic River basin. A 1.2-mile-long (1.9 km) spur would carry floodwaters from an inlet along the Passaic River, downstream from Two Bridges, to a connection with the main tunnel beneath the borough of Totowa, New Jersey. A Floodwarning and Forecasting System would be pressed into service to establish operating signals for the tunnel. Most of the major channel modifications would be built near the two tunnel inlets. The modifications would modify several portions of the Passaic, Pompton, Ramapo, Wanaque, and Pequannock Rivers. There are also two interim projects that would be constructed prior to the construction of the flood tunnel. These two projects include major stream alterations, including channelization to the Saddle River and Ramapo River. The cost estimate for the tunnel in the late 1990s was $1.8 billion.

== Current status ==
The State and Federal governments prefer to buy out properties in the Passaic River Basin that are prone to flooding, rather than embark on a large-scale engineering and construction project such as the proposed flood tunnel.
