= Tevin =

Tevin may refer to:

- Tevin (given name)
- Tevin, Kandovan, Iran
- Tovin, Kaghazkonan, Iran

== See also ==
- Teven (disambiguation)
