= Tevin (given name) =

Tevin is a given name.

== Notable people with the name include ==
- Tevin Arona (born 1995), Cook Islands rugby league footballer
- Tevin Brown (born 1998), American basketball player
- Tevin Campbell (born 1976), American singer-songwriter
- Tevin Coleman (born 1993), American football player
- Tevin Elliot (born 1991), American football player and criminal
- Tevin Falzon (born 1992), American basketball player
- Tevin Farmer (born 1990), American boxer
- Tevin Ferris (born 1996) New Zealand rugby union footballer
- Tevin Homer (born 1995), American football player
- Tevin Ihrig (born 1995), German footballer
- Tevin Imlach (born 1996), West Indian cricketer
- Teven Jenkins (born 1998), American football player
- Tevin Jones (born 1992), American football player
- Tevin Kok (born 1996), South African field hockey player
- Tevin Mack (born 1997), American basketball player
- Tevin McDonald (born 1992), American football player
- Tevin Mitchel (born 1992), American football player
- Tevin Reese (born 1991), American football player
- Tevin Shaw (born 1997), Jamaican footballer
- Tevin Slater (born 1994), Saint Vincent and Grenadian footballer
- Tevin Thomas, American musician
- Tevin Vongvanich (born 1958), Thai businessman
- Tevin Washington (born 1990), American football player
- Tevin Westbrook (born 1993), American football player

== See also ==
- Tevaughn, given name
