= Tovin =

Tovin or Tevin (Persian: طوين) may refer to:

- Tovin, Kaghazkonan
- Tevin, Kandovan
