= Teven =

Teven may refer to:

- Teven, New South Wales, Australia
- Teven Jenkins (born 1998), American football player

== See also ==
- Tevin (disambiguation)
