= Carolyn Smith-Meyer =

African-American soprano (1935–2003)

Carolyn Smith-Meyer (born Carolyn Jo Smith, July 17, 1935 – October 26, 2003) was an African-American soprano. Born in Oklahoma City and raised in Topeka, Kansas, she began her professional life as an occupational therapist prior to training as an opera singer in Chicago. She performed frequently in concert versions of operas with the Grant Park Symphony Orchestra during the 1960s and 1970s, and was also a recurring soloist with the Chicago Symphony Orchestra in that period. She began her opera career in Europe at Theater Basel in 1967 and was active as an opera singer in Germany and Switzerland through 1990. She also performed in operas in Poland and Scotland. She is best remembered for being one of the only African American singers to perform the role of Konstanze in Die Entführung aus dem Serail; a role which she sang with the Semperoper which was filmed. She also played Blonde in this same opera in a filmed version made for American television.

== Early life and education ==
The daughter of Matley and Alyce Smith, Carolyn Jo Smith was born on July 17, 1935 in Oklahoma City, Oklahoma. She moved to Topeka, Kansas and attended Topeka Public Schools; graduating from Topeka High School (THS) in 1953. While at THS she sang in the Madrigal Singers and competed in vocal competitions. THS's choir director, Elbert Fly, continued to use Smith as a guest soloist in concerts at THS after she graduated in the mid 1950s. She graduated with Bachelor of Science degree in Occupational Therapy from the University of Kansas, and began her professional life in that field working for the Colmery-O'Neil VA Medical Center in Topeka.

Smith was working as an occupational therapist in Chicago when she married Dr. Ernest Harold Meyer in Switzerland in 1962. In Chicago she began studying singing with the conductor and vocal coach Thomas Peck in 1963. Peck was her primary voice teacher. In 1965 she won second place in the WGN opera competition (founded 1958); an annual competition that was co-sponsored by that radio station with the Illinois Opera Guild. She also won the Society of American Musicians Award early in her career.

== Early career ==
Smith-Meyer began her singing career in the early 1960s working in the chorus attached to the Grant Park Symphony Orchestra (GPSO) which presented annual summer seasons of operas in concert format as well as works from the concert repertoire. She made her professional solo debut in April 1965 as the soprano soloist in both Francis Poulenc's Gloria and Arthur Honegger's Le Roi David with the Chicago Symphony Orchestra (CSO) and the combined choirs of the University of Saint Mary of the Lake and Mundelein College conducted by Stanley R. Rudcki at Orchestra Hall, Chicago.

She made her solo opera debut of sorts in July 1965 as Barbarina in a concert version of Mozart's The Marriage of Figaro with the GPSO led by Julius Rudel. The cast of this performance was largely made up of resident singers from the New York City Opera (NYCO); including Beverly Wolff as Cherubino, Veronica Tyler as Susanna, Richard Fredricks as Count Almaviva, Norma Newton as Countess Almaviva, and Thomas Paul as Figaro. The Chicago Tribune review praised Smith-Meyer for "adding strength to the ensemble".

In 1966 Smith-Meyer performed twice with the CSO; the first time singing the role of Lucy in Gian Carlo Menotti's one-act opera The Telephone with conductor Irwin Hoffman and Edward Pierson in the role of Ben, and the second as the soprano soloist in Verdi's Requiem. Her performance in The Telephone was later filmed and broadcast on the PBS program Chicago Festival on stations like WHYY-TV in 1967. In May 1966 she made her recital debut at Carnegie Hall in New York City with Ivy Lee Beard as her accompanist. In the summer of 1966 she performed arias and duets (again with Pierson) from George Gershwin's Porgy and Bess with the GPSO, and was also heard with that orchestra as a soloist in Mendelssohn's A Midsummer Night's Dream.

== International career ==
In 1967 Smith-Meyer made her European debut and her performance in a fully staged opera at Theater Basel as Gilda in Verdi's Rigoletto. That same year she was named a "Distinguished Kansan" by The Topeka Capital-Journal; an annual honor bestowed by the paper since 1965. In May 1967 she performed again with the CSO as a soloist in Carmina Burana. The following summer sang the role of Cunégonde in a concert version of Leonard Bernstein's Candide with the GPSO, and was also heard with that orchestra as Oscar in a concert version of Verdi's Un ballo in maschera with Plácido Domingo (in his first appearance in Chicago) as Riccardo.

Smith-Meyer sang a filmed recital for PBS's Chicago Festival program which was broadcast in 1968. This program featured her singing arias from Turandot, Madama Butterfly, La traviata, and Porgy and Bess. In May 1968 she was the soprano soloist in the first performance in Chicago of Benjamin Britten's War Requiem with the CSO. That same year she sang the roles of Micaëla in Carmen, Musetta in La bohème, and Bernstein's Cunégonde with the GPSO; also stepping in to replace an ailing Martina Arroyo as Magda de Civry in La rondine. In September 1968 she was the featured soloist with the CSO in a free concert given at Washington Park.

In the 1969-1970 season Smith-Meyer had a major success at the Komische Oper Berlin as Bess in a staged production of Porgy and Bess; and she later returned to perform in several more operas with this company. She repeated Carmina Burana with the CSO in May 1969 with conductor Rafael Frühbeck de Burgos. That same month she appeared as Puccini's Musetta at the Grand Theatre, Warsaw in Poland. In the summer of 1969 she performed Beethoven's Egmont with the GPSO, and appeared at the Ravinia Festival as the High Priestess in Aida with Arroyo in the title role.

In 1970 Smith-Meyer portrayed Blonde in a television of Mozart's Die Entführung aus dem Serail made by National Educational Television. She returned to Chicago ti sing roles in several more operas presented in concert format with the GPSO; including The Foreign Princess in Rusalka (1970), Belinda in Dido and Aeneas (1971), Mařenka in The Bartered Bride (1972), and Norina in Don Pasquale (1973). On December 20, 1974 she created the role of Clarissa in the world premiere of Rainer Kunad's Sabellicus at the Berlin State Opera with Karl Heinz Stryczek in the title role.

In 1976 she starred in director Harry Kupfer's staging of Mozart's Die Entführung aus dem Serail in Dresden with the Saxon State Opera under the baton of Herbert Blomstedt. In a 2019 publication, researcher Julia Katarzyna Szołtysek stated of Smith-Meyer's performance that she was "if not the only, then surely one of the very few, African-American Konstanzas to-date". She repeated the role of Konstanza with the Dresden company on tour to the Edinburgh International Festival in 1982. Werner Haseleu was the Pasha in this Edinburgh cast. The Dresden production was filmed at the Semperoper with conductor Peter Gülke and Smith-Meyer as Konstanze. It was released on VHS in 1980.

From the late 1970s until 1985 Smith-Meyer performed regularly with Oper Frankfurt. After this she sang with Theater Bremen until 1990. In Europe she was known for her performances of African American spirituals on the concert stage.

== Death ==
She died in Germany on October, 26, 2003.
