= Margaret Hill McCarter =

American novelist

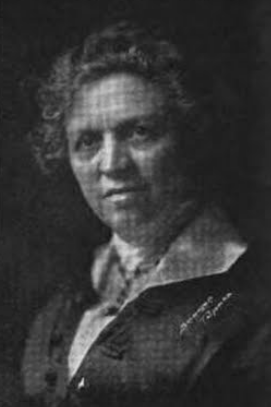
- Margaret Hill McCarter, from a 1915 publication.
- Born: May 2, 1860; Carthage, Indiana
- Died: August 31, 1938 (aged 78); Topeka, Kansas
- Occupations: Teacher, writer

Margaret Hill McCarter (May 2, 1860 – August 31, 1938) was an American teacher and novelist. She was the best-known and highest-paid novelist in Kansas at the time.

== Biography ==
Born Margaret Hill near Carthage, Indiana to Quaker parents Thomas Thornbury Hill and Nancy (Davis), she was educated at public schools in Indiana then at the Quaker school Earlham College. Margaret attended the State Normal School at Terre Haute, Indiana, studying Latin, English and history; earning an A.B. in 1884. She became the principal of the high school in Rensselaer, Indiana, then head of the English department at the Goshen, Indiana high school. In 1888 she was hired to head the English department at Topeka High School in Topeka, Kansas, remaining at that post for the next six years.

She married William Arthur Carter, a doctor, on June 5, 1890, and the couple had three children. In 1894 she founded Western Sorosis, a women's club. Margaret became a writer in 1901; contributing articles for newspapers and magazines. Her first novel, The cottonwood's story was published in 1903. She became the best known and highest paid novelist in Kansas for her time. Her novels were historical fiction tales about Kansas, and featured an "anti-Indian" theme. She was a staunch Republican and was invited to speak at the 1920 Republican National Convention in Chicago, becoming the first woman ever to do so.

Margaret died in Topeka, Kansas and is buried there. During her career she was awarded with honorary doctorates from Washburn University and the College of Emporia; both in Kansas. Margaret Hill McCarter Elementary School in Topeka is named after her.

== Bibliography ==
- A bunch of things, tied up with strings (1901)
- The cottonwood's story (1903)
- The overflowing waters (1903)
- Cuddy's baby (1907)
- In old Quivira (1908)
- Cuddy and other stories (1908)
- The price of the prairie: a story of Kansas (1910)
- The peace of Solomon Valley (1911)
- A wall of men (1912)
- A Master's Degree (1913)
- Winning of the wilderness (1914)
- The cornerstone (1915)
- Vanguards of the plains, a romance of the Santa Fe trail (1917)
- The reclaimers (1918)
- Homeland: a present-day love story (1922)
- Widening waters (1924)
- The candle in the window (1925)
