= Howard S. Searle =

- Born: October 24, 1891; Edgar, Nebraska
- Died: September 8, 1972 (aged 80); Topeka, Kansas
- Allegiance: United States
- Service / branch: United States Army
- Rank: Brigadier General
- Battles / wars: World War I World War II
- Awards: Legion of Merit; Bronze Star Medal

Brigadier General Howard Sanford Searle (October 24, 1891 – September 8, 1972) was a decorated Kansas National Guard officer who was responsible for rebuilding the Kansas Army National Guard after World War II and leading the response to two major natural disasters in the state in the 1950s, the Great Flood in Kansas City in 1951 and the tornado that destroyed much of Udall, Kansas in 1955.

== Biography ==
Searle was born in Edgar, Nebraska and raised in Kansas. He graduated from Topeka High School and Washburn University with an A.B. in 1914 and an L.L.B. in 1916. During his time at Washburn, he was elected sophomore class president, was a member of the Kansas Beta chapter of Phi Delta Theta (ΦΔΘ) and was initiated into the school's prestigious Sagamore Society.

=== World War I ===
A year after graduating from Washburn, Searle enlisted in the Kansas National Guard as a private on September 24, 1917, and was assigned to Headquarters & Headquarters Battery, 130th Field Artillery Regiment. He was commissioned a second lieutenant in the Coast Artillery Corps on November 1, 1918 until leaving service on January 12, 1919.

=== Interwar period ===
Searle held a commission in the Field Artillery Officers' Reserve Corps from April 6, 1921 to April 17, 1927, rising to the rank of captain. On June 11, 1923, he was commissioned a captain of field artillery in the Kansas National Guard, Headquarters Battery, 60th Field Artillery Brigade, being promoted to major on January 11, 1930. On October 7, 1932, he switched to the Ordnance Department as a lieutenant colonel and ordnance officer of the 35th Division, moving back to the field artillery on March 7, 1939 as operations and training officer (G-3) of the 35th Division.

=== World War II ===
Searle was mobilized on December 23, 1940 for World War II. He later served as personnel officer and then deputy chief of staff for VII Corps commander Major General J. Lawton Collins.

=== Cold War ===
After the war, Searle became a brigadier general in the Kansas National Guard in October 1946, and was assigned the responsibility of re-establishing the Kansas National Guard across Kansas. He was also assigned as assistant division commander, 35th Infantry Division. In the early to mid-1950s, General Searle was responsible for managing the response to several natural disasters in Kansas. In 1951, he handled the recovery after the Great Flood in Kansas City. The flood resulted in nearly $7 billion in damage (in 2005 dollars) and the loss of 28 lives. In 1955, he oversaw recovery efforts in Udall, Kansas after a tornado destroyed much of the town killing 77 people and injuring 270 others.

=== Death ===
Searle died on September 8, 1972 at the age of 80 in a Topeka, Kansas, hospital, after suffering a stroke.

== Awards and honors ==
General Searle's military decorations included the Legion of Merit, Bronze Star Medal, the French Legion of Honor and the Croix de Guerre with Palm.

In 1951, Washburn honored Searle with its Distinguished Service Award. In 1962, Searle was named the Topeka Phi Delta Theta Alumni Association's "Phi of the Year." In 1967, he was again honored by Washburn this time with an honorary doctorate of laws degree. In 1981, the Kansas Army National Guard posthumously inducted him into its Hall of Fame.
