= Ruth Garver Gagliardo =

American advocate for library services

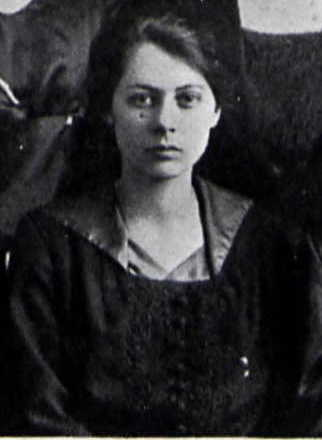
- Born: September 6, 1895; Hastings
- Died: January 4, 1980; Wichita
- Education: University of Kansas
- Occupations: Librarian, editor

Ruth Garver Gagliardo (September 6, 1895 – January 4, 1980) was an American educator known for her work in developing library services for children. Gagliardo was referred to as the "Kansas Book Lady" for her efforts in promoting books and advocating for resources for teachers and parents. She held several prominent leadership roles in national organizations, including serving as the vice president of the National Parent Teacher Association and as president of the Association for Library Service to Children. Gagliardo's creation of a traveling book exhibit is credited with the start of book fairs in the United States.

== Early life and education ==
Ruth Jane Garver was born in Hastings, Nebraska, on September 6, 1895. Her father, a traveling minister, died before her birth; her mother remarried when Ruth was seven and the family moved to Topeka, Kansas in 1910. Her mother inspired a love of literature in her and her brother and Ruth collected children's books as a young girl. In 1914, she graduated from Topeka High School, after serving as the school yearbook's editor-in-chief.

After being trained to teach at a normal school, she taught at several rural schools. She developed the library of Culver High School, leading to its accreditation; since Garver didn't have a teaching certificate, she could no longer continue working at the school. She began her undergraduate degree at the University of Kansas in 1918, graduating with a bachelor's degree in English in 1922.

== Career ==
After graduating from the University of Kansas, Gagliardo went to work as a reporter for the Emporia Gazette. In this role she also acted as a part-time personal secretary for editor William Allen White; White talked with many writers and politicians, ensuring that Gagliardo met them all. She covered art, music, and book events and devoted many columns to children's books, which made the Gazette one of the first newspapers to regularly review children's books. Gagliardo moved to Lawrence in 1925, becoming a freelance writer and raising her three children with her husband, Domenico Gagliardo. She maintained her close relationship with William Allen White, and when White died in 1944, she began efforts to start an award to honor him. The William Allen White Children's Book Award is awarded by a vote of Kansas schoolchildren; it was the first statewide children's choice book award established in the United States.

In 1942 Gagliardo volunteered to write a book review column for the Kansas Teacher, an educational journal published by the Kansas State Teachers Association. The column ran for twenty-five years. She traveled throughout the state, bringing an exhibit of selected books to schools and libraries. Gagliardo's creation, the Kansas Children's Traveling Book Exhibit, is credited with beginning book fairs in the U.S. Her enthusiastic talks while touring with the 700 books often led to school officials committing to provide more funding for books. Gagliardo became a paid employee of the Kansas State Teachers Association in 1947, becoming the director of library services.

Gagliardo became known as the "Kansas Book Lady" because of her tireless promotion of books through multiple venues, including speeches, newspaper and journal columns, and book reviews. From 1947 to 1955 she ran a monthly radio program focusing on books for the University of Kansas. She worked with many organizations to start book and reading programs, including UNESCO and the U.S. Department of State. Gagliardo was active in multiple professional organizations; some of her most significant roles were serving as the vice president for the National Parent Teacher Association as well as director of the National Parent-Teacher Magazine.

She was very active in the American Library Association, chairing the Newbery and Caldecott Committee in 1962 and the following year serving as the president of the ALA's Children's Services Division (now called the Association for Library Service to Children).

In 1960 she testified before the U.S. Congress as a witness arguing for the extension of the Library Services Act, saying the funding provided to libraries was "a means of equalizing opportunity for all children". She also served as the state representative for Kansas at the White House Conference on Children and Youth in 1950 and 1960. Her 1962 anthology Let's read aloud focused on the importance of families reading together. Gagliardo retired in 1966.

== Death and legacy ==
In 1967, Gagliardo received a Distinguished Service Citation from the University of Kansas. She was inducted into the National Education Association Hall of Fame for American Women in 1976.

Gagliardo died in Wichita, Kansas on January 5, 1980. After her death, author Mary Francis Shura discussed Gagliardo's legacy:

In a world where so many take inordinate pride in small achievements, her humorous, low-key humility was a classic lesson. Yet she is immortal in her field as she so richly deserves to be. By founding the William Allen White Award she has given the field both a memorial to a man who should not be forgotten and the example of a brilliant woman whose life could make a difference long past the brief span of a human life.

Since 1964 the Ruth Garver Gagliardo School Library Scholarship has been awarded annually to a masters student by the Kansas Association of School Librarians.

Her papers are at the Emporia State University Libraries & Archives and the University of Kansas Kenneth Spencer Research Library Archival Collections.
