= Tevaughn =

Tevaughn is a masculine given name. Notable people with the name include:

- Tevaughn Campbell (born 1993), Canadian professional football player
- Tevaughn Harriette (born 1995), Antigua and Barbudan footballer
