= Teven Jenkins =

American football player (born 1998)

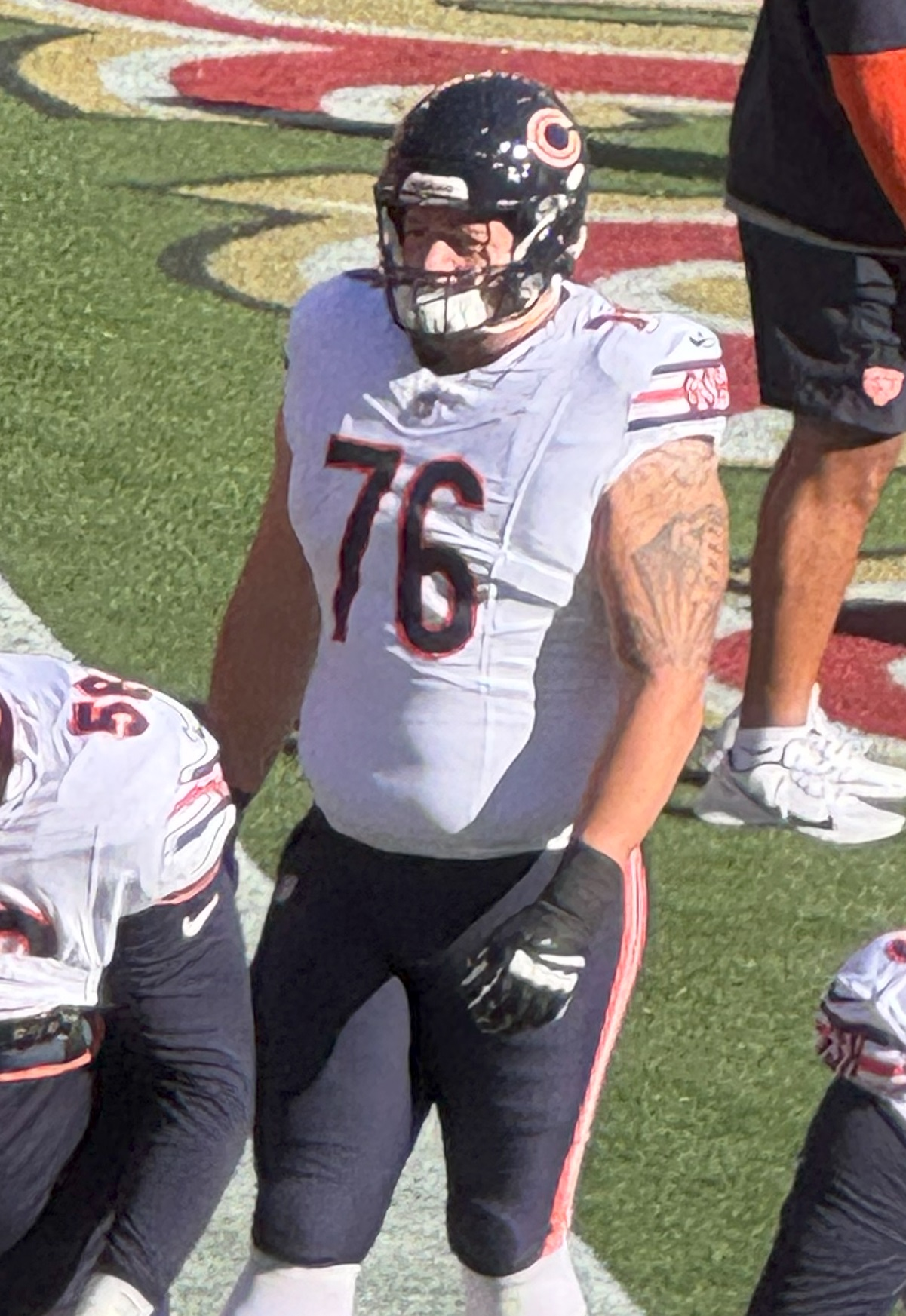
- Jenkins with the Chicago Bears in 2024

No. 78 – Cleveland Browns
- Position: Guard
- Roster status: Injured reserve

Personal information
- Born: March 3, 1998 (age 28); Topeka, Kansas, U.S.
- Listed height: 6 ft 6 in (1.98 m)
- Listed weight: 321 lb (146 kg)

Career information
- High school: Topeka
- College: Oklahoma State (2016–2020)
- NFL draft: 2021: 2nd round, 39th overall pick

Career history
- Chicago Bears (2021–2024); Cleveland Browns (2025–present)

Awards and highlights
- First-team All-Big 12 (2020)

Career NFL statistics as of 2026
- Games played: 62
- Games started: 42
- Stats at Pro Football Reference

Teven Bradlee Jenkins (born March 3, 1998) is an American professional football guard for the Cleveland Browns of the National Football League (NFL). He played college football for the Oklahoma State Cowboys and was selected by the Chicago Bears in the second round of the 2021 NFL draft.

== Early life ==
Jenkins was born and grew up in Topeka, Kansas, and attended Topeka High School, where he played baseball, basketball and football. He was named All-State in his junior and senior seasons. Jenkins was rated a three-star recruit and committed to play college football at Oklahoma State over offers from Kansas State, Louisville, Missouri and Nebraska.

== College career ==
Jenkins redshirted his true freshman season. He played in twelve games with three starts the following season. Jenkins was named the Cowboys starting right tackle going into his redshirt sophomore season and was named honorable mention All-Big 12 Conference after starting all 13 of the team's games, with three starts coming at left tackle due to an injury to regular starter Arlington Hambright. He was again named honorable mention All-Big 12 after his redshirt junior season. He started every game as a senior and was named to the 2020 All-Big 12 Conference football team.

== Professional career ==
Pre-draft measurables
Height	Weight	Arm length	Hand span	Wingspan	40-yard dash	10-yard split	20-yard split	20-yard shuttle	Three-cone drill	Vertical jump	Broad jump	Bench press
6 ft 5 7/8 in (1.98 m)	317 lb (144 kg)	33 1/2 in (0.85 m)	9 1/2 in (0.24 m)	6 ft 9 in (2.06 m)	5.01 s	1.77 s	2.88 s	4.68 s	7.69 s	32.5 in (0.83 m)	8 ft 10 in (2.69 m)	36 reps
All values from Pro Day

=== Chicago Bears ===
Jenkins was selected by the Chicago Bears in the second round (39th overall) of the 2021 NFL draft. He signed his four-year rookie contract with Chicago on June 16, 2021. He was placed on injured reserve on September 1 after undergoing back surgery. He was activated on December 4, and debuted on special teams for the Bears against the Arizona Cardinals on December 5. Jenkins saw his first career plays on offense during Week 14, after left tackle Jason Peters suffered an injury. Jenkins made his first NFL career start the next week, against the Minnesota Vikings.

During the 2022 preseason, the Bears chose to switch Jenkins from offensive tackle to right guard. He started 11 games at right guard before being placed on injured reserve on January 4, 2023.

On April 11, 2023, Jenkins announced that he would be moving to left guard for the upcoming season, ceding the right guard position to offseason signee Nate Davis. Due to a calf injury, he was placed on injured reserve on August 31. Jenkins was activated for their Week 5 game against the Washington Commanders.

=== Cleveland Browns ===
On March 20, 2025, Jenkins signed with the Cleveland Browns on a one-year, $3.1 million contract. He began the season as a backup guard behind Joel Bitonio and Wyatt Teller. He started four of the final five games at right guard in place of an injured Teller.

On March 10, 2026, Jenkins re-signed with the Browns on a one-year, $4 million contract. He was placed on injured reserve on October 24.
