= List of universities in the United Kingdom by date of foundation =

This is a list of universities in the United Kingdom by the date of their foundation as universities.

In many cases the supposed date of foundation as a university is open to debate, particularly for the ancient universities. Modern universities have seen similar debate, with some universities having a heritage as educational institutions that pre-dates their current foundation or recognition as a university by over a hundred years, e.g. the use of 'Est 1824' on the University of Manchester logo, reflecting the initial foundations of the Manchester Mechanics' Institute and the Manchester Royal School of Medicine in that year, despite the current foundation having been established (by the merger of two existing universities) in 2004. For the modern (post 1800) universities, the date of achieving university status (by royal charter, act of parliament, order in council, or decision of Companies House) is given. Former universities with extant successor institutions in the UK are given in italics.

== Ancient universities ==
Until the nineteenth century there were only two successful long-term university establishments in England and five in Scotland (including two in Aberdeen, see below). This excludes other attempts to establish medieval studia in Northampton, which received migrations of scholars from Oxford in 1238, Cambridge in 1260 (encouraged by a royal charter in 1261) and Oxford again in 1263, but was then closed by royal decree in 1265, Salisbury, which similarly received a migration from Oxford in 1238 and was still in existence in 1278 but vanished by 1300, and in Stamford from 1333 to 1335, none of which ever attained recognition as a university, and Cromwell's New College, Durham, which existed from 1653-1660 but was not granted degree-awarding powers after opposition from Oxford and Cambridge and was closed at the restoration of the monarchy.

Name	Country	Date of foundation	Motto	Notes
University of Oxford	England	1200–1214	Dominus illuminatio mea (The Lord is my light)	The earliest record of teaching in Oxford is from the late 11th century, with schools established by the mid-12th century. These organised into a university from c. 1200, with statutes given by a legatine charter in 1214. University by ancient usage. Earliest royal charter, sometimes referred to as the Magna Carta of the university, 1244.
University of Cambridge	England	1209–1226	Hinc lucem et pocula sacra (From here, light and sacred draughts)	University by ancient usage. Earliest royal charter (1231) of any UK university.
University of St Andrews	Scotland	1410 – 1413	ΑΙΕΝ ΑΡΙΣΤΕΥΕΙΝ (Ever to Excel)	Foundation as a university by papal bull in 1413, after teaching began in 1410 and the institute was incorporated by a charter of Bishop Henry Wardlaw in 1411. The university uses 1413 as its date of foundation. Royal Charter in 1532.
University of Glasgow	Scotland	1451	Via, Veritas, Vita (The way, the truth, the life)	Founded by papal bull issued 7 January 1451. Note this is 1450 Old Style, which is the year given in some sources. Royal Charter 1453.
University of Aberdeen	Scotland	1495–1505	Initium sapientiae timor domini (The beginning of wisdom is fear of the Lord)	Founded by papal bull in 1495 and a charter from Bishop William Elphinstone in 1505 as King's College, Aberdeen, with the status of a university. A royal charter was also issued in 1495. The university uses 1495 as its date of foundation. Merged with Marischal College (founded 1593) by act of parliament to form the University of Aberdeen in 1860, explicitly maintaining the precedence of King's College.
University of Edinburgh	Scotland	1583		Edinburgh Town Council granted a royal charter by James VI in April 1582 as the first college established by secular authorities in Scotland. Instruction began in October 1583. Attempts in the 17th century to gain a royal charter for the university itself (as opposed to the town council) failed due to the overthrow of James II and VII. Incorporated and made independent by the Universities (Scotland) Act 1858.
Marischal College	Scotland	1593 to 1860		Founded by George Keith, 5th Earl Marischal, later confirmed by act of parliament. Merged into the University of Aberdeen in 1860.

== Nineteenth-century universities ==
No new universities were successfully founded in England or Scotland after 1600 until the nineteenth century, although the eighteenth century saw the establishment of a number of dissenting academies, medical schools such as St George's (1733) and the London Hospital Medical College (1785), and the Royal Veterinary College (1791).

Name	University status	Motto	Notes
Durham University	1832	Fundamenta eius super montibus sanctis (Her foundations are upon the holy hills)	Given university status from Durham University Act 1832 rather than the later 1837 royal charter.
University of London	1836		First British university to be founded via a charter of incorporation, with King's College and University College as founding colleges. See below
Queen's University of Ireland	1850 to 1882		Founded as the university of the three "Queen's Colleges" of Belfast, Cork, and Galway, all established 1845. These colleges survive today as Queen's University Belfast, University College Cork and NUI Galway.
Royal University of Ireland	1880 to 1909		Established on the model of the University of London; the successor to the Queen's University of Ireland, comprising the three Queen's Colleges, as well as Magee College, University College Dublin, Catholic University Medical School, St. Patrick's College, Maynooth and Blackrock College. Dissolved in 1909, replaced by the National University of Ireland and Queen's University Belfast.
Victoria University	1880 to 1903	Olim armis nunc studiis (Formerly by weapons, now by studies)	Federal university with its seat in Manchester, comprising colleges in Manchester (1880–1903), Liverpool (1884–1903) and Leeds (1887–1903). Merged with Owen's College, Manchester to form the Victoria University of Manchester in 1903. Current successor institute is the University of Manchester
University of Wales	1893	Goreu Awen Gwirionedd (The best inspiration is truth)	See below

The University of Wales and the Victoria University were founded as federal universities incorporating earlier colleges and the University of London was founded as an examination board (becoming a federal university in 1900). The federal universities are discussed further below.

The Andersonian Institute, a precursor of the University of Strathclyde, was established in 1796 and used the title Anderson's University between 1828 and 1887, but the University of Strathclyde did not receive a royal charter granting university status until 1964. Similarly, University College London used the title London University without being granted university status from 1826 to 1836. Both St Patrick's College, Maynooth (from 1896) and the Catholic University of Ireland (1854–1911) were universities by Papal Bull but were never recognised as such by the British state.

== Civic universities ==
These universities were distinguished by being non-collegiate (and thus, at the time, non-residential) institutions founded as university colleges that admitted men without reference to religion and concentrated on imparting to their students "real-world" skills, often linked to engineering. All were established as universities by royal charter, with an accompanying act of Parliament to transfer the property and assets of the university college to the newly incorporated university. As this article lists universities by date of foundation, this section lists only the universities that gained their status in the period 1900–1959. There are some institutions generally regarded as civic universities and sharing many elements of common history with these universities that gained university status later than this (e.g. Newcastle in 1963 or Cardiff in 2005); these are listed under the appropriate time period.

=== First wave of civic universities ===
The large civic "redbrick" universities all gained official university status before the First World War. The term was first coined by a professor at the University of Liverpool to describe these universities, inspired by the university's Victoria Building which is built from a distinctive red pressed brick. All of the redbrick institutions in Great Britain have origins dating back to older medical or engineering colleges which prepared students for University of London external examination; many were also members of the federal Victoria University for a period.

Name	University status	Motto	Notes
University of Birmingham	1900	Per ardua ad alta (Through efforts to heights)	The first civic university to be awarded full university status and the first unitary (not collegiate or federal) university in England. Formed following the merge of Mason Science College (founded 1875) and Queen's College, Birmingham (founded 1828).
Victoria University of Manchester	1903	Arduus ad solem (Striving towards the sun)	From merger of Owen's College (constituent college of the Victoria University from 1880) and the Victoria University. Merged with UMIST in 2004 to form the University of Manchester.
University of Liverpool	1903	Haec otia studia fovent (These days of peace foster learning)	Formerly a constituent college of the Victoria University from 1884.
University of Leeds	1904	Et augebitur scientia (And knowledge will be increased)	Formerly a constituent college of the Victoria University from 1887.
University of Sheffield	1905	Rerum cognoscere causas (To discover the causes of things)	
Queen's University Belfast	1908	Pro tanto quid retribuamus (For so much, what shall we give back?)	Founded in 1845–50 as Queen's College, Belfast; part of the Queen's University of Ireland 1850–1880 and the Royal University of Ireland 1880–1908.
University of Bristol	1909	Vim promovet insitam ([Learning] promotes one's innate power)	Founded in 1876 as University College, Bristol and (from 1893) incorporating the Bristol Medical School, founded in 1833

=== Second wave of civic universities ===
The second wave of civic universities differed from the later "plate glass universities" in that they all evolved from local university colleges founded before the Second World War and all prepared students for external University of London examinations before being granted full university status. They are distinguished from the "red brick" universities only by their date of foundation as universities, and are often classed together.

Name	University status	Motto	Notes
University of Reading	1926		Developed from University College Reading, founded by Christ Church, Oxford as an extension college in 1892. Students could take Oxford degrees after completing their courses at Reading with only one year of residence.
University of Nottingham	1948	Sapientia urbs conditur (A city is built on wisdom)	Developed from University College Nottingham, founded in 1881.
University of Southampton	1952	Strenuis ardua cedunt (The heights yield to endeavour)	Developed from the Hartley Institute (Hartley University College from 1902).
University of Hull	1954	Lampada ferens (Bearing the torch [of learning])	Developed from University College Hull, which prepared students for University of London external examinations founded in 1927.
University of Exeter	1955	Lucem sequimur (We follow the light)	Developed from University College of the South West of England, founded in 1922, an external college of the University of London; traces its origins back to Exeter School of Art, founded in 1855.
University of Leicester	1957	Ut vitam habeant (So that they may have life)	Developed from Leicestershire and Rutland University College, founded in 1921 (University College, Leicester from 1927)

== 1960s universities ==
The 1960s saw the number of UK universities more than double from 22 to 45. Universities founded during the 1960s divide into two main groups: the plateglass universities, so called because of their dominant architectural style, and the former colleges of advanced technology that were converted to universities following the Robbins Report.

The plate glass universities are differentiated from the civic universities by not having been university colleges submitting students for external examination, but instead being created ab initio as universities with their own degree-awarding powers (under the supervision of academic oversight councils). The decision to create the plateglass universities was taken prior to the Robbins Report, and the report mentions them as being in the process of being established (Chapter IV). The approach of creating institutions with degree-awarding powers was pioneered by the University of Keele, which was established in 1949 as the University College of North Staffordshire with its own degree award powers, under the oversight of Oxford, Manchester and Birmingham.

The status of college of advanced technology (CAT) was created in the 1950s, although many of the institutes so designated dated back much further. The CATs were distinct from university colleges (although like them they prepared students for London degrees) and, along with their Scottish counterparts, were recommended to be converted into universities by the Robbins Report (Chapter X). They all entered the university sector in the 1960s, although some became colleges of federal universities rather than universities in their own right.

In addition to these, some civic universities (Dundee, Newcastle and, arguably, Keele) gained university status in this period. Dundee and Newcastle were, like the redbrick universities, recognised as university colleges from the start of the grant-in-aid programme in 1889, making them the last of the first-wave civic universities to become universities in their own right. Keele was founded as a university college, although (as mentioned above) with its own degree awarding powers, and was considered to be a second-wave civic university by Robbins. The Open University is also unusual, being the UK's only public distance learning university.

Name	University status	Motto	Notes
University of Sussex	1961	Be still and know	
University of Keele	1962 (Note: Robbins Report, p24)	Thanke God for All	Developed from University College of North Staffordshire, founded in 1949 with degree awarding powers. Keele is not a plate glass university, not having been created as a university ab initio, and was considered a "younger civic university" by Robbins. It is listed here as it gained university status in the 1960s.
University of East Anglia	1963	Do Different	
University of York	1963	In limine sapientiae (On the threshold of wisdom)	York is a collegiate university and is made up of eleven colleges
Newcastle University	1963	Mens agitat molem (Mind moves matter)	Traces its origins back to medical school founded in 1834 and associated with Durham University from the mid 19th century. Part of the federal University of Durham from 1908 to 1963. Became an independent university in 1963 by act of parliament and does not have a royal charter. Its city-centre location, architecture, and history as a nineteenth century university college make Newcastle more similar to the redbricks than the plateglass universities, and it is often referred to as redbrick or a civic university.
Lancaster University	1964	Patet omnibus veritas (Truth lies open to all)	Lancaster is a collegiate university and is made up of nine colleges
University of Strathclyde	1964	The place of useful learning	Traces its origins back to the Andersonian Institute founded in 1796; used the title Anderson's University between 1828 and 1887 but did not receive a royal charter as a university until 1964. As the Royal College of Science and Technology (1956–1964) it educated students for degrees awarded by the University of Glasgow.
University of Kent	1965 to 2026	Cui servire regnare est (Whom to serve is to reign)	Merged with University of Greenwich to form London and South East University Group in August 2026
University of Essex	1965	Thought the harder, heart the keener	
University of Warwick	1965	Mens agitat molem (Mind moves matter)	
Loughborough University	1966	Veritate, scientia, labore (By truth, wisdom, and labour)	Traces its origins back to 1909 as the Loughborough Technical Institute
Aston University	1966	Forward	Traces its origins back to 1895 as the Birmingham Municipal Technical School
Brunel University of London	1966		Traces its origins to Acton Technical College, which was founded in 1928, as well as Borough Road College and Maria Grey College
University of Surrey	1966		Traces its origins back to Battersea Polytechnic Institute which was founded in 1891
University of Bath	1966	Generatim discite cultus (Learn the culture proper to each after its kind)	Traces its origins to the Bristol Trade School of 1856
University of Bradford	1966	Give Invention Light or Make Knowledge Work	Traces its origins back to the Bradford Mechanics Institute, founded in 1832
City University London	1966 – 2016	To serve mankind	Founded in 1894 as the Northampton Institute. Joined the University of London in 2016, ceasing to be a university in its own right and becoming City, University of London (see listing of University of London colleges below).
Heriot-Watt University	1966		Originally established in 1821 as the School of Arts of Edinburgh but was not given a royal charter or university status
University of Salford	1967	Altiora petamus (Let us seek higher things)	Origins can be traced to 1896 with the opening of the Royal Technical Institute, Salford
University of Dundee	1967	Magnificat anima mea dominum (My soul doth magnify the Lord)	Traces its origins back to University College, Dundee founded in 1881; part of St Andrews from 1897 to 1967
University of Stirling	1967		
New University of Ulster	1968 to 1984		Merged with Ulster Polytechnic to form University of Ulster in 1984
The Open University	1969	Live and Learn	

The New University of Ulster (NUU), which incorporated Magee College originating in 1865, was founded in 1968, but subsequently merged with the Ulster Polytechnic to form the University of Ulster (see below).

== 1980s universities ==
After the explosion in university numbers of the 1960s, no new universities were established until the 1980s. Both of the 1980s universities are unusual: the University of Buckingham was Britain's first private university since the creation of the University Grants Committee after the First World War extended state funding to Oxford, Cambridge and Durham, while Ulster University was formed from the merger of a plate glass university with a polytechnic.

Name	University status	Motto	Notes
University of Buckingham	1983	Flying on our own Wings	Founded as the University College at Buckingham in 1973. First private university in the UK, and the only one established by royal charter
University of Ulster	1984		Formed by the merger of the New University of Ulster (founded 1968) and Ulster Polytechnic; in 2014 it re-branded as Ulster University.

== 1990s universities ==
The passage of the Further and Higher Education Act 1992 allowed all polytechnics and Scottish central institutions to become universities and award their own degrees rather than degrees governed by the Council for National Academic Awards (CNAA). Thirty-eight (including institutions later merged) took up the offer immediately, nearly doubling the number universities again from 46 to 84 (and 89 by 1994). While commonly referred to as "post-1992 universities" (or new universities), many of these institutions claim heritage back to the nineteenth century.

Cranfield and UMIST (now merged into Manchester) both achieved university status in this period via royal charter rather than under the provisions of the 1992 act and are not generally regarded as "new universities". They are listed here with the 1992 universities to reflect the date when they gained their status.

Due to the way in which these universities were created only days apart, all of the universities created in 1992 are listed alphabetically.

Name	University status	Motto	Notes
Anglia Ruskin University	1992	A creative constellation	Founded as Cambridge School of Art 1858; polytechnic 1991. Renamed Anglia Ruskin University in 2005.
Birmingham City University	16 June 1992	Age quod agis (Do what you are doing; attend to your business)	Founded as City of Birmingham Polytechnic 1971; until 2007 was called University of Central England
Bournemouth University	27 November 1992	Discere mutari est (To learn is to change)	
University of Brighton	1992		Founded as Brighton Polytechnic 1968
University of Lancashire	1992	Ex solo ad solem (From the earth to the sun)	Formerly The University of Central Lancashire (UCLan) until 2025. Was previously Preston Polytechnic from 1973 and then Lancashire Polytechnic from 1984 until it gained University status in 1992. Its origins trace back to the Institution for the Diffusion of Knowledge in 1828, followed by Harris Institute in 1882, and then Harris College in 1956.
Coventry University	1992	Arte et Industria (By art and industry)	Founded as Lanchester Polytechnic 1970 but traces its origins back to the Coventry School or Art & Design established in 1843
De Montfort University	1992	Excellentia et studium (Excellence and zeal)	Founded as Leicester Polytechnic 1969, but traces its origins back to the Leicester School of Art, founded in 1870
University of Derby	1992	Experientia docet (Experience is the best teacher)	formerly Derbyshire College of Higher Education
University of East London	1992	Scientia et votorum impletio (Knowledge and the fulfillment of promises)	Founded as North East London Polytechnic 1970
University of Glamorgan	1992 to April 2013	Success through endeavour	merged with University of Wales, Newport to form the University of South Wales
University of Greenwich	1992 to 2026	To learn, to do, to achieve	Merged with the University of Kent to form the London and South East University Group in 2026
University of Hertfordshire	1992	Seek knowledge throughout life	Founded as Hatfield Technical College in 1952, later becoming Hatfield College of Technology (1960) and Hatfield Polytechnic (1969)
University of Huddersfield	1992	Sic Vos Non Vobis (Thus not for you alone)	Traces its roots back to The Young Men’s Mental Improvement Society established in 1841. It became Huddersfield Technical College in 1896 and Huddersfield Polytechnic in 1970.
Kingston University	1992	Per Scientiam Progredimur	Kingston Technical Institute founded in 1899, becoming Kingston Polytechnic in 1970.
Leeds Beckett University	1992	Opening minds, opening doors	Changed its name from Leeds Metropolitan University in September 2014; formerly Leeds Polytechnic, founded in 1970, and traces its history back to the Leeds Mechanics Institute, founded in 1824.
University of Lincoln	1992	Excellence through study	Formerly Humberside Polytechnic (located in Kingston upon Hull); moved to Lincoln in 2001
London Guildhall University	1992 to 1 August 2002		merged with University of North London to form London Metropolitan University
Liverpool John Moores University	1992	Audentes fortuna juvat (Fortune favours the bold)	Formerly Liverpool Polytechnic from 1970. Founded as Liverpool Mechanics' School of Arts in 1825.
London South Bank University	1992	With Thy Might	Founded as the Borough Polytechnic Institute in 1892
Manchester Metropolitan University	1992	Many Arts, Many Skills	Founded as Manchester Polytechnic in 1970
Middlesex University	1992		Middlesex Polytechnic formed in 1973.
Napier University	June 1992	Nisi sapientia frustra (Without knowledge, everything is in vain)	Founded as Napier Technical College 1964
University of North London	1992 to 1 August 2002		merged with London Guildhall University to form London Metropolitan University
Northumbria University	1992	Aetas Discendi (The age of learning)	Formed as Newcastle Polytechnic in 1969.
Nottingham Trent University	1992	Shaping futures	Founded as the Nottingham Government School of Design in 1843. The institution became Trent Polytechnic in 1970.
Oxford Brookes University	1992		Founded as the Oxford School of Art in 1865; became Oxford Polytechnic in 1970.
University of the West of Scotland	1992	Doctrina Prosperitas (Learning is success)	Known as the University of Paisley until it merged with Bell College Hamilton in 2007, forming the University of the West of Scotland as it is known today.
Plymouth University	1992	Indagate fingite invenite (Explore, dream, discover)	Founded as a school of navigation in 1862, it became a polytechnic in 1970.
University of Portsmouth	7 July 1992	Lucem Sequamur (Let us follow the light)	Became Portsmouth Polytechnic in 1969.
The Robert Gordon University	1992	Omni Nunc Arte Magistra (Now by all your mastered arts)	Developed out of Robert Gordon's Hospital (founded 1750). Formed into Robert Gordon's Technical College in 1910 and is renamed Robert Gordon's Institute of Technology in 1965.
Sheffield Hallam University	1992	Learn and serve	Sheffield School of Design (later, Sheffield School of Art) founded in 1843. Became Sheffield City Training College in 1905 and Sheffield Polytechnic in 1969.
Staffordshire University	1992	Create the difference	Founded in 1906 by Alfred Bolton and opened in 1914 as the Central School of Science and Technology. Formed into North Staffordshire Polytechnic in 1971.
University of Sunderland	4 June 1992	Scientiam Dulce Hauriens (Sweetly absorbing knowledge)	Founded 1901 as Sunderland Technical College. Affiliated to the Newcastle Division of Durham University from 1930. Sunderland Polytechnic from 1969
Teesside University	1992	Facta non verba (Deeds Not words)	Founded as Constantine Technical College in 1930; became Teesside Polytechnic in 1969.
University of Westminster	1992	Dominus fortitudo nostra (The Lord is our strength)	The first polytechnic university – founded in 1838 as the Royal Polytechnic Institution at Regent Street, London
University of the West of England	1992	Light liberty learning	Traces its origins back to the Merchant Venturers Navigation School founded in 1595 by the Society of Merchant Venturers.
University of Wolverhampton	1992	Innovation and opportunity	It was established as the School of Art, established in 1851, which came together as the Wolverhampton and Staffordshire Technical College in 1931.
Glasgow Caledonian University	1 April 1993	For the common weal	
Cranfield University	1993	Post nubes lux (After clouds light)	Founded in 1946 as the College of Aeronautics. The Cranfield Institute of Technology was incorporated by royal charter in 1969, giving the institution its own degree-awarding powers. The current Cranfield University dates from 1993 and was established by royal charter rather than under the 1992 act
University of West London	1993		Founded as the Lady Byron School in 1860, it became the Polytechnic of West London in 1991 and Thames Valley University in 1993. It was granted permission by the Privy Council to change its name to University of West London in 2010 and the new name and logo were officially launched in April 2011.
Abertay University	1994	Beatus homo qui invenit sapientiam (Blessed is the one who finds wisdom.)	Traces its heritage from the Dundee Technical Institute established in 1888.
UMIST	1994 to 1 October 2004	Scientia et labore (By knowledge and work)	Traces its heritage from 1824. However, able to confer degrees as the Victoria University of Manchester from 1905. Royal Charter as a university college in 1956. Independent university by Royal Charter in 1994. Merged with Victoria University of Manchester to form the University of Manchester in 2004.

== 2000s/2010s universities ==
After the conversion of the polytechnics and central institutions under the Further and Higher Education Act 1992 there was a pause before a second wave of institutions gained university status in the 21st century. These were university colleges and other higher education institutions that had gained degree awarding powers since 1992 rather than being granted them on the break up of the CNAA.

From 1999, higher education policy became a devolved power, although the actual award of university and degree awarding powers remained (and remains) with the UK Privy Council. In 2004, the requirement that institutes gain research degree awarding powers before they could gain university status was dropped in England and Wales (but not in Scotland or Northern Ireland), although they were still required to have 4000 full-time equivalent students, with 3000 on degree courses. Eight university colleges without research degree awarding powers became universities in 2005. In 2012, the student numbers criterion for institutions in England was relaxed to 1000 full-time equivalent students (with 750 on degree courses) and a number of university colleges became universities. New guidance for England issued in September 2015 replaced the requirement for 750 students to be studying degree courses with a requirement that 55% of students are studying on degree courses. This was also the era of the break-up of the federal University of Wales and the accreditation of its constituent colleges as individual universities, and the secession of Imperial College from the University of London, creating new universities out of old institutions. In total, 51 further new universities were created across the UK (including those created by mergers of existing universities) between 2000 and 2018, until university accreditation in England was transferred to the new Office for Students (OfS), under the provision of the Higher Education and Research Act 2017. Two further new universities were recognised under legacy arrangements in 2018 and 2019 and are listed here, prior to a pause until 2022 as new arrangements under the OfS were put in place. Outside of England, the completion of the restructuring of Welsh universities and the Covid-19 Pandemic put a pause to institutional redevelopments around the same time.

Name	University status	Motto	Notes
University of Gloucestershire	2001	In animo et veritate {In spirit and truth}	
London Metropolitan University	1 August 2002	Knowledge in abundance	Formed by the merger of two 1992 Universities, London Guildhall University (tracing its origins back to evening classes given in 1848) and the University of North London (founded as the Northern Polytechnic Institute in 1896).
University of Bolton	April 2004	Sapientia Superat Moras (Wisdom overcomes difficulty)	Renamed University of Greater Manchester in 2024.
University of the Arts London	2004	Primus inter artifices (First amongst artists)	The collegiate body was first introduced as the London Institute in 1986, and acquired university status in 2004 as the University of the Arts London. The six colleges of art, design, fashion and media have origins dating back to the mid 19th Century.
Roehampton University	1 August 2004		Collegiate university consisting of four colleges. Earliest constituent college (Whitelands College) founded in 1841. Part of the Federal University of Surrey from 1 January 2000 to 1 August 2004.
University of Manchester	22 October 2004	Cognitio, sapientia, humanitas (Knowledge, wisdom, humanity)	Formed in 2004 by the dissolution of the Victoria University of Manchester (which was commonly known as the University of Manchester) and UMIST (University of Manchester Institute of Science and Technology) and the immediate formation of a single institution (inaugurated on 1 October). As a university by royal charter, the new institution is legally distinct from the post-1992 institutions that became universities under the auspices of the Further and Higher Education Act 1992.
Cardiff University	11 March 2005	Gwirionedd undod a chytgord (Truth, unity and concord)	Established 1883 as the University College of South Wales and Monmouthshire and was a founder member of the University of Wales in 1893. Merged with the University of Wales Institute of Science and Technology in 1988 and with the University of Wales College of Medicine in 2004. University status via supplemental charter. Left the University of Wales in 2005 on becoming an independent university. Like Manchester, Cardiff is a university by royal charter.
Canterbury Christ Church University	2005	Veritas liberabit vos (The truth shall set you free)	Canterbury Christ Church College (CCCC) was founded in 1962 as a Church of England teacher training college.
University of Chester	2005	Qui docet in doctrina (He that teacheth, on teaching)	Founded as Chester Diocesan Training College in 1839; degrees awarded by University of Liverpool 1910; university college 2003
University of Winchester	June 2005	Wisdom ond lar (from old English) Modern English translation: Wisdom and knowledge	Founded in 1840 as Winchester Diocesan Training School. In 1847 it became Winchester Training College and was renamed King Alfred's College in 1928; degree awarding powers in 2003 and became University College Winchester in 2004. In 2008 Winchester University was awarded research degree awarding powers.
Liverpool Hope University	July 2005	Faith, hope and love	Originally three teacher training institutions, Christ's College, Notre Dame and St Catherine's which merged in the late 1970s to become Liverpool Institute of Higher Education and then later, Liverpool Hope University College
Southampton Solent University	July 2005	Ready for the future	The university's origins can be traced back to a private School of Art founded in 1856, which eventually became the Southampton College of Art. Mergers with the Southampton College of Technology, and later the College of Nautical Studies at Warsash, led to the establishment of the Southampton Institute of Higher Education in 1984. Southampton Institute then became a university on 12 July 2005 as Southampton Solent University, renamed simply to Solent University in 2017, but returning to the name Southampton Solent University in 2024.
Bath Spa University	August 2005		Founded as Bath College of Higher Education 1975; university college 1992
University of Worcester	5 September 2005	Ad Inspirandum Aspiramus (Aspire to inspire)	Founded as a teacher training college in 1946, later absorbing the Herefordshire and Worcester College of Midwife training. Gained full university status in 2005 and became the University of Worcester
University of Northampton	2005	Ne Nesciamus (Let us not be ignorant)	
University of Chichester	12 October 2005	Docendo discimus (By teaching, we learn)	Founded as West Sussex Institute of Higher Education 1977; university college 1999; traces history to diocesan teacher training college established 1839
University of Bedfordshire	August 2006		With roots dating back to 1882 as Teacher Training College, in 1992 gained university status as University of Luton. In 2006 named as University of Bedfordshire by merging the University of Luton and the Bedford campus of De Montfort University.
Edge Hill University	18 May 2006	In scientia opportunitas (In knowledge there is opportunity)	Edge Hill College opened on 24 January 1885 as a non-denominational teacher training college for women
York St John University	10 July 2006	Ut Vitam Habeant et Abundantius (They may have life and have it more abundantly)	Founded in 1841 as York Diocesan College.
Queen Margaret University	January 2007		Founded in 1875 as The Edinburgh School of Cookery and Domestic Economy.
Imperial College London	July 2007	Scientia imperii decus et tutamen (Scientific knowledge, the crowning glory and the safeguard of the empire)	Founded 1907 and formerly part of the University of London. Continues to use the name "Imperial College" despite having university status. University by Royal Charter
University of Cumbria	1 August 2007		Merger of St Martin's College, Cumbria Institute of the Arts and part of University of Central Lancashire
Buckinghamshire New University	October 2007	Arte et industria (Art and industry)	formerly Buckinghamshire College of Higher Education until 1995, then Buckinghamshire Chilterns University College.
Aberystwyth University	1 September 2007	Nid byd, byd heb wybodaeth (A world without knowledge is no world at all)	Founded as University College Wales 1872; founder member of University of Wales 1893. University by royal charter
Bangor University	1 September 2007	Gorau dawn deall (The best gift is knowledge)	Founded as University College of North Wales 1884; founder member of University of Wales 1893. University by royal charter
Swansea University	1 September 2007	Gweddw crefft heb ei dawn (Technical skill is bereft without culture)	Broke away from the University of Wales, which it joined as a constituent college in 1920, to begin awarding own degrees. University by royal charter.
Swansea Metropolitan University	January 2008 to 2013		Founded as West Glamorgan Institute of Higher Education 1976. Merged with the University of Wales Trinity Saint David in 2013.
Wrexham Glyndŵr University	3 July 2008	Hyder trwy Addysg {Confidence through education}	Founded as Wrexham School of Science and Art 1887
University for the Creative Arts	May 2008		Founded 2005 as the University College for the Creative Arts at Canterbury, Epsom, Farnham, Maidstone and Rochester
University of Wales Trinity Saint David	2010		Merger between University of Wales, Lampeter (founded 1822) and Trinity University College, incorporated under Lampeter's 1828 charter. University by Royal Charter.
Cardiff Metropolitan University	2011	Gorau Meddiant Gwybodaeth (The most valuable possession is knowledge)	Part of federal University of Wales as the University of Wales Institute, Cardiff (UWIC) until 2011
University of the Highlands and Islands	2011		The "UHI Millennium institute", a collegiate partnership of 13 colleges and research institutions scattered throughout the highlands and islands, Moray, and Perthshire and providing in excess of 50 additional learning centres in the same areas gained full university status as The University of the Highlands and Islands (Oilthigh na Gàidhealtachd agus nan Eilean) in 2011; it had been a Higher Education Institute since 2001, and acquired the power to grant its own degrees from 2008, prior to which its degrees were authenticated by Open University Validation Service, the University of Strathclyde, and the University of Aberdeen
University of Law	22 November 2012	Leges Juraque Cognoscamus {Let us know the laws and rights}	Founded 1962 as The College of Law, royal charter 1975. Education business sold off as a for-profit private limited company (becoming the University of Law) in 2012, with the chartered charity continuing as the Legal Education Foundation. Part of Global University Systems.
University College Birmingham	2012	Service Before Self	Did not change name on acquiring university status
Bishop Grosseteste University	2012	Ne omnia sibi habeat (Not all things to oneself)	Traces its origins back to the Diocese of Lincoln's Diocesan Training School for Mistresses, founded in 1862. Degree awarding powers from 2006.
Arts University Bournemouth	2012		Formerly Arts Institute Bournemouth (AIB) and Arts University College at Bournemouth (AUCB). Founded 1883
Falmouth University	2012	Creative, connected, courageous	Founded in 1902 as Falmouth School of Art
Harper Adams University	2012	Utile Dulci (Useful and agreeable)	Founded in 1901
University of St Mark & St John	2013	Abeunt studia in mores (Out of studies comes character)	Formed as two separate teacher training colleges which subsequently merged and relocated; St John's College, Battersea (1840) and St Mark's College, Chelsea (1841).
Leeds Trinity University	2012		Formed as Trinity & All Saints College in 1980 by merger of Trinity College and All Saints College
Royal Agricultural University	2012	Avorum Cultus Pecorumque (Caring for the Fields and the Beasts)	Founded 1845 as the Royal Agricultural College
Norwich University of the Arts	2012		Formerly Norwich University College of the Arts, founded in 2007, which traces its origins back to the Norwich School of Design, founded in 1845
Newman University, Birmingham	2012	Ex Umbris in Veritatem (From the shadows to the truth)	Former Newman University College granted university status
Regent's University London	March 2013		Private university. Formerly Regent's College (founded 1984)
University of South Wales	April 2013		Formed from merger of the University of Glamorgan and the University of Wales, Newport
BPP University	August 2013	Your ambition realised	Founded as BPP Law School 1992. Private for-profit university. Part of Apollo Group.
St Mary's University, Twickenham	23 January 2014	Monstra te esse matrem (Show thyself to be a mother)	St Mary's was founded in 1850 as a Roman Catholic teacher training college for male students.
Arden University	5 August 2015		Private for-profit blended learning university, title awarded via Companies House rather than the Privy Council. Formerly called RDI. Sold by Capella Education Company to Global University Systems in August 2016.
University of Suffolk	1 August 2016		Previously University Campus Suffolk, established 2007 as a joint venture between the University of Essex and the University of East Anglia.
Leeds Arts University	August 2017		Previously Leeds College of Art and Design. Taught degree awarding powers 2016.
Ravensbourne University London	23 May 2018		Taught degree awarding powers August 2017.
Hartpury University	17 September 2018	Proud to belong	Taught degree awarding powers July 2017.
Richmond, The American International University in London	2019		Taught degree awarding powers 2018. University title under the provisions of the Companies Act in 2019.

== 2020s universities ==
The first approvals under the OfS were member institutions of the University of London that had gained the power to apply for university status in their own right under the University of London Act 2018. While a few other new universities were approved in 2022, these marked the end of the expansionary period of the 2000s and 2010s, with financial pressures on the university sector increasingly threatening contraction rather than expansion. In 2026, the new London and South East University Group was approved as a merger of the University of Greenwich and University of Kent, with further mergers of institutions predicted as likely as a response to financial insecurity.

Name	University status	Motto	Notes
St George's, University of London	10 March 2022		St George's Hospital founded 1733 and began formal medical training 1751. Member institution of the University of London. Applied for university status in its own right following the passing of the University of London Act 2018. Granted university title 10 March 2022 and updated Scheme (under the National Health Service Act 1946) reflecting the updated status as a university approved by the St George's Council 30 June 2022. Merged with City, University of London on 1 August 2024.
Arts University Plymouth	May 2022		Founded 1856. Previously Plymouth College of Art. Taught degree awarding powers 2019.
London School of Economics	5 July 2022	Rerum cognoscere causas (To understand the causes of things)	Founded 1895. Member institution of the University of London from 1900. Applied for university status in its own right following the passing of the University of London Act 2018. Approval of university title received from the Office for Students in May 2022 and updated Articles of Association formally constituting the school as a university approved by LSE council 5 July 2022.
Northeastern University – London	20 July 2022		Opened 2012. Previously NCH at Northeastern and New College of the Humanities. Awarded university title and name change approved by the Office for Students 20 July 2022.
BIMM University	21 July 2022		Founded as Drumtech in 1983. Granted taught degree awarding powers in 2019 Awarded university title in 2022.
Royal Holloway, University of London	30 November 2022		Applied for university status in its own right following the passing of the University of London Act 2018. Order of Council approving an update to statutes under the Royal Holloway and Bedford New College Act 1985, specifying that it is "a higher education institution which holds university title", made 30 November 2022.
City, University of London	March 2023		Applied for university status in its own right following the passing of the University of London Act 2018. Supplemental charter granting university status sealed March 2023. Merged with St George's, University of London on 1 August 2024.
Royal Veterinary College	17 April 2023		Applied for university status in its own right following the passing of the University of London Act 2018. Supplemental charter granting university status sealed 17 April 2023.
University College London	17 April 2023		Applied for university status in its own right following the passing of the University of London Act 2018. Supplemental charter granting university status sealed 17 April 2023.
King's College London	18 May 2023		Applied for university status in its own right following the passing of the University of London Act 2018. Supplemental charter granting university status sealed 18 May 2023.
Queen Mary University of London	25 May 2023		Applied for university status in its own right following the passing of the University of London Act 2018. Supplemental charter granting university status sealed 25 May 2023.
Birkbeck, University of London	25 May 2023		Applied for university status in its own right following the passing of the University of London Act 2018. Supplemental charter granting university status sealed in 2023.
SOAS, University of London	2023?		Applied for university status in its own right following the passing of the University of London Act 2018. Supplemental charter granting university status approved 17 May 2023 (date of sealing not given).
Health Sciences University	26 July 2024		Opened 1965. Previously AECC University College. Awarded university title and name change approved by the Office for Students 26 July 2024.
City St George's, University of London	1 August 2024		Formed by merger of City, University of London and St George's, University of London.
Goldsmiths, University of London	August 2024		Applied for university status in its own right following the passing of the University of London Act 2018. Supplemental charter granting university status sealed in August 2024.
London School of Hygiene and Tropical Medicine	2025?		Applied for university status in its own right following the passing of the University of London Act 2018. Supplemental charter granting university status approved 5 February 2025 (date of sealing not given).
London and South East University Group	1 August 2026		Formed by merger of the University of Greenwich and the University of Kent
Norland University of Early Childhood	7 September 2026		Previously Norland College

== Recognised bodies without university status ==
Some recognised bodies (bodies with degree awarding powers) have not been formally granted university status. Educational institutions with their own degree awarding powers but which are not formally recognised as universities are listed here by date of receiving their degree awarding powers. This table does not include colleges of the University of London (all of which are recognised bodies with the authority to grant University of London degrees, and many of which also have their own degree awarding powers), which are listed below. It also does not include institutions that have the power to award foundation degrees only.

Institute	Degree awarding powers	Notes
Presbyterian Theological Faculty Ireland	1881	By royal charter; limited to postgraduate degrees in theology
Royal College of Music	1882	By royal charter, originally degrees in music only
Royal College of Art	1967	By royal charter; describes itself as being 'an institution of university status' but not recognised as a university by the Office for Students
Royal Conservatoire of Scotland	1993/94	
Royal Northern College of Music	2007	
Hult Ashridge	2008	
Walbrook Institute London	2010	Granted university college status (as ifs University College) in 2013; lost in 2023 due to transfer of ownership and conversion to a limited company
University College of Estate Management	January 2013	Incorporated by royal charter in 1922. Granted university college status in November 2015. Approved for university title in 2025 and now trading as University of the Built Environment; awaiting changes to royal charter to effect this.
Guildhall School of Music and Drama	April 2014	
NCG	June 2016	
Rose Bruford College of Theatre & Performance	February 2017	
Liverpool School of Tropical Medicine	August 2017	
Architectural Association School of Architecture	October 2019	
TEC Partnership	August 2021	Added power to award bachelor's degrees to existing power to award foundation degrees
London Academy of Music and Dramatic Art	August 2021	Taught degrees
Dyson Institute of Engineering and Technology	September 2021	Taught degrees
TEDI-London	September 2021	Specified taught degrees; power to award taught degrees in specific subjects added from August 2025. Since 2025, trading as ASU London and linked to Arizona State University
London Interdisciplinary School	September 2021	Specified taught degrees; expanded to taught degrees generally from January 2025.
College of Legal Practice	February 2022	Specified taught degrees
Institute of Contemporary Music Performance	September 2022	Taught degrees
Blackpool and The Fylde College	September 2022	Added power to award bachelor's degrees to existing power to award foundation degrees
Multiverse	September 2022	Specified taught degrees; taught degrees in specific subjects added from December 2025.
National Film and Television School	January 2023	Taught degrees in specific subjects
S P Jain London School of Management	September 2023	Taught degrees in specific subjects
New Model Institute for Technology and Engineering	September 2023	Taught degrees in specific subjects
Hult International Business School	October 2023	Taught degrees in specific subjects Held separately from the degree-awarding powers of Hult Ashridge
ESCP Europe Business School	September 2024	Taught degrees in specific subjects
Luminate Education Group	September 2024	Bachelor's degrees
The Northern School of Art	October 2024	Taught degrees
SRUC	October 2024	Taught degrees
Warwickshire College	January 2025	Bachelor's degrees
Engineering College of Technology	April 2025	Taught degrees in specific subjects
School-Led Development Trust	August 2025	Taught degrees in specific subjects
Northern School of Contemporary Dance	September 2025	Taught degrees
Liverpool Institute for Performing Arts	September 2025	Taught degrees in specific subjects
LTE Group	January 2026	Bachelor's degrees in specific subjects
Point Blank Music School	April 2026	Bachelor's degrees in specific subjects
Cornwall College	May 2026	Added power to award bachelor's degrees to existing power to award foundation degrees

== Federal universities ==
Some institutions were members of federal universities as university-level institutions before becoming universities in their own right.

=== University of London ===
The University of London was formed as a degree-awarding examining board in 1836 in response to the application of University College London (UCL) to be chartered as a university. It originally operated a system of affiliated institutions with two registers: one (controlled by the government) of institutions allowed to submit students for examination for Arts and Law degrees, with UCL and King's College London (KCL) as the two initial colleges named in the charter, and a second (controlled by the university) of institutions allowed to submit students for medical degrees. Apart from being allowed to submit students for London examinations, there was no connection between the affiliated colleges and the university.

In 1858, the affiliation system was abandoned for Arts and Law degrees, with these being opened to anyone willing to travel to London for the examinations. In 1900, following a period of pressure from UCL and KCL, the university was reorganised as a federal body after the model of the Victoria University and the University of Wales. Degrees were reorganised as external (the earlier open examinations, now University of London (Worldwide)) and internal (for students at London institutions that became schools of the university).

In 2005–2006 University College London, King’s College London, the London School of Economics and Imperial College London gained the right to award degrees in their own name, although this right was not exercised until 2007. In 2007 Imperial College left the federation and became an independent university. Other institutions have since gone on to gain their own degree awarding powers, and a number of institutions have recently joined the federal structure. The University of London Act 2018 allowed member institutions to become universities in their own right while remaining part of the federal university; in February 2019 twelve colleges said they were applying to become universities.

Institution	College founded	Joined federation	Full college	Notes
University College London	1826	1836	1900	Merged into University of London 1907–1977. Incorporated by royal charter 1836–1869, by act of parliament 1869–1907, and by royal charter from 1978. Awarded independent degrees from 2007
King's College London	1829	1836	1900	Merged into University of London 1910 – 1980. Royal charter was initially received in 1829 but was reincorporated by a new royal charter in 1980, currently incorporated under a royal charter granted in May 2009. Awarded independent degrees from 2007. The St Thomas's Hospital Medical School was founded around 1550.
St George's, University of London	1733	1840	1900	Awarded independent degrees from 2007. Statutory body under the National Health Service Act 1946 rather than established by royal charter.
Royal Holloway, University of London	1886	1900	1900	Merged with Bedford College (founded 1849) in 1985. Merged college incorporated by act of parliament (as Royal Holloway and Bedford New College) 1985 rather than by royal charter; Royal Holloway College incorporated by act of parliament 1949–1985; Bedford College incorporated by royal charter 1909, revoked 1985. Has its own degree awarding powers.
London School of Economics	1895	1900	1900	Awarded own degrees from 2007. Company Limited by Guarantee rather than established by royal charter.
Goldsmiths, University of London	1891	1904	1988	Royal charter 1990. Has its own degree awarding powers.
Queen Mary, University of London	1887	1907–1915	1915	Merged with Westfield College (founded 1882) in 1989. Merged with St Bartholomew's Hospital Medical College (founded 1843) and London Hospital Medical College (founded 1785) in 1995. Awards own degrees since 2013. Royal charter 1934.
SOAS, University of London	1916	1916	1916	Royal charter 1916. Has its own degree awarding powers.
Birkbeck, University of London	1823	1920	1920	Founded 1823 as London Mechanics' Institute; admitted women from 1830; named changed in 1866 to Birkbeck Literary and Scientific Institution; finally to Birkbeck College in 1907. Royal charter 1926. Holds, but does not use, degree awarding powers.
London School of Hygiene & Tropical Medicine	1899	1924		Royal Charter 1924. Has its own degree awarding powers.
Courtauld Institute of Art	1932	1932	2002	Company Limited by Guarantee rather than established by royal charter.
Royal Veterinary College	1791		1949	Royal charter 1875. Has its own degree awarding powers.
London Business School	1964	1965		Originally registered as a company; incorporated by royal charter 1986. Has its own degree awarding powers.
Institute of Cancer Research	1909	1996	2003	Incorporated 1954 as a Company Limited by Guarantee.
Royal Academy of Music	1822		1999	Royal charter 1830. Has its own degree awarding powers.
Royal Central School of Speech and Drama	1906	2005	2005	Incorporated 1989. Has held degree awarding powers since 2005. Became the Royal Central School of Speech and Drama in 2012. Company Limited by Guarantee.
City, University of London	1894	2016	2016	Founded 1894 as the Northampton Institute. University status from 1966 by royal charter. Merged with the Inns of Court Law School (founded 1852) in 2001. Surrendered university status and joined the University of London 1 September 2016.

=== Former members of federal universities ===
Former federal universities in Great Britain include the Victoria University, the University of Wales, the University of St Andrews, the University of Durham, and the Federal University of Surrey. In the first two cases, the federal university merged with one of its colleges when it broke up (a process still ongoing as of July 2018 for Wales) while in the other three cases, where the university had previously existed as a non-federal body, it simply reverted to that status. In Ireland the Queen's University of Ireland was succeeded by the Royal University of Ireland which was succeeded (without Belfast) by the National University of Ireland, which continued to exist after Irish independence.

The longest lived of these federal institutions was the University of Wales, which was founded by royal charter in 1893 with the federation of University College Wales (now Aberystwyth University), University College North Wales (now Bangor University) and University College South Wales and Monmouthshire (now Cardiff University). Prior to this, students at these university colleges prepared for examinations of the University of London. The university grew with the addition of further colleges, and in 1971 St David's College, Lampeter (now part of the University of Wales Trinity Saint David), Wales' oldest degree-awarding institution, suspended its own degree-awarding powers and entered the University of Wales as St David's University College.

In 2007 the university changed from a federal structure to a confederation of independent institutions, allowing individual institutions which had gained the status of universities in their own right to use the title of university, and in 2008 Aberystwyth, Bangor and Swansea Universities decided to exercise their right to award their own degrees. This led to the effective break-up of the university in 2011, with it being decided that the University of Wales would merge with the University of Wales Trinity Saint David and no longer accredit other institutions. From August 2017 the two institutions have been functionally integrated although a legal merger has not (as of July 2018) been finalised.

This table of universities that were former members of federal universities is sorted primarily by when they became part of a federal university, with date of institutional foundation as a secondary index.

Institution	College founded	Original name	Federal university	Joined federation	Left federation	Notes
Queen's University Belfast	1845	Queens College Belfast	Queen's, Royal	1850	1908	
Victoria University of Manchester	1851	Owens College	Victoria	1880	1994	Owens College merged with the Victoria University in 1904 to form the Victoria University of Manchester. Merged with UMIST in 2004 to form the University of Manchester.
University of Liverpool	1882	University College, Liverpool	Victoria	1884	1903	
University of Leeds	1884	Yorkshire College	Victoria	1887	1904	Yorkshire College formed 1884 from the merger of Yorkshire College of Science (est. 1874) and Leeds School of Medicine (est. 1831).
Aberystwyth University	1872	University College Wales	Wales	1893	2007	
Cardiff University	1883	University College of South Wales and Monmouthshire	Wales	1893	2005	
Bangor University	1884	University College of North Wales	Wales	1893	2007	
University of Dundee	1881	University College, Dundee	St Andrews	1887	1967	
Imperial College London	1907	–	London	1907	2007	Traces history back to the Royal College of Chemistry (est. 1845), the Royal School of Mines (est. 1851) and the Royal College of Science (est. 1881).
Newcastle University	1908	Newcastle division	Durham	1908	1963	Comprised Armstrong College (est. 1871 as the Durham College of Physical Science) and the University of Durham College of Medicine (est. 1831 as the Newcastle School of Medicine and Surgery). These two institutions merged in 1934 to form King's College, Durham.
Swansea University	1920	University College of Swansea	Wales	1920	2007	
University of Wales Trinity Saint David	1822	Saint David's College, Lampeter	Wales	1971	2011	University of Wales, Lampeter merged with Trinity University College in 2010 to form University of Wales Trinity Saint David
Cardiff Metropolitan University	1865	Cardiff School of Art	Wales	1992	2011	University of Wales Institute Cardiff from 1992.
University of Wales, Newport	1840s	Newport Mechanics' Institute	Wales	1996	2011	University of Wales College, Newport from 1996. Merged with University of Glamorgan in 2013 to form the University of South Wales
Roehampton University	1975	Roehampton Institute of Higher Education	Surrey	2000	2004	Traces history to foundation of Whitelands College in 1841
Wrexham Glyndŵr University	1887	Wrexham School of Science & Arts	Wales	2004	2008	Higher Education Corporation from 1993 under the name of North East Wales Institute

== Former universities ==
This table contains universities that were officially recognised but were dissolved either by merging, splitting or just closing down. It does not include institutions which did not receive official recognition as universities, such as the attempt to found a university at Stamford in the 14th century, Cromwell's New College, Durham in the 17th century, or colleges of the federal universities of Wales and London that never became independent universities. It also does not include universities in the Republic of Ireland that ceased to be UK universities on independence from the UK.

Name	University status	Motto	Ceased to be a university	Reason
University of Northampton	1261		1265	Dissolved by King Henry III
Fraserburgh University	1592		1605	Founded by permission of royal charter granted to Sir Alexander Fraser. Closed after the principal, Charles Ferme, was arrested and imprisoned for "unlawfully assembling against the letters and charges of his majesty".
Marischal College	1593		1860	Founded by George Keith, 5th Earl Marischal, later confirmed by act of parliament. Was merged into the University of Aberdeen
Queen's University of Ireland	1850		1880	Federal university with colleges in Belfast, Cork and Galway. Replaced by the Royal University of Ireland (see below)
Royal University of Ireland	1880		1908	Examining board for Irish colleges. Replaced by the National University of Ireland, with Queen's College Belfast becoming Queen's University Belfast
Victoria University	20 April 1880	Olim Armis Nunc Studiis	1 October 1904	Leeds and Liverpool left; surviving college became Victoria University of Manchester
University of Wales	1893		October 2011	Still legally in existence as of August 2018 but "effectively abolished" in October 2011 via merger with University of Wales Trinity St David.
Victoria University of Manchester	1 October 1904	Arduus Ad Solem	1 October 2004	Merged with UMIST to form the University of Manchester
New University of Ulster	1968		1984	merged with Ulster Polytechnic to form University of Ulster
University of Glamorgan	1992	Success Through Endeavour	April 2013	merged with University of Wales, Newport to form the University of South Wales
University of North London	1992		1 August 2002	merged with London Guildhall University to form London Metropolitan University
London Guildhall University	1992		1 August 2002	merged with University of North London to form London Metropolitan University
UMIST	1994	Scientia et Labore	1 October 2004	Traces its origins to 1824. Students gained Victoria University of Manchester degrees from 1905. Royal Charter as a university college in 1956. Independent university 1994. Merged with Victoria University of Manchester to form the University of Manchester
Swansea Metropolitan University	2008		1 August 2013	Merged into the University of Wales Trinity Saint David
City University, London	1966	To serve mankind	2016	Became a college of the University of London in 2016 as City, University of London
St George's, University of London, London	2022		2024	Merged with City, University of London to become City St George's, University of London
City, University of London, London	2023	To serve mankind	2024	Merged with St George's, University of London to become City St George's, University of London
University of Kent, Canterbury	1965		2026	Merged with the University of Greenwich to become London and South East University Group
University of Greenwich, London	1992		2026	Merged with the University of Kent to become London and South East University Group

== Timeline of university numbers ==
Year	Cumulative no. of univs	Founded that year	Closed/merged that year
c. 1200	1	Oxford	
1209	2	Cambridge	
1413	3	St Andrews	
1451	4	Glasgow	
1495	5	Aberdeen (King's College)	
1583	6	Edinburgh	
1592	7	Fraserburgh, Aberdeenshire	
1593	8	Marischal College, Aberdeen	
1605	7		Fraserburgh
1832	8	Durham	
1836	9	London	
1850	10	Queen's Ireland	
1860	9		Marischal Aberdeen
1880	10	Victoria, Royal Ireland	Queen's Ireland
1893	11	Wales	
1900	12	Birmingham	
1903	13	Liverpool	
1904	14	Leeds, Victoria Manchester	Victoria
1905	15	Sheffield	
1908	15	Queen's Belfast	Royal Ireland
1909	16	Bristol	
1926	17	Reading	
1948	18	Nottingham	
1952	19	Southampton	
1954	20	Hull	
1955	21	Exeter	
1957	22	Leicester	
1961	23	Sussex	
1962	24	Keele	
1963	27	East Anglia, York, Newcastle	
1964	29	Lancaster, Strathclyde	
1965	32	Kent, Essex, Warwick	
1966	40	Loughborough, Aston, Brunel, Surrey, Bath, Bradford, City London, Heriot-Watt	
1967	43	Salford, Dundee, Stirling	
1968	44	Ulster New	
1969	45	Open	
1983	46	Buckingham	
1984	46	Ulster	Ulster New
1992	84	Glamorgan, Anglia Ruskin, Birmingham City, Bournemouth, Brighton, C Lancs, Coventry, De Montfort, Derby, E London, Greenwich, Hertfordshire, Huddersfield, Kingston, Leeds Beckett, Lincoln, Guildhall, N London, John Moores, South Bank, Manchester Met, Middlesex, Napier, Northumbria, Nottingham Trent, Oxford Brookes, W of Scotland, Plymouth, Portsmouth, Robert Gordon, Sheffield Hallam, Staffordshire, Sunderland, Teesside, W London, Westminster, W of England, Wolverhampton	
1993	87	Glasgow Caledonian, Cranfield, Luton	
1994	89	Abertay, UMIST	
2001	90	Gloucestershire	
2002	89	London Met	Guildhall, N London
2004	91	Bolton, Arts London, Roehampton, Manchester	UMIST, Victoria Manchester
2005	101	Cardiff, Canterbury, Chester, Winchester, Liverpool Hope, Solent, Bath Spa, Worcester, Northampton, Chichester	
2006	103	Bedfordshire, Edge Hill, York St John	Luton
2007	110	Imperial, Aberystwyth, Bangor, Swansea, Queen Margaret, Cumbria, Bucks New	
2008	113	Glyndwr, Swansea Met, Creative Arts	
2010	114	Trinity St David	
2011	116	Cardiff Met, Highlands & Islands	
2012	127	Law, UC Birmingham, Bishop Grosseteste, Bournemouth Arts, Falmouth, Harper Adams, Plymouth Marjon, Leeds Trinity, Royal Agricultural, Norwich Arts, Newman	
2013	128	South Wales, Regent's, BPP	Glamorgan, Swansea Met
2014	129	Twickenham	
2015	130	Arden	
2016	130	Suffolk	City London
2017	131	Leeds Arts	
2018	133	Ravensbourne, Hartpury	
2019	134	Richmond	
2022	140	Arts Plymouth, St George's, LSE, Northeastern, BIMM, Royal Holloway	
2023	147	City, RVC, UCL, KCL, QMUL, Birkbeck, SOAS	
2024	148	City St George's, Goldsmiths, HSU	St George's, City
2025	149	LSHTM	
2026	149	LASE, Norland	Greenwich, Kent

== Universities and university colleges in overseas territories ==
These institutions operate in British Overseas Territories, and are not considered UK universities and are not recognised as degree-awarding bodies by the British government.

Name	Territory	University status	Motto	Notes
University of the West Indies	Anguilla; Bermuda; British Virgin Islands; Cayman Islands; Montserrat	1962		Operates across current and former British territories in the West Indies. Physical campuses in Jamaica, Trinidad and Tobago and Barbados. Operated as part of the University of London 1948–1962 as the University College of the West Indies
International College of the Cayman Islands	Cayman Islands	1970		
University College of the Cayman Islands	Cayman Islands	1975		
St. Matthews University	Cayman Islands	1997		Founded in Belize; moved to the Cayman Islands in 2002
Saint James School of Medicine	Anguilla	1999		Founded in Bonaire; moved to Anguilla in 2010
University of Science, Arts and Technology	Montserrat	2003		

== See also ==
- Armorial of UK universities
- List of oldest universities in continuous operation
- List of universities in the United Kingdom
- List of universities in the United Kingdom by enrolment
- List of UK universities by endowment
- Third oldest university in England debate
- Universities in the United Kingdom
