= Cheyenne County Courthouse =

Cheyenne County Courthouse may refer to:

- Cheyenne County Courthouse (Colorado), Cheyenne Wells, Colorado
- Cheyenne County Courthouse (Kansas), St. Francis, Kansas
