= Fire Station No. 2 (Topeka, Kansas) =

- Fire Station No. 2-Topeka
- U.S. National Register of Historic Places
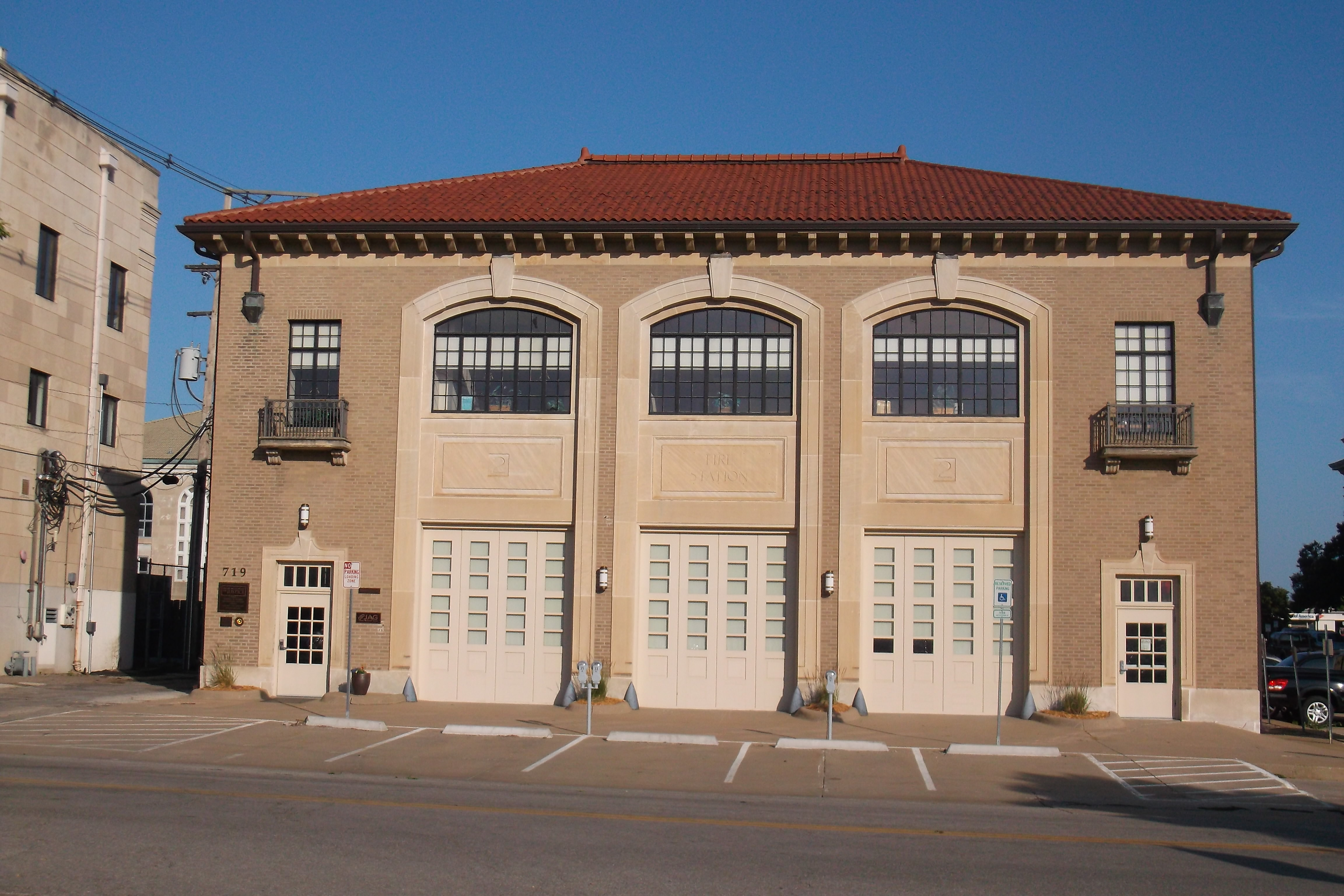

- Location within Kansas
- Location: 719-723 Van Buren, Topeka, Kansas
- Coordinates: 39°03′07″N 95°40′35″W
- Area: Less than one acre
- Built: 1927
- Architect: Thomas Wilson Williamson
- Architectural style: Mission/Spanish Revival
- NRHP reference No.: 02000715
- Added to NRHP: July 3, 2002

The Fire Station No. 2 in Topeka, Kansas, at 719-723 Van Buren, is a fire station which was built in 1927. It was listed on the National Register of Historic Places in 2002 as Fire Station No. 2-Topeka.

It was designed by architect Thomas Wilson Williamson in 1927 to serve as Topeka's Fire Department Headquarters and as a fire station for Company No. 2. It is a two-and-a-half-story building with elements of Mediterranean Revival style (within the broader Spanish Colonial Revival style), including its wrought iron balcony railings and its Spanish tile roof. Its modern features included a 60-foot (18 m) high fire drill tower, which was removed in 1967, and a fire alarm center.

It was remodeled in 1979 to serve as the Topeka Emergency Communication Center (TECOM), Topeka's then-new combined fire and police dispatch and 911 center.
