= Union County Courthouse (Iowa) =

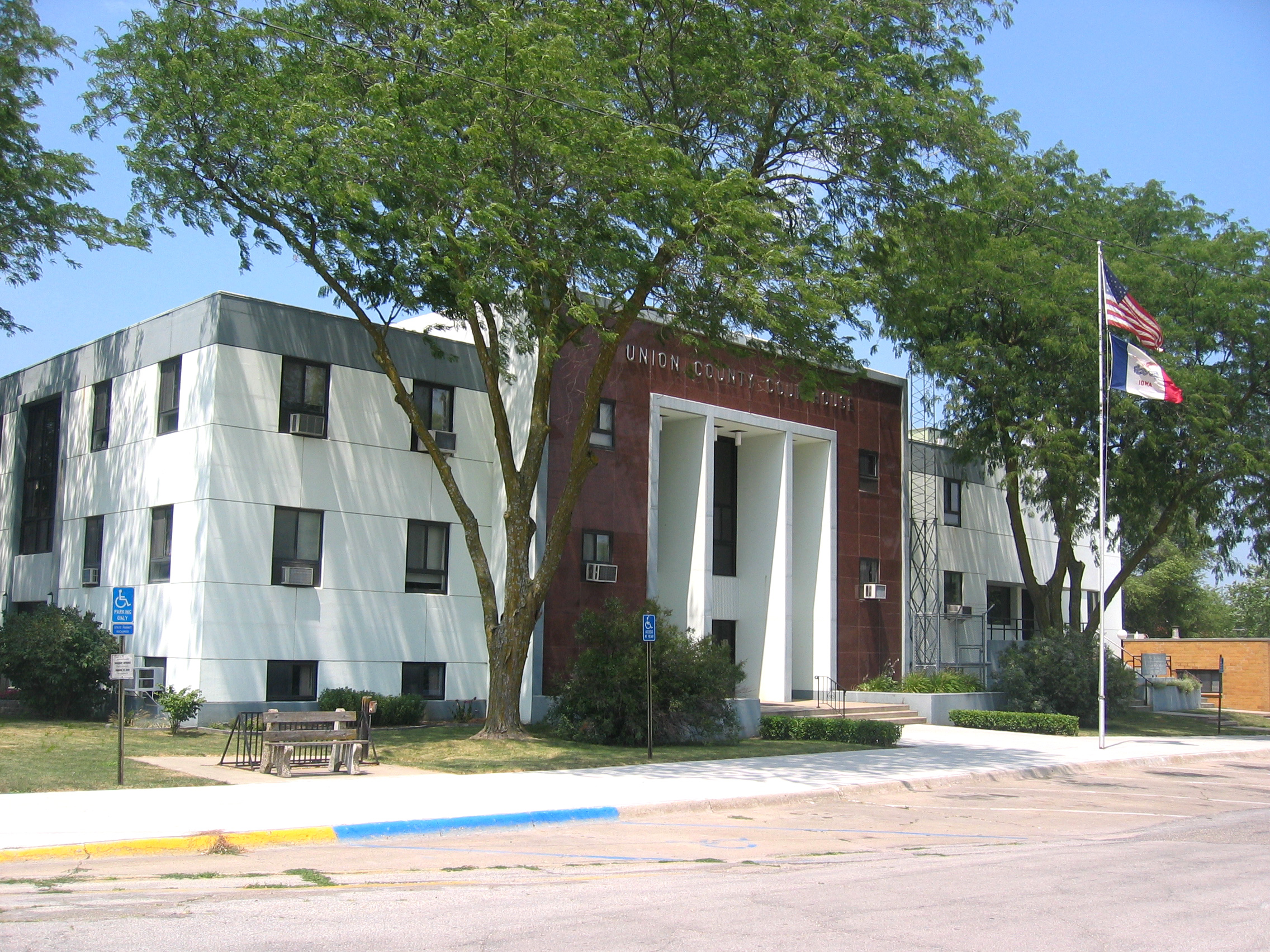
- Union County Courthouse
- Interactive map of the Union County Courthouse area

General information
- Type: Courthouse
- Architectural style: Modern
- Location: 300 N Pine St., Creston, Iowa, United States
- Coordinates: 41.060045°N 94.361875°W
- Completed: 1952

Technical details
- Floor count: Two

Design and construction
- Architecture firm: Thomas W. Williamson, Victor Loebsack and Associates
- Main contractor: O.D. Mulligan Construction Company

The Union County Courthouse is located in Creston, Iowa, United States. It is the fourth building used as a court house in Union County.

== History ==
Court functions were initially held in rented rooms in private residences in Afton. The first courthouse was a frame structure built in 1857. The building was also used as a school and a church. The Baptist congregation paid a quarter of the costs to purchase the bell. Stone for the second courthouse, completed in 1872, was quarried along the Grand River. The third courthouse, completed in 1890, was built in Creston by the citizens of that town as an inducement to have the county seat moved there.

The present courthouse replaced it in 1952. A $300,000 bond issue passed in 1946, and the Modernist structure was completed in 1952. It was designed by Thomas W. Williamson, Victor H. Loebsack & Associates, and built by O.D. Mulligan Construction Company. It is a three-story concrete and glass structure. The main facade features a central pavilion that projects from the main building and is faced with dark red colored stone. Two concrete pillars divide the recessed windows and doorway. The building has a flat roof.
