= Cair Paravel Latin School =

Location
- 635 Southwest Clay Street; Topeka, Kansas 66606; United States; 39°03′17″N 95°41′19″W

Information
- Type: Private
- Motto: Dominus Illuminatio Mea (The Lord is my light)
- Established: 1980
- Headmaster: Melody Congdon
- Faculty: 27
- Grades: K-12
- Enrollment: 425
- Campus size: 3.5 acres (14,000 m^{2})
- Campus type: Urban
- Colors: Maroon, Navy, gray
- Mascot: Rampant red lion
- Website: www.cpls.org

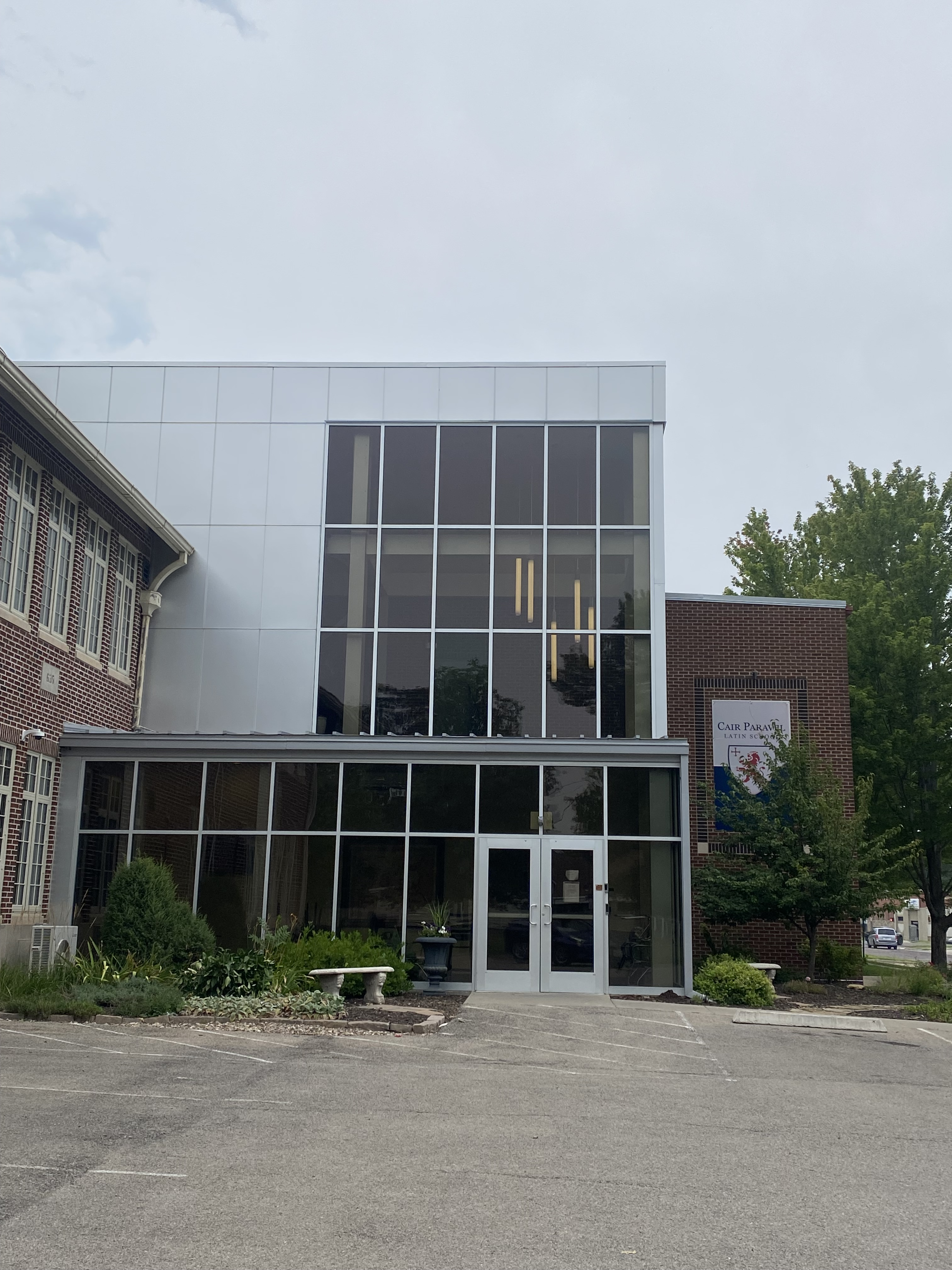
Cair Paravel Latin School in Topeka, Kansas

Cair Paravel Latin School (often referred to as CPLS or just Cair Paravel) is a private, coeducational, non-profit, non-denominational Christian school located in Topeka, Kansas, United States. The school was founded in 1980, making it one of the first classical Christian schools. With over 400 students, Cair Paravel is the largest school in Kansas offering a Classical Christian education. Cair Paravel is accredited by the Association of Classical Christian Schools.

== Academics ==
Cair Paravel is both Christ-centered and classical. The school teaches all subjects as parts of an integrated whole with Biblical scriptures at the center. The curriculum of Cair Paravel is based on the Trivium and emphasizes grammar, logic, and rhetoric. Grammar means the fundamental terms, rules and principles of each subject. Logic means the ordered relationship of particulars in each subject. Rhetoric means the clear and eloquent expression of the truths and principles of each subject.

== Fine arts ==
Cair Paravel maintains fine art curricula including orchestra, drama, art, and choir.

== Athletics ==
Cair Paravel offers the following athletic programs for the middle and upper school:

- Football
- Cheerleading
- Boys basketball
- Girls basketball
- Golf
- Boys soccer
- Girls soccer
- Boys tennis
- Girls tennis
- Boys volleyball
- Girls volleyball
- Track
- Baseball

== Campus ==
The main building is the former Clay Elementary School, built in 1926 and designed by Thomas Wilson Williamson and Ted Greist. The name is taken from the capital of Narnia in the books by C.S. Lewis.
