= Theodore R. Griest =

American architect (1898–1974

- Born: August 14, 1898; Cheyenne Wells, Colorado
- Died: April 19, 1974 (aged 75); Topeka, Kansas
- Occupation: Architect
- Awards: Fellow, American Institute of Architects (1958)
- Practice: Theodore R. Griest; Griest & Coolidge; Griest & Ekdahl

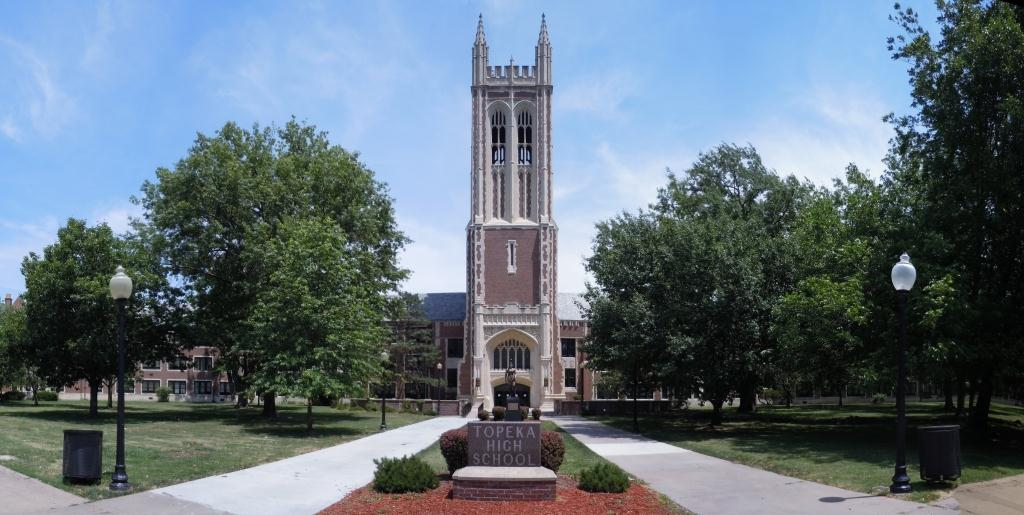
Topeka High School, designed by Griest for T. W. Williamson & Company and completed in 1931.

Theodore R. Griest FAIA (August 14, 1898 – April 19, 1974) was an American architect in practice in Topeka, Kansas from 1933 until his retirement in 1956. Griest's architectural work included Topeka's high school (1931), city hall (1940) and public library (1954). In his retirement he was involved in the City of Topeka's planning and urban renewal efforts.

== Life and career ==
Theodore Reed "Ted" Griest was born August 14, 1898, in Cheyenne Wells, Colorado to John E. Griest and Annie Griest, née Campbell. He was educated at Kansas State College, graduating in 1923 with a BS in architecture. In between terms he worked for Topeka architect Thomas W. Williamson. After his graduation he briefly worked for Lowe & Bollenbacher in Chicago before returning to Williamson. In 1929–30 he spent a year in graduate study at Harvard University. He then returned to Williamson as chief designer. For Williamson, Griest designed the Topeka High School, completed in 1931.

In 1933 Griest left Williamson to open an independent office. In 1937 he formed the partnership of Griest & Coolidge with Raymond A. Coolidge, this was dissolved in 1942. In 1946 he formed a new partnership, Griest & Ekdahl, with Oscar S. Ekdahl. Griest retired from the partnership in 1956, which was continued by Ekdahl as Ekdahl, Davis & Depew. After retiring from his firm, Griest turned to consulting work, in which he would remain until his death.

In 1957 Griest joined the Topeka planning commission, a year after the city began a major urban renewal project, which would eliminate a largely Black neighborhood known as "the Bottoms" and substantially depopulate the city center. He left the commission in 1959 and in 1962 was directly employed by the city as a consultant. He was involved in the urban renewal project until 1970. At the time the project was supported by the local elite, but was rejected by neighborhood residents. No public vote was ever taken on the project.

In 1949, when architects in Kansas were first required to be licensed, Griest was appointed to the board charged with setting licensing rules. He served on the board until 1959. He joined the American Institute of Architects in 1935 as a member of the Kansas chapter. In 1958 he was elected a Fellow in recognition of his public service.

== Personal life ==
Griest was married in 1931 to Frances H. Crarey. He died April 19, 1974.

== Architectural works ==
=== For T. W. Williamson & Company, 1930–1933 ===
- 1931 – Topeka High School, (Note: NRHP-listed.) 800 SW 10th St, Topeka, Kansas
- 1932 – First National Bank Building, (Note: Demolished.) 535 S Kansas Ave, Topeka, Kansas

=== Griest & Coolidge, 1937–1942 ===
- 1939 – Willard Hall, Kansas State University, Manhattan, Kansas
- 1940 – Topeka City Hall and Topeka Performing Arts Center, (Note: A contributing resource to the South Kansas Avenue Commercial Historic District, NRHP-listed in 2015.) 215 SE 7th St and 214 SE 8th Ave, Topeka, Kansas

=== Theodore R. Griest, 1942–1946 ===
- 1947 – Mabee Memorial Hall, Baker University, Baldwin City, Kansas

=== Griest & Ekdahl, 1946–1956 ===
- 1948 – First Congregational Church, 1701 SW Collins Ave, Topeka, Kansas
- 1953 – Topeka & Shawnee County Public Library, 1515 SW 10th Ave, Topeka, Kansas
- 1954 – Lawrence High School, 1901 Louisiana St, Lawrence, Kansas
- 1955 – Menninger Foundation hospital, Topeka, Kansas
