= Coat of arms of the University of Oxford =

Heraldic symbol of British university

Versions
- The banner of arms, which serves as the University flag
- Armiger: University of Oxford
- Adopted: around 1400
- Shield: Azure, upon a book open proper leathered gules garnished or having on the dexter side seven seals of the last the words DOMINVS ILLVMINATIO MEA all between three open crowns two and one or
- Motto: Dominus Illuminatio Mea
- Use: Formal, ceremonial or informal contexts, degrees and official documents, competitions

The coat of arms of the University of Oxford depicts an open book with the inscription Dominus Illuminatio Mea (Latin for 'The Lord is my light'), surrounded by three golden crowns. It is blazoned:

Azure, upon a book open proper leathered gules garnished or having on the dexter side seven seals of the last the words DOMINVS ILLVMINATIO MEA all between three open crowns two and one or.

The arms have been in existence since about 1400, but have varied in appearance over the centuries. The number of seals and the text, for example, have both varied. The registered trademark of the University, designed in 1993, shows the arms on a cartouche circumscribed by a garter bearing the text UNIVERSITY OF OXFORD.

Fox-Davies describes three possible texts: In p'ncipia erat verbu, et verbu erat apud deu, Dominus Illuminatio Mea, and Sapienta felicitas.

In his Display of Heraldrie (1610), John Guillim interprets the arms as follows:

The Book itself some have thought to signifie that Book mentioned in the Apocalyps, having seven Seals: but these here are taken rather to be the seven Liberal Sciences, and the Crowns to be the reward and honour of Learning and Wisdome; and the triplicity of the Crowns are taken to represent the three Cardinal Professions or Faculties before specified [Theology, Physick and Law]. The Inscription I find to vary according to variety of times: some having Sapientia & Felicitate, Wisdome and Happiness; others (and that very ancient) Deus illuminatio mea, The Lord is my light; others this, Veritas liberat, bonitas regnabit, Truth frees us, Godliness crowneth us; and others thus, In principio, &c. In the beginning was the Word, and the Word was with God.

== See also ==
- Armorial of UK universities
- Dominus illuminatio mea
- University of Oxford
