= Thomas Wilson Williamson =

American architect

Thomas W. Williamson
- Born: August 4, 1887; Hiawatha, Kansas
- Died: November 16, 1974 (aged 87)
- Occupation: Architect
- Practice: Thomas W. Williamson; Thomas W. Williamson & Company; Thomas W. Williamson, Victor H. Loebsack & Associates; Williamson-Loebsack & Associates

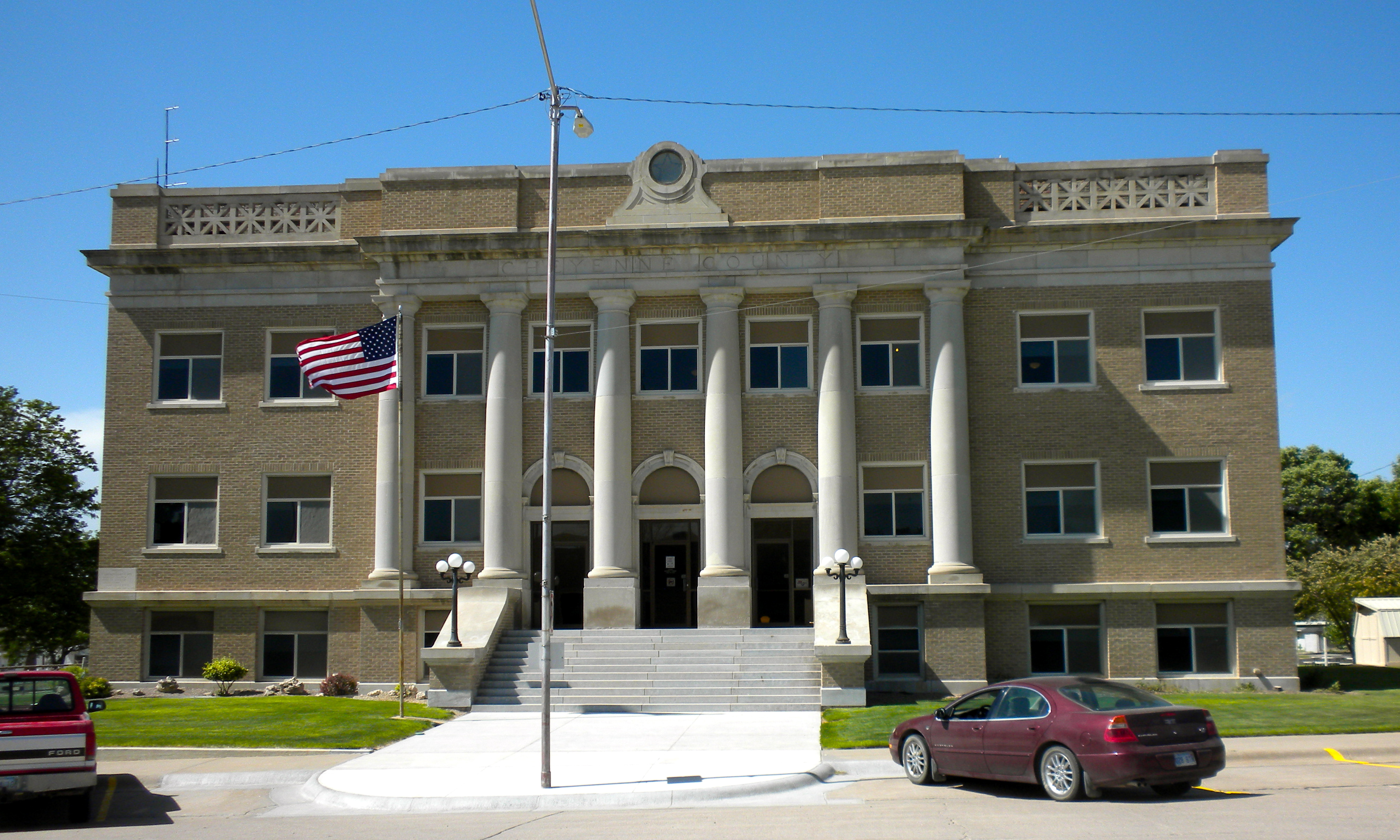
The Cheyenne County Courthouse in St. Francis, designed by Thomas W. Williamson & Company and completed in 1925.

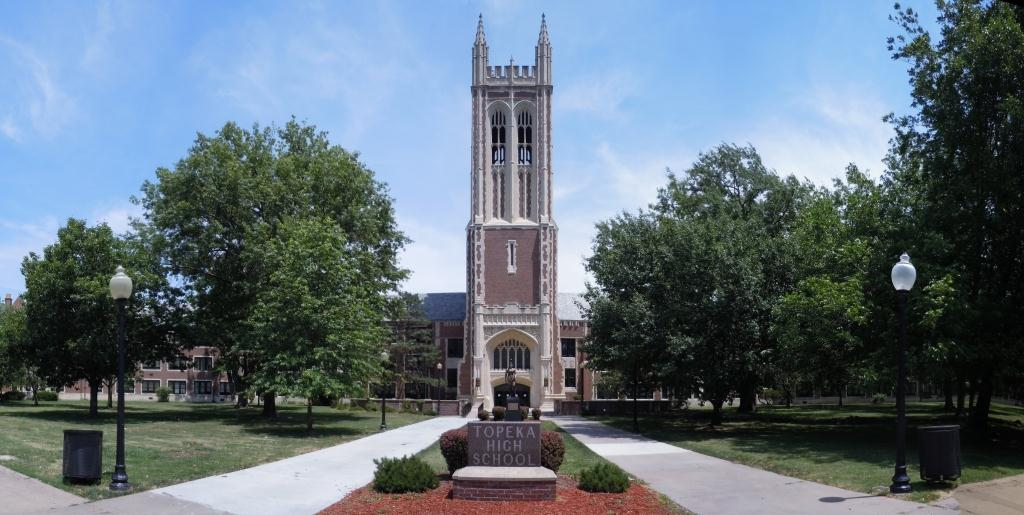
Topeka High School, designed by Theodore R. Griest for Thomas W. Williamson & Company and completed in 1931.

Thomas Wilson Williamson (August 4, 1887 – November 16, 1974) was a Kansas architect who specialized in designing school buildings in Kansas, Iowa, and Missouri.

== Life and career ==
He was born August 4, 1887 in Hiawatha, Kansas. He graduated from Topeka High School in 1907. He then attended the University of Pennsylvania and graduated with an A.B. degree from its school of architecture and returned to Kansas in 1911. He worked briefly for the Kansas state architect's office and for one year for architect John F. Stanton (whose El Dorado Carnegie Library is NRHP-listed). He then opened his own practice in 1912.

He practiced architecture for more than 50 years, designing schools and courthouses in Kansas and neighboring U.S. states. A number of his works were listed on the U.S. National Register of Historic Places for their architecture. Firm names including him operated as Thomas W. Williamson and Company, as Thomas W. Williamson, Victor H. Loebsack & Associates, and later as Williamson-Loebsack & Associates. The firm grew to a size of 46 architects, draftsmen, engineers and other specialists.

He designed schools, courthouses and the Jayhawk Theater and linked hotel in Topeka in 1926.

Williamson grew up in Topeka, Kansas and is best known for designing Topeka High School, a magnificent Perpendicular Gothic public high school, completed in 1931. Assisting Williamson was his chief designer Theodore R. Griest, and Linus Burr Smith from Kansas State College (now Kansas State University) to oversee the plans.

Williamson and Griest also designed Clay Elementary School (now Cair Paravel-Latin School), which was completed in 1926.

== Works ==
Works include (with attribution to self or firm):

- Cheyenne County Courthouse (1924–25), 212 E. Washington St., St. Francis, Kansas (Williamson, Thomas W. & Co.), NRHP-listed
- Jayhawk Hotel, Theater and Walk (1926), 700 Jackson Ave., Topeka, (Williamson, Thomas W.), NRHP-listed
- Topeka High School (1931 campus), 800 SW 10th Ave., Topeka, (Williamson, Thomas W.), NRHP-listed
- Washington Grade School (1938), 209 S. Locust St. Pittsburg, Kansas (Williamson, Thomas W. & Co.), NRHP-listed
- Central Motor and Finance Corporation Building, 222 W. 7th St., Topeka, Kansas (Williamson, Thomas W.), NRHP-listed
- Curtis Junior High School, 316 NW Grant St., Topeka, (Williamson, Thomas Wilson), NRHP-listed
- Fire Station No. 2--Topeka, 719-723 Van Buren, Topeka, (Williamson, Thomas Wilson), NRHP-listed
- Hiawatha Memorial Auditorium, 611 Utah St., Hiawatha, Kansas (Williamson, Thomas W.), NRHP-listed
- Sumner Elementary School and Monroe Elementary School, 330 Western Ave. and 1515 Monroe St., Topeka, (Williamson, Thomas W.), NRHP-listed
- Union County Courthouse, (completed 1952), 300 N Pine St, Creston, Iowa (Thomas W. Williamson, Victor H. Loebsack & Associates)

== Bibliography ==
- William Elsey Connelley, History of Kansas, State and People, (1928)
- United States Department of the Interior, National Park Service, National Register of Historic Places submission for Topeka High School, Shawnee County, Kansas, (22 April 2005)
