= Cheyenne County Courthouse (Kansas) =

- U.S. National Register of Historic Places
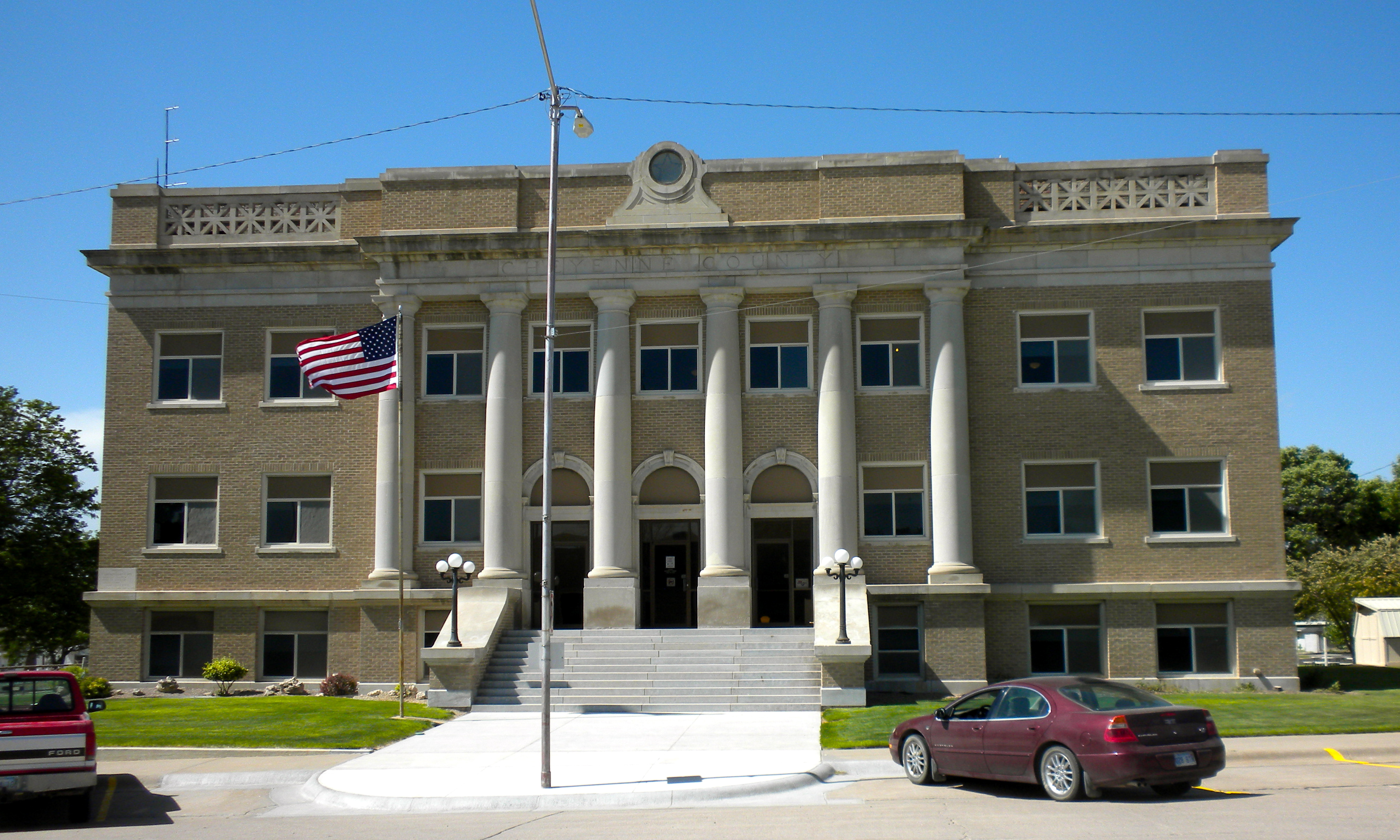

- Location within Kansas Location within the United States
- Interactive map showing the location of Cheyenne County Courthouse
- Location: 212 E. Washington St., St. Francis, Kansas
- Coordinates: 39°46′28″N 101°47′57″W
- Area: less than one acre
- Built: 1924
- Built by: Howard, Thomas D.
- Architect: Thomas W. Williamson & Co.
- Architectural style: Classical Revival
- MPS: County Courthouses of Kansas MPS
- NRHP reference No.: 02000391
- Added to NRHP: April 26, 2002

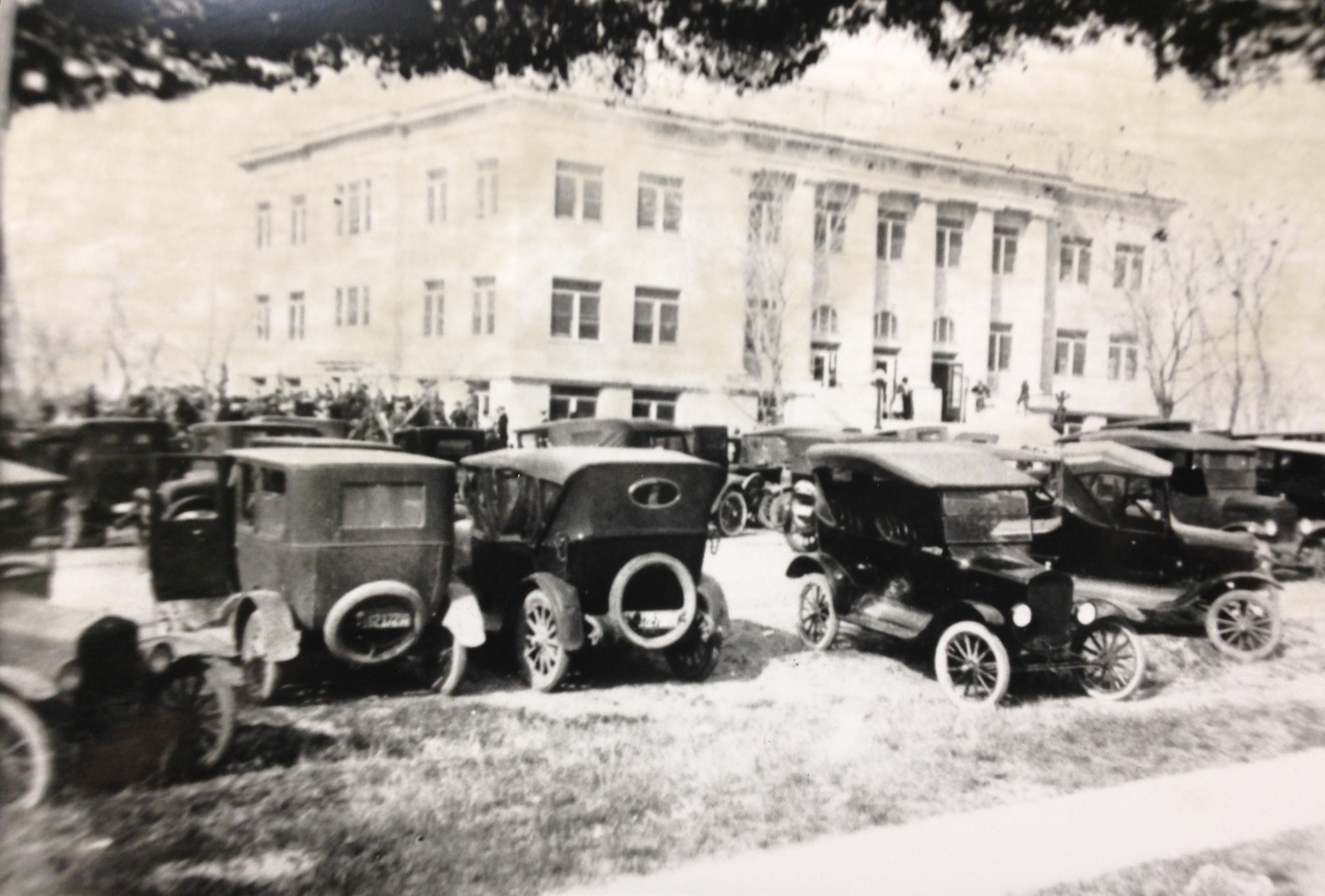

The Cheyenne County Courthouse, located at 212 E. Washington St. in St. Francis, Kansas was built during 1924–25. It was designed by Thomas W. Williamson & Co. and built by Thomas D. Howard. It was built in Classical Revival style. It was listed on the National Register of Historic Places in 2002.

It was deemed significant for association with architect Thomas W. Williamson and for association with other county courthouses in Kansas that he designed.
