= London and South East University Group =

Multi-university group in London and Kent

- Type: Public university
- Established: 1 August 2026; 2 months ago
- Budget: £601.2 million (2024/2025)
- Chancellor: YolanDa Brown
- Vice-Chancellor: Jane Harrington
- Students: 45,480 (2024/25)
- Undergraduates: 32,775 (2024/25)
- Postgraduates: 12,705 (2024/25)
- Location: Canterbury, London, Medway, United Kingdom
- Campus: Multiple sites
- Website: lase.ac.uk

The London and South East University Group (LASE) is a university, referred to as a multi-university group or a super-university', formed by the merger of the University of Greenwich and the University of Kent in August 2026. The founding vice-chancellor and CEO is Jane Harrington, previously vice-chancellor of the University of Greenwich.

The two universities are now formally academic division of LASE, operating under trading names. They have retained their own identities, courses and campuses, and degrees continue to be awarded by LASE under their respective names. There is a single governing body, executive team and academic board. The merged institution has a similar number of students to the University of Manchester at around 47,000, a similar number of academic staff to Manchester Metropolitan University at around 2,500, similar income to Newcastle University at around £600 million, and similar expenditure to the University of Warwick at around £570 million.

== History ==
Kent and Greenwich had over two decades of collaboration at their shared Medway campus prior to the merger, which started with their joint Medway School of Pharmacy in 2004, giving them practical experience of working together. At the time of the merger announcement, commentators noted that the proposal already addressed the main cause of failures in higher education mergers: who would be the head of the new institution. Kent did not have a permanent vice-chancellor in place at that time of the announcement and continued to be led by its interim vice-chancellor, Georgina Randsley de Moura, until the merger was completed. However, questions did remain to be solved, include how degree awarding powers, and submissions to the Research Excellence Framework and Teaching Excellence Framework awards would be handled.

The Office for Students, the higher education regulatory agency for England, supported the merger and said that this might be an option other institutions might pursue due to the ongoing crisis in university finances. The British government Department for Education also welcomed the merger, although the Universities and Colleges Union noted that staff and students would be alarmed, with their general secretary describing the merger as a takeover by Greenwich due to Kent being at "the brink of insolvency".

The announcement was widely covered in the news media, including BBC News, The Guardian, The Times, The Independent, The Financial Times and Times Higher Education. The multi-university group model, similar to the multi-academy trusts found in the school sector, was something that the higher education sector had been exploring for a while, with Universities UK having previously noted that universities do not have a lot of experience in this kind of arrangement. As the first implementation of this model in England, the merger was described as "something of a watershed moment" that could lead to other institutions following similar models.

The merger was effected on 1 August 2026 by changing the name of the corporation of the University of Greenwich to London and South East University Group, and transferring all of the assets and liabilities of the University of Kent to that corporation.

== Organisation ==
The university group is a single corporation, rather than a corporate group, incorporated as a company limited by guarantee. The corporation takes in both the University of Greenwich and the University of Kent, which form its academic divisions. It has a unified governance structure, with a single board of governors, vice-chancellor, executive team, and academic board, rather than each university within the group having their governance structure. The group holds the degree-awarding power of the institution, and has been permitted by the Office for Students to award degrees under the names of the University of Kent and the University of Greenwich. LASE is also the institution registered as a university with the Office for Students.

The board of governors has between 11 and 17 members, including the vice-chancellor and CEO as an ex officio member, two staff representatives (one from Kent and one from Greenwich), two student representatives (one from Kent and one from Greenwich) and six to twelve independent governors, such that independent governors always form the majority. As of August 2026, the chair of the boardis Mark Preston, former chair of the University of Kent; the vice-chair, Craig McWilliam, is the former chair of the University of Greenwich.

The teaching and research of the university, including academic quality, the admission and regulation of students, and the award of degrees, is overseen by the academic board of LASE. However, students apply to, are taught at, and receive degrees in the name of, one of the universities within the group.
