= University of Greenwich =

Public university in Greenwich, London, England

- Coat of arms
- Former names: Woolwich Polytechnic (1890–1970); Thames Polytechnic (1970–1992)
- Motto: Latin: Discere, Agere, Conficere
- Motto in English: "To learn, to do, to achieve"
- Type: Public university
- Established: 1890; 136 years ago – Woolwich Polytechnic; 1992; 34 years ago – university status
- Affiliations: University Alliance; Universities UK; Association of Commonwealth Universities; EUA
- Budget: £332.5 million (2024/2025)
- Chancellor: YolanDa Brown (as chancellor of LASE)
- Vice-Chancellor: Jane Harrington (as vice-chancellor of LASE)
- Students: 29,410 (2024/25)
- Undergraduates: 19,435 (2024/25)
- Postgraduates: 9,975 (2024/25)
- Location: London, United Kingdom; 51.483372°N 0.006075°W
- Campus: Multiple sites
- Colours: Blue
- Website: gre.ac.uk

The University of Greenwich (formerly Woolwich Polytechnic and Thames Polytechnic) is a university within the London and South East University Group (LASE) in Greenwich, England. It was an independent university from 1992 to 2026, when it merged with the University of Kent to form LASE. Following the merger, Greenwich became an academic division within LASE, operating under the branding of the University of Greenwich, while LASE's academic board became responsible for the admission of students, teaching and granting degrees. However, students apply to, are taught at, and receive degrees in the name of, the University of Greenwich.

The university's main campus is at the Old Royal Naval College, which, along with its Avery Hill campus, is located in the Royal Borough of Greenwich. Greenwich also has a campus in Medway, Kent, as part of a shared campus. The university's range of subjects includes architecture, business, computing, mathematics, education, engineering, humanities, maritime studies, natural sciences, pharmacy and social sciences.

== History ==
The university dates back to 1890, when Woolwich Polytechnic, the second-oldest polytechnic in the United Kingdom, opened in Woolwich. It was founded by Frank Didden, supported by and following the principles of Quintin Hogg, and opened to students in October 1891. Like Hogg's pioneering venture in London's Regent Street, it initially combined education with social and religious functions.

In 1894 it focused on an educational role, concentrating on higher technical education appropriate to its location close to Woolwich Dockyard and the Royal Arsenal; William Anderson, director-general of the Ordnance Factories, was a trustee and later a member of the board of governors. Its premises were also used for day schools – the first Woolwich Polytechnic School was established in 1897.

In 1970, Woolwich Polytechnic merged with part of Hammersmith College of Art and Building to form Thames Polytechnic. In the following years, Dartford College (1976), Avery Hill College of Education (1985), Garnett College (1987), and parts of Goldsmiths College and the City of London College (1988) were incorporated.

In 1992, Thames Polytechnic was granted university status by the Major government (together with various other polytechnics) and renamed the University of Greenwich in 1993. On 1 January 1993, the Thames College of Health Care Studies, itself a merger of three local nursing and midwifery training schools, officially merged with the newly designated University of Greenwich, becoming a full faculty of the university.

Formerly a UK government research agency, the Natural Resources Institute (NRI) was incorporated into the university in 1996.

In 2001, the university gave up its historic main campus in the Bathway Quarter in Woolwich, relocating to its current main campus in Greenwich.

In 2018, the University of Greenwich started a partnership with Charlton Athletic F.C.

In 2019, the university's main cafeteria was operated by BaxterStorey, which paid its workers £9.25 per hour without contractual sick pay. After four strike days in October 2019, University of Greenwich announced in early January 2020 that all outsourced cafe workers, cleaners and security guards would receive the London living wage of £10.55, in addition to the same sick pay and annual leave as university staff.

On 1 August 2026 the university merged with the University of Kent to form the London and South East University Group. The name of the corporation of the University of Greenwich was changed to that of the new university group, and all of the assets and liabilities of the University of Kent were transferred to that corporation.

== Organisation ==
Academic disciplines at Greenwich are organised into four faculties, which host a range of subject expertise within them:

- Faculty of Law, Arts and Social Sciences
- Business School
- Faculty of Education, Health and Human Sciences
- Faculty of Engineering and Science

The university also has a number of professional service directorates that support students and the Faculties.

The university is an academic division within LASE, operating under a trading name as the University of Greenwich. LASE holds the degree-awarding power of the institution, and has been permitted by the Office for Students to award degrees under the name of the University of Greenwich. The teaching and research of the university, including academic quality, the admission and regulation of students and the award of degrees, is overseen by the academic board of LASE.

== Campuses ==
=== Greenwich ===
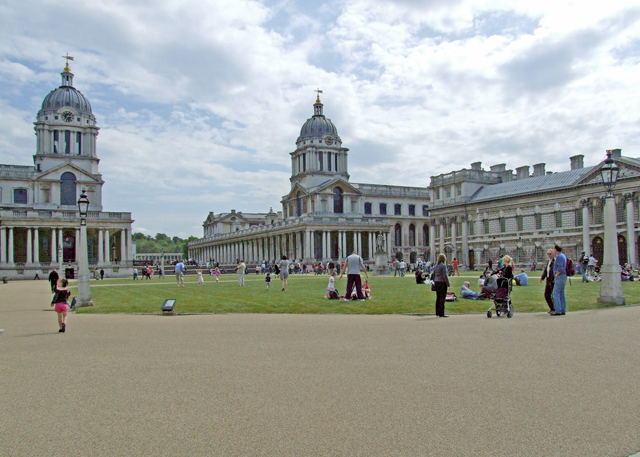
Greenwich Campus

The Greenwich campus is mainly located in the Old Royal Naval College. The university moved into the college in 1999 on a 145-year lease, following its transfer to the Greenwich Foundation in 1997. The university is one of a number of organisations housed in the college, and mainly uses the Queen Anne, Queen Mary and King William courts. The Old Royal Naval College's Painted Hall is used by the university for graduations.

The campus is home to the business school, the faculty of law, arts and social sciences, and the faculty of education, health and human sciences.

The campus houses the university’s Stockwell Street Library. Other facilities on campus include specialist computer laboratories, a TV studio, and editing suites. The Stephen Lawrence Gallery, in the Stockwell Street building, showcases the work of contemporary artists and is linked to the School of Design.

The Dreadnought Building hosts Greenwich Students' Union. It has psychology and neuroscience laboratories, an early years simulated classroom, a gym, a bar, a cafe, computer laboratories, and teaching and social spaces for students. The building was formerly the Dreadnought Seaman's hospital, named after the quarantine and hospital ship HMS Dreadnought which was moored on the Thames at Greenwich in the mid-19th century. HMS Dreadnought had previously been a ship of the line and fought at the Battle of Trafalgar.

The Old Royal Naval College – now part of the University of Greenwich – on the south bank of the river Thames in Greenwich, London, viewed from the north. Between the two college buildings is the Queen's House. On the skyline directly behind the Queen’s House stands a statue of General James Wolfe, with the Royal Observatory and its red time ball just visible past the trees to its right.

=== Avery Hill ===
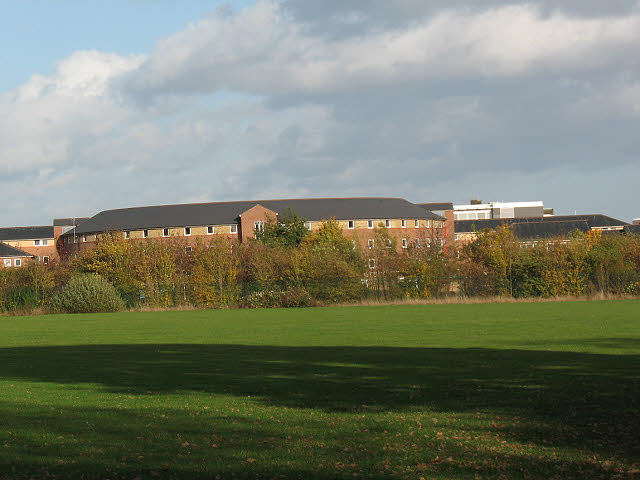
Avery Hill Campus

The Avery Hill Campus is situated in Eltham, south of the 86 acres (35 ha) Avery Hill Park in the Royal Borough of Greenwich, south-east London. The campus is home to student accommodation and to the Faculty of Education, Health & Human Sciences. Courses taught at the site include: Teacher Training, Nursing (Adult, Child, Mental Health, Community, Learning Disability), Midwifery, Paramedic Science, Speech and Language Therapy, Physiotherapy, PE and Sport, and Sports Science.

Facilities include a 220-seat lecture theatre, computer laboratories, a library, sports pitches, strength and conditioning laboratories, and a sports hall.

The site also hosts the Greenwich Learning and Simulation Centre (GLASC), which replicates NHS wards, a critical care unit, a simulated pediatric and birthing centre, and an operating theatre. GLASC enables student trainees and experienced health professionals to gain hands-on experience and learn new clinical skills by engaging in multi-professional simulation activities.

The student village complex at Avery Hill provides student self-catering accommodation, a general shop, and a launderette. The Dome, in the centre of the complex, houses a food outlet and gym. Rugby, football, indoor pitches, netball, and tennis courts are also on the Avery Hill campus.

The facility, which was built by Wimpey Construction under a PFI contract, was completed in 1996.

=== Medway ===
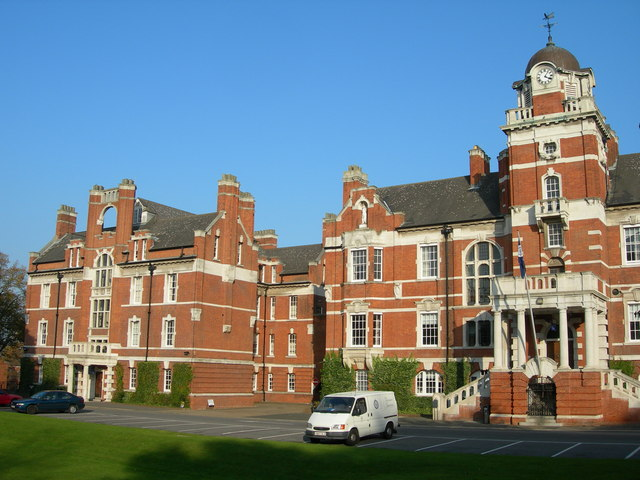
Medway Campus

The Medway Campus is located on a former Royal Navy shorebase (called HMS Pembroke) opened in 1903 at Chatham Maritime, Kent.

The Faculty of Engineering and Science is based here, as is the Natural Resources Institute, a centre for research, consultancy and education in natural and human resources. It is also the home of Medway School of Pharmacy, a joint school operated by the Universities of Greenwich and Kent. The Faculty of Education, Health & Human Sciences also offers a number of its courses at Medway, including Midwifery and Paramedic Sciences. Facilities include laboratories, workshops, a computer-aided design studio, and a training dispensary.

The Drill Hall Library has computers, study areas, and teaching rooms. Social facilities include a sports hall, bar, gym, and outdoor tennis courts. The university is a member of Universities at Medway, a partnership of educational establishments at Chatham Maritime that is developing the area as a major higher education centre in the Medway region.

== Research ==
University of Greenwich research aims to influence and enhance health, education, science, engineering, computing, and social policy, and attracts international agencies, government departments, and global corporations from over 50 countries. Areas of research and consultancy include landscape architecture, employment relations, fire safety, natural resources, tourism and hospitality, social network analysis, education, training, educational leadership, and public services.

The Greenwich Maritime Centre, established in 1998, is a specialist postgraduate and research institute within the university. Focused on the study of maritime history, it is located in The Old Royal Naval College, Greenwich, across the road from the National Maritime Museum.

== Reputation and rankings ==
Rankings
National rankings
- Complete (2027): 106
- Guardian (2027): 119
- Times / Sunday Times (2027): 100

Global rankings
- ARWU (2026): 701–800
- QS (2027): 691–700
- THE (2026): 601–800

In 2019, the university was ranked 14th in UK, and third in London by People & Planet Green League Table. The university has gained many national awards, including four Queen's Anniversary Prizes, nine Times Higher Education Awards and two Guardian University Awards.

In 2019, the university's Natural Resources Institute was awarded a Queen's Anniversary Prize for its research in pest management and control to combat human and animal diseases in the UK and internationally; in 2015 it won a prize for work on the cassava crop in Africa.

In 2023, the university was classified as Gold in Teaching Excellence Framework (TEF) of Higher Education.

The university was ranked 94 out of 121 UK institutions according to The Guardian University Guide 2022 league table. For 2023, the University of Greenwich was ranked 60 according to Times Higher Education (THE). Moreover, the University of Greenwich ranked first in London for Events, Tourism and Hospitality by the 2023 Guardian university rankings. Subjects taught at Greenwich have seen rises in the Guardian university league tables for 2022: Chemistry was at 10, up 10 places since 2021. Forensic Science (9), Criminology (10), Mechanical Engineering (12), and Education (48) also moved up significantly.

In Center for World University Rankings World University Rankings 2020–21 – University of Greenwich was ranked 76 in the UK. In 2022, University of Greenwich was ranked in the 750-800 range globally by QS World University Rankings.

In the Times Higher Education (THE) Impact Rankings 2020, which assessed universities' impact on society and the planet, the University of Greenwich was ranked as follows in these categories:

- Responsible Consumption and Production (24th)
- Life on Land (66th)
- Reduced Inequalities (68th)
- Climate Action (75th)
- Partnership for the Goals (77th)

== Partnership ==
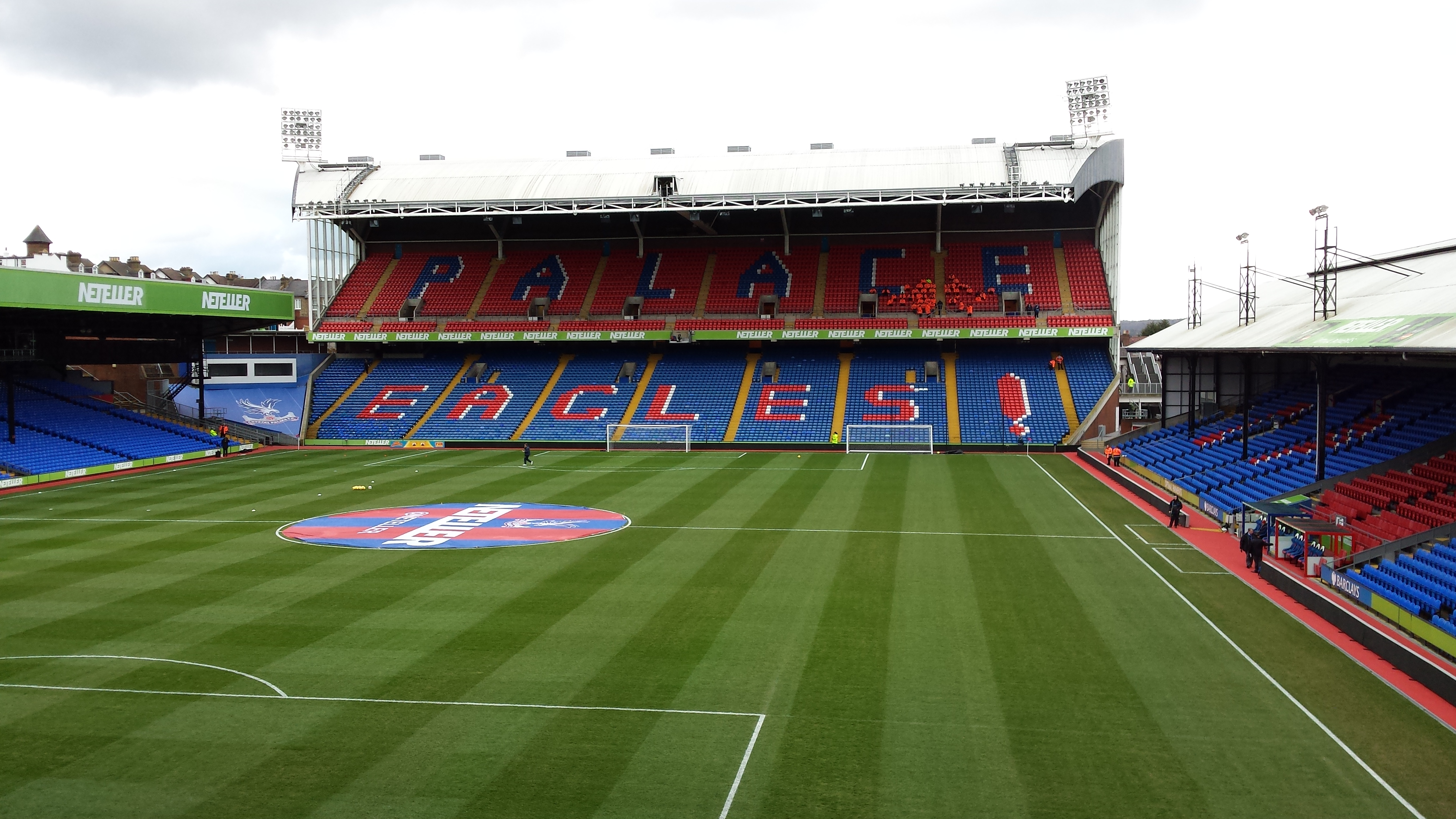
Crystal Palace FC Home – Selhurst Park football stadium in South Norwood

On 7 October 2025, the University of Greenwich became the official higher education partner for Crystal Palace Football Club.

== Student life ==
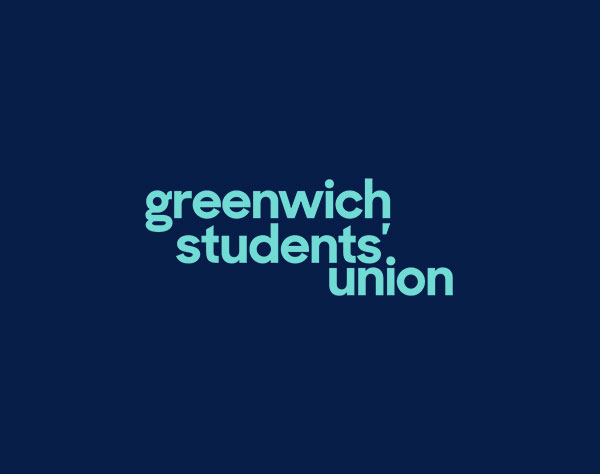
Greenwich Students' Union Logo

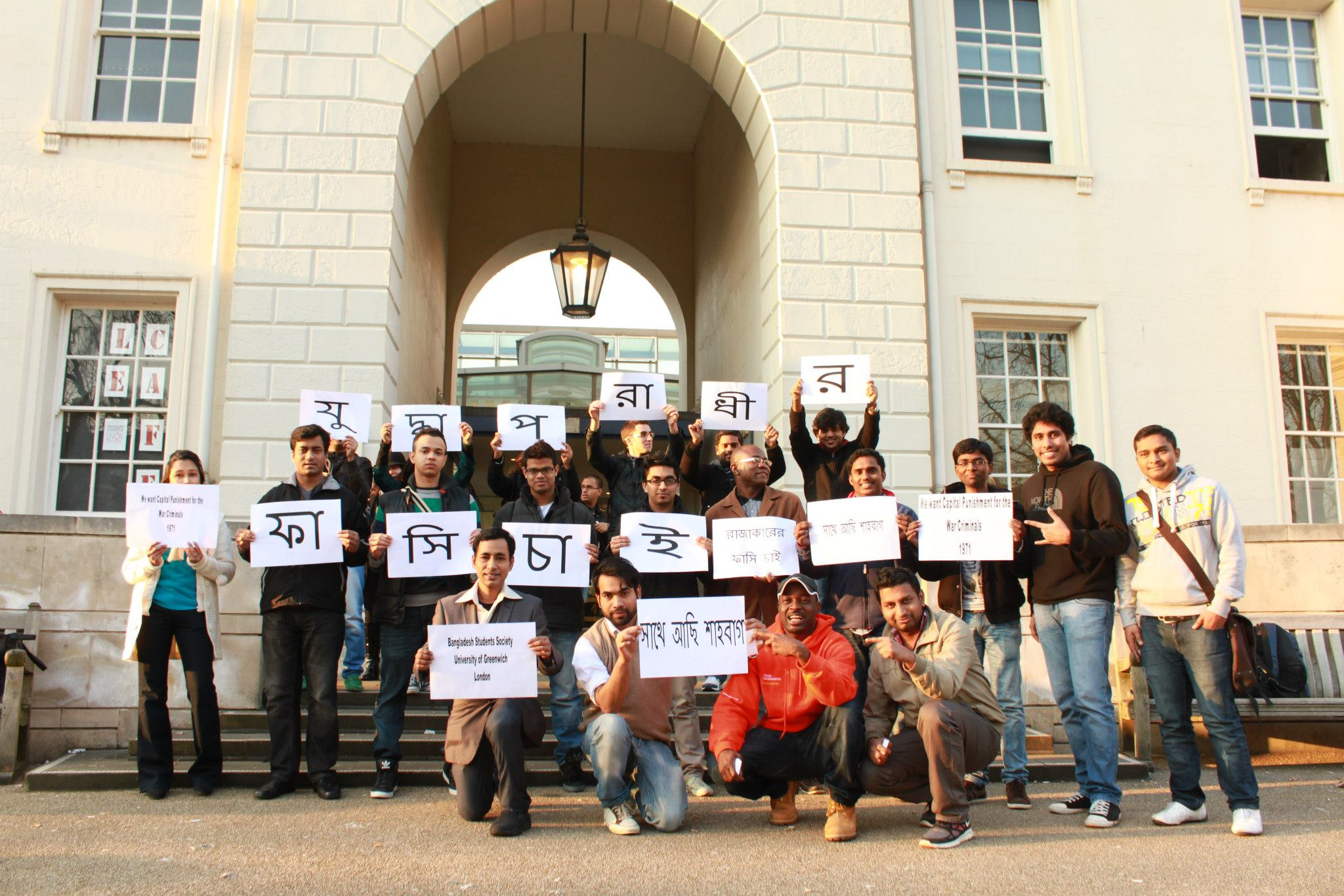
Bangladesh students' society

Greenwich Campus is near 74-hectare Greenwich Park, home to the Royal Observatory, Greenwich. The Stockwell Street Building opened in 2014 and is now home to the campus library, film and TV studios, and editing suites. In 2015, it was shortlisted for the Stirling Prize for architecture.

The Dreadnought Building is a central hub for the Greenwich Campus and hosts the Greenwich Students' Union and Student Services. Some parts of the other buildings in the Greenwich Campus are Queen Anne Court, King William Court, Queen Mary Court, Stephen Lawrence Building and Stockwell Street Library.

The Student Village at Avery Hill Campus provides accommodation for around 1,000 students. On-site facilities include a café, canteen, shop, launderette, bicycle parking, and a gym.

Medway Campus has 350 rooms across five halls of residence dedicated to student accommodation.

== Students' Union ==
Greenwich Students' Union is the university's students' union. In October 2019, the GSU Student Assembly voted to ask the university to declare a climate emergency and for the university and union sustainability strategies to consult with students in creating them. This call to action aimed to speed up the university's efforts at becoming carbon neutral.

At the Medway campus in Kent, there is a partnership between the University of Greenwich Students' Union, Canterbury Christ Church, and University of Kent Union on the Medway campus. Greenwich Students' Union has been leading the partnership since July 2021 and manages The Hub space, previously The Student Hub, when it was looked after by GK Unions – the Greenwich & Kent Students' Unions Together (once the Universities at Medway Students Association, UMSA). Greenwich Students' Union has a mascot called The Cutty Shark and a presence at the Avery Hill, Greenwich, and Medway campuses.

== Notable alumni ==
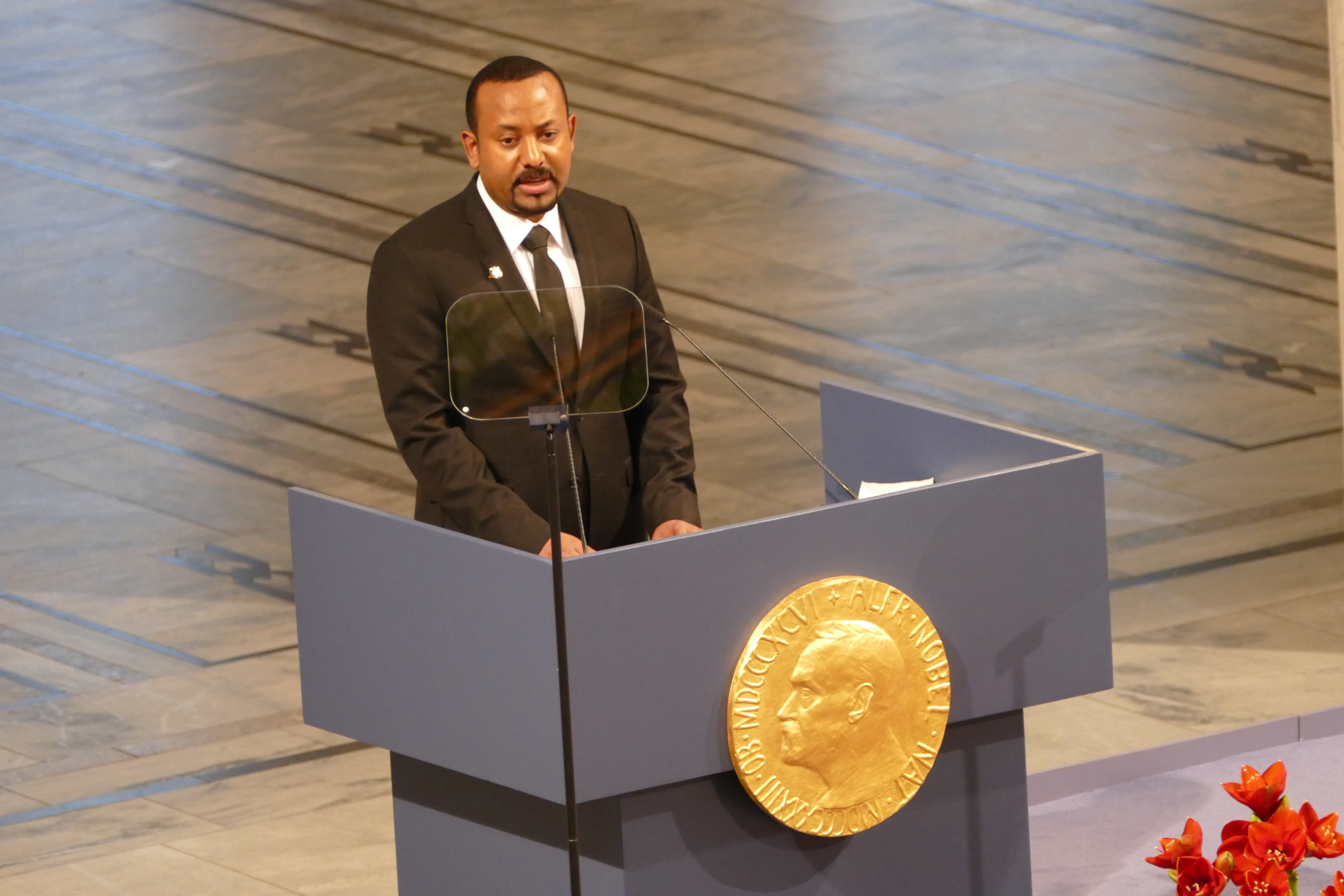
Abiy Ahmed is Prime Minister of Ethiopia and a Nobel Peace Prize winner

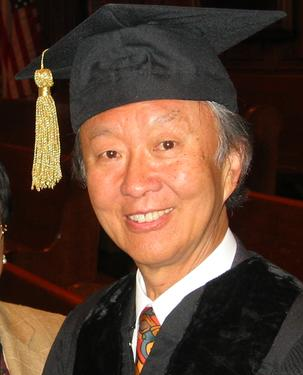
Charles Kao, awarded the Nobel Prize in Physics in 2009

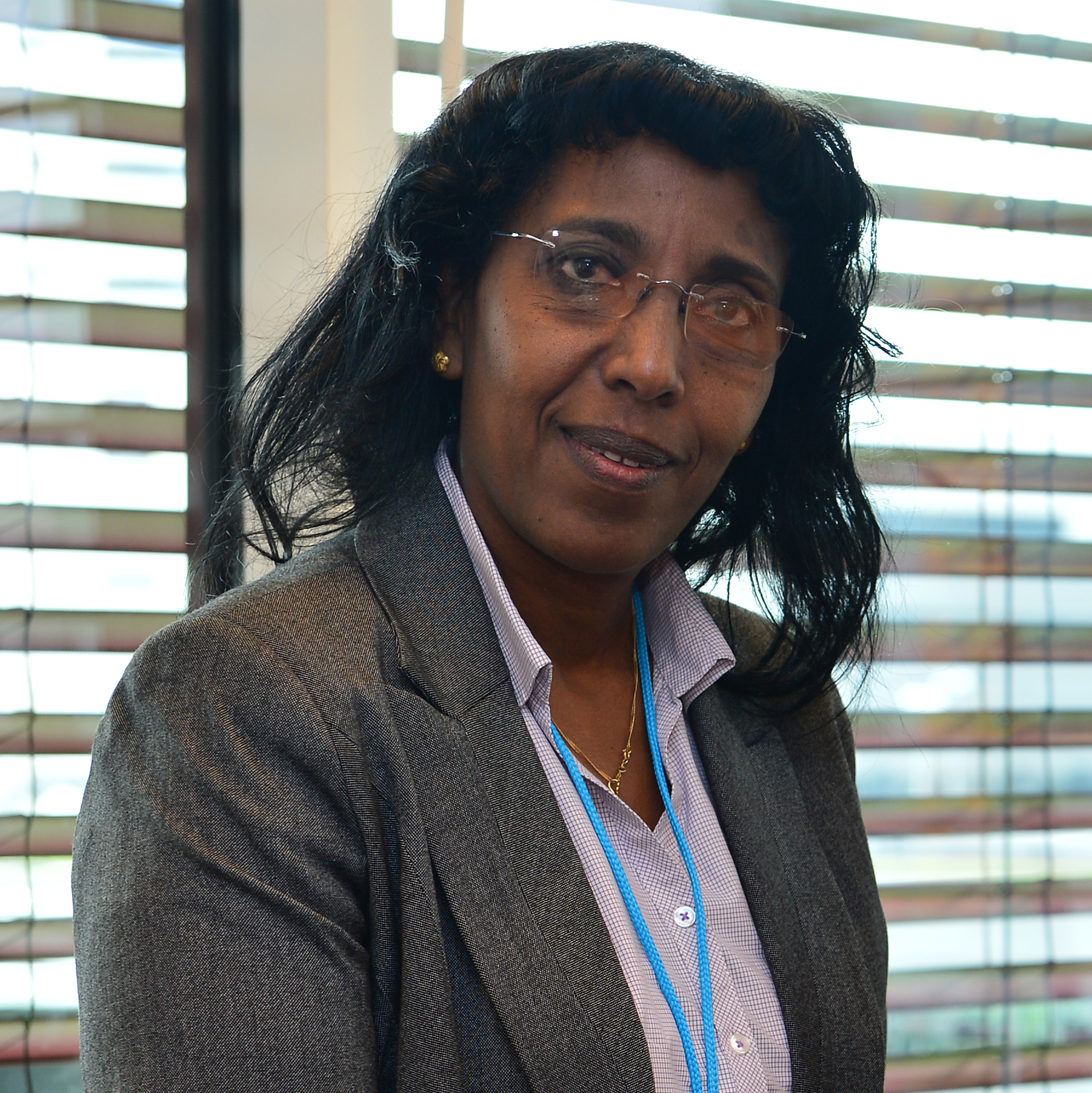
Demitu Hambisa Bonsa

Prominent alumni of the university and its predecessor organisations include Nobel Laureate Charles Kao, who was awarded the Nobel Prize in Physics in 2009 for his work on transmission of light in fibre optics, and Abiy Ahmed, who won the 2019 Nobel Peace Prize. In June 2021, representatives from multiple countries called for the award of the Nobel Peace Prize to Abiy to be re-considered because of the war crimes committed in Tigray. Two British government ministers, Richard Marsh and Gareth Thomas, are also graduates. A more extensive list is given below.

- Catherine Agbaje, television personality
- Abiy Ahmed, Prime Minister of Ethiopia and Nobel Peace Prize winner
- Jamie 'JME' Adenuga, MC
- Bola Agbaje, playwright
- Helen Bailey, writer
- Natasha Bedingfield, pop singer (did not graduate)
- John Behr, theologian
- Malorie Blackman, children's author
- Demitu Hambisa Bonsa, Ethiopian government minister
- John Boyega, actor, best known for Star Wars: The Force Awakens
- Sheila Bromberg, musician
- Liam Brown, author
- Campbell Christie, chairman of Falkirk F.C.
- Terry Christian, radio and television presenter
- Mark Daly, Irish senator
- Siobhan Dowd, writer (A Swift Pure Cry)
- Sarah Eberle, garden designer
- Jenni Fagan, author
- Leo Fortune-West, professional footballer
- Sarah Gillespie, singer-songwriter
- Pippa Guard, actress
- Andrey Guryev (born 1982), Russian entrepreneur
- Gareth Hale, comedian
- Patrick Harrington, politician in the National Front (1979–1989) and currently Third Way (UK) think tank; general secretary of Solidarity – The Union for British Workers
- Rachael Heyhoe-Flint, cricketer
- Roy Hodgson, England and Premier League football manager
- Dermot Hudson, left-wing political activist
- Brian Jacks, 1972 Summer Olympics bronze medallist in Judo
- Mark Jackson, musician (VNV Nation)
- Danielle Jawando, author
- Charles K. Kao, Nobel Prize winning scientist
- Graham Kendrick, Christian worship leader
- Sammy Lee, IVF specialist
- Pablo Daniel Magee, writer, journalist and playwright
- Richard Marsh, Baron Marsh, politician
- Ian McAllister, Distinguished Professor, Australian National University
- Rui Moreira, Portuguese politician and businessman; mayor of Porto
- Chinenye Ochuba, former Most Beautiful Girl in Nigeria
- Sarah Ockwell-Smith, childcare author
- Joy Onumajuru, model and philanthropist
- Norman Pace, comedian
- Ann Packer, 1964 Summer Olympics gold medallist
- Lara Pulver, Olivier Award-nominated dancer and actress
- Richard Pybus, cricket coach
- George Rose, businessman
- Dave Rowntree, musician (Blur)
- Etienne Schneider, Deputy Prime Minister of Luxembourg
- Peter Skinner, MEP
- Aramazd Stepanian, playwright
- William G. Stewart, TV presenter (Fifteen to One)
- Nina Stibbe, author
- Adelle Stripe, author
- Gareth Thomas, politician
- Ewen Whitaker, lunar astronomer (alumnus of Woolwich Polytechnic)
- Joel Willans, author and copywriter of works in Finland.
- Brian Willsher, abstract wood and bronze sculptor

== Coat of arms ==
Coat of arms of University of Greenwich
Adopted 7 December 1990 Crest Statant within a Coronet the finials composed of Roses and Escallops reversed alternately Or an Owl Gules Escutcheon Barry wavy of six Argent and Azure upon a Pale Sable a Gun Barrel erect surmounted on the breach by a Lion's Face Or on a Chief Gules an Open Book proper bound Or between on the dexter a Cog Wheel and on the sinister a Capital of a Doric Column both Or Supporters Dexter a Horse Argent in front of a Cedar Tree proper and sinister a Lion Or in front of an Oak Tree proper on a Compartment comprising a Grassy Mount proper Motto Discere, Agere, Conficere (To learn, to do, to achieve)

== See also ==
- Armorial of UK universities
- Baron Boateng
- List of universities in the United Kingdom
- Post-1992 universities
