= Dominus illuminatio mea =

Opening words of Psalm 27

Arms of the University of Oxford, including the motto

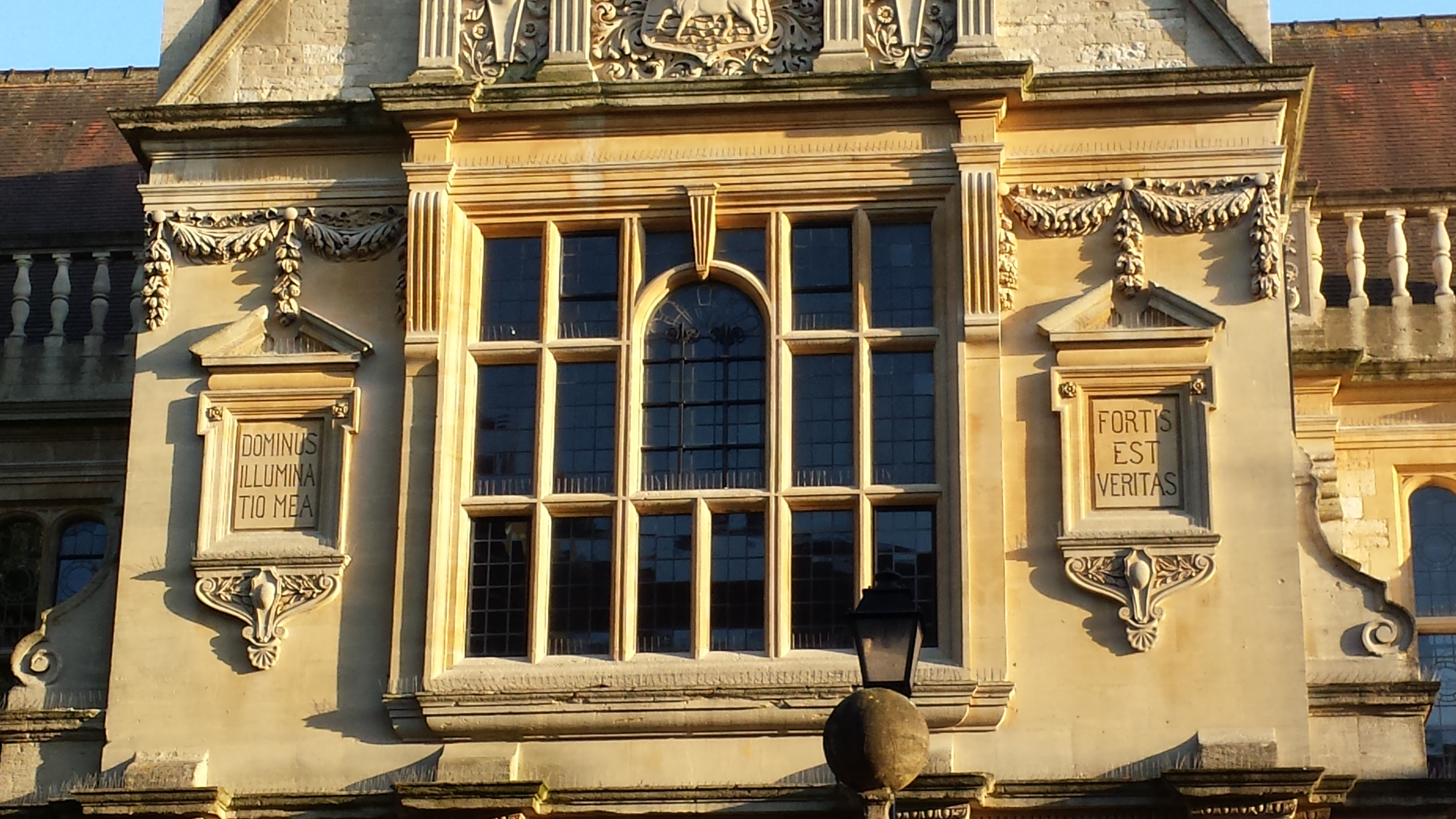
At the University of Oxford's Faculty of History, the motto can be seen at left.

Dominus illuminatio mea (English: 'The Lord is my light') is the incipit of Psalm 27 and is used by the University of Oxford as its motto. It has been in use there since at least the second half of the sixteenth century, and it appears in the coat of arms of the university.

An article written in 2000 by the Roman Catholic priest and theologian Ivan Illich (1926–2002) may help to explain this ancient university motto, at a time when scientists were progressively replacing the concept of vision as a gaze radiating from the pupil by the concept of vision as the retinal perception of an image formed by reflected sunlight:

To interpret De oculo morali, the relationship of things to God "who is light" must be understood. This is the century [i.e., the thirteenth century] suffused by the idea that the world rests in God's hands, that it is contingent on Him. This means that at every instant everything derives its existence from his continued creative act. Things radiate by virtue of their constant dependence on this creative act. They are alight by the God-derived luminescence of their truth.

== Other uses ==
Dominus illuminatio mea is also the motto of Loyola High School (Kolkata) in India, founded in 1961.

In the US, it is the motto of Cair Paravel-Latin School, a private college-preparatory school in Topeka, Kansas. It is also used by St Leo's College, University of Queensland.

In Hong Kong, it is the motto of Marymount Secondary School.
