= East Union Community School District =

Public school district in Afton, Iowa, United States

Location
- Afton, Iowa Union, Ringgold, Madison, and Clarke counties United States
- Coordinates: 41.024793°N 94.179931°W

District information
- Type: Local school district
- Grades: K-12
- Established: 1960
- Superintendent: Ken Kasper
- Schools: 2
- Budget: $9,338,000 (2020-21)
- NCES District ID: 1910350

Students and staff
- Students: 495 (2022-23)
- Teachers: 39.22 FTE
- Staff: 54.99 FTE
- Student–teacher ratio: 12.62
- Athletic conference: Pride of Iowa
- District mascot: Eagles
- Colors: Blue, Navy, and White

Other information
- Website: www.eastunionschools.org

East Union Community School District is a rural public school district headquartered in Afton, Iowa.

The district is mostly in Union County, with small portions in Clarke, Madison, and Ringgold counties. Communities in its service area, in addition to Afton, include Arispe, Lorimor, Shannon City, and Thayer.

The district mascot is the Eagles, and their colors are blue, navy, and white.

== History ==
The district was formed in 1960 through the consolidation of schools in Afton, Arispe, Shannon City, Lorimor and Thayer.

Ken Kasper has served as Superintendent since 2018, after serving as the secondary school principal at Alburnett Community School District.

== Schools ==
The district operates two schools, located on a single campus in Afton:

- East Union Elementary School
- East Union High School

=== East Union High School ===
==== Athletics ====
The Eagles compete in the Pride of Iowa Conference in the following sports:

- Football
- Volleyball
- Cross Country
- Basketball
- Wrestling
- Bowling
- Golf
- Track and Field
- Baseball
- Softball

== See also ==
- List of school districts in Iowa
- List of high schools in Iowa
