= Talmage, Iowa =

- Unincorporated community
- Location within Iowa
- Coordinates: 41°01′37″N 94°06′43″W
- Country: United States
- State: Iowa
- County: Union
- Elevation: 1,073 ft (327 m)
- Time zone: UTC-6 (Central (CST))
  - Summer (DST): UTC-5 (CDT)
- Area code: 641
- GNIS feature ID: 464771

Talmage is an unincorporated community in Jones Township, Union County, Iowa, United States. Talmage is located along U.S. routes 34 and 169, 4.5 miles (7.2 km) east of Afton.

== History ==
Founded in the 1800s, Talmage's population was 42 in 1902, and 79 in 1925. The population was 120 in 1940.
