= New Hope Township =

New Hope Township may refer to:

- New Hope Township, Izard County, Arkansas, in Izard County, Arkansas
- New Hope Township, Union County, Iowa, in Union County, Iowa
- New Hope Township, Chatham County, North Carolina, in Chatham County, North Carolina
- New Hope Township, Iredell County, North Carolina
- New Hope Township, Perquimans County, North Carolina, in Perquimans County, North Carolina
- New Hope Township, Randolph County, North Carolina, in Randolph County, North Carolina
- New Hope Township, Wayne County, North Carolina, in Wayne County, North Carolina
