= Grand River Bridge =

Grand River Bridge may refer to:

- Grand River Bridge (Ontario), Canada
- Grand River Bridge (Arispe, Iowa), U.S.
- Grand River Bridge (Leon, Iowa), U.S.

== See also ==
- Grand River (disambiguation)
- Interstate 90 Grand River bridges
