= Dan M. Nee =

American athlete, coach and politician (1888–1952)

Biographical details
- Born: April 1, 1888; Thayer, Iowa, U.S.
- Died: June 9, 1952 (aged 64); Kansas City, Missouri, U.S.

Playing career

Football
- 1908: Missouri

Baseball
- 1909: Missouri
- 1909: Springfield Midgets
- 1911: Nebraska City Forresters
- Positions: End (football); First baseman (baseball)

Coaching career (HC unless noted)

Football
- 1909: Missouri (freshmen)
- 1912–1916: Drury

Basketball
- 1912–1917: Drury

Track and field
- 1912–1917: Drury

Head coaching record
- Overall: 16–18–1 (football); 16–18–1 (basketball)

Daniel M. Nee Sr. (April 1, 1888 – June 9, 1952) was an American athlete, sports coach, lawyer, politician, and government administrator. Nee coached football, basketball, and track and field at Drury College—now known as Drury University—in Springfield, Missouri.

Nee was born April 1, 1888, in Thayer, Iowa. He played college football and college baseball at the University of Missouri. As a junior in the fall of 1909, Nee was ineligible to play for Missouri because he had played professional baseball that summer. Instead, he and his brother, John, coached the freshman football team.

Nee coached the basketball team at Drury from 1912 to 1917, compiling a record of 41–22 in five seasons. He resigned from his post at Drury in 1917 and became the assistant prosecuting attorney for Greene County, Missouri.

Nee was college of internal revenue for western Missouri from 1933 to 1948. He resigned in 1948 to run in the 1948 Missouri gubernatorial election, losing the Democratic Party primary to Forrest Smith. Nee died on June 9, 1952, at Saint Luke's Hospital in Kansas City.

== Head coaching record ==
=== College football ===
Year	Team	Overall	Conference	Standing	Bowl/playoffs
Drury Panthers (Missouri Intercollegiate Athletic Association) (1912–1916)
1912	Drury	6–2			
1913	Drury	2–3			
1914	Drury	3–5			
1915	Drury	1–5	0–3	9th	
1916	Drury	4–3–1	1–2–1	T–6th	
Drury:		16–18–1			
Total:		16–18–1			
