= Murray Community School District =

Public school district in Murray, Iowa, United States

Coordinates: 41.039061°N 93.954244°W

Location
- Murray, Iowa Clarke, Union, and Decatur counties United States

District information
- Type: Public
- Grades: K–12
- Superintendent: Tim Kuehl
- Schools: 2
- Budget: $4,292,000
- NCES District ID: 1920100

Students and staff
- Students: 298 (2022-23)
- Teachers: 26.26 FTE
- Staff: 27.36 FTE
- Student–teacher ratio: 11.35
- Athletic conference: Bluegrass
- District mascot: Mustang
- Colors: Purple, Gold, and White

Other information
- Website: www.murraycsd.org

The Murray Community School District is a rural public school district headquartered in Murray, Iowa.

== Location ==
The district is mainly in western Clarke County, with smaller areas in Union and Decatur counties. The district serves the city of Murray, and surrounding rural areas.

== Governance ==
As of July 1, 2020, the (a) East Union (EUCSD) and (b) Murray Community School Districts (MCSD) have a 50/50 shared Superintendent agreement. Tim Kuehl (né Timothy Gary Kuehl; born 1970) became superintendent July 1, 2021.

Both Districts are among Iowa's 104 public school districts (of 327) with enrollments of 500 or fewer, according to the Iowa Department of Education (December 2021) → EUCSD had 480 → MCSD had 269. Effective August 23, 2024, the Boards of both districts, EUCSD and MCSD, approved a four-day school week with the aim of, among other things, improving teacher recruitment and retention, allowing more time for curricular planning, and improving student attendance.

== Mascot ==
The school's mascot is the Mustang. Its colors are purple, gold, and white.

== Schools ==
The district operates two schools in a single facility at 216 Sherman Street in Murray:

- Murray Elementary School
- Murray High School

== Murray High School ==
=== Athletics ===
The Mustangs compete in the Bluegrass Conference, including the following sports:

- Volleyball
- Football (8-man)
- Basketball (boys and girls)
- Wrestling (as East Union-Murray)
- Track and Field (boys and girls)
- Golf (girls, as East Union-Murray)
- Baseball
- Softball

== See also ==
- List of school districts in Iowa
- List of high schools in Iowa

== Bibliography ==
=== References ===
- "Bluegrass Conference". Bluegrass Conference..
- Creston News Advertiser: "Murray Schedules 4-Day School Week". Creston, Iowa: Shaw Media. March 31, 2023.. OCLC 1097114012 (all editions).
- "District Detail for Murray Community School District". National Center for Education Statistics. Institute of Education Sciences. NCES District ID: 1920100..
- "Iowa Department of Education School District Boundary Verification, 2022–2023 – Murray". Iowa Department of Education..
- Mensching, Leah McBride (née Leah Renee McBride; born 1981; married to Ryan Christopher Mensching) (April 2, 2022). Muller, Lyle Edward (born 1953) (ed.). "List of Iowa Districts With 500 or Fewer Students". Iowa City: The Iowa Center for Public Affairs Journalism–IowaWatch.org. Distributed by Newstex, LLC – via Investigate Midwest. ProQuest 2646000736 (US Newsstream database); OCLC 1329894847; OCLC 1035079117 (all editions).
