= South Central Communications (telecommunications) =

SCC Networks
- Company type: Subsidiary of GRM Networks
- Industry: Telecommunications
- Founded: 1996
- Headquarters: Princeton, Missouri, United States
- Products: Local Telephone Service
- Website: www.grm.net

South Central Communications, Inc. d/b/a SCC Networks is a company owned by GRM Networks that provides local telephone service to communities in Iowa, including Murray, Lorimor, and Corydon.

The company's name refers to its location in south central Iowa.

The company was established in 1996 and was incorporated in Missouri. However, its operations are all located in Iowa.
