= Senator Stiles =

Senator Stiles may refer to:

- Edward H. Stiles (1836–1921), Iowa State Senate
- Nancy Stiles (fl. 2010s), New Hampshire State Senate
