= Kent, Iowa =

- Census-designated place
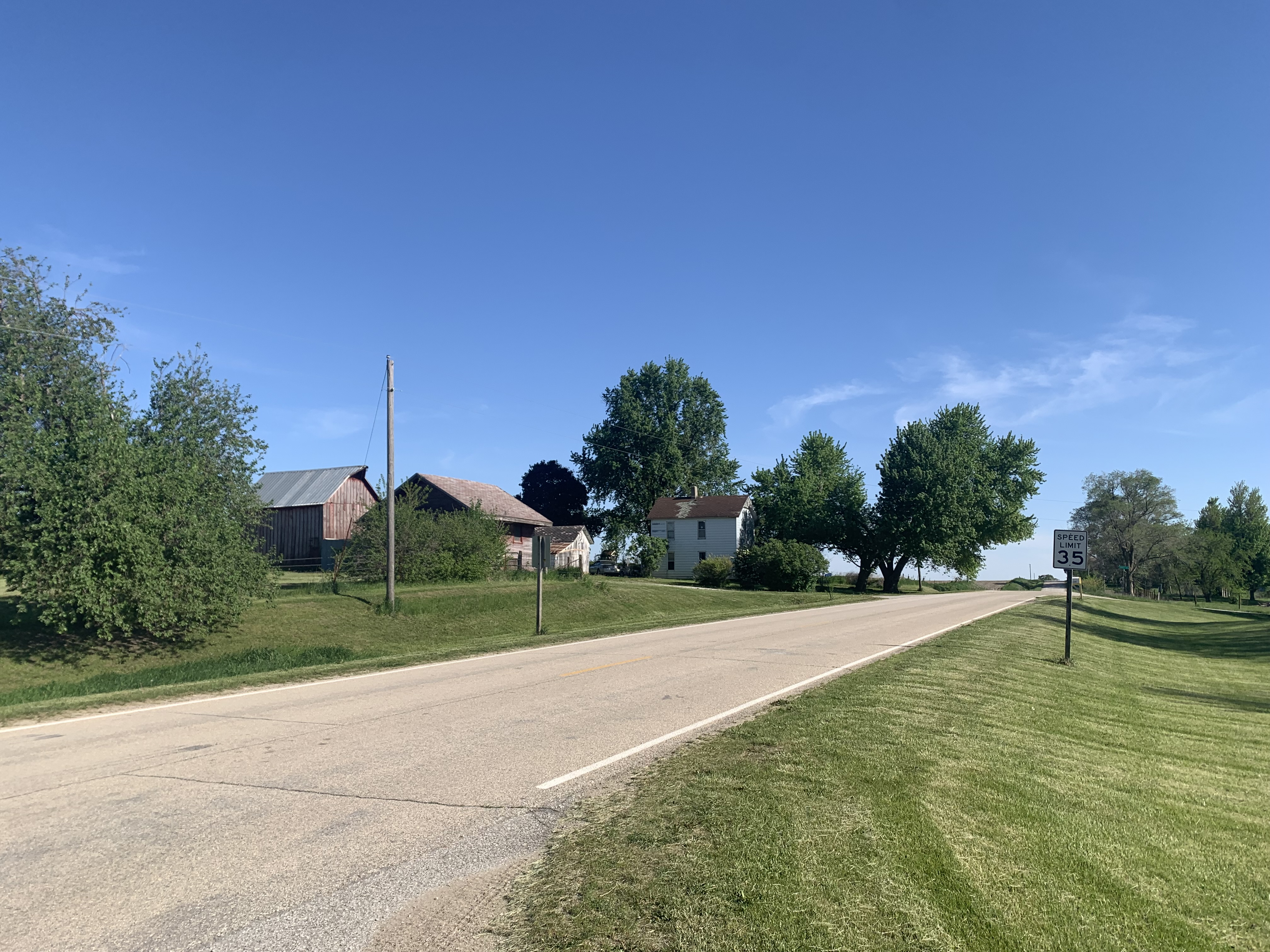
- Street in Kent

- Location of Kent, Iowa
- Coordinates: 40°57′13″N 94°27′40″W
- Country: USA
- State: Iowa
- County: Union

Area
  - Total: 0.49 sq mi (1.27 km^{2})
  - Land: 0.49 sq mi (1.27 km^{2})
  - Water: 0 sq mi (0.00 km^{2})
- Elevation: 1,234 ft (376 m)

Population (2020)
  - Total: 37
  - Density: 75.6/sq mi (29.19/km^{2})
- Time zone: UTC-6 (Central (CST))
  - Summer (DST): UTC-5 (CDT)
- FIPS code: 19-40710
- GNIS feature ID: 2583484

Kent is a census-designated place (CDP) in Union County, Iowa, United States. The population was 52 at the 2000 census. In 2003, after years of rural flight, the depopulated city was disincorporated, ending its existence as a self-governing community within the county. As of the 2010 census, Kent had become defined by the United States Census Bureau as a census-designated place, for data organization purposes, with an overall population of 61. By the time of the 2020 census, the population had dropped to 37.

== Geography ==
According to the 2010 census, the CDP has a total area of 0.49 square miles (1.3 km^{2}), all land. Hamlet-specific geographic data was not provided.

== Demographics ==
Historical population
Census	Pop.	Note	%±
1910	158		—
1920	183		15.8%
1930	177		−3.3%
1940	138		−22.0%
1950	169		22.5%
1960	94		−44.4%
1970	86		−8.5%
1980	70		−18.6%
1990	65		−7.1%
2000	52		−20.0%
2010	61		17.3%
2020	37		−39.3%
U.S. Decennial Census

=== 2020 census ===
As of the census of 2020, there were 37 people, 13 households, and 6 families residing in the community. The population density was 75.6 inhabitants per square mile (29.2/km^{2}). There were 18 housing units at an average density of 36.8 per square mile (14.2/km^{2}). The racial makeup of the community was 100.0% White, 0.0% Black or African American, 0.0% Native American, 0.0% Asian, 0.0% Pacific Islander, 0.0% from other races and 0.0% from two or more races. Hispanic or Latino persons of any race comprised 0.0% of the population.

Of the 13 households, 23.1% of which had children under the age of 18 living with them, 46.2% were married couples living together, 15.4% were cohabitating couples, 15.4% had a female householder with no spouse or partner present and 23.1% had a male householder with no spouse or partner present. 53.8% of all households were non-families. 38.5% of all households were made up of individuals, 15.4% had someone living alone who was 65 years old or older.

The median age in the community was 47.9 years. 29.7% of the residents were under the age of 20; 0.0% were between the ages of 20 and 24; 8.1% were from 25 and 44; 48.6% were from 45 and 64; and 13.5% were 65 years of age or older. The gender makeup of the community was 54.1% male and 45.9% female.

=== 2000 census ===
As of the census of 2000, there were 52 people, 23 households, and 14 families residing in the city. The population density was 201.1 inhabitants per square mile (77.6/km^{2}). There were 27 housing units at an average density of 104.4 per square mile (40.3/km^{2}). The racial makeup of the city was 100.00% White.

There were 23 households, out of which 21.7% had children under the age of 18 living with them, 47.8% were married couples living together, and 39.1% were non-families. 30.4% of all households were made up of individuals, and 8.7% had someone living alone who was 65 years of age or older. The average household size was 2.26 and the average family size was 2.64.

In the city the population was spread out, with 17.3% under the age of 18, 9.6% from 18 to 24, 32.7% from 25 to 44, 28.8% from 45 to 64, and 11.5% who were 65 years of age or older. The median age was 42 years. For every 100 females, there were 116.7 males. For every 100 females age 18 and over, there were 126.3 males.

The median income for a household in the city was $27,917, and the median income for a family was $22,188. Males had a median income of $23,125 versus $26,250 for females. The per capita income for the city was $13,529. There were 18.2% of families and 17.1% of the population living below the poverty line, including no under eighteens and none of those over 64.

== See also ==
- List of Discontinued cities in Iowa
