= Cromwell, Iowa =

- City
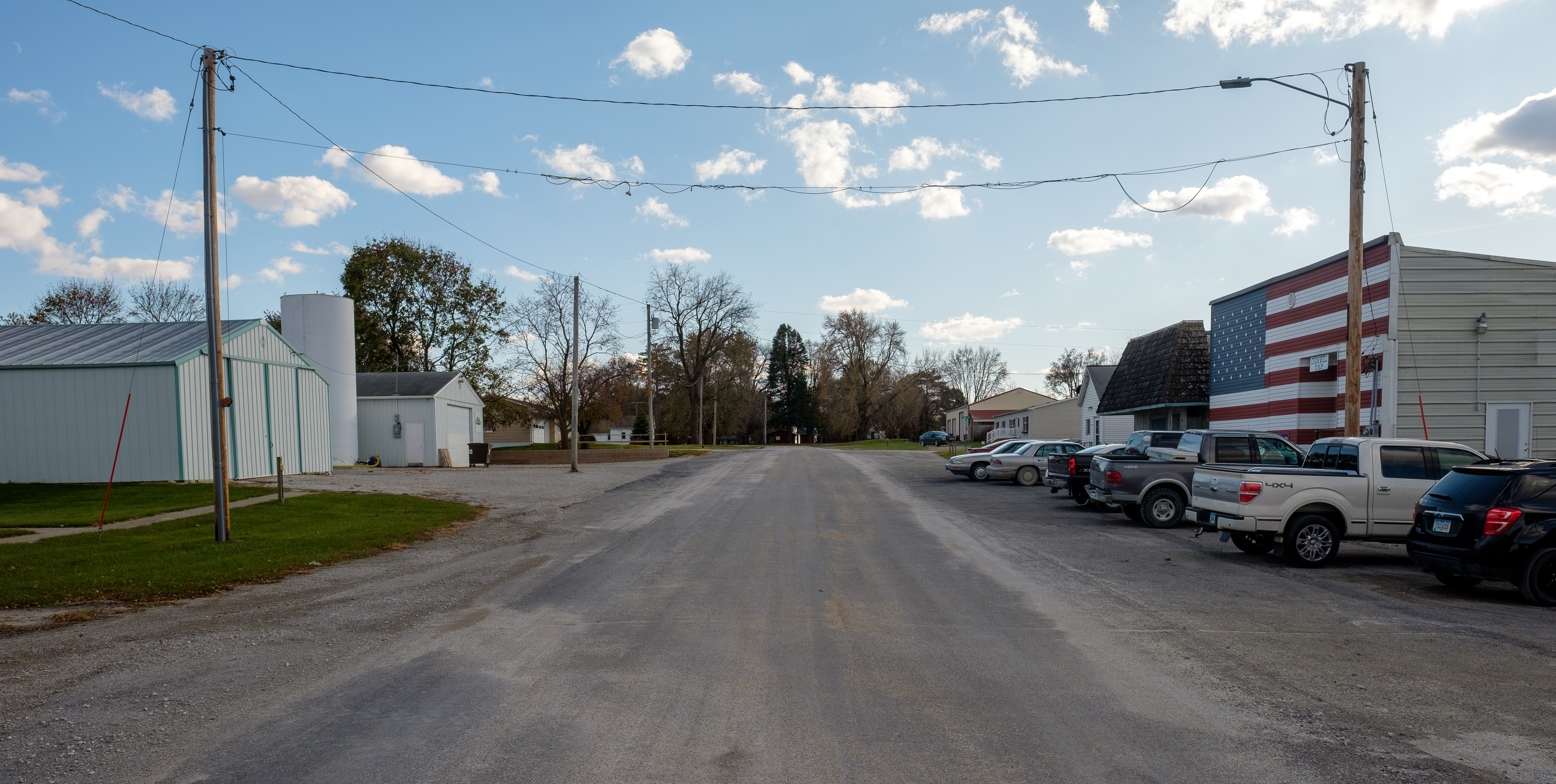
- Broadway Avenue

- Location of Cromwell, Iowa
- Coordinates: 41°02′26″N 94°27′42″W
- Country: USA
- State: Iowa
- County: Union

Area
  - Total: 0.30 sq mi (0.77 km^{2})
  - Land: 0.30 sq mi (0.77 km^{2})
  - Water: 0 sq mi (0.00 km^{2})
- Elevation: 1,280 ft (390 m)

Population (2020)
  - Total: 105
  - Density: 351.7/sq mi (135.81/km^{2})
- Time zone: UTC-6 (Central (CST))
  - Summer (DST): UTC-5 (CDT)
- ZIP code: 50842
- Area code: 641
- FIPS code: 19-17490
- GNIS feature ID: 2393677

Cromwell is a city in Union County, Iowa, United States. The population was 105 at the 2020 census.

== Geography ==
According to the United States Census Bureau, the city has a total area of 0.29 square miles (0.75 km^{2}), all land.

== Demographics ==
Historical populations
Year	Pop.	±%
1880	189	—
1900	208	+10.1%
1910	208	+0.0%
1920	143	−31.2%
1930	173	+21.0%
1940	165	−4.6%
1950	147	−10.9%
1960	138	−6.1%
1970	168	+21.7%
1980	157	−6.5%
1990	120	−23.6%
2000	120	+0.0%
2010	107	−10.8%
2020	105	−1.9%
Source:"U.S. Census website". United States Census Bureau. and Iowa Data Center; Source: U.S. Decennial Census

=== 2020 census ===
As of the census of 2020, there were 105 people, 49 households, and 38 families residing in the city. The population density was 351.7 inhabitants per square mile (135.8/km^{2}). There were 52 housing units at an average density of 174.2 per square mile (67.3/km^{2}). The racial makeup of the city was 95.2% White, 0.0% Black or African American, 0.0% Native American, 1.0% Asian, 0.0% Pacific Islander, 0.0% from other races and 3.8% from two or more races. Hispanic or Latino persons of any race comprised 1.9% of the population.

Of the 49 households, 28.6% of which had children under the age of 18 living with them, 57.1% were married couples living together, 8.2% were cohabitating couples, 16.3% had a female householder with no spouse or partner present and 18.4% had a male householder with no spouse or partner present. 22.4% of all households were non-families. 18.4% of all households were made up of individuals, 10.2% had someone living alone who was 65 years old or older.

The median age in the city was 47.3 years. 21.9% of the residents were under the age of 20; 1.9% were between the ages of 20 and 24; 21.9% were from 25 and 44; 30.5% were from 45 and 64; and 23.8% were 65 years of age or older. The gender makeup of the city was 53.3% male and 46.7% female.

=== 2010 census ===
As of the census of 2010, there were 107 people, 42 households, and 29 families residing in the city. The population density was 369.0 inhabitants per square mile (142.5/km^{2}). There were 48 housing units at an average density of 165.5 per square mile (63.9/km^{2}). The racial makeup of the city was 100.0% White.

There were 42 households, of which 35.7% had children under the age of 18 living with them, 59.5% were married couples living together, 2.4% had a female householder with no husband present, 7.1% had a male householder with no wife present, and 31.0% were non-families. 23.8% of all households were made up of individuals, and 9.5% had someone living alone who was 65 years of age or older. The average household size was 2.55 and the average family size was 2.97.

The median age in the city was 39.1 years. 22.4% of residents were under the age of 18; 11.1% were between the ages of 18 and 24; 27.1% were from 25 to 44; 26.2% were from 45 to 64; and 13.1% were 65 years of age or older. The gender makeup of the city was 55.1% male and 44.9% female.

=== 2000 census ===
As of the census of 2000, there were 120 people, 47 households, and 31 families residing in the city. The population density was 416.6 inhabitants per square mile (160.9/km^{2}). There were 50 housing units at an average density of 173.6 per square mile (67.0/km^{2}). The racial makeup of the city was 99.17% White, and 0.83% from two or more races. Hispanic or Latino of any race were 0.83% of the population.

There were 47 households, out of which 31.9% had children under the age of 18 living with them, 59.6% were married couples living together, 2.1% had a female householder with no husband present, and 34.0% were non-families. 34.0% of all households were made up of individuals, and 8.5% had someone living alone who was 65 years of age or older. The average household size was 2.55 and the average family size was 3.32.

In the city, the population was spread out, with 30.0% under the age of 18, 5.8% from 18 to 24, 26.7% from 25 to 44, 30.0% from 45 to 64, and 7.5% who were 65 years of age or older. The median age was 37 years. For every 100 females, there were 106.9 males. For every 100 females age 18 and over, there were 100.0 males.

The median income for a household in the city was $35,000, and the median income for a family was $36,750. Males had a median income of $24,375 versus $26,250 for females. The per capita income for the city was $12,190. There were 27.0% of families and 42.9% of the population living below the poverty line, including 56.8% of under eighteens and 23.8% of those over 64.
