= Grand River Bridge (Arispe, Iowa) =

- U.S. National Register of Historic Places
- Location within Iowa Location within the United States
- Location: 230th St. over the Grand River
- Nearest city: Arispe, Iowa
- Coordinates: 40°57′48″N 94°02′20″W
- Area: less than one acre
- Built: 1885
- Built by: King Iron Bridge Co.
- Architectural style: Pratt through truss
- MPS: Highway Bridges of Iowa MPS
- NRHP reference No.: 98000479
- Added to NRHP: May 15, 1998

The Grand River Bridge is a historic structure located east of Arispe, Iowa, United States. It is a 5-panel, 156-foot (48 m), single span, Pratt through truss over the Grand River. The bridge was built in 1885 by the King Iron Bridge Co. of Cleveland, Ohio. It was listed on the National Register of Historic Places in 1998.
