= Highland Township, Union County, Iowa =

Township in Iowa, U.S.

Coordinates: 41°01′35″N 94°17′51″W

Highland Township is a township in Union County, Iowa, United States.
