= Grand River Mutual Telephone =

Grand River Mutual Telephone Corporation
- Company type: Member Owned Cooperative
- Industry: Telecommunications
- Founded: 1951; 75 years ago
- Headquarters: Princeton, MO, United States
- Area served: Iowa and Missouri
- Products: Local Telephone Service
- Subsidiaries: SCC Networks
- Website: www.grm.net

Grand River Mutual Telephone Corporation, doing business as GRM Networks, is a telephone company providing local telephone service in Iowa and Missouri, USA.

Former Grand River Mutual Telephone logo

The cities served by the company in Iowa include Lamoni and Leon, and cities served in Missouri include Bethany, Conception Junction, and Mercer.

The company owns two smaller telephone companies: Lathrop Telephone Company d/b/a LTC Networks in Missouri and South Central Communications d/b/a SCC Networks in Iowa.
