= Grant Township, Union County, Iowa =

Township in Iowa, U.S.

Coordinates: 40°56′30″N 94°17′59″W

Grant Township is a township in Union County, Iowa, United States.
