= Union Township, Union County, Iowa =

Township in Iowa, U.S.

Coordinates: 41°01′38″N 94°11′08″W

Union Township is a township in Union County, Iowa, United States.
