= Sand Creek Township, Union County, Iowa =

Township in Iowa, U.S.

Coordinates: 40°56′27″N 94°11′08″W

Sand Creek Township is a township in Union County, Iowa, United States.
