= Douglas Township, Union County, Iowa =

Township in Iowa, U.S.

Coordinates: 41°01′32″N 94°25′04″W

Douglas Township is a township in Union County, Iowa, United States.
