= Platte Township, Union County, Iowa =

Township in Iowa, U.S.

Coordinates: 40°56′32″N 94°24′50″W

Platte Township is a township in Union County, Iowa, United States.
