= Union County, Iowa =

County in Iowa, United States

- County
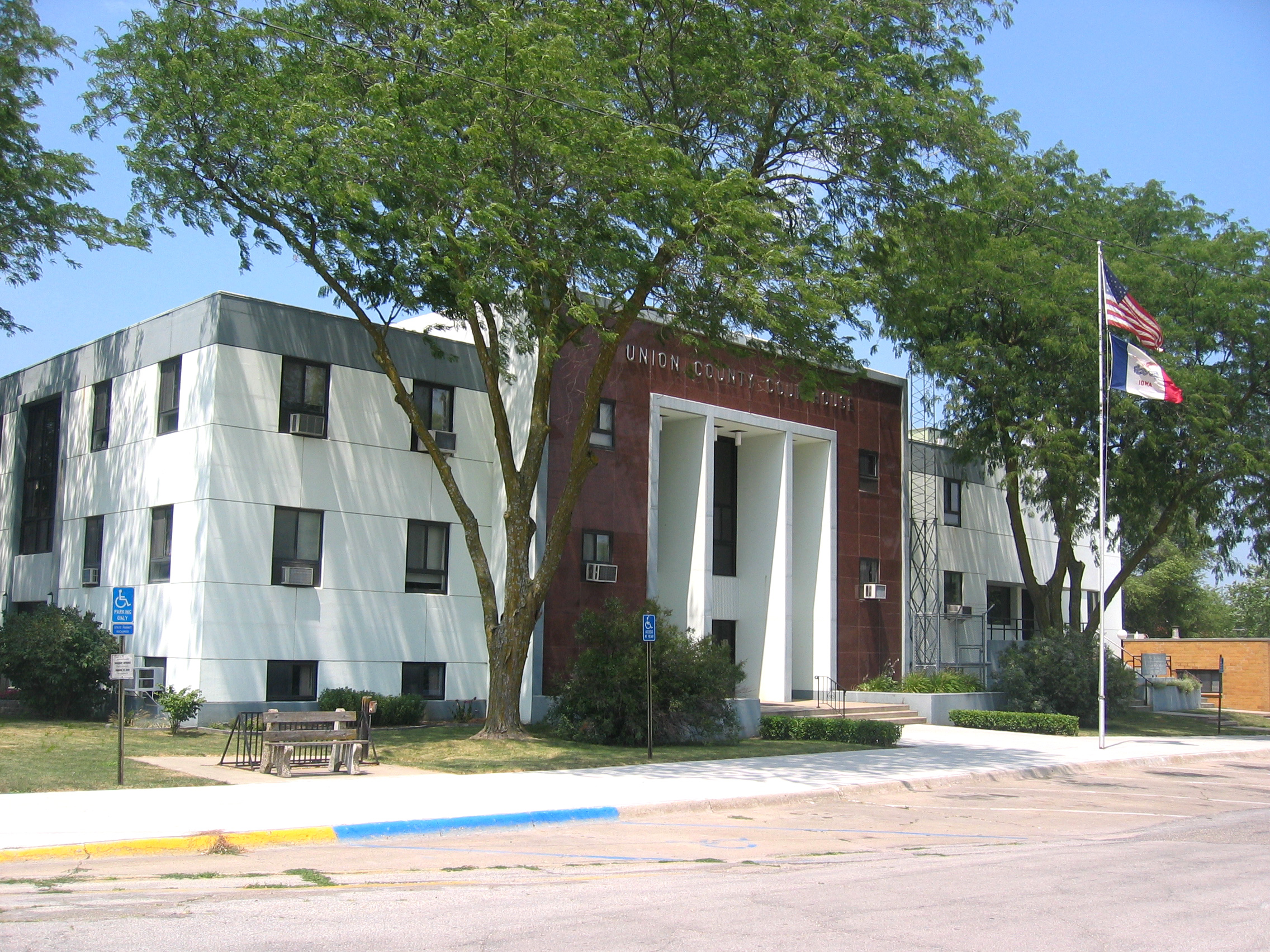
- The Union County Courthouse in Creston

- Location within the U.S. state of Iowa
- Coordinates: 41°01′33″N 94°14′29″W
- Country: United States
- State: Iowa
- Founded: January 15, 1851
- Seat: Creston
- Largest city: Creston

Area
  - Total: 426 sq mi (1,100 km^{2})
  - Land: 424 sq mi (1,100 km^{2})
  - Water: 2.2 sq mi (5.7 km^{2}) 0.5%

Population (2020)
  - Total: 12,138
  - Estimate (2025): 11,829 ▼
  - Density: 28.6/sq mi (11.1/km^{2})
- Time zone: UTC−6 (Central)
  - Summer (DST): UTC−5 (CDT)
- Congressional district: 3rd
- Website: unioncountyiowa.gov
- Iowa county number 88

Union County is a county located in the southern part of the U.S. state of Iowa. As of the 2020 Census, the population was 12,138. The county seat is Creston. Organized at a time of tensions before the Civil War, the county was named in 1853 for the union that people wanted to preserve. Union County peaked in population at the 1900 Census. Its economy is based on agriculture and related industries.As of September 2026 Union County ranks #97 of 99 Iowa counties in per capita income at $31697 and 98th in median family income at $57772,placing it very near the poorest county in Iowa.

== History ==
The first permanent European-American settlers came in 1849 and 1850. Mormons had earlier established Mt. Pisgah in the eastern part of the county as a way station as they traveled west, but had left this area by 1848. Settlers used Pisgah as a base to establish farms along the Grand and Platte rivers that run through the county. They found a market for their produce with the emigrants traveling overland to California to take part in the Gold Rush. Travelers often sought shelter with the settlers along the way. In 1851, one settler counted 2,600 teams driven by emigrants to California; they often drove herds of sheep and cattle, trying to get animals to the gold fields to feed the miners, but many died along the way.

The first village was Petersville, founded in 1853, the same year that the county was organized. The county was named for the union which many people wanted to preserve, at a time of rising tensions between the North and the South.

After the American Civil War, railroad construction linked the areas of the county, giving rise to new towns, and gave access to other markets. In 1868 the railroad reached Afton, Iowa, and the next year Creston, the county seat, was made a division point. The railroad built service facilities there, a roundhouse and related structures. The railroad brought immigrants and migrants to the area, who were attracted to the fertile soil as farmland. Immigrants came from across central and eastern Europe, as well as from eastern states of the US. The Burlington Northern Santa Fe Railroad (BNSF) continues to be important in the area, serving as the chief network for hauling grain and coal. Over the years, it drew workers from industrial cities such as Chicago to Creston.

The county has a fair each year. In the late 19th century, southwestern Iowa claimed the title of Bluegrass Capital, having cultivated bluegrass throughout the area. In 1889 the Bluegrass Association was founded, made up of representatives of the 18 counties in this region. They built a Bluegrass Palace on the Union County Fairgrounds. It was designed by Louis Syberkro, an artist, and constructed by J. C. Woodruff, both of Creston. Made of sod and baled hay on a wood frame, the building was 100 feet square, with corner turrets and a central tower 92 feet high. It held exhibits of farm products and resource commodities from counties of the association, including wood, coal, sandstone, and marble. The palace was such a success that the Bluegrass Association commissioned a larger one the following year, which supplied about three times as much space. In a separate wing was an auditorium large enough to hold 2,000 people.

== Geography ==
According to the United States Census Bureau, the county has a total area of 426 square miles (1,100 km^{2}), of which 424 square miles (1,100 km^{2}) is land and 2.2 square miles (5.7 km^{2}) (0.5%) is water.

=== Major highways ===
- U.S. Highway 34
- U.S. Highway 169
- Iowa Highway 25

=== Adjacent counties ===
- Adair County (northwest)
- Madison County (northeast)
- Clarke County (east)
- Ringgold County (south)
- Adams County (west)

== Demographics ==
Historical population
| Census | Pop. | Note | %± |
|---|---|---|---|
| 1860 | 2,012 | | — |
| 1870 | 5,986 | | 197.5% |
| 1880 | 14,980 | | 150.3% |
| 1890 | 16,900 | | 12.8% |
| 1900 | 19,928 | | 17.9% |
| 1910 | 16,616 | | −16.6% |
| 1920 | 17,268 | | 3.9% |
| 1930 | 17,435 | | 1.0% |
| 1940 | 16,280 | | −6.6% |
| 1950 | 15,651 | | −3.9% |
| 1960 | 13,712 | | −12.4% |
| 1970 | 13,557 | | −1.1% |
| 1980 | 13,858 | | 2.2% |
| 1990 | 12,750 | | −8.0% |
| 2000 | 12,309 | | −3.5% |
| 2010 | 12,534 | | 1.8% |
| 2020 | 12,138 | | −3.2% |
| 2025 (est.) | 11,829 | ▼ | −2.5% |
U.S. Decennial Census; 1790–1960 1900–1990; 1990–2000 2010–2020

=== 2020 census ===
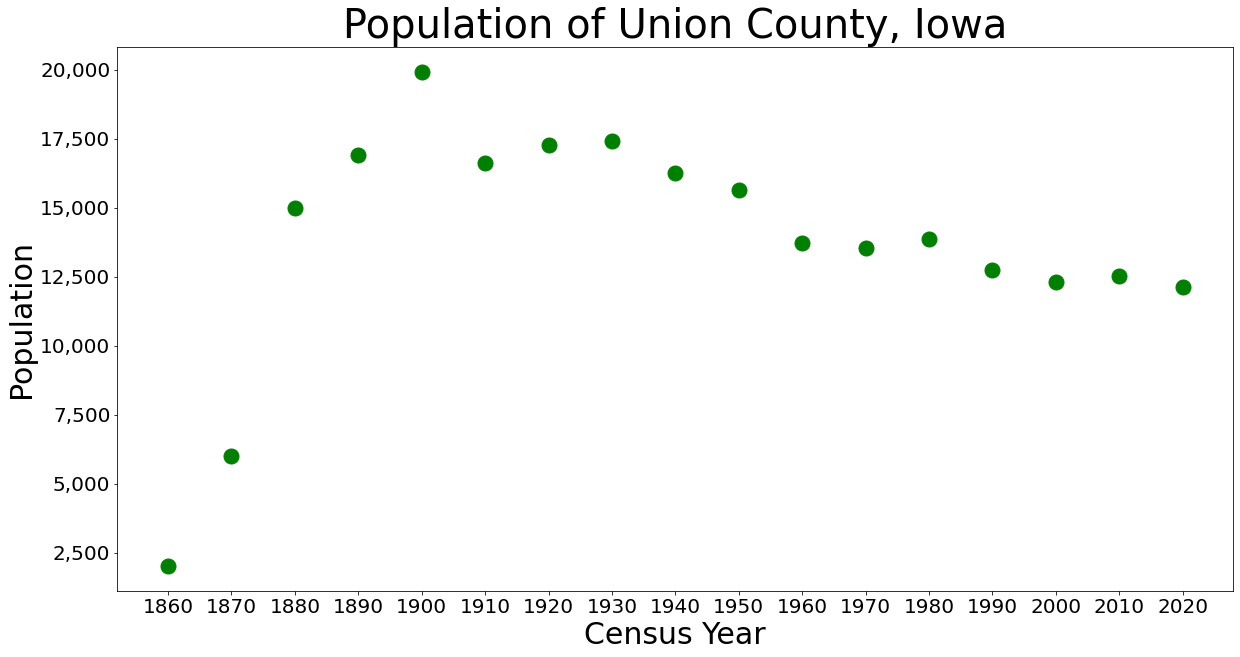
Population of Union County from the U.S. census data

As of the 2020 census, the county had a population of 12,138 and a population density of 28.6/sq mi (11.0/km^{2}). There were 5,784 housing units, of which 5,169 were occupied.

The 2020 census reported a median age of 40.9 years, with 22.9% of residents under the age of 18 and 21.1% aged 65 or older. For every 100 females there were 97.2 males, and for every 100 females age 18 and over there were 95.3 males. There were 5,169 households, of which 26.2% had children under the age of 18 living in them. Of all households, 45.3% were married-couple households, 20.9% were households with a male householder and no spouse or partner present, and 26.1% were households with a female householder and no spouse or partner present. About 33.3% of all households were made up of individuals and 15.3% had someone living alone who was 65 years of age or older.

96.37% of residents reported being of one race. The racial makeup of the county was 93.6% White, 1.0% Black or African American, 0.3% American Indian and Alaska Native, 0.5% Asian, 0.1% Native Hawaiian and Pacific Islander, 0.9% from some other race, and 3.6% from two or more races. Hispanic or Latino residents of any race comprised 3.3% of the population.

61.8% of residents lived in urban areas, while 38.2% lived in rural areas.

=== 2010 census ===
The 2010 census recorded a population of 12,534 in the county, with a population density of 29.5/sq mi (11.4/km^{2}). There were 5,937 housing units, of which 5,271 were occupied.

=== 2000 census ===
As of the 2000 census, there were 12,309 people, 5,242 households, and 3,354 families residing in the county. The population density was 29 people per square mile (11 people/km^{2}). There were 5,657 housing units at an average density of 13 units per square mile (5.0 units/km^{2}). The racial makeup of the county was 98.44% White, 0.23% Black or African American, 0.17% Native American, 0.25% Asian, 0.32% from other races, and 0.58% from two or more races. 1.02% of the population were Hispanic or Latino of any race.

There were 5,242 households, out of which 27.50% had children under the age of 18 living with them, 53.10% were married couples living together, 8.00% had a female householder with no husband present, and 36.00% were non-families. 31.30% of all households were made up of individuals, and 14.40% had someone living alone who was 65 years of age or older. The average household size was 2.29 and the average family size was 2.87.

In the county, the population was spread out, with 23.30% under the age of 18, 8.70% from 18 to 24, 25.30% from 25 to 44, 24.00% from 45 to 64, and 18.70% who were 65 years of age or older. The median age was 40 years. For every 100 females there were 92.10 males. For every 100 females age 18 and over, there were 89.00 males.

The median income for a household in the county was $31,905, and the median income for a family was $41,453. Males had a median income of $27,700 versus $20,760 for females. The per capita income for the county was $16,690. About 7.40% of families and 11.40% of the population were below the poverty line, including 13.80% of those under age 18 and 9.30% of those age 65 or over.

== Communities ==
=== Cities ===
- Afton
- Arispe
- Creston
- Cromwell
- Lorimor
- Shannon City
- Thayer

=== Unincorporated communities ===
- Talmage

=== Townships ===
- Dodge
- Douglas
- Grant
- Highland
- Jones
- Lincoln
- New Hope
- Platte
- Pleasant
- Sand Creek
- Spaulding
- Union

=== Census-designated place ===
- Kent

=== Population ranking ===
The population ranking of the following table is based on the 2020 census of Union County.

† county seat

| Rank | City/Town/etc. | Municipal type | Population (2020 Census) |
|---|---|---|---|
| 1 | † Creston | City | 7,536 |
| 2 | Afton | City | 874 |
| 3 | Lorimor | City | 386 |
| 4 | Cromwell | City | 105 |
| 5 | Arispe | City | 96 |
| 6 | Shannon City (partially in Ringgold County) | City | 67 (73 total) |
| 7 | Thayer | City | 51 |
| 8 | Kent | CDP | 37 |

== Politics ==
Union County was a bellwether county from 1952 to 2016, backing the nationwide winner in every election in that span except for 1960 and 1988. The county is now safely Republican, as Donald Trump won it in 2020 with nearly 65% of the vote and a margin of victory of nearly 32%, turning in the best performance and margin of victory for a candidate of any party since Dwight D. Eisenhower won the county in 1952 during his nationwide landslide.

United States presidential election results for Union County, Iowa
| Year | Republican | | Democratic | | Third party(ies) | |
| Year | No. | % | No. | % | No. | % |
|---|---|---|---|---|---|---|
| 1896 | 2,196 | 46.83% | 2,425 | 51.72% | 68 | 1.45% |
| 1900 | 2,462 | 50.86% | 2,218 | 45.82% | 161 | 3.33% |
| 1904 | 2,674 | 62.16% | 1,322 | 30.73% | 306 | 7.11% |
| 1908 | 2,207 | 52.36% | 1,843 | 43.72% | 165 | 3.91% |
| 1912 | 1,096 | 28.15% | 1,528 | 39.25% | 1,269 | 32.60% |
| 1916 | 2,050 | 49.95% | 1,985 | 48.37% | 69 | 1.68% |
| 1920 | 4,466 | 65.63% | 2,228 | 32.74% | 111 | 1.63% |
| 1924 | 4,250 | 54.15% | 1,166 | 14.86% | 2,432 | 30.99% |
| 1928 | 5,432 | 66.71% | 2,651 | 32.56% | 60 | 0.74% |
| 1932 | 3,043 | 42.96% | 3,967 | 56.01% | 73 | 1.03% |
| 1936 | 4,647 | 53.42% | 3,938 | 45.27% | 114 | 1.31% |
| 1940 | 5,421 | 62.54% | 3,229 | 37.25% | 18 | 0.21% |
| 1944 | 4,566 | 61.29% | 2,861 | 38.40% | 23 | 0.31% |
| 1948 | 4,138 | 55.81% | 3,218 | 43.40% | 58 | 0.78% |
| 1952 | 5,742 | 68.92% | 2,566 | 30.80% | 24 | 0.29% |
| 1956 | 4,666 | 62.21% | 2,828 | 37.70% | 7 | 0.09% |
| 1960 | 4,417 | 61.85% | 2,720 | 38.08% | 5 | 0.07% |
| 1964 | 2,502 | 39.95% | 3,751 | 59.89% | 10 | 0.16% |
| 1968 | 3,365 | 57.05% | 2,137 | 36.23% | 396 | 6.71% |
| 1972 | 3,734 | 62.47% | 2,112 | 35.34% | 131 | 2.19% |
| 1976 | 2,873 | 48.30% | 2,955 | 49.68% | 120 | 2.02% |
| 1980 | 3,372 | 56.40% | 2,182 | 36.49% | 425 | 7.11% |
| 1984 | 3,583 | 54.49% | 2,875 | 43.72% | 118 | 1.79% |
| 1988 | 2,751 | 45.54% | 3,236 | 53.57% | 54 | 0.89% |
| 1992 | 2,224 | 36.45% | 2,565 | 42.04% | 1,313 | 21.52% |
| 1996 | 2,156 | 38.11% | 2,787 | 49.27% | 714 | 12.62% |
| 2000 | 3,003 | 52.32% | 2,540 | 44.25% | 197 | 3.43% |
| 2004 | 3,165 | 52.94% | 2,747 | 45.95% | 66 | 1.10% |
| 2008 | 2,781 | 47.02% | 3,000 | 50.73% | 133 | 2.25% |
| 2012 | 2,813 | 47.22% | 3,043 | 51.08% | 101 | 1.70% |
| 2016 | 3,525 | 60.44% | 1,922 | 32.96% | 385 | 6.60% |
| 2020 | 4,010 | 64.83% | 2,061 | 33.32% | 114 | 1.84% |
| 2024 | 4,044 | 67.25% | 1,874 | 31.17% | 95 | 1.58% |

== Education ==
School districts include:

- Creston Community School District
- East Union Community School District
- Lenox Community School District
- Murray Community School District

Former districts

- Orient-Macksburg Community School District - Dissolved on July 1, 2026.

== See also ==
- National Register of Historic Places listings in Union County, Iowa
