= Shannon City, Iowa =

City in Union County, Iowa, U.S.

- City
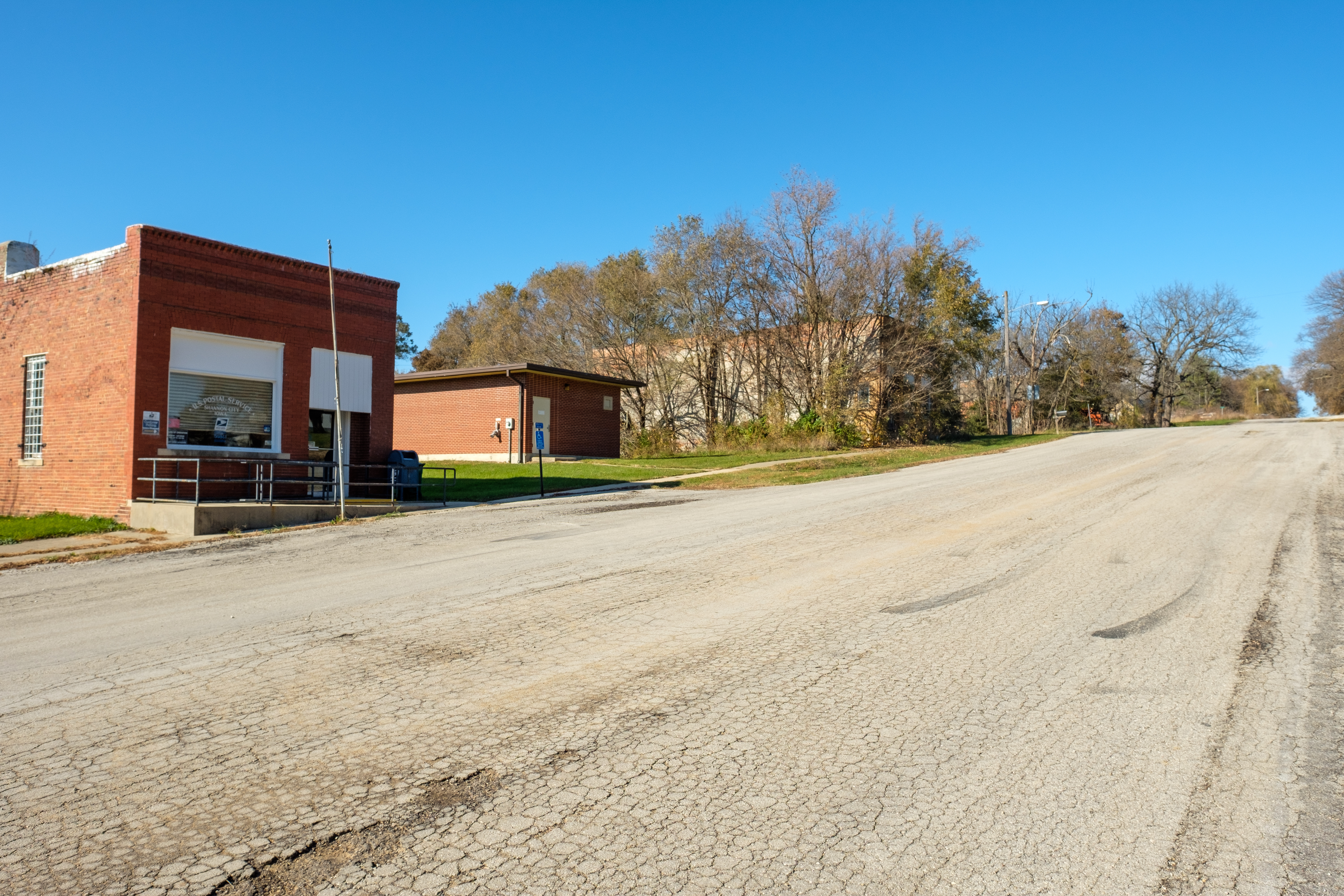
- Main Street

- Location of Shannon City, Iowa
- Coordinates: 40°53′57″N 94°15′49″W
- Country: USA
- State: Iowa
- Counties: Union, Ringgold

Area
  - Total: 0.44 sq mi (1.13 km^{2})
  - Land: 0.44 sq mi (1.13 km^{2})
  - Water: 0.0039 sq mi (0.01 km^{2})
- Elevation: 1,175 ft (358 m)

Population (2020)
  - Total: 73
  - Density: 167.8/sq mi (64.78/km^{2})
- Time zone: UTC-6 (Central (CST))
  - Summer (DST): UTC-5 (CDT)
- ZIP code: 50861
- Area code: 641
- FIPS code: 19-71940
- GNIS feature ID: 2395856

Shannon City is a city in southern Union and northern Ringgold counties in the U.S. state of Iowa. The population was 73 at the time of the 2020 census.

== Geography ==
Shannon City is two miles west of US Route 169 along the Union-Ringgold County line. The Grand River flows past the southeast side of the community.

According to the United States Census Bureau, the city has a total area of 0.41 square miles (1.06 km^{2}), all land.

== Demographics ==
Historical populations
Year	Pop.	±%
1900	380	—
1910	292	−23.2%
1920	333	+14.0%
1930	293	−12.0%
1940	288	−1.7%
1950	171	−40.6%
1960	127	−25.7%
1970	100	−21.3%
1980	93	−7.0%
1990	97	+4.3%
2000	70	−27.8%
2010	71	+1.4%
2020	73	+2.8%
Source:"U.S. Census website". United States Census Bureau. and Iowa Data Center; Source: U.S. Decennial Census

=== 2020 census ===
As of the census of 2020, there were 73 people, 29 households, and 19 families residing in the city. The population density was 167.8 inhabitants per square mile (64.8/km^{2}). There were 37 housing units at an average density of 85.0 per square mile (32.8/km^{2}). The racial makeup of the city was 91.8% White, 0.0% Black or African American, 0.0% Native American, 0.0% Asian, 0.0% Pacific Islander, 0.0% from other races and 8.2% from two or more races. Hispanic or Latino persons of any race comprised 9.6% of the population.

Of the 29 households, 41.4% of which had children under the age of 18 living with them, 44.8% were married couples living together, 13.8% were cohabitating couples, 10.3% had a female householder with no spouse or partner present and 31.0% had a male householder with no spouse or partner present. 34.5% of all households were non-families. 20.7% of all households were made up of individuals, 10.3% had someone living alone who was 65 years old or older.

The median age in the city was 47.2 years. 19.2% of the residents were under the age of 20; 9.6% were between the ages of 20 and 24; 16.4% were from 25 and 44; 39.7% were from 45 and 64; and 15.1% were 65 years of age or older. The gender makeup of the city was 53.4% male and 46.6% female.

=== 2010 census ===
As of the census of 2010, there were 71 people, 35 households, and 19 families living in the city. The population density was 173.2 inhabitants per square mile (66.9/km^{2}). There were 41 housing units at an average density of 100.0 per square mile (38.6/km^{2}). The racial makeup of the city was 98.6% White and 1.4% from two or more races. Hispanic or Latino of any race were 1.4% of the population.

There were 35 households, of which 22.9% had children under the age of 18 living with them, 31.4% were married couples living together, 5.7% had a female householder with no husband present, 17.1% had a male householder with no wife present, and 45.7% were non-families. 40.0% of all households were made up of individuals, and 20% had someone living alone who was 65 years of age or older. The average household size was 2.03 and the average family size was 2.58.

The median age in the city was 44.3 years. 22.5% of residents were under the age of 18; 2.8% were between the ages of 18 and 24; 26.7% were from 25 to 44; 29.6% were from 45 to 64; and 18.3% were 65 years of age or older. The gender makeup of the city was 59.2% male and 40.8% female.

=== 2000 census ===
As of the census of 2000, there were 70 people, 34 households, and 19 families living in the city. The population density was 470.6 inhabitants per square mile (181.7/km^{2}). There were 40 housing units at an average density of 268.9 per square mile (103.8/km^{2}). The racial makeup of the city was 97.14% White, 1.43% from other races, and 1.43% from two or more races.

There were 34 households, out of which 26.5% had children under the age of 18 living with them, 38.2% were married couples living together, 5.9% had a female householder with no husband present, and 44.1% were non-families. 38.2% of all households were made up of individuals, and 17.6% had someone living alone who was 65 years of age or older. The average household size was 2.06 and the average family size was 2.63.

In the city, the population was spread out, with 21.4% under the age of 18, 5.7% from 18 to 24, 34.3% from 25 to 44, 22.9% from 45 to 64, and 15.7% who were 65 years of age or older. The median age was 40 years. For every 100 females, there were 112.1 males. For every 100 females age 18 and over, there were 120.0 males.

The median income for a household in the city was $19,583, and the median income for a family was $23,750. Males had a median income of $19,063 versus $16,667 for females. The per capita income for the city was $10,554. There were 20.0% of families and 17.7% of the population living below the poverty line, including 12.0% of under eighteens and none of those over 64.

== Notable people ==
- Bonnie Leman, founder of Quilter's Newsletter Magazine, was a teacher in Shannon City for a brief period.
