= Jones Township, Union County, Iowa =

Township in Iowa, U.S.

Coordinates: 41°01′37″N 94°04′18″W

Jones Township is a township in Union County, Iowa, United States.
