= Edward H. Stiles =

American politician and lawyer (1836–1921)

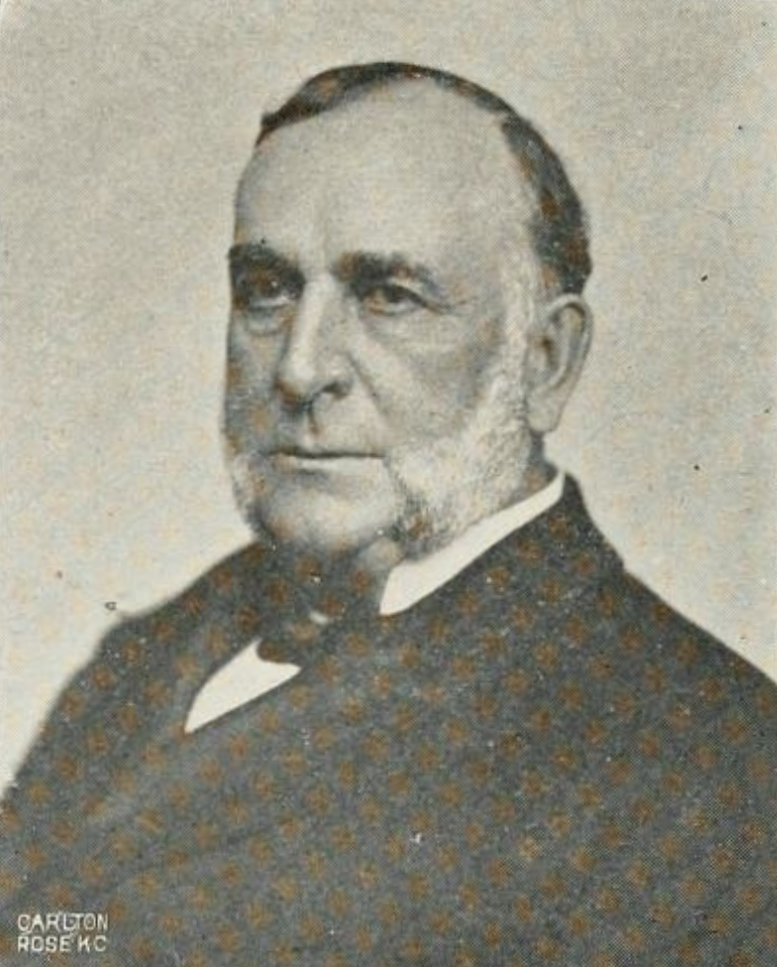
- Photo of Stiles (c. 1902)

Member of the Iowa Senate from the 12th district
- In office January 8, 1866 – January 12, 1868
- Preceded by: Jacob W. Dixon
- Succeeded by: Abial Richmond Pierce

Member of the Iowa House of Representatives from the 10th district
- In office January 11, 1864 – January 7, 1866

Personal details
- Born: Edward Holcomb Stiles; October 3, 1836 Granby, Connecticut, U.S.
- Died: May 9, 1921 (aged 84) Pasadena, California, U.S.
- Party: Democratic (before 1863); Republican (after 1863)
- Spouse: Emma M. Vernon (m. 1861; died 1911)
- Children: 6
- Occupation: Lawyer; politician; writer; judge
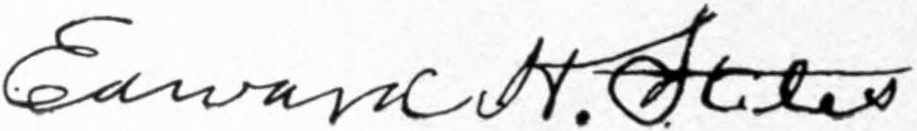
- Signature

Edward Holcomb Stiles (October 3, 1836 – May 9, 1921) was a lawyer, politician and writer. He served in the Iowa House of Representatives and Iowa Senate.

== Early life ==
Edward Holcomb Stiles was born on October 3, 1836, in Granby, Connecticut. In 1856, Stiles moved to Wapello County, Iowa, and taught school the following winter. He studied law with Colonel S. W. Summers of Ottumwa, Iowa, and was admitted to the bar in 1857.

== Career ==
Stiles formed a partnership with Summers. In 1858, Stiles was elected a member of the Ottumwa City Council and became city counselor in 1859. In 1860, Stiles was a Democrat. He stumped for Stephen A. Douglas in Iowa alongside Henry Clay Dean for the 1860 presidential election. After the Civil War, Stiles became a Republican. In 1861, Stiles became a county attorney.

In 1863, Stiles was elected as representative in the Iowa House of Representatives, representing District 10, for the 1864 session. In 1865, Stiles was elected to the Iowa Senate, serving in the 1866 session but ultimately resigned in 1866 after his nomination to the Republican State Convention as reporter for the Supreme Court. He was the first elected to the position of reporter of the Supreme Court. He served in the role until 1875. Stiles published with Thomas F. Withrow four volumes of Digest of Decisions of the Supreme Court of Iowa, a history of the Supreme Court from territorial days to the date of publication, from 1874 to 1879.

In 1883, Stiles ran as a Republican for the U.S. Congress, but lost to James B. Weaver. Stiles worked as a local attorney for Chicago, Burlington and Quincy Railroad and Chicago, Rock Island and Pacific Railroad for about twenty years. In 1886, Stiles moved to Kansas City, Missouri. He then worked as a law partner with ex-Governor Thomas T. Crittenden. He also practiced law with Judge H. C. McDougal. In 1892, Stiles was appointed as master in chancery for the United States District Court for the Western District of Missouri. In 1894, Stiles was appointed as special master of the Atchison, Topeka and Santa Fe Railway, St. Louis–San Francisco Railway and the Atlantic and Pacific Railroad. He retired in 1911 from practicing law and moved to Pasadena, California. Stiles prepared and published Recollections and Sketches of Notable Lawyers and Public Men of Early Iowa in 1916.

== Personal life ==
Stiles married Emma M. Vernon of Chester County, Pennsylvania, on September 19, 1861. They had six children, including Vernon, Edward, Mrs. Egbert J. Gates and Bertha V. His daughter married California state senator Egbert J. Gates. His wife died in 1911.

Later in life, Stiles lived at 904 Mission Street in Pasadena. Stiles died at the home of his son-in-law Egbert J. Gates on May 9, 1921, in Pasadena, California.
