= Afton, Iowa =

City in Iowa, United States

- City
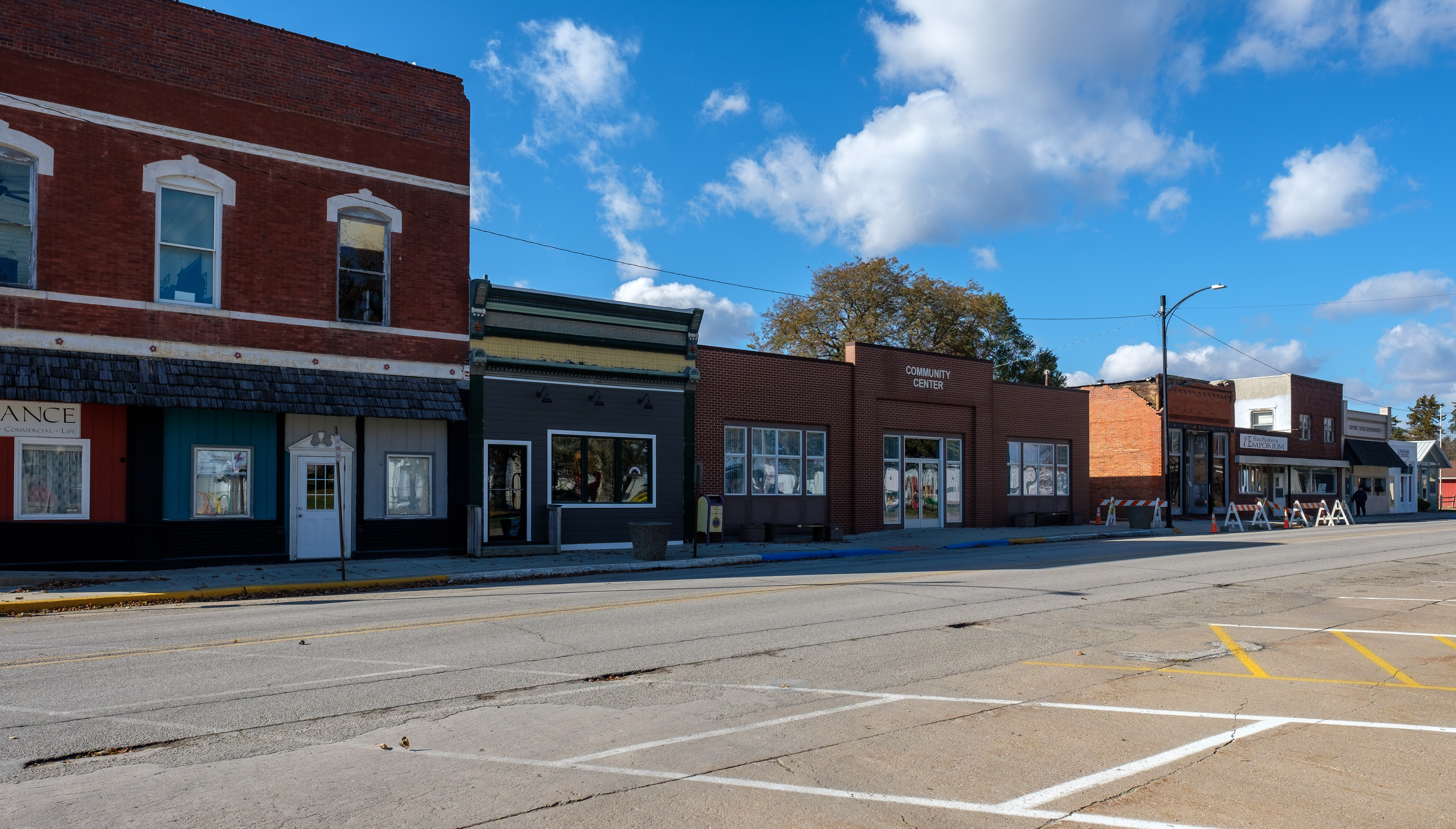
- North Douglas Street in Afton

- Location of Afton, Iowa
- Coordinates: 41°01′39″N 94°11′43″W
- Country: USA
- State: Iowa
- County: Union

Area
  - Total: 1.00 sq mi (2.60 km^{2})
  - Land: 1.00 sq mi (2.60 km^{2})
  - Water: 0 sq mi (0.00 km^{2})
- Elevation: 1,230 ft (370 m)

Population (2020)
  - Total: 874
  - Density: 869.1/sq mi (335.56/km^{2})
- Time zone: UTC-6 (Central (CST))
  - Summer (DST): UTC-5 (CDT)
- ZIP code: 50830
- Area code: 641
- FIPS code: 19-00595
- GNIS feature ID: 2393888
- Website: aftoniowa.com

Afton is a city in Union County, Iowa. The population was 874 at the time of the 2020 census. Its peak of population was in 1880, at 1,231 residents, when numerous European immigrants and migrants from the eastern United States settled here for the farmland. Mechanization of farming and consolidation of farms has reduced the population.

== History ==
Afton was platted in 1854 and named after the poem "Sweet Afton" by Robert Burns. Afton became incorporated November 30, 1868.

== Geography ==
According to the United States Census Bureau, the city has a total area of 0.99 square miles (2.56 km^{2}), all land.

== Demographics ==
Historical populations
| Year | Pop. | ±% |
|---|---|---|
| 1870 | 961 | — |
| 1880 | 1,231 | +28.1% |
| 1890 | 1,045 | −15.1% |
| 1900 | 1,178 | +12.7% |
| 1910 | 1,014 | −13.9% |
| 1920 | 926 | −8.7% |
| 1930 | 1,013 | +9.4% |
| 1940 | 987 | −2.6% |
| 1950 | 936 | −5.2% |
| 1960 | 773 | −17.4% |
| 1970 | 823 | +6.5% |
| 1980 | 985 | +19.7% |
| 1990 | 953 | −3.2% |
| 2000 | 917 | −3.8% |
| 2010 | 845 | −7.9% |
| 2020 | 874 | +3.4% |
Source:"U.S. Census website". United States Census Bureau. and Iowa Data Center; Source: U.S. Decennial Census

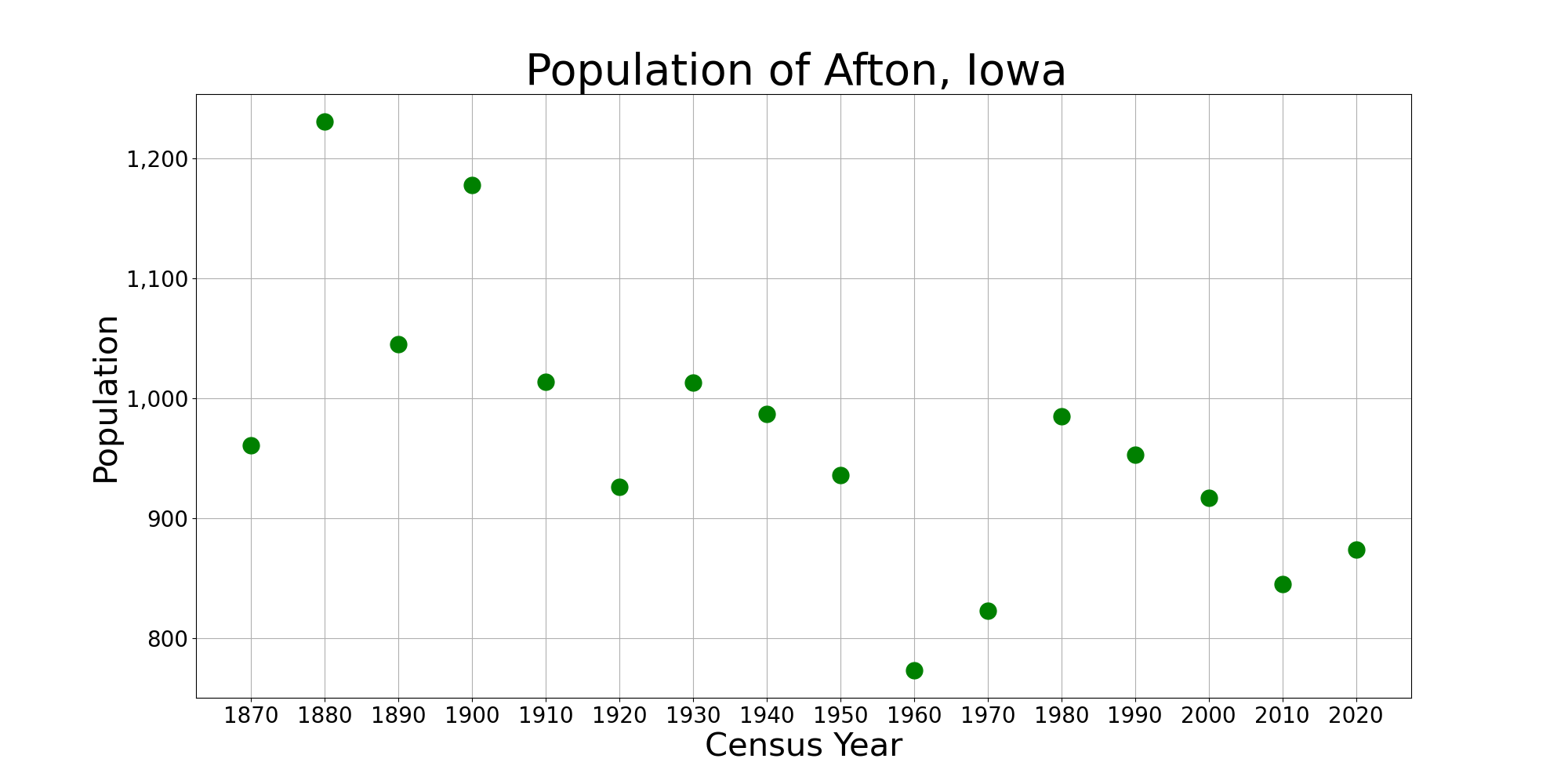
The population of Afton, Iowa from US census data

=== 2020 census ===
As of the census of 2020, there were 874 people, 357 households, and 225 families residing in the city. The population density was 869.1 inhabitants per square mile (335.6/km^{2}). There were 402 housing units at an average density of 399.7 per square mile (154.3/km^{2}). The racial makeup of the city was 94.5% White, 0.1% Black or African American, 0.1% Native American, 0.3% Asian, 0.0% Pacific Islander, 0.8% from other races and 4.1% from two or more races. Hispanic or Latino persons of any race comprised 4.3% of the population.

Of the 357 households, 31.7% of which had children under the age of 18 living with them, 47.6% were married couples living together, 6.4% were cohabitating couples, 31.9% had a female householder with no spouse or partner present and 14.0% had a male householder with no spouse or partner present. 37.0% of all households were non-families. 31.4% of all households were made up of individuals, 14.8% had someone living alone who was 65 years old or older.

The median age in the city was 39.3 years. 27.9% of the residents were under the age of 20; 4.8% were between the ages of 20 and 24; 24.3% were from 25 and 44; 25.6% were from 45 and 64; and 17.4% were 65 years of age or older. The gender makeup of the city was 47.1% male and 52.9% female.

=== 2010 census ===
As of the census of 2010, there were 845 people, 355 households, and 218 families residing in the city. The population density was 853.5 inhabitants per square mile (329.5/km^{2}). There were 400 housing units at an average density of 404.0 per square mile (156.0/km^{2}). The racial makeup of the city was 98.6% White, 0.5% Native American, 0.1% Asian, 0.5% from other races, and 0.4% from two or more races. Hispanic or Latino of any race were 0.9% of the population.

There were 355 households, of which 31.8% had children under the age of 18 living with them, 47.3% were married couples living together, 10.4% had a female householder with no husband present, 3.7% had a male householder with no wife present, and 38.6% were non-families. 34.4% of all households were made up of individuals, and 17.1% had someone living alone who was 65 years of age or older. The average household size was 2.30 and the average family size was 2.91.

The median age in the city was 38.6 years. 26.4% of residents were under the age of 18; 6.6% were between the ages of 18 and 24; 23.8% were from 25 to 44; 25.6% were from 45 to 64; and 17.6% were 65 years of age or older. The gender makeup of the city was 49.5% male and 50.5% female.

=== 2000 census ===
As of the 2000 United States census, there were 917 people, 384 households, and 251 families residing in the city. The population density was 931.7 inhabitants per square mile (359.7/km^{2}). There were 407 housing units at an average density of 413.5 per square mile (159.7/km^{2}). The racial makeup of the city was 98.69% White, 0.87% from other races, and 0.44% from two or more races. Hispanic or Latino of any race were 1.85% of the population.

There were 384 households, out of which 29.4% had children under the age of 18 living with them, 52.9% were married couples living together, 8.9% had a female householder with no husband present, and 34.4% were non-families. 31.0% of all households were made up of individuals, and 19.0% had someone living alone who was 65 years of age or older. The average household size was 2.32 and the average family size was 2.88.

In the city, the population was spread out, with 24.9% under the age of 18, 8.3% from 18 to 24, 26.0% from 25 to 44, 23.0% from 45 to 64, and 17.9% who were 65 years of age or older. The median age was 40 years. For every 100 females, there were 94.7 males. For every 100 females age 18 and over, there were 89.3 males.

The median income for a household in the city was $28,281, and the median income for a family was $35,848. Males had a median income of $25,707 versus $17,917 for females. The per capita income for the city was $12,920. About 13.6% of families and 19.4% of the population were below the poverty line, including 25.8% of those under age 18 and 19.7% of those age 65 or over.

== Notable people ==
- Cynthia May Alden, early 20th-century journalist
- J. B. West, White House chief usher from 1957 to 1969
