= Lorimor, Iowa =

- City
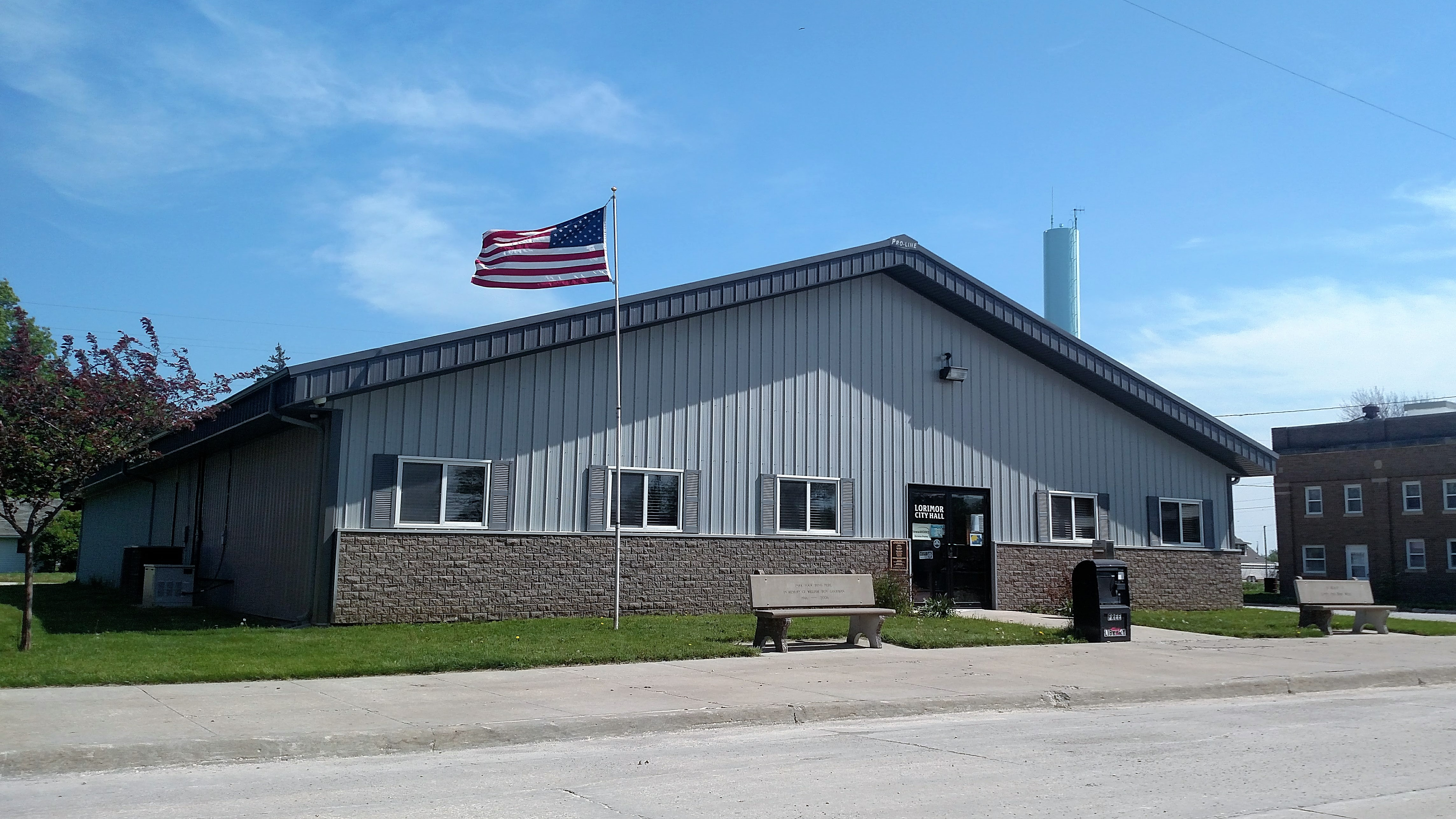
- City Hall
- Motto(s): Where The Mississippi and Missouri Divide
- Location of Lorimor, Iowa
- Coordinates: 41°07′31″N 94°03′25″W
- Country: USA
- State: Iowa
- County: Union
- Established: 1892

Area
  - Total: 0.43 sq mi (1.12 km^{2})
  - Land: 0.43 sq mi (1.12 km^{2})
  - Water: 0 sq mi (0.00 km^{2})
- Elevation: 1,234 ft (376 m)

Population (2020)
  - Total: 386
  - Density: 894.7/sq mi (345.44/km^{2})
- Time zone: UTC-6 (Central (CST))
  - Summer (DST): UTC-5 (CDT)
- ZIP code: 50149
- Area code: 641
- FIPS code: 19-46515
- GNIS feature ID: 2395765
- Website: https://www.lorimor.org/

Lorimor is a city in Union County, Iowa, United States. The population was 386 at the time of the 2020 census.

== History ==
Lorimor was founded in 1887 when J.S. Lorimor donated a portion of his farm to the Chicago Great Western Railway, on which a railway right-of-way, station and town were built. The town grew to almost 400 in five years, and had a population of almost 700 around 1910.

Lorimar was incorporated in 1892.

Much of the town was destroyed by fire in the 1890s, leading to ordinances requiring new business to be built of brick or other fire-resistant materials.

== Geography ==
According to the United States Census Bureau, the city has a total area of 0.43 square miles (1.11 km^{2}), all land.

== Demographics ==
Historical populations
Year	Pop.	±%
1900	587	—
1910	645	+9.9%
1920	678	+5.1%
1930	577	−14.9%
1940	614	+6.4%
1950	505	−17.8%
1960	460	−8.9%
1970	346	−24.8%
1980	405	+17.1%
1990	377	−6.9%
2000	427	+13.3%
2010	360	−15.7%
2020	386	+7.2%
Source:"U.S. Census website". United States Census Bureau. and Iowa Data Center; Source: U.S. Decennial Census

=== 2020 census ===
As of the census of 2020, there were 386 people, 158 households, and 97 families residing in the city. The population density was 894.7 inhabitants per square mile (345.4/km^{2}). There were 193 housing units at an average density of 447.3 per square mile (172.7/km^{2}). The racial makeup of the city was 95.9% White, 0.5% Black or African American, 0.5% Native American, 0.5% Asian, 0.0% Pacific Islander, 0.0% from other races and 2.6% from two or more races. Hispanic or Latino persons of any race comprised 2.3% of the population.

Of the 158 households, 34.8% of which had children under the age of 18 living with them, 43.0% were married couples living together, 11.4% were cohabitating couples, 24.1% had a female householder with no spouse or partner present and 21.5% had a male householder with no spouse or partner present. 38.6% of all households were non-families. 31.0% of all households were made up of individuals, 10.8% had someone living alone who was 65 years old or older.

The median age in the city was 35.3 years. 31.6% of the residents were under the age of 20; 4.1% were between the ages of 20 and 24; 25.1% were from 25 and 44; 24.6% were from 45 and 64; and 14.5% were 65 years of age or older. The gender makeup of the city was 52.3% male and 47.7% female.

=== 2010 census ===
As of the census of 2010, there were 360 people, 160 households, and 104 families residing in the city. The population density was 947.4 inhabitants per square mile (365.8/km^{2}). There were 211 housing units at an average density of 555.3 per square mile (214.4/km^{2}). The racial makeup of the city was 98.1% White, 0.3% African American, 0.8% Native American, and 0.8% from two or more races. Hispanic or Latino of any race were 0.8% of the population.

There were 160 households, of which 28.8% had children under the age of 18 living with them, 43.8% were married couples living together, 13.8% had a female householder with no husband present, 7.5% had a male householder with no wife present, and 35.0% were non-families. 31.3% of all households were made up of individuals, and 13.1% had someone living alone who was 65 years of age or older. The average household size was 2.25 and the average family size was 2.72.

The median age in the city was 42.2 years. 22.5% of residents were under the age of 18; 7.5% were between the ages of 18 and 24; 24.1% were from 25 to 44; 29.6% were from 45 to 64; and 16.4% were 65 years of age or older. The gender makeup of the city was 45.8% male and 54.2% female.

=== 2000 census ===
As of the census of 2000, there were 427 people, 176 households, and 114 families residing in the city. The population density was 1,055.2 inhabitants per square mile (407.4/km^{2}). There were 188 housing units at an average density of 464.6 per square mile (179.4/km^{2}). The racial makeup of the city was 98.83% White, 0.23% Native American, 0.47% Asian, and 0.47% from two or more races. Hispanic or Latino of any race were 0.47% of the population.

There were 176 households, out of which 31.3% had children under the age of 18 living with them, 51.7% were married couples living together, 10.8% had a female householder with no husband present, and 34.7% were non-families. 27.8% of all households were made up of individuals, and 13.1% had someone living alone who was 65 years of age or older. The average household size was 2.43 and the average family size was 2.99.

In the city, the population was spread out, with 28.3% under the age of 18, 8.0% from 18 to 24, 27.4% from 25 to 44, 21.8% from 45 to 64, and 14.5% who were 65 years of age or older. The median age was 35 years. For every 100 females, there were 92.3 males. For every 100 females age 18 and over, there were 90.1 males.

The median income for a household in the city was $28,636, and the median income for a family was $30,500. Males had a median income of $26,071 versus $20,179 for females. The per capita income for the city was $12,713. About 13.2% of families and 18.9% of the population were below the poverty line, including 31.9% of those under age 18 and 11.8% of those age 65 or over.

== Gallery ==
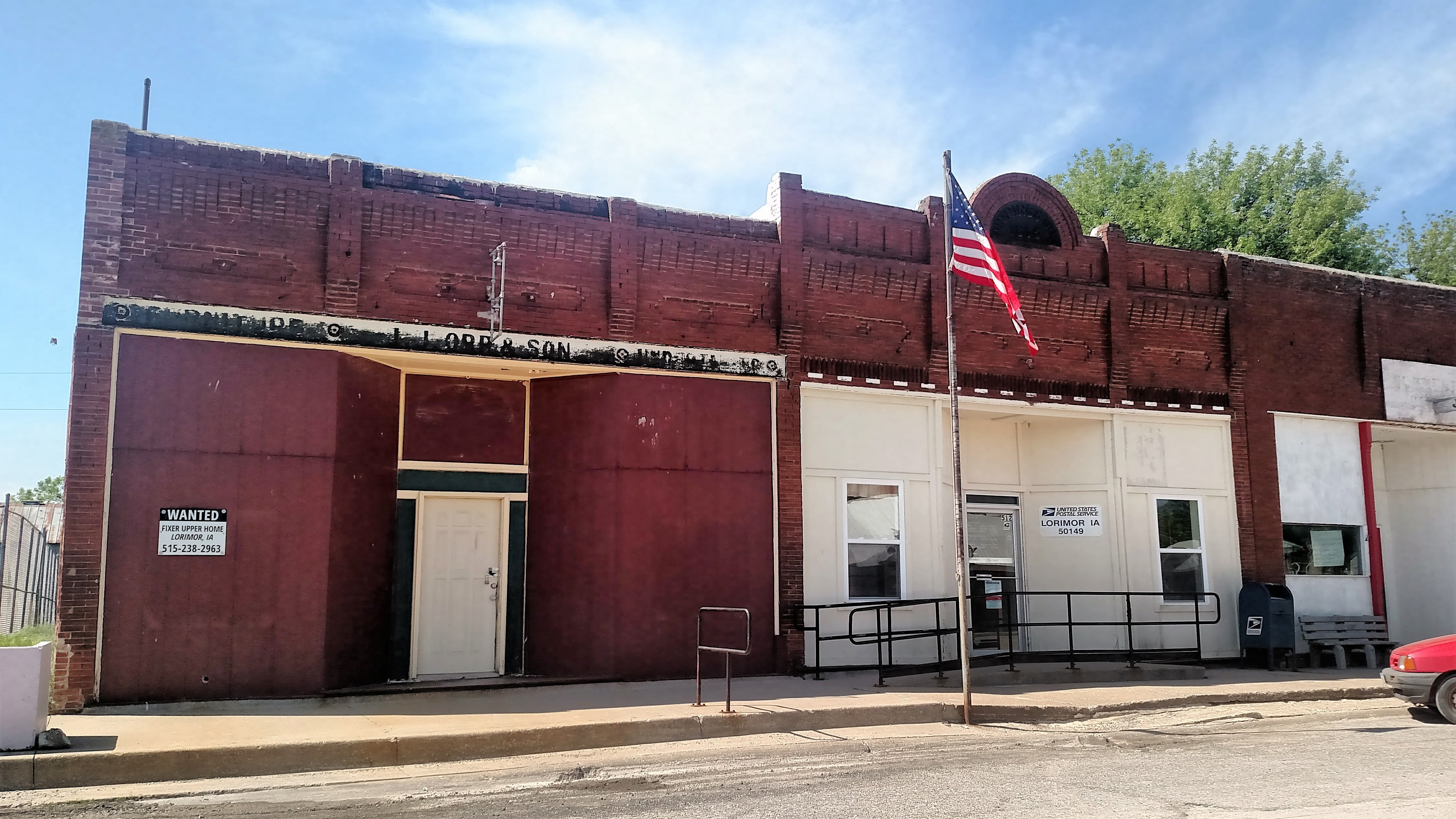
Lorimor Post Office

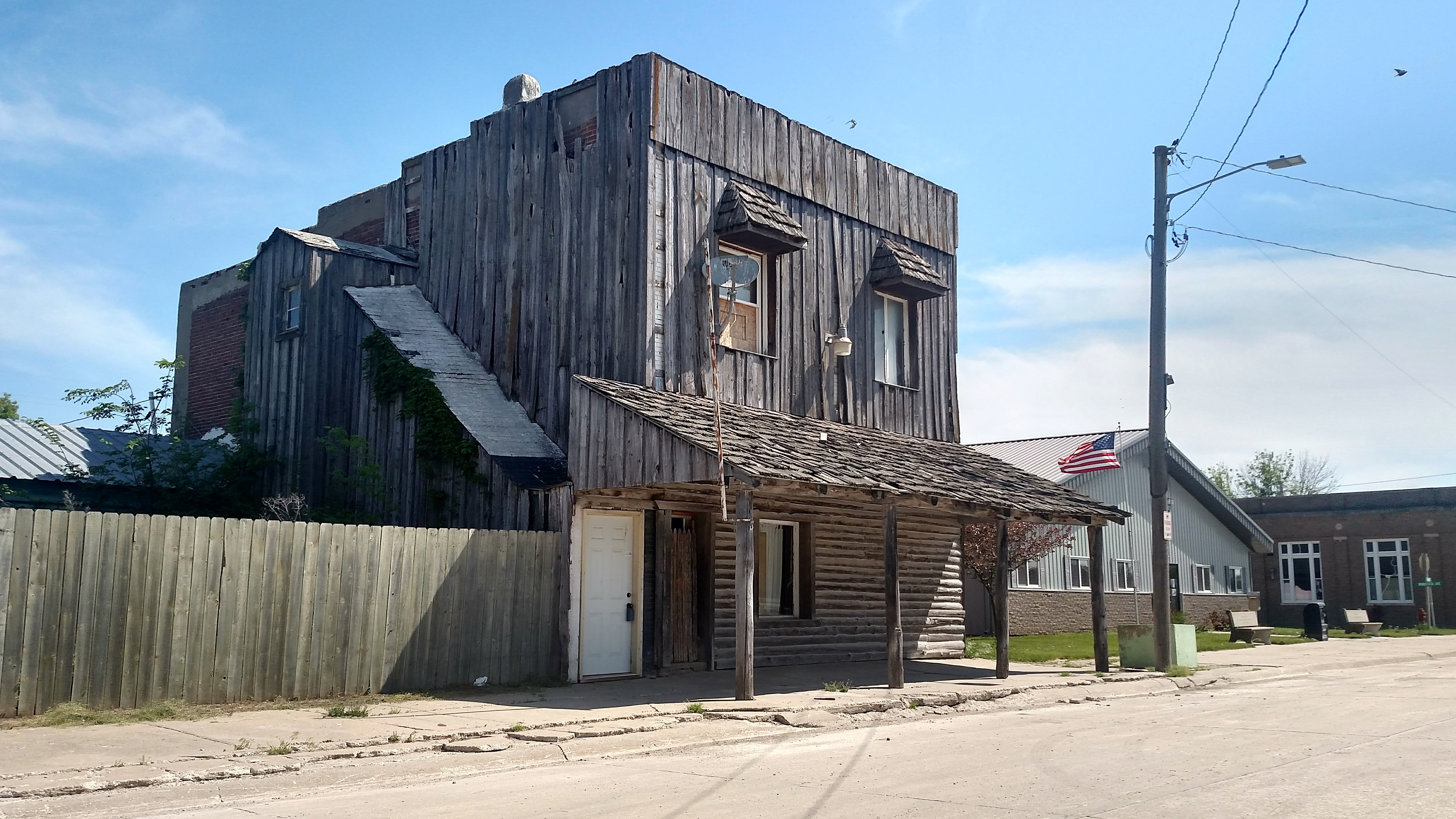
Historic structure in Downtown Lorimor

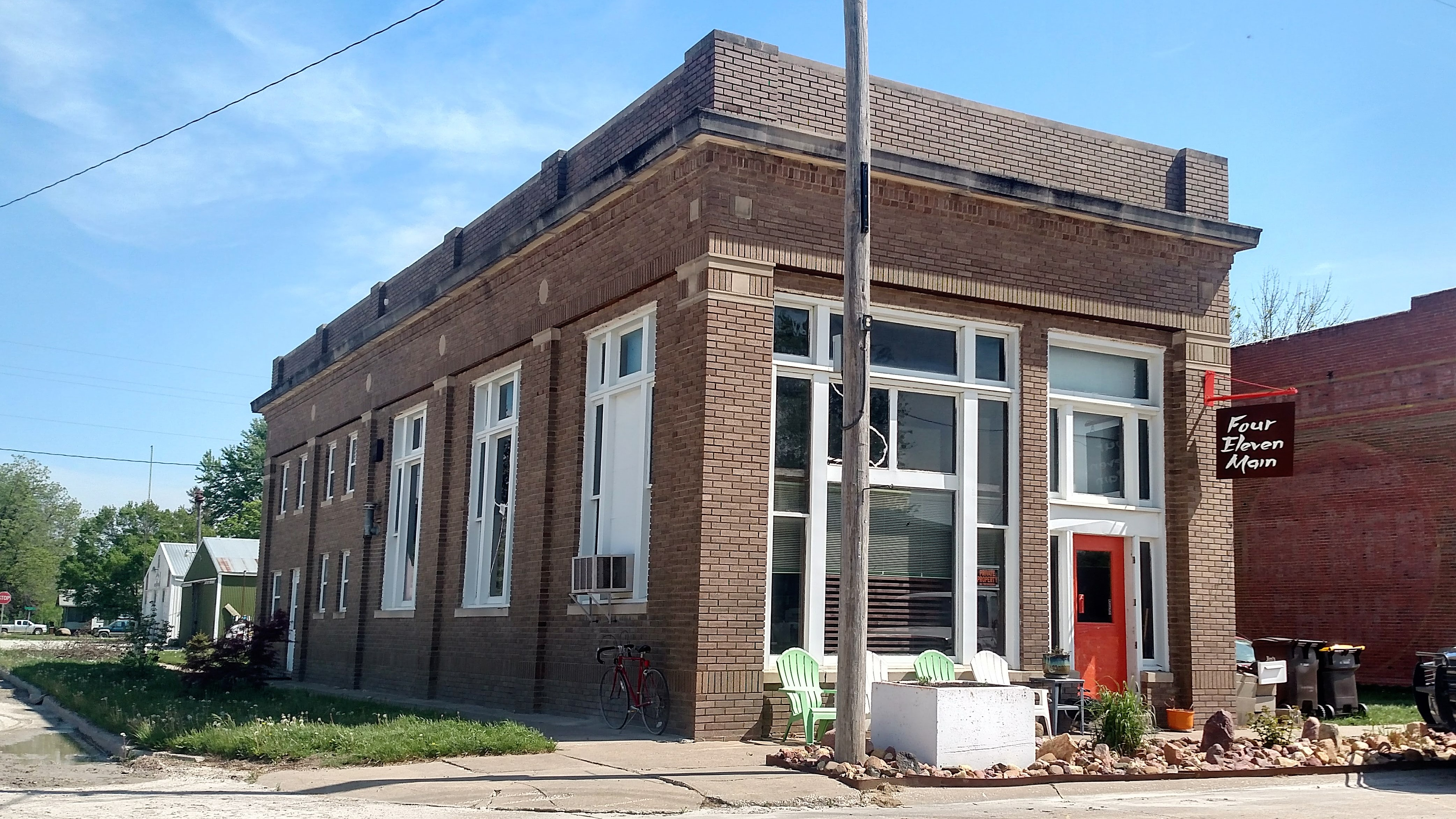
Historic structure in Downtown Lorimor

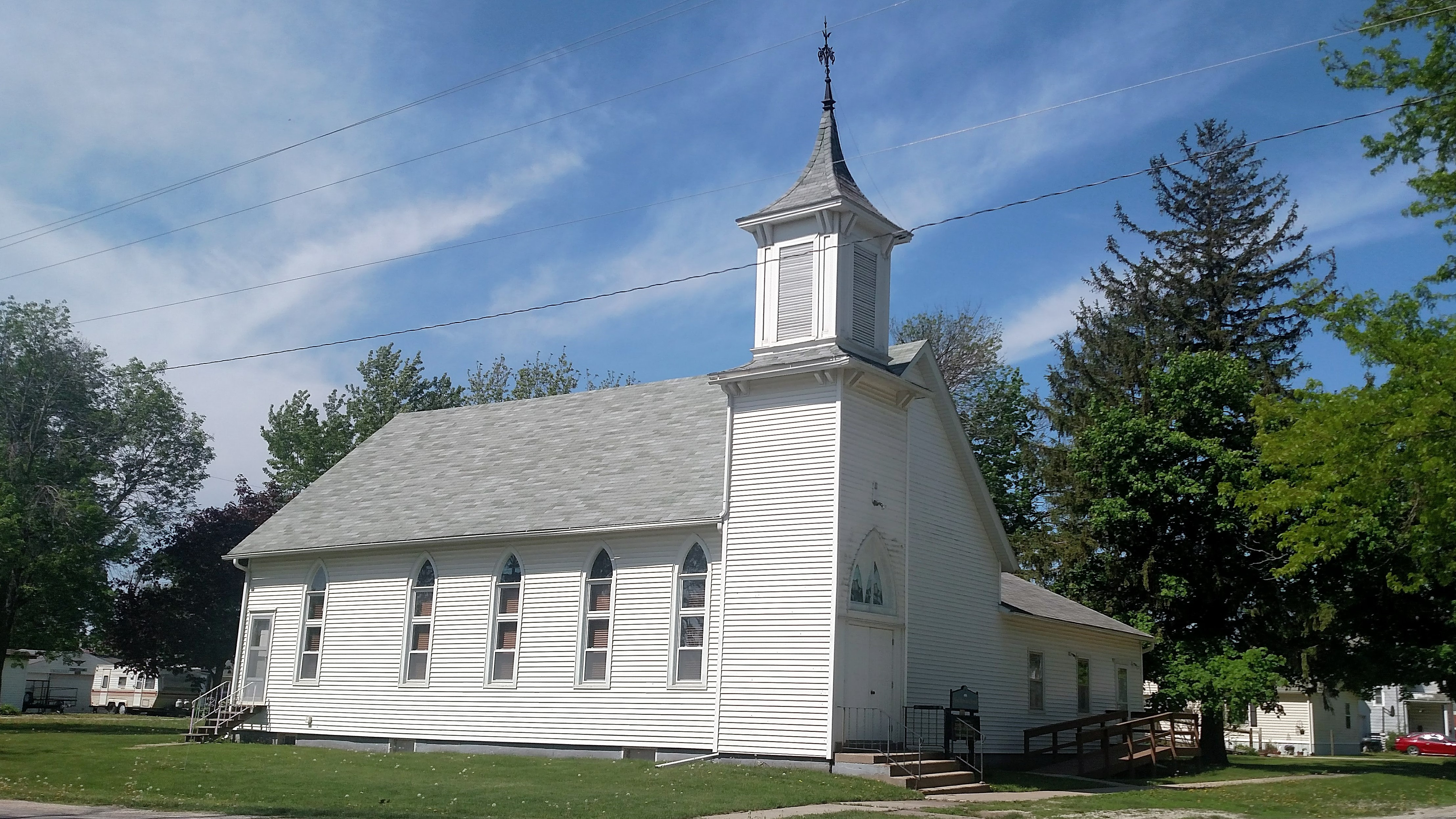
Baptist Church

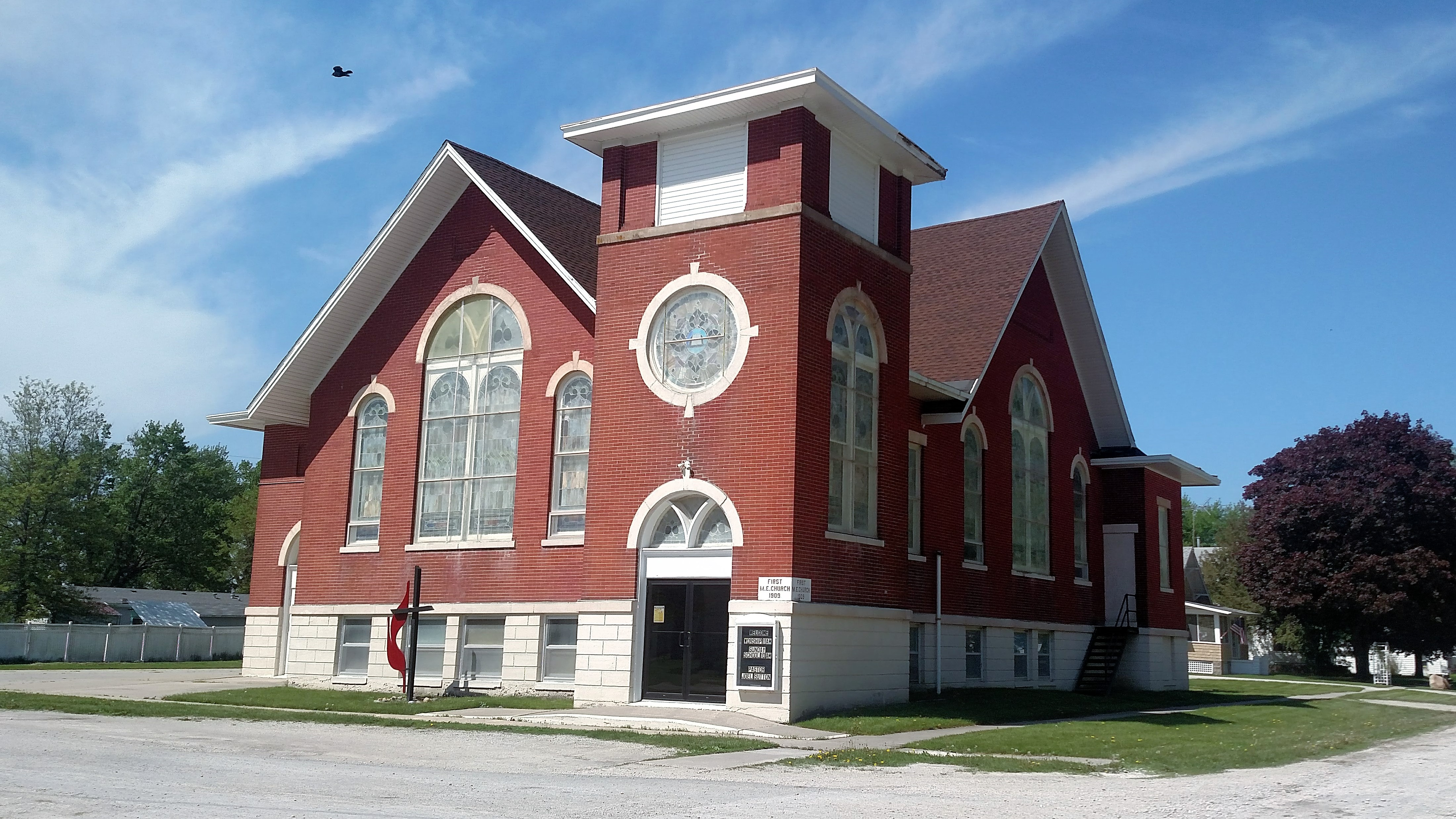
Methodist Church

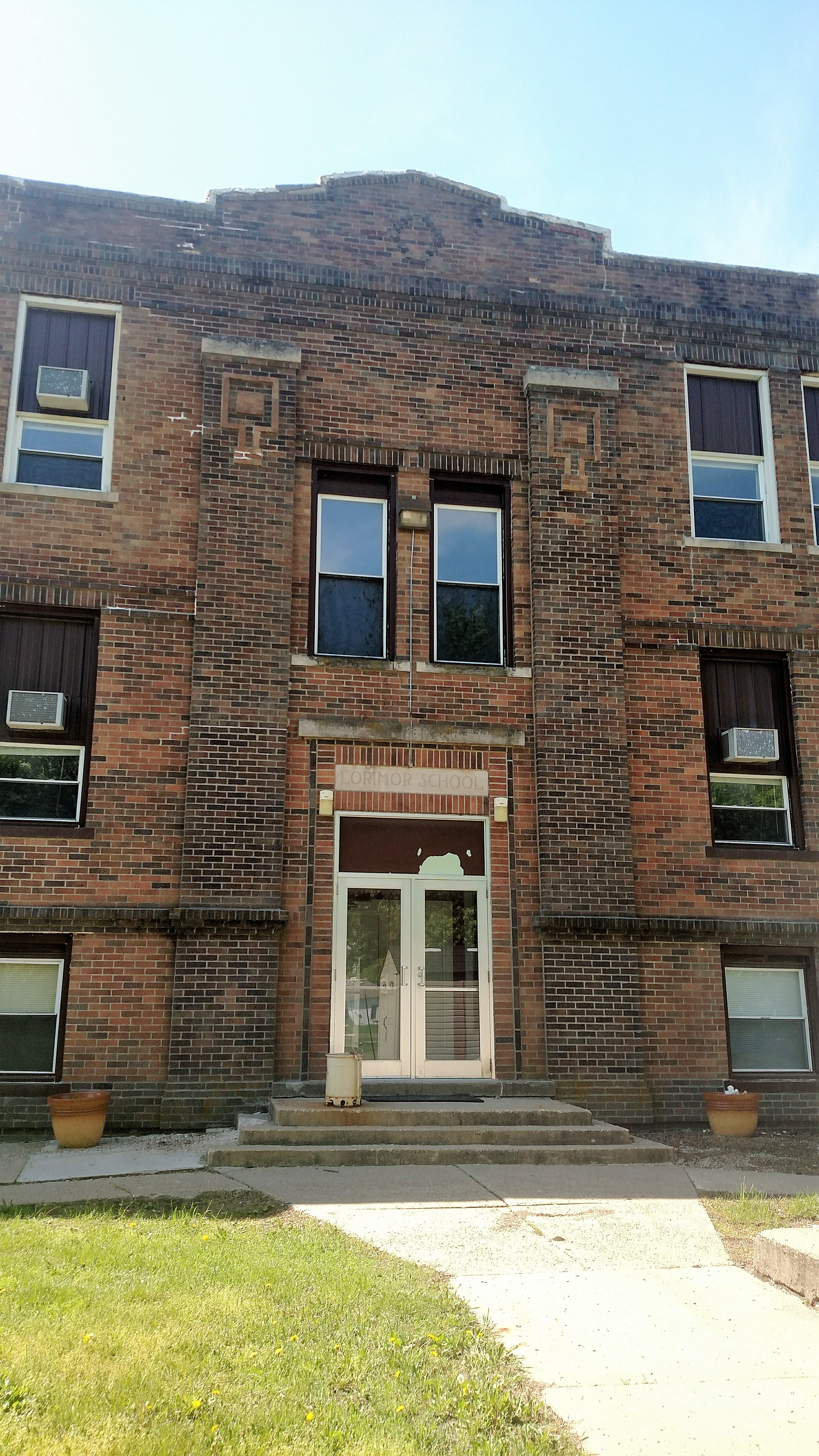
Lorimor School
