= Thayer, Iowa =

- City
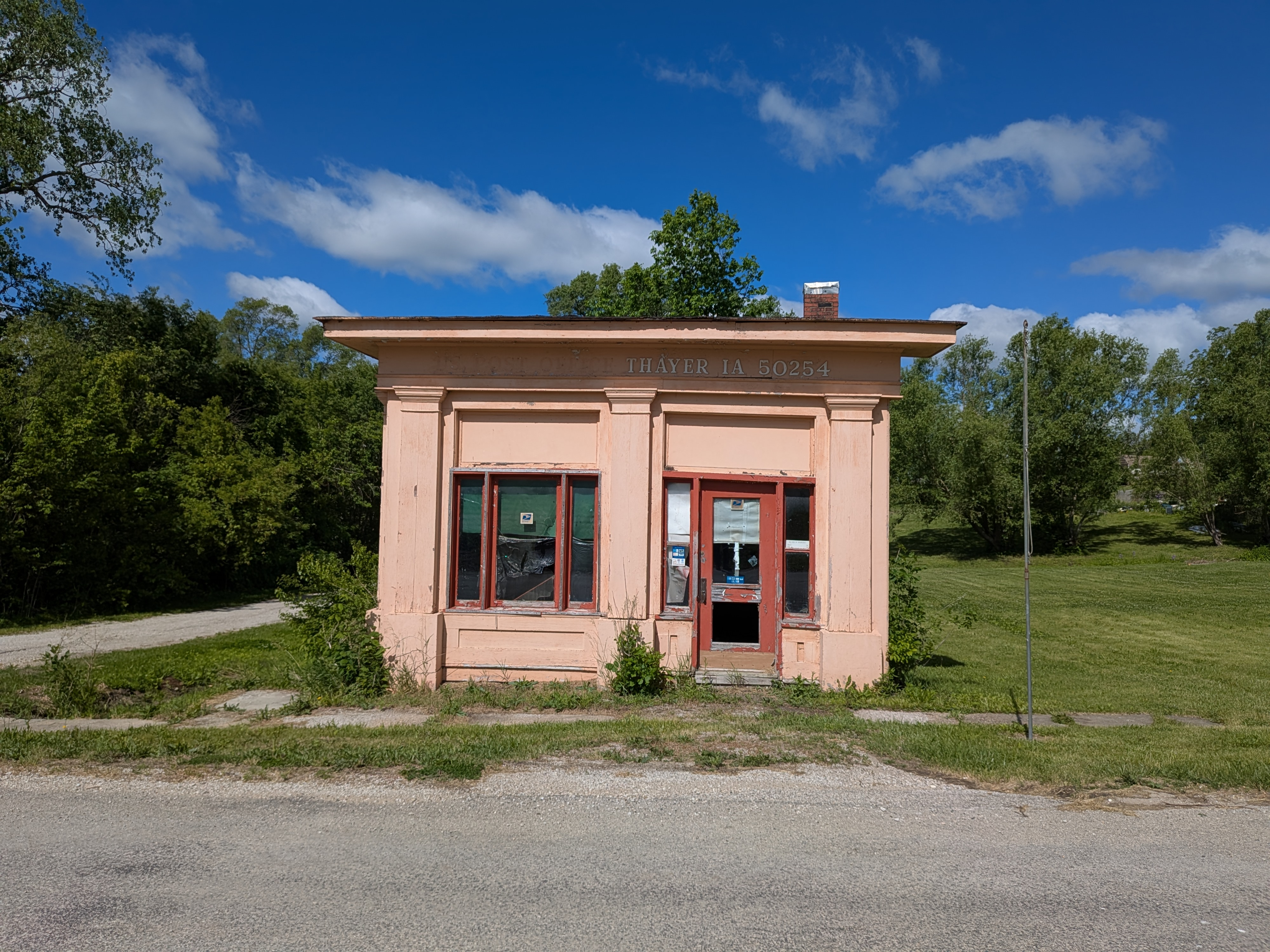
- The Thayer, Iowa post office

- Location of Thayer, Iowa
- Coordinates: 41°01′43″N 94°03′00″W
- Country: USA
- State: Iowa
- County: Union

Area
  - Total: 0.14 sq mi (0.37 km^{2})
  - Land: 0.14 sq mi (0.37 km^{2})
  - Water: 0 sq mi (0.00 km^{2})
- Elevation: 1,122 ft (342 m)

Population (2020)
  - Total: 51
  - Density: 357.8/sq mi (138.15/km^{2})
- Time zone: UTC-6 (Central (CST))
  - Summer (DST): UTC-5 (CDT)
- ZIP code: 50254
- Area code: 641
- FIPS code: 19-77565
- GNIS feature ID: 2396045

Thayer is a city in Union County, Iowa, United States. The population was 51 at the time of the 2020 census.

== Geography ==
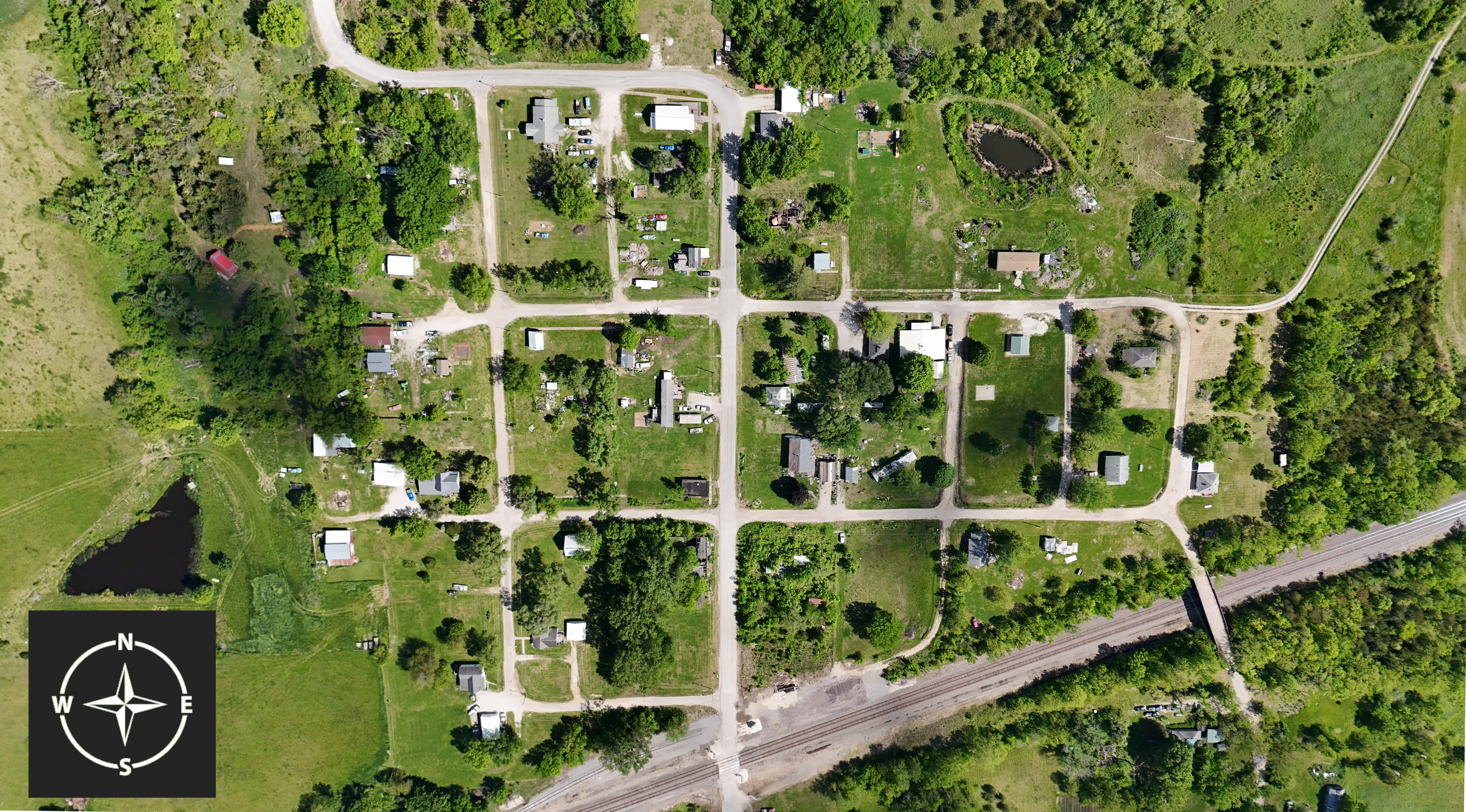
An aerial view of Thayer, Iowa

According to the United States Census Bureau, the city has a total area of 0.09 square miles (0.23 km^{2}), all land.

== Demographics ==
Historical populations
Year	Pop.	±%
1900	394	—
1910	198	−49.7%
1920	260	+31.3%
1930	164	−36.9%
1940	157	−4.3%
1950	152	−3.2%
1960	101	−33.6%
1970	100	−1.0%
1980	87	−13.0%
1990	79	−9.2%
2000	66	−16.5%
2010	59	−10.6%
2020	51	−13.6%
Source:"U.S. Census website". United States Census Bureau. and Iowa Data Center; Source: U.S. Decennial Census

=== 2020 census ===
As of the census of 2020, there were 51 people, 21 households, and 16 families residing in the city. The population density was 357.8 inhabitants per square mile (138.1/km^{2}). There were 22 housing units at an average density of 154.3 per square mile (59.6/km^{2}). The racial makeup of the city was 88.2% White, 0.0% Black or African American, 0.0% Native American, 5.9% Asian, 0.0% Pacific Islander, 0.0% from other races and 5.9% from two or more races. Hispanic or Latino persons of any race comprised 2.0% of the population.

Of the 21 households, 42.9% of which had children under the age of 18 living with them, 38.1% were married couples living together, 19.0% were cohabitating couples, 4.8% had a female householder with no spouse or partner present and 38.1% had a male householder with no spouse or partner present. 23.8% of all households were non-families. 14.3% of all households were made up of individuals, 4.8% had someone living alone who was 65 years old or older.

The median age in the city was 34.5 years. 21.6% of the residents were under the age of 20; 9.8% were between the ages of 20 and 24; 33.3% were from 25 and 44; 25.5% were from 45 and 64; and 9.8% were 65 years of age or older. The gender makeup of the city was 51.0% male and 49.0% female.

=== 2010 census ===
As of the census of 2010, there were 59 people, 24 households, and 15 families residing in the city. The population density was 655.6 inhabitants per square mile (253.1/km^{2}). There were 29 housing units at an average density of 322.2 per square mile (124.4/km^{2}). The racial makeup of the city was 100.0% White.

There were 24 households, of which 37.5% had children under the age of 18 living with them, 37.5% were married couples living together, 4.2% had a female householder with no husband present, 20.8% had a male householder with no wife present, and 37.5% were non-families. 33.3% of all households were made up of individuals, and 4.2% had someone living alone who was 65 years of age or older. The average household size was 2.46 and the average family size was 3.00.

The median age in the city was 36.5 years. 25.4% of residents were under the age of 18; 10.3% were between the ages of 18 and 24; 37.3% were from 25 to 44; 18.7% were from 45 to 64; and 8.5% were 65 years of age or older. The gender makeup of the city was 57.6% male and 42.4% female.

=== 2000 census ===
As of the census of 2000, there were 66 people, 26 households, and 15 families residing in the city. The population density was 672.7 inhabitants per square mile (259.7/km^{2}). There were 35 housing units at an average density of 356.7 per square mile (137.7/km^{2}). The racial makeup of the city was 96.97% White and 3.03% Native American.

There were 26 households, out of which 26.9% had children under the age of 18 living with them, 46.2% were married couples living together, none had a female householder with no husband present, and 38.5% were non-families. 26.9% of all households were made up of individuals, and 15.4% had someone living alone who was 65 years of age or older. The average household size was 2.54 and the average family size was 3.06.

In the city, the population was spread out, with 25.8% under the age of 18, 12.1% from 18 to 24, 33.3% from 25 to 44, 18.2% from 45 to 64, and 10.6% who were 65 years of age or older. The median age was 33 years. For every 100 females, there were 112.9 males. For every 100 females age 18 and over, there were 104.2 males.

The median income for a household in the city was $31,250, and the median income for a family was $38,750. Males had a median income of $21,667 versus $12,500 for females. The per capita income for the city was $13,705. 6.3% of the population but no families were below the poverty line. Out of the total population, none of those under the age of 18 and 25.0% of those 65 and older were living below the poverty line.

== See also ==
- Mount Pisgah (Iowa)
- Mormon Trail
