= Arispe, Iowa =

- City
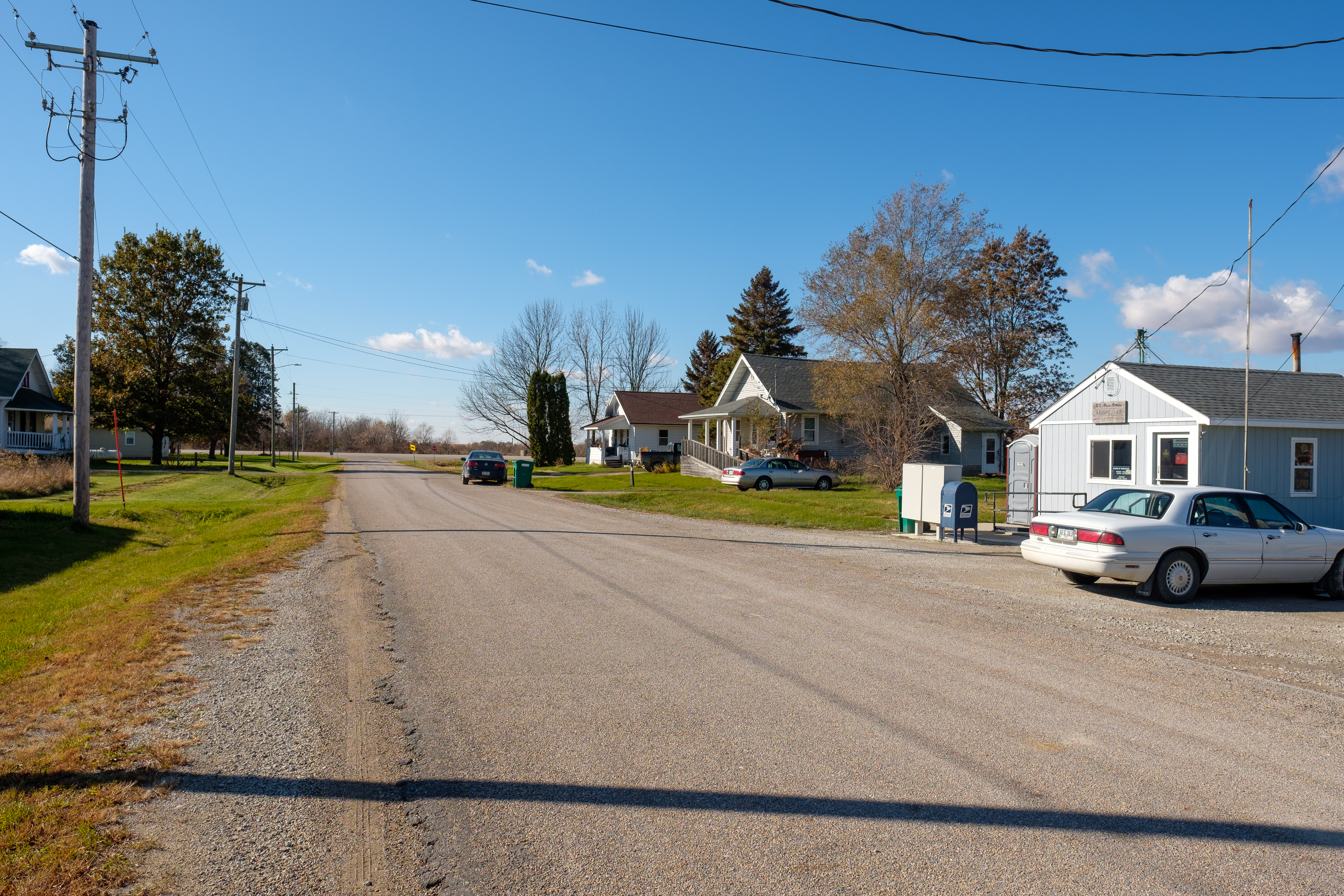
- H-45 Street Looking west

- Location of Arispe, Iowa
- Coordinates: 40°56′54″N 94°13′09″W
- Country: United States
- State: Iowa
- County: Union

Area
  - Total: 0.50 sq mi (1.30 km^{2})
  - Land: 0.50 sq mi (1.30 km^{2})
  - Water: 0 sq mi (0.00 km^{2})
- Elevation: 1,270 ft (390 m)

Population (2020)
  - Total: 96
  - Density: 191.2/sq mi (73.84/km^{2})
- Time zone: UTC-6 (Central (CST))
  - Summer (DST): UTC-5 (CDT)
- ZIP code: 50831
- Area code: 641
- FIPS code: 19-02800
- GNIS feature ID: 2393984

Arispe (/əˈrɪspiː/) is a city in Union County, Iowa, United States. The population was 96 at the 2020 census.

== Geography ==
According to the United States Census Bureau, the city has a total area of 0.52 square miles (1.35 km^{2}), all land.

== Demographics ==
Historical populations
Year	Pop.	±%
1910	155	—
1920	156	+0.6%
1930	133	−14.7%
1940	149	+12.0%
1950	110	−26.2%
1960	125	+13.6%
1970	93	−25.6%
1980	89	−4.3%
1990	92	+3.4%
2000	89	−3.3%
2010	100	+12.4%
2020	96	−4.0%
Source:"U.S. Census website". United States Census Bureau. and Iowa Data Center; Source: U.S. Decennial Census

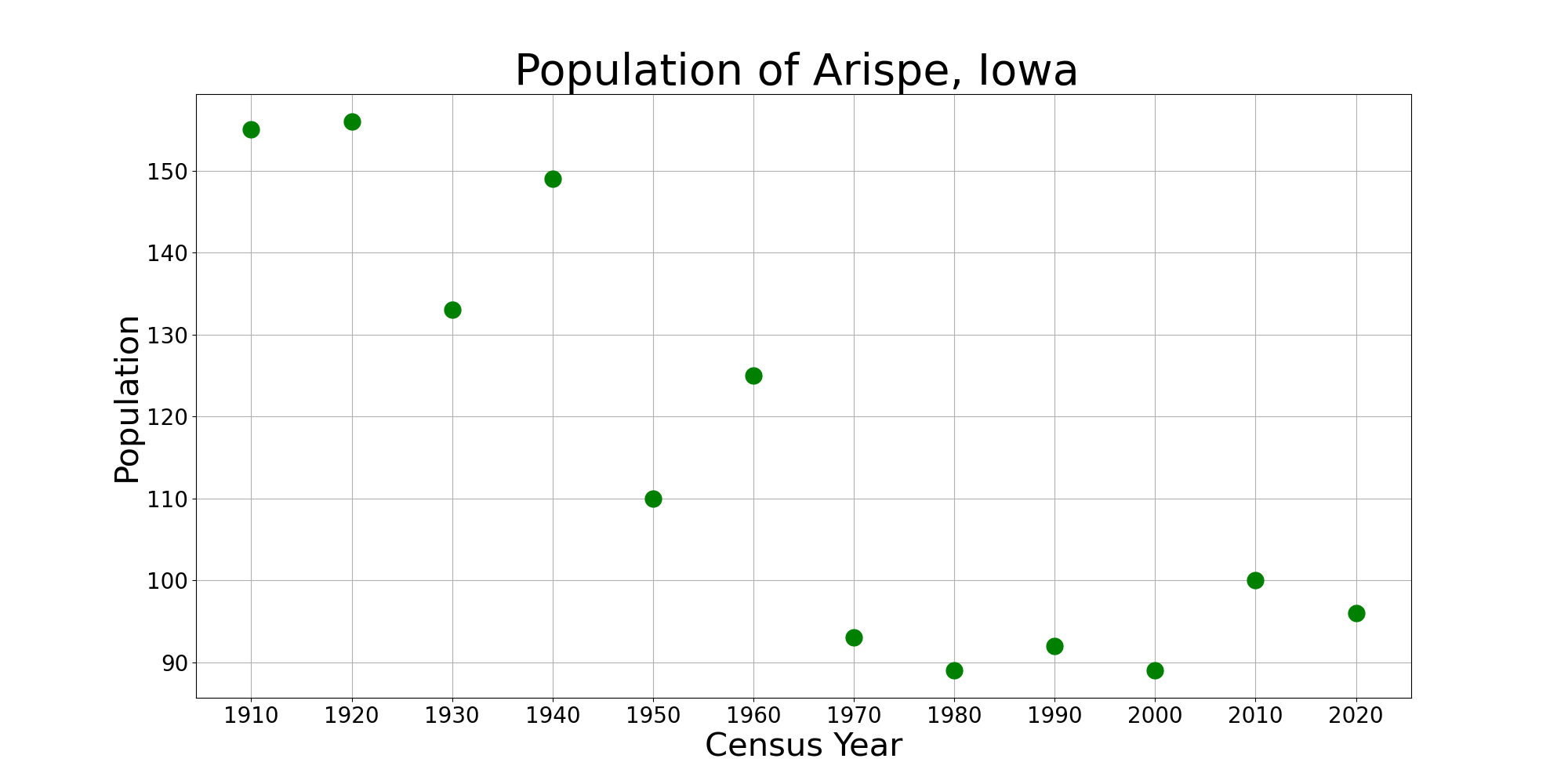
The population of Arispe, Iowa from US census data

=== 2020 census ===
As of the census of 2020, there were 96 people, 41 households, and 23 families residing in the city. The population density was 191.2 inhabitants per square mile (73.8/km^{2}). There were 42 housing units at an average density of 83.7 per square mile (32.3/km^{2}). The racial makeup of the city was 93.8% White, 0.0% Black or African American, 0.0% Native American, 1.0% Asian, 0.0% Pacific Islander, 0.0% from other races and 5.2% from two or more races. Hispanic or Latino persons of any race comprised 0.0% of the population.

Of the 41 households, 31.7% of which had children under the age of 18 living with them, 39.0% were married couples living together, 19.5% were cohabitating couples, 17.1% had a female householder with no spouse or partner present and 24.4% had a male householder with no spouse or partner present. 43.9% of all households were non-families. 26.8% of all households were made up of individuals, 7.3% had someone living alone who was 65 years old or older.

The median age in the city was 47.5 years. 27.1% of the residents were under the age of 20; 5.2% were between the ages of 20 and 24; 16.7% were from 25 and 44; 29.2% were from 45 and 64; and 21.9% were 65 years of age or older. The gender makeup of the city was 53.1% male and 46.9% female.

=== 2010 census ===
As of the census of 2010, there were 100 people, 42 households, and 32 families residing in the city. The population density was 192.3 inhabitants per square mile (74.2/km^{2}). There were 49 housing units at an average density of 94.2 per square mile (36.4/km^{2}). The racial makeup of the city was 100.0% White.

There were 42 households, of which 35.7% had children under the age of 18 living with them, 57.1% were married couples living together, 11.9% had a female householder with no husband present, 7.1% had a male householder with no wife present, and 23.8% were non-families. 19.0% of all households were made up of individuals, and 11.9% had someone living alone who was 65 years of age or older. The average household size was 2.38 and the average family size was 2.66.

The median age in the city was 41 years. 27% of residents were under the age of 18; 7% were between the ages of 18 and 24; 19% were from 25 to 44; 31% were from 45 to 64; and 16% were 65 years of age or older. The gender makeup of the city was 47.0% male and 53.0% female.

=== 2000 census ===
As of the census of 2000, there were 89 people, 42 households, and 25 families residing in the city. The population density was 171.6 inhabitants per square mile (66.3/km^{2}). There were 44 housing units at an average density of 84.9 per square mile (32.8/km^{2}). The racial makeup of the city was 100.00% White.

There were 42 households, out of which 21.4% had children under the age of 18 living with them, 59.5% were married couples living together, 2.4% had a female householder with no husband present, and 38.1% were non-families. 35.7% of all households were made up of individuals, and 23.8% had someone living alone who was 65 years of age or older. The average household size was 2.12 and the average family size was 2.77.

In the city, the population was spread out, with 19.1% under the age of 18, 3.4% from 18 to 24, 21.3% from 25 to 44, 23.6% from 45 to 64, and 32.6% who were 65 years of age or older. The median age was 49 years. For every 100 females, there were 85.4 males. For every 100 females age 18 and over, there were 94.6 males.

The median income for a household in the city was $25,000, and the median income for a family was $27,917. Males had a median income of $16,250 versus $14,167 for females. The per capita income for the city was $11,999. There were 17.4% of families and 11.7% of the population living below the poverty line, including no under eighteens and 27.6% of those over 64.

== Notable person ==
- Harold R. Gross, member of the United States House of Representatives in the 20th century.
