= National Register of Historic Places listings in Black Hawk County, Iowa =

Location of Black Hawk County in Iowa

Here is presented a listing of the National Register of Historic Places in Black Hawk County, Iowa.

The list is intended to give a complete review of the properties and districts on the National Register of Historic Places in Black Hawk County, Iowa, United States. Latitude and longitude coordinates are provided for many National Register properties and districts; these locations can be seen on an online map.

There are 50 properties and districts listed in the National Register of the county. Four properties were once listed but have since been removed.

This National Park Service list is complete through NPS recent listings posted September 4, 2026.

== Current listings ==
	Name on the Register	Image	Date listed	Location	City or town	Description
1	Bennington No. 4	Bennington No. 4	January 16, 2001 (#00001651)	Junction of Bennington and Sage Rds. 42°36′00″N 92°17′50″W	Waterloo	
2	Black Hawk County Soldiers Memorial Hall	Black Hawk County Soldiers Memorial Hall	November 29, 1988 (#88001322)	194 W. 5th St. 42°29′44″N 92°20′18″W	Waterloo	
3	Black Hawk Hotel	Black Hawk Hotel	December 19, 2002 (#02001542)	115-119 Main St. 42°32′15″N 92°26′44″W	Cedar Falls	
4	Campbell Baking Company	Campbell Baking Company	May 2, 2016 (#16000213)	325 Commercial St. 42°29′49″N 92°20′32″W	Waterloo	
5	Cedar Falls Downtown Historic District	Cedar Falls Downtown Historic District	October 2, 2017 (#100001673)	102-422 Main, 100 blk. E. & W. 2nd, 100 blk. E. & W. 3rd, 100 blk. E. 4th Sts. 42°32′10″N 92°26′44″W	Cedar Falls	
6	Cedar Falls Ice House	Cedar Falls Ice House	October 21, 1977 (#77000494)	Franklin Avenue and First Street; 42°32′19″N 92°26′55″W	Cedar Falls	
7	Cedar Falls Independent Order of Odd Fellows	Cedar Falls Independent Order of Odd Fellows	May 2, 1997 (#97000384)	401-403 Main St. 42°32′05″N 92°26′41″W	Cedar Falls	
8	Cedar Falls Post Office	Cedar Falls Post Office	March 8, 2016 (#16000057)	217 Washington St. 42°32′10″N 92°26′49″W	Cedar Falls	
9	Chapple and Young Block	Chapple and Young Block	September 20, 2002 (#02001025)	316-318-320 Main St. 42°18′48″N 92°11′21″W	La Porte City	
10	Chicago Great Western Railroad-Waterloo Freight Depot	Chicago Great Western Railroad-Waterloo Freight Depot	January 17, 1997 (#88001325)	6th St. 42°29′41″N 92°20′01″W	Waterloo	
11	Cotton Theater	Cotton Theater	July 23, 1993 (#93000764)	103 Main St. 42°32′14″N 92°26′42″W	Cedar Falls	
12	Dunkerton Bridge	Dunkerton Bridge	June 25, 1998 (#98000768)	Local street over Crane Creek; 42°34′23″N 92°09′38″W	Dunkerton	
13	Dunsmore House	Dunsmore House	November 17, 1977 (#77000497)	902 Logan Ave. 42°30′48″N 92°20′14″W	Waterloo	
14	Emerson School	Emerson School	December 29, 2004 (#04001403)	314 Randolph St. 42°29′34″N 92°20′51″W	Waterloo	
15	Fire Station No. 2	Fire Station No. 2	November 29, 1988 (#88001321)	716 Commercial St. 42°29′38″N 92°20′17″W	Waterloo	
16	The Fowler Company Building	The Fowler Company Building	September 16, 2009 (#09000712)	226-228 E. 4th St. 42°29′54″N 92°20′08″W	Waterloo	
17	Friedl Bakery Building	Friedl Bakery Building	December 27, 2023 (#100009670)	302 Commercial Street; 42°29′50″N 92°20′34″W	Waterloo	
18	Clement B. Gingrich House	Clement B. Gingrich House	December 4, 1996 (#96001371)	300 Walnut St. 42°18′51″N 92°11′18″W	La Porte City	
19	Grace Methodist Episcopal Church	Grace Methodist Episcopal Church	October 6, 2011 (#11000719)	633 Walnut St. 42°30′04″N 92°19′51″W	Waterloo	
20	Highland Historic District	Highland Historic District	September 24, 1984 (#84001209)	Roughly bounded by Independence Ave. and Steely, Idaho, and Vine Sts. 42°30′01″N 92°18′42″W	Waterloo	
21	Hotel President	Hotel President	April 24, 2017 (#100000484)	500 Sycamore St. 42°29′56″N 92°20′12″W	Waterloo	
22	Hotel Russell-Lamson	Hotel Russell-Lamson	November 29, 1988 (#88001324)	201-215 W. 5th St. 42°29′39″N 92°20′19″W	Waterloo	
23	La Porte City Station	La Porte City Station	March 13, 1979 (#79003781)	202 E. Main St. 42°18′55″N 92°11′32″W	La Porte City	La Porte City's current city hall
24	August H.J. and Justena Lange Farmstead Historic District	August H.J. and Justena Lange Farmstead Historic District	May 14, 1997 (#97000385)	8214 Spring Creek Rd. 42°22′53″N 92°04′29″W	La Porte City	
25	LaPorte City Town Hall and Fire Station	LaPorte City Town Hall and Fire Station	May 12, 1977 (#77000496)	413 Chestnut; 42°18′49″N 92°11′30″W	La Porte City	La Porte City's former city hall and fire station
26	Marsh-Place Building	Marsh-Place Building	October 22, 1998 (#98001272)	627 Sycamore St. 42°29′51″N 92°20′04″W	Waterloo	
27	Master Service Station	Master Service Station	February 7, 2011 (#10001204)	500 Jefferson St. 42°29′42″N 92°20′30″W	Waterloo	
28	John N. and Mary McQuilken House	John N. and Mary McQuilken House	September 8, 1994 (#94001097)	602 Commercial St. 42°18′46″N 92°11′35″W	La Porte City	
29	Overland Waterloo Company Building	Overland Waterloo Company Building	September 22, 2014 (#14000663)	500 E. 4th St. 42°30′02″N 92°19′58″W	Waterloo	
30	Rath Packing Company Administration Building	Rath Packing Company Administration Building	December 10, 2008 (#08001162)	1515 E. Sycamore St., 208-212 Elm St. 42°29′33″N 92°19′26″W	Waterloo	
31	Roosevelt Elementary School	Roosevelt Elementary School	December 30, 2004 (#04001402)	200 E. Arlington St. 42°31′06″N 92°20′11″W	Waterloo	
32	Round Barn, Washington Township	Round Barn, Washington Township	June 30, 1986 (#86001417)	Off U.S. Route 218; 42°35′07″N 92°27′40″W	Washington Township	
33	C.A. Rownd Round Barn	C.A. Rownd Round Barn	November 19, 1986 (#86003193)	5102 S. Main; 42°29′50″N 92°27′47″W	Cedar Falls	
34	Rensselaer Russell House	Rensselaer Russell House	July 5, 1973 (#73000722)	520 W. 3rd St. 42°29′39″N 92°20′44″W	Waterloo	
35	Snowden House	Snowden House	September 14, 1977 (#77000498)	306 Washington St. 42°29′39″N 92°20′44″W	Waterloo	
36	Syndicate Block	Syndicate Block	December 21, 2005 (#05001429)	206, 208, 210, 212, and 216 Main St. 42°18′54″N 92°11′24″W	La Porte City	
37	Walnut Street Baptist Church	Walnut Street Baptist Church	August 16, 2000 (#00000983)	415 Walnut St. 42°30′09″N 92°20′02″W	Waterloo	
38	Walnut Street Historic District	Walnut Street Historic District	September 23, 2019 (#100004414)	Franklin St., E. 4th St., Argyle St., and E. 2nd St. 42°30′10″N 92°20′04″W	Waterloo	
39	Dr. Jesse Wasson Building	Dr. Jesse Wasson Building	October 7, 1999 (#99001239)	201 Main St. 42°18′54″N 92°11′34″W	La Porte City	
40	William Waterfield House	William Waterfield House	October 19, 1978 (#78001206)	308 3rd St., S. 42°27′54″N 92°13′11″W	Raymond	
41	Waterloo East Commercial Historic District	Waterloo East Commercial Historic District	November 18, 2011 (#11000813)	128-329 E. 4th, 612-616 Mulberry, 501-632 Sycamore Sts. 42°29′56″N 92°20′06″W	Waterloo	Iowa's Main Street Commercial Architecture MPS
42	Waterloo West Commercial Historic District	Waterloo West Commercial Historic District	September 22, 2014 (#14000664)	217-333 W. 4th., 301-317 W. 5th & 612-716 Jefferson Sts. 42°29′39″N 92°20′26″W	Waterloo	
43	Waterloo Masonic Temple	Waterloo Masonic Temple	December 18, 2013 (#13000921)	325 E. Park Avenue; 42°30′02″N 92°20′09″W	Waterloo	
44	Waterloo Public Library (West Branch)	Waterloo Public Library (West Branch)	May 23, 1983 (#83000342)	528 W. 4th St. 42°29′33″N 92°20′35″W	Waterloo	
45	Waterloo Public Library-East Side Branch	Waterloo Public Library-East Side Branch	November 29, 1988 (#88001323)	626 Mulberry St. 42°29′56″N 92°19′59″W	Waterloo	
46	Henry Weis House	Henry Weis House	October 30, 1989 (#89001779)	800 W. 4th St. 42°29′26″N 92°20′45″W	Waterloo	
47	Whittier School	Whittier School	December 30, 2004 (#04001400)	1500 3rd St., W. 42°29′14″N 92°21′22″W	Waterloo	
48	Wild Historic District		October 23, 2019 (#100004546)	423, 501 & 509 W. 1st St. 42°32′16″N 92°27′03″W	Cedar Falls	
49	Daniel and Margaret Wild House	Daniel and Margaret Wild House	June 19, 2017 (#100001214)	501 W. 1st St. 42°32′17″N 92°27′04″W	Cedar Falls	
50	YMCA Building	YMCA Building	July 7, 1983 (#83000343)	154 W. 4th St. 42°29′37″N 92°20′27″W	Waterloo	

== Former listings ==
	Name on the Register	Image	Date listed	Date removed	Location	City or town	Description
1	Central Hall		January 18, 1984 (#84001204)	May 8, 2002	University of Northern Iowa campus	Cedar Falls	Demolished in September, 1984.
2	Crane Creek Bridge		June 25, 1998 (#98000769)	November 3, 2003	Marquis Rd. over Crane Creek	Waterloo vicinity	Demolished in July 2003.
3	Fields Barn		September 19, 1977 (#77000495)	May 12, 2009	Southwest of Cedar Falls; 42°29′00″N 92°29′10″W	Cedar Falls	Demolished on December 16, 2008
4	Forrest Milling Company Oatmeal Mill		June 24, 1980 (#80001430)	September 10, 2008	North Main Street; 42°29′00″N 92°29′10″W	Cedar Falls	Demolished February 9, 2008.
5	James Newell Barn		December 12, 1976 (#76000734)	September 8, 2008	North of Cedar Falls off U.S. Route 218; 42°37′01″N 92°29′38″W	Cedar Falls	

== See also ==
- List of National Historic Landmarks in Iowa
- National Register of Historic Places listings in Iowa
- Listings in neighboring counties: Benton, Bremer, Buchanan, Butler, Fayette, Grundy, Tama
