= Grace Methodist Episcopal Church =

Grace Methodist Episcopal Church may refer to: (sorted by state, then city/town)

- Grace United Methodist Church (Wilmington, Delaware), listed on the National Register of Historic Places (NRHP) in Wilmington, Delaware
- Grace Methodist Episcopal Church (Waterloo, Iowa), listed on the National Register of Historic Places (NRHP) in Black Hawk County
- Grace Methodist Episcopal Church (Wichita, Kansas), listed on the NRHP in Sedgwick County
- Grace Methodist Episcopal Church (Winfield, Kansas), listed on the NRHP in Cowley County
- Grace Methodist Episcopal Church (Newport, Kentucky)
- Grace Methodist Episcopal Church (Petoskey, Michigan), listed on the NRHP in Emmet County
- Grace Methodist Episcopal Church, Harrisburg, PA., the first church in the United States to use electric lights
- Grace Methodist Episcopal Church (Dallas, Texas), listed on the NRHP in Dallas County

== See also ==
- Methodist Episcopal Church
