= Round Barn, Washington Township =

Round Barn, Washington Township may refer to:

- Round Barn, Washington Township (Janesville, Iowa), listed on the National Register of Historic Places in Black Hawk County, Iowa
- Round Barn, Washington Township (Sciola, Iowa), listed on the National Register of Historic Places in Montgomery County, Iowa
