= Walnut Street Baptist Church =

Walnut Street Baptist Church may refer to:

- Walnut Street Baptist Church (Waterloo, Iowa), listed on the National Register of Historic Places in Iowa
- Walnut Street Baptist Church (Louisville, Kentucky)
