= Syndicate Block =

Syndicate Block may refer to:

- Syndicate Block (Des Moines, Iowa), listed on the National Register of Historic Places in Polk County, Iowa
- Syndicate Block (La Porte City, Iowa), listed on the National Register of Historic Places in Black Hawk County, Iowa
