= LaPorte City Town Hall and Fire Station =

- LaPorte City City Town Hall and Fire Station
- U.S. National Register of Historic Places
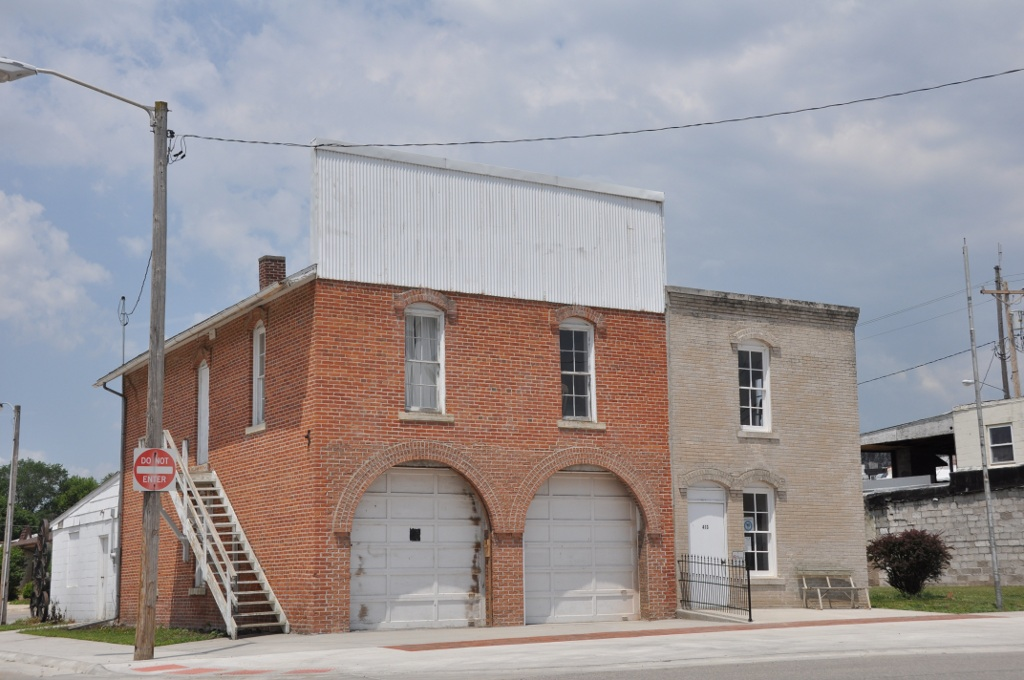

- Location within Iowa Location within the United States
- Location: 413 Chestnut; La Porte City, Iowa
- Coordinates: 42°18′55.1″N 92°11′33.2″W
- Area: less than one acre
- Built: 1876, 1911
- NRHP reference No.: 77000496
- Added to NRHP: May 12, 1977

The LaPorte City Town Hall and Fire Station is a historic building located in La Porte City, Iowa, United States. The town hall/fire station portion of the buildings was completed in 1876, five years after the town was organized. The two-story, brick structure has a gable roof hidden behind a metal false front. A two-story brick addition was built onto the north side of the building in 1911 for a town jail. The fire station was housed on the main floor of the original building where the two round-arch doorways are located. The doorways were altered in 1950 to accommodate larger fire vehicles. A single story concrete block addition was built at the same time. The fire department operated from here until 1968, and the large doorways were restored to their original arched form in the 1970s. The second floor of the original building was utilized as the town hall until the 1930s when it moved to the former La Porte City Station. The space was rented to the local high school for classrooms until 1974. After the fire department moved out the building the FFA Agricultural Museum began to occupy part of the building, until it eventually occupied the whole facility. The building was listed on the National Register of Historic Places in 1977. The museum moved to another building on Main Street in 2001.
