= Waterloo West =

Waterloo West could refer to:

- Waterloo West, New Zealand, a statistical area of Waterloo, New Zealand, itself a suburb of the city of Lower Hutt
- Waterloo West High School, in Waterloo, Iowa, U.S.
- Waterloo West Commercial Historic District, in Waterloo, Iowa, U.S.
