= John N. and Mary McQuilken House =

Historic house in Iowa, United States

- U.S. National Register of Historic Places
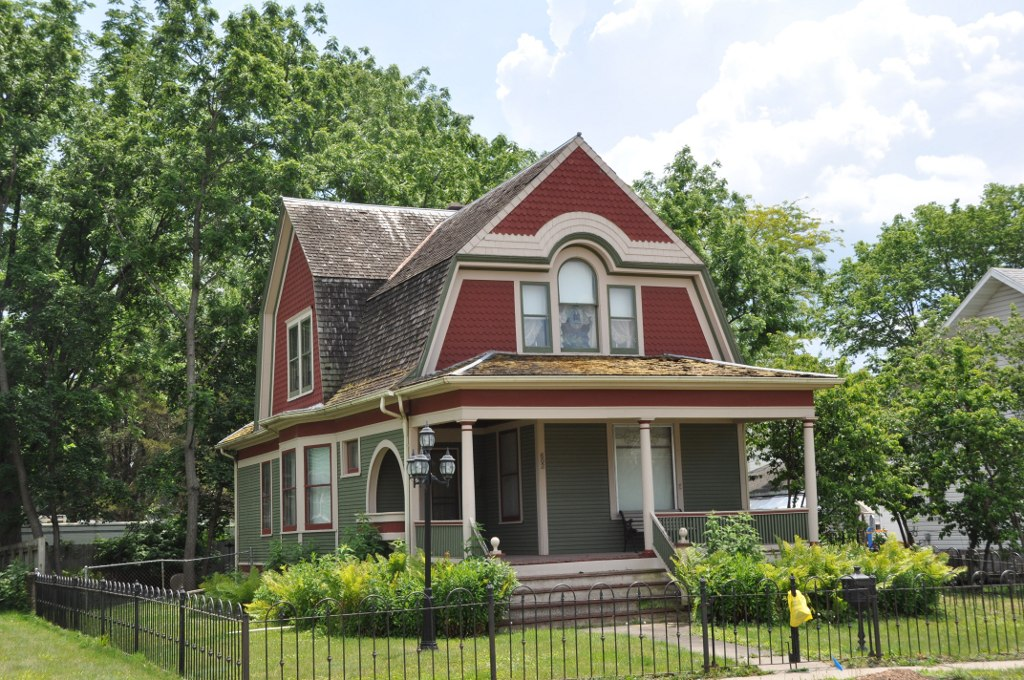

- Location within Iowa Location within the United States
- Location: 602 Commercial St. La Porte City, Iowa
- Coordinates: 42°18′46.9″N 92°11′35.4″W
- Area: less than one acre
- Built: 1901
- Architectural style: Late 19th and 20th Century Revivals
- NRHP reference No.: 94001097
- Added to NRHP: September 8, 1994

The John N. and Mary McQuilken House, also known as the Emelia J. Schleeser House and the Joan E. Schreiber House, is a historic building located in La Porte City, Iowa, United States. McQuilken was a meat and poultry merchant, and then an insurance salesman. He and his wife Mary had no children. Built from 1900 to 1901, the house's architect and builder are unknown. It features Colonial Revival influences in its complex gambrel roof system and inset porch. Around 1960 the second floor was converted into an apartment. A renovation in the mid-1980s returned the house as much as possible to its original form. It was listed on the National Register of Historic Places in 1994.
