= Chapple and Young Block =

- U.S. National Register of Historic Places
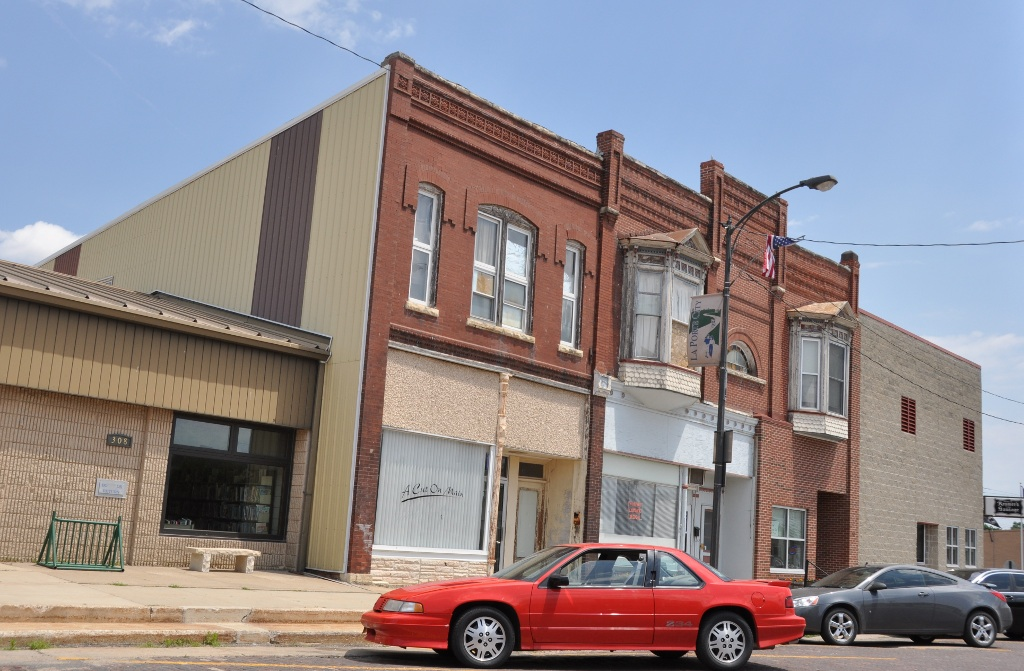

- Location within Iowa Location within the United States
- Location: 316-318-320 Main St. La Porte City, Iowa
- Coordinates: 42°18′52.9″N 92°11′28.4″W
- Area: less than one acre
- Built: 1892, 1896
- Architectural style: Romanesque Revival
- NRHP reference No.: 02001025
- Added to NRHP: September 20, 2002

The Chapple and Young Block is a historic building located in La Porte City, Iowa, United States. William Chapple and Clayton E. Young pooled their resources and built this commercial block. The first floor was completed in 1892 and the second floor in 1896. It was a period of economic expansion in the community. There was a single-story section attached to 318 Main Street that was a non-contributing part of this nomination, but has subsequently been torn down and replaced. The two-story brick structures is an example of the commercial Romanesque Revival style. Brick pilasters divide the main façade into three bays, two of which feature an oriel window. A cornice of decorative brickwork is also divided into three sections with a taller center section. The cornice level is at the same level with the neighboring building at 314 Main Street as the Chapple and Young Block was designed to be compatible with the older building. It was listed on the National Register of Historic Places in 2002.
