= August H.J. and Justena Lange Farmstead Historic District =

Historic district in Iowa, United States

- U.S. National Register of Historic Places
- U.S. Historic district
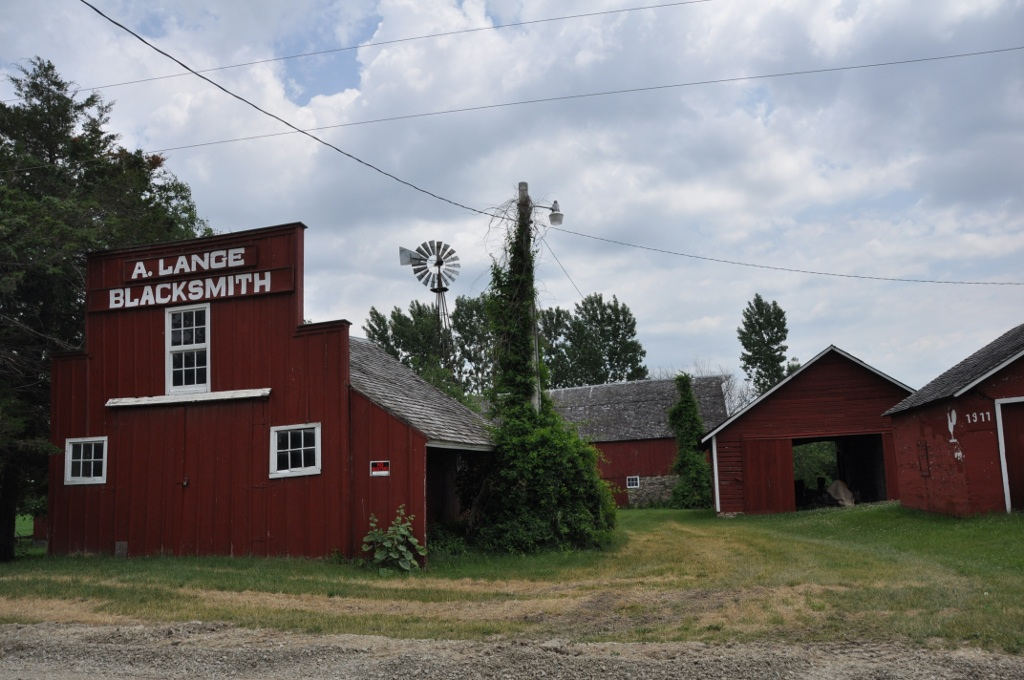

- Location within Iowa Location within the United States
- Location: 8214 Spring Creek Rd.
- Nearest city: La Porte City, Iowa
- Coordinates: 42°22′53″N 92°04′28.9″W
- Area: 2 acres (0.81 ha)
- Built by: August H.J. Lange
- NRHP reference No.: 97000385
- Added to NRHP: May 14, 1997

The August H.J. and Justena Lange Farmstead Historic District is an agricultural historic district located northeast of La Porte City, Iowa, United States. It was listed on the National Register of Historic Places in 1997. At the time of its nomination it consisted of 16 resources, which included seven contributing buildings, two contributing structures, one contributing objects, three non-contributing buildings, and three non-contributing structures. The farmstead was developed from 1887, when the Lange's took possession of the property, and 1916 when they moved into La Porte City. They had a general farming operation here that was augmented by August's specialized skill as a blacksmith. The farmstead was organized spatially with the domestic buildings on the west side of Spring Creek Road and the farming operation on the east side.

The contributing buildings include the Shimer-Boehringer-Lange Cottage, which is composed of three sections. The original part of the house Is the Shriner cottage that was built on this property sometime before 1887. The Lange's moved in when they bought the property and raised their seven children here. The Boehringer cottage was added around 1900 after Conrad and Johanna Boehringer, Justena's parents, died. Other contributing buildings include the barn (c. 1900), blacksmith shop (c. 1900), smokehouse (1908), chicken house (1911), milk house (c. 1912), and a shed (c. 1912). The windbreak around the domestic area was planted by Lange around 1900, and is one of the contributing structures as is Spring Creek Road and the farmyard drive which are counted together. A concrete planter built by Lange in 1917 in La Porte City and relocated here in 1986 when the house was torn down is the contributing object.
