= Dr. Jesse Wasson Building =

- U.S. National Register of Historic Places
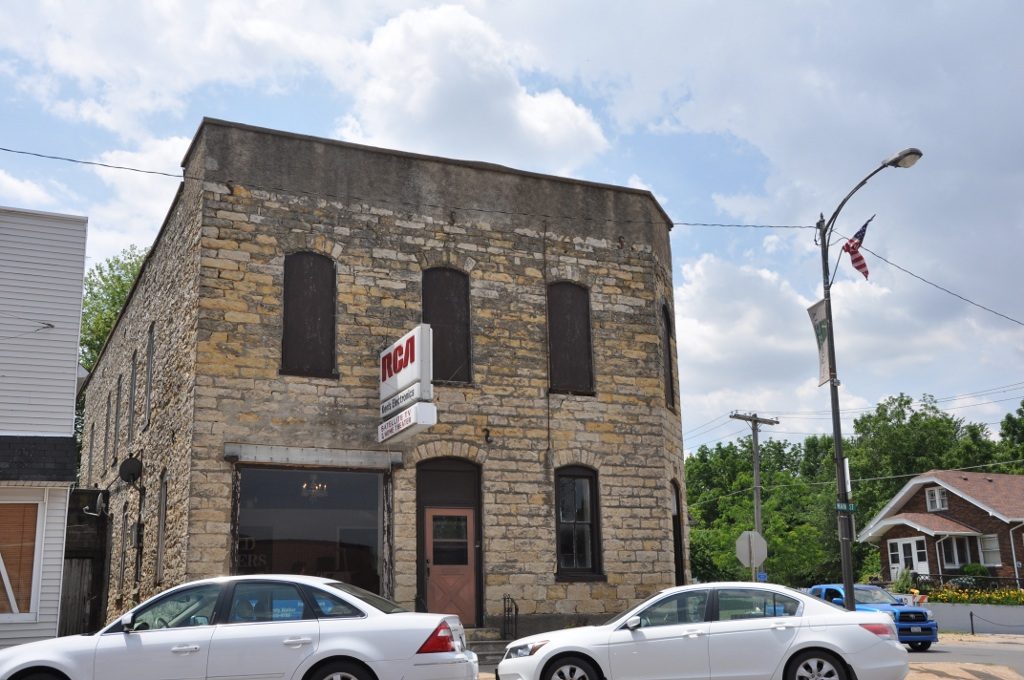

- Location within Iowa Location within the United States
- Location: 201 Main St. La Porte City, Iowa
- Coordinates: 42°18′54.1″N 92°11′34.6″W
- Area: less than one acre
- Built: 1878
- Architectural style: Late Victorian
- NRHP reference No.: 99001239
- Added to NRHP: October 7, 1999

The Dr. Jesse Wasson Building, also known as the Knights of Pythias Lodge and the K. P. Building, is a historic building located in La Porte City, Iowa, United States. The late Victorian structure is the oldest surviving example of stone construction and the only extant first generation commercial building in La Porte City. It was built by Dr. Jesse Wasson for his office. Wasson founded the town and served it as postmaster, physician, newspaper publisher and editor, mayor, and its primary booster. He also served on the Black Hawk County Board of Supervisors and in the Iowa Legislature. The two-story native limestone structure features a unified canted entry. It has two symmetrical primary façades that face both Main and locust Streets. Both facades have a centered entry. The various owners of the building include the local Knights of Pythias lodge who used it for their purposes from 1914 to 1961. It was listed on the National Register of Historic Places in 1999.
