= James Newell Barn =

- Formerly listed on the U.S. National Register of Historic Places
- Location within Iowa Location within the United States
- Location: North of Cedar Falls off U.S. Route 218
- Coordinates: 42°37′01″N 92°29′38″W
- Area: less than one acre
- Built: 1859
- NRHP reference No.: 76000734

Significant dates
- Added to NRHP: December 12, 1976
- Removed from NRHP: September 8, 2022

The James Newell Barn was a historic building located north of Cedar Falls, Iowa, United States. Newell was the first settler in Washington Township. The Ohio native settled here in 1845 from Louisa County, Iowa. The area is called Turkey Foot Forks, named by Native Americans because the confluence of the Shell Rock River and the Cedar River looks like the foot of a wild turkey. The two-story structure with a gable roof was built on a native limestone foundation. Black walnut timber from the property was used in the construction. It was listed on the National Register of Historic Places in 1976. It was removed in 2022.
