= William Waterfield House =

Historic house in Iowa, United States

- U.S. National Register of Historic Places
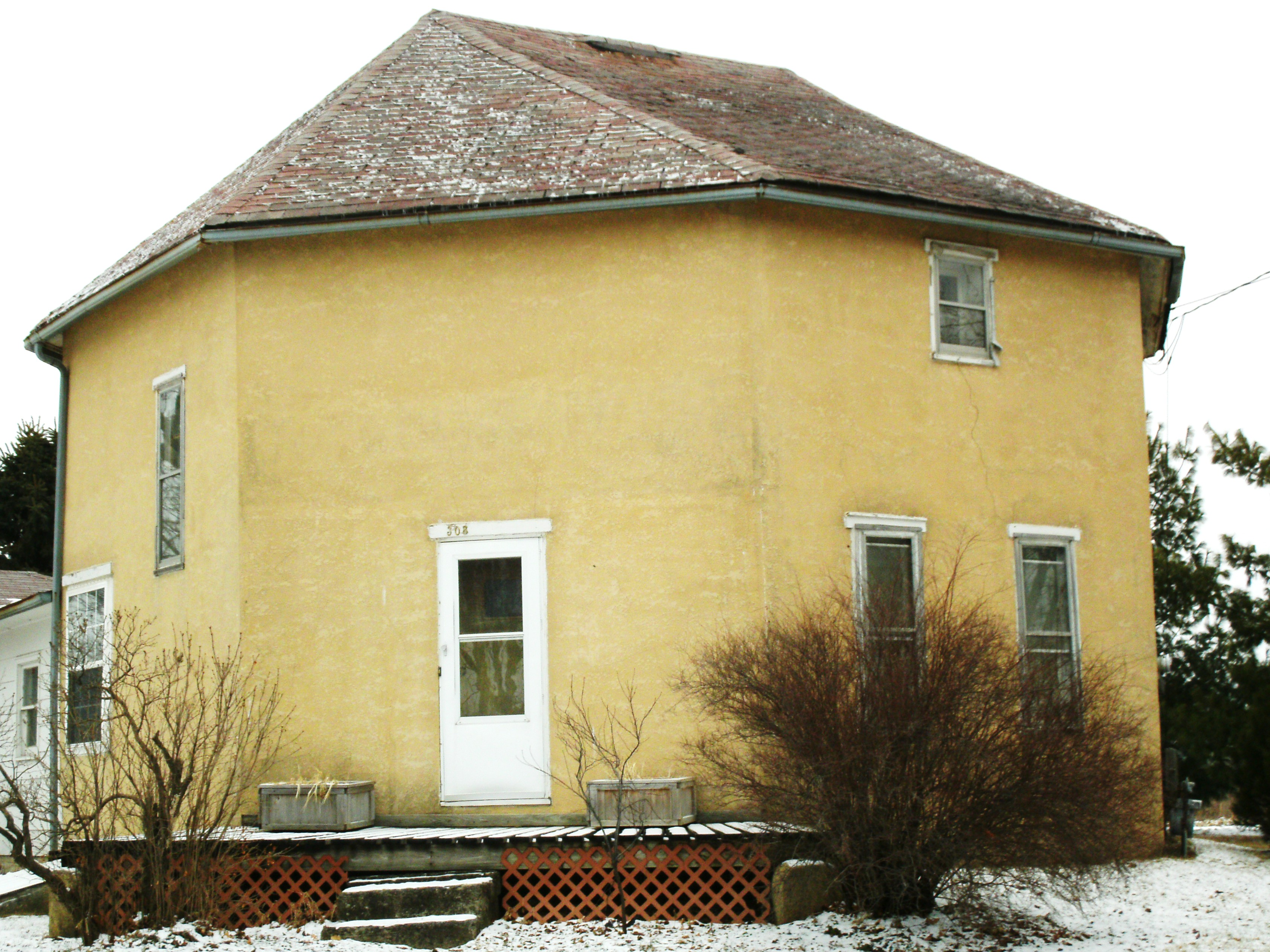

- Location within Iowa Location within the United States
- Location: 308 3rd St., S. Raymond, Iowa
- Coordinates: 42°27′54″N 92°13′11″W
- Area: approximately 1 acre (0.40 ha)
- Built: 1867
- Architect: Waterfield, William
- Architectural style: Octagon Mode
- NRHP reference No.: 78001206
- Added to NRHP: October 19, 1978

The William Waterfield House, also known as the Waterfield Octagon House, is a historic building located in Raymond, Iowa, United States. Built in 1867, it was added to the National Register of Historic Places on October 19, 1978. Waterfield was a New Jersey native who settled in Iowa in 1856 as a farmer, eventually operating a hotel in Raymond, possibly in this house. He was a student of phrenology and as a result he built this octagon house. Its 2-foot (0.61 m) thick walls are covered with stucco, which hides its exterior of ashlar limestone. The house is capped with an unusual hipped roof that is formed by extending its east and west roof planes.
