= La Porte City Station =

- U.S. National Register of Historic Places
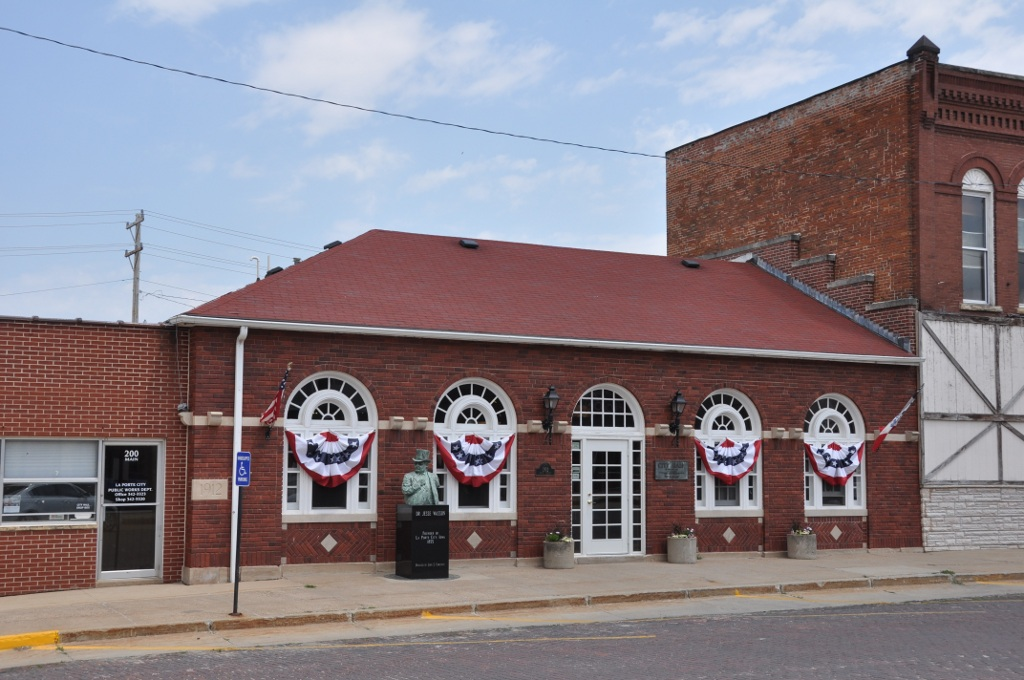

- Location within Iowa Location within the United States
- Location: 202 Main St. La Porte City, Iowa
- Coordinates: 42°18′55.1″N 92°11′33.2″W
- Area: less than one acre
- Built: 1912
- Architect: Waterloo, Cedar Falls & Northern
- NRHP reference No.: 79003781
- Added to NRHP: March 13, 1979

The La Porte City Station, also known as the La Porte City Hall, is a historic building located in La Porte City, Iowa, United States. It was built as a depot for the Waterloo, Cedar Falls & Northern Railroad, an interurban system. The system began in 1885 as the Waterloo Street Railway Co., and grew to include routes to Cedar Falls (1897), Denver, Iowa (1901), and Waverly (1906). In 1912 it was expanded to Cedar Rapids, and this building was constructed at that time. It is a single-story, brick, Georgian Revival structure. It served as a depot until 1928, when it was replaced by a new building that was more freight focused rather than passenger focused as this depot was. This building was acquired by La Porte City at that time for use as a city hall. The community's public library was organized in 1945, and it was located here as well. The building was listed on the National Register of Historic Places in 1979. The library has subsequently been moved to a different building on Main Street.
