= Snowden House =

Historic house in Iowa, United States

- U.S. National Register of Historic Places
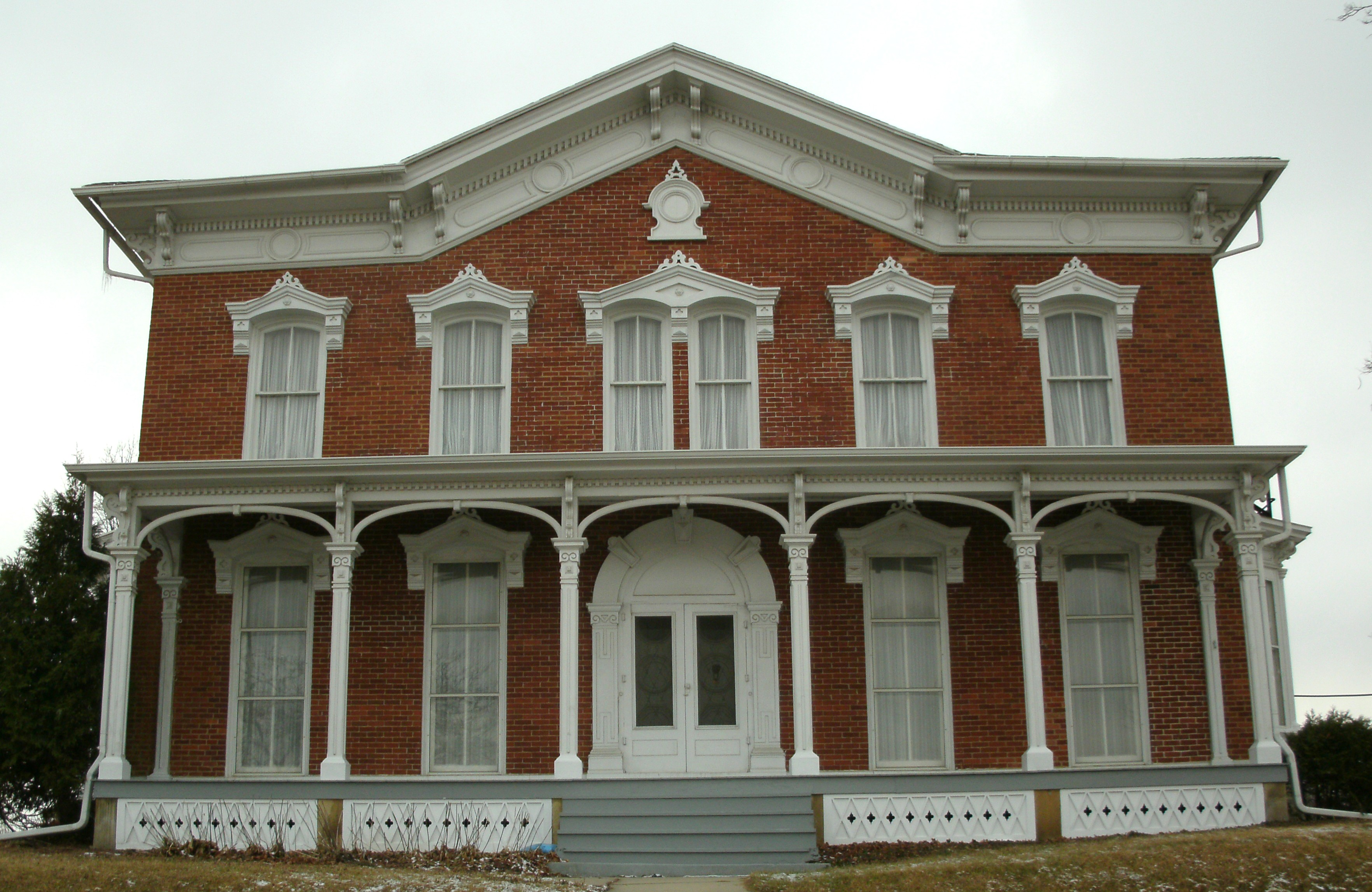

- Location within Iowa Location within the United States
- Location: 306 Washington St. Waterloo, Iowa
- Coordinates: 42°29′39.5″N 92°20′45.3″W
- Area: Under one acre
- Built: 1878
- Architectural style: Italianate
- NRHP reference No.: 77000498
- Added to NRHP: September 14, 1977

The Snowden House is a building in Waterloo, Iowa, United States. Local pharmacist William Snowden had it built in 1878 and it began housing the Waterloo Women's Club in 1922.

Snowden House is a two-storey brick rectangular Italianate architecture structure, featuring a hip roof, shallow gable with a blind oculus on the main facade, bracketed eaves and full-length front porch. It has segmentally arched windows throughout, with hood moulds capping those on the front. The back wing is a later addition and the interior was completely rebuilt after a 1955 fire.

The house was listed in the National Register of Historic Places in 1977.
