= Black Hawk Hotel =

- U.S. National Register of Historic Places
- U.S. Historic district – Contributing property
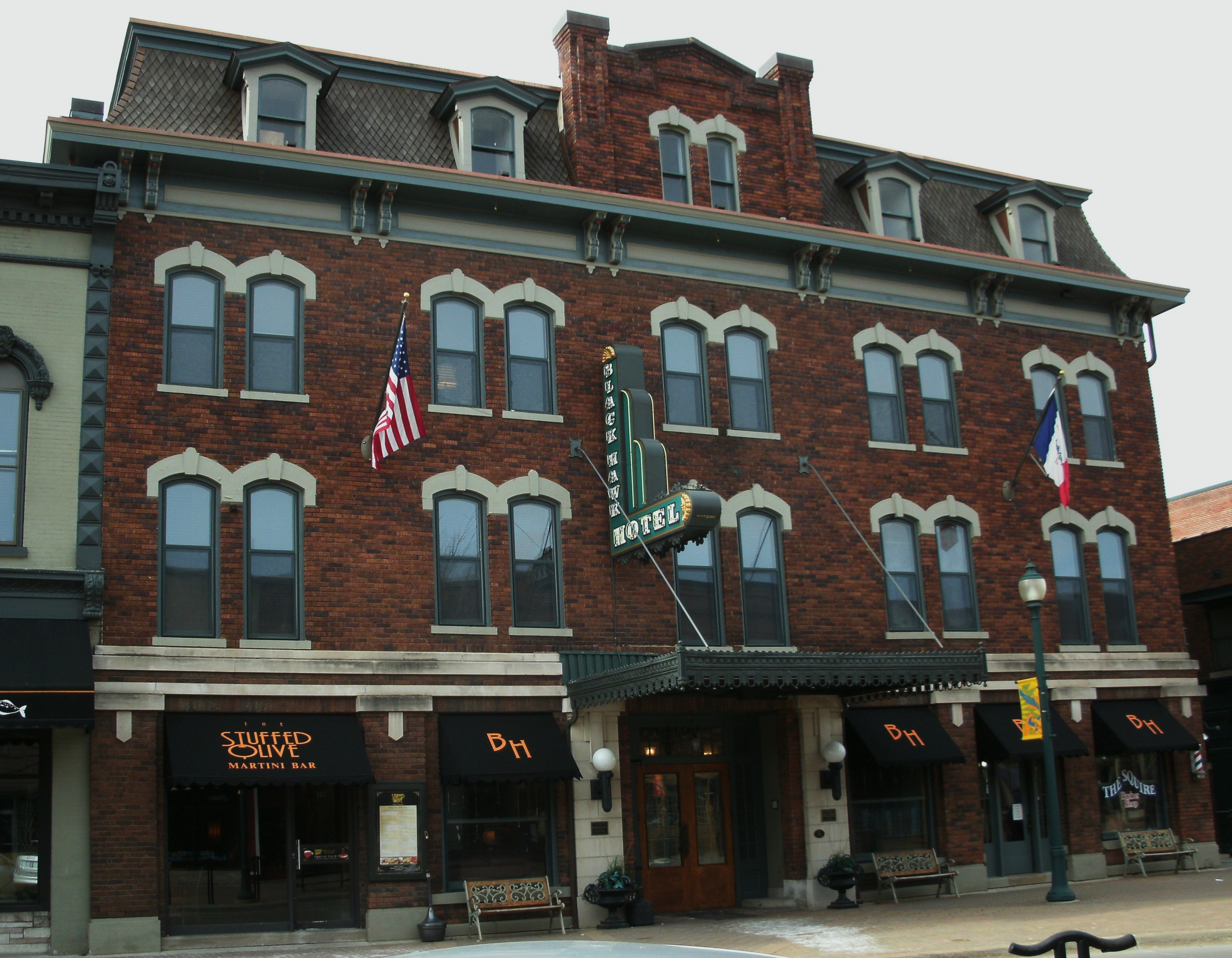

- Location within Iowa Location within the United States
- Location: 115-119 Main St. Cedar Falls, Iowa
- Coordinates: 42°32′15″N 92°26′44″W
- Area: less than one acre
- Built: 1915 (renovation)
- Architect: John G. Ralston (renovation)
- Architectural style: Second Empire; Late 19th & early 20th Century American Movements
- Part of: Cedar Falls Downtown Historic District (ID100001673)
- NRHP reference No.: 02001542
- Added to NRHP: December 19, 2002

The Black Hawk Hotel is an historic building located in downtown Cedar Falls, Iowa, United States. It was individually listed on the National Register of Historic Places in 2002. In 2017 it was included as a contributing property in the Cedar Falls Downtown Historic District.

== History ==
A hotel has occupied the same site in Cedar Falls since the early 1850s. The hotels have occupied two different buildings and had several names over the years. The Winslow House was a wood frame stagecoach hotel that was built c. 1853. It was renamed the Western in 1858, and an additional floor was added to the building. In the 1860s the hotel was renamed the Carter House.

In the late 1870s, the present Second Empire building was built and named the Davis House. The ownership of the hotel transferred to the Burr family in 1885 and it was renamed Burr's Hotel.

Waterloo architect John G. Ralston was hired by a group of investors in 1914 to redesign the hotel building. The renovation made the structure a combination of the Second Empire and Mission styles. It was at this time that the hotel was named the Blackhawk.

The hotel's bar, The Stuffed Olive, closed on January 1st, 2019 but later reopened in September 2019 as its own establishment across the street.
