= Daniel and Margaret Wild House =

Historic house in Iowa, United States

- U.S. National Register of Historic Places
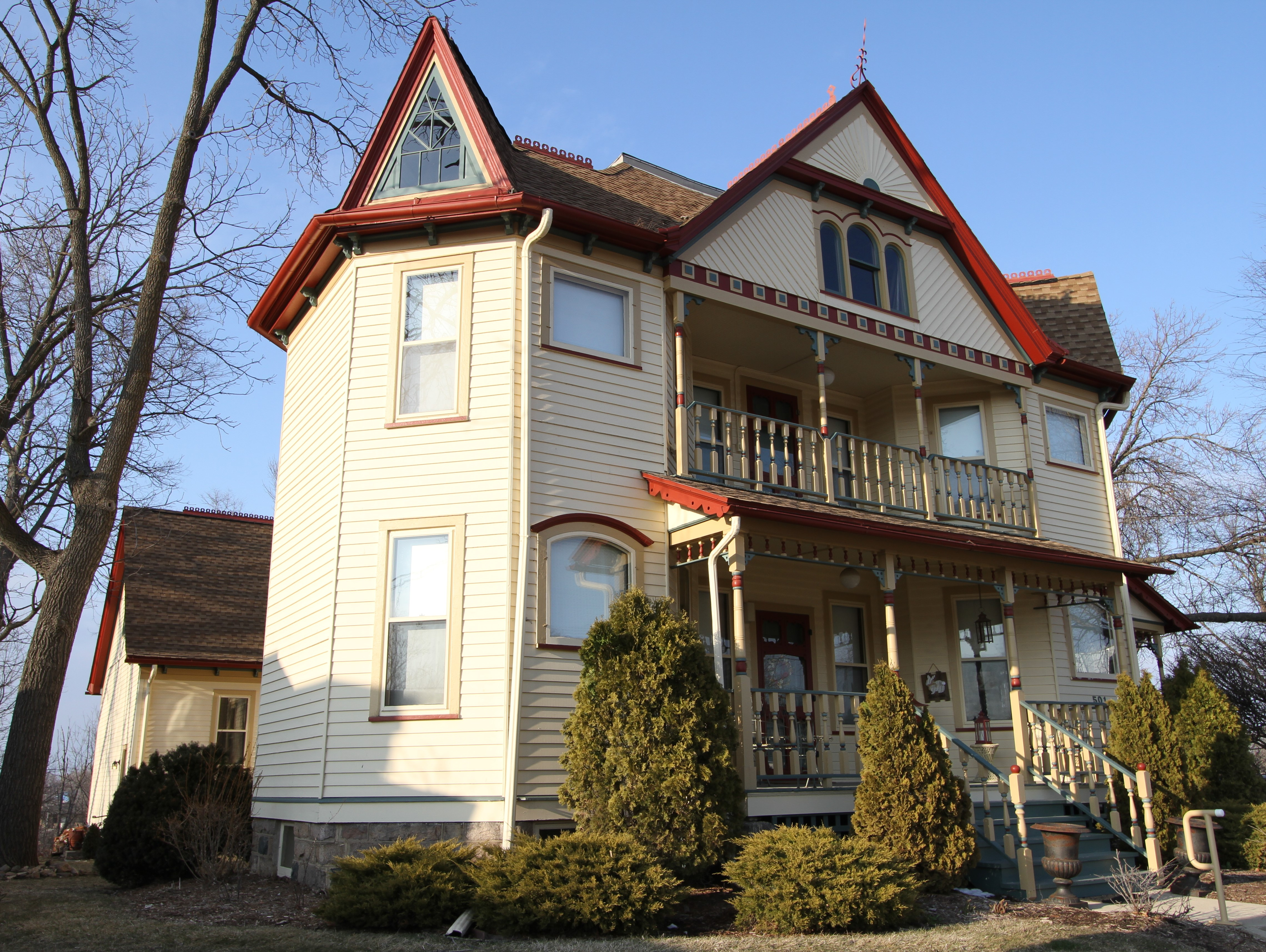

- Location within Iowa Location within the United States
- Location: 501 W. 1st St. Cedar Falls, Iowa
- Coordinates: 42°32′17.1″N 92°27′3.9″W
- Area: less than one acre
- Built: 1895
- Architect: William A. Robinson
- Architectural style: Queen Anne
- NRHP reference No.: 10000048
- Added to NRHP: June 19, 2017

The Daniel and Margaret Wild House is a historic building located in Cedar Falls, Iowa, United States. Designed by William A. Robinson, the two-story frame Queen Anne was completed in 1895. It features a rooftop porch turret, pink granite foundation, and the use of exotic woods such as circassian walnut and Georgia curly pine. The house was built for Daniel and Margaret Wild and their family. Daniel Wild was a German immigrant who settled in Cedar Falls in 1853, the same year he married Margaret. He owned a brick company by 1868 and then expanded into lumber, coal, farming and rest estate. The house was listed on the National Register of Historic Places in 2017.
