= Cedar Falls Downtown Historic District =

Historic district in Iowa, United States

- Cedar Falls Historic District
- U.S. National Register of Historic Places
- U.S. Historic district
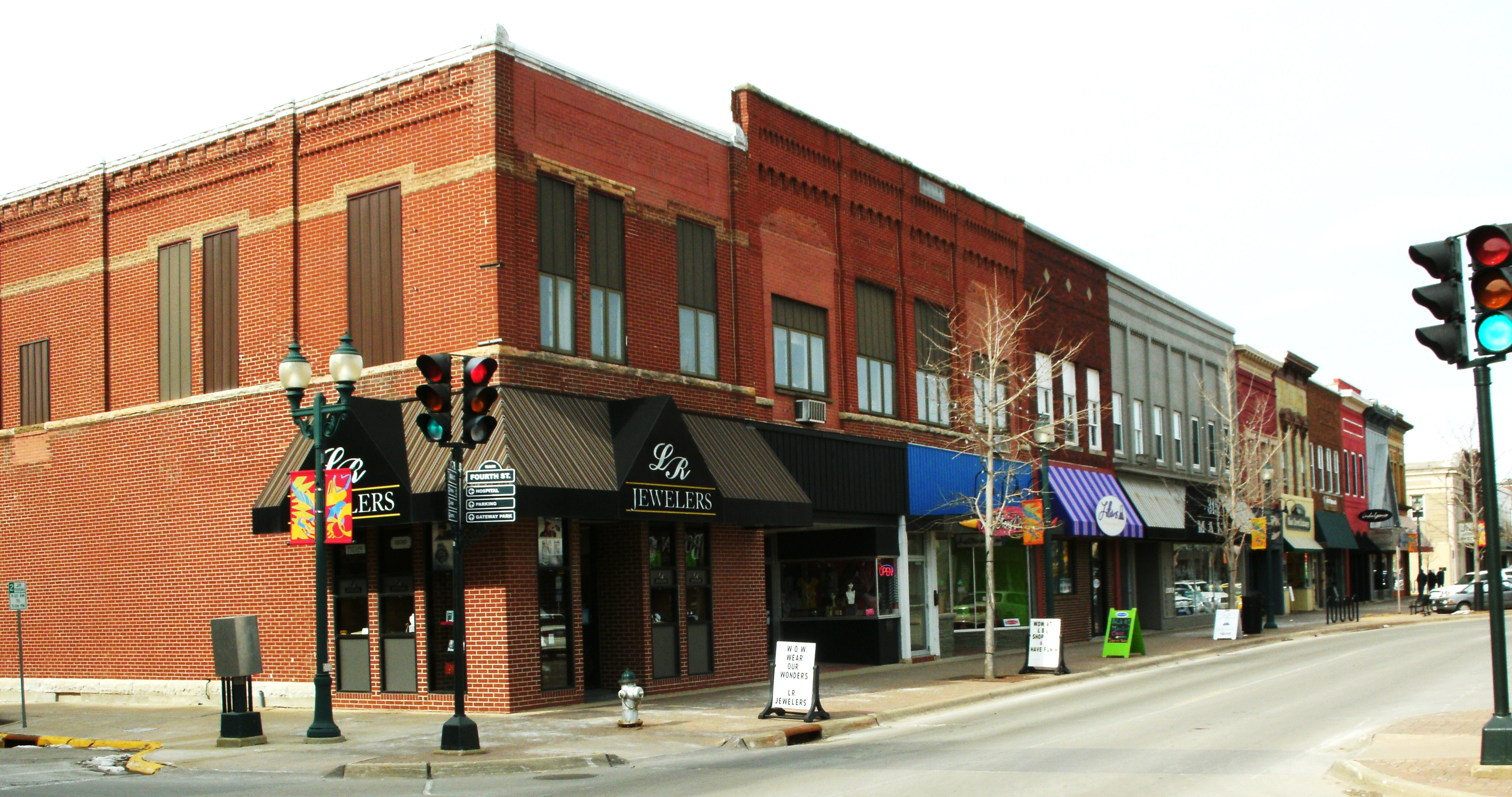
- Looking north on Main St. from E. 4th St.

- Location within Iowa Location within the United States
- Location: 102-422 Main, 100 blk. E. & W. 2nd, 100 blk. E. & W. 3rd, 100 blk. E. 4th Sts., Cedar Falls, Iowa
- Coordinates: 42°32′10″N 92°26′44″W
- NRHP reference No.: 100001673
- Added to NRHP: October 2, 2017

The Cedar Falls Historic District is a nationally recognized historic district located in Cedar Falls, Iowa, United States. It was listed on the National Register of Historic Places in 2017. It is made up of 59 buildings that were constructed between 1860 and 1960. Of those, 46 were determined to be significantly historic. Four of the buildings were individually listed on the National Register of Historic Places in previous years; they include the Black Hawk Hotel (1870), the Odd Fellows Temple (1902), and the Oster Regent Theater (1910).
