= Syndicate Block (La Porte City, Iowa) =

- U.S. National Register of Historic Places
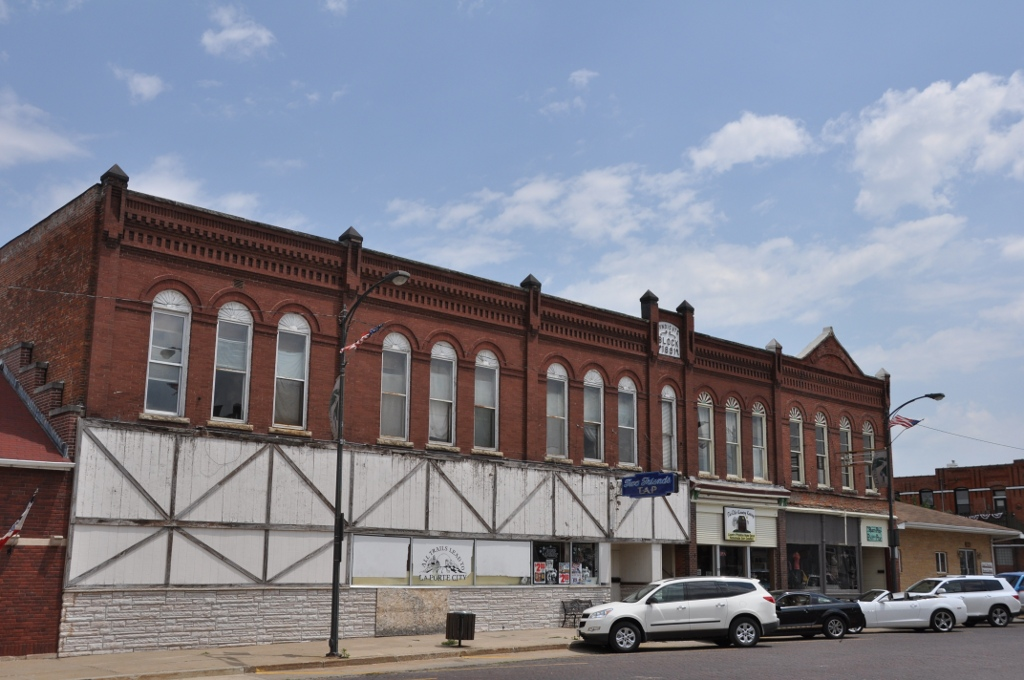

- Location within Iowa Location within the United States
- Location: 206, 208, 210, 212, and 216 Main St., La Porte City, Iowa
- Coordinates: 42°18′54.6″N 92°11′32.4″W
- Area: less than one acre
- Built: 1891, 1894
- Built by: Albert L. Day
- Architectural style: Late Victorian
- NRHP reference No.: 05001429
- Added to NRHP: December 21, 2005

The Syndicate Block is a historic building located in La Porte City, Iowa, United States. A group of real estate investors known as the La Porte Improvement Company was responsible for the construction of this commercial block. The first four sections of the block were completed in 1891, and the fifth section in 1894. It is unknown why its address in 216 Main Street as it is adjacent to 212. It is also the largest commercial building in La Porte City. The investors continued to own and manage the property until 1919. The two-story brick structure features a unified architectural design and late Victorian styling. Brick pilasters surmounted with pinnacles divide each of the units. All of the windows on the second floor are round arched windows. Decorative brickwork is found on the parapet and cornice. A common entrance to the second floor units is found between 210 and 212. The cornice at this point has a stone name plaque that reads "Syndicate/Block/1891." Above 216 is a triangular pediment. While some of the storefronts have been altered the upper floor maintains its integrity. It was listed on the National Register of Historic Places in 2005.
