= Grace Methodist Episcopal Church (Petoskey, Michigan) =

Historic church in Michigan, United States

- U.S. National Register of Historic Places
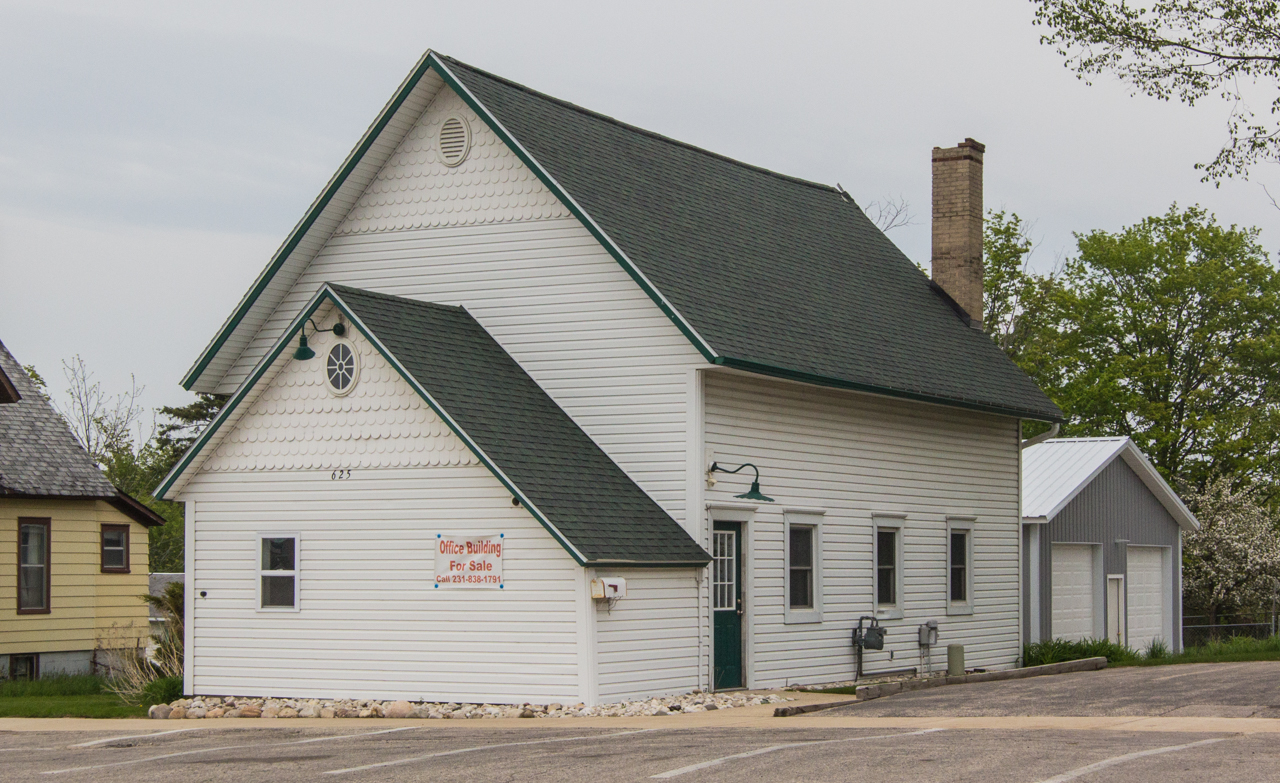

- Location within Michigan Location within the United States
- Interactive map
- Location: 625 Connable St., Petoskey, Michigan
- Coordinates: 45°22′15″N 84°58′8″W
- Area: 0.3 acres (0.12 ha)
- Built: 1903
- Architectural style: Colonial Revival
- MPS: Petoskey MRA
- NRHP reference No.: 86002012
- Added to NRHP: September 10, 1986

Grace Methodist Episcopal Church is a historic church located at 625 Connable Street in Petoskey, Michigan. It was added to the National Register of Historic Places in 1986.

The church was constructed between 1903 and 1908.

The Grace Methodist Episcopal Church is a single-story frame church building with a gabled roof. It has a projecting, gable-roof entrance vestibule in the front. The side walls contain wood-framed two-over-two windows with a simple cornice above. The gable of the entrance vestibule is clad with wood shingle, and the remainder of the walls of the building are sided with clapboard. Two small windows flank the main entrance.
