= Cedar Falls Independent Order of Odd Fellows Temple =

- Cedar Falls Independent Order of Odd Fellows
- U.S. National Register of Historic Places
- U.S. Historic district – Contributing property
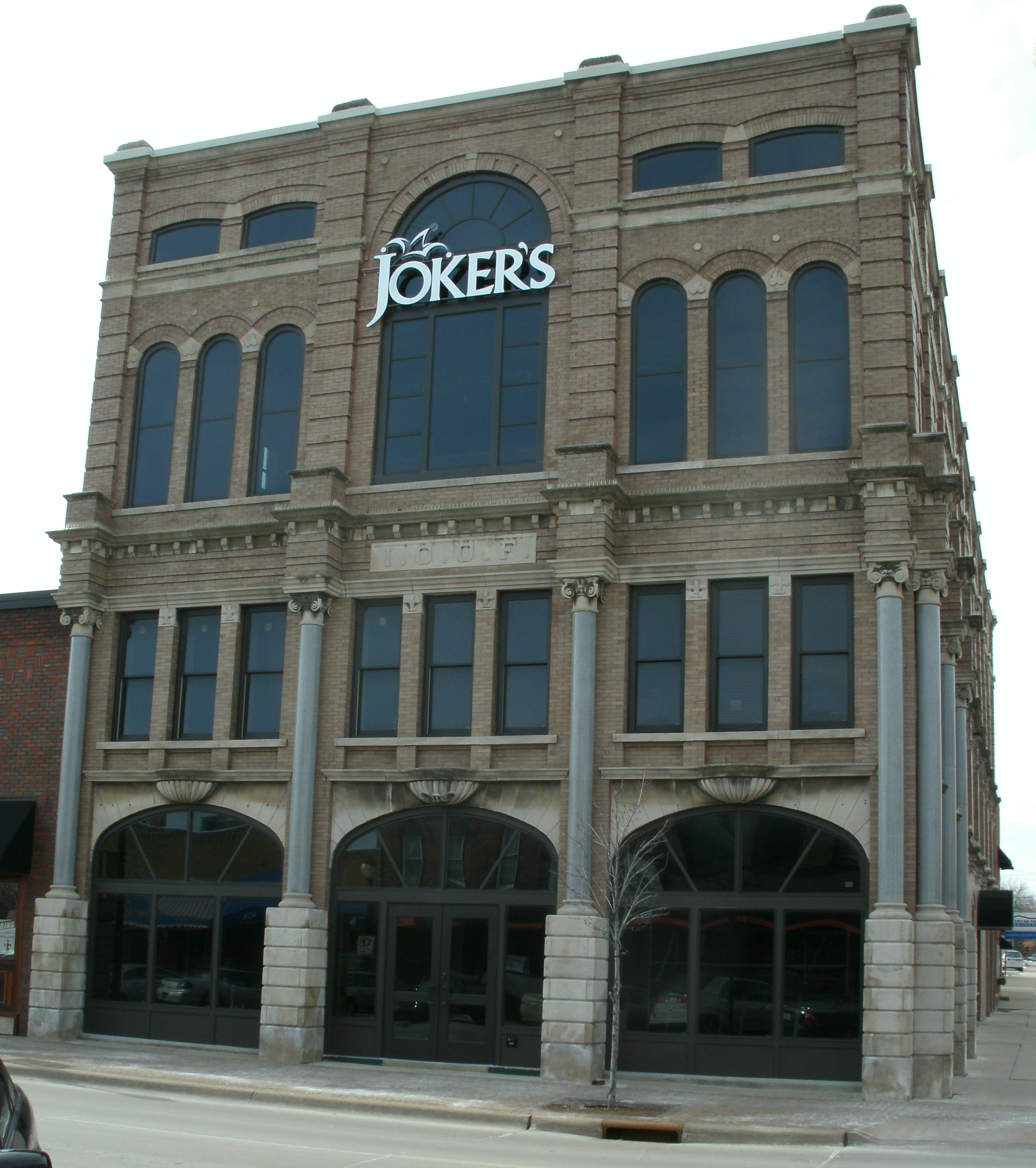

- Location within Iowa Location within the United States
- Location: 401--403 Main St. Cedar Falls, Iowa
- Coordinates: 42°32′5″N 92°26′41″W
- Area: less than one acre
- Built: 1902
- Built by: Robinson, James E.
- Architectural style: Late 19th And 20th Century Revivals
- Part of: Cedar Falls Downtown Historic District (ID100001673)
- NRHP reference No.: 97000384
- Added to NRHP: May 2, 1997

The Cedar Falls Independent Order of Odd Fellows Temple, in Cedar Falls, Iowa, also known as Odd Fellows Temple or 4th and Main Building, is an Independent Order of Odd Fellows building that was built during 1901–02. It is a 3 1/2-story building on a 46 feet (14 m) by 132 feet (40 m) base.

Its 1996 nomination to the National Register of Historic Places asserted that it is historically significant because it attests to the important role of Odd Fellows in local social history, including providing life insurance to members' widows and orphans; because of it providing an example of a fraternal-commercial building, new at time of its construction; because it demonstrates the "considerable skills" of James E. Robinson, general contractor; and as it "calls attention to the influence of late Nineteenth and early Twentieth Century revival styling on its design."

The building was individually listed on the National Register of Historic Places in 1997. In 2017 it was included as a contributing property in the Cedar Falls Downtown Historic District.
