= Walnut Street Historic District (Waterloo, Iowa) =

Historic district in Iowa, United States

- U.S. National Register of Historic Places
- U.S. Historic district
- Location within Iowa Location within the United States
- Location: Franklin St., E. 4th St., Argyle St., and E. 2nd St., Waterloo, Iowa
- Coordinates: 42°30′10″N 92°20′04″W
- Area: 30.3 acres (12.3 ha)
- Architect: Mortimer B. Cleveland; Clinton Phillip Shockley
- Architectural style: Late Victorian; Late 19th and Early 20th Century American Movement
- NRHP reference No.: 100004414
- Added to NRHP: September 23, 2019

The Walnut Street Historic District is a nationally recognized historic district located in Waterloo, Iowa, United States. It was listed on the National Register of Historic Places (NRHP) in 2019. At the time of its nomination the district consisted of 111 resources, including 91 contributing buildings and 20 non-contributing buildings. The district is largely a residential area located between the central business district and the former location of the Illinois Central Railroad round house and shops. The neighborhood was originally platted as the Railroad Addition in 1860 and as the Cooley Addition in 1865. Buildings date from c. 1880 to 1981. Single-family houses are largely wood-frame construction with a few brick. Architectural styles include Queen Anne, Italianate, Shingle, Bungalow, variations on the American Foursquare, and those in a vernacular mode. Multi-family dwellings include double houses, identical houses, and apartment buildings. There are also a few commercial buildings on East Fourth Street and two churches. Walnut Street Baptist Church (1908) is individually listed on the NRHP. Two local architects, Mortimer Cleveland and Clinton Shockley have buildings in the district.

The district is significant as an early residential neighborhood outside of the original riverfront town. It was initially a middle to upper-middle-class single-family residential neighborhood. During a period of rapid growth and industrialization in the late 19th and early 20th centuries with an influx of immigrants that required low-cost housing close to factories and streetcar routes, the neighborhood's fortunes changed. The multi-family dwellings and the commercial buildings were constructed from this time and into the mid-20th century. Urban Renewal projects in the 1960s sought to revitalize the area by widening U.S. Route 63 and removing dilapidated houses. As a result, there are several vacant lots.
