= Bennington No. 4 =

- U.S. National Register of Historic Places
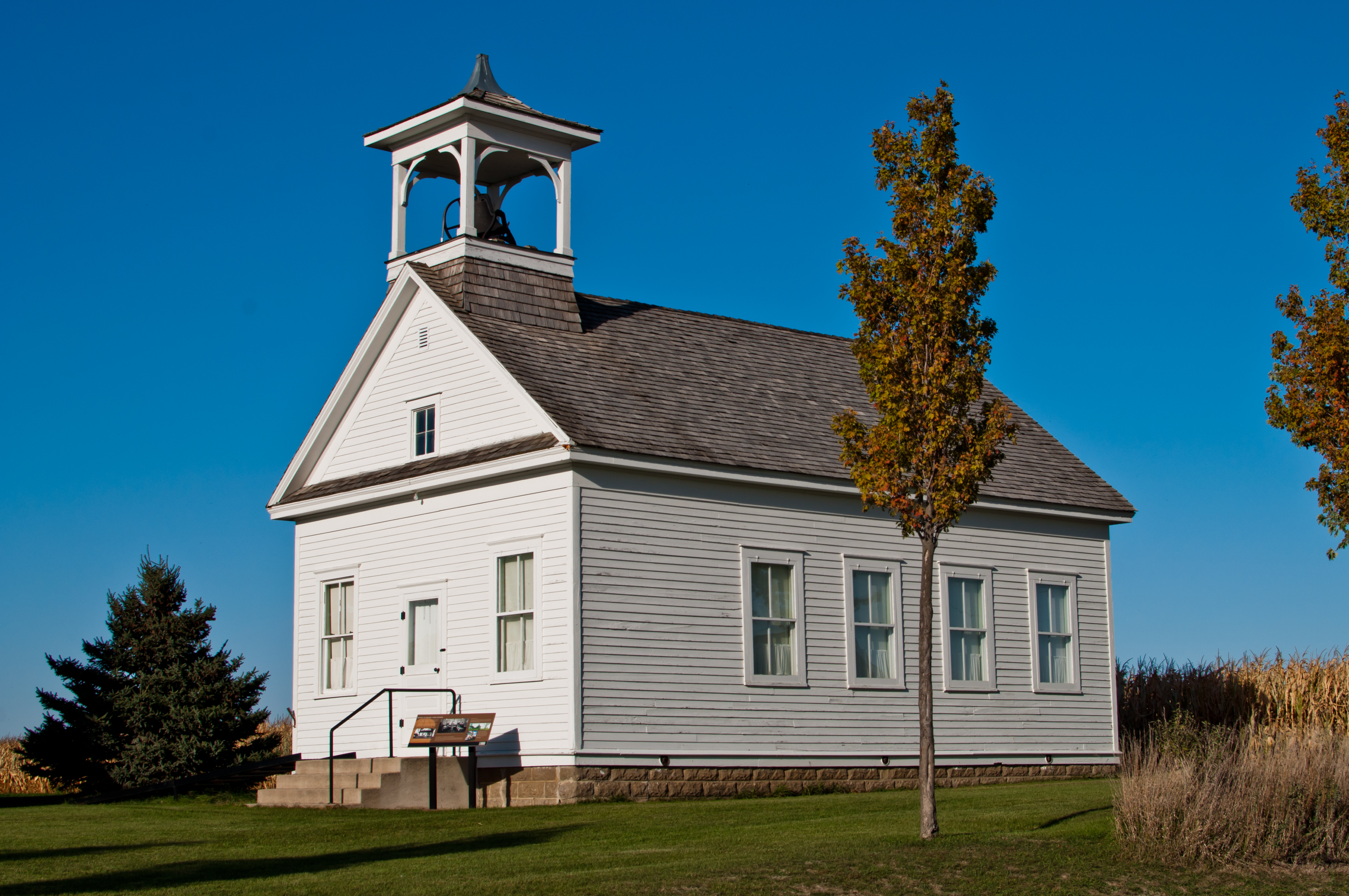

- Location within Iowa Location within the United States
- Nearest city: Waterloo, Iowa
- Coordinates: 42°35′58.9″N 92°17′50.4″W
- Area: 1 acre (0.40 ha)
- Built: 1911
- Architectural style: Late 19th And 20th Century Revivals
- NRHP reference No.: 00001651
- Added to NRHP: January 16, 2001

Bennington No. 4, also known as the Bennington School, is a one-room schoolhouse near Waterloo, Iowa. Built in 1911, it served four sections which provided as many as thirty or more students for first through eighth grades. Students in higher grades attended Waterloo East High School. The school served the predominantly German-American community until 1955 when it was closed. While it was open, the school also served as a community center for the then-existing town of Bennington. In 1958 the vacant building was sold to the local Sage family, whose members had attended and taught at the school. Restoration work took place through the 1990s.

== Description ==
The 1911 school replaced an earlier school that had existed on the site since the 1880s. By the early 20th century local farmers were prospering, and chose to build a high-quality replacement school. The school features a large belfry with a 30-gallon cast iron bell on a higher-than-usual roof. The one-story wood-frame school measures about 34.5 feet (10.5 m) deep and 22.5 feet (6.9 m) wide on a shaped stone foundation. The sole door is centered on the gabled front facade with the belfry above, flanked by two two-over-two sash windows. A cloakroom vestibule spans the front of the school on the west side, opening into the classroom. There are no windows on the north side, a concession to winter winds. Two windows on the east side and four on the south side light the room, which features a pressed tin ceiling. Walls were plastered and had beaded wood wainscoting. The plaster has been replaced by drywall and the wainscot has been preserved. The wood strip floor has been preserved.

The roof and belfry are covered with wood shingles. The belfry roof is curved, rising to a simple pinnacle, with arched brackets between the supporting columns, on a shingled platform. The west gable has a small window into the attic. Both gables have small shingled pent roofs between the eaves. A brick chimney is centered on the gable at the east end, exposed on the interior.

The Bennington school was placed on the National Register of Historic Places on January 16, 2001.
