= Overland Waterloo Company Building =

- U.S. National Register of Historic Places
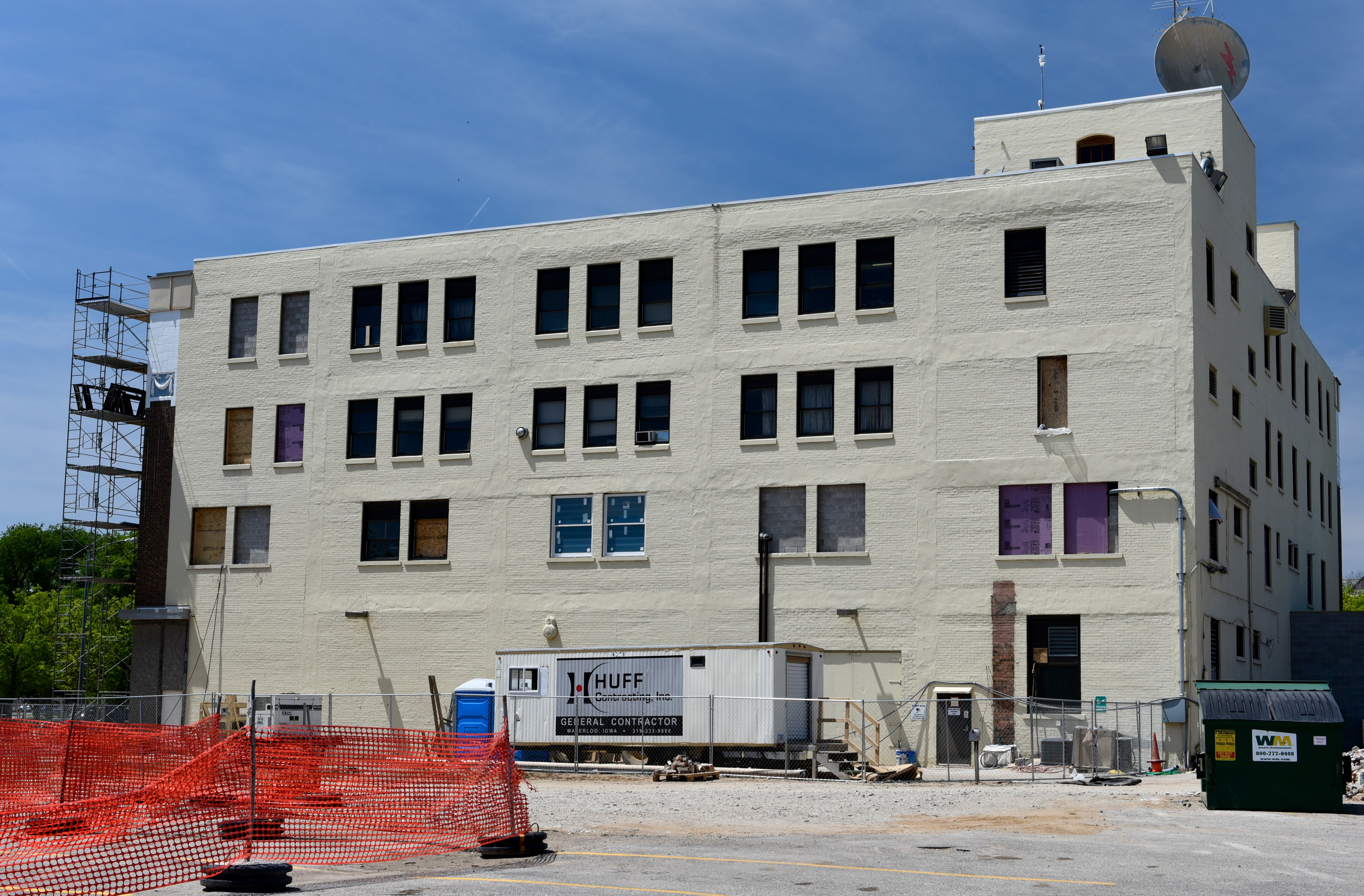
- The side and back of the building

- Location within Iowa Location within the United States
- Location: 500 E. 4th St. Waterloo, Iowa
- Coordinates: 42°03′02.3″N 92°19′57.5″W
- Area: less than one acre
- Built: 1916
- Built by: H.A. Maine
- Architect: Clinton P. Shockley
- Architectural style: Classical Revival
- MPS: Downtown Waterloo MPS
- NRHP reference No.: 14000663
- Added to NRHP: September 22, 2014

The Overland Waterloo Company Building is a historic building located in Waterloo, Iowa, United States. Built in 1916 by the Corn Belt Auto Company, the four-story, brick structure housed the Northeast Iowa distributorship for Willys-Overland Motors. Designed by Waterloo architect Clinton P. Shockley, it features brick and terra cotta pilasters, terra cotta plaques with swag motif, molding, and a balconet. The first floor housed the sales offices and a service garage. The second floor was occupied by a clubroom/lounge, a display room for used cars, a battery-charging room, a workroom, stockroom, shop and employees' room. The third and fourth floors were used to store automobiles to be delivered to dealers and customers. Corn Belt lost their distributorship by way of a corporate restructuring in 1921, but maintained an Overland dealership here until 1927 when they moved to a different building. The building housed other automobile related business until 1955. In that year KWWL radio and KWWL-TV moved into the main floor and other businesses occupied the other floors. Black Hawk Broadcasting Company, which owned the stations, converted the entire building for use as a broadcast facility in 1965. The building continues to function for that purpose. It was listed on the National Register of Historic Places in 2014.
