= Cedar Falls Post Office =

- U.S. National Register of Historic Places
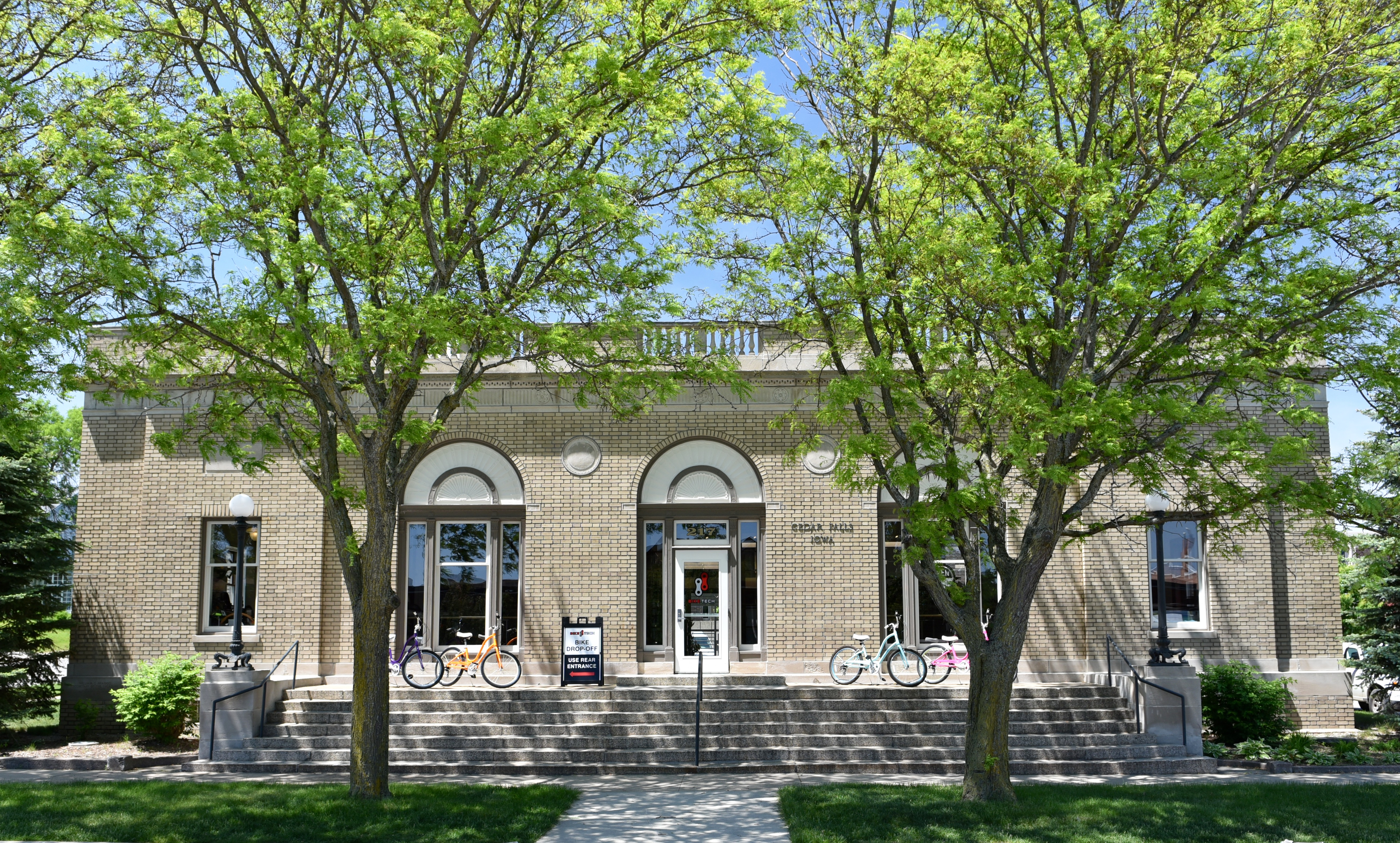

- Location within Iowa Location within the United States
- Location: 217 Washington St. Cedar Falls, Iowa
- Coordinates: 42°32′10.3″N 92°26′49.6″W
- Area: less than one acre
- Built: 1918
- Built by: Frederick C. Weitz
- Architect: James Wetmore
- Architectural style: Classical Revival
- NRHP reference No.: 16000057
- Added to NRHP: March 8, 2016

The old Cedar Falls Post Office is an historic building located in Cedar Falls, Iowa, United States. Completed in 1918, this was the city's first federal government building, and Black Hawk County became the only county in the state with two post offices that reported directly to the United States Post Office Department. It was built at the time when the design of federal building's were controlled by the Department of the Treasury. This building was designed by James A. Wetmore, who was the Acting Supervising Architect of the U.S. Office of the Supervising Architect. It was built by Des Moines contractor Frederick C. Weitz. The single-story Neoclassical brick structure features a symmetrical facade, a slightly recessed central bay, a round-arched entryway flanked by round arched windows, and Bedford stone trim.

The building served as a post office until 1961. At that time it was acquired by the city of Cedar Falls and utilized as an annex for city hall, which is immediately to the west. It was used for office space, a school, and for records storage. The city leased the building to the Cedar Falls Development Group in 2015, and they rehabilitated it and sublet it for retail space. The building was listed on the National Register of Historic Places in 2016.
