= Cotton Theatre =

- Cotton Theater
- U.S. National Register of Historic Places
- U.S. Historic district – Contributing property
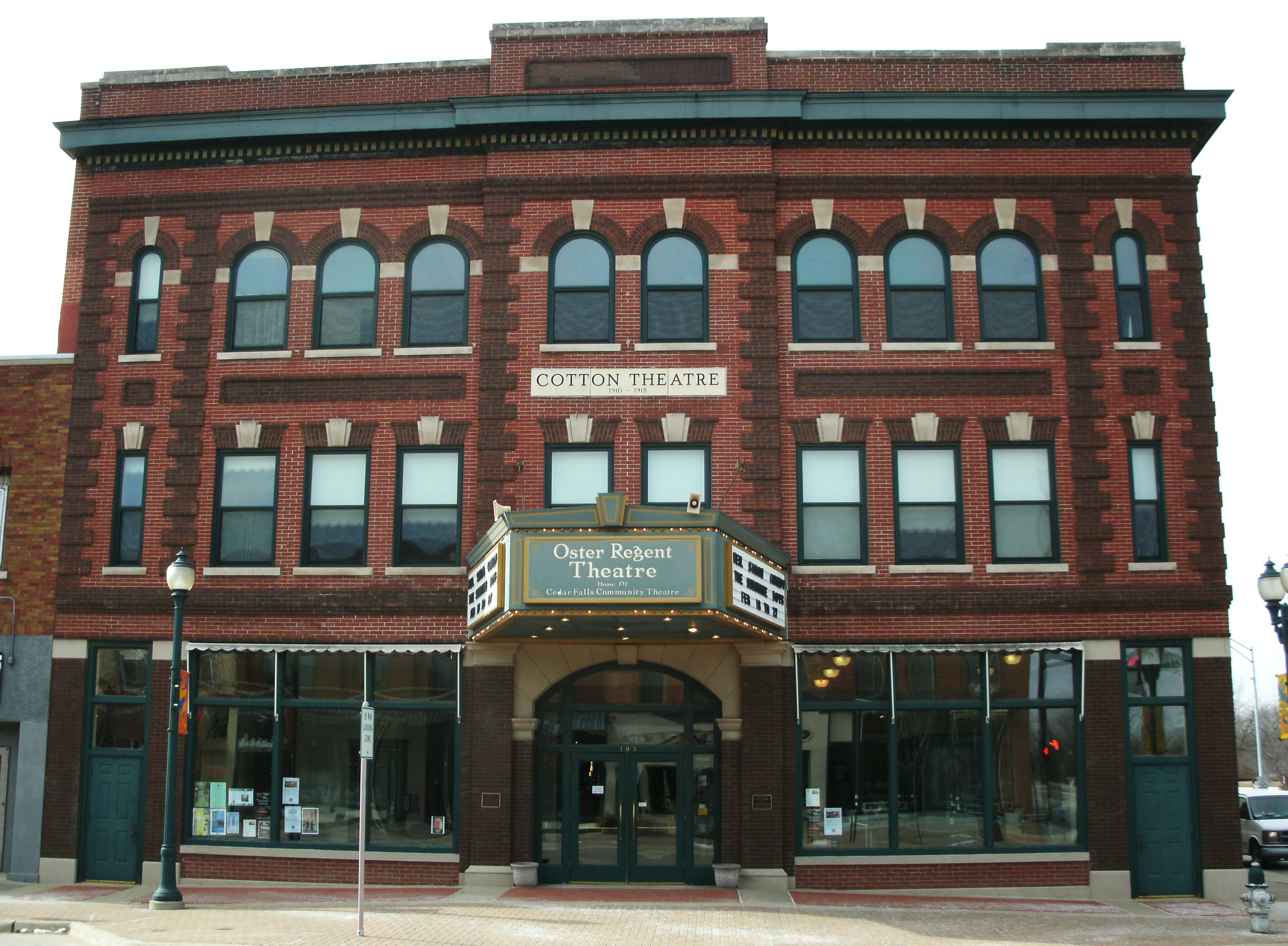
- Front of the theater

- Location within Iowa Location within the United States
- Location: 103 Main St. Cedar Falls, Iowa
- Coordinates: 42°32′14″N 92°26′42″W
- Area: Less than 1 acre (0.40 ha)
- Built: 1910
- Architect: Alban and Fisher
- Architectural style: Renaissance
- Part of: Cedar Falls Downtown Historic District (ID100001673)
- NRHP reference No.: 93000764
- Added to NRHP: July 23, 1993

The Cotton Theatre, also known as Regent Theatre and Oster Regent Theatre, is a theater located at the corner of 1st Street and Main Street in downtown Cedar Falls, Iowa, United States. It was named for local Cedar Falls resident Frank Cotton who built the theater in 1909 and 1910.

In its 1993 nomination to the National Register of Historic Places it was deemed "one of the best examples of commercial architecture on Cedar Falls' main street" and was then the only existing theatre there. It is in Italian Renaissance style.

== History ==
The opening night of the Cotton Theatre was Thursday, June 23, 1910. On that night, The Rejuvenation of Aunt Mary, chosen from the May Robson Company, was shown. The original theater had seating for 1,000 patrons.

In 1918, the name was changed to Regent Theatre. In 1991 the Blair family along with the Beck Trust gave the theater to the Cedar Falls Community Theatre. In 1994, it was restored at a price of $1.2 million and was given the new name Oster Regent Theatre. The theater is still widely used today and seats 500 people.

The theatre was listed on the National Register of Historic Places in 1993. In 2017 it was included as a contributing property in the Cedar Falls Downtown Historic District.
