= Waterloo Masonic Temple =

- U.S. National Register of Historic Places
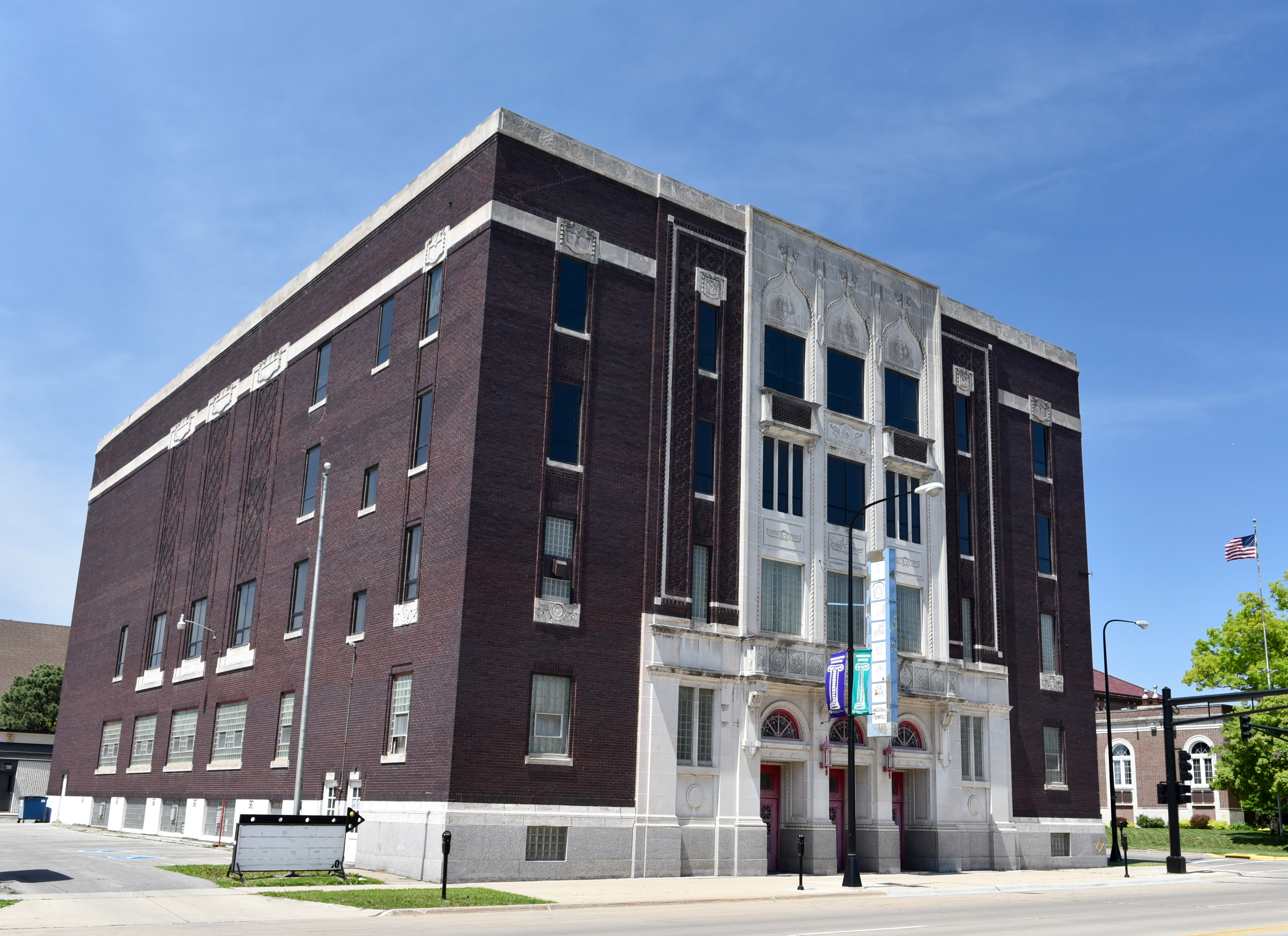

- Location within Iowa Location within the United States
- Location: 325 E. Park Ave. Waterloo, Iowa
- Coordinates: 42°30′02″N 92°20′08.6″W
- Area: less than one acre
- Built: 1928
- Built by: Currie Construction Co.
- Architect: John G. Ralston
- Architectural style: Late 19th and 20th Century Revivals
- NRHP reference No.: 13000921
- Added to NRHP: December 18, 2013

The Waterloo Masonic Temple is a historic building located in Waterloo, Iowa, United States. The first Masonic lodge in town, No. 105 A.F. & A.M, was established on the west side of the Cedar River in 1857. Lodge No. 296 was organized on the east side of the river in 1871, and the two consolidated into one lodge eight years later. They built their first Masonic Temple in 1899 at the intersection of Sycamore Street and East Park Avenue. The city was in the midst of a period economic growth that would see its population double each decade from 1890 to 1910. By 1918 the Masons felt the need for a new facility. Property at the intersection of East Park Avenue and Mulberry Street was acquired in 1920. Local architect John G. Ralston, a fellow Mason, was chosen to design the new building in what has been termed the "Phoenician Revival" style. The exterior walls were completed in 1925, but the interior wasn't completed until 1928. It is a four-story structure built over a raised basement. Its exterior walls are composed of dark red brick accented with light grey limestone. The main façade features a central entrance pavilion with three entrance ways that terminate in Moorish peaks near the roofline. Various Masonic symbols are found carved into the stone, and decorative brickwork flanks the central stone pavilion. The building was listed on the National Register of Historic Places in 2013.
