= Grace Methodist Episcopal Church (Winfield, Kansas) =

Historic church in Kansas, United States

- U.S. National Register of Historic Places
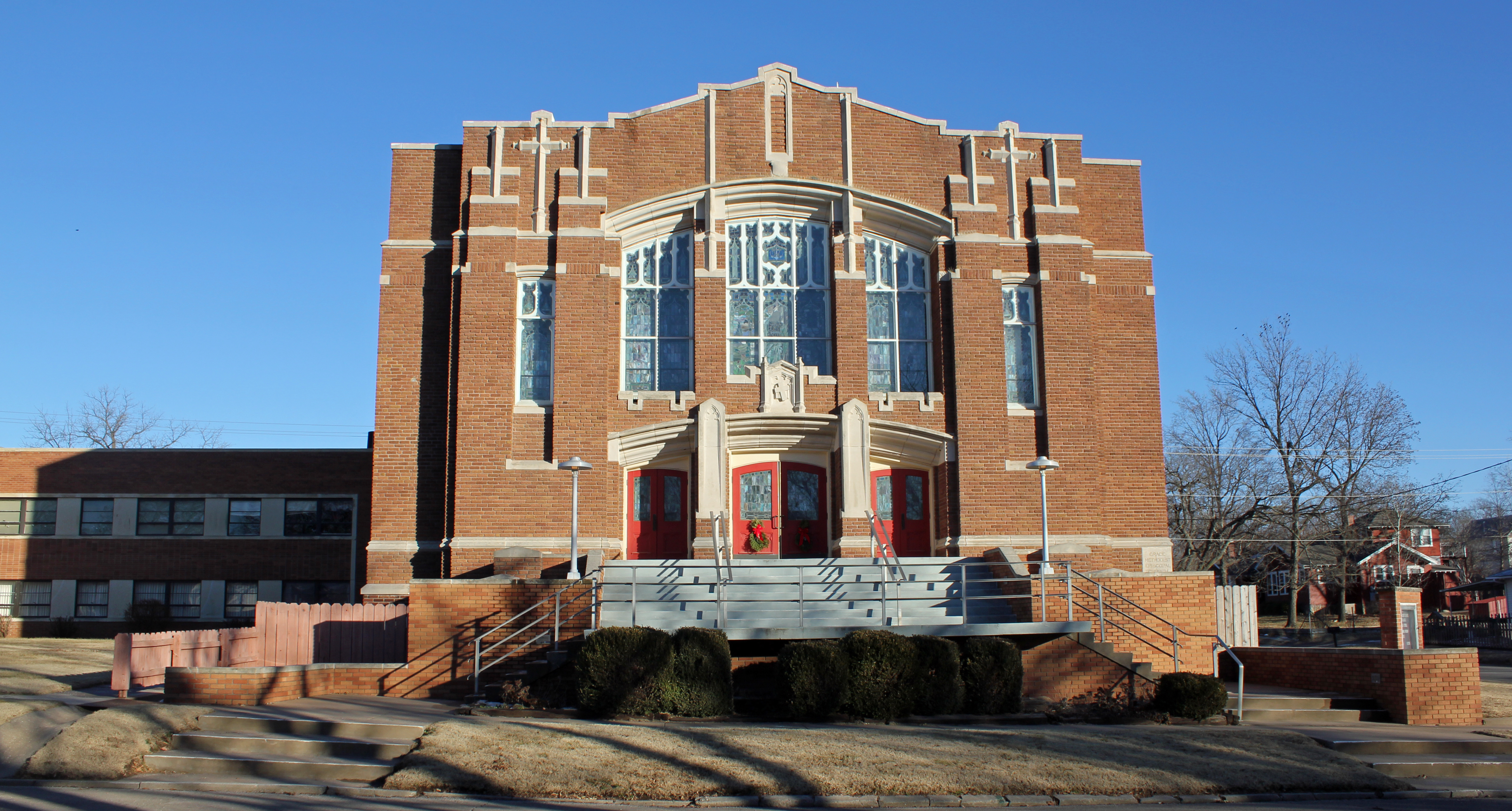

- Location within Kansas Location within the United States
- Location: 320 College St., Winfield, Kansas
- Coordinates: 37°14′48″N 96°58′39″W
- Area: less than one acre
- Built: 1917, 1959
- Architect: Brostrom, Ernest Olaf
- Architectural style: Collegiate Gothic
- NRHP reference No.: 05001241
- Added to NRHP: November 15, 2005

The Grace Methodist Episcopal Church in Winfield, Kansas is a historic church which was built in 1917. It has been known as Grace United Methodist Church since the Methodist Episcopal Church and the Evangelical United Brethren Church merged in 1968. It is located at 320 College Street in Winfield. It was added to the National Register of Historic Places in 2005.

It is a large three-story church designed by Ernest Olaf Brostrom in Collegiate Gothic style. Its main portion is 69 by 48 feet (21 m × 15 m) in plan. A two-story education wing was added in 1959.
