= Chicago Great Western Railroad-Waterloo Freight Depot =

Historic building in Waterloo, Iowa, US

- U.S. National Register of Historic Places
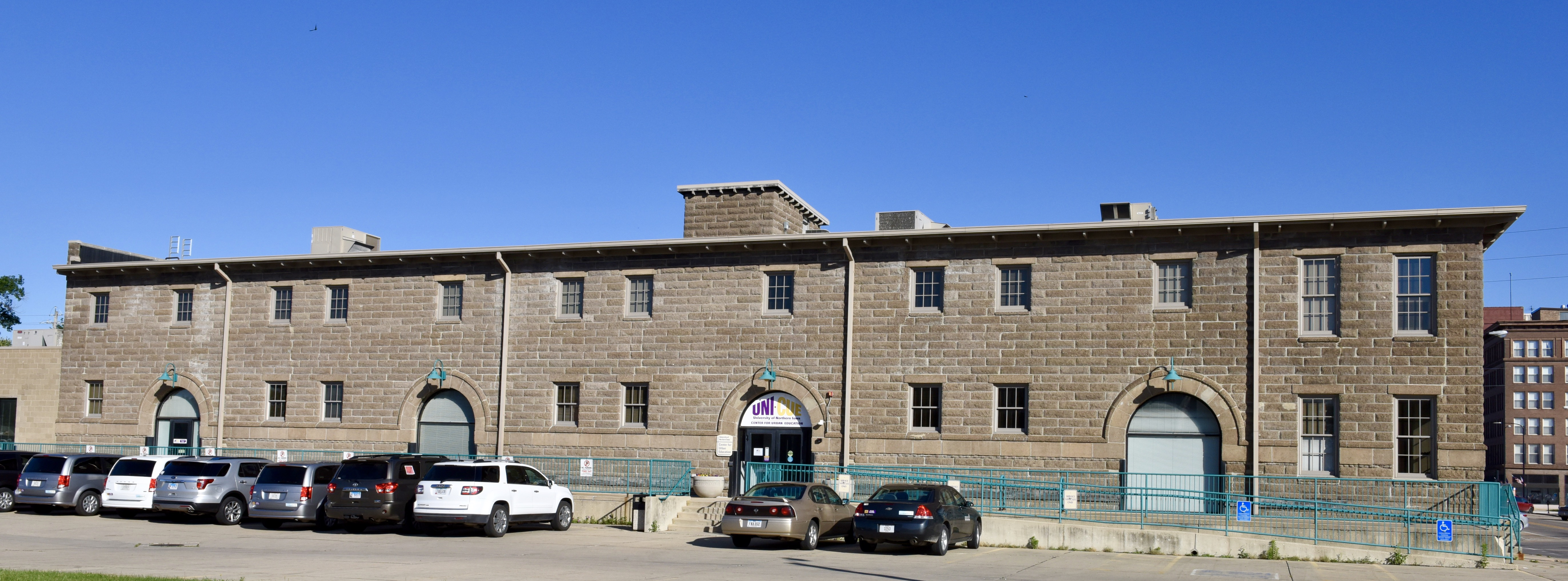

- Location within Iowa Location within the United States
- Location: 6th St. Waterloo, Iowa
- Coordinates: 42°29′47″N 92°20′03″W
- Area: less than one acre
- Built: 1903
- MPS: Waterloo MPS
- NRHP reference No.: 88001324
- Added to NRHP: January 17, 1997

The Chicago Great Western Railroad-Waterloo Freight Depot is a historic building located in Waterloo, Iowa, United States. In 1887 the Chicago, St. Paul & Kansas City Railroad (CSP&KC) was the third system to enter the city, after the Illinois Central (1870) and the Burlington, Cedar Rapids and Northern Railway (1876). The CSP&KC was the first of the three to put its depots in the downtown area. Initially it built two depots in Waterloo, one on the west side of the Cedar River and one on the east side. By 1892 it had built separate passenger and freight depots along East Sixth Street. That was the same year that the CSP&KC became known as the Chicago Great Western Railroad. In 1903 the railroad built new passenger and freight depots a block south, moving them closer to the city's wholesale houses. The two-story concrete block freight depot was built on a rough limestone foundation. It features round arch freight doors and a simple wood cornice. The concrete block addition on the southeast side replaced a frame gabled structure, but its construction date is unknown. The old brick passenger depot was torn down in 1973, and the freight depot was listed on the National Register of Historic Places in 1997. In 2001 the building, which is owned by the City of Waterloo, was leased to the University of Northern Iowa for its Center for Urban Education (UNI-CUE).
