= Dunsmore House =

Historic house in Iowa, United States

- U.S. National Register of Historic Places
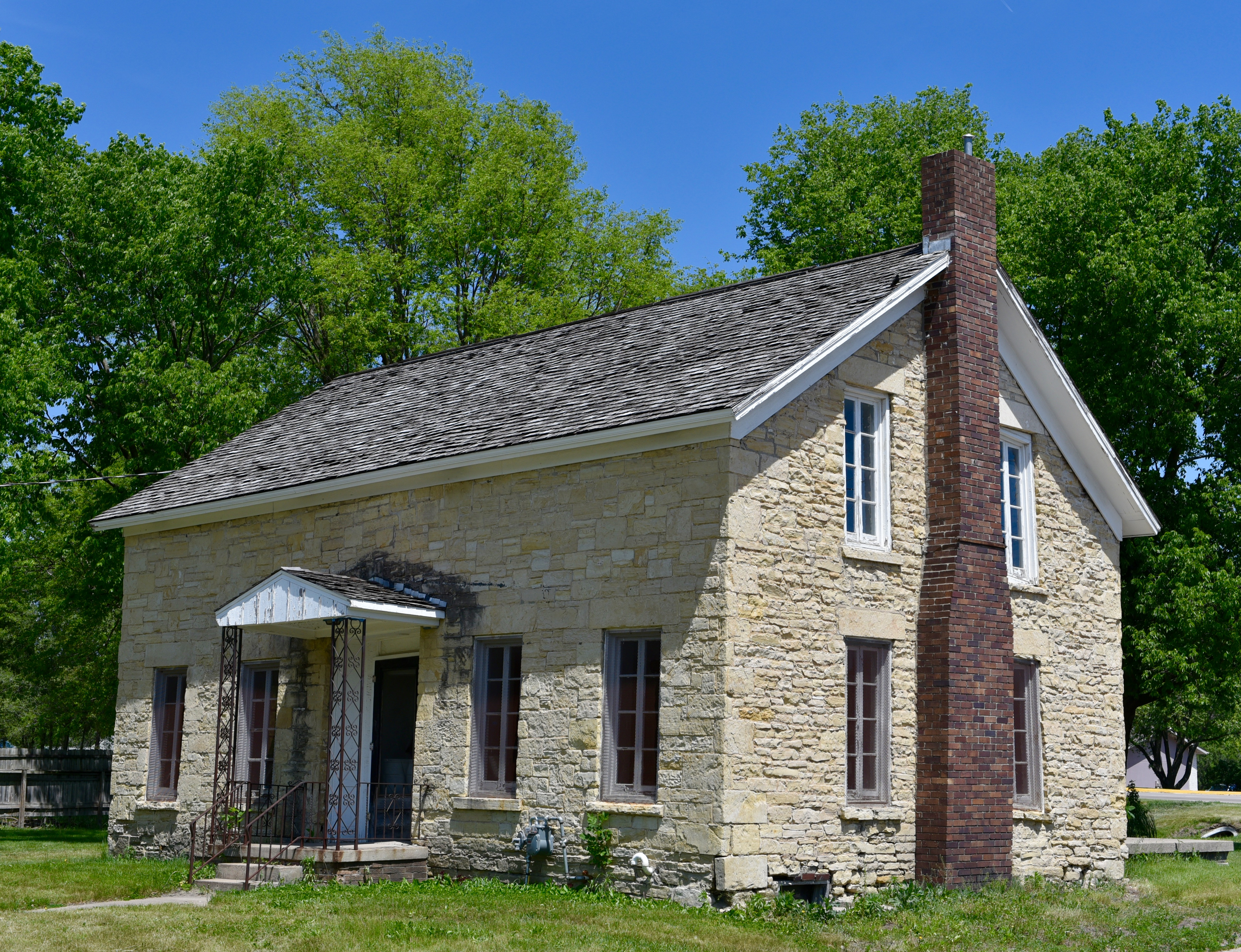

- Location within Iowa Location within the United States
- Location: 902 Logan Avenue; Waterloo, Iowa
- Coordinates: 42°30′47.7″N 92°20′14.5″W
- Area: less than one acre
- Built: 1866
- Built by: Thomas Chadwick
- NRHP reference No.: 77000497
- Added to NRHP: November 17, 1977

The Dunsmore House is a historic building in Waterloo, Iowa, United States. Thomas Chadwick, a master stonemason originally from England, built this house from native rusticated limestone about 1866. It is one of the earliest extant houses, and the only house made of limestone block still extant in the Waterloo-Cedar Falls area.

John F. Dunsmore, who worked for the Illinois Central Railroad, was the first occupant. The house features a symmetrical five bay facade, a brick chimney, and simple wooden cornice. A frame addition was built onto the back of the house in 1913. The wood and wrought iron porch is not original. The house was listed on the National Register of Historic Places in 1977.
