= Hotel President (Waterloo, Iowa) =

- U.S. National Register of Historic Places
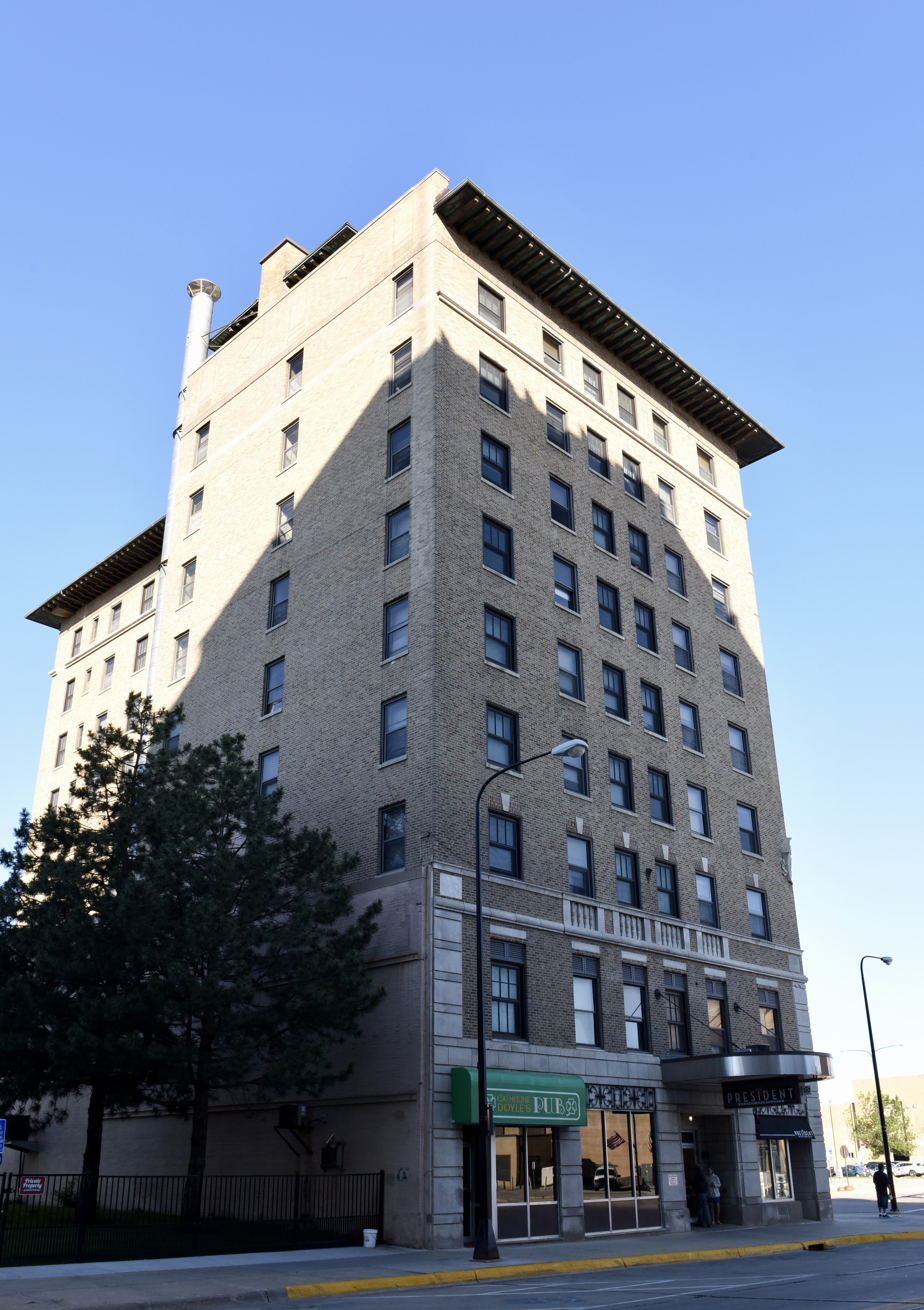

- Location within Iowa Location within the United States
- Location: 500 Sycamore St. Waterloo, Iowa
- Coordinates: 42°29′55″N 92°20′13.4″W
- Area: less than one acre
- Built: 1929
- NRHP reference No.: 10000048
- Added to NRHP: April 24, 2017

The Hotel President, also known as the Park Towers Apartments, is an historic building located in downtown Waterloo, Iowa, United States. The building was completed in 1929, and it opened as a "showcase hotel." In 1948, Paul "Pinkie" George and five other wrestling promoters from the Midwest founded the National Wrestling Alliance in the hotel. The manager of the hotel at the time was Lark Gable, the grandfather of Olympic gold medal winner Dan Gable. Various companies owned and operated the hotel until it was acquired in 1968 by Elders Inc., a nonprofit group of churches. They converted the building into subsidized housing. It was bought by local developers Brent Dahlstrom and Jim Sulentic in 2011 and they sold it to Huntley Witmer Development of Los Angeles. Huntley Witmer spent $12 million in 2015 renovating the building that continues to house 84 units of federally subsidized housing. It was listed on the National Register of Historic Places in 2017.
