= Walnut Street Baptist Church (Waterloo, Iowa) =

- U.S. National Register of Historic Places
- U.S. Historic district – Contributing property
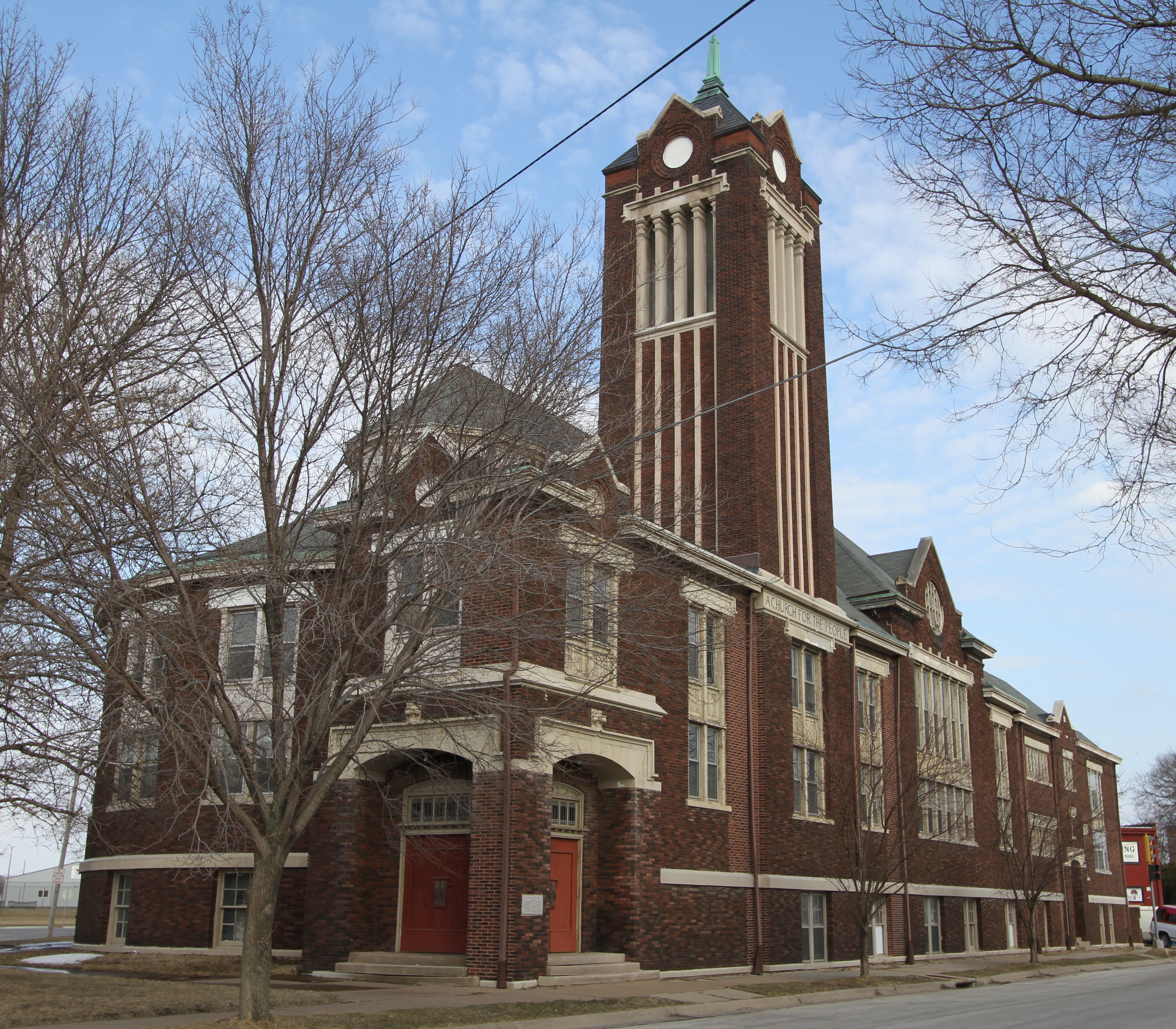

- Location within Iowa Location within the United States
- Location: 415 Walnut St. Waterloo, Iowa
- Coordinates: 42°30′9″N 92°20′2″W
- Built: 1908
- Architect: Clinton P. Shockley
- Architectural style: Late 19th and early 20th century American Movements
- Part of: Walnut Street Historic District (ID100004414)
- NRHP reference No.: 00000983
- Added to NRHP: August 16, 2000

Walnut Street Baptist Church is a church building in downtown Waterloo, Iowa, United States. It has also been known as Faith Temple Baptist Church.

Built in 1908, it was designed for its triangular lot by Waterloo architect Clinton P. Shockley. Although the main exterior materials are merely brick plus stone and concrete trim, the building reflects multiple architectural influences:

The building exhibits the influence of a combination of contemporary architectural styles and trends of the early 20th century including the English Arts and Crafts movement and the Chicago School with minor indications of the academic tradition of the Beaux-Arts.

Clinton Phillip Shockley began his architectural practice in 1906. This was an important work for him. He and Mortimer Cleveland were "by far" the most qualified architects in Iowa and were able to win contracts that would previously have gone to non-Iowa firms.

The Walnut Street Baptist Church congregation worshiped in the facility from its construction until 1970. The congregation was an early leader in the General Association of Regular Baptist Churches. Upon relocating to a new facility and changing its name to Walnut Ridge Baptist Church, the congregation sold the downtown site to Faith Temple Baptist Church (American Baptist Churches USA).

The building was individually listed on the National Register of Historic Places in 2000. In 2019 it was included as a contributing building in the Walnut Street Historic District.
