= Waterloo West Commercial Historic District =

Historic district in Iowa, United States

- Waterloo West Commercial; Historic District
- U.S. National Register of Historic Places
- U.S. Historic district
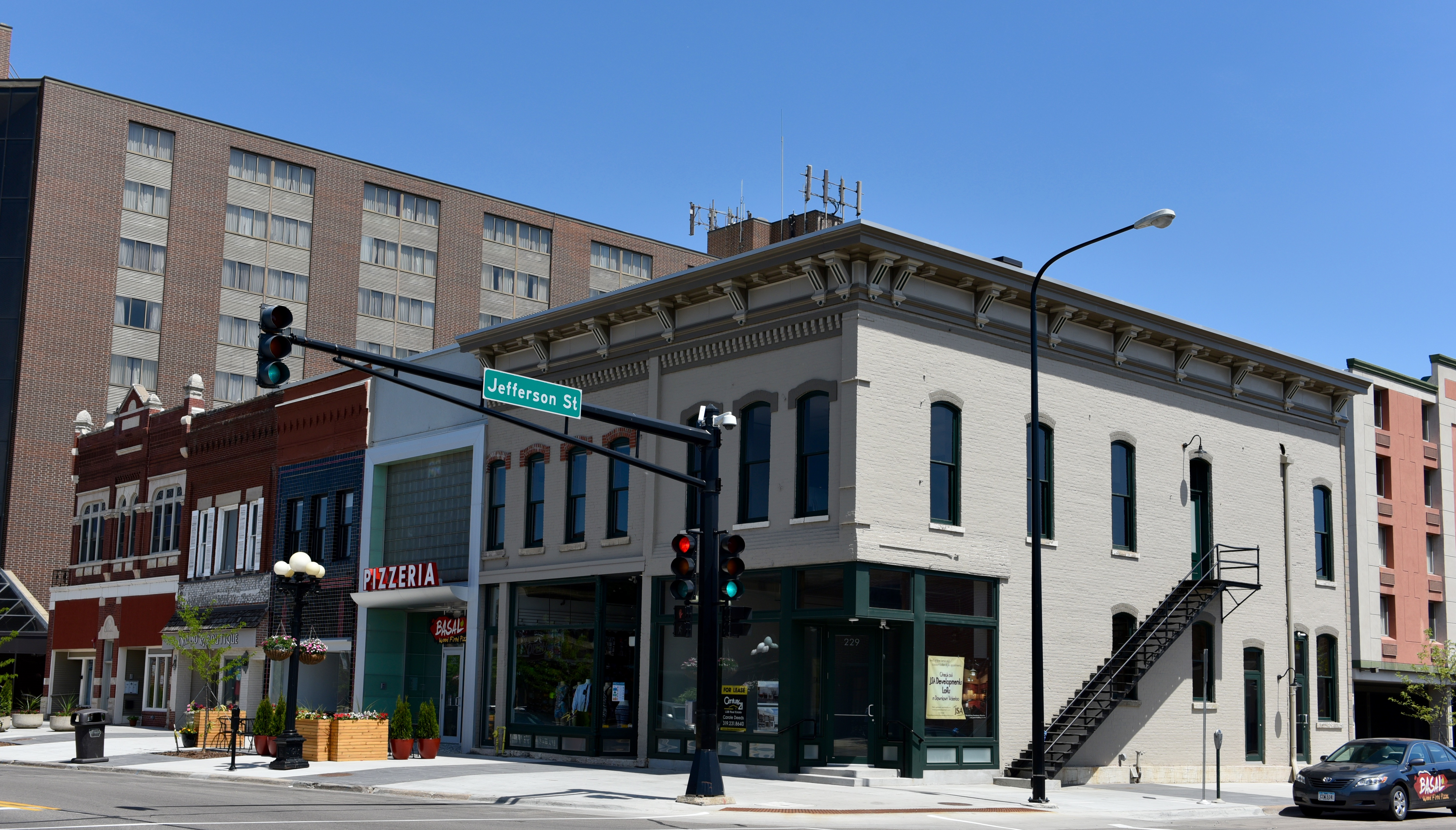

- Location within Iowa Location within the United States
- Location: 217-333 W. 4th., 301-317 W. 5th & 612-716 Jefferson Sts., Waterloo, Iowa
- Coordinates: 42°29′39.5″N 92°20′26.2″W
- Area: 6 acres (2.4 ha)
- Architect: Josselyn & Taylor
- Architectural style: Late Victorian; Late 19th and Early 20th Century American Movement
- MPS: Downtown Waterloo MPS
- NRHP reference No.: 14000664
- Added to NRHP: September 22, 2014

The Waterloo West Commercial Historic District is a nationally recognized historic district located in Waterloo, Iowa, United States. It was listed on the National Register of Historic Places in 2014. At the time of its nomination the district consisted of 25 resources, including 22 contributing buildings, and three non-contributing buildings. The buildings are from one to three stories in height, and for the most part are clad in brick. The earliest building dates to 1882 and the latest, as of 2014, to 2000. For the must part they utilize the Victorian, Romanesque Revival, and Italianate commercial styles. Ornamentation is minimal. The buildings are all commercial structures with the exception of the former Burlington, Cedar Rapids and Northern Railway Depot, designed by the Cedar Rapids architectural firm of Josselyn & Taylor. Several of the buildings housed automobile-related businesses that clustered along West Fifth Street beginning in the 1920s and 1930s.
