= Round Barn, Washington Township (Janesville, Iowa) =

- U.S. National Register of Historic Places
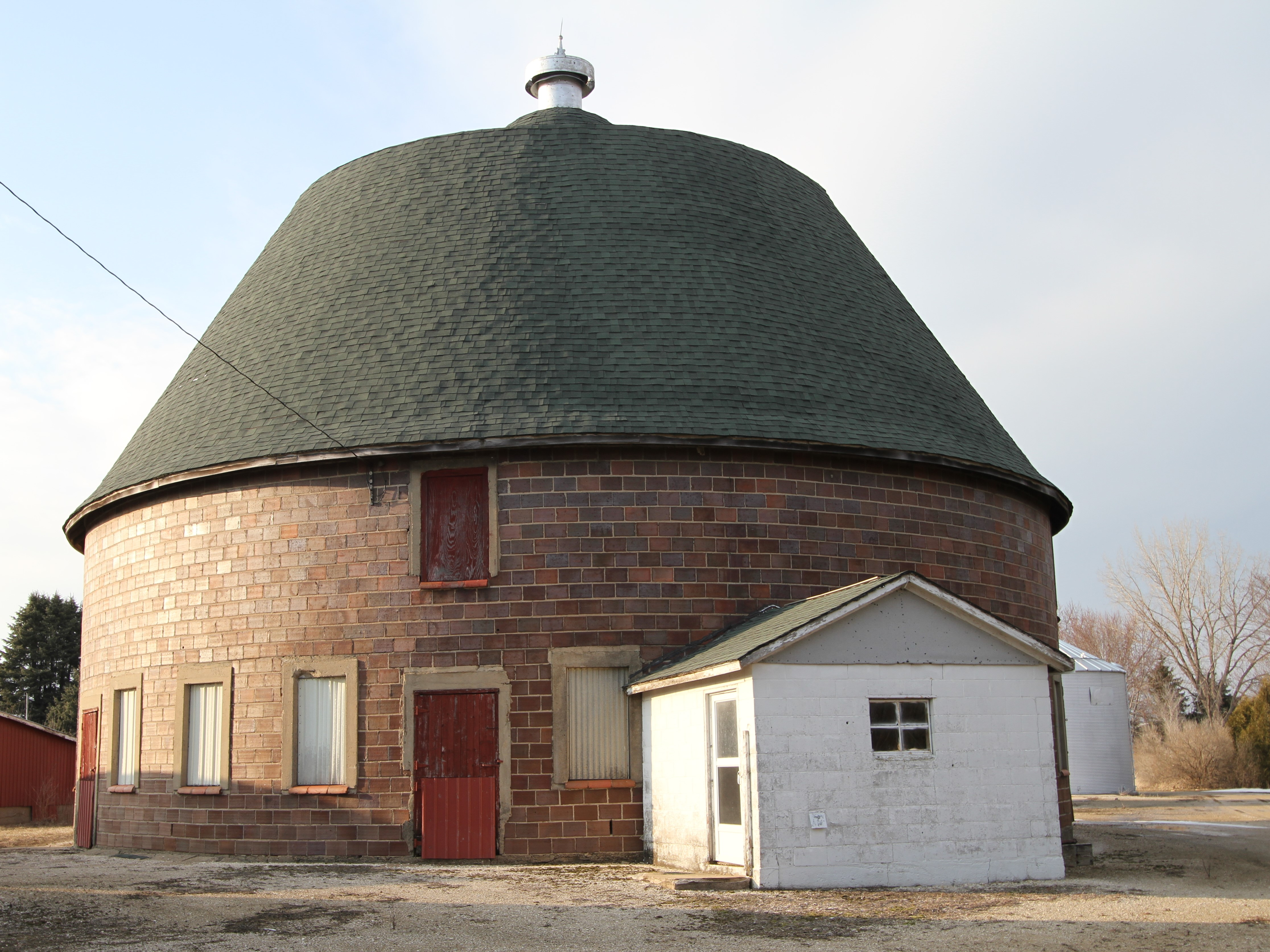

- Location within Iowa Location within the United States
- Location: Off U.S. Route 218
- Nearest city: Janesville, Iowa
- Coordinates: 42°35′7″N 92°27′40″W
- Area: less than one acre
- Built: 1917
- MPS: Iowa Round Barns: The Sixty Year Experiment TR
- NRHP reference No.: 86001417
- Added to NRHP: June 30, 1986

The Round Barn, Washington Township is a historic building located south of Janesville, Iowa in Black Hawk County, United States. It was built in 1917 as a dairy barn. The building is a true round barn that measures 60 feet (18 m) in diameter. The structure is constructed in clay tile and features an aerator and a two-pitch roof. It was built around a silo with a water tank on top of it. While that is typical of this type of structure, it is the only one known to exist in Iowa. It has been listed on the National Register of Historic Places since 1986.
