= Grace Methodist Episcopal Church (Waterloo, Iowa) =

- U.S. National Register of Historic Places
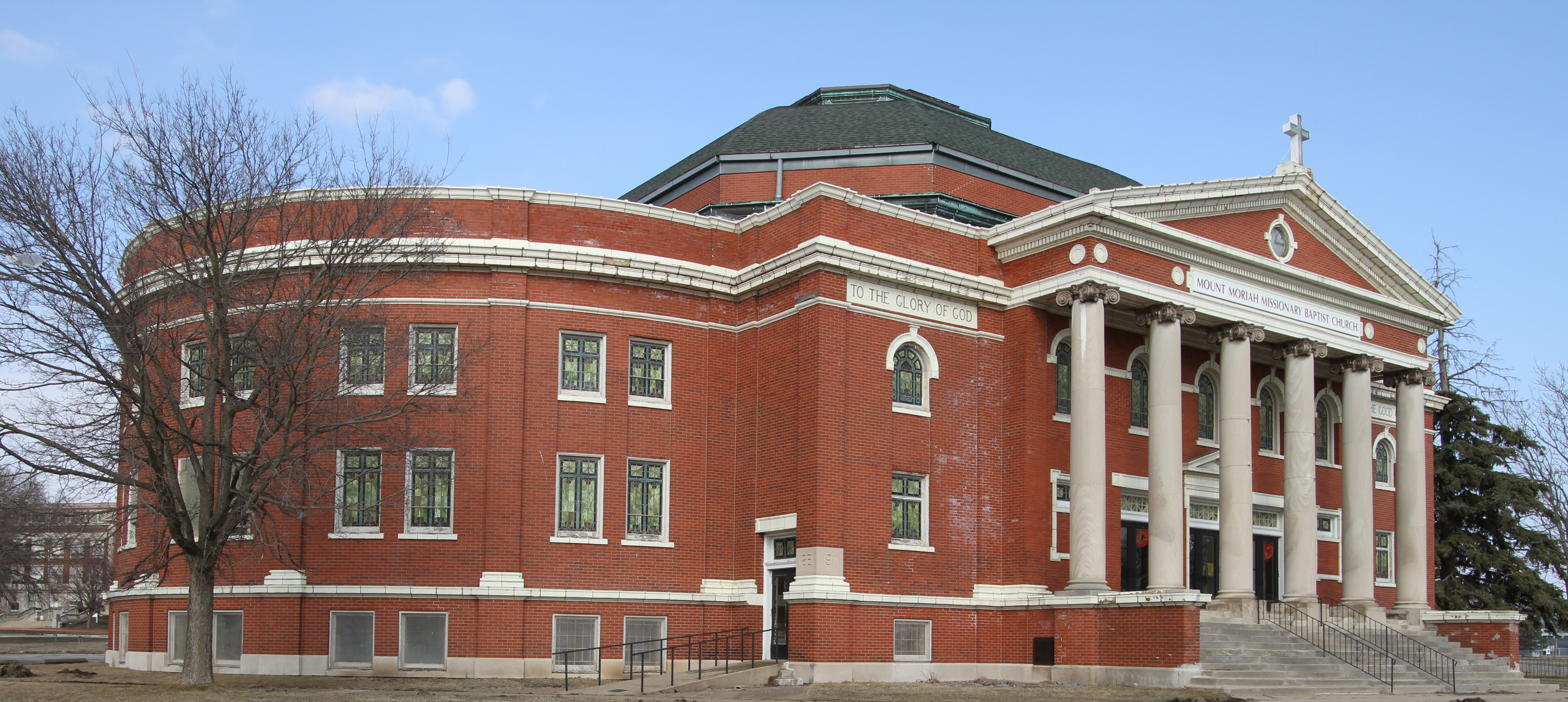

- Location within Iowa Location within the United States
- Location: 633 Walnut Street; Waterloo, Iowa
- Coordinates: 42°30′3.5″N 92°19′51.4″W
- Area: less than one acre
- Built: 1912-1913
- Architect: Turnbill & Jones
- Architectural style: Classical Revival
- NRHP reference No.: 11000719
- Added to NRHP: October 6, 2011

Grace Methodist Episcopal Church, also known as Mount Moriah Missionary Baptist Church, is a historic building located in Waterloo, Iowa, United States. The congregation that built this building was organized in 1861 as First Methodist Episcopal Church. They built church buildings in 1865 at Lafayette and East Fifth Streets, and then at East Fourth and Mulberry Streets in 1877. They changed their name to Grace in 1895. They completed this building at Walnut and East Fifth Streets in 1913. The brick, Neoclassical structure designed by Turnbill & Jones features a large central dome and a large classical portico with six Ionic columns. Mount Moriah Missionary Baptist Church acquired the building from Grace United Methodist in 1996. The building was listed on the National Register of Historic Places in 2011.
