= La Porte City, Iowa =

- City
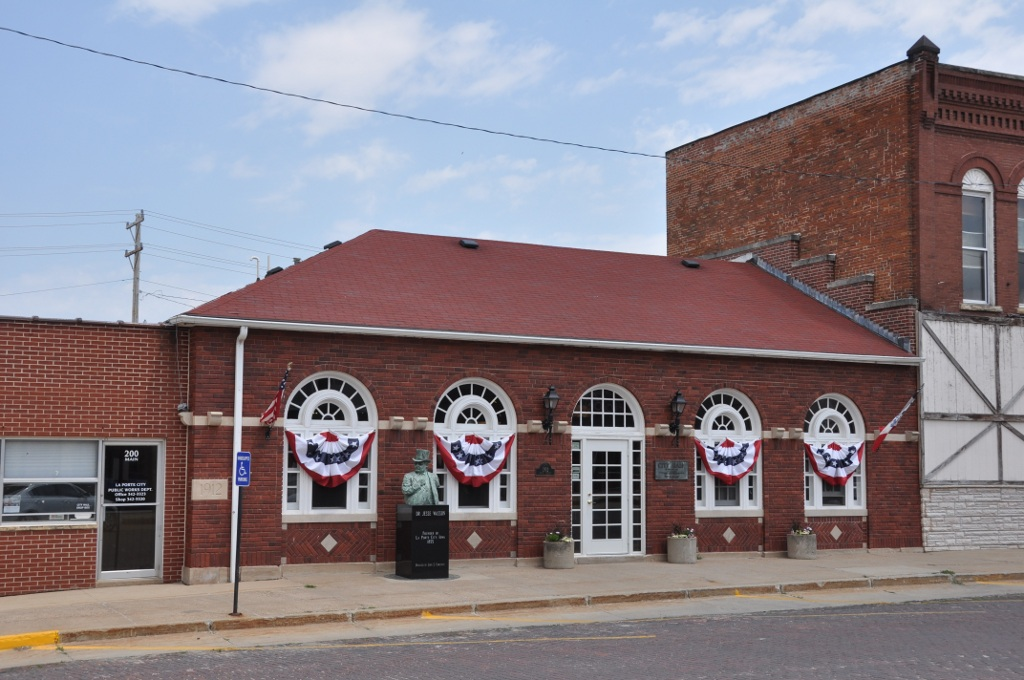
- La Porte City's City Hall

- Location of La Porte City, Iowa
- Coordinates: 42°18′49″N 92°11′29″W
- Country: US
- State: Iowa
- County: Black Hawk

Area
  - Total: 2.63 sq mi (6.80 km^{2})
  - Land: 2.56 sq mi (6.63 km^{2})
  - Water: 0.066 sq mi (0.17 km^{2})
- Elevation: 827 ft (252 m)

Population (2020)
  - Total: 2,284
  - Density: 893/sq mi (344.7/km^{2})
- Time zone: UTC-6 (Central (CST))
  - Summer (DST): UTC-5 (CDT)
- ZIP code: 50651
- Area code: 319
- FIPS code: 19-43365
- GNIS feature ID: 2395571
- Website: www.lpcia.com

La Porte City is a city in Black Hawk County, Iowa, United States. The population was 2,284 at the 2020 census. It is part of the Waterloo–Cedar Falls Metropolitan Statistical Area.

== History ==
La Porte City was platted in 1855. It is named after La Porte, Indiana, the former home of one of its founders.

== Geography ==
According to the United States Census Bureau, the city has a total area of 2.62 square miles (6.79 km^{2}), of which 2.55 square miles (6.60 km^{2}) is land and 0.07 square miles (0.18 km^{2}) is water.

== Demographics ==
Historical populations
Year	Pop.	±%
1880	1,006	—
1890	1,052	+4.6%
1900	1,419	+34.9%
1910	1,233	−13.1%
1920	1,443	+17.0%
1930	1,470	+1.9%
1940	1,594	+8.4%
1950	1,770	+11.0%
1960	1,953	+10.3%
1970	2,256	+15.5%
1980	2,324	+3.0%
1990	2,128	−8.4%
2000	2,275	+6.9%
2010	2,285	+0.4%
2020	2,284	−0.0%
Source:"U.S. Census website". United States Census Bureau. and Iowa Data Center; Source: U.S. Decennial Census

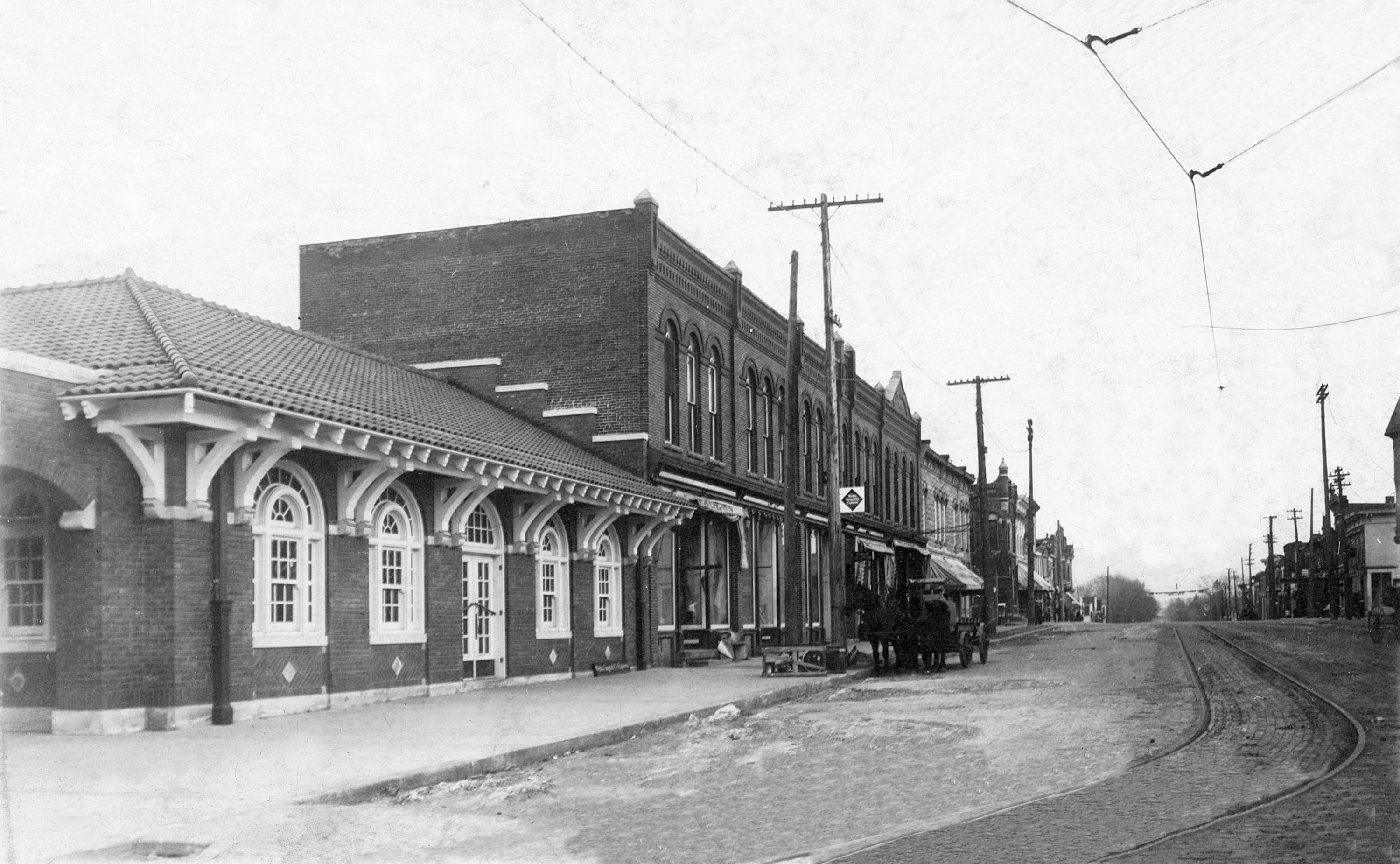
Main Street

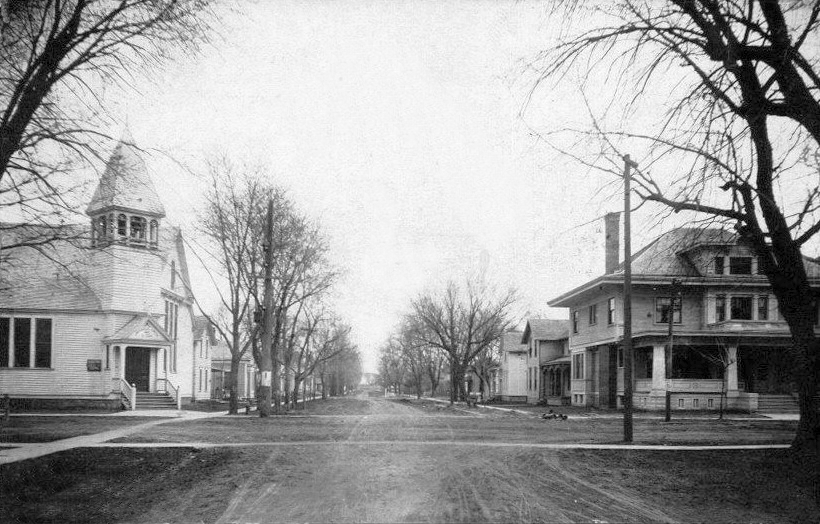
Walnut and 3rd Streets, circa 1915

=== 2020 census ===
As of the 2020 census, La Porte City had a population of 2,284. The population density was 892.8 inhabitants per square mile (344.7/km^{2}). The median age was 40.5 years. 25.2% of residents were under the age of 18. For every 100 females there were 97.2 males, and for every 100 females age 18 and over there were 95.0 males age 18 and over. 28.3% of residents were under the age of 20; 4.7% were between the ages of 20 and 24; 23.7% were from 25 to 44; 25.0% were from 45 to 64; and 18.3% were 65 years of age or older. The gender makeup of the city was 49.3% male and 50.7% female.

0.0% of residents lived in urban areas, while 100.0% lived in rural areas.

There were 939 households and 619 families in the city. Of those households, 32.8% had children under the age of 18 living with them, 50.6% were married couples living together, 8.9% were cohabitating couples, 23.7% had a female householder with no spouse or partner present, and 16.7% had a male householder with no spouse or partner present. 34.1% of households were non-families. 27.9% of all households were made up of individuals, and 14.2% had someone living alone who was 65 years old or older.

There were 1,010 housing units, at an average density of 394.8 per square mile (152.4/km^{2}), of which 7.0% were vacant. The homeowner vacancy rate was 3.1% and the rental vacancy rate was 6.2%.

Racial composition as of the 2020 census
Race	Number	Percent
White	2,218	97.1%
Black or African American	9	0.4%
American Indian and Alaska Native	3	0.1%
Asian	1	0.0%
Native Hawaiian and Other Pacific Islander	0	0.0%
Some other race	7	0.3%
Two or more races	46	2.0%
Hispanic or Latino (of any race)	35	1.5%

=== 2010 census ===
As of the census of 2010, there were 2,285 people, 915 households, and 601 families living in the city. The population density was 896.1 inhabitants per square mile (346.0/km^{2}). There were 996 housing units at an average density of 390.6 per square mile (150.8/km^{2}). The racial makeup of the city was 97.8% White, 0.8% African American, 0.1% Native American, 0.2% Asian, 0.1% from other races, and 1.0% from two or more races. Hispanic or Latino of any race were 1.0% of the population.

There were 915 households, of which 34.5% had children under the age of 18 living with them, 52.6% were married couples living together, 9.6% had a female householder with no husband present, 3.5% had a male householder with no wife present, and 34.3% were non-families. 29.9% of all households were made up of individuals, and 15.3% had someone living alone who was 65 years of age or older. The average household size was 2.45 and the average family size was 3.04.

The median age in the city was 39.6 years. 27% of residents were under the age of 18; 5.5% were between the ages of 18 and 24; 24.9% were from 25 to 44; 24.4% were from 45 to 64; and 18.3% were 65 years of age or older. The gender makeup of the city was 47.0% male and 53.0% female.

=== 2000 census ===
As of the census of 2000, there were 2,275 people, 936 households, and 643 families living in the city. The population density was 866.3 inhabitants per square mile (334.5/km^{2}). There were 980 housing units at an average density of 373.2 per square mile (144.1/km^{2}). The racial makeup of the city was 99.16% White, 0.13% African American, 0.22% Native American, 0.09% Asian, 0.04% from other races, and 0.35% from two or more races. Hispanic or Latino of any race were 0.22% of the population.

There were 936 households, out of which 33.0% had children under the age of 18 living with them, 55.7% were married couples living together, 10.6% had a female householder with no husband present, and 31.3% were non-families. 28.2% of all households were made up of individuals, and 16.5% had someone living alone who was 65 years of age or older. The average household size was 2.43 and the average family size was 2.97.

In the city, the population was spread out, with 26.4% under the age of 18, 8.0% from 18 to 24, 26.3% from 25 to 44, 20.7% from 45 to 64, and 18.6% who were 65 years of age or older. The median age was 37 years. For every 100 females, there were 91.3 males. For every 100 females age 18 and over, there were 86.3 males.

The median income for a household in the city was $37,540, and the median income for a family was $46,544. Males had a median income of $31,629 versus $22,133 for females. The per capita income for the city was $19,266. About 4.1% of families and 6.2% of the population were below the poverty line, including 6.6% of those under age 18 and 7.5% of those age 65 or over.

== Education ==
Union Community School District serves the municipality. The district was established on July 1, 1993 by the merger of the La Porte City Community School District and the Dysart-Geneseo Community School District.

== Notable people ==
- Fran Allison, old-time radio and early television personality
- Patrick Bedard, automotive journalist and driver in the 1983 and 1984 Indianapolis 500
- Peg Mullen (1917–2009), anti-war activist and writer.
