= National Register of Historic Places listings in Cedar County, Iowa =

Location of Cedar County in Iowa

This is a list of the National Register of Historic Places listings in Cedar County, Iowa.

This is intended to be a complete list of the properties and districts on the National Register of Historic Places in Cedar County, Iowa, United States. Latitude and longitude coordinates are provided for many National Register properties and districts; these locations may be seen together in a map.

There are 18 properties and districts listed on the National Register in the county, including 1 National Historic Landmark.

This National Park Service list is complete through NPS recent listings posted March 21, 2025.

== Current listings ==
	Name on the Register	Image	Date listed	Location	City or town	Description
1	Cedar County Sheriff's House and Jail	Cedar County Sheriff's House and Jail	September 13, 2003 (#03000913)	118 W. 4th St. 41°46′09″N 91°07′45″W	Tipton	
2	Downey Savings Bank	Downey Savings Bank	July 12, 1976 (#76000740)	Front St. 41°36′57″N 91°20′58″W	Downey	
3	Downey School	Downey School	May 28, 2019 (#100004017)	212 Broadway St. 41°36′54″N 91°20′57″W	Downey	
4	Floral Hall	Floral Hall	November 7, 1976 (#76000741)	West of Tipton at the Cedar County Fairgrounds; 41°46′25″N 91°08′38″W	Tipton	
5	William Green House	William Green House	April 29, 1999 (#99000488)	1709 Madison St. 41°40′26″N 91°09′43″W	Rochester	
6	Gruwell and Crew General Store	Gruwell and Crew General Store	September 9, 1982 (#82002610)	109 W. Main St. 41°40′05″N 91°20′49″W	West Branch	On the Most Endangered list of the Iowa Historic Preservation Alliance
7	Hannah Morse Fowler Hall House		May 1, 1998 (#98000378)	1285 Garfield Ave. 41°45′32″N 91°15′15″W	Buchanan	
8	Hardacre Theater	Hardacre Theater	January 5, 2016 (#15000951)	112 E. 5th St. 41°46′13″N 91°07′40″W	Tipton	
9	Herbert Hoover National Historic Site	Herbert Hoover National Historic Site	October 15, 1966 (#66000110)	Off Interstate 80; 41°40′05″N 91°20′58″W	West Branch	
10	Hotel Tipton	Hotel Tipton	November 5, 1998 (#98001328)	524-527 Cedar St. 41°46′15″N 91°07′43″W	Tipton	
11	Kreinbring Phillips 66 Gas Station	Kreinbring Phillips 66 Gas Station	August 10, 2000 (#00000933)	200 Main St. 41°51′28″N 90°55′13″W	Lowden	
12	Lincoln Hotel	Lincoln Hotel	June 28, 1996 (#96000699)	408 Main St. 41°51′28″N 90°55′35″W	Lowden	
13	Mill Creek Bridge	Mill Creek Bridge	June 25, 1998 (#98000743)	Plum St. over Mill Creek; 41°54′15″N 91°03′53″W	Clarence	
14	Red Oak Grove Presbyterian Church and Cemetery	Red Oak Grove Presbyterian Church and Cemetery	February 3, 2010 (#09001302)	751 King Ave. 41°50′09″N 91°09′25″W	Tipton	
15	John Christian and Bertha Landrock Reichert House	John Christian and Bertha Landrock Reichert House	December 19, 1991 (#91001861)	508 E. 4th St. 41°46′09″N 91°07′13″W	Tipton	
16	St. Paul's Episcopal Church and Parish Hall	St. Paul's Episcopal Church and Parish Hall	January 3, 1985 (#85000002)	206 6th Ave. 41°35′55″N 90°54′46″W	Durant	
17	Tipton State Bank	Tipton State Bank	September 14, 2000 (#00001075)	501 Cedar St. 41°46′13″N 91°07′42″W	Tipton	
18	West Branch Commercial Historic District	West Branch Commercial Historic District	April 7, 1987 (#90000158)	W. Main and N. Downey Sts.; also N. Downey and E. and W. Main Sts.; also 124 W. Main St. 41°40′23″N 91°20′54″W	West Branch	Second and third sets of addresses represent boundary increases

== See also ==
- List of National Historic Landmarks in Iowa
- National Register of Historic Places listings in Iowa
- Listings in neighboring counties: Clinton, Johnson, Jones, Linn, Muscatine, Scott
