= John G. Ralston =

American architect

John G. Ralston was an American architect who worked out of Waterloo, Iowa. A number of his works are listed on the U.S. National Register of Historic Places for their architecture.

Works include (with attribution):

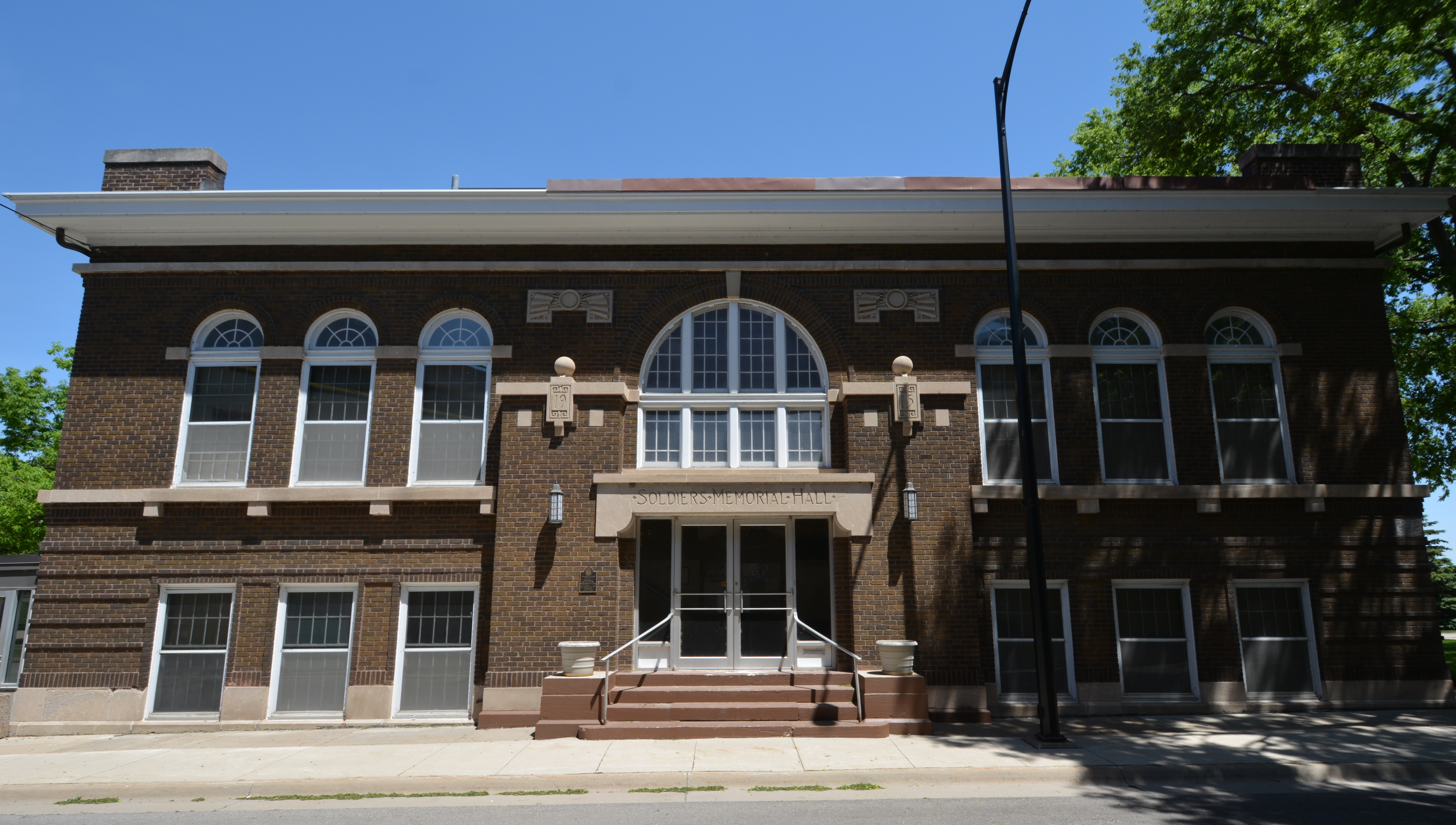
Black Hawk County Soldiers Memorial Hall

- Waterloo Public Library (West Branch) (1906), 528 W. 4th St., Waterloo, Iowa (Ralston, J. G.), NRHP-listed
- Waterloo Public Library-East Side Branch (1906), 626 Mulberry St., Waterloo, (Ralston, John G.), NRHP-listed
- Adams-Higgins House (1911 remodelling), 1215 N. Grand Ave. Spencer, Iowa (Ralston, J. G.), NRHP-listed
- Black Hawk Hotel (1914 redesign), 115-119 Main St. Cedar Falls, Iowa (Ralston, John G.), NRHP-listed
- Black Hawk County Soldiers Memorial Hall (1916), 194 W. Fifth St., Waterloo, (Ralston, John G.), NRHP-listed
- Cattle Congress Hippodrome (now The Hippodrome), Waterloo
- Chickasaw County Courthouse, Prospect St. at Locust Ave. New Hampton, Iowa (Ralston & Ralston), NRHP-listed
- Chickasaw County Home in New Hampton, Iowa
- Downey School, 212 Broadway St. Downey, Iowa (Ralston, J.G.), NRHP-listed
- Emerson School, 314 Randolph St. Waterloo, (Ralston, John G.), NRHP-listed
- Fayette County Courthouse, Pine St. West Union, Iowa (Ralston, J.G.), NRHP-listed
- Fire Station No. 2, 716 Commercial St., Waterloo, (Ralston, John G.), NRHP-listed
- Clement B. Gingrich House, 300 Walnut St. La Porte City, Iowa (Ralston, J.G.), NRHP-listed
- Hand County Courthouse and Jail, 415 W. First Ave. Miller, South Dakota (Ralston, John G.), NRHP-listed
- Kingsley Elementary School, Waterloo
- Sumner High School, 300 West 4th Sumner, Iowa (Murphy and Ralston), NRHP-listed
- Henry Weis House, 800 W. Fourth St., Waterloo, (Murphy & Ralston), NRHP-listed
- Western Old People's Home
- Whittier School, 1500 Third St. W., Waterloo, (Ralston, John G.), NRHP-listed
- One or more works in the Waterloo East Commercial Historic District
