= Waterloo Public Library-East Side Branch =

- U.S. National Register of Historic Places
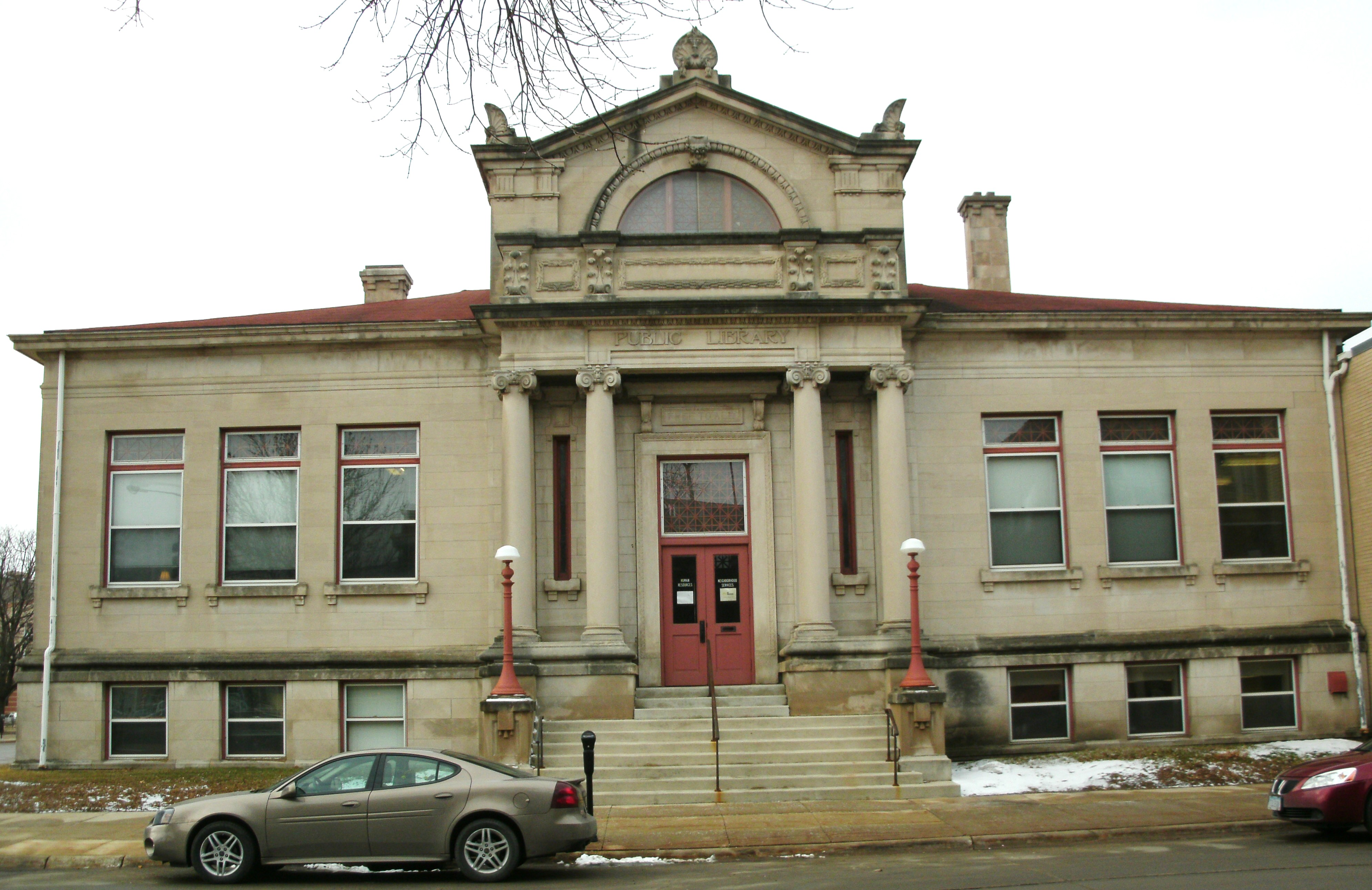

- Location within Iowa Location within the United States
- Location: 626 Mulberry St. Waterloo, Iowa
- Coordinates: 42°29′57″N 92°20′0.3″W
- Area: less than one acre
- Built: 1905
- Architect: John G. Ralston
- Architectural style: Classical Revival
- MPS: Waterloo MPS
- NRHP reference No.: 88001323
- Added to NRHP: November 29, 1988

The Waterloo Public Library-East Side Branch is a historic building located in Waterloo, Iowa, United States. The public library was established here in 1896. It operated out of two rented rooms, one on the east side of the Cedar River and other on the west side. The Carnegie Foundation offered a grant of $30,000 to build a new library, but disagreements erupted over whether to place the building on the east side or west side of the river. They then agreed to grant $40,000 for a mid-river building, or the same amount for two buildings. In the end they agreed to grant the community $24,000 to build this building and a similar amount for the west side branch. Waterloo architect John G. Ralston designed both buildings in the Neoclassical style. Both were dedicated on February 23, 1906. The single-story Bedford stone structure was built over a raised basement. It is one of the few stone buildings in Waterloo. The building has a central portico with paired Ionic columns. It is part of a larger central mass that is oriented from front to back and sits across the lower hipped roof.

In 1977 voters in Waterloo approved a $3,650,000 bond referendum to renovate the city's 1938 post office and federal building to house the library. The post office vacated the building in 1979 when it relocated. The old library building was listed on the National Register of Historic Places in 1988. The building is now used by the city of Waterloo.
