= North Grand Avenue Residential Historic District =

Historic district in Iowa, United States

- U.S. National Register of Historic Places
- U.S. Historic district
- Location within Iowa Location within the United States
- Location: Roughly along N. Grand Ave. from 9th to 18th streets and between 1st Ave. W. and 1st Ave. E., Spencer, Iowa
- Coordinates: 43°09′04.6″N 95°08′43.4″W
- Area: 17.6 acres (7.1 ha)
- NRHP reference No.: 14000212
- Added to NRHP: May 19, 2014

North Grand Avenue Residential Historic District is a nationally recognized historic district located in Spencer, Iowa, United States. It was listed on the National Register of Historic Places in 2014. At the time of its nomination, the district consisted of 118 resources, including 96 contributing buildings, one contributing structure, 12 noncontributing buildings, and two noncontributing structures. The district is an 11 block area north of the city's central business district. North Grand is a tree-lined street divided by a landscaped boulevard and features Art Deco light fixtures. Its design was influenced by the City Beautiful movement. The thoroughfare carries U.S. Route 71/18 traffic. The contributing buildings are houses, garages, and four churches. Architectural styles found here are Queen Anne, Victorian, Classical Revival, Colonial Revival, Greek Revival, American Four Square, Tudor Revival, Bungalow, and American Craftsman. Many of the buildings are architect-designed. One of the houses in the district, the Adams-Higgins House (1884, 1912), was individually listed on the National Register in 1984.
