= Waterloo Public Library (West Branch) =

- U.S. National Register of Historic Places
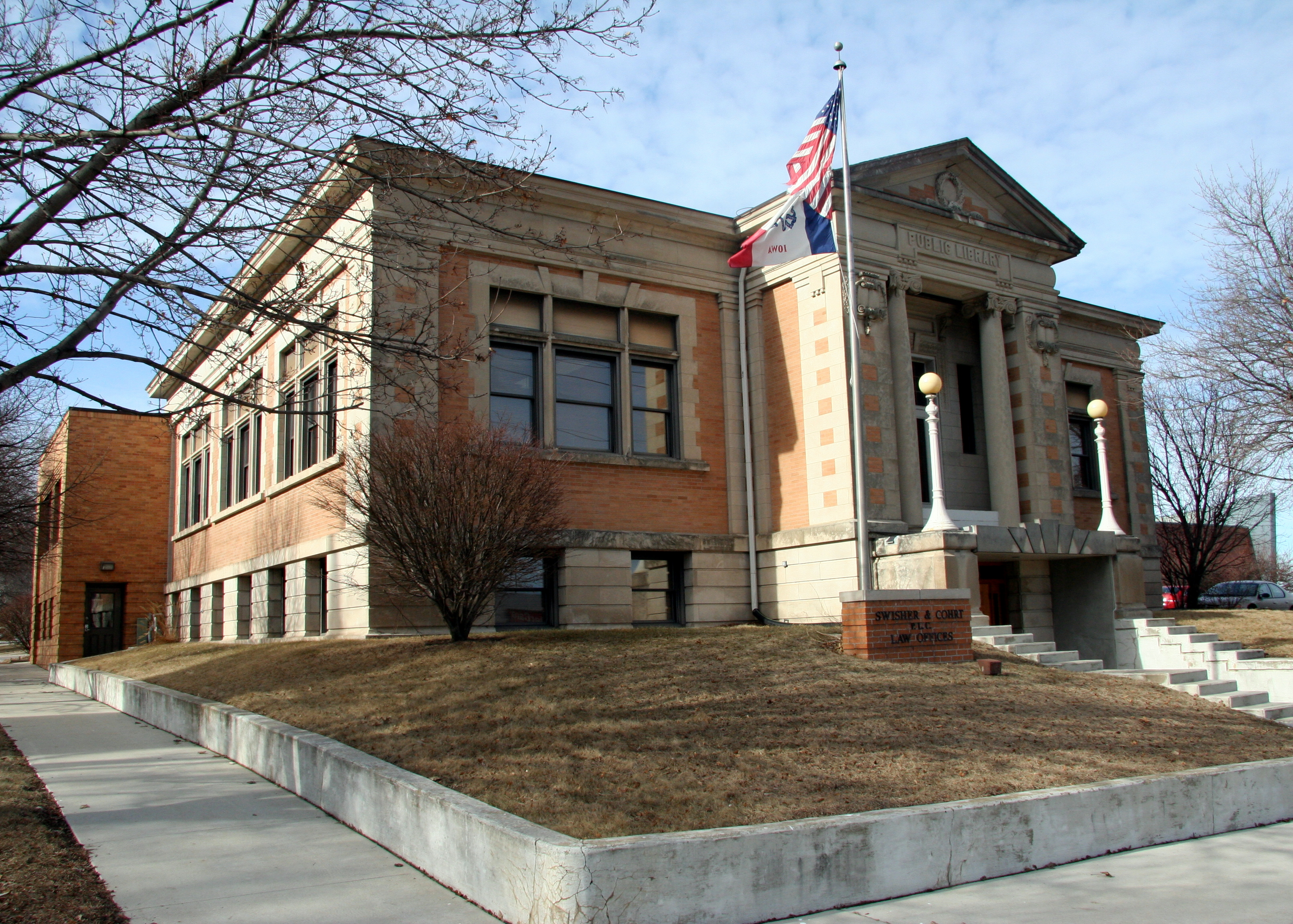

- Location within Iowa Location within the United States
- Location: 528 W. 4th St. Waterloo, Iowa
- Coordinates: 42°29′32.3″N 92°20′36.8″W
- Area: less than one acre
- Built: 1905
- Architect: J.G. Ralston
- Architectural style: Classical Revival
- MPS: Public Library Buildings in Iowa TR
- NRHP reference No.: 83000342
- Added to NRHP: May 23, 1983

The Waterloo Public Library is a historic building located in Waterloo, Iowa, United States. The public library was established there in 1896. It operated out of two rented rooms, one on the east side of the Cedar River and other on the west side. The Carnegie Foundation agreed to grant the community $21,000 to build this building and a similar amount for the east side branch on April 11, 1902. Waterloo architect J.G. Ralston designed both buildings in the Neoclassical style. They were both dedicated on February 23, 1906. The single-story brick structure has a projecting entrance pavilion capped with a triangular pediment that is supported by Ionic columns. Also noteworthy are the corner piers that feature bands of brick squares set into the stone. In 1977 voters in Waterloo approved a $3,650,000 bond referendum to renovate the city's 1938 post office and federal building to house the library. The post office vacated the building in 1979 when it relocated. The old library building was listed on the National Register of Historic Places in 1983. It now houses law offices.
