= H. W. Zeidler =

American architect

Henry Wesley Zeidler (January 2, 1859 – 1951) was an architect in Muscatine, Iowa. He designed Hotel Tipton in Tipton, Iowa and Greenwood Cemetery Chapel in Muscatine, both of which are listed on the National Register of Historic Places.

His father, William Zeidler, was a builder in Muscatine for more than 30 years. Henry Zeidler's brother Charles worked with him and Henry Zeidler designed many of the buildings his father constructed.

== Work ==
- Greenwood Cemetery Chapel, 1814 Lucas in Muscatine
- Hotel Tipton, 524-527 Cedar Street in Tipton, Iowa
- Muscatine City Hall building (1908)
- Lincoln School addition (1907)
- Residences in Columbia Junction and near Letts, Iowa
- 2-story school (1913) in Muscatine
- School in Wolton Iowa and addition to Muscatine school
- Building for Samuel Batterson in Muscatine, 3-story tone and brick building
- M. C. McBride home (1897) in Muscatine
- Iowa Telephone Company building in Muscatine
- Brick skating rink (1907) in Muscatine
- County asylum and poor house (1903) in Boone, Iowa
- Nichols Townsend house
