= Hand County Courthouse and Jail =

United States historic place

- U.S. National Register of Historic Places
- Location within South Dakota Location within the United States
- Location: 415 W. First Ave., Miller, South Dakota
- Coordinates: 44°31′23″N 98°59′41″W
- Area: less than one acre
- Built: 1927, 1931
- Built by: Currie Construction Co.
- Architect: John G. Ralston
- Architectural style: Art Deco
- MPS: County Courthouses of South Dakota MPS
- NRHP reference No.: 94000193
- Added to NRHP: March 17, 1994

The Hand County Courthouse and Jail, located at 415 W. First Ave. in Miller, South Dakota, was listed on the National Register of Historic Places in 1994. The Art Deco courthouse was built in 1927.

The courthouse is 70 by 100 feet (21 m × 30 m) in plan and is 51 feet (16 m) tall (from first floor to roof).

The jail and residence is also built in Art Deco style, and was built in 1931 of Bedford stone. It is 71 by 49 feet (22 m × 15 m) in plan.
