= Downey Savings Bank =

- U.S. National Register of Historic Places
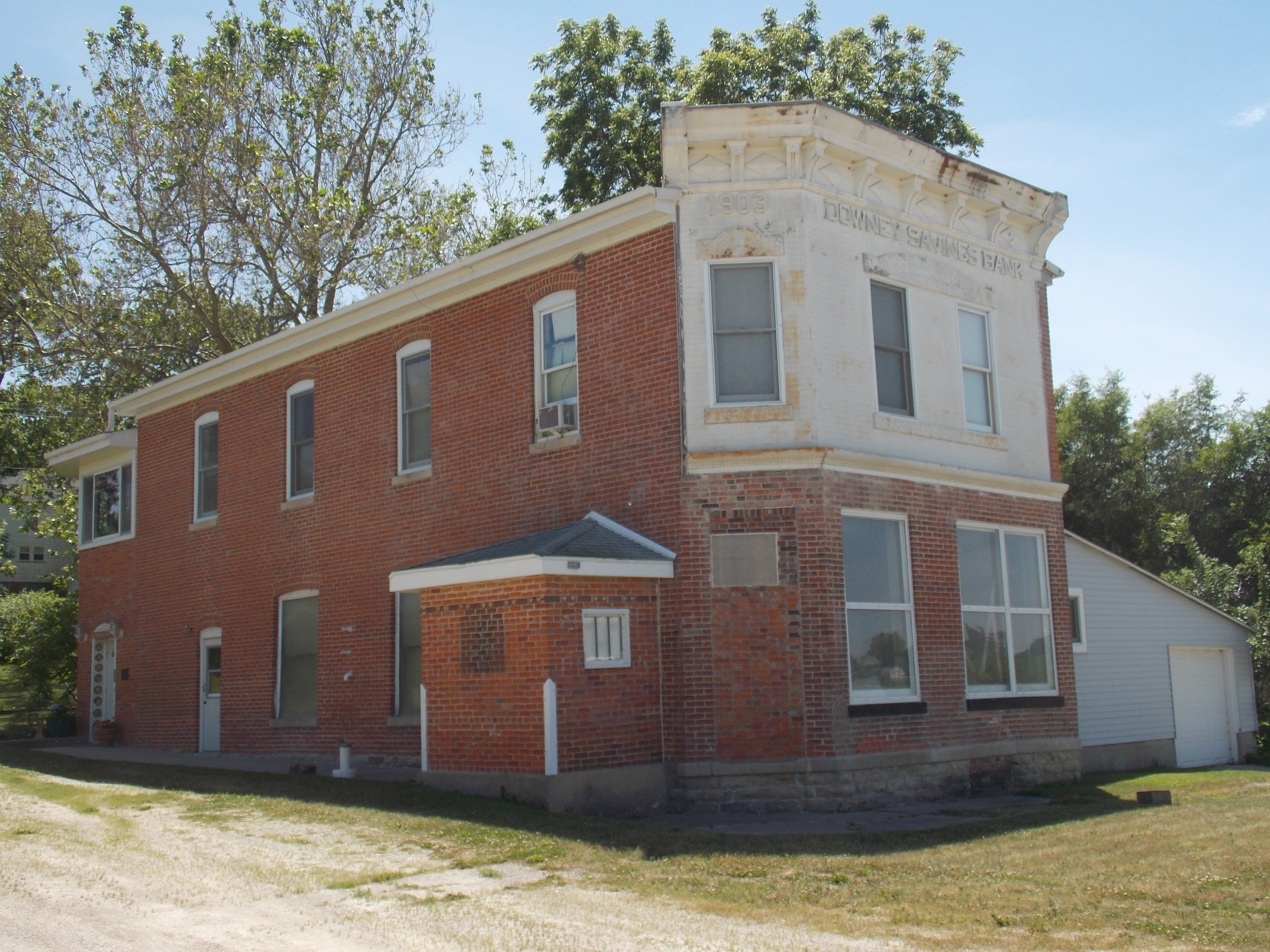
- The historic bank located near downtown Downey on Front Street

- Location within Iowa Location within the United States
- Location: Front St. Downey, Iowa
- Coordinates: 41°36′58.24″N 91°20′58.87″W
- Area: approximately 1 acre (0.40 ha)
- Built: 1903
- NRHP reference No.: 76000740
- Added to NRHP: July 12, 1976

Downey Savings Bank is a historic building located in the unincorporated community of Downey, Iowa, United States. The bank was charted and this building was constructed in 1903. The two-story, brick building is an example of an early twentieth century commercial bank building. At the time it was built the town had several other businesses. The bank continued in operation until 1932 when it was closed during the National Banking Holiday. Because its capital was not large enough to meet the new federal banking regulations it was consolidated with the West Liberty Bank. John Bashor opened a grocery-hardware store in the building in 1935, and operated it here until 1961. The building housed a grocery store from 1961 to 1972. After an attempt to convert it into a pool hall and cabinet shop, it became a pottery in the mid 1970s. The building was listed on the National Register of Historic Places in 1976.
