= Black Hawk County Soldiers Memorial Hall =

- U.S. National Register of Historic Places
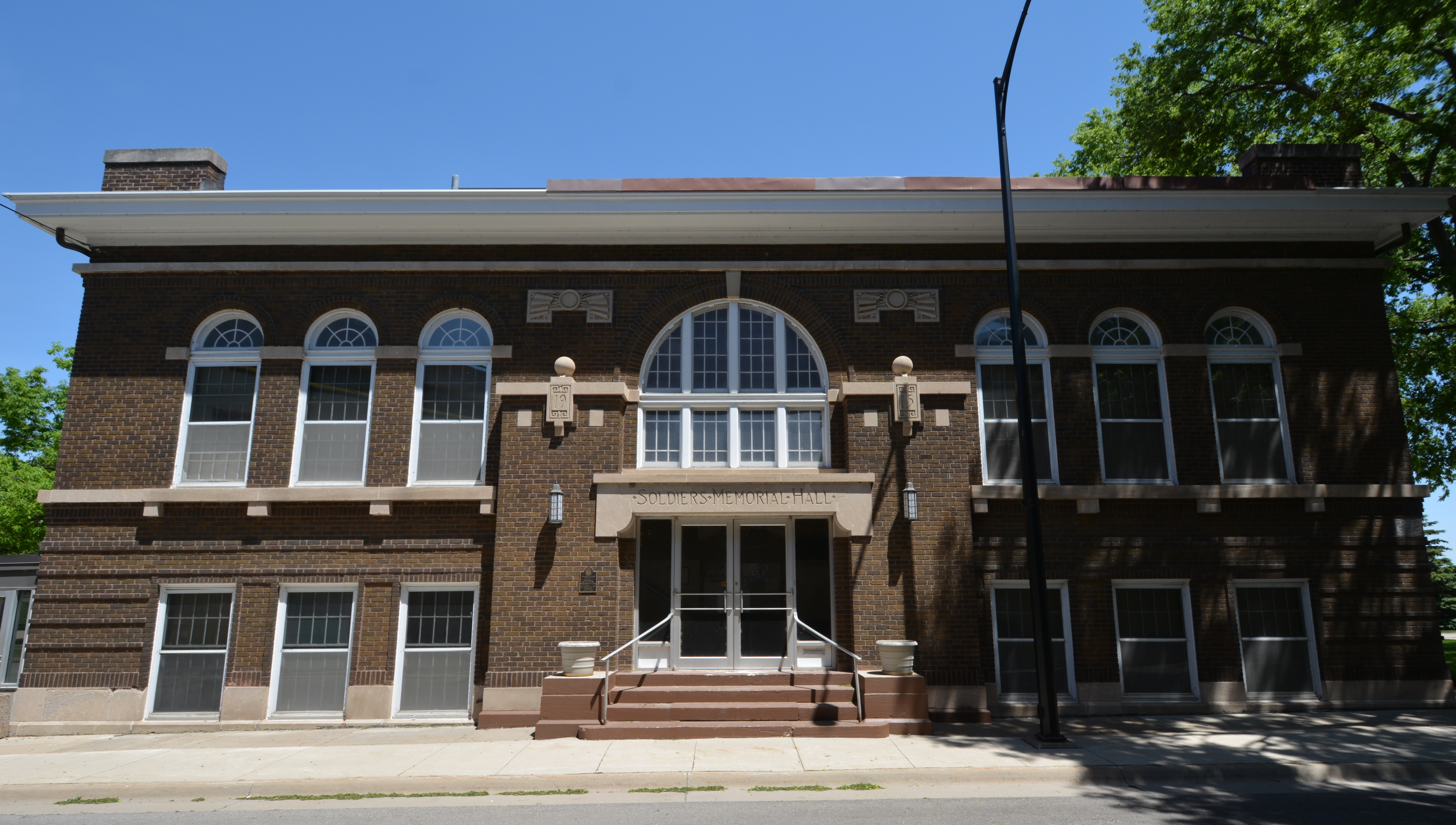

- Location within Iowa Location within the United States
- Location: 1915 Courbat Ct. In honor of both the date (1915) the building was erected and Marsha Courbat, a WWII Women's Military Corps Veteran and 20 plus year VMH Commissioner. Waterloo, Iowa
- Coordinates: 42°29′43″N 92°20′18″W
- Built: 1916
- Architect: John G. Ralston
- Architectural style: Classical Revival
- NRHP reference No.: 88001322
- Added to NRHP: November 29, 1988

The Black Hawk County Soldiers Memorial Hall, also known as Veterans Memorial Hall, is a Classical Revival veterans hall located at 1915 Courbat Ct. in downtown Waterloo, Black Hawk County, Iowa. It was built starting in June 1915 and first meeting was held there in December of the same year by the Grand Army of the Republic as a memorial to soldiers who died in the American Civil War. It was listed on the National Register of Historic Places in 1988 due to its architecture and importance in local history.

== History ==
Black Hawk County Soldiers Memorial Hall was built by the Grand Army of the Republic (G.A.R.) in 1915. Local chapters of the G.A.R. from Cedar Falls, La Porte City, and Waterloo built the hall as a memorial to soldiers who had lost their lives in the American Civil War. The total construction cost was $17,267.27 with a special Blackhawk County tax levy in the amount of $14,000. to help with the fundraising. When ground was broken for construction, current newspapers and membership lists of local patriotic organizations and G.A.R. posts were placed inside the cornerstone. A Cedar Falls resident, H. R. Griffith, was originally supposed to speak at the 1916 dedication ceremony, but could not due to being ill. She was the Department Secretary of the Woman's Relief Corps, which is part of the Grand Army of the Republic. The role was then taken by a resident of Iowa Falls, who was previously the Department President.

== Design and features ==
The building was designed in the Classical Revival style by John G. Ralston, a prominent local architect in Waterloo. It was influenced in part by the work of the American Prairie School architect, George W. Maher.

The building has two stories and includes a kitchen, a dining room, and meeting rooms. The second floor houses a library that now includes a display of Civil War uniforms, artifacts, medals and weapons.

The building is located adjacent to the Cedar River and upon Waterloo's Soldiers and Sailors Park. The park includes a plaza with over 3000 bricks with veterans names inscribed upon them in an area referred to as “ The Veterans Walk of Honor”. Also included are a Georgian marble water fountain, numerous limestone monuments, picnic tables, and a miniature Statue of Liberty donated by the Boy Scouts of America in 1950.

== Historic designation and recent history ==
The Black Hawk County Soldiers Memorial Hall was nominated to the National Register of Historic Places (NRHP) in 1987. The nomination was based on the fact that other Veteran Memorial Halls had been significantly altered in various respects, whereas the Waterloo facility had substantially maintained its original appearance and integrity. The nomination was accepted, and the building was listed on the NRHP in 1988.

When John Kerry ran for President of the United States in 2004, he visited the building to hold a meeting, in which he stated that he wanted veterans to be "a driving force leading up to Iowa's caucuses. ". Many other past Presidents have visited The Hall including George W. Bush and Joe Biden when he run for president in 2008.

In May 2011, a POW-MIA monument was unveiled in the park near the hall. The hall is also the site of local Law Enforcement Memorial Remembrance Day, National Memorial Day, Veterans Day, and Veteran Reunion commemorations.
