= Downey School =

- U.S. National Register of Historic Places
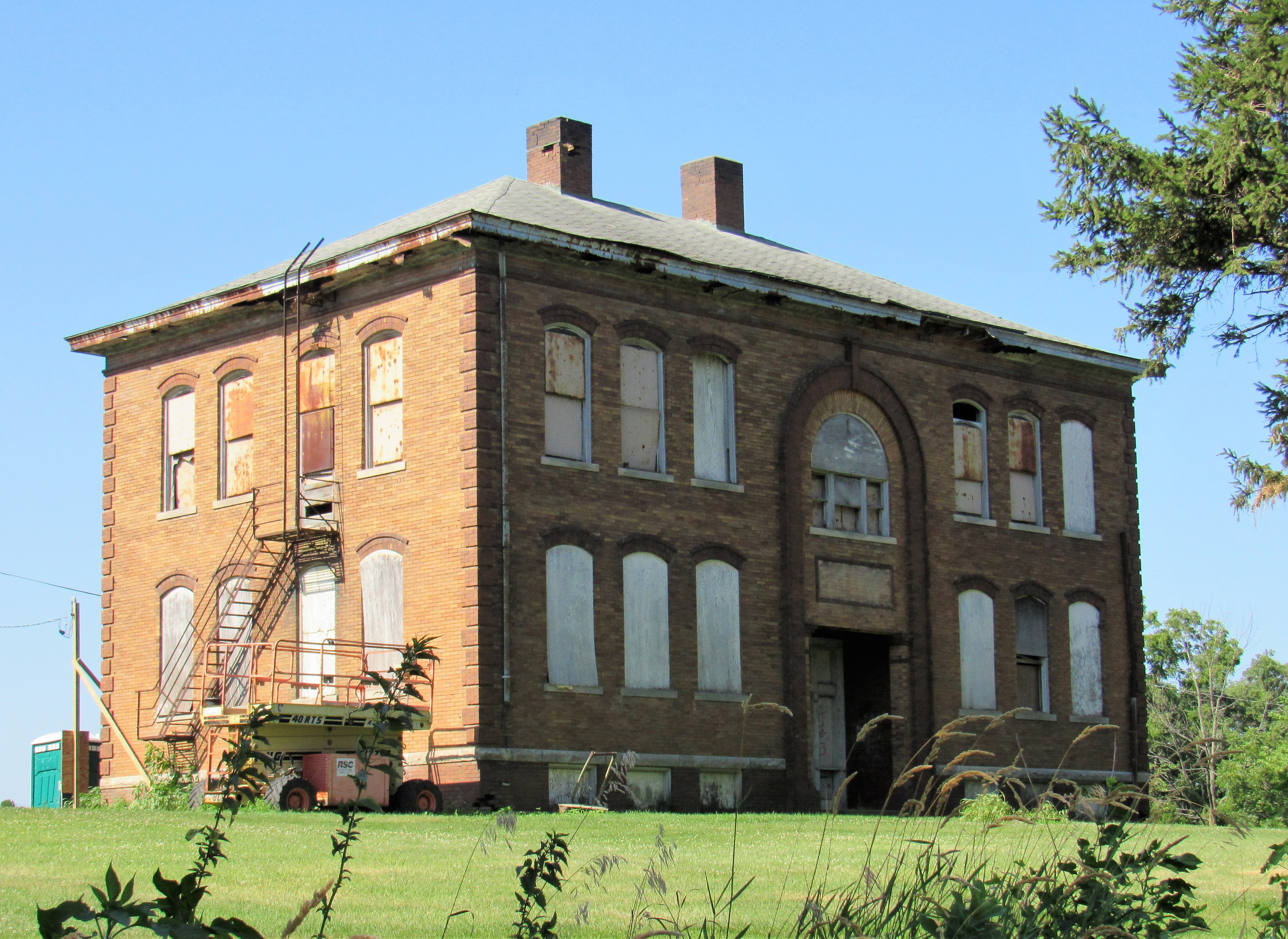

- Location within Iowa Location within the United States
- Location: 212 Broadway St. Downey, Iowa
- Coordinates: 41°36′54″N 91°20′56.4″W
- Built: 1905
- Built by: Frank Chapman
- Architect: J.G. Ralston
- NRHP reference No.: 100004017
- Added to NRHP: May 28, 2019

Downey School is a historic building located in the unincorporated community of Downey, Iowa, United States. Built in four months in 1905, it was designed by Waterloo, Iowa architect J.G. Ralston and built by Frank Chapman, also of Waterloo. The two-story brick structure features quoins on the corners and Roman arches as its main decorative elements. The building had a cupola, but that was taken down at some point. It is believed that the building originally housed 1st through 12th grades. After 20 years the high school grades were moved to West Branch, Iowa. The school itself closed in 1955. The Wapsie Valley Grange Society acquired the building and they used it for their meetings into the 1970s.

Tim and Madonna Rex bought the building from the Iowa Grange Society in 2017 and since then have been in the process of converting it into a bed and breakfast inn. The building was listed on the National Register of Historic Places in 2019.
