= Springdale Township, Cedar County, Iowa =

Township in Iowa, US

Springdale Township, Cedar County
- Township
- Coordinates: 41°38′30″N 091°18′29″W
- Country: United States
- State: Iowa
- County: Cedar

Area
  - Total: 36.37 sq mi (94.21 km^{2})
  - Land: 36.37 sq mi (94.21 km^{2})
  - Water: 0 sq mi (0 km^{2})
- Elevation: 719 ft (219 m)

Population (2000)
  - Total: 2,857
  - Density: 78/sq mi (30.3/km^{2})
- FIPS code: 19-93975
- GNIS feature ID: 0468739

Springdale Township is one of seventeen townships in Cedar County, Iowa, United States. As of the 2000 census, its population was 2,857.

== History ==
Springdale Township was established in 1853. Springdale Township was an important point on the Underground Railroad.

== Geography ==
Springdale Township covers an area of 36.37 square miles (94.2 km^{2}) and contains one incorporated settlement, West Branch. According to the USGS, it contains six cemeteries: Chamness, Downey, Hickory Grove, Old Friends, Springdale and West Branch. The unincorporated community of Springdale was historically important in the anti-slavery movement.
