= Greenwood Cemetery Chapel =

Historic site in Muscatine County, Iowa

- U.S. National Register of Historic Places
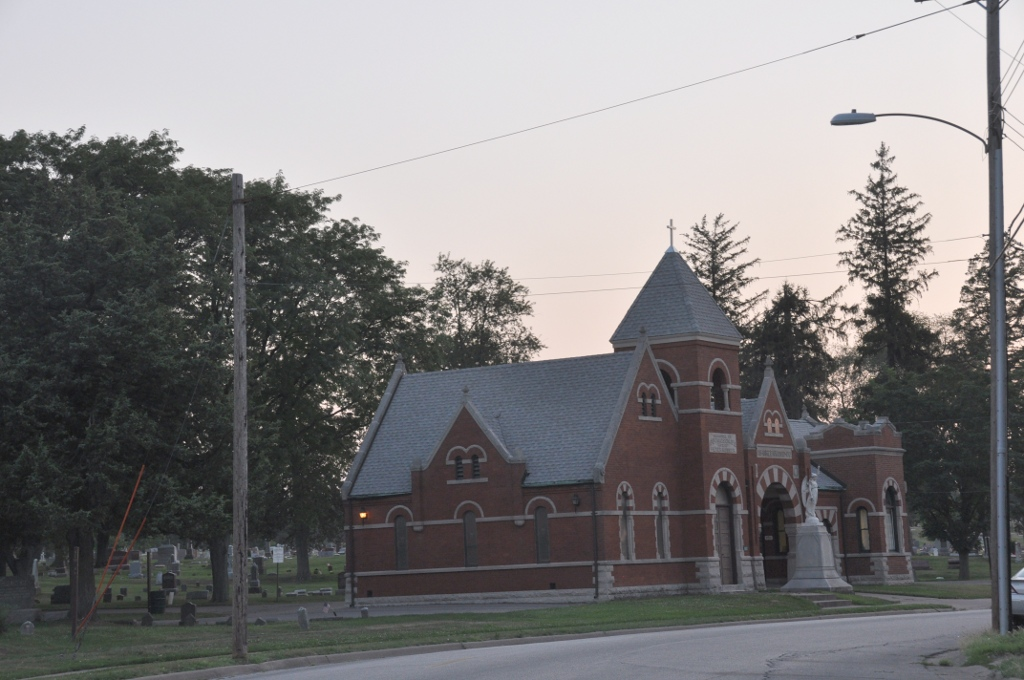

- Location within Iowa Location within the United States
- Location: 1814 Lucas; Muscatine, Iowa
- Coordinates: 41°25′12″N 91°03′50″W
- Area: less than one acre
- Built: 1901
- Architect: Henry W. Zeidler
- Architectural style: Richardsonian Romanesque
- NRHP reference No.: 01001013
- Added to NRHP: September 21, 2001

Greenwood Cemetery Chapel is an historic building in Muscatine, Iowa, United States. It has been listed on the National Register of Historic Places since 2001.

== History ==
The chapel was a given to the city of Muscatine by a local businessman and philanthropist, Peter Musser, as a gift in memory of his wife Tamson. It was designed by Muscatine architect Henry W. Zeidler, who also designed Hotel Tipton in Tipton, Iowa, and built by J.E. Howe who was also from Muscatine. The chapel was dedicated on May 12, 1901. Musser also donated the statue of Hope that was placed near the entrance of the chapel. He commissioned Becke and Wilson, a Muscatine marble works company, to create the statue in 1902. A second tower was added to the structure in 1912.

== Architecture ==
The Richardsonian Romanesque chapel is composed of two wings that are connected by a porte-cochere. It features a rough-faced asymmetrical facade, recessed windows, alternating bands of brick and stone, high gabled roofs, and wide arches located over the windows and doors.

A bell tower, part of the original structure, is located on the corner of the front-gabled east wing. A small tower was added to the west wing. The chapel is used for funeral services, seats 100 people, and is located in the east wing. The west wing contains office space.
