= Whittier School (Waterloo, Iowa) =

- U.S. National Register of Historic Places
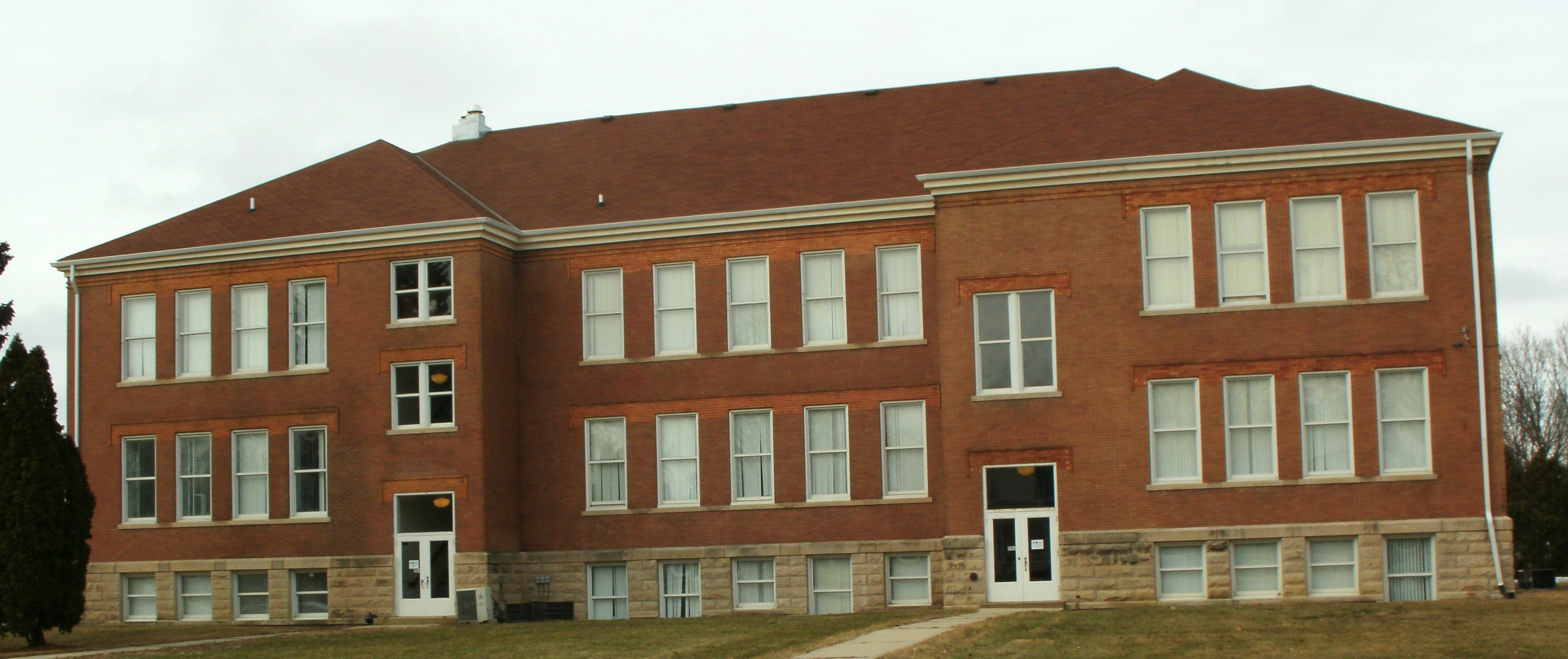

- Location within Iowa Location within the United States
- Location: 1500 3rd St., W. Waterloo, Iowa
- Coordinates: 42°29′13.6″N 92°21′23.4″W
- Area: 3 acres (1.2 ha)
- Built: 1906, 1909, 1915
- Architect: John G. Ralston
- Architectural style: Renaissance Revival
- MPS: Waterloo MPS
- NRHP reference No.: 04001400
- Added to NRHP: December 30, 2004

Whittier School is a historic building located in Waterloo, Iowa, United States. The city's west side began a period of rapid growth in the 1890s. By 1904 the property for this school had been purchased for $9,270. Waterloo architect John G. Ralston designed this and the new Emerson School at the same time, and they both opened in 1906. Whitter was part of the development of Waterloo's streetcar subdivisions during the city's housing boom from 1900 to 1920. It was built in four phases between 1906 and 1915. Its H-shape design is an example of the "Platoon School" design, which was meant to improve the health and education of the students by providing more windows for better ventilation and lighting. The structure is also reminiscent of the American Foursquare houses in the surrounding neighborhoods. The building was closed in 1981, and it was later sold. It was listed on the National Register of Historic Places in 2004. The former school has been converted into apartments for low to moderate income people.
