= Clement B. Gingrich House =

Historic house in Iowa, United States

- U.S. National Register of Historic Places
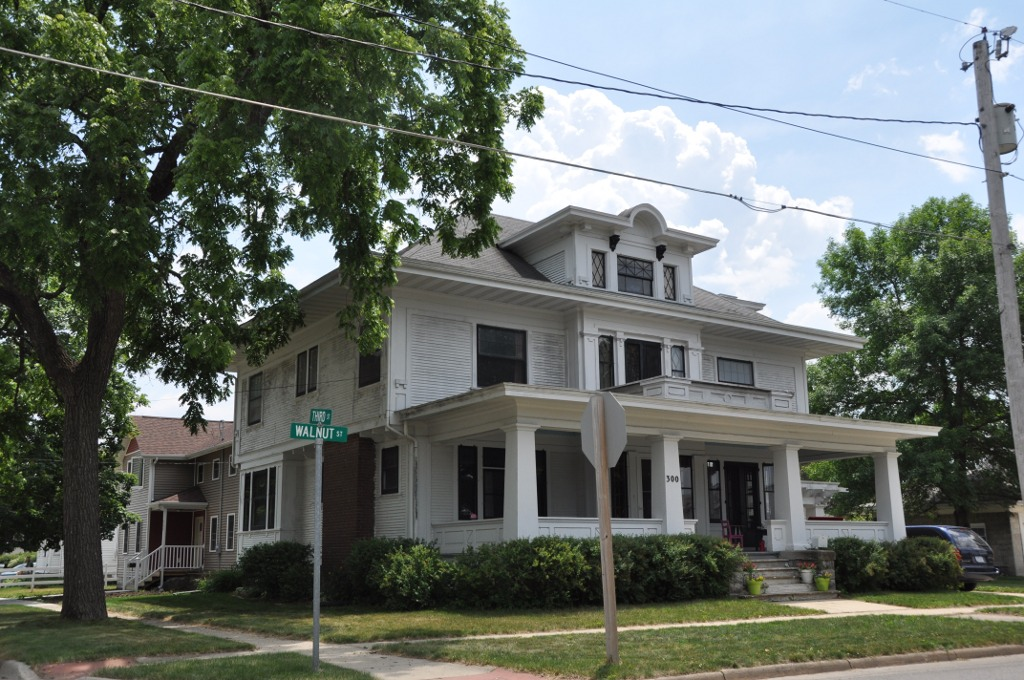

- Location within Iowa Location within the United States
- Location: 300 Walnut St. La Porte City, Iowa
- Coordinates: 42°18′50.4″N 92°11′18.3″W
- Area: less than one acre
- Built: 1916
- Architect: John G. Ralston
- Architectural style: Late 19th and 20th Century Revivals; Late 19th & 20th Century American Movements
- NRHP reference No.: 96001371
- Added to NRHP: December 4, 1996

The Clement B. Gingrich House is a historic building located in La Porte City, Iowa, United States. Gingrich grew up on a nearby farm, and was a teacher before he operated the family's creamery. He hired Waterloo architect J.G. Ralston to design this house, which was completed in 1916. Architecturally, the two-story frame structure is "transitional" in its design. It features Georgian cube massing, with Prairie School, American Craftsman and Colonial Revival influences. The house was sold after the death of Ella Gingrich in 1943. It served as the rectory for Sacred Heart Catholic Church from 1946 to 1973. During that time the basement was used for a daily Mass chapel and catechism classes. Twenty-seven interdenominational weddings were celebrated in the house. After its use as a rectory it reverted to being a single-family home. It was listed on the National Register of Historic Places in 1996.
