= Adams-Higgins House =

Historic house in Iowa, United States

- U.S. National Register of Historic Places
- U.S. Historic district – Contributing property
- Location within Iowa Location within the United States
- Location: 1215 Grand Ave. Spencer, Iowa
- Coordinates: 43°09′0.8″N 95°08′45″W
- Area: less than one acre
- Built: 1884, 1912
- Architect: J. G. Ralston (1911 remodeling plans)
- Architectural style: Classical Revival; Late Victorian
- Part of: North Grand Avenue Residential Historic District (ID14000212)
- NRHP reference No.: 84001214
- Added to NRHP: September 27, 1984

The Adams-Higgins House is a historic home in Spencer, Iowa, United States. It is located at 1215 Grand Avenue. The home is also referred to as the Higgins House or Higgins Mansion. The house is architecturally unusual because it was built as a late Victorian style house in 1884, then substantially renovated in 1912 with addition of neo-classical porches and roofline.

In 1984, it was individually listed on the National Register of Historic Places. At the time the property retained historic landscaping and a 32 feet (9.8 m) by 29 feet (8.8 m) playhouse from c. 1917–18. In 2014 it was included as a contributing property in the North Grand Avenue Residential Historic District.

== History ==
The Adams-Higgins house, known locally as the Higgins Mansion or simply The Mansion, was built in 1884 by J.Q. Adams, a local farmer, banker, land developer, and 1889-1890 Spencer Mayor. Mr. Adams bought block 22 from his business partner for $350. The property (whole block) was sold in 1900 to Amanda Bender, who never resided in the house, who sold the house to Mr. and Mrs. William Higgins, newlyweds who had moved to Spencer from Chicago. In 1902 Higgins were sold the rest of the block. They contracted architect J. G. Ralston of Waterloo, Iowa to make the home an architectural landmark, beginning in 1911, by adding massive Neo-classical columns, adding a third floor, iron fence surround, and a kidney-shaped fish pond. In 1917 the playhouse was built for the Higgins children, who adopted off the Orphan Train when it passed through Spencer. For a short period, the playhouse was used as a classroom for children attending a nearby elementary school undergoing repairs. In 1947 the west 125 feet of the block were given to the First Congregational Church to build a new church and the playhouse was moved to its current location. Mrs. Higgins died in 1961, and the property was sold at auction in 1962 to Mathilda Delaney. In 1940, Mathilda had established the Delaney Nursing Home in Spencer and operated it until 1975 using the mansion as part of the nursing home. Mrs. Delaney occupied the home until 1983, when the property was sold to Paul and Paula Brenner, who successfully placed the home on the National Register of Historic Places in 1984. The Brenners completed restoration projects on the exterior and interior over the near-15 years of their ownership. The playhouse was renovated in 1993 by the Brenners, and used as their antique shop. The home passed to Drs. Jon and Debora Hade. The kitchen was remodeled and the cabinets used by Mr Higgins were brought up into the kitchen, his handwriting can be seen on one of the shelves. The dining room boasts a mahogany sideboard that runs from floor to ceiling. The painted mural in the dining room are signed by a Chicago artist. The Playhouse which at one time served as a school was moved to its current location and the current garage was built. The current owners Neal and Kitty Conover, completed the renovation work in 2005.
