= Hotel Tipton =

- U.S. National Register of Historic Places
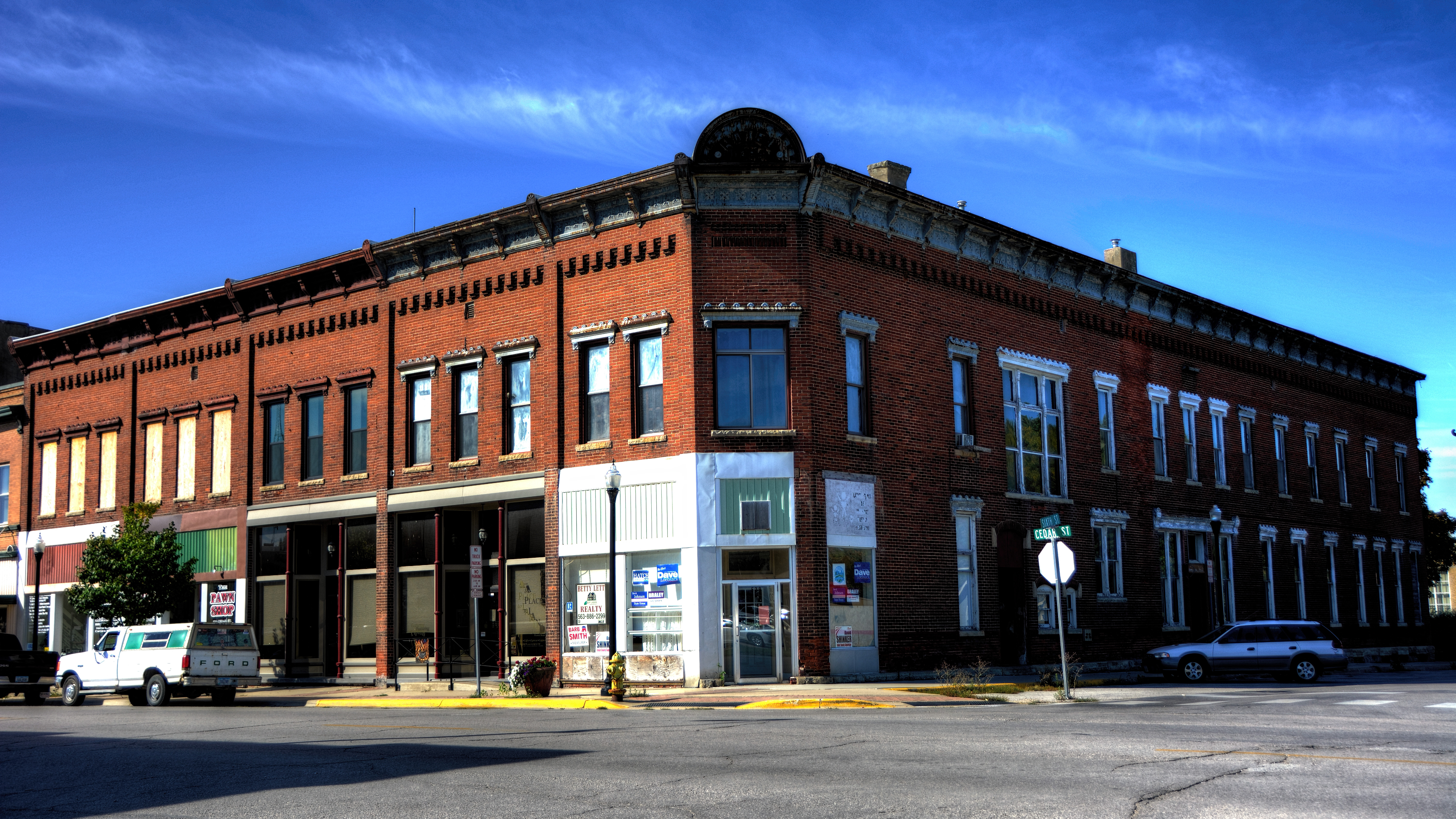

- Location within Iowa Location within the United States
- Location: 524-527 Cedar St. Tipton, Iowa
- Coordinates: 41°46′15″N 91°07′43″W
- Area: less than one acre
- Built: 1894-1895
- Built by: Kelley & Mahan
- Architect: H.W. Zeidler
- Architectural style: Italianate
- NRHP reference No.: 98001328
- Added to NRHP: November 5, 1998

Hotel Tipton is a historic building located in the central business district of Tipton, Iowa, United States. It was listed on the National Register of Historic Places in 1998. Twelve of Tipton's leading citizens perceived the need for a hotel in town, and each subscribed to $1,000.00 worth of stock to build it. Architect H.W. Zeidler, of Muscatine, Iowa, who also designed the Greenwood Cemetery Chapel in Muscatine, was employed to design the two-story, L-shaped building in the Italianate style. Construction began in 1894 and it was completed the following year. The first floor contained the hotel's lobby, office, sample room, dining room, kitchen, pantries, and four retail units. The stable rents of the commercial space made the hotel economically feasible. The second floor housed 35 guest rooms, a parlor, sitting room, two bathrooms and a sample room. In the late 1990s part of the second floor was converted into apartments.
