= Tipton State Bank =

- U.S. National Register of Historic Places
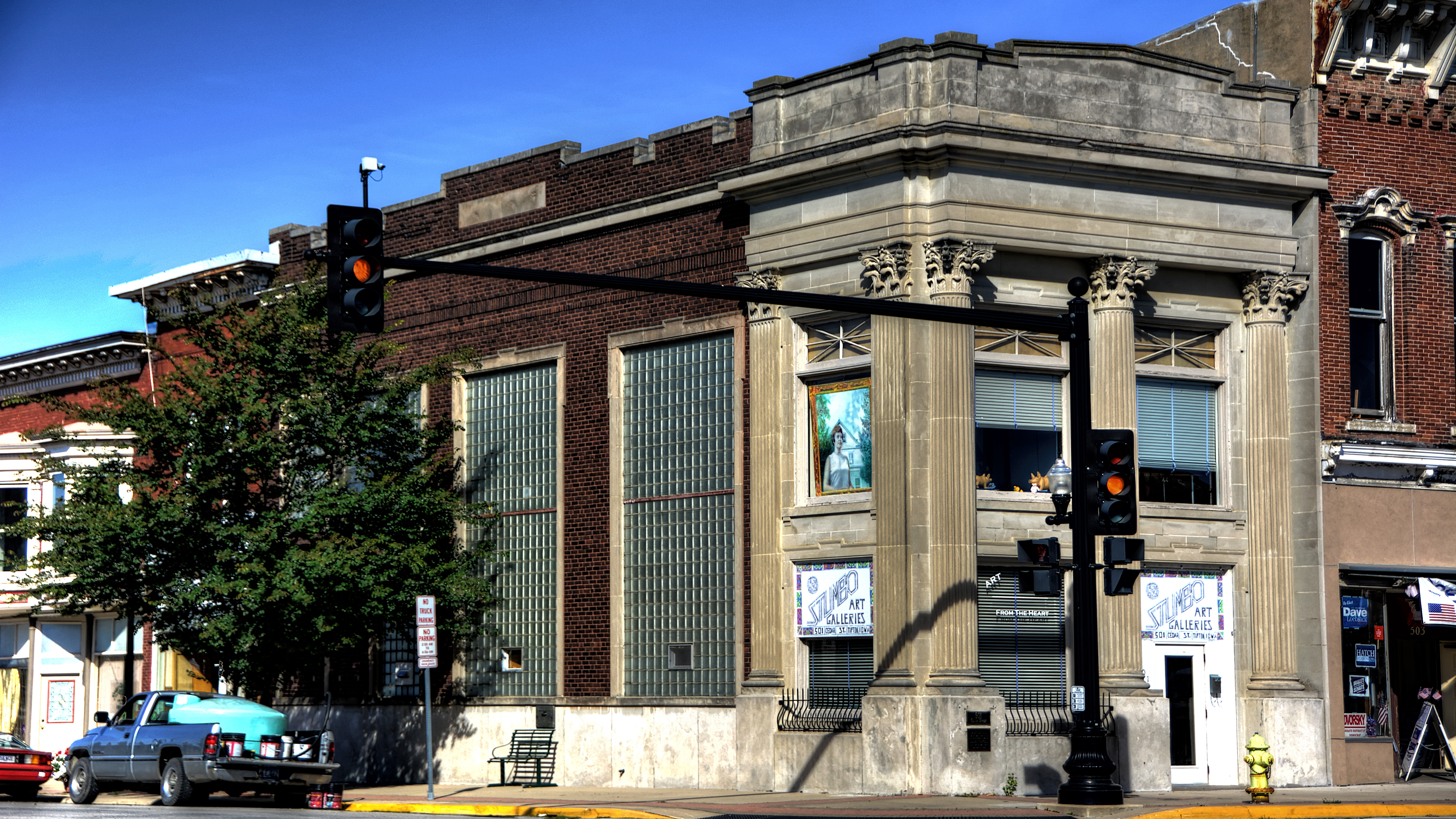

- Location within Iowa Location within the United States
- Location: 501 Cedar St. Tipton, Iowa
- Coordinates: 41°46′12.47″N 91°07′43.33″W
- Area: less than one acre
- Built: 1924
- Architect: J.C. Woods & Co.
- Architectural style: Neoclassical
- NRHP reference No.: 00001075
- Added to NRHP: September 14, 2000

Tipton State Bank is a historic building located in the central business district of Tipton, Iowa, United States. It was listed on the National Register of Historic Places in 2000.

== History ==
A bank on this location in Tipton goes back to 1877. Over the years it was known as Cedar County Bank, First National Bank of Tipton, and City National Bank. The directors of City National Bank voted on March 28, 1923, to build a new bank building. They hired the Clinton, Iowa architectural firm J.C. Woods & Co. to design the Neoclassical style structure. Construction was completed in 1924. The east facade of the two-story building features three columns with capitals in the Corinthian order. Around the corner on the south elevation are two full size pilasters. The windows of that elevation were replaced with glass blocks in 1953. After the National Banking Holiday the bank resumed operations as the Tipton State Bank. It continued to occupy this building until they built a new facility across Cedar Street in 1967.
