= Kreinbring Phillips 66 Gas Station =

- U.S. National Register of Historic Places
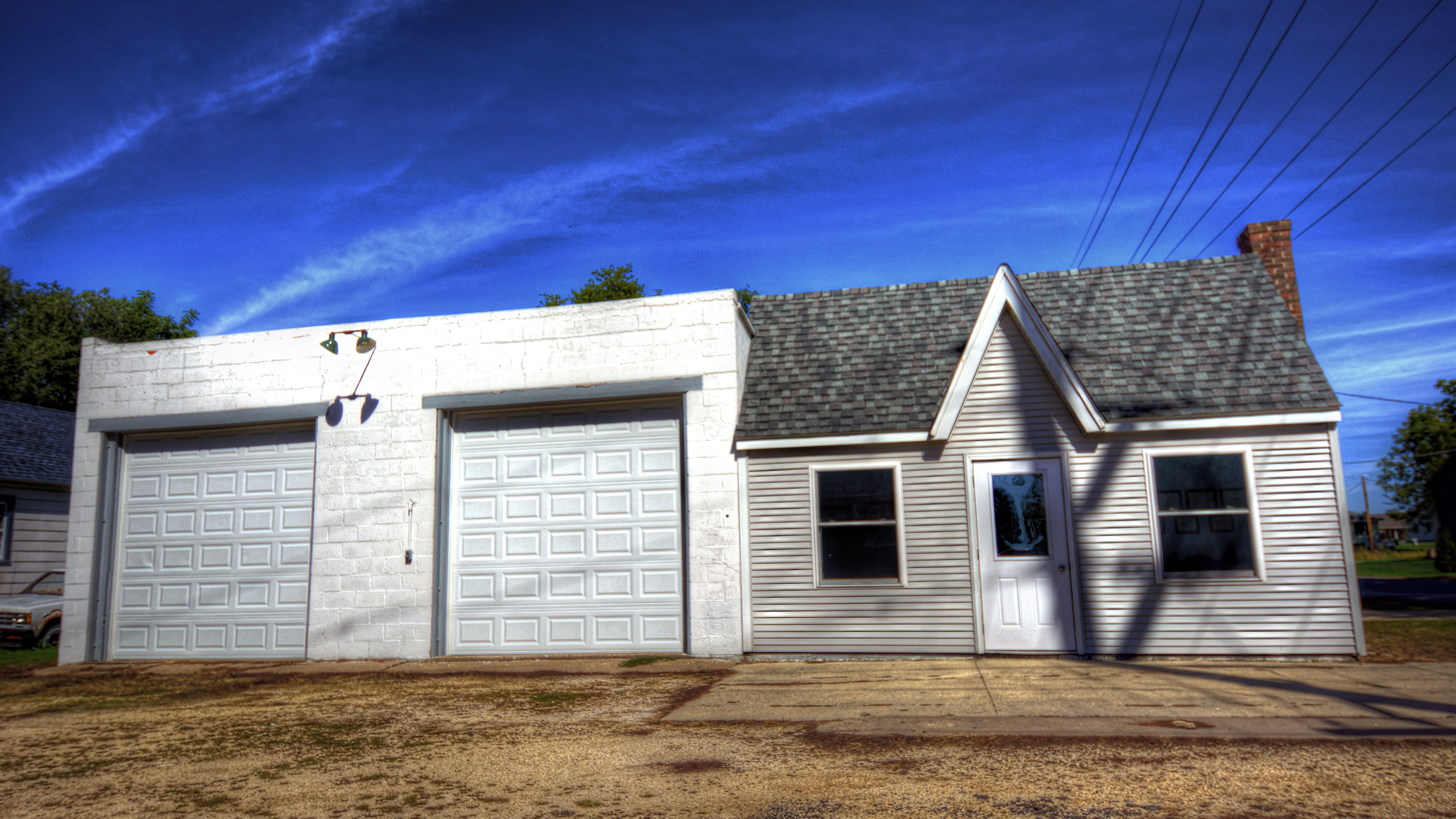

- Location within Iowa
- Location: 200 Main St. Lowden, Iowa
- Coordinates: 41°51′28.17″N 90°55′22.33″W
- Area: less than one acre
- Built: 1934, 1949
- Architectural style: Tudor Revival
- NRHP reference No.: 00000933
- Added to NRHP: August 10, 2000

Kreinbring Phillips 66 Gas Station is a historic building located in Lowden, Iowa, United States. The Lincoln Highway was established in 1913 and passed through Lowden. In Iowa the highway became U.S. Highway 30 (US 30) in the 1920s. The Tudor Revival-style cottage portion of the service station was built alongside of US 30 in 1934 following the specifications of the Phillips Petroleum Company. The gas pumps were located on a concrete median, no longer extant, in front of the station. August L. Kreinbring was the first owner/operator of the station and he created a park-like setting to the west of the station where highway travelers could relax. New owners built the service bay annex on the park area in 1949. The storage room on the north side of the cottage was added at the same time. The station remained in operation through different owners and brands until 1998. It was listed on the National Register of Historic Places in 2000.
