= Henry Weis House =

Historic house in Iowa, United States

- U.S. National Register of Historic Places
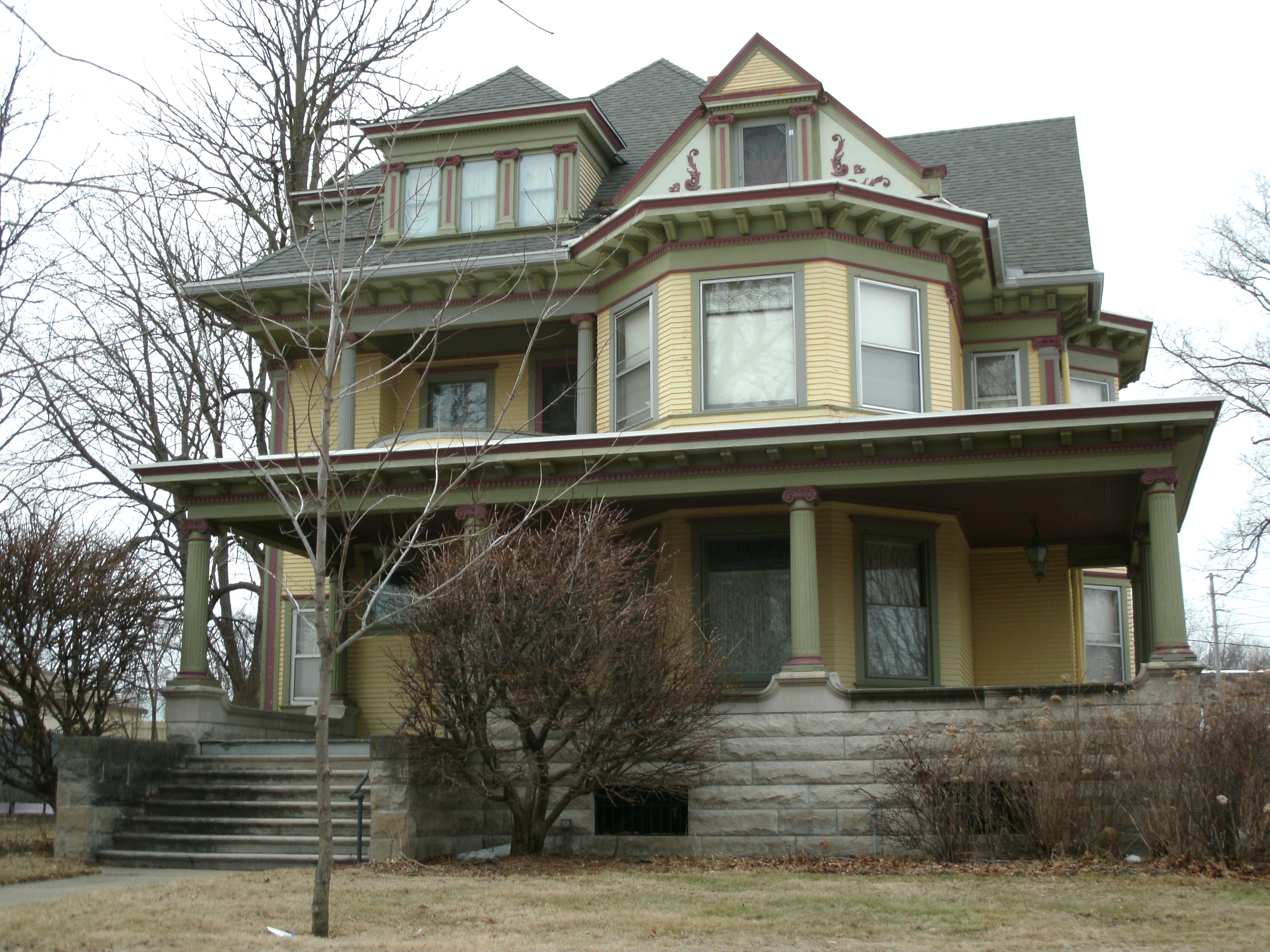

- Location within Iowa Location within the United States
- Location: 800 W. 4th St. Waterloo, Iowa
- Coordinates: 42°29′26.2″N 92°20′46.3″W
- Area: less than one acre
- Built: 1902
- Architect: Murphy & Ralston
- Architectural style: Queen Anne; Colonial Revival
- MPS: Waterloo MPS
- NRHP reference No.: 89001779
- Added to NRHP: October 30, 1989

The Henry Wei’s House is a historic building located in Waterloo, Iowa, United States. Weis was a factory owner that produced egg case fillers, which were used to protect eggs during shipping. He engaged the local architectural firm of Murphy & Ralston to design this house, which was completed in 1902. Architecturally, the two-story frame structure is "transitional" in its design, featuring elements of the Queen Anne and the Colonial Revival styles. The Queen Anne is found in its irregular plan, wraparound porch, full-height bays, small second floor porch, and the small screened porch. The Colonial Revival is found in the Ionic fluted porch columns, and the consoles with a row of dentils located along the cornice. The house also features foliated designs on the gable ends. It remained in the Weis family into the 1930s when it was converted into apartments. It has subsequently been converted into a bed and breakfast. The house was listed on the National Register of Historic Places in 1989.

The home sold in 2022 to owners Christopher and Kelly Schmitz who run it as a Bed and Breakfast. They have a historical marker and several informational displays about the property and the life and business of Henry Weis whose family cemetery plot is also located nearby. The home is listed with the Grout Historical Museum, located only blocks away, as a location of interest but most historical data related to the site are located in the house itself.
