= Sumner High School (Iowa) =

- U.S. National Register of Historic Places
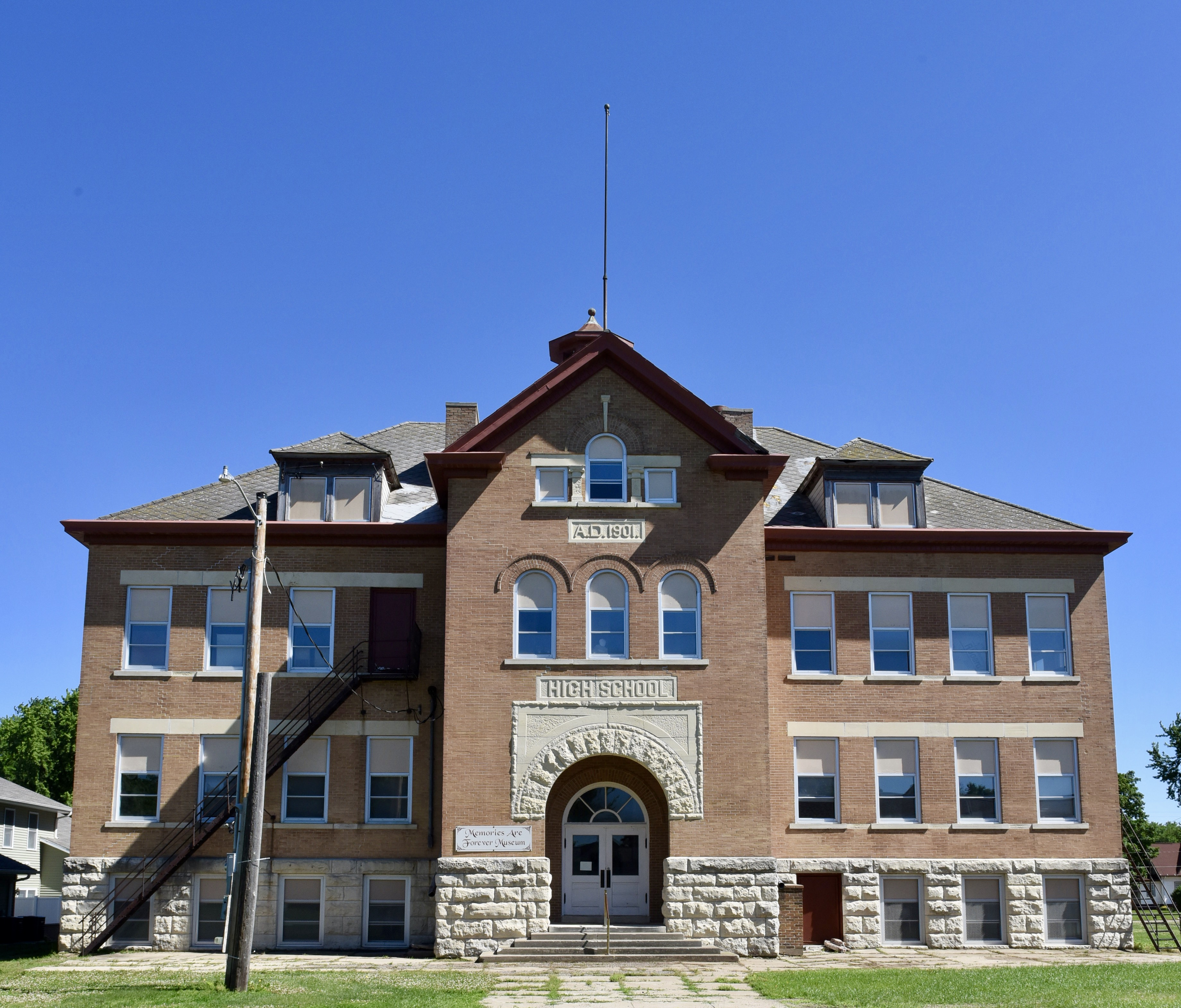

- Location within Iowa Location within the United States
- Location: 300 W. 4th St. Sumner, Iowa
- Coordinates: 42°50′52″N 92°05′56″W
- Area: less than one acre
- Built: 1901
- Architect: Murphy and Ralston
- Architectural style: Classical Revival
- NRHP reference No.: 04000597
- Added to NRHP: August 25, 2004

Sumner High School is a historic building located in Sumner, Iowa, United States. Built in 1901, the Neoclassical style building replaced the old 1876 school building. The 2½-story brick structure is built on a raised stone basement and capped with a hip roof and cupola. An addition was built onto the north side of the building in 1915, and the gymnasium was added in 1924. This was Sumner's only school building until 1953 when a new grade school was built. A new high school building was completed in 1961. The local school district continued to use the building until 1988, and the gymnasium continues to be used by the district. The building was listed on the National Register of Historic Places in 2004.
