= Emerson School (Waterloo, Iowa) =

- U.S. National Register of Historic Places
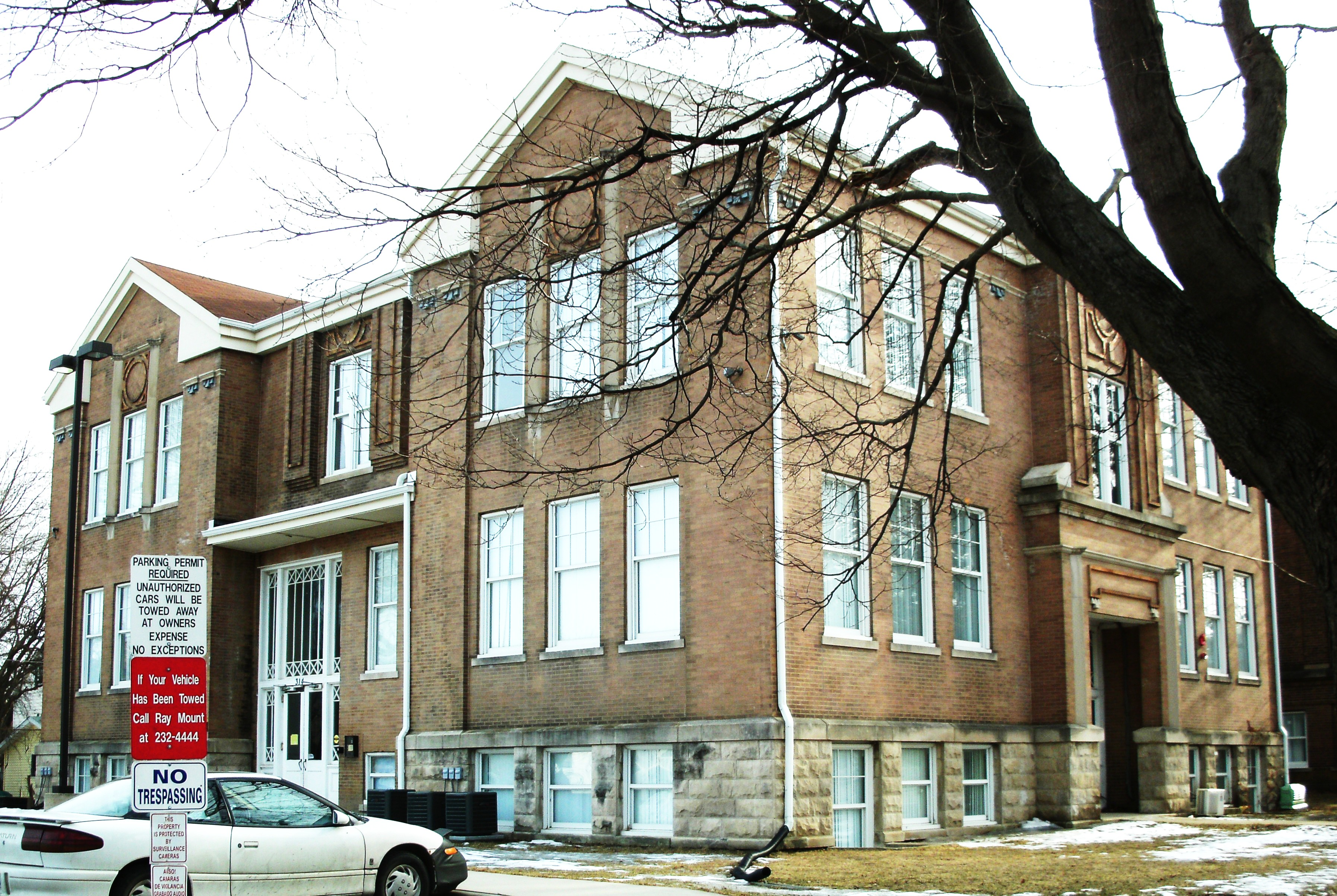
- Original building (1906)

- Location within Iowa Location within the United States
- Location: 314 Randolph St. Waterloo, Iowa
- Coordinates: 42°29′34″N 92°20′52.2″W
- Area: less than one acre
- Built: 1906, 1916
- Architect: John G. Ralston
- Architectural style: Classical Revival; Renaissance Revival
- MPS: Waterloo MPS
- NRHP reference No.: 04001403
- Added to NRHP: December 29, 2004

Emerson School is a historic building located in Waterloo, Iowa, United States. It is oldest extant school campus on the city's west side. Emerson was established in 1893 when its first building was constructed on this property. It was the third school in West Waterloo. The original building was replaced when the present main building was completed in 1906. The annex was built ten years later to accommodate the school's increased enrollment. They are connected by a hyphen. The complex was designed by Waterloo architect John G. Ralston. The original building is a two-story brick structure on a raised limestone basement designed in the Neoclassical style. It features broken pediment gable ends, stylized pilasters on the gable ends of the upper level, Palladian dormers, and corner pilaster capitals. The annex was designed in the Second Renaissance Revival style. It is also a two-story brick structure. Typical of this style the annex features distinct horizontal divisions separated by belt and stringcourses. There is also a parapet frieze across the top. In 1973 the building became Expo Alternative High School. The building was closed in 1981, and it was later sold. It was listed on the National Register of Historic Places in 2004.
