= Downey, Iowa =

- Unincorporated community
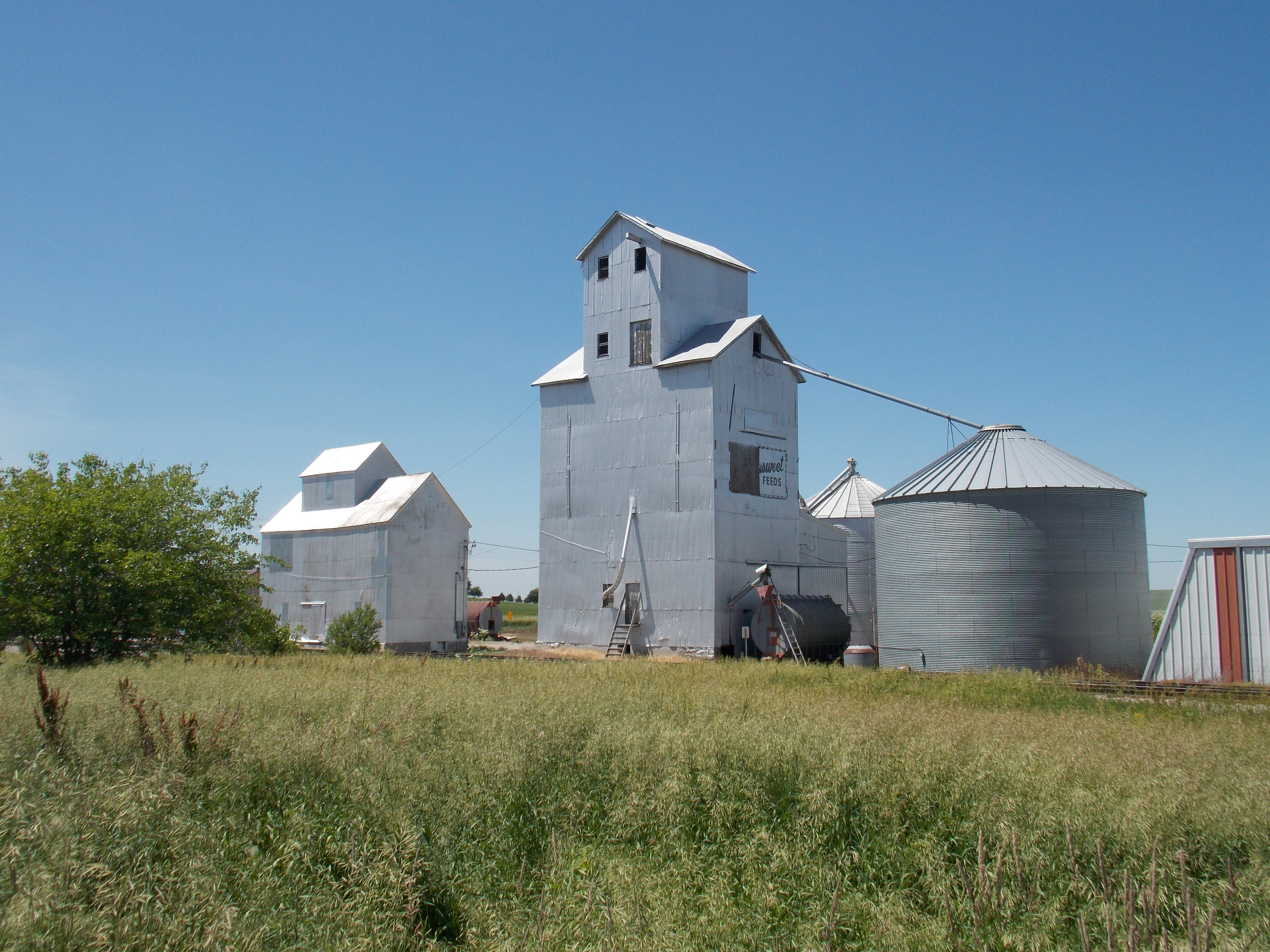
- Grain bins along the Iowa Interstate railroad tracks in Downey

- Location within Iowa
- Coordinates: 41°36′58″N 91°20′55″W
- Country: United States
- State: Iowa
- County: Cedar
- Township: Springdale

Area
  - Total: 0.68 sq mi (1.75 km^{2})
  - Land: 0.68 sq mi (1.75 km^{2})
  - Water: 0 sq mi (0.00 km^{2})
- Elevation: 719 ft (219 m)

Population (2020)
  - Total: 112
  - Density: 165.9/sq mi (64.04/km^{2})
- Time zone: UTC-6 (Central (CST))
  - Summer (DST): UTC-5 (CDT)
- ZIP code: 52358
- Area code: 319
- GNIS feature ID: 2806474

Downey is an unincorporated community and census-designated place (CDP) in Cedar County, Iowa, United States.

== History ==
Downey was established in 1856, the spring after the Chicago, Rock Island and Pacific Railroad was built through it, though the area had first been settled in 1836. Downey is named for its founder, Hugh D. Downey.

Downey's population was 100 in 1902, and 105 in 1925. The population was 111 in 1940.

== Demographics ==
Historical population
Census	Pop.	Note	%±
2020	112		—
U.S. Decennial Census

== Education ==
It is in the West Branch Community School District.
