= Portland, Iowa =

- Census-designated place
- Location within the state of Iowa
- Coordinates: 43°07′27″N 93°07′54″W
- Country: United States
- State: Iowa
- County: Cerro Gordo

Area
  - Total: 1.01 sq mi (2.61 km^{2})
  - Land: 0.99 sq mi (2.57 km^{2})
  - Water: 0.015 sq mi (0.04 km^{2})
- Elevation: 1,076 ft (328 m)

Population (2020)
  - Total: 28
  - Density: 28/sq mi (10.9/km^{2})
- Time zone: UTC-6 (Central (CST))
  - Summer (DST): UTC-5 (CDT)
- ZIP code: 50401
- FIPS code: 19-64155
- GNIS feature ID: 2585483

Portland is an unincorporated community and census-designated place (CDP) in Portland Township, Cerro Gordo County, Iowa, United States. As of the 2020 census it had a population of 28.

== History ==
Portland's population in 1925 was 17. The population was 50 in 1940. The Portland post office operated from 1871 to 1936.

== Geography ==
Portland is located in northern Iowa in eastern Cerro Gordo County, along the northeast bank of the Winnebago River. The Mason City limits are a short distance to the north, with downtown Mason City 6 miles (10 km) to the northwest. U.S. Route 18 is 1 mile (1.6 km) to the south.

== Demographics ==
Historical population
Census	Pop.	Note	%±
2010	35		—
2020	28		−20.0%
U.S. Decennial Census

=== 2020 census ===
As of the census of 2020, there were 28 people, 18 households, and 14 families residing in the community. The population density was 28.2 inhabitants per square mile (10.9/km^{2}). There were 18 housing units at an average density of 18.1 per square mile (7.0/km^{2}). The racial makeup of the community was 92.9% White, 0.0% Black or African American, 0.0% Native American, 3.6% Asian, 0.0% Pacific Islander, 0.0% from other races and 3.6% from two or more races. Hispanic or Latino persons of any race comprised 0.0% of the population.

Of the 18 households, 27.8% of which had children under the age of 18 living with them, 72.2% were married couples living together, 0.0% were cohabitating couples, 22.2% had a female householder with no spouse or partner present and 5.6% had a male householder with no spouse or partner present. 22.2% of all households were non-families. 5.6% of all households were made up of individuals, 5.6% had someone living alone who was 65 years old or older.

The median age in the community was 59.5 years. 3.6% of the residents were under the age of 20; 10.7% were between the ages of 20 and 24; 10.7% were from 25 and 44; 42.9% were from 45 and 64; and 32.1% were 65 years of age or older. The gender makeup of the community was 53.6% male and 46.4% female.

== Education ==
As of the 2020 U.S. census, the CDP is divided between the Mason City Community School District and the Central Springs Community School District.

As of the 2010 U.S. census, the CDP had a much smaller territory, and that area was only in the Nora Springs-Rock Falls Community School District. That district merged into Central Springs on July 1, 2011.
