= Portland Township, Cerro Gordo County, Iowa =

Township in Iowa, US

Portland Township, Cerro Gordo County
- Township
- Coordinates: 43°07′46″N 093°05′02″W
- Country: United States
- State: Iowa
- County: Cerro Gordo

Area
  - Total: 32.42 sq mi (83.96 km^{2})
  - Land: 32.39 sq mi (83.88 km^{2})
  - Water: 0.027 sq mi (0.07 km^{2})
- Elevation: 1,099 ft (335 m)

Population (2000)
  - Total: 331
  - Density: 10/sq mi (3.9/km^{2})
- FIPS code: 19-93456
- GNIS feature ID: 0468560

Portland Township is one of sixteen townships in Cerro Gordo County, Iowa, United States. As of the 2000 census, its population was 331.

== Geography ==
Portland Township covers an area of 32.42 square miles (84.0 km^{2}) and contains a very small part of the city of Nora Springs (which lies mostly in Floyd County to the east). The unincorporated community of Portland, a census-designated place, is located in the western part of the township, just north of the Winnebago River. The county seat, Mason City, borders the township to the northwest.
