= Parker's Woods =

Parker's Woods may refer to:

- Parker's Woods (Mason City, Iowa)
- Parkers Woods and Buttercup Valley Nature Preserve, Cincinnati, Ohio
