= Mason City Schools =

Mason City Schools may refer to the following school districts in the United States:

- Mason City Community School District in Mason City, Iowa
- Mason City Schools (Ohio) in Mason, Ohio
- Mason Independent School District in Mason, Texas
