= Charles Barlow =

Charles Barlow may refer to:

- Charles A. Barlow (1858–1927), U.S. representative from California
- Charles F. Barlow (1923–2010), American pediatric neurologist
- Charles Barlow (businessman) (1905–1979), South African entrepreneur and Somerset cricketer
