= Parker's Woods (Mason City, Iowa) =

- Parker's Woods Park Historic District
- U.S. National Register of Historic Places
- U.S. Historic district
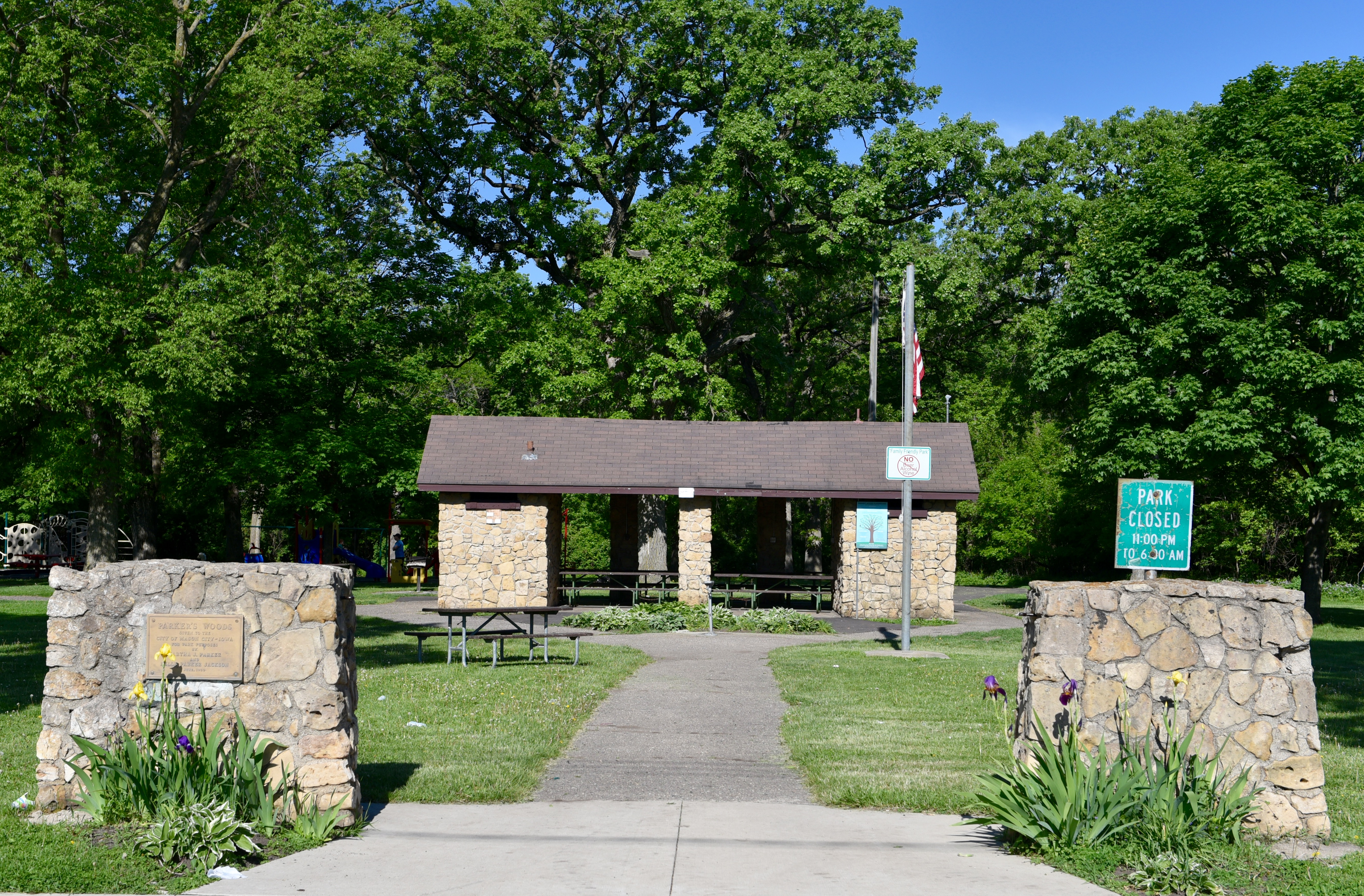
- The picnic shelter and entrance bollards (1941)

- Location within Iowa Location within the United States
- Location: N. Jackson Ave. between 1st & 4th Sts., NW., Mason City, Iowa
- Coordinates: 43°09′15″N 93°12′45″W
- Area: 13 acres (5.3 ha)
- Architect: Floyd W. Sapp
- NRHP reference No.: 14000856
- Added to NRHP: October 15, 2014

Parker's Woods is a recreational park located in Mason City, Iowa, United States. It was listed as a historic district on the National Register of Historic Places in 2014. At the time of its nomination it contained three resources, which included one contributing building, one contributing site, and one structure. It contains 13 acres (5.3 ha) of land along Willow Creek. The park features picnic areas, three tennis courts, volleyball court, basketball courts, playgrounds, and fishing in Willow Creek.

== History ==
Prior to being a park, this land had been a part of A.T. Parker's farm since 1874. It was utilized as pasture land and because of its proximity to the Union Pacific railroad tracks, Parker allowed it to be used as a circus grounds. His widow and a daughter, Martha J. Parker and Belle Parker Jackson, donated the land to Mason City for a park in 1939. It has been used for that purpose ever since. The park was developed from 1939 to 1941 by the National Youth Administration (NYA), a Depression-era relief program that provided part-time work and job training to young men and women. It is a rare example of a park that was developed in its entirety by the NYA in Iowa. The plan for the park's development was created by Cedar Rapids landscape architect Floyd W. Sapp. Development was limited as the Parker's wanted the park to be kept in a natural state.

The NYA began by clearing brush and poison ivy from the park. They also built the rustic picnic shelter and entrance bollards, which were completed in 1941. At the same time, the NYA was also involved with projects in East Park. The Parker's Woods project provided employment for 40 young men. Other improvements in the park such as playgrounds and athletic fields and courts were added by the city after World War II.
