= East Park Band Shell =

- U.S. National Register of Historic Places
- U.S. Historic district – Contributing property
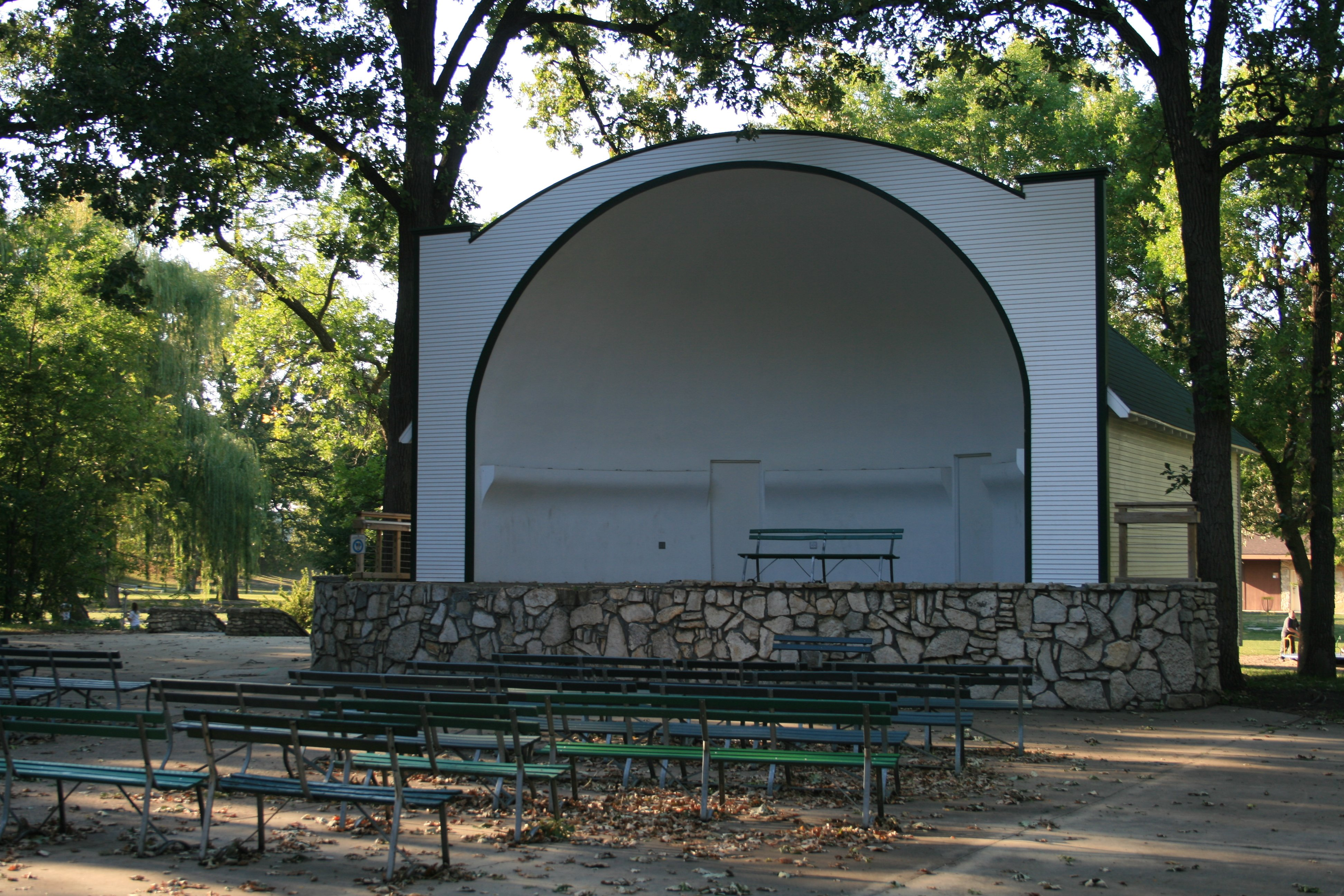

- Location within Iowa Location within the United States
- Location: E. State St. between N. Carolina Ave. and N. Kentucky Ave., Mason City, Iowa
- Coordinates: 43°09′14.1″N 93°11′1.4″W
- Area: 1.6 acres (0.65 ha)
- Built: 1924
- Built by: J.H. Timmerman & Son
- Architect: Lester Lewis
- Part of: East Park Historic District (ID14000855)
- NRHP reference No.: 09000825
- Added to NRHP: October 14, 2009

The East Park Band Shell is a historic structure located in Mason City, Iowa, United States. The band shell was individually listed on the National Register of Historic Places in 2009. In 2014 it was included as a contributing property in the East Park Historic District.

== History ==
The city acquired the first 40 acres (16 ha) for East Park in 1909. F.E. Pease designed the park with its two entrances off of State Street, the curving drives, a small pond, tennis courts, and a music pavilion. The park has subsequently grown to include 57 acres (23 ha), and the city has added other amenities. In 1920 the Mason City Chamber of Commerce organized a municipal band made up of professional musicians from around the country to give a series of summer concerts. James M. Fulton from Boston was the conductor, and Mason City native Meredith Willson played the flute and piccolo.

The band utilized a portable bandstand for their concerts until this one was dedicated on July 24, 1924. It was designed by a local draftsman named Lester Lewis. Its dedication in 1924 makes this structure, along with the W.D. Petersen Memorial Music Pavilion in Davenport (1924), the two oldest band shells in Iowa. It was also among the first structures built in East Park. Concerts and other civic activities have been held here ever since. During the period of time that Carleton Stewart was the conductor (1937-1963) several changes were made to the band shell. An addition was built onto the rear, the front of the stage was extended to create an apron, the vertical board and batten siding was added to the facade, and a stone veneer was applied to the front of the apron. It is not known the exact year that these additions were made.

Wilson was no longer in the municipal band when the band shell was dedicated. He is known to have been in it twice. The first time was on August 22, 1939, when he conducted the Municipal Band, during which they played his composition for the United States Army Air Corps, Wings on High. The second occasion was in June 1962 when U.S. Secretary of the Treasury C. Douglas Dillon presented him with the President's Gold Medallion for his promotion of the Bonds for Freedom.
