= MacNider Art Museum =

Coordinates: 43.149297°N 93.195669°W

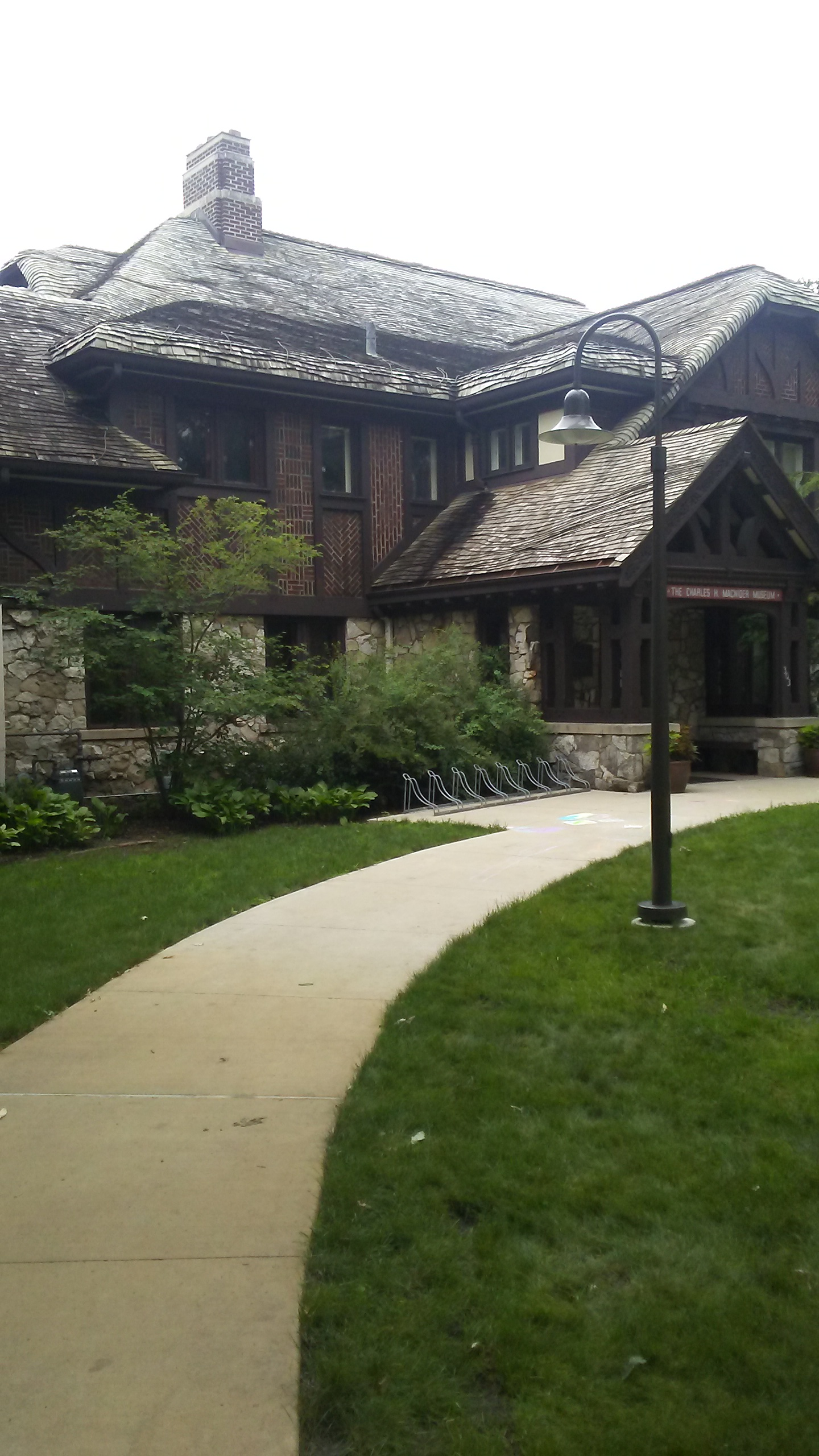
- Charles H. MacNider Art Museum in June 2018
- Established: 1966
- Location: 303 Second Street SE; Mason City, Iowa, USA
- Type: Art museum
- Public transit access: Red
- Website: www.macniderart.org

MacNider Art Museum, officially the Charles H. MacNider Art Museum, is an art museum conceived in 1964 and opened to the public in 1966 in Mason City, Iowa. It is housed in a former convent. The museum is known for its collection of American art, and includes paintings, prints, drawings, ceramics, sculpture, fused and blown glass and textiles. There is a special collection of Bil Baird marionettes, hand puppets and ephemera, including those used for "The Lonely Goatherd" scene in the film The Sound of Music.

It is named after Charles H. MacNider (b. 1860), president of the First National Bank of Mason City and father of General Hanford MacNider.
