= Mier Wolf House =

Historic house in Iowa, United States

- U.S. National Register of Historic Places
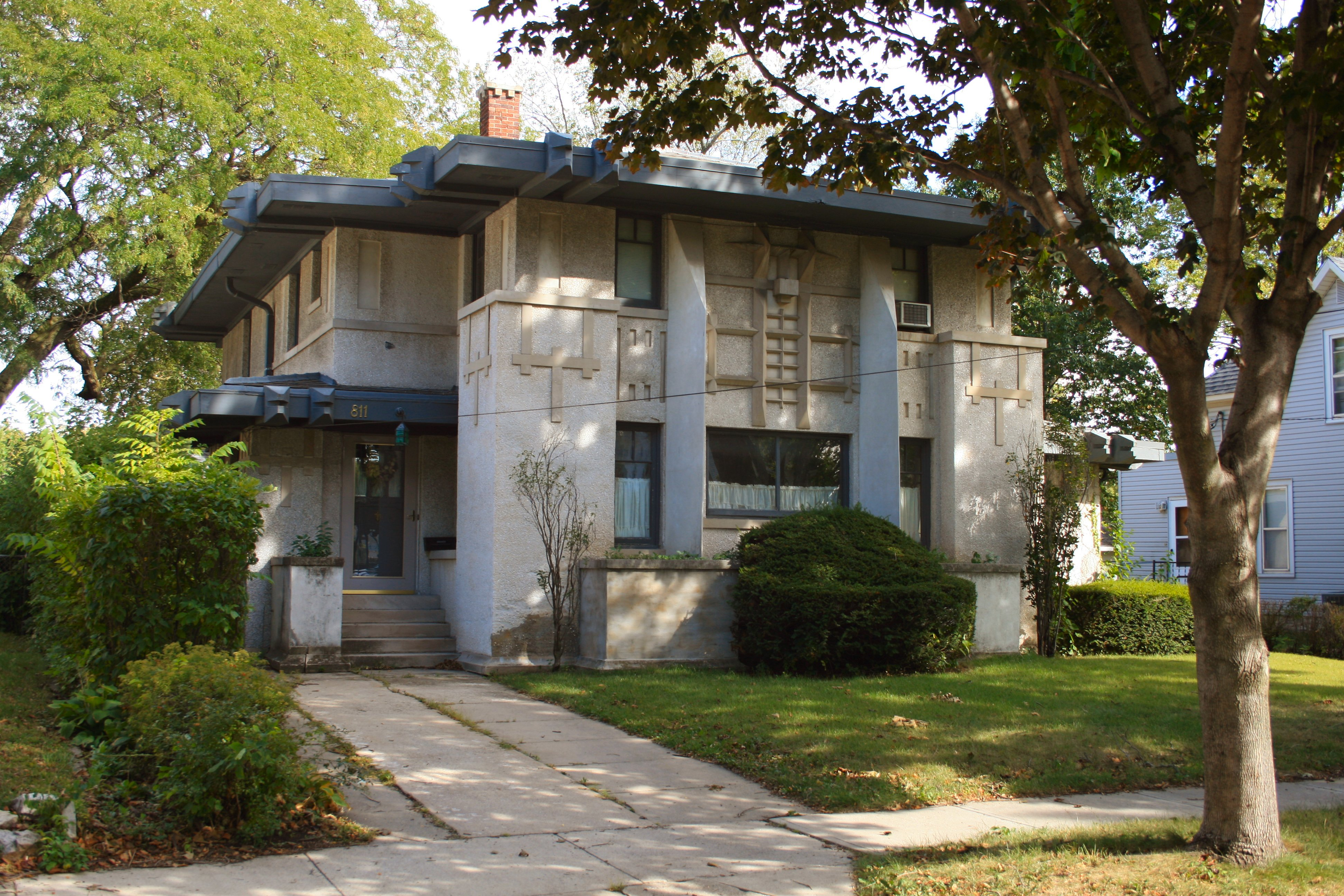

- Location within Iowa Location within the United States
- Location: 811 N. Adams St. Mason City, Iowa
- Coordinates: 43°09′34.1″N 93°12′14.3″W
- Area: less than one acre
- Built: 1909
- Architectural style: Prairie School
- MPS: Prairie School Architecture in Mason City TR
- NRHP reference No.: 80001442
- Added to NRHP: January 29, 1980

The Mier Wolf House is a historic building located in Mason City, Iowa, United States. Wolf was a prominent member of the local business community, operating a furniture store. Completed in 1909, this house is an early example of Prairie School architecture in Mason City. While its architect is unknown, it exhibits similarities to Frank Lloyd Wright's Mayan Period. The house features geometric wall decorations, truncated, stylized piers, and paired sculpted shapes on the heavy fascia of the broad overhanging hip roof. It was listed on the National Register of Historic Places in 1980.
