= Rock Crest–Rock Glen Historic District =

Historic district in Iowa, United States

- U.S. National Register of Historic Places
- U.S. Historic district
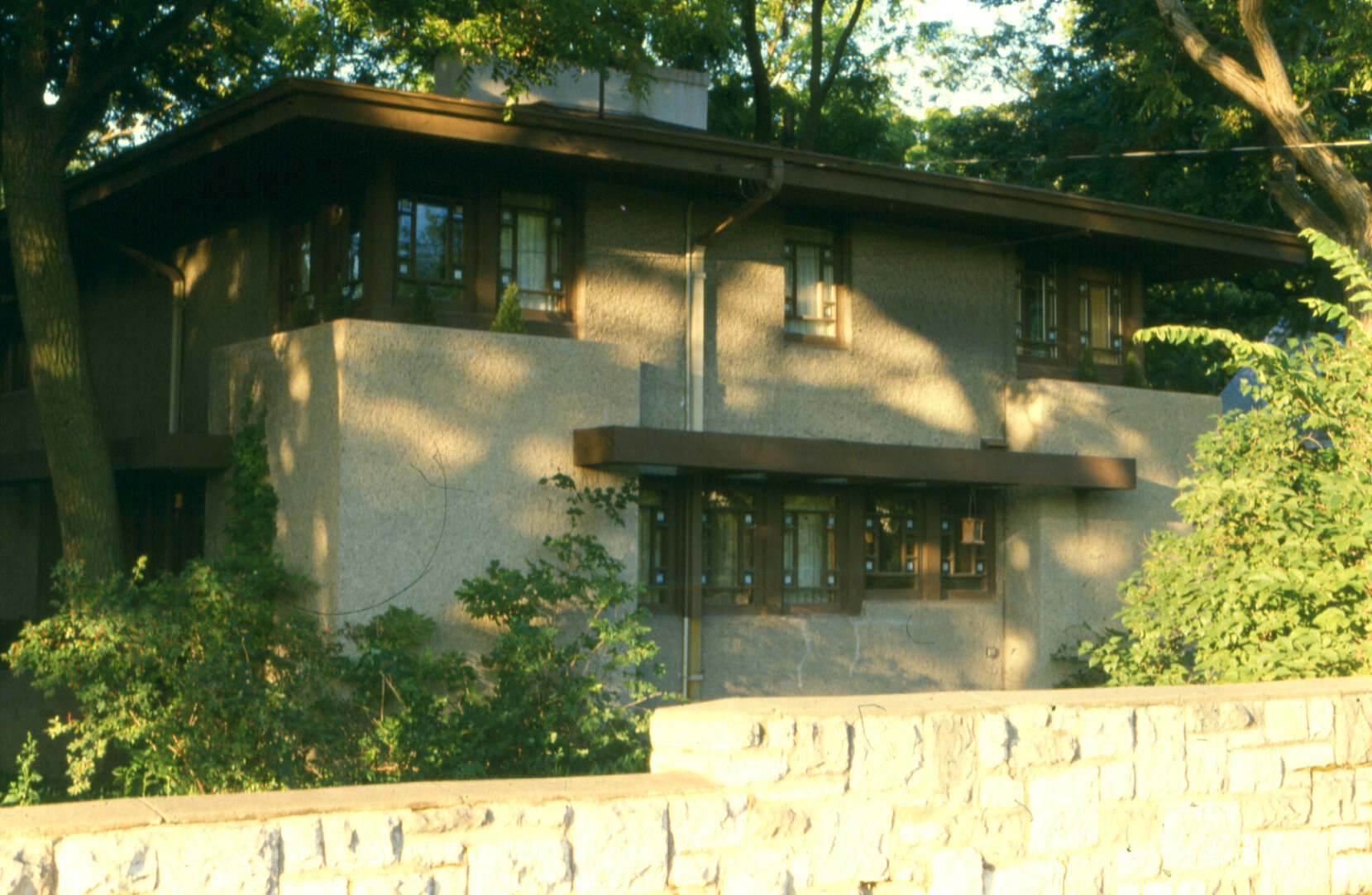
- Arthur L. Rule House (1914)

- Location within Iowa Location within the United States
- Location: Off US 18 in Mason City, Iowa
- Coordinates: 43°09′02″N 93°11′32″W
- Area: 12 acres (4.9 ha)
- Architect: Multiple
- Architectural style: Prairie School
- NRHP reference No.: 79000885
- Added to NRHP: December 28, 1979

The Rock Crest–Rock Glen Historic District is a nationally recognized historic district located in Mason City, Iowa, United States. It was listed on the National Register of Historic Places in 1979. At the time of its nomination it contained 10 resources, which included eight contributing buildings, one contributing site, and one non-contributing building. All of the buildings are houses designed in the Prairie School style, and are a part of a planned development. Joshua Melson, a local developer, bought the property along Willow Creek between 1902 and 1908. Initially, there were only going to be 10 houses built, but the number grew to 16. While only half the houses planned were actually constructed, it is still the largest cluster of Prairie School houses in the country. The one non-contributing house is the 1959 McNider House, a Modern movement structure that was built where one of the planned houses was to be built, but never was. The architects who contributed to the district include Walter Burley Griffin, who provided the initial plan for the development; Barry Byrne, who took over from Griffin; Marion Mahony Griffin, Walter Griffin's wife and an architect in her own right; and Einar Broaten. Frank Lloyd Wright had a design that was never built here. The plans were used to build the Isabel Roberts House in River Forest, Illinois instead.

The mill was built in 1870, and it was the second mill built in Mason City. When the Rock Crest–Rock Glen plans were finalized, the mill was dismantled and the stone foundations maintained to house a hydroelectric station for the development. The station was never built. Other plans included having them used as a pier support for a bridge across Willow Creek, and for a small summer house. Those plans also were never executed.
