= East Park (Mason City, Iowa) =

- East Park Historic District
- U.S. National Register of Historic Places
- U.S. Historic district
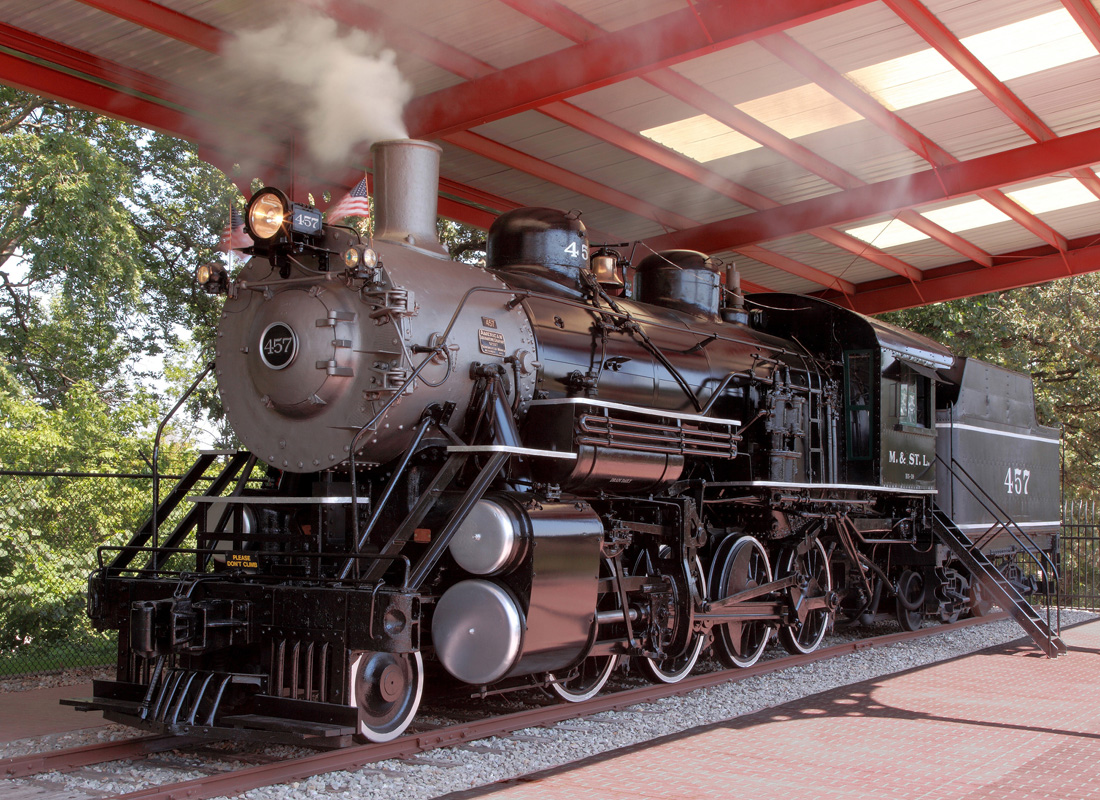
- Minneapolis and St. Louis Railroad steam engine (1912)

- Location within Iowa Location within the United States
- Location: Roughly bounded by the Winnebago R., N. Carolina, N. Kentucky & N. Virginia Aves., CPRR tracks, E. State St., Mason City, Iowa
- Coordinates: 43°09′15″N 93°11′0″W
- Area: 57.6 acres (23.3 ha)
- Architect: Frank E. Pease
- NRHP reference No.: 14000855
- Added to NRHP: October 15, 2014

East Park is a recreational park located in Mason City, Iowa, United States. It was listed as a historic district on the National Register of Historic Places in 2014. At the time of its nomination it contained 21 resources, which included three contributing buildings, one contributing site, five structures, seven non-contributing buildings, and five non-contributing structures. It contains 57.6 acres (23.3 ha) of land along the Winnebago River. The park features picnic areas, a 9-hole disc golf course, three tennis courts, volleyball court, basketball courts, fishing, a sledding hill, playgrounds including the Prairie Playground, a 2.08-mile (3.35 km) hard surface trail system, a band shell and a gazebo.

== History ==
East Park was established in 1909 as the second recreational park in Mason City. Its original 40 acres (16 ha) were designed by Des Moines landscape architect Frank E. Pease. He laid out the park's curvilinear street system (contributing structure), which emphasizes its landscape of flat prairie and rolling hills. Pease is also responsible for designing the park's water system (contributing structure), which includes Willow Creek and a duck pond created in a marshy area on the east side of the park. In 1937 the Works Progress Administration (WPA) added concrete edges to Willow Creek and concrete spillways to control and contain the water during floods. The size of the park expanded over the years until it reached its current 57.6 acres in 1957.

The East Park Band Shell (1924), which is individually listed on the National Register, is located near the center of the park. Other park amenities that contribute to the historic nature of the park include the two picnic shelters, Shelter #1 (WPA; 1937) and Shelter #4 (1965), tennis courts (WPA; 1937), a stone footbridge (WPA; c. 1937), and the Parks Department maintenance building (1956). The tennis courts were part of Pease's original plan but were not added until later. There is also a Minneapolis and St. Louis Railway steam engine (1912) that was placed in the park near the railroad tracks in 1957. The non-contributing resources are park amenities that were built, or significantly altered, between 1970 and about 2000.
