= Charles F. Barlow =

American professor

Charles F. Barlow M.D.
- Charles F. Barlow
- Born: November 10, 1923; Mason City, Iowa, U.S.
- Died: December 11, 2010 (aged 87); Cohasset, Massachusetts, US
- Education: Johns Hopkins Hospital
- Occupation: Doctor of Medicine
- Years active: 1950-
- Known for: Blood–brain barrier research

Charles Franklin Barlow (November 10, 1923 – December 11, 2010) was an American pediatric neurologist. He was the Bronson Crothers Professor of Neurology at Harvard Medical School and Chair of Neurology at Boston Children's Hospital.

== Early life ==
Barlow was born in 1923 in Mason City, Iowa, to parents Franklin Barlow and Marie née McCabe. He grew up near Clear Lake, where his father worked in the amusement business. In 1943 he graduated from Clear Lake High School. He attended Coe College for two years before transferring to Williams College and then the University of Chicago. He earned a B.S. in 1945 and an M.D. in 1947. He helped to finance his education with money earned from his magician act The Great Barloni.

== Career ==
Barlow completed an internship in pediatrics at Johns Hopkins Hospital followed by a year at Boston Children's Hospital. He then joined the U.S. Navy during the Korean War and served as a medical officer at Naval Hospital Boston and Naval Hospital Camp Pendleton. In 1951 he returned to Chicago and began training in neurology. In 1954 he joined the University of Chicago faculty, and his research focussed mainly on the blood–brain barrier.

In 1963, Barlow was appointed the Bronson Crothers Professor of Neurology at Harvard Medical School and Chair of Neurology at Boston Children's Hospital; he was 39 years old at the time. Whereas Bronson Crothers, the namesake of his position, had a strong training in pediatrics, Barlow had trained more rigorously in neurology. During his time at Harvard, he started the Harvard-Longwood neurology training program, which at the time was the only program in the U.S. that included both adult and pediatric neurology. He established a Mental Retardation Research Center, funded by the National Institutes of Health, and directed the center for two decades. He authored two medical textbooks: Mental Retardation and Related Disorders (1978) and Headaches and Migraines in Children (1984).

== Death ==
Barlow died on December 11, 2010, in Cohasset, Massachusetts, from complications related to a stroke.
