= Mason City Community School District =

Public school district in Mason City, Iowa, United States

Coordinates: 43.136665°N 93.198038°W

Location
- Mason City, Iowa Cerro Gordo County United States
- Coordinates: 43.136665, -93.198038

District information
- Type: Local school district
- Grades: K-12
- Established: 1890
- Superintendent: Pat Hamilton
- Schools: 8
- Budget: $64,187,000 (2020-21)
- NCES District ID: 1918780

Students and staff
- Students: 3598 (2022-23)
- Teachers: 256.51 FTE
- Staff: 307.37 FTE
- Student–teacher ratio: 14.03
- Athletic conference: Iowa Alliance Conference
- District mascot: Riverhawks
- Colors: Red and Black

Other information
- Website: www.masoncityschools.org

Mason City Community School District (also known as Mason City Schools) is a public school district headquartered in Mason City, Iowa. It is entirely in Cerro Gordo County and serves the city and surrounding rural areas.

It covers a portion of the Portland census-designated place (as of the 2020 U.S. census).

== History ==
In December 2018, the Iowa State Auditors office found improper distribution of funds, during an eight-year period, concerning $2.2 million. Superintendent Anita Micich did not get the permission from the school board to approve the payments. The office of the Cerro Gordo County Attorney chose not to file criminal charges.

== Athletics ==
The school district applied to join the Northeast Iowa Conference but all of the existing conference members voted to not allow the district to join.

== Schools ==
High schools

- Mason City High School
- Alternative High School

Middle schools

- John Adams Middle School
- Roosevelt Middle School ( closed 2011)

Intermediate schools

- Lincoln Intermediate School

Elementary schools

- Harding Elementary School
- Hoover Elementary School
- Jefferson Elementary School
- Roosevelt Elementary School

Other:

- Pinecrest Center

== See also ==
- List of school districts in Iowa
