= Mason City, Iowa =

City in Iowa, United States

- City
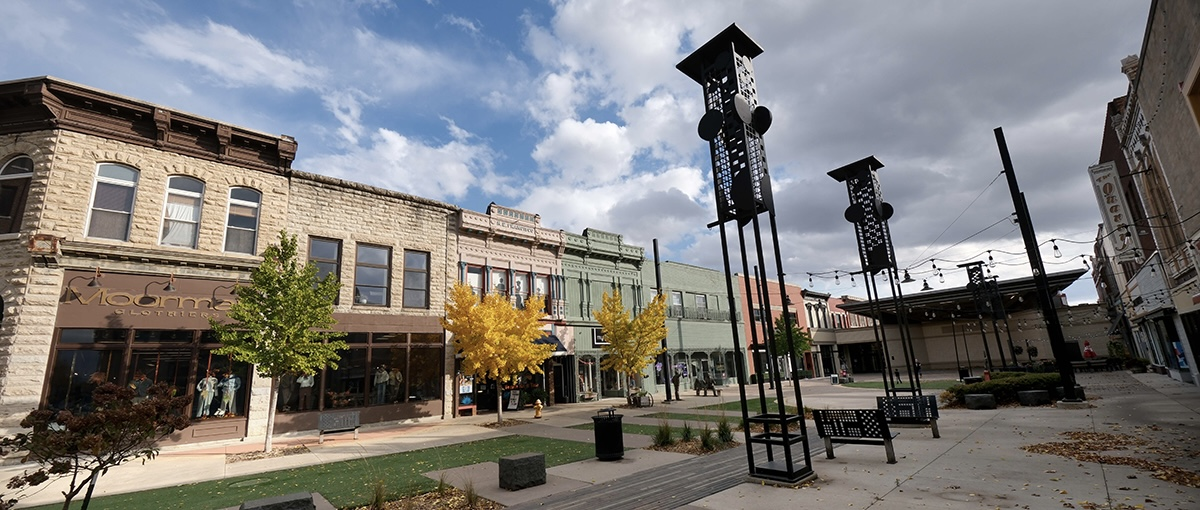
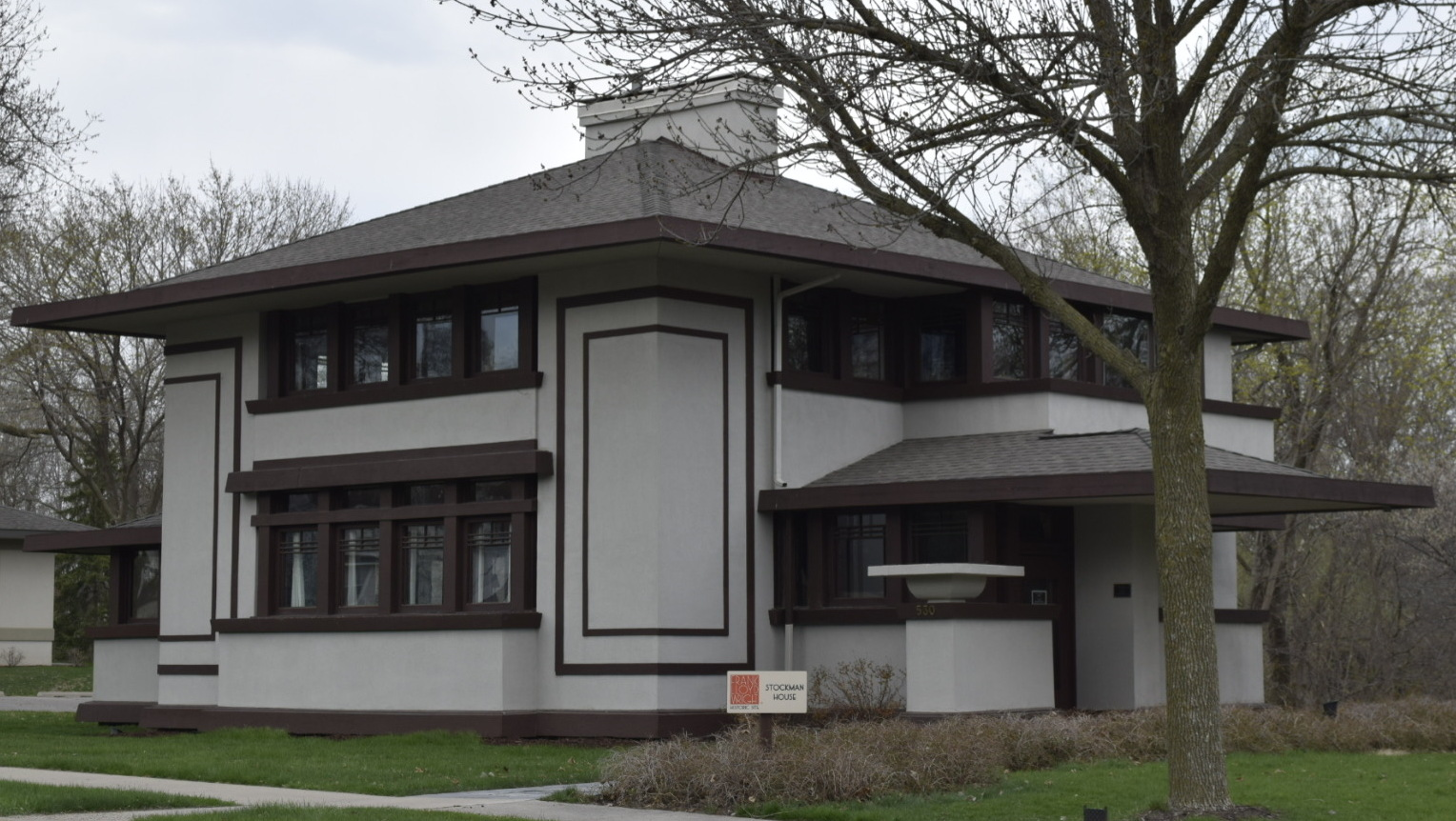
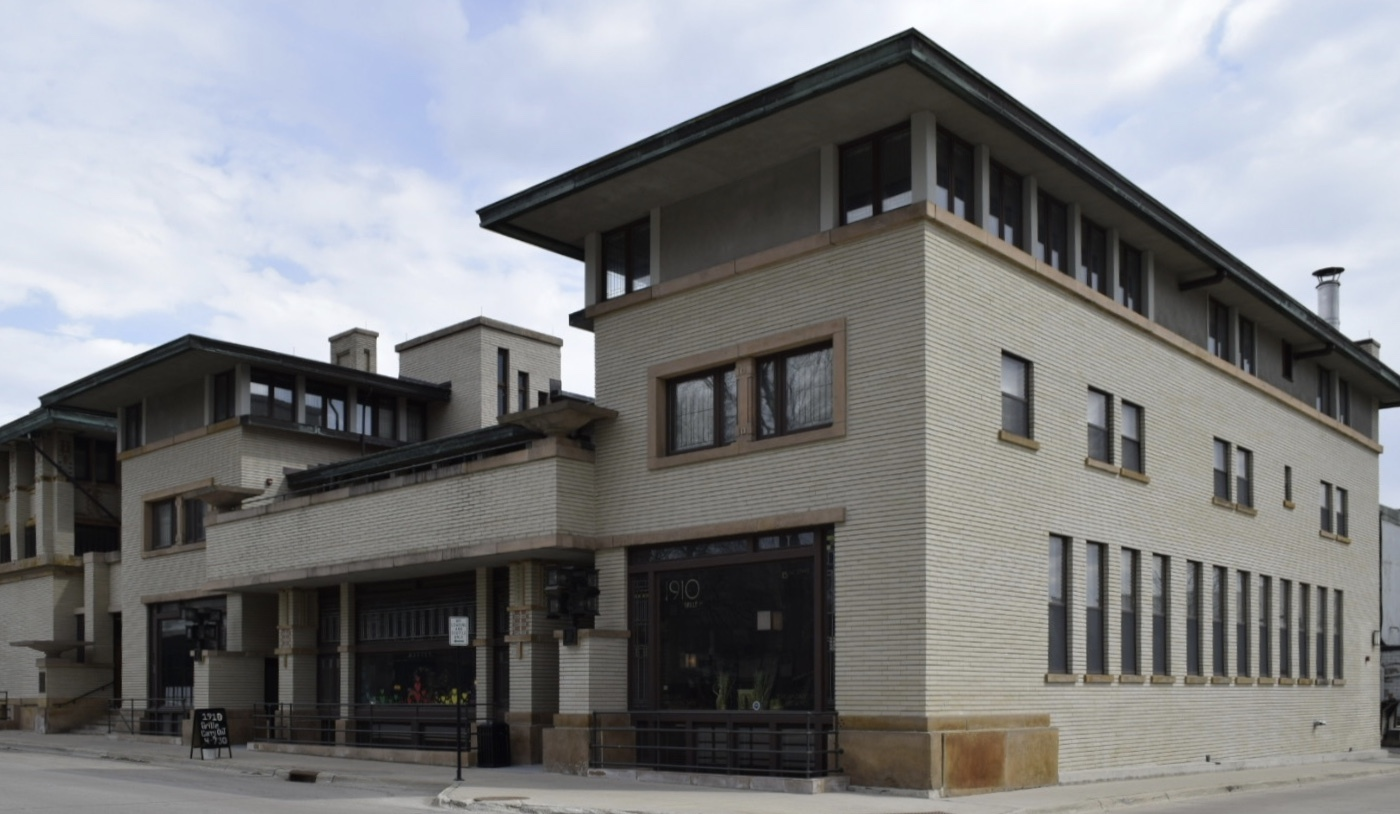
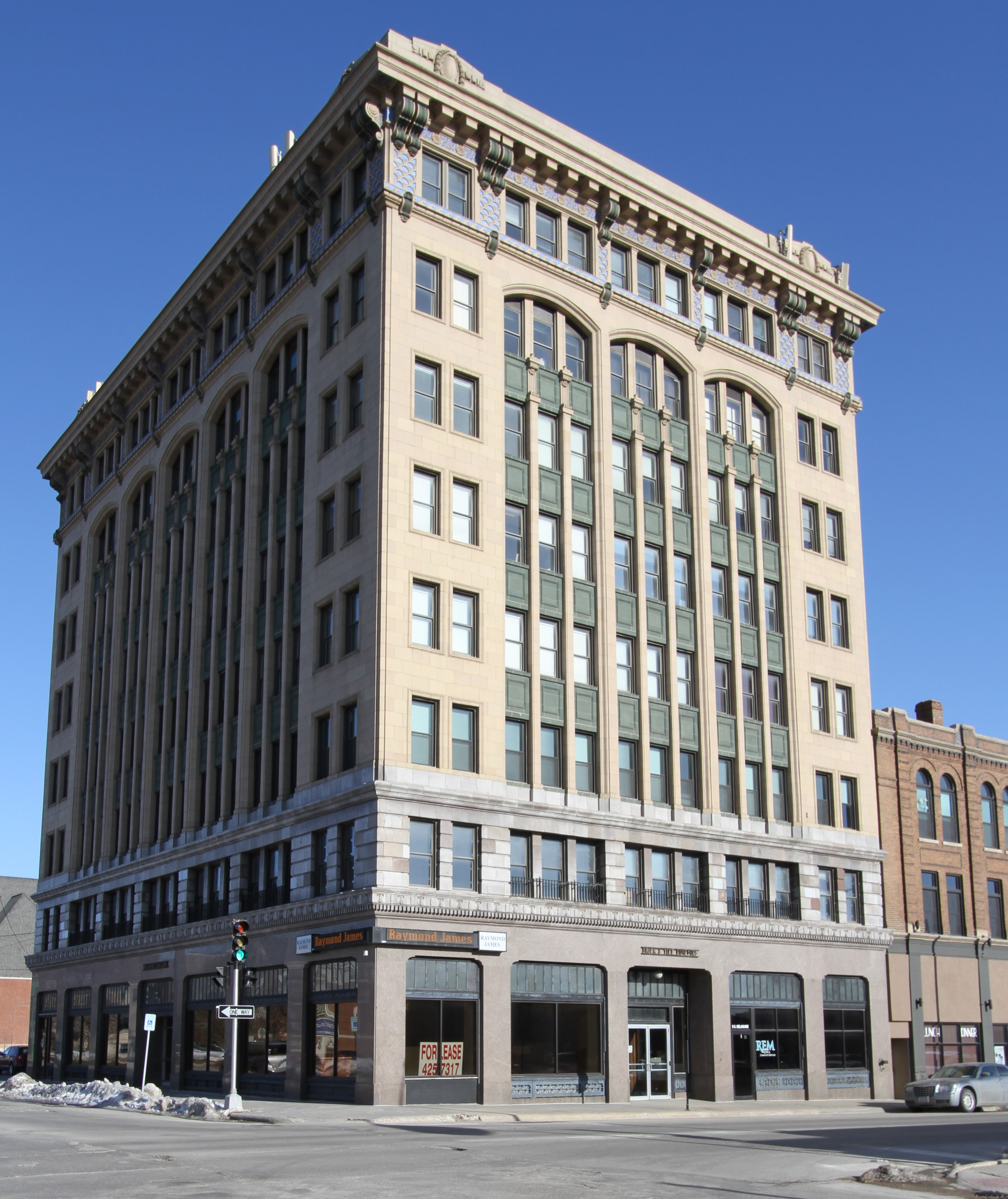
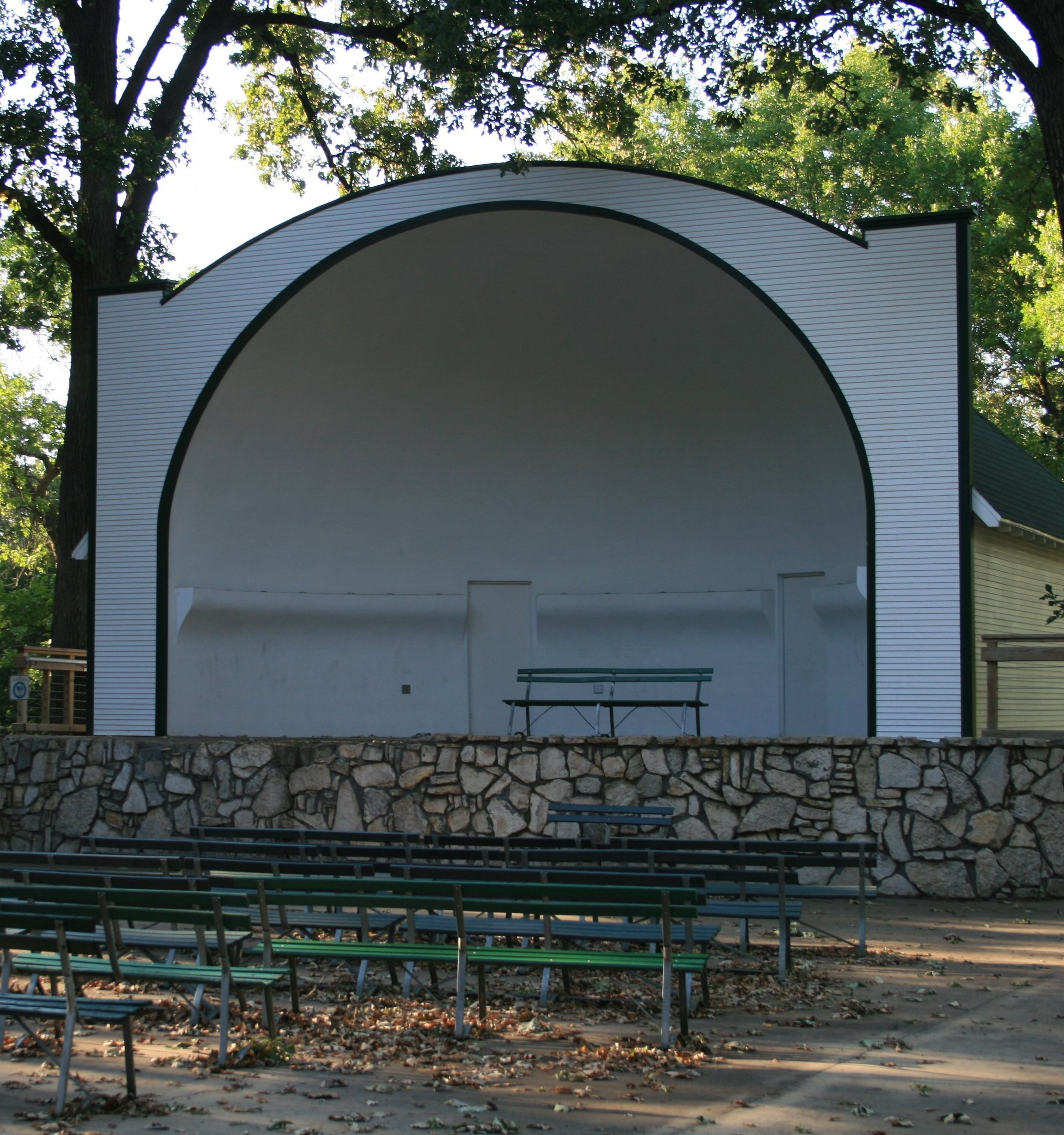
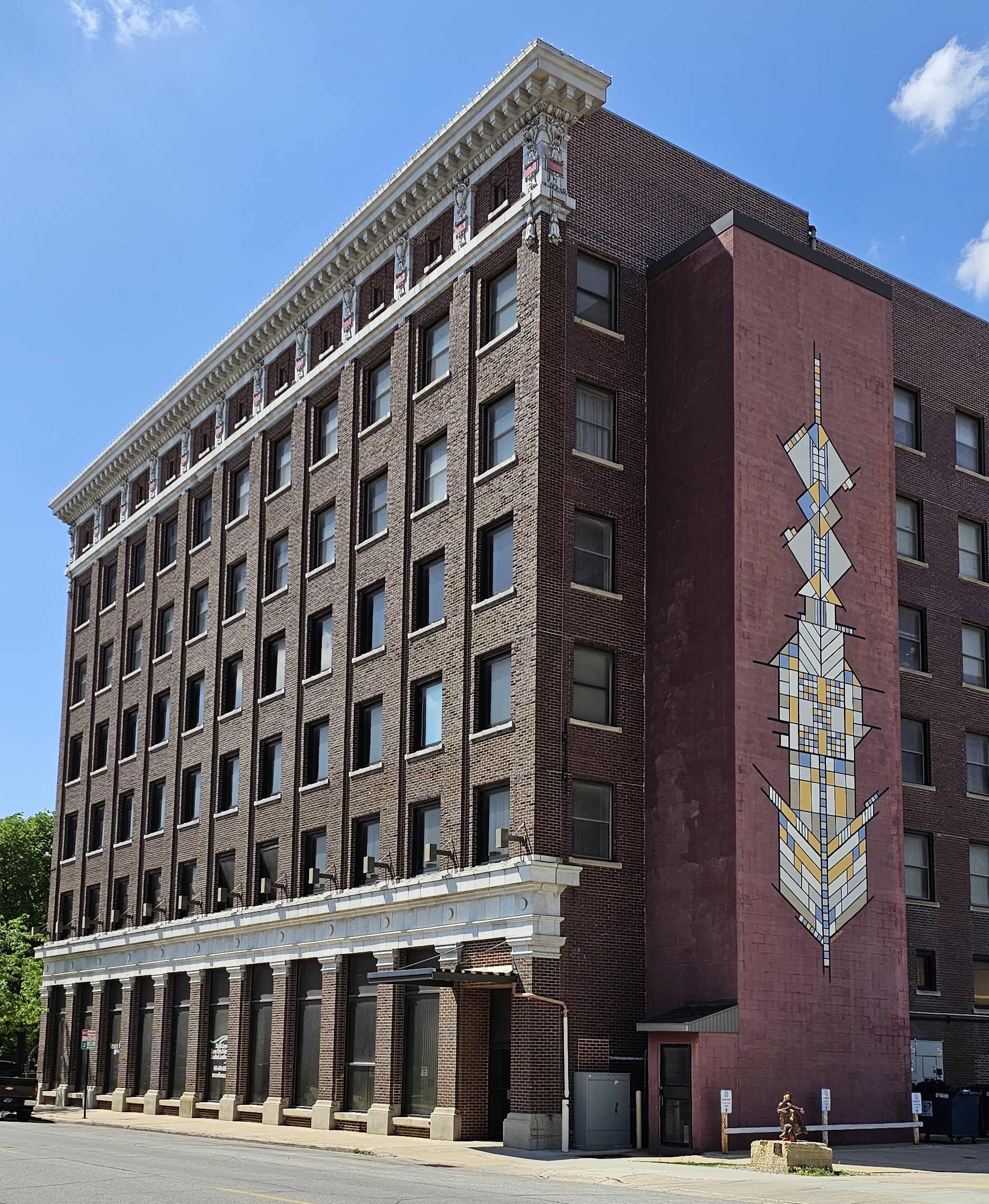
- Downtown Mason City Stockman House Park Inn Hotel Brick and Tile Building East Park Band Shell City Center Building

- Flag Logo
- Nickname: "River City"
- Location of Mason City, Iowa
- Coordinates: 43°08′55″N 93°12′07″W
- Country: United States
- State: Iowa
- County: Cerro Gordo

Government
  - Type: Mayor-council government
  - Mayor: John Lee

Area
  - Total: 28.15 sq mi (72.92 km^{2})
  - Land: 27.86 sq mi (72.15 km^{2})
  - Water: 0.30 sq mi (0.78 km^{2})
- Elevation: 1,125 ft (343 m)

Population (2020)
  - Total: 27,338
  - Rank: 16th in Iowa
  - Density: 981.4/sq mi (378.93/km^{2})
- Time zone: UTC−6 (Central (CST))
  - Summer (DST): UTC−5 (CDT)
- ZIP Codes: 50401, 50402, 50467
- Area code: 641
- FIPS code: 19-50160
- GNIS feature ID: 468366
- Website: www.masoncity.net

Mason City is a city in and the county seat of Cerro Gordo County, Iowa, United States. The population was 27,338 in the 2020 census. Mason City, known for its heritage in musical theatre, inspired the town of “River City” in The Music Man. It is also home to a significant collection of Prairie School style architecture. Along with nearby Clear Lake, the city forms a regional commercial, industrial, and cultural hub for north-central Iowa.

The Mason City Micropolitan Statistical Area which includes all of Cerro Gordo and Worth counties is located at the transportation junction between Interstate 35 and the Avenue of the Saints. Des Moines is 120 miles to the south, and the Twin Cities of Minneapolis-Saint Paul are 135 miles to the north, making the local area approximately halfway between the two metropolitan areas. Public education is provided by North Iowa Area Community College and Mason City Community School District. The Winnebago River traverses the community to the southeast.

Points of interest include the Charles H. MacNider Art Museum, historic East Park, the Prairie Rock Trails Bike Park, and the Meredith Willson boyhood home and Music Man Square pavilion. The most significant Prairie School structures are the Frank Lloyd Wright designed Stockman House, home of the Architectural Interpretive Center and the Park Inn Hotel-City National Bank, Wright’s last remaining intact hotel. Rock Crest-Rock Glen, the world’s largest unified neighborhood made up of Prairie School homes is also in the city.

== History ==
The land on which Mason City now stands was previously a grove of trees surrounded by the expansive and gently rolling tallgrass prairie of north-central Iowa. This wooded area was near the limestone outcroppings that line the confluence of Lime Creek (now known as the Winnebago River) and Willow Creek. In the years immediately before the east-to-west expansion of the United States, this land was inhabited by the Ioway, Winnebago, Meskwaki (Fox), Sauk, and Dakota Native American tribes. The first White settlers arrived in the area in 1853; they were John Long, Joseph Hewitt, and George Brentner, who hailed from La Salle, Illinois. Long was a member of a Free Masonic Order, and they initially named the dense wood stand as Masonic Grove. The next year, in 1854, more settlers involved in Free Masonic groups arrived, and platted a town, first known as Shibboleth and later Masonville. Coincidentally, the name Masonville was proposed by John Long to honor his son, Mason, who died en route to then Shibboleth. In 1854, John McMillin opened the first store, and Dr. Silas Card opened the first medical practice in the area. Ultimately, in 1855 the name was changed to Mason City to differentiate from Masonville, Delaware County, Iowa.

Until 1855, Mason City was without local county government, and Cerro Gordo County (named for the Battle of Cerro Gordo, Mexican–American War) was attached to the Floyd County government and commission. In August 1855, Cerro Gordo County citizens voted to organize their county government, and three commissioners were appointed to choose a county-seat. The commission chose Mason City as its preferred county seat. In December 1856, the Iowa General Assembly voted to relocate the seat of government closer to Clear Lake, then known as Livonia. In April 1858, county citizens countered that change and voted against relocating the seat from Mason City, where it has remained ever since.

=== Early growth (1850–1900) ===
The United States Post Office Department started service to the town in 1857. In 1870, Mason City, Iowa was officially incorporated as a town with Darius B. Mason as the first mayor. Historically, the largest industry in the city was brick and tile manufacturing, limestone quarrying, and cement production. The land near Mason City is rich in clay and limestone deposits that allowed the growth of a large masonry-based industry. Much of the success of the Mason City Brick and Tile industry was achieved under the leadership of O.T. Denison, who was a proprietor in three of the many brick yards, including the largest, the Mason City Brick and Tile Works. Under his direction, the company came to own most of the brick works in town, the North Iowa Brick and Tile Works being an exception. Until about 1934, Iowa used more drain tile than any other area of equal size in the world, and Mason City was the center of this manufacturing.

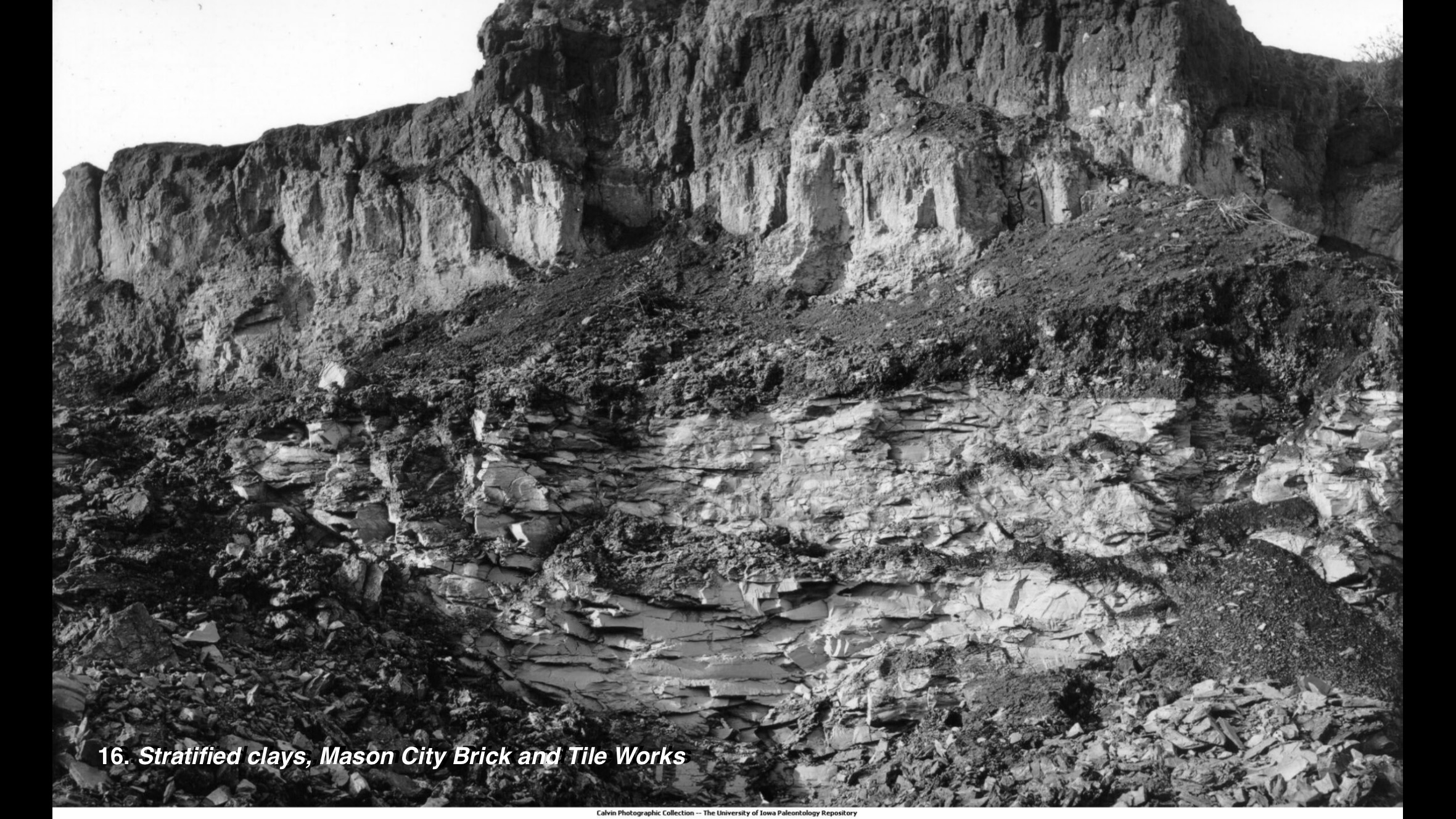
Stratified clays in clay pit located in Mason City, IA. Circa 1895.

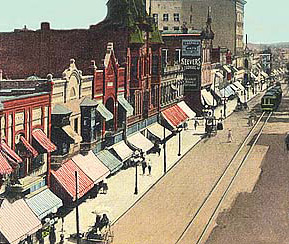
Downtown Mason City, IA. Circa 1883.

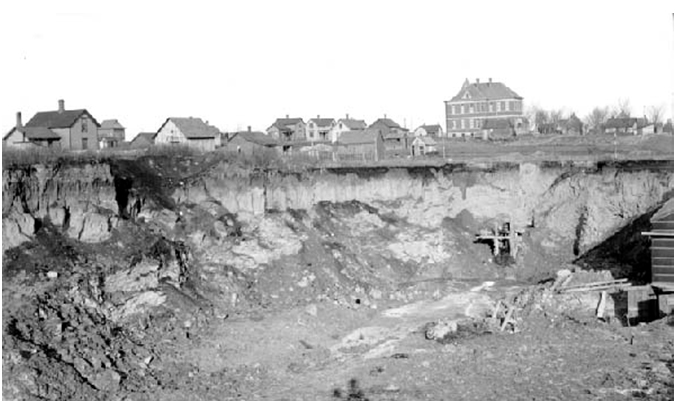
Clay pit of the Mason City Brick-and-Tile Co. Circa 1890.

The city was first connected to the railroad in 1869 by the Dakota Branch of the St. Paul and Milwaukee Railroad. It was later connected to the rest of the state with a line built by the St. Louis and St. Paul Railroad, which shipped lots of coal mined in southern Iowa to the northern side of the state to fuel emerging heavy industries, such as brick and tile in the vicinity. In 1896, the Mason City and Clear Lake Railway was originally founded as a rail transit between the cities. Since 1937, the railway has operated only as a freight route and is currently known as the Iowa Traction Railway. The Iowa Traction Railway is known as the last electric shortline interurban railway in the nation. By 1903, Mason City had a population of 12,000 and streecar service had been extended to Clear Lake, which allowed the nearby resort town to become easily accessible to Mason City residents.

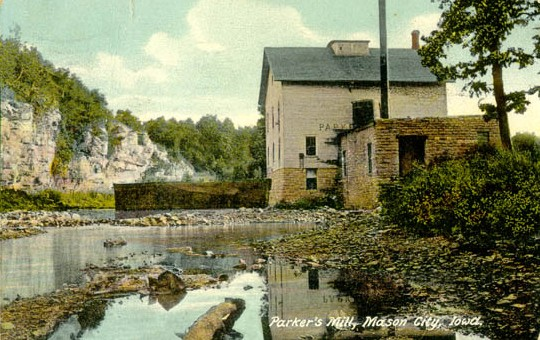
The former Parker's Mill along Willow Creek. Built in 1870 by H.G. Parker. Now the site of the Rock Glen-Rock Crest housing development.

=== Era of sustained growth (1900–1970) ===
At the turn of the 20th century, in 1907, renowned architect Frank Lloyd Wright visited Mason City to complete design work for a prominent businessman. Mason City was fortunate to have Wright and several of his associates, including Walter Burley Griffin, Marion Mahony Griffin, and Barry Byrne, leave behind several notable examples of their distinctive prairie school architectural style. Burley Griffin and Mahony Griffin later gained fame for designing the plans for the new capital city of Australia, Canberra. Among Wright's contributions to the community are the first Prairie School-designed home in Iowa, the Frank Lloyd Wright Stockman House constructed in 1908; the Park Inn Hotel, the sole surviving hotel designed by Wright, built in 1910; and the City National Bank building, completed concurrently with the hotel. The Rock Crest-Rock Glen area witnessed the development of the largest collection of Prairie School-style designed homes on a unified site. The First National Bank was robbed by John Dillinger and his gang on March 13, 1934. They escaped with $52,000 despite the fact the bank actually had more than $300,000 on hand that day.

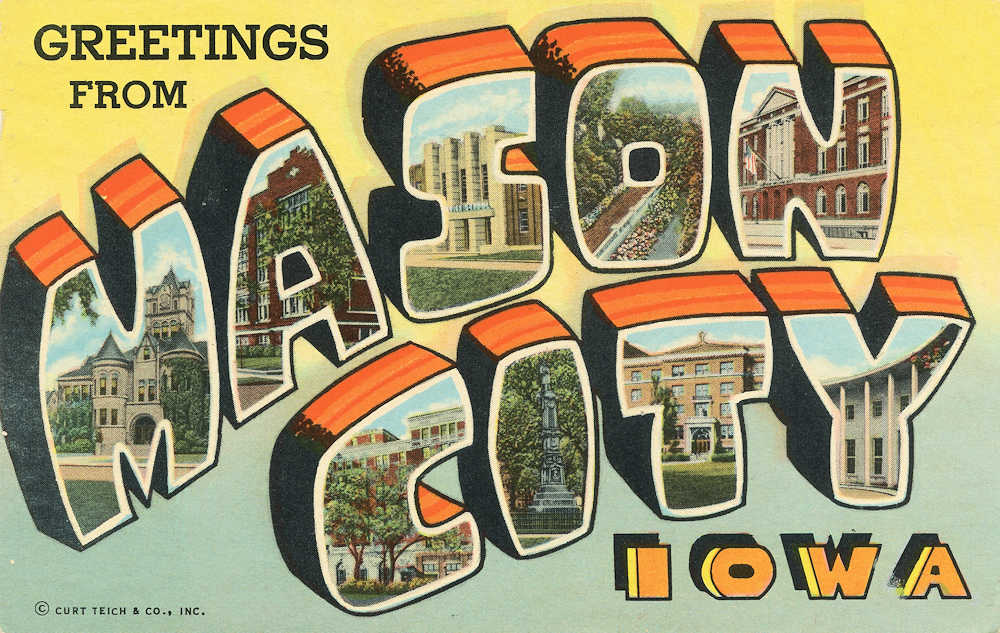
Mason City Postcard, 1950.

In 1954 a new breed of horse was introduced in Mason City. The Pony of the Americas was first bred in Mason City by resident Les Boomhower. He intended the pony to be medium-sized, calm, and safe for children to learn on. It was first developed as a cross between the Appaloosa, Arabian horse, and Shetland pony.

In 1959, early rock and roll stars Buddy Holly, Ritchie Valens and The Big Bopper (J.P. Richardson) took off from Mason City Municipal Airport after a concert at the Surf Ballroom in nearby Clear Lake, Iowa, en route to Fargo, N.D. The plane crashed a few miles west of the airport in an historic event later called the Day the Music Died. Holly, Valens, Richardson and pilot Roger Peterson all died in the accident.

=== Modern era (1970–present) ===
During the 1970s, the originally dominant brick and tile industry began to decline, prompting Mason City to diversify its economy. On February 23, 1977, a very rare February tornado occurred in Mason City. Further challenges emerged with the 1980s farm crisis, which severely impacted the Upper Midwest agricultural economy and the economic prospects of nearby farms. This led to a state-wide downturn and migration out of the area. Mason City was the site of the 1993 Iowa murders, and later was the site of a high-profile disappearance investigation, following the abduction of KIMT reporter and news-anchor, Jodi Huisentruit in 1995. Since the mid-1990s, Mason City has focused on revitalizing its downtown area, constructed the Southbridge Mall, a hockey arena, and developed a regional retail economy centered on the west side of town nearing Clear Lake. Since the turn of the 21st century, Mason City has experienced steady community development, and has continued the revitalization of its downtown district and the architecturally significant Park Inn Hotel and First National Bank. In 2008, Mason City experienced extreme flooding where the Winnebago River reached its highest crest recorded in history at 18.72 feet which overtopped the levee system.

== Geography ==
According to the United States Census Bureau, the city has a total area of 28.10 square miles (72.78 km^{2}), of which 27.81 square miles (72.03 km^{2}) is land and 0.29 square miles (0.75 km^{2}) is water. Mason City is in north-central Iowa, and is 120 miles north of the state capital of Des Moines, and 135 miles south of the twin cities of Minneapolis and Saint Paul. The city lies along the Winnebago River, formerly called Lime Creek and Willow Creek, the main outflow of Clear Lake, which is 8 miles to the west. Other creeks within city limits include Camlus Creek, Chelsea Creek, and Ideal Creek. There is also a slough on the northeastern side of the city called Buffalo Slough bordered by Plymouth Road. The vicinity is located within the Winnebago-Shell Rock-Cedar-Iowa River watershed, which later joins the larger Mississippi River System downstream.

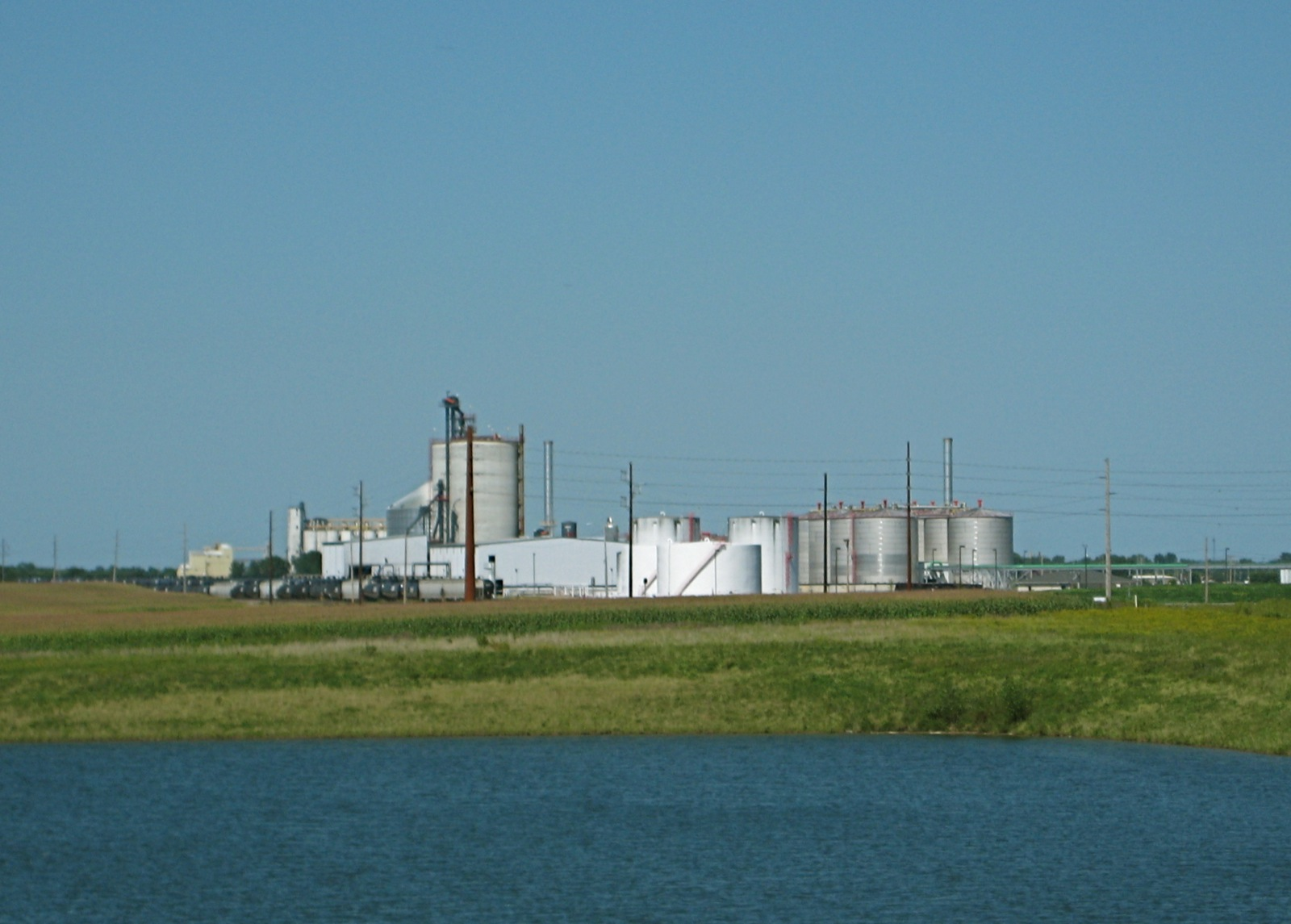
Mason City landscape, Ethanol plant in distance.

The geology of Mason City and other surrounding areas in Cerro Gordo County includes deposits of clay, limestone, dolomite, and sandstone. These sedimentary rocks fueled an important economic sector of longstanding quarrying, brick, and cement production. Much of the remaining land within and near city-limits was once tallgrass prairies, but has now been developed as rich farmland. This region of the Upper Midwest is known as the Prairie Pothole Region includes flat landscapes and glacial lakes.

=== Climate ===
Mason City has a warm-summer humid continental climate (Köppen: Dfb), bordering closely on the hot-summer variant. This area has four distinct seasons, with humid, warm summers and cold, snowy winters.

Climate data for Mason City, Iowa (Mason City Municipal Airport) 1991–2020 normals, extremes 1948–present
Month	Jan	Feb	Mar	Apr	May	Jun	Jul	Aug	Sep	Oct	Nov	Dec	Year
Record high °F (°C)	62 (17)	66 (19)	84 (29)	93 (34)	99 (37)	103 (39)	104 (40)	101 (38)	99 (37)	95 (35)	79 (26)	69 (21)	104 (40)
Mean maximum °F (°C)	44.5 (6.9)	48.0 (8.9)	67.2 (19.6)	82.5 (28.1)	88.4 (31.3)	92.9 (33.8)	92.9 (33.8)	90.5 (32.5)	89.3 (31.8)	81.7 (27.6)	65.8 (18.8)	48.5 (9.2)	95.1 (35.1)
Mean daily maximum °F (°C)	24.2 (−4.3)	28.5 (−1.9)	42.1 (5.6)	57.5 (14.2)	69.6 (20.9)	79.6 (26.4)	82.5 (28.1)	80.2 (26.8)	74.1 (23.4)	59.9 (15.5)	43.6 (6.4)	29.7 (−1.3)	56.0 (13.3)
Daily mean °F (°C)	15.7 (−9.1)	20.0 (−6.7)	32.9 (0.5)	46.0 (7.8)	58.2 (14.6)	68.5 (20.3)	71.5 (21.9)	68.9 (20.5)	61.4 (16.3)	48.2 (9.0)	33.9 (1.1)	21.6 (−5.8)	45.6 (7.6)
Mean daily minimum °F (°C)	7.2 (−13.8)	11.4 (−11.4)	23.6 (−4.7)	34.5 (1.4)	46.8 (8.2)	57.3 (14.1)	60.5 (15.8)	57.6 (14.2)	48.8 (9.3)	36.6 (2.6)	24.3 (−4.3)	13.5 (−10.3)	35.2 (1.8)
Mean minimum °F (°C)	−16.0 (−26.7)	−10.6 (−23.7)	0.5 (−17.5)	18.7 (−7.4)	31.9 (−0.1)	44.2 (6.8)	49.2 (9.6)	46.2 (7.9)	32.7 (0.4)	20.1 (−6.6)	6.1 (−14.4)	−9.0 (−22.8)	−19.4 (−28.6)
Record low °F (°C)	−31 (−35)	−32 (−36)	−28 (−33)	6 (−14)	22 (−6)	36 (2)	42 (6)	35 (2)	24 (−4)	12 (−11)	−16 (−27)	−26 (−32)	−32 (−36)
Average precipitation inches (mm)	0.89 (23)	1.22 (31)	2.29 (58)	4.15 (105)	5.15 (131)	5.39 (137)	4.43 (113)	3.79 (96)	3.45 (88)	2.53 (64)	1.67 (42)	1.29 (33)	36.25 (921)
Average snowfall inches (cm)	11.3 (29)	10.0 (25)	7.0 (18)	3.0 (7.6)	0.3 (0.76)	0.0 (0.0)	0.0 (0.0)	0.0 (0.0)	0.0 (0.0)	0.4 (1.0)	3.0 (7.6)	9.4 (24)	44.4 (113)
Average precipitation days (≥ 0.01 in)	8.1	7.9	9.4	11.7	13.7	11.9	9.6	9.2	9.0	8.9	7.8	8.4	115.6
Average snowy days (≥ 0.1 in)	7.7	6.2	3.8	1.7	0.1	0.0	0.0	0.0	0.0	0.5	3.2	7.0	30.2
Source: NOAA

== Demographics ==
Historical population
Census	Pop.	Note	%±
1870	1,183		—
1880	2,510		112.2%
1890	4,007		59.6%
1900	6,747		68.4%
1910	11,230		66.4%
1920	20,065		78.7%
1930	23,304		16.1%
1940	27,080		16.2%
1950	27,980		3.3%
1960	30,642		9.5%
1970	30,379		−0.9%
1980	30,144		−0.8%
1990	29,040		−3.7%
2000	29,172		0.5%
2010	28,079		−3.7%
2020	27,338		−2.6%
Iowa Data Center

=== 2020 census ===
As of the 2020 census, Mason City had a population of 27,338 and 12,271 households, of which 6,838 were families. The population density was 981.4 inhabitants per square mile (378.9/km^{2}). There were 13,584 housing units at an average density of 487.7 per square mile (188.3/km^{2}), of which 9.7% were vacant; the homeowner vacancy rate was 2.8% and the rental vacancy rate was 10.4%.

94.8% of residents lived in urban areas, while 5.2% lived in rural areas.

Of the 12,271 households, 23.3% had children under the age of 18 living in them. Of all households, 40.1% were married-couple households, 8.0% were cohabitating couples, 30.6% were households with a female householder and no spouse or partner present, and 21.3% were households with a male householder and no spouse or partner present. About 44.3% were non-families; 37.5% of all households were made up of individuals, and 16.3% had someone living alone who was 65 years of age or older.

The median age was 42.7 years; 22.6% of residents were under the age of 20 (including 20.3% under 18), 6.3% were from 20 to 24, 23.6% were from 25 to 44, 25.3% were from 45 to 64, and 22.2% were 65 years of age or older. The gender makeup of the city was 48.3% male and 51.7% female, or 93.3 males for every 100 females and 91.6 males for every 100 females age 18 and over.

Racial composition as of the 2020 census
Race	Number	Percent
White	23,793	87.0%
Black or African American	791	2.9%
American Indian and Alaska Native	125	0.5%
Asian	406	1.5%
Native Hawaiian and Other Pacific Islander	125	0.5%
Some other race	529	1.9%
Two or more races	1,569	5.7%
Hispanic or Latino (of any race)	1,820	6.7%

=== 2010 census ===
As of the census of 2010, there were 28,079 people, 12,366 households, and 7,210 families living in the city. The population density was 1,009.7 inhabitants per square mile (389.8/km^{2}). There were 13,352 housing units at an average density of 480.1 units per square mile (185.4 units/km^{2}). The racial makeup of the city was 93.8% White, 1.8% African American, 0.3% Native American, 0.9% Asian, 1.3% from other races, and 1.9% from two or more races. Hispanic or Latino of any race were 5.1% of the population.

There were 12,366 households, of which 26.8% had children under the age of 18 living with them, 43.2% were married couples living together, 10.8% had a female householder with no husband present, 4.3% had a male householder with no wife present, and 41.7% were non-families. Of all households, 35.0% were made up of individuals, and 13.4% had someone living alone who was 65 years of age or older. The average household size was 2.20 and the average family size was 2.83.

The median age in the city was 40.9 years. 21.9% of residents were under the age of 18; 9.7% were between the ages of 18 and 24; 23.1% were from 25 to 44; 28.2% were from 45 to 64, and 17.1% were 65 years of age or older. The gender makeup of the city was 48.2% male and 51.8% female.

=== 2000 census ===
As of the census of 2000, there were 29,172 people, 12,368 households, and 7,507 families living in the city. The population density was 1,131.3 inhabitants per square mile (436.8/km^{2}). There were 13,029 housing units at an average density of 505.3 units per square mile (195.1 units/km^{2}). The racial makeup of the city was 95.40% White, 1.17% African American, 0.18% Native American, 0.77% Asian, 0.01% Pacific Islander, 1.07% from other races, and 1.40% from two or more races. Hispanic or Latino of any race were 3.45% of the population.

There were 12,368 households, out of which 28.4% had children under the age of 18 living with them, 47.4% were married couples living together, 10.3% had a female householder with no husband present, and 39.3% were non-families. Of all households, 33.5% were made up of individuals, and 14.6% had someone living alone who was 65 years of age or older. The average household size was 2.27 and the average family size was 2.90.

In the city the population was spread out, with 23.6% under the age of 18, 10.2% from 18 to 24, 26.7% from 25 to 44, 21.7% from 45 to 64, and 17.9% who were 65 years of age or older. The median age was 38 years. For every 100 females, there were 90.0 males. For every 100 females age 18 and over, there were 85.8 males.

The median income for a household in the city was $33,852, and the median income for a family was $45,160. Males had a median income of $32,451 versus $21,756 for females. The per capita income for the city was $18,899. About 7.2% of families and 10.0% of the population were below the poverty line, including 10.9% of those under age 18 and 10.1% of those age 65 or over.

== Economy ==
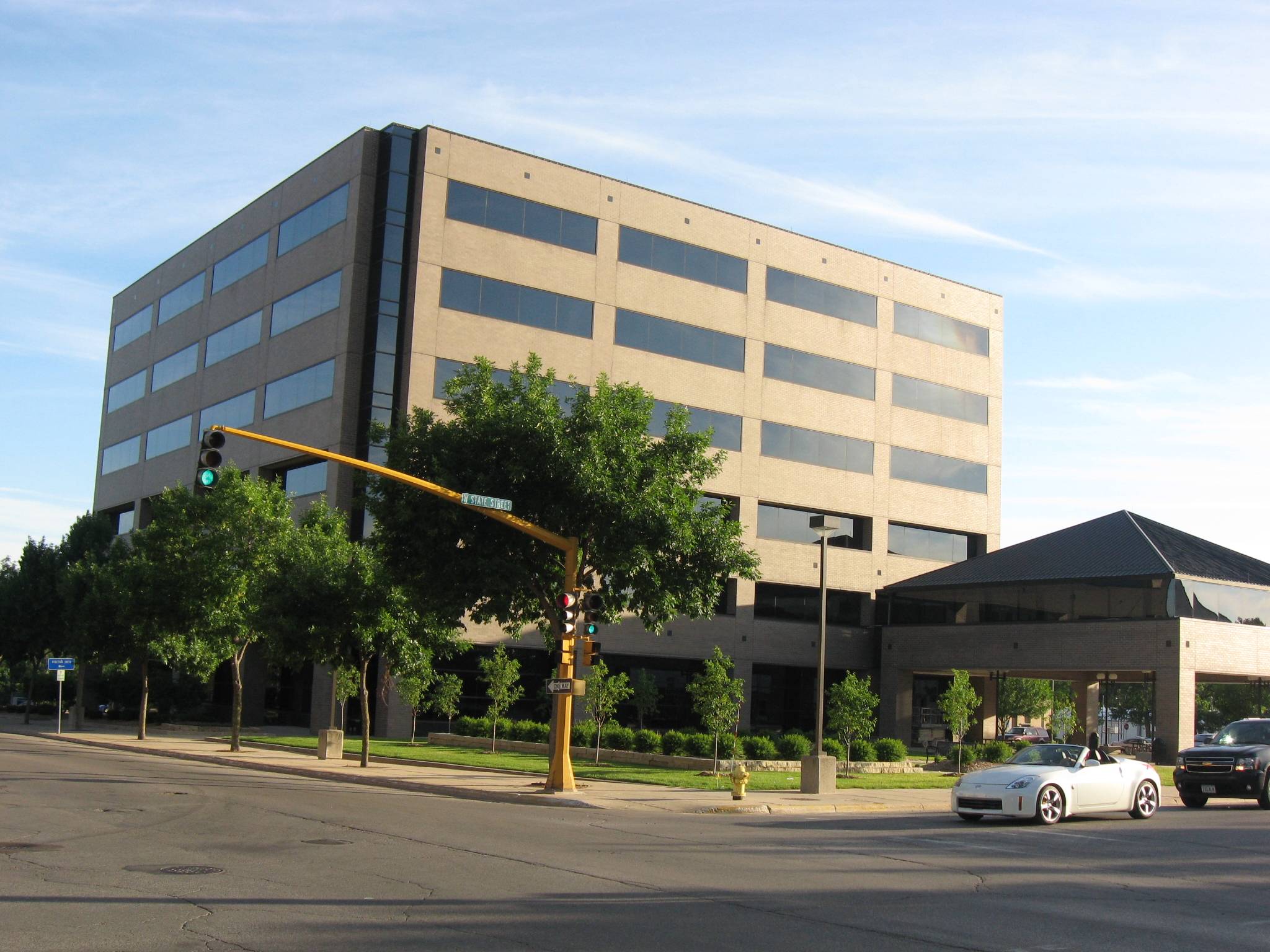
Former Principal Financial Group Building

Mason City has a diverse local economy that is regionally marketed with other nearby areas as the North Iowa Corridor. The largest sectors are healthcare, retail, education, and manufacturing services. The largest employer is the MercyOne operated North Iowa Medical Center. It is region's largest hospital and employs over 2,000 workers and 400 medical providers.

Other major employers include door manufacturer Curries (part of Swedish conglomerate Assa Abloy), Woodhardbor Cabinetry Manufacturers, North Iowa Area Community College, Mason City Community School District, Principal Financial, Cargill Kitchen Solutions, Stellar Industries, Walmart, Menards, Target Corporation, Smithfield, Hy-Vee, and the Kraft Foods plant that produces the nation's entire supply of refrigerated ready-to-eat Jell-O pudding snacks.

Other major employers within twenty miles include McKesson Corporation, Winnebago Industries, and Sukup Manufacturing. Mason City is also a major production center for Portland cement and is home to a Heidelberg Materials cement plant, and an idled Holcim cement plant. In November 2007, Reyes Holding/Martin-Brower opened a distribution facility serving McDonald's in 5 states.

== Government ==
Mason City is governed by a Mayor-Council form of government. The City Council has six members; two are elected at-large and the other four are from city wards. Each ward is a quadrant of the municipality. The city executive is the mayor, who like the councilors is elected to a four-year term. There is also a full-time city administrator who oversees the day-to-day operations of the local government. The current city administrator is Aaron Burnett who has served since 2018. The council devolves certain powers to appointed commissions, such as the Parks and Recreation Board and Planning and Zoning Commission, among others.

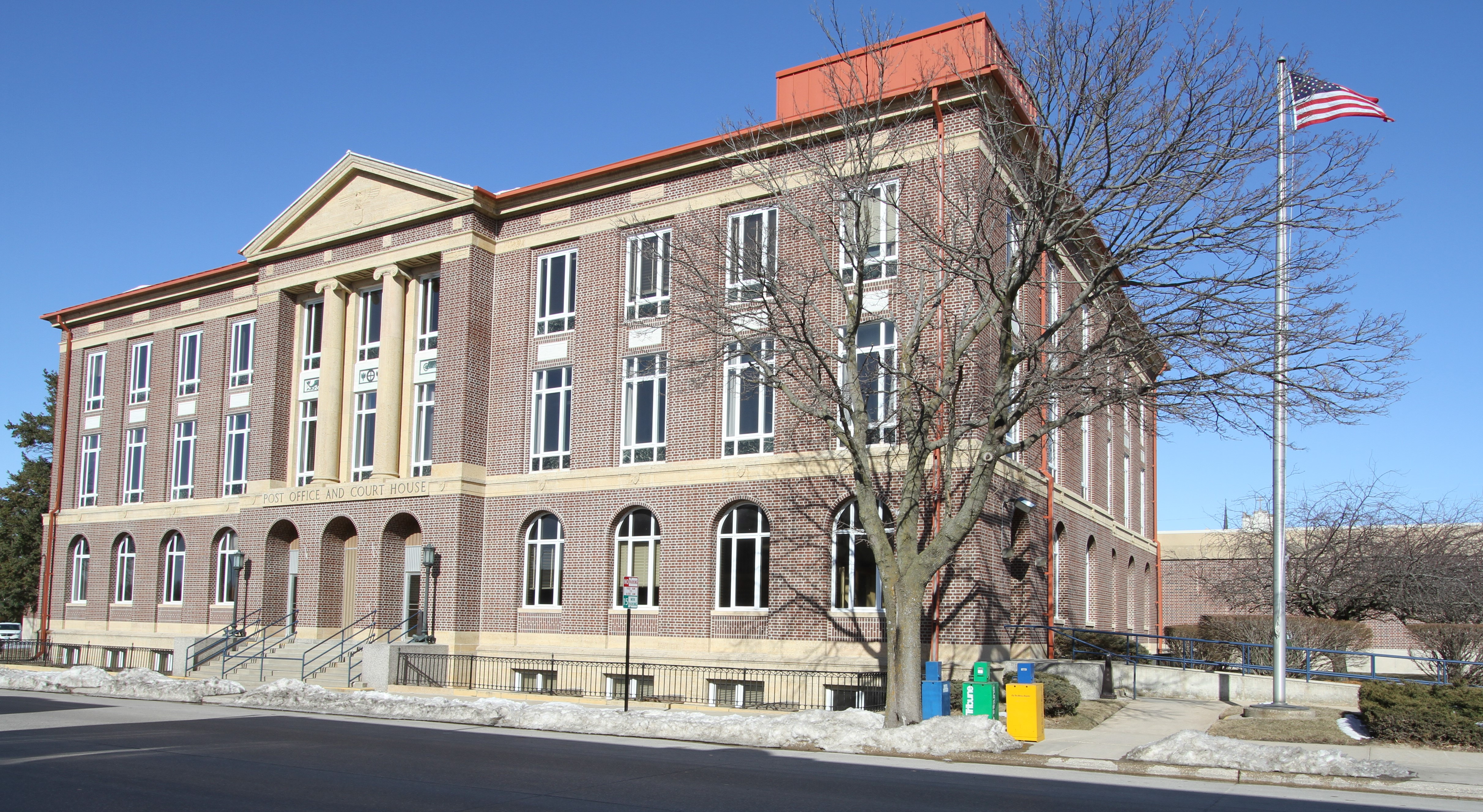
Mason City Post Office and Federal Courthouse

Mason City Government (2025–27) Term
Position	Name
Mayor	John Lee
At-Large Councilor	Paul Adams
At-Large Councilor	Tim Latham
First Ward Councilor	Jeff Hines
Second Ward Councilor	Will Symonds
Third Ward Councilor	Joshua Masson
Fourth Ward Councilor	John Saszewski

For statehouse elections, Mason City and the surrounding area are located in the 59th Iowa House District (Christian Hermanson) and Iowa's 30th Senate district (Doug Campbell). Nationally, Mason City is in Iowa's 2nd Congressional District, represented by Ashley Hinson. Iowa's two current United States senators are Chuck Grassley and Joni Ernst, both of New Hartford and Red Oak respectively.

Mason City is in state District Court 2A, which has offices at the Cerro Gordo County Courthouse. Federally, the city is located in the United States District Court for the Northern District of Iowa. Mason City is home to an unstaffed federal courtroom located in the U.S. Post Office and Courthouse on Delaware Avenue. Otherwise, trials are heard in both Sioux City and Cedar Rapids.

== Arts and culture ==
=== Landmarks, local Architecture, and Prairie School structures ===
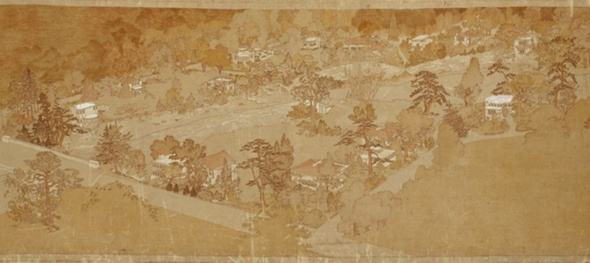
Architectural plans for Rock Crest-Rock Glen development, by Marion Mahony Griffin. Circa 1913.

Mason City is widely known for its collection of Prairie School architecture. The Rock Crest-Rock Glen Historic District is the largest concentration of Prairie School homes in any city in Iowa and the world. At least 32 houses and one commercial building were built in the Prairie Style between 1908 and 1922, 17 of which are listed on the National Register of Historic Places and eight more are contributing properties to a historic district. Many Prairie Style homes in the community exhibit a local style variation of the use of stucco as a common exterior coating. The first two Prairie structures, the Dr. G.C. Stockman House (1908) and the Park Inn Hotel and City National Bank Buildings (1909–1910) were both designed by Frank Lloyd Wright. The hotel and bank, a mixed-use development at the corner of State and Federal Avenues was the first to be commissioned by local attorneys James E. E. Markley and James E. Blythe. Within a year, Wright was hired to design the Stockman House by Markley's neighbor.

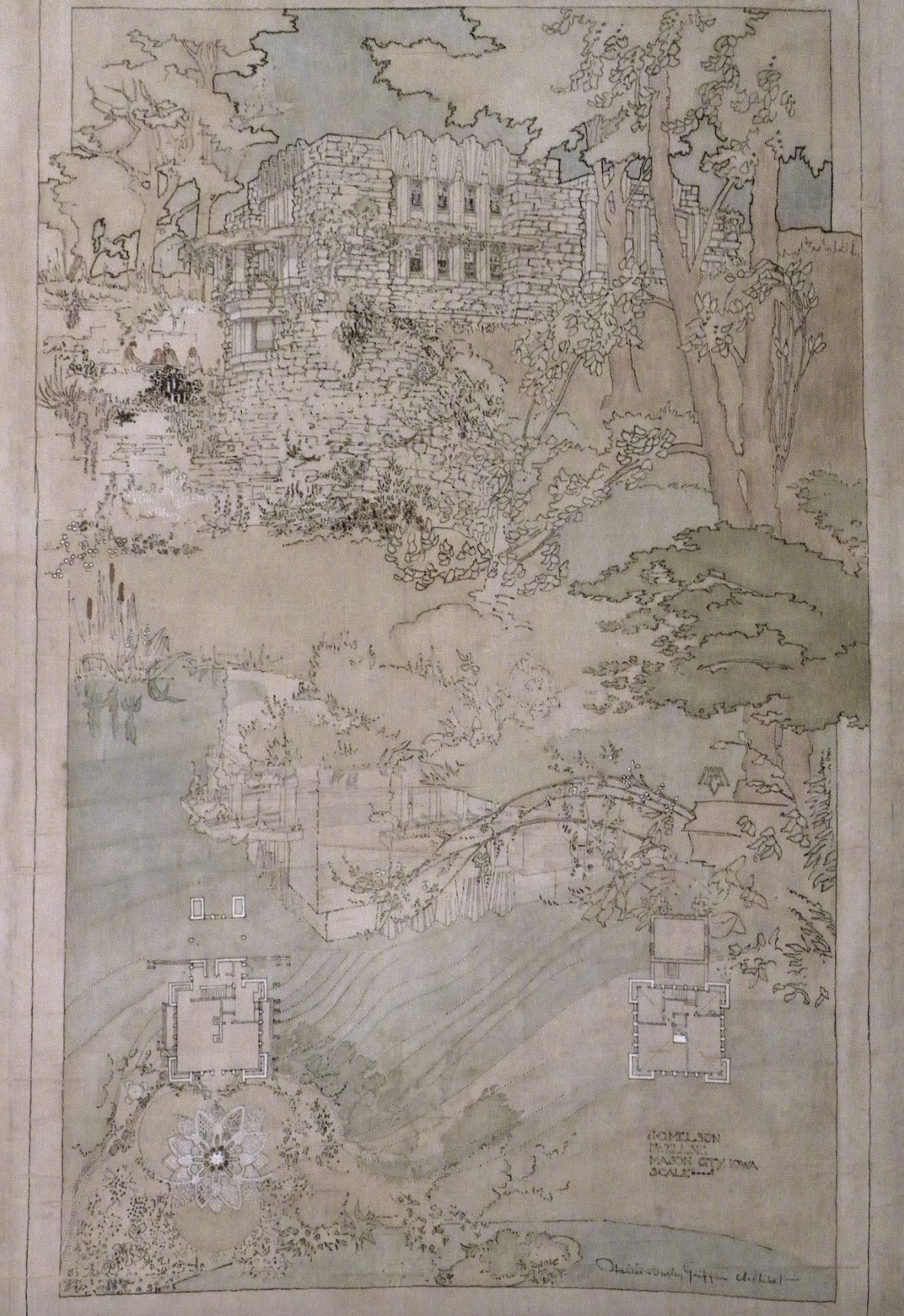
Joshua Melson House plans, by Marion Mahony Griffin. Circa 1914.

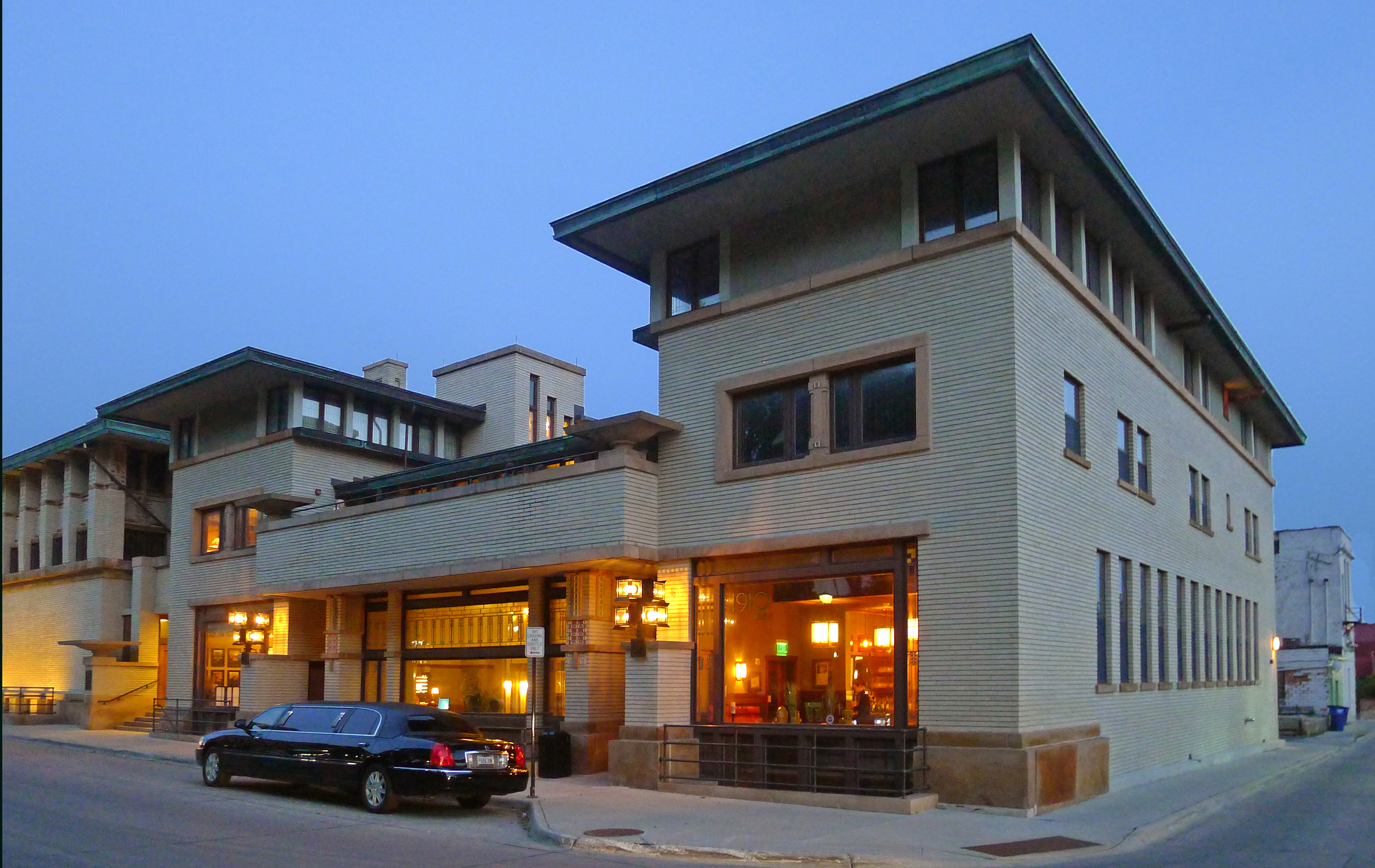
Park Inn Hotel

Both the Park Inn Hotel and Stockman House suffered from neglect and unsympathetic alterations before they were saved by community organizations. In 1989, the Stockman House was moved four blocks to prevent its demolition; it was subsequently restored and opened to the public by the River City Society for Historic Preservation. Likewise, Wright on the Park, Inc. began restoration on the Park Inn Hotel in 2005 and the former City National Bank building in 2007. The organization reopened both buildings as a boutique hotel in August 2011. The Park Inn Hotel is the last remaining of the few hotels that Wright completed during his career and is considered a prototype for Wright's Imperial Hotel, Tokyo.

The Rock Crest–Rock Glen Historic District is a small enclave of single-family homes along the banks of Willow Creek five blocks east of downtown. It is the largest collection of prairie-style homes in a natural setting in the world. It features both Prairie School and Usonian design. Five of these houses were designed by Walter Burley Griffin and Marion Mahony Griffin, two by Francis Barry Byrne, and others by William Drummond, Einar Broaten, and Curtis Besinger.

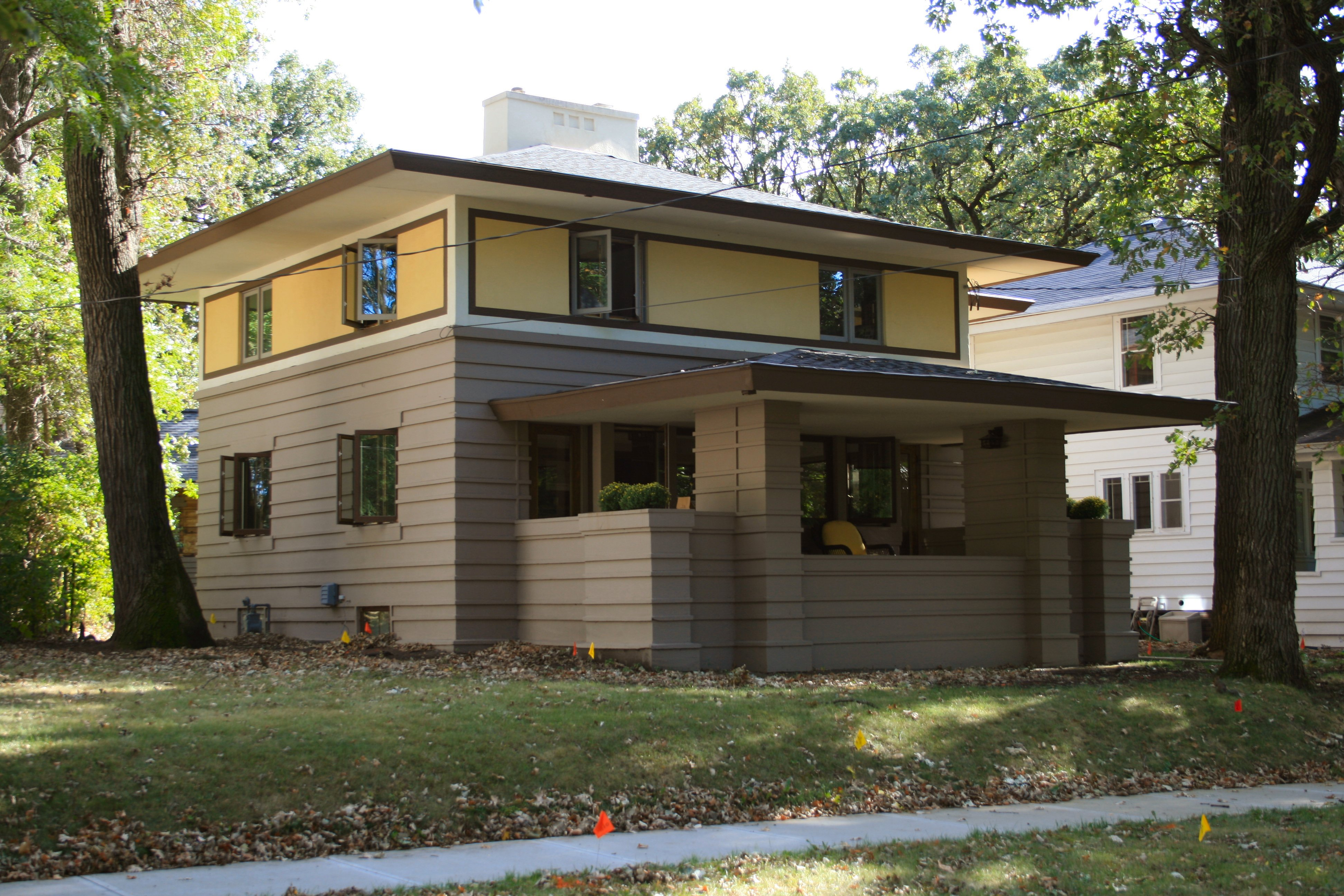
Curtis Yelland House

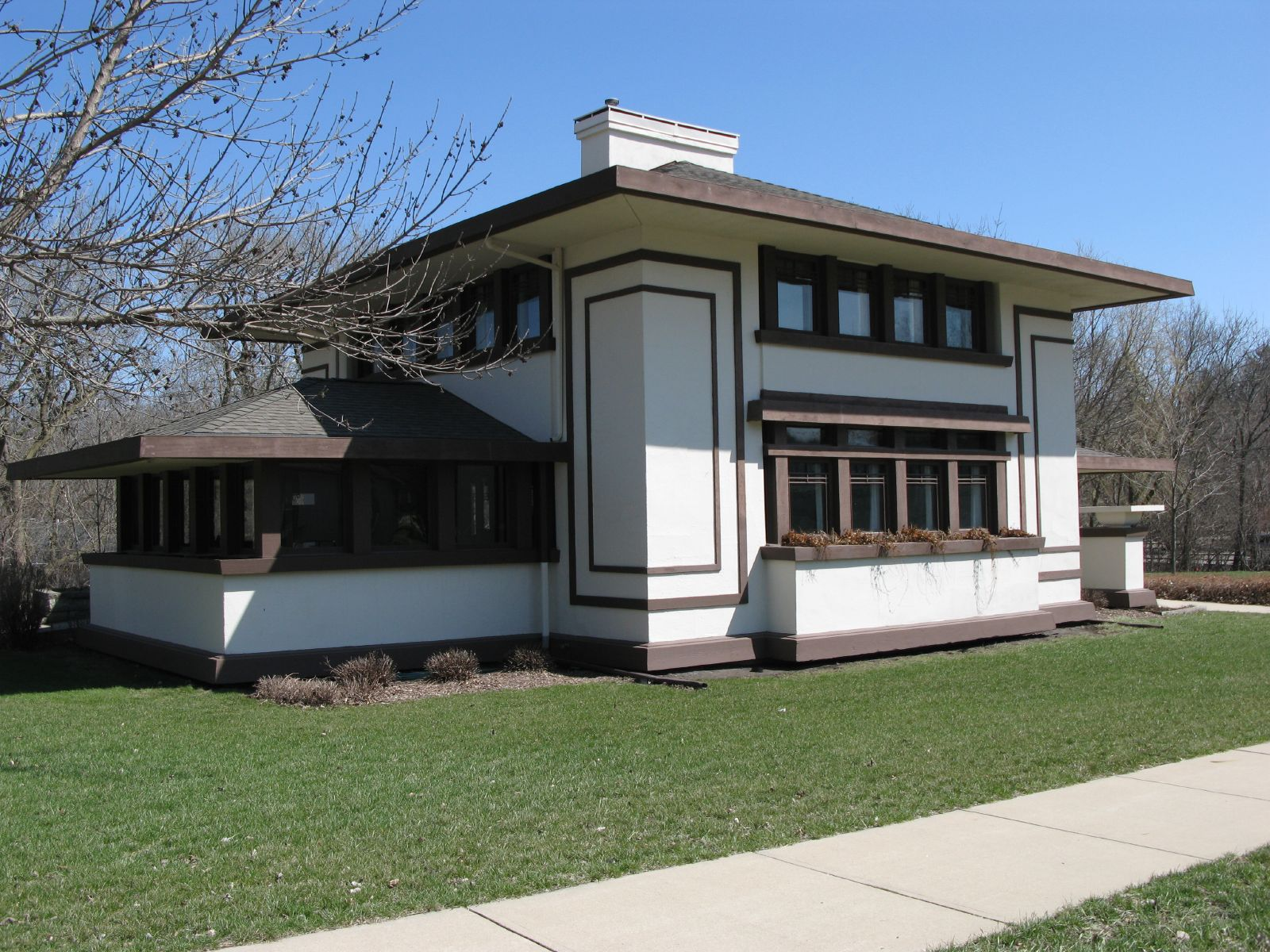
Dr. G.C. Stockman House by Frank Lloyd Wright

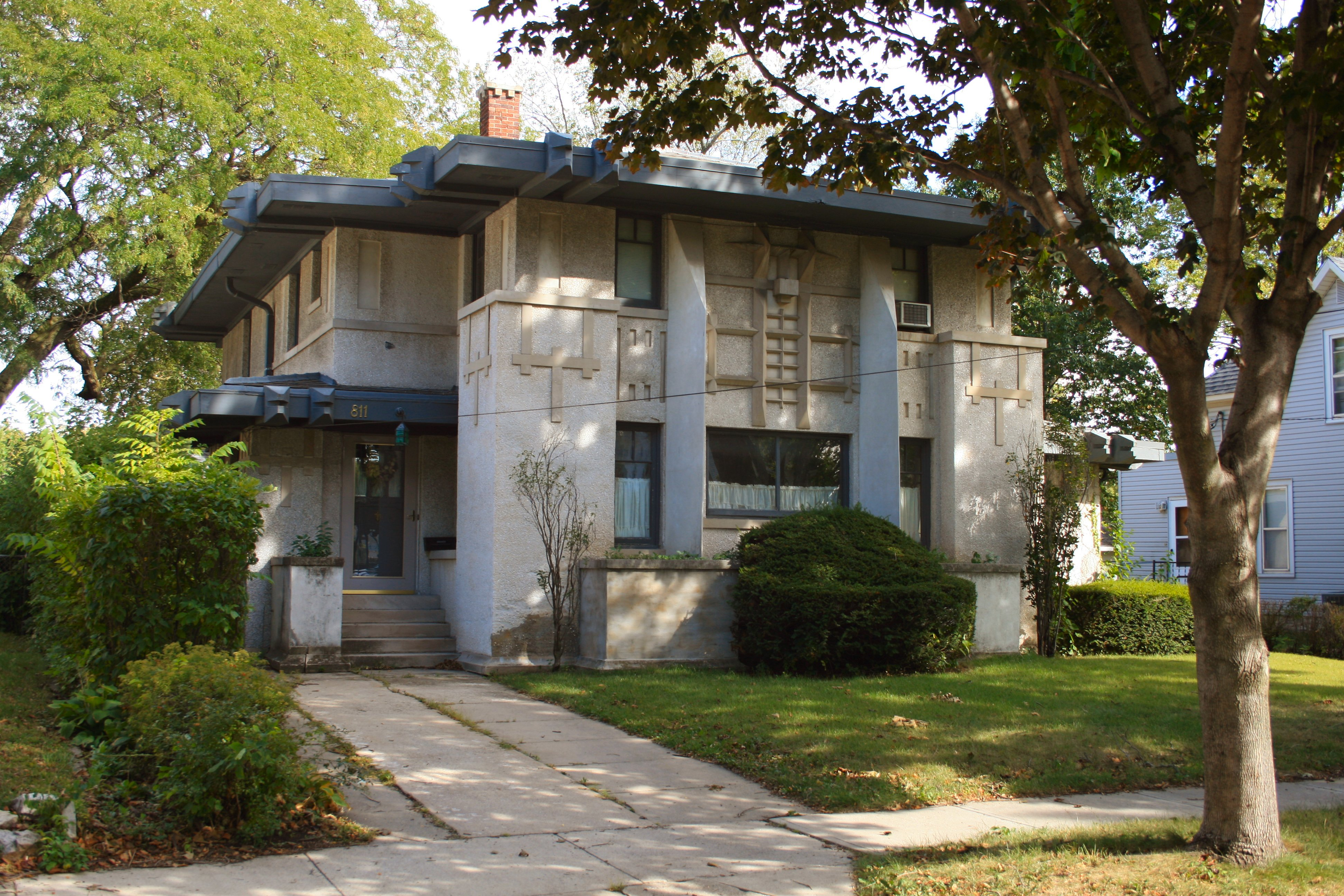
Mier Wolf House

In addition to Prairie Style architecture, Mason City is home to extensive Victorian, American Foursquare, American Craftsman, Bungalow, Mid-Century modern, and Mayan Revival style homes, as well as historic commercial structures, dates from between 1892 and 1940, including the Brick and Tile Building at the intersection of State and Delaware Streets. There is also a rare midwestern example of an International Style home in the city, the William C. and Margaret Egloff House. The Mason City Public Library was designed by Chicago architects Holabird and Root in 1939. The Len Jus Building on North Federal Avenue has an extremely rare sheet-metal facade, it had been placed on the Iowa Historic Preservation Alliance's Most Endangered list because of its poor repair and indifferent ownership, but is now being rehabilitated by the new owner.

=== Musical heritage ===
Meredith Willson, the city's "favorite son", grew up in Mason City and played in the Mason City Symphonic Band as a high school student. Willson's crowning achievement was the famous stage musical The Music Man. Many of the characters in it were based on people Willson knew from his childhood in Mason City. In 1934, both the band and orchestra of Mason City High School were the state champions in both categories. Mason City also features the Parker's Opera House and the region's largest theater, the North Iowa Auditorium, situated on the campus of North Iowa Area Community College.

Music Man Square is located near downtown and features multiple exhibits related to Meredith Willson and The Music Man, including Willson's boyhood home, the Meredith Willson Museum, and a replica streetscape from the musical.

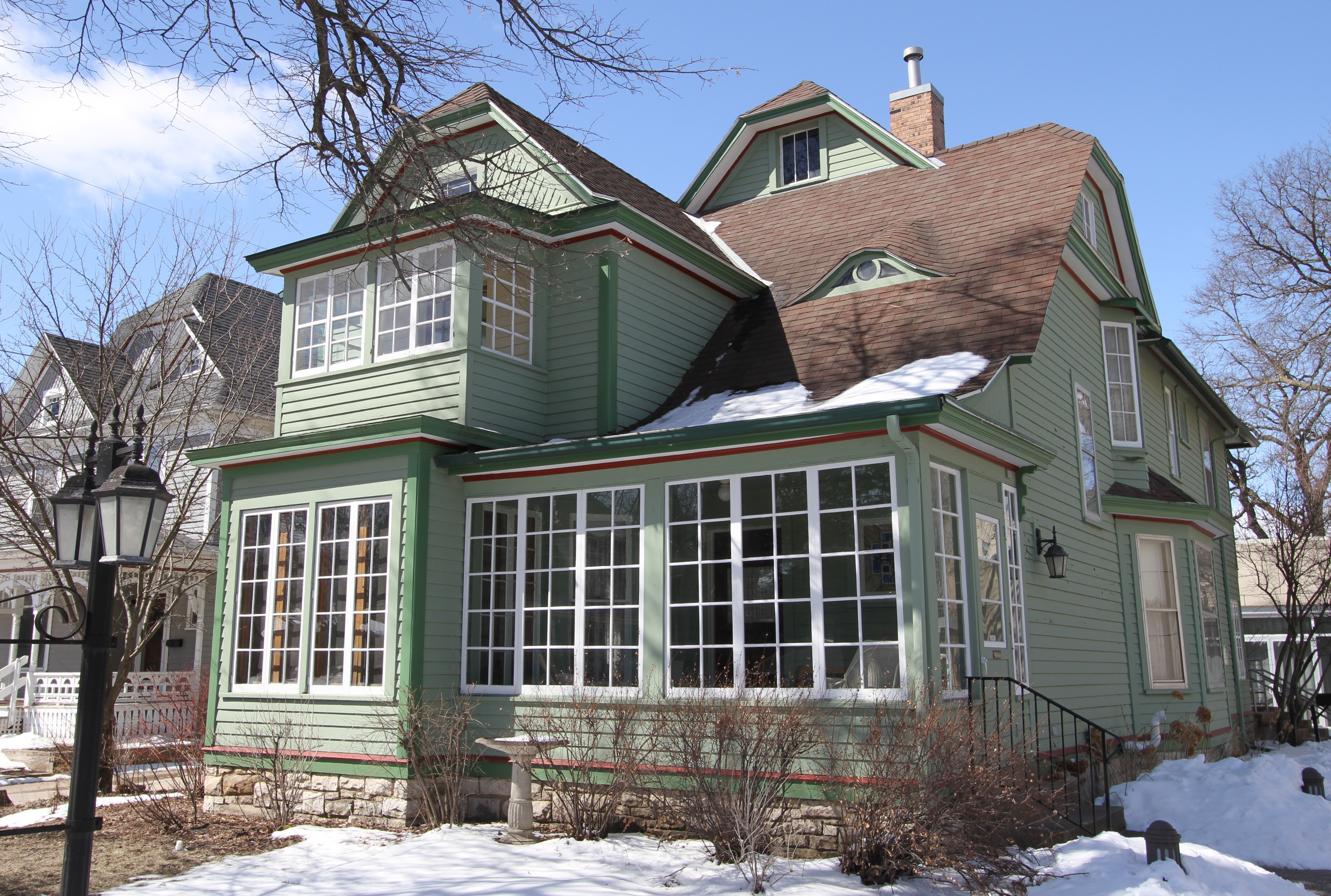
Meredith Willson Home

=== Events and festivals ===
In late May or early June Mason City holds an annual celebration of its musical heritage called The North Iowa Band Festival. School bands from across the Midwest compete during the parade to be named the best band. The home bands, Mason City High School and Newman Catholic High School Marching Bands, do not compete but do perform in the parade. Meredith Willson returned to participate in the festival many times.

=== Public art and museum ===
Mason City is home of the Charles H. MacNider Art Museum, a non-profit, municipally owned institution that opened in 1966. The museum's collection includes works of American art, temporary exhibits, the famous Bil Baird puppets, and a wide range of ceramics. The museum also provides art classes as well as enrichment programs for Mason City residents and visitors.

The building that the museum resides in was previously a private residence built in the English Tudor style, designed by Carl A. Gage of Minneapolis. In 1964, General and Mrs. Hanford MacNider purchased the property, intending to donate it to the city to create a public museum and arts center. Hanford MacNinder, the son of the museum's namesake, was one of World War I’s most decorated soldiers. He later served as the 4th National Commander of the American Legion, the United States Assistant Secretary of War, and the United States Ambassador to Canada.

Since 2014, Mason City has hosted River City Sculptures on Parade, an annual public art walk featuring rotating artists. Each year, the city purchases the most-popular rotating sculpture to add to the permanent collection.

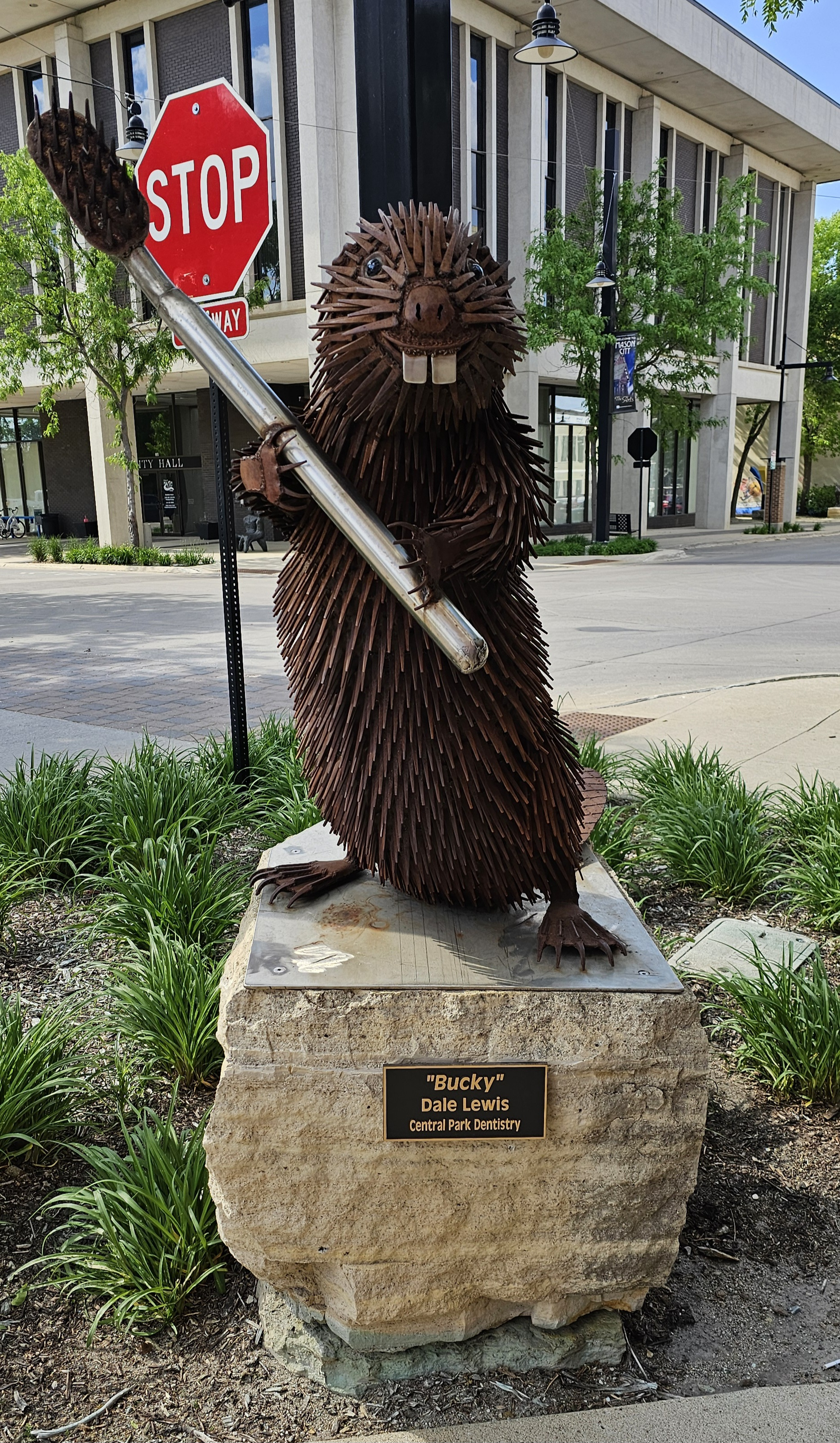
Example of Sculptures on Parade

== Education ==
=== Primary and secondary schools ===
Mason City Community School District operates the following schools: Harding Elementary School, Hoover Elementary School, Jefferson Elementary School, Roosevelt Elementary School, Lincoln Intermediate School (5–6), John Adams Junior High School (7–8), Mason City High School, (9–12), Mason City Alternative High School, Madison Early Childhood Center. Past schools include Lincoln, Washington, Grant, Central Heights, Central, McKinley, Wilson, Jackson, Monroe and Garfield elementary schools, and Monroe and Roosevelt junior high schools.

Newman Catholic Elementary/Middle School, Newman Catholic High School, and North Iowa Christian School. Mason City is also the home of the Worldwide College of Auctioning founded in 1933 by the well-known auctioneer Col. Joe Reisch and subsequently owned/operated for many years by Col. Gordon E. Taylor.

=== Postsecondary education ===
Mason City is home to several institutions of higher education, including the North Iowa Area Community College (NIACC, formerly Mason City Junior College), the first public two-year junior college in the state, and a branch of Buena Vista University located on the NIACC campus.

== Parks and recreation ==
Mason City has many parks, trails, and recreational areas for people to use. The municipal park system covers over 600 acres in total, with the largest park, Lester Milligan Park, at 81 acres. There are over 75 miles of biking trails (on-street and off-street), walking trails, and sidewalks within city limits. Amenities at local parks include playgrounds, shelters, trails, and sports courts. Some park amenities, including those in Parker's Woods Park and East Park, were built by the National Youth Administration and the Works Progress Administration that were organized under the New Deal during the Great Depression.

There are over 30 sites of public recreation within city limits, including but not limited to East Park, West Park, Georgia Hanford Park, Monroe Park, Kentucky Waterworks Park, Asbury Park, Parker's Woods and MacNider Woods. Margaret MacNider City park and campgrounds is the site of the municipal pool and waterpark.

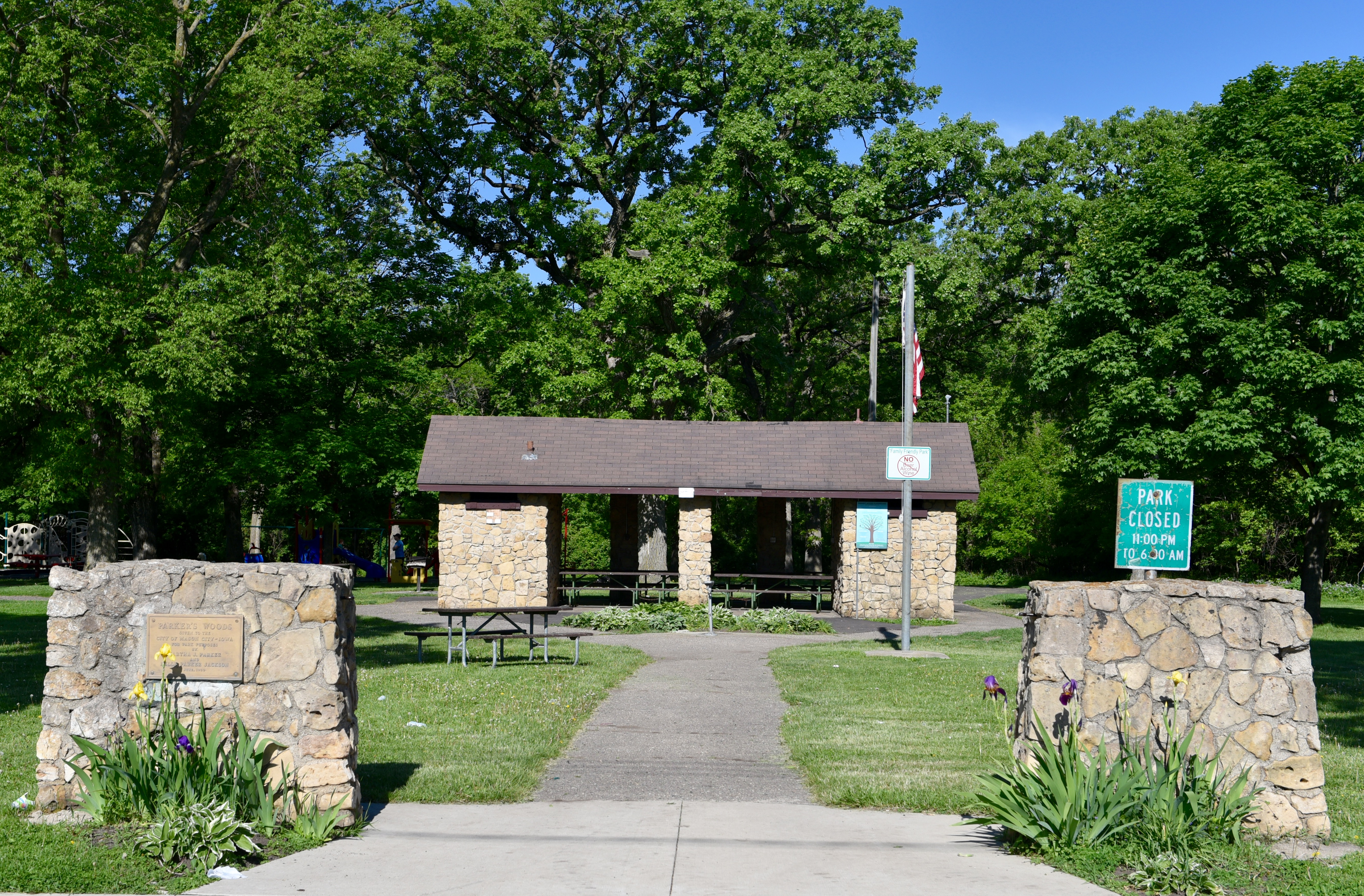
Parker's Woods Park and Historic District

A trail network known as Prairie Rock Trails is located in the city. It was developed by Rock Solid Trail Contracting in 2024. It is planned to someday include over 20 miles of trails and 600 acres of green space. This network includes the Highline rail trail, built on a former Union Pacific line. Opened in 2025, the trail system is anchored by the Prairie Rock Trails Bike Park. The bike park, which includes mountain bike trails, jumps, and hills, was built on the site of the former north-end Decker Meatpacking Plant. The trails also connect north to the Lime Creek Nature Center which is outside city limits in Cerro Gordo County.

== Infrastructure ==
=== Public transit ===
Mason City Transit provides fixed-route, paratransit, and demand-response mass transit services to the city. This system comprises five lines, each connecting a different quadrant of Mason City to a central transfer station on the north edge of Central Park in downtown Mason City. The lines are named the West Central Blue route, the North Central Green route, the South Central Orange route, the East Central Red route, and the Northwest Purple route, which connects the rural NIACC campus to the city. Fares begin at ¢50 for a one-way ticket, with buses picking patrons up at designated line stops twice per hour.

Intercity bus service is provided by Jefferson Lines, with a stop at Mason City Municipal Airport. Routes connect to Minneapolis-Des Moines-Kansas City.

=== Roadways ===
Most of Mason City is served by Iowa Highway 122 and U.S. Route 65. U.S. Route 18 now bypasses the city to the south. Interstate 35 (eight miles to the west) serves the city as well. U.S. Route 18 is also known as the Avenue of the Saints, an expressway connecting St. Louis and Saint Paul, Minnesota via Cedar Rapids and Waterloo, Iowa. Mason City's street system is divided north to south by Federal Avenue, with streets east of Federal Avenue named chronologically for U.S. states and the western streets named for U.S. presidents. The historic Jefferson Highway runs through Mason City and is concurrent with Federal Avenue and Highway 65.

=== Rail service ===
Mason City is home to the Iowa Traction Railway. The IATR is one of the last surviving electric interurban railroads in the U.S., and the only one that still uses electric locomotives to haul freight in regular service.

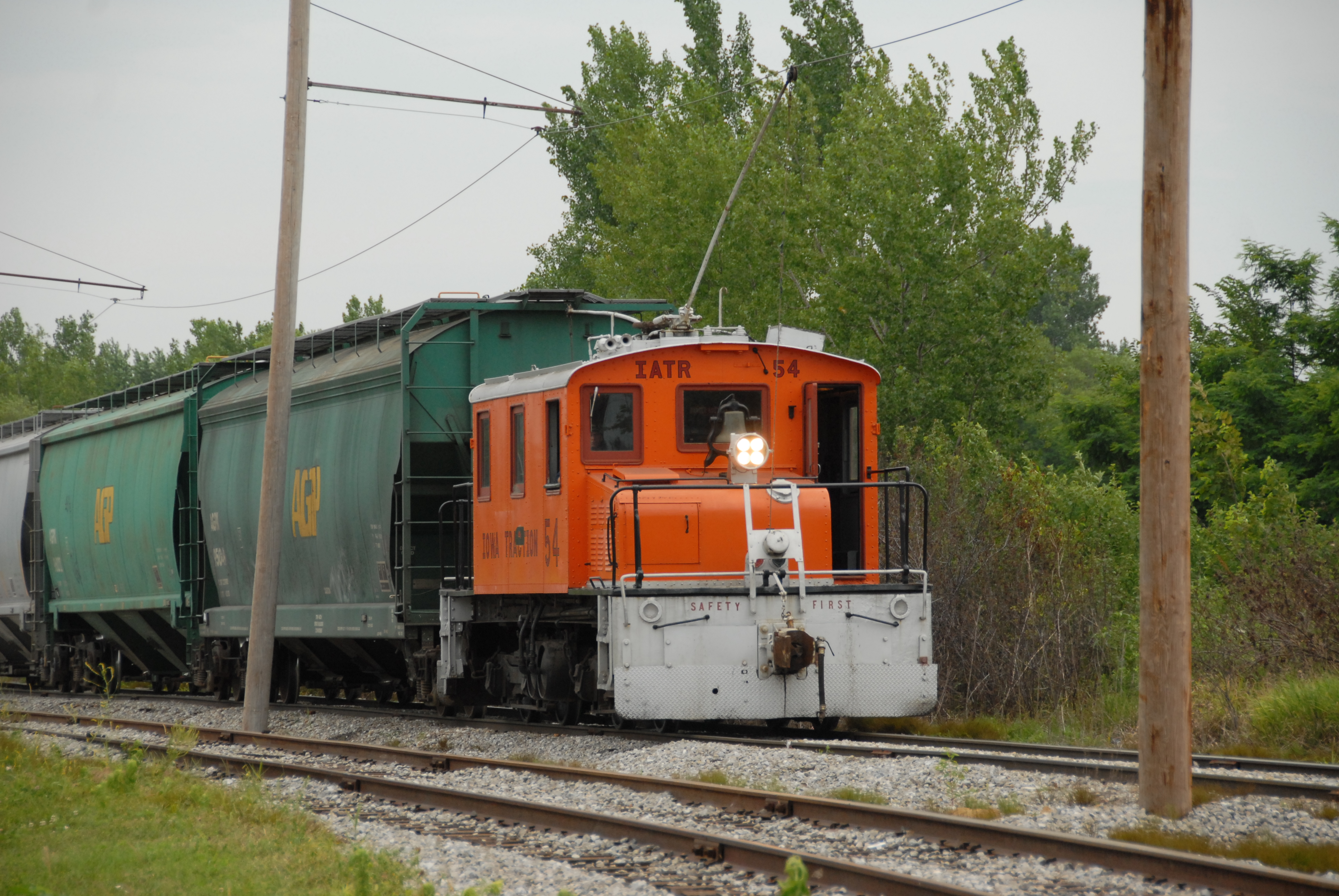
Iowa Traction Railway

Mason City also is served by the Canadian Pacific Railway and Union Pacific Railroad. The Canadian Pacific track is part of its US subsidiary the Dakota, Minnesota and Eastern Railroad (former I&M Rail Link and Milwaukee Road) trackage. The Union Pacific track was inherited from the Chicago and North Western Transportation Company when it bought it in the 1990s. Much of the trackage is composed of the old Chicago, Rock Island, and Pacific Railroad's (Rock Island Railroad). While the Iowa Northern Railway does not operate in the city of Mason City, it does serve other communities in the Mason City micropolitan statistical area. The Iowa Northern has facilities in Manly, Iowa.

=== Airports ===
The city also hosts Mason City Municipal Airport, (MCW) with commercial service provided by United Airlines direct to Chicago O'Hare International Airport for further connecting flights.

== Sports ==
Mason City has some history of minor league and amateur sports teams despite its relatively small size as a sports-market. The North Iowa Bulls are a junior ice hockey team that first began play in 2011 as member of the North American 3 Hockey League (NA3HL). The Bulls won the league championship in 2013, 2014, 2016, and 2021, while also winning the Tier III National Championship in 2013 and 2015. The Bulls moved up to the Tier II North American Hockey League (NAHL) and rebranded the Tier III team as the Mason City Toros in 2021. The North Iowa Bulls have moved to Dallas, TX as of 2026, with the Toros (rebranded as the North Iowa Bulls) remaining at the Tier III level.

Mason City was home to minor league baseball. The Mason City Cementmakers (1912) and Mason City Claydiggers (1915–1917) played as members of the Iowa State League (1912) and Central Association (1915–1917). The teams played at Hanford Park. The Mason City Bats of the short-lived Great Central League played baseball here in 1994.

College Football Hall of Fame coach Barry Alvarez led Mason City High School to the 1978 Class 4A state football championship with a 15–13 victory over Dubuque Hempstead.

== Media ==
=== Movies and documentaries ===
Mason City served as the inspiration for the fictional town of River City, Iowa, in The Music Man, a musical that was composed and written by Mason City native son Meredith Willson (although the 1962 film, which had its world premiere in Mason City, was shot entirely at Warner Bros. Studios in Burbank, California).

=== Television ===
Mason City is paired with Rochester and Austin, Minnesota, to form a media market that spans five Southern Minnesota counties, and seven in Northern Iowa.

- KIMT (CBS)
- KAAL (ABC)
- KTTC (NBC)
- KSMQ (PBS)
- KYIN (PBS)
- KXLT (FOX)

=== Radio ===
AM radio stations
Frequency	Call sign	Name	Format	Ref.
1010	KRNI	Iowa Public Radio	Public Radio	
1300	KGLO		News/Talk	
1490	KRIB		Oldies	

FM radio stations
Frequency	Call sign	Name	Format	Ref.
88.5	KBDC	American Family Radio	Christian	
90.7	K2814BA (KHKE Translator)		Classical	
91.5	KNSM	Iowa Public Radio	Public radio	
92.5	K223AB (KJLY Translator)		Christian	
93.9	KIAI	The Country Moose	Country	
97.9	KCMR		Christian	
98.7	KSMA	98.7 KISS Country	Country	
99.9	KAUS	US Country 99.9	Country	
103.7	KLKK	103.7 The Fox	Classic rock	
106.1	KLSS	Star 106	Top 40	

=== Newspapers ===
- Globe Gazette – daily newspaper
- North Iowa Local - online, digital daily newspaper

== Notable people ==
- Randolph Powell, actor of television and movies.
- Deborah Ann Turner, physician and also President of national League of Women Voters for two terms of office.
- Barry Alvarez, former head football coach and athletic director at Wisconsin
- Todd Blodgett, Member of White House staff (Reagan-Bush) 1985–87.Also worked with the FBI.
- Bil Baird, puppeteer
- Charles F. Barlow, pediatric neurologist
- Carrie Chapman Catt, woman's suffrage
- Don Eddy, MLB pitcher, raised in Swaledale, Iowa but born in Mason City
- Tanna Frederick, actress
- Walter Burley Griffin, architect
- Jodi Huisentruit, anchorwoman and missing person
- Jack Jenney, jazz musician
- Tim Lannon (born 1951), Creighton University President
- Tim Laudner, Major League Baseball catcher
- Sandra Levinson, executive director and co-founder of the Center for Cuban Studies
- Joe Lillard, NFL running back
- Hanford MacNider (1889–1968), Ambassador to Canada, Brigadier-General in the US Army
- James J. Montague (1873–1941), journalist and poet
- Sonny Onoo, professional wrestling manager
- Jack Rule, Jr., professional golfer
- Scott Sandage (born 1964), historian and author
- Frank Secory, MLB left fielder and umpire
- Ralph Senensky, television director and writer
- Esther J. Walls, librarian and international advocate for literacy
- Meredith Willson, composer and playwright, The Music Man

== Sister city ==
Mason City, Iowa, and Montegrotto Terme, Italy, created a Sister City relationship in the spring of 2005.

== See also ==
- MacNider Art Museum
- Collaborative Summer Library Program
