= Winnebago River =

River in Iowa, United States

Coordinates: 43.040°N 92.941°W

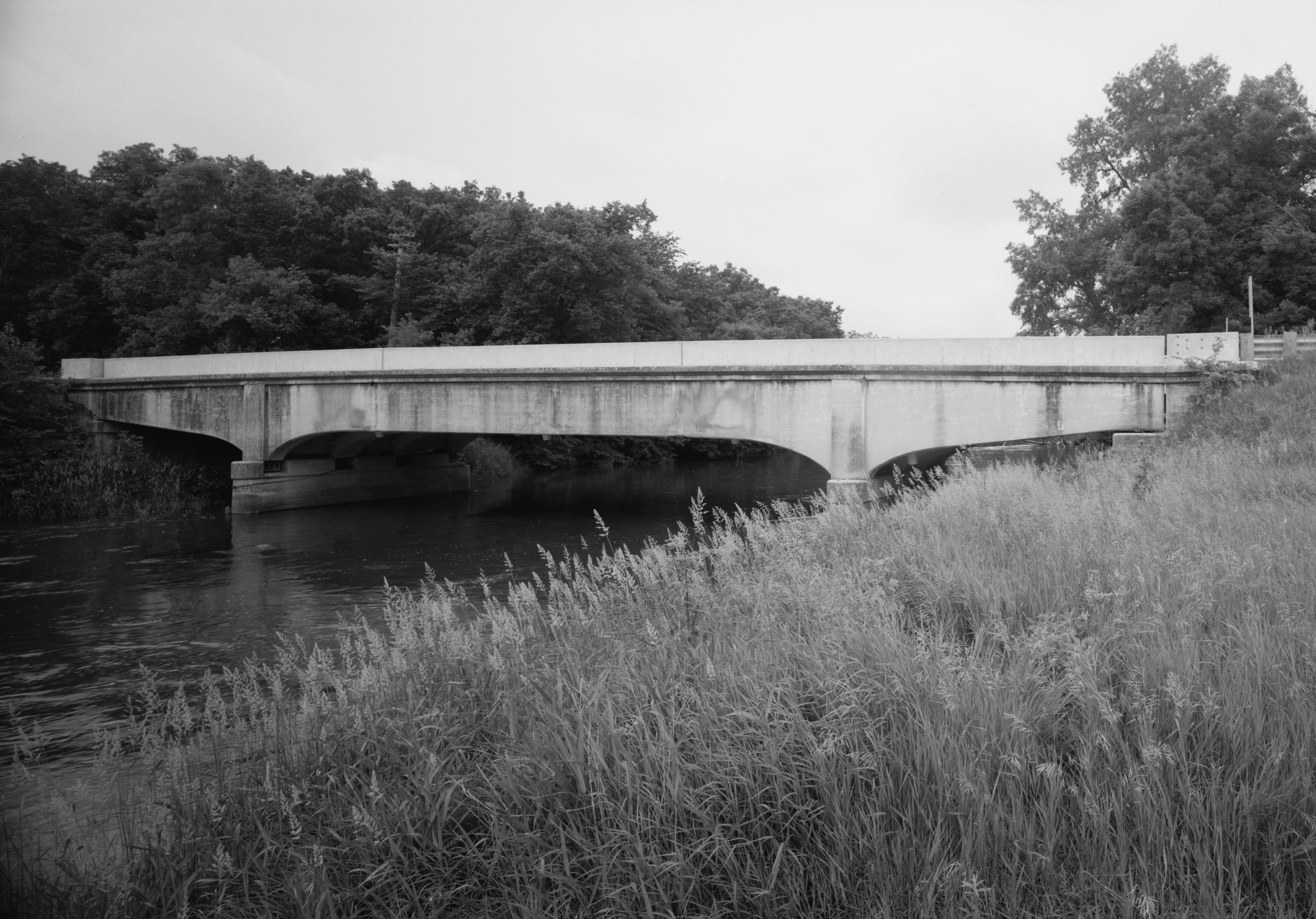
Winnebago River Bridge near Mason City, Iowa.

The Winnebago River is a 72-mile-long (116 km) river in northern Iowa. It is a tributary of the Shell Rock River, part of the Cedar River watershed that flows via the Iowa River to the Mississippi River. The Winnebago River rises in Winnebago County, Iowa, north of Leland and flows south through Forest City, then east and southeast through Mason City on its way to the Shell Rock River at Rockford. Headwater tributaries of the Winnebago River extend north into southern Minnesota.

The Winnebago River measures approximately 330 cubic feet per second at Mason City.

The river was alternately known as Lime Creek, but upon the fame of Meredith Willson's The Music Man, which has a mythical River City widely known to be based on his native Mason City, the locals felt compelled to promote their creek to a river. The U.S. Board on Geographic Names made "Winnebago River" the official name in a 1961 decision. It also runs through Mason City, Iowa.

In 2008, the Winnebago River was subjected to flood waters reaching 18.74 feet. This was the highest flood water stage in recorded history for the Winnebago River. The peak of 18.74 feet was reached on June 8, 2008. The flooding was part in due to severe rainfall in the river's basin between May 29 and June 12 of that year. Iowa had a state average of 9.03 inches during those fourteen days. The normal statewide average for that time is 2.45 inches. According to the USGS report, 77 homes were damaged in Cerro Gordo county, where the Winnebago River runs through Mason City and flows into the Shell Rock River. The damages from the flood in Cerro Gordo county reached an estimated $3 million, while the total damage along the Cedar River and Iowa River basin reached over $495 million. The hardest hit counties were Linn and Johnson counties.

== See also ==
- List of rivers of Iowa
