= List of Iowa tornadoes =

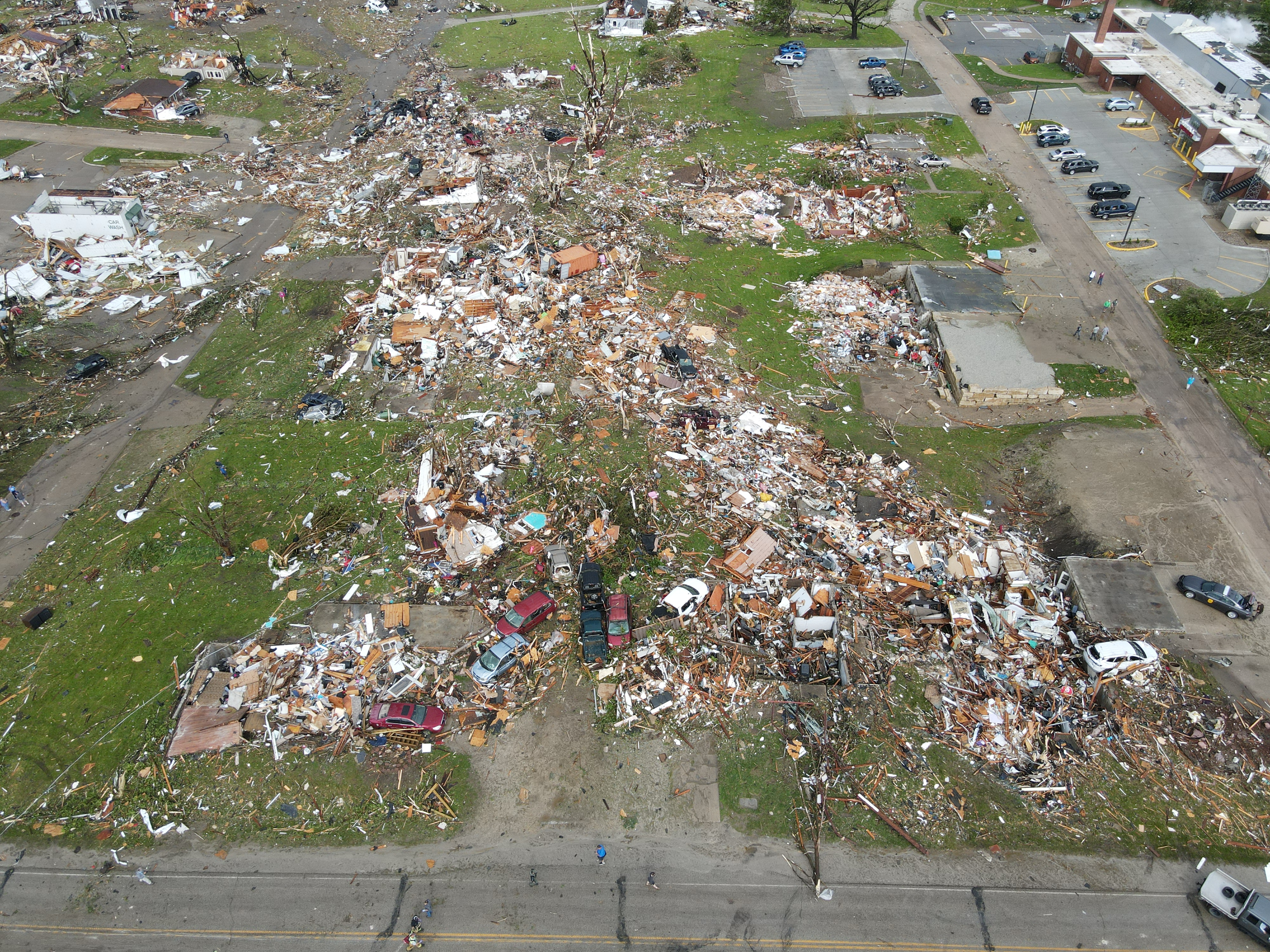
Aerial imagery of damage in Greenfield after the 2024 Greenfield tornado

The U.S state of Iowa experiences multiple tornadoes every year. There have been at least 3,422 recorded tornadoes since 1950. At least 2,340 people have been injured, and 100 people have died due to these tornadoes. There have been multiple tornadoes before 1950, but most of them are not recorded accurately or at all, but the most violent and deadliest tornadoes before 1950 have been recorded. The deadliest tornado was the Camanche tornado, which killed 72 people in Iowa.

2024 was a record-breaking year in Iowa. Iowa saw 125 tornadoes in 2024 which beat the previous record of 120 tornadoes in 2004. In April and May alone, Iowa saw 98 tornadoes, giving the months of April 2024 and May 2024 the second and third most tornadoes in a month, just before May 2004 which saw 57 tornadoes.

The most tornado-prone parts of Iowa are in the northeastern counties. The counties of Delaware, Black Hawk, Buchanan, Linn, and Benton on average have seen at least one strong tornado each year from 1953 to 2008.

== Climatology ==
A tornado is a violent column of air that extends from a thunderstorm to the ground. Although tornadoes can happen at any time of the year, the most popular time for tornadoes to form in Iowa is early in the spring. Iowa is in the central plains, where the Rocky Mountains to the west and the Appalachian Mountains to the east meet. This unique geography creates a funneling effect, channeling warm, moist air from the Gulf of Mexico and cool, dry air from Canada. These are the most ideal conditions for tornadoes to form, with Iowa being caught inside of Tornado Alley, along with other Great Plains states, greatly increasing the chances of a tornado to form in Iowa.

Most active months for tornadoes in Iowa from 1980 to 2024
Date	Tornadoes
May 2004	57
April 2024	49
May 2024	49
June 1984	48
June 2008	48
April 2001	40
June 1990	36
August 2014	36
May 1998	34
June 2001	34
June 2014	31
June 2004	28

Most tornadoes in a day in Iowa from 1980 to 2024
Date	Tornadoes
August 31, 2014	35
April 11, 2001	28
June 11, 2004	24
May 8, 1988	22
June 7, 1984	21
July 19, 2018	21
May 22, 2004	20
April 9, 2011	20
November 11, 2015	19
June 1, 2001	18
March 6, 2017	18

Map of Tornado Alley

== Intense tornadoes ==
The Enhanced Fujita Scale, or EF Scale, is used to assign a tornado a rating based on estimated wind speeds and related damage. When tornado-related damage is surveyed, it is compared to a list of damage indicators and degrees of damage, which help estimate better the range of wind speeds the tornado likely produced. From that, a rating from EF0 to EF5 is assigned. From 1974 to 2007, the Fujita Scale was used to calculate the strength of a tornado. This system had calculated the strength based on the damage delt to well-built wooden homes. Tornadoes recorded before 1974 were examined and rated accordingly. Multiple flaws including a lack of damage indicators, difference in opinion from evaluators, and no calibration of damage with relation to wind speed caused researchers from Texas Tech University to re-examine and re-do the Fujita Scale. A group of wind data experts met in 2001 and came up with 28 new damage indicators which included poles, trees, and other buildings other than just wooden frame homes. After discussion, the National Weather Service officially adopted the new scale in 2007.

EF Scale
EF Rating	Wind Gust Speed (mph)
0	65-85
1	86-110
2	111-135
3	136-165
4	166-200
5	Over 200

=== Pre-1900 ===
FU	F0	F1	F2	F3	F4	F5	Total
11	0	1	67	32	27	4	142
Deaths: >540				Injuries: >2,186			

A total of 142 recorded tornadoes touched down in Iowa before 1900. At least 540 people died and 2,186 people were injured due to these tornadoes before 1900. There have been 63 intense tornadoes with a rating of F3+, the deadliest of which was on June 3, 1860, in Camanche, killing 92. This time period for tornadoes in Iowa is the deadliest period of tornadoes in Iowa, with each recorded tornado killing on average 3.48 people. The first use of a tornado warning in the United States wasn't until March 25, 1948. This caused tornadoes before the 1950s to be more dangerous, because people thought that tornadoes would be too rare to strike a region so there was no point in issuing warnings.

==== Camanche Tornado ====
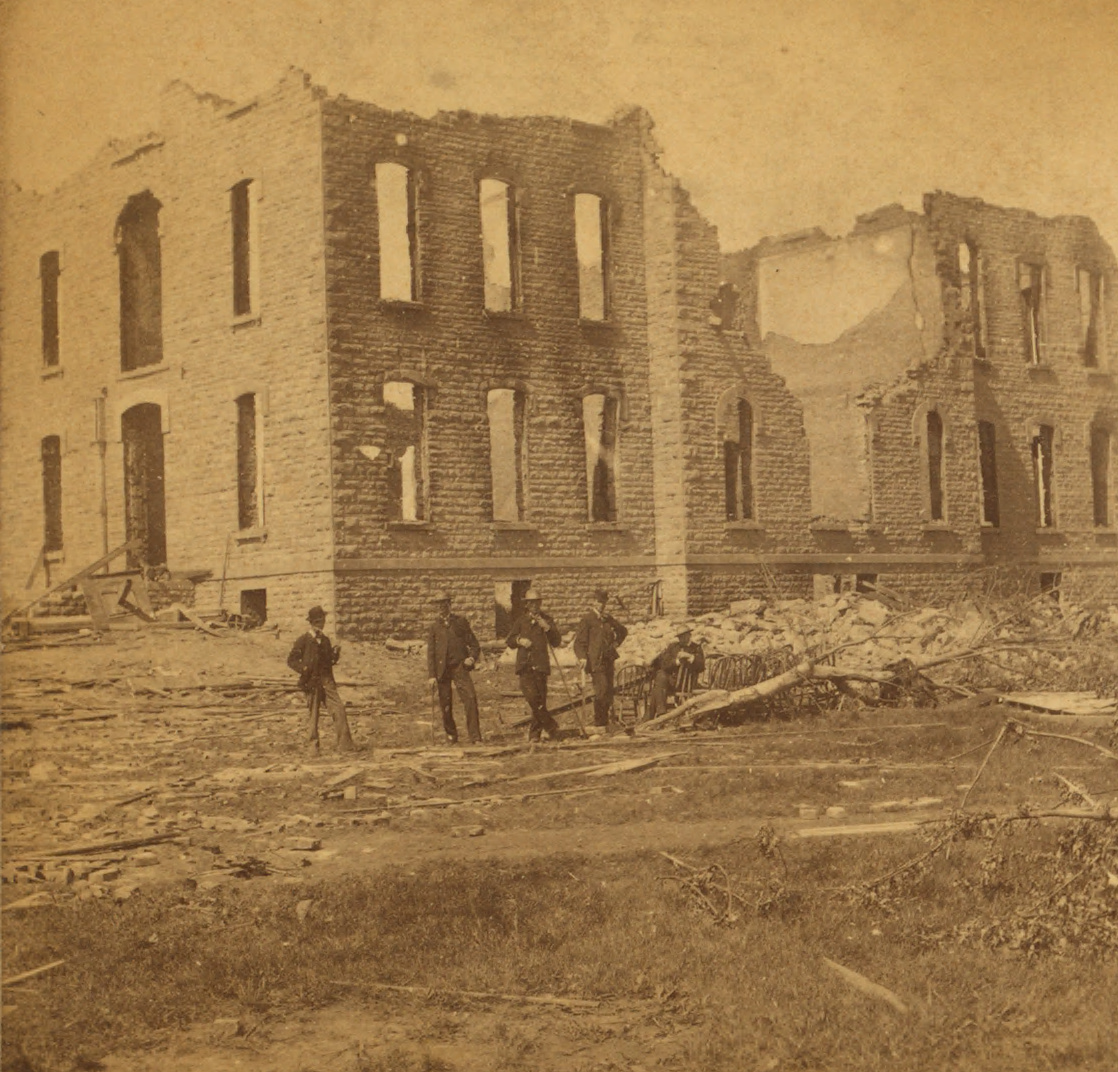
A brick college in Grinnell after the June 17, 1882, Grinnell tornado

On June 3, 1860, an F4 tornado touched down north of Bennett, moving across eastern Iowa, killing 20 people in rural Clinton County. It then ripped through Camanche, destroying almost every building in the town and killing 41. A raft carrying 26 was hit by the tornado and flipped, killing all but 3 men. The tornado caused an estimated $250,000 - $300,000 in damages.

==== Grinnell Tornado ====
On June 17, 1882, two tornadoes formed and intersected in Grinnell forming one tornado at F5 intensity. It travelled across central Iowa, killing a total of 68 people. 10 people died near Rippey, 7 people died in Jasper County, 39 in Grinnell, and 10 in Malcolm.

==== Pomeroy Tornado ====
On July 6, 1893, an F5 tornado touched down northwest of Quimby, moving toward the town of Pomeroy. With a damage path 500 yards (460 m) wide and 55 miles (89 km) long, the tornado destroyed about 80% of the homes in Pomeroy. The tornado killed 71 people and injured 200.

† Deadliest in Iowa history at time of event
‡ Tornado crossed state lines in or out of Iowa

Intense (F3+) tornadoes in Iowa, pre–1900 (Note: Grazulis classifies an intense tornado as a tornado rated F3 or higher.)
F#	Date	Deaths	Injuries	Start location	County	Path length	Max width
F4‡†	June 3, 1860	92	200	N of Bennett	Cedar	81.2 miles (mi) (130.68 kilometers (km))	1000 yards (yds) (914.4 meters (m))
F4	June 18, 1871	0	5	S of Superior	Dickinson	Unknown	Unknown
F3	June 18, 1871	2	20	Glidden	Carroll	11.6 mi (18.67 km)	Unknown
F4	May 22, 1873	8	30	S of Hayesville	Keokuk	41.7 mi (67.1 km)	800 yds (731.52 m)
F3	April 11, 1876	3	30	SE of Eagle Grove	Wright	27.5 mi (44.26 km)	Unknown
F4	April 18, 1878	1	2	W of Atlantic	Cass	Unknown	Unknown
F4	April 21, 1878	17	29	S of Charter Oak	Crawford	69.1 mi (111.21 km)	800 yds (731.52 m)
F4	April 21, 1878	10	40	SW of Battle Creek	Ida	32.5 mi (52.3 km)	200 yds (182.88 m)
F3	June 1, 1878	2	7	SW of Adair	Adair, Guthrie	12.1 mi (19.47 km)	Unknown
F3	June 1, 1878	2	7	E of Marble Rock	Floyd	Unknown	400 yds (365.76 m)
F4	June 1, 1878	3	Unknown	Rockwell	Cerro Gordo	Unknown	Unknown
F4	July 2, 1879	2	0	S of Carnes	Sioux	4.6 mi (7.4 km)	Unknown
F3	April 18, 1880	0	2	Missouri/Iowa border	Davis County	15 mi (24.14 km)	150 yds (137.16 m)
F3	April 18, 1880	0	0	Bloomfield	Davis County	8 mi (12.87 km)	200 yds (11.77 m)
F4	June 9, 1880	7	20	SW of Macedonia	Pottawattamie	15.1 mi (24.3 km)	500 yds (457.2 m)
F4	June 11, 1881	2	6	S of Norwalk	Warren	30.1 mi (48.44 km)	300 yds (274.32 m)
F3	June 11, 1881	1	8	NW of Britt	Hancock	10 mi (16.09 km)	50 yds (45.72 m)
F3	June 12, 1881	0	10	NE of Adair	Guthrie	10 mi (16.09 km)	200 yds (182.88 m)
F4	June 28, 1881	3	20	N of Quimby	Cherokee	10 mi (16.09 km)	400 yds (365.76 m)
F3	September 26, 1881	0	7	NE of Postville	Fayette, Clayton, Allamakee	6 mi (9.66 km)	200 yds (182.88 m)
F3	April 8, 1882	0	3	W of Ames	Story	12 mi (19.2 km)	100 yds (91.44 m)
F4	June 17, 1882	1	5	W of Ogden	Boone	33 mi (53.1 km)	200 yds (182.88 m)
F5	June 17, 1882	68	300	Cooper	Greene	109.4 mi (176.06 km)	800 yds (731.52 m)
F4	June 21, 1882	5	50	NW of Primghar	O'Brien	21.4 mi (34.44 km)	800 yds (731.52 m)
F3	October 30, 1882	2	6	E of Davenport	Scott	10 mi (16.09 km)	600yds (548.64 m)
F4	April 21, 1883	2	10	N of Woodbine	Harrison	10.1 mi (16.25 km)	150 yds (137.16 m)
F3	June 11, 1883	0	8	SW of Elkport	Clayton	10 mi (16.09 km)	100 yds (91.44 m)
F3	July 4, 1884	0	0	N of Hubbard	Hardin	3 mi (4.83 km)	70 yds (64 m)
F4	June 12, 1885	3	10	S of Bloomfield	Davis	10.1 mi (16.25 km)	200 yds (182.88 m)
F3	June 12, 1885	0	13	W of Fairview	Monona	14 mi (22.53 km)	300 yds (274.32 m)
F4	April 14, 1886	3	18	S of Griswold	Cass	54.5 mi (87.71 km)	400 yds (365.76 m)
F3	April 14, 1886	0	5	SW of Thurman	Fremont, Mills, Montgomery, Pottawattamie	45 mi (72.42 km)	100 yds (91.44 m)
F3	April 14, 1886	0	15	NW of Bedford	Taylor, Adams	20 mi (32.19 km)	200 yds (182.88 m)
F3	July 4, 1890	0	40	SW of Dawson	Hardin	10 mi (16.09 km)	200 yds (182.88 m)
F3‡	July 4, 1890	0	18	SW of Chester	Howard, Fillmore County, Minnesota	10 mi (16.09 km)	150 yds (137.16 m)
F3	July 4, 1890	0	2	NW of Vincent	Webster, Humboldt, Wright	5 mi (8.05 km)	200 yds (182.88 m)
F3	June 22, 1892	1	8	E of Nashua	Chickasaw, Bremer	15 mi (24.14 km)	400 yds (365.76 m)
F3‡	April 11, 1893	3	16	SW of Stanberry, Missouri	Gentry County, Missouri, Worth County, Missouri, Ringgold	35 mi (56.33 km)	300 yds (274.32 m)
F5	July 6, 1893	71	200	NW of Quimby	Cherokee, Buena Vista,Pocahontas, Calhoun	57.6 mi (92.7 km)	500 yds (457.2 m)
F4	May 5, 1894	1	5	N of Walnut City	Appanoose, Davis	32.7 mi (52.6 km)	200 yds (182.88 m)
F3	September 21, 1894	3	Unknown	S of Emmetsburg	Palo Alto	12.6 mi (20.28 km)	Unknown
F4	September 21, 1894	25	60	N of Wesley	Kossuth, Hancock, Cerro Gordo	39.6 mi (63.73 km)	1000 yds (914.4 m)
F4	September 21, 1894	5	20	Osage	Mitchell, Howard	25.3 mi (40.72 km)	Unknown
F4‡	September 21, 1894	16	70	SW of Rock Falls	Cerro Gordo, Mitchell, Mower County, Minnesota, Fillmore County, Minnesota	59.9 mi (96.4 km)	800 yds (731.52 m)
F5‡	September 21, 1894	14	100	N of Whittemore	Kossuth, Hancock, Winnebago, Faribault County, Minnesota	50.6 mi (81.43 km)	1500 yds (1371.6 m)
F3	May 3, 1895	1	1	W of Ashton	Osceola	5 mi (8.05 km)	200 yds (182.88 m)
F3	May 3, 1895	0	5	SE of St. Charles	Madison	7 mi (11.27 km)	100 yds (91.44 m)
F5	May 3, 1895	9	35	N of Ireton	Sioux	13.1 mi (21.08 km)	1000 yds (914.4 m)
F3	July 26, 1895	0	1	E of Readlyn	Bremer, Black Hawk	7 mi (11.27 km)	150 yds (137.16 m)
F4	May 24, 1896	21	60	SE of Polk City	Polk, Jasper	28.1 mi (45.22 km)	500 yds (457.2 m)
F3	September 16, 1896	0	1	N of Melrose	Monroe	5 mi (8.05 km)	400 yds (365.76 m)
F4	April 30, 1898	2	1	NW of Granville	Sioux	15 mi (24.14 km)	300 yds (274.32 m)
F3	April 30, 1898	2	Unknown	NW of Laurens	Pocahontas	7.9 mi (12.71 km)	Unknown
F3‡	April 30, 1898	1	15	SW of Newcastle, Nebraska	Dixon County, Nebraska, Union County, South Dakota, Plymouth, Sioux	60 mi (96.56 km)	200 yds (182.88 m)
F4‡	May 18, 1898	28	150	Stanwood	Cedar, Clinton, Jackson	86.7 mi (139.53 km)	1000 yds (914.4 m)
F4	July 27, 1898	2	5	NW of Hastings	Mills, Montgomery	15.2 mi (24.46 km)	150 yds (137.16 m)
F4	April 26, 1899	1	10	S of Soldier	Monona, Crawford	11 mi (17.7 km)	400 yds (365.76 m)
F4	May 16, 1899	4	14	S of Edgewood	Clayton, Delaware	10.8 mi (17.38 km)	200 yds (182.88 m)
F3	May 28, 1899	0	0	NE of Bondurant	Polk, Jasper	15 mi (24.14 km)	200 yds (182.88 m)
F3	May 30, 1899	0	0	NE of Moville	Woodbury, Plymouth	12 mi (19.31 km)	200 yds (182.88 m)
F3	May 30, 1899	1	8	N of Glenwood	Mills, Pottawattamie	8 mi (12.87 km)	100 yds (91.44 m)
F3	May 30, 1899	0	6	SE of Berea	Adair	10 mi (16.09 km)	300 yds (274.32 m)
F4‡	June 11, 1899	5	2	NE of Homer, Nebraska	Woodbury	13.1 mi (21.08 km)	200 yds (182.88 m)

=== 1900–1949 ===
FU	F0	F1	F2	F3	F4	F5	Total
0	0	1	262	41	33	1	338
Deaths: >292				Injuries: >1,861			

A total of 338 tornadoes touched down in Iowa between 1900 and 1949. At least 292 people died and 1,861 people were injured. There were 75 intense F3+ tornadoes, the deadliest of which was the 1913 Easter tornado that hit Omaha, Nebraska, making its way over the border into Iowa, killing a total of 103 people and injuring 350 others.

==== Omaha Easter Sunday Tornado ====
An F4 tornado touched down in La Vista, Nebraska, a suburb of Omaha, traveling through the city of Omaha and crossing the border into Iowa. In total, 103 people died, 9 of whom were in Iowa. The tornado had a damage path of 40.3 mi (64.86 km) long and 400 yds (365.76 m) wide.

==== Crawford County Tornado ====
On May 21, 1918, an F5 tornado touched down in Crawford County, moving across the county and into Greene County as well. According to witnesses, twenty or more farms were destroyed and a couple riding in a buggy north of Churdan were caught by the tornado and died. Mattresses were carried two miles away and farms and homes were wiped completely off their foundations.

Intense (F3+) tornadoes in Iowa, 1900-1949
F#	Date	Deaths	Injuries	Start location	County	Path length	Max width
F3	September 25, 1900	2	11	SW of Haverhill	Marshall	7.5 mi (12.07 km)	70 yds (64 m)
F3	May 1, 1902	0	5	S of Van Wert	Decatur, Clarke, Lucas	15 mi (24.14 km)	100 yds (91.44 m)
F3	May 26, 1903	2	Unknown	Des Moines	Polk	4.6 mi (7.4 km)	Unknown
F3	May 25, 1906	0	1	SW of Whiting	Monona	7 mi (11.27 km)	100 yds (91.44 m)
F3‡	June 6, 1906	0	3	NE of Burr Oak	Winneshiek, Houston County, Minnesota	15 mi (24.14 km)	100 yds (91.44 m)
F4‡	March 28, 1907	0	5	NE of Elmo, Missouri	Page, Taylor	15.5 mi (24.94 km)	400 yds (365.76 m)
F3	March 28, 1907	0	1	Caledonia	Ringgold, Decatur	25 mi (40.23 km)	Unknown
F4	August 6, 1907	3	10	W of Lake Mills	Winnebago, Worth	12.2 mi (19.63 km)	200 yds (182.88 m)
F3	April 23, 1908	0	1	W of Inwood	Lyon	10 mi (16.09 km)	100 yds (91.44 m)
F4‡	May 12, 1908	0	20	Watson, Missouri	Page	33.9 mi (54.56 km)	400 yds (365.76 m)
F3	June 7, 1908	1	10	SW of Charles City	Floyd	11 mi (17.70 km)	100 yds (91.44 m)
F3	April 13, 1912	0	2	S of Moingona	Boone	8 mi (12.87 km)	50 yds (45.72 m)
F4‡	March 23, 1913	25	75	Bellevue, Nebraska	Pottawattamie, Harrison, Shelby, Sarpy County, Nebraska	48.4 mi (77.89 km)	400 yds (365.76 m)
F4‡†	March 23, 1913	103	350	La Vista, Nebraska	Pottawattamie, Harrison, Shelby, Sarpy County, Nebraska, Douglas County, Nebraska	40.3 mi (64.86 km)	400 yds (365.76 m)
F4‡	March 23, 1913	22	50	SE of Mead, Nebraska	Harrison, Saunders County, Nebraska, Douglas County, Nebraska, Washington County, Nebraska	56.6 mi (91.09 km)	800 yds (731.52 m)
F4‡	March 23, 1913	18	100	S of Douglas, Nebraska	Mills, Pottawattamie, Otoe County, Nebraska, Cass County, Nebraska	67.7 mi (108.95 km)	800 yds (731.52 m)
F3‡	March 23, 1913	0	13	W of Craig, Nebraska	Monona, Burt County, Nebraska	15 mi (24.14 km)	200 yds (182.88 m)
F3	June 5, 1914	3	20	E of Archer	O'Brien	11.1 mi (17.86 km)	200 yds (182.88 m)
F4	June 12, 1915	0	1	S of West Union	Fayette, Clayton	13.5 mi (21.73 km)	100 yds (91.44 m)
F4‡	June 12, 1915	9	50	S of Elon	Allamakee, Crawford County, Wisconsin	30.4 mi (48.92 km)	400 yds (365.76 m)
F3	September 26, 1916	0	0	NE of Blanchard	Page, Taylor	23 mi (37.01 km)	Unknown
F4	May 9, 1918	7	15	SW of Nashua	Chickasaw, Floyd	50 mi (80.47 km)	800 yds (731.52 m)
F3	May 21, 1918	2	15	S of Glidden	Carroll	31.9 mi (51.34 km)	500 yds (457.2 m)
F4‡	May 21, 1918	9	70	N of Berkley	Boone	29.5 mi (47.48 km)	1600 yds (1463.04 m)
F4	May 21, 1918	8	100	N of Wood	Clayton	80.1 mi (128.9 km)	400 yds (365.76 m)
F5	May 21, 1918	4	30	E of Denison	Crawford	42 mi (67.59 km)	800 yds (731.52 m)
F4	July 1, 1920	0	4	SW of Carbon	Adams	19.8 mi (31.87 km)	500 yds (457.2 m)
F4	June 2, 1925	3	5	NW of Anita	Cass	13.8 mi (22.2 km)	250 yds (228.6 m)
F4	June 2, 1925	0	3	W of Ticonic	Monona	27.6 mi (44.42 km)	400 yds (365.76 m)
F3	June 2, 1925	0	5	NW of Red Oak	Montgomery	12 mi (19.31 km)	300 yds (274.32 m)
F4	June 3, 1925	1	20	N of Neola	Pottawattamie	9.7 mi (15.61 km)	1500 yds (1371.6 m)
F4	June 3, 1925	0	10	N of Neola	Pottawattamie	6.9 mi (11.1 km)	Unknown
F3	June 3, 1925	0	1	SW of Jefferson	Greene, Webster	Unknown	Unknown
F3	July 11, 1925	1	18	SW of Alexander	Wright, Franklin	15 mi (24.14 km)	60 yds (54.86 m)
F4	June 16, 1926	2	24	SW of Clarinda	Page	7.9 mi (12.71 km)	200 yds (182.88 m)
F3	June 16, 1926	0	5	W of Redding	Taylor, Ringgold	7 mi (11.27 km)	400 yds (365.76 m)
F3	May 23, 1927	0	2	NW of Williamsburg	Iowa County, Iowa	6 mi (9.66 km)	200 yds (182.88 m)
F3	June 18, 1928	0	0	SE of Prescott	Adams, Union	15 mi (24.14 km)	400 yds (365.76 m)
F3	August 20, 1928	2	20	W of Twin Lakes	Calhoun	6.2 mi (9.98 km)	400 yds (365.76 m)
F3	August 20, 1928	0	3	S of Radcliffe	Hardin	35 mi (56.33 km)	800 yds (731.52 m)
F4	August 20, 1928	1	8	SW of Jewell	Hamilton	10.8 mi (17.38 km)	400 yds (365.76 m)
F4‡	August 20, 1928	6	60	SW of Vinje	Winnebago, Freeborn County, Minnesota, Mower County, Minnesota	40.3 mi (64.86 km)	Unknown
F3	August 26, 1928	4	20	Red Oak	Montgomery, Cass	15 mi (21.14 km)	100 yds (91.44 m)
F4	September 13, 1928	5	52	SW of Pender, Nebraska	Cuming County, Nebraska, Thurston County, Nebraska, Dakota County, Nebraska, Woodbury	33 mi (53.11 km)	800 yds (731.52 m)
F3	November 14, 1928	1	9	S of Vinton	Benton, Linn, Buchanan, Delaware	45 mi (72.42 km)	200 yds (182.88 m)
F3	April 5, 1929	0	4	W of Ellington	Hancock	2 mi (3.22 km)	Unknown
F4	May 1, 1930	1	15	E of Millerton	Wayne	17.2 mi (27.68 km)	100 yds (91.44 m)
F4‡	May 1, 1930	4	40	W of Craig, Nebraska	Harrison	15.5 mi (24.94 km)	600 yds (548.64 m)
F3	May 1, 1930	0	7	E of Clio	Wayne	18 mi (28.97 km)	400 yds (365.76 m)
F4	September 21, 1931	2	8	NW of Birmingham	Van Buren	45.9 mi (73.87 km)	100 yds (91.44 m)
F3	July 14, 1935	0	0	W of Sumner	Bremer, Fayette	10 mi (16.09 km)	50 yds (45.72 m)
F4	April 30, 1936	2	15	NE of Hartley	O'Brien	14.8 mi (23.82 km)	100 yds (91.44 m)
F4‡	April 30, 1936	2	61	Estherville	Emmet	40.2 mi (64.7 km)	800 yds (731.52 m)
F3	May 26, 1937	1	8	N of Mingo	Jasper, Marshall	20 mi (32.19 km)	400 yds (365.76 m)
F3	May 18, 1938	0	0	NE of Bernard	Dubuque, Jackson	15 mi (24.14 km)	100 yds (91.44 m)
F3	August 10, 1939	0	4	W of Liberty Center	Warren	12 mi (19.31 km)	400 yds (365.76 m)
F3	September 7, 1941	0	6	Prairie City	Jasper, Poweshiek	30 mi (48.28 km)	600 yds (548.64 m)
F3‡	May 30, 1942	0	0	W of Lake Park	Dickinson, Jackson County, Minnesota	20 mi (32.19 km)	600 yds (548.64 m)
F3‡	May 18, 1944	0	1	SW of Tekamah, Nebraska	Burt County, Nebraska, Monona	30 mi (48.28 km)	300 yds (274.32 m)
F3	May 18, 1944	2	12	White Oak	Polk, Story	14.9 mi (23.98 km)	880 yds (804.67 m)
F3	May 18, 1944	0	0	W of Deloit	Crawford, Sac	18 mi (28.97 km)	800yds (731.52 m)
F3	May 18, 1944	0	0	SW of Paton	Greene	5 mi (8.05 km)	200 yds (182.88 m)
F4	May 19, 1944	1	9	W of Fort Dodge	Webster	6.2 mi (9.98 km)	400 yds (365.76 m)
F3	May 19, 1944	0	0	S of Albert City	Buena Vista, Pocahontas	12 mi (19.31 km)	200 yds (182.88 m)
F3	June 11, 1944	0	0	N of Glenwood	Mills	2 mi (3.22 km)	100 yds (91.44 m)
F4	June 16, 1944	0	1	Lebanon	Sioux	8.1 mi (13.04 km)	Unknown
F4	June 16, 1944	0	2	Newkirk	Sioux	10 mi (16.09 km)	Unknown
F3	June 16, 1944	0	0	W of Sioux Center	Sioux	5 mi (8.05 km)	Unknown
F3	May 21, 1945	0	1	SW of Stanton	Montgomery	9 mi (14.48 km)	Unknown
F3‡	April 29, 1947	0	1	S of Hatfield, Missouri	Decatur, Wayne, Harrison County, Missouri, Mercer County, Missouri	40 mi (64.37 km)	200 yds (182.88 m)
F4‡	June 9, 1947	1	2	SE of Elk Point, South Dakota	Sioux, Union County, South Dakota, Dixon County, Nebraska	34.8 mi (56 km)	200 yds (182.88 m)
F4	April 23, 1948	5	25	S of Chickasaw	Chickasaw	7.8 mi (12.55 km)	100 yds (91.44 m)
F4‡	June 22, 1948	1	5	S of Cook, Nebraska	Fremont, Mills, Johnson County, Nebraska, Otoe County, Nebraska	51 mi (82.08 km)	300 yds (274.32 m)
F3‡	June 1, 1949	0	0	SW of Paul, Nebraska	Fremont, Otoe County, Nebraska	12 mi (19.31 km)	100 yds (91.44 m)
F4	June 1, 1949	0	4	E of Shenandoah	Page,Fremont	9.8 mi (15.77 km)	150 yds (137.16 m)

=== 1950–present ===
FU	F0	F1	F2	F3	F4	F5	Total
127	1,318	971	499	78	43	6	3,042
Deaths: >101				Injuries: >2,400			

A total of 3,118 recorded tornadoes have touched down in Iowa since 1950, causing 101 deaths and injuring 2,400 as of July 2025. There have been 20 (E)F5 tornadoes, or 2 or more fatalities, the deadliest being the 1968 Hansell-Charles City tornado, which killed 13 and injured 462.

==== 1968 Hansell-Charles City tornado ====
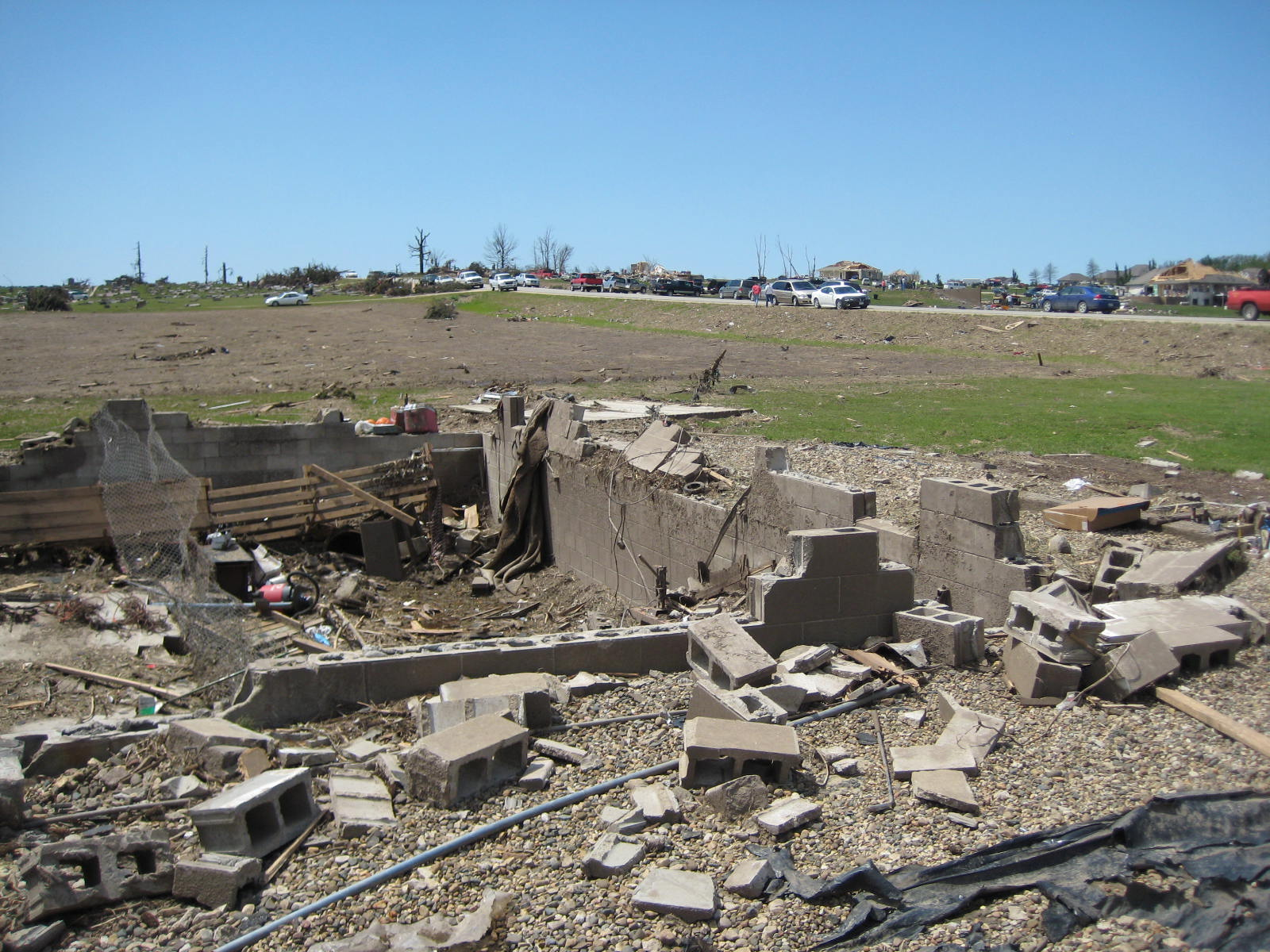
A house completely swept off its foundation in Parkersburg after the 2008 Parkersburg-New Hartford tornado.

On May 15, 1968, a multi-vortex tornado hit the communities of Hansell, Hampton, Charles City, Elma, and Aredale, all in Iowa. It killed 13, injured 462, and hundreds of buildings were destroyed, primarily in the town of Charles City. Damage estimates were of more than $20 million. All of the deaths occurred in Charles City.

==== 2008 Parkersburg-New Hartford tornado ====
On the afternoon of May 25, 2008, as part of a large tornado outbreak across the central plains, a large and extremely powerful EF5 wedge tornado devastated the towns of Parkersburg and New Hartford. The tornado killed nine people and caused about $75 million in damages in its approximately 43 mile path across northeast Iowa. The tornado killed 7 in Parkersburg and 2 in New Hartford.

==== 2024 Greenfield tornado ====
On the afternoon of May 21, 2024, a violent tornado tracked across southwestern Iowa, devastating the city of Greenfield. The tornado destroyed many structures and wind turbines across its path that stretched through Page, Taylor, Adams, and Adair counties, while also causing more than $31 million in property damage, killing five people and injuring 35 more. All of the fatalities happened in the town of Greenfield. A Doppler on Wheels estimated wind speeds of 309–318 mph (497–512 km/h), the third highest wind estimate from inside a tornado in the United States, before the 2013 El Reno tornado and the Bridge Creek tornado.

Intense (F3+) tornadoes in Iowa, 1950–present
F#	Date	Deaths	Injuries	Start location	County	Path length	Max width
F4	May 10, 1953	0	0	NW of Millerton	Wayne, Lucas	8 mi (12.87 km)	200 yds (182.88 m)
F4	May 10, 1953	0	3	SE of Garner	Hancock, Cerro Gordo, Worth	28 mi (45.06 km)	800 yds (731.52 m)
F3‡	May 10, 1953	1	5	SW of Chester	Howard, Fillmore County, Minnesota, Olmsted County, Minnesota	110 mi (177.03 km)	400 yds (365.76 m)
F5	June 27, 1953	1	2	W of Anita	Cass, Adair	0.1 mi (0.16 km)	100 yds (91.44 m)
F3	April 5, 1954	0	1	E of Scranton	Greene	7 mi (11.27 km)	800 yds (731.52 m)
F3‡	April 5, 1954	0	2	NW of Westboro, Missouri	Atchison County, Missouri, Page	8 mi (12.87 km)	500 yds (457.2 m)
F4‡	April 5, 1954	0	0	Elmo, Missouri	Nodaway County, Missouri, Page, Taylor	25 mi (40.23 km)	900 yds (822.96 m)
F4	April 30, 1954	0	0	NE of Cedar Rapids	Linn, Delaware	20 mi (32.19 km)	200 yds (182.88 m)
F4	June 9, 1954	1	0	NE of Lake City	Calhoun	12 mi (19.3121 km)	400 yds (365.76 m)
F3	April 23, 1955	0	0	Benton	Ringgold	5 mi (8.05 km)	400 yds (365.76 m)
F3	July 14, 1958	0	1	NE of Prescott	Adams	13 mi (20.92 km)	100 yds (91.44 m)
F4	May 10, 1959	0	1	SW of Guthrie Center	Guthrie, Dallas, Boone	40 mi (64.37 km)	400 yds (365.76 m)
F4	May 20, 1959	0	5	SW of Promise City	Wayne, Lucas	15 mi (24.14 km)	400 yds (365.76 m)
F3	May 7, 1962	0	0	NW of Marysville	Scott	2 mi (3.22 km)	300 yds (274.32 m)
F4	April 12, 1964	1	28	NE of Coin	Page	15 mi (24.14 km)	400 yds (365.76 m)
F3	April 20, 1964	0	1	Atlantic	Cass	8 mi (12.87 km)	350 yds (320.04 m)
F3	May 7, 1964	0	1	Waterloo	Black Hawk	3 mi (4.83 km)	200 yds (182.88 m)
F3	June 19, 1964	0	2	S of Shenandoah	Page	9 mi (14.48 km)	250 yds (228.6 m)
F3	June 22, 1964	0	0	NE of Sidney	Fremont	7 mi (11.27 km)	400 yds (365.76 m)
F4	June 22, 1964	0	0	Hopeville	Clarke	30 mi (48.28 km)	400 yds (365.76 m)
F4	August 29, 1964	0	2	Galbraith	Kossuth	15 mi (24.14 km)	100 yds (91.44 m)
F4	April 11, 1965	1	3	E of Tipton	Cedar, Clinton, Jackson	40 mi (64.37 km)	300 yds (274.32 m)
F4	May 5, 1965	0	0	SW of Farnhamville	Calhoun, Webster	8 mi (12.88 km)	200 yds (182.88 m)
F4‡	May 5, 1965	0	17	N of Nora Springs	Floyd, Mitchell, Howard, Winneshiek, Fillmore County, Minnesota, Houston County, Minnesota	65 mi (104.61 km)	150 yds (137.16 m)
F4	August 26, 1965	1	17	S of La Porte City	Benton	14 mi (22.53 km)	200 yds (182.88 m)
F3	September 20, 1965	0	4	Sigourney	Keokuk	1 mi (1.61 km)	100 yds (91.44 m)
F3	April 19, 1966	0	4	SE of Gilman	Poweshiek, Tama, Benton	30 mi (48.28 km)	400 yds (365.76 m)
F5 (Note: Grazulis rated this tornado an F4, but other sources, including the National Weather Service have rated this tornado an F5)	October 14, 1966	6	172	SW of Belmond	Wright	9.7 mi (15.61 km)	1000 yds (914.4 m)
F4‡	January 24, 1967	0	2	E of Queen City	Davis, Schuyler County, Missouri, Scotland County, Missouri	20 mi (32.19 km)	400 yds (365.76 m)
F3	January 24, 1967	1	6	SW of Fort Madison	Lee	10 mi (16.09 km)	300 yds (274.32 m)
F3‡	April 30, 1967	0	0	"Just S of the Iowa border"	Worth, Freeborn County, Minnesota	6 mi (9.66 km)	400 yds (365.76 m)
F4‡	April 30, 1967	0	1	SE of Manly	Worth, Freeborn County, Minnesota	18 mi (28.97 km)	400 yds (365.76 m)
F4	June 8, 1967	0	5	SW of Moorland	Webster	10 mi (16.09 km)	100 yds (91.44 m)
F5	May 15, 1968	13	462	NW of Hansell	Franklin, Butler, Chickasaw, Floyd, Howard	62.1 mi (99.94 km)	600 yds (548.64 m)
F5	May 15, 1968	5	156	Oelwein	Fayette	13.1 mi (21.08 km)	500 yds (457.2 m)
F3	June 13, 1968	0	17	Arnolds Park	Dickinson	12 mi (19.31 km)	200 yds (182.88 m)
F3	May 5, 1971	0	12	Conway	Taylor	2 mi (3.22 km)	400 yds (365.76 m)
F3	July 12, 1971	0	0	SE of Grafton	Worth, Mitchell	18 mi (28.97 km)	300 yds (274.32 m)
F4	July 12, 1971	0	0	W of Elma	Howard, Fayette, Chickasaw	30 mi (48.28 km)	400 yds (365.76 m)
F4	June 18, 1974	2	50	Ankeny	Polk	15.3 mi (24.62 km)	400 yds (365.76 m)
F3	June 20, 1974	1	20	Andover	Clinton	12 mi (19.31 km)	200 yds (182.88 m)
F4	August 12, 1974	0	12	SW of Ryan	Delaware	7 mi (11.27 km)	400 yds (365.76 m)
F4	August 12, 1974	0	2	Ladora	Iowa	2 mi (3.22 km)	100 yds (91.44 m)
F3	June 13, 1976	0	0	S of Perry	Dallas, Boone	22 mi (35.41 km)	100 yds (91.44 m)
F3	June 13, 1976	0	0	E of Boone	Story	5 mi (8.05 km)	300 yds (274.32 m)
F5	June 13, 1976	0	9	SW of Luther	Boone, Story	21.3 mi (34.28 km)	880 yds (804.67 m)
F4	June 26, 1976	0	15	SW of Minden	Pottawattamie	6 mi (9.66 km)	200 yds (182.88 m)
F3	May 4, 1977	0	0	S of Houghton	Lee	2 mi (3.22 km)	60 yds (54.86 m)
F4	May 4, 1977	0	14	NE of Fort Dodge	Webster	2 mi (3.22 km)	70 yds (64.01 m)
F3	September 16, 1978	6	45	N of Rhodes	Marshall, Jasper, Poweshiek	31.8 mi (51.18 km)	200 yds (182.88 m)
F4‡	March 29, 1979	0	20	W of Burlington Junction, Missouri	Page, Nodaway County, Missouri	18 mi (28.97 km)	500 yds (457.2 m)
F3	March 29, 1979	0	1	"State Border, W of Highway 148"	Taylor	28 mi (45.06 km)	500 yds (457.2 m)
F3	March 29, 1979	0	4	NW of Shannon City	Union, Warren, Madison	51 mi (82.08 km)	500 yds (457.2 m)
F3	May 8, 1979	0	4	NW of Bronson	Woodbury	Unknown	30 yds (27.43 m)
F3	June 28, 1979	2	34	SW of Bancroft	Kossuth	15.9 mi (25.59 km)	300 yds (274.32 m)
F3	June 28, 1979	0	0	E of Luverne	Kossuth, Humboldt, Wright	24 mi (38.62 km)	300 yds (274.32 m)
F4	June 28, 1979	3	26	Palmer	Pocahontas, Calhoun	14.9 mi (23.98 km)	33 yds (30.18 m)
F4‡	August 28, 1979	2	14	NE of Bartlett	Fremont, Mills, Page	38.3 mi (61.64 km)	533 yds (487.38 m)
F4	June 2, 1980	0	0	Lamoni	Decatur, Wayne	32 mi (51.50 km)	150 yds (137.16 m)
F3	September 20, 1980	0	0	Spencer	Clay	1.5 mi (2.41 km)	300 yds (274.32 m)
F3	June 7, 1984	0	3	Clarinda	Page, Taylor, Adams	25 mi (40.23 km)	100 yds (91.44 m)
F3	June 7, 1984	0	5	Burt	Kossuth	9 mi (14.48 km)	150 yds (137.16 m)
F3‡	June 7, 1984	1	10	S of Eagleville, Missouri	Decatur, Wayne, Lucas, Harrison County, Missouri	50 mi (80.47 km)	250 yds (228.6 m)
F4	June 7, 1984	2	51	NE of Eddyville	Mahaska, Keokuk	30 mi (48.28 km)	250 yds (228.6 m)
F3	May 30, 1985	2	27	N of Volga	Clayton	34 mi (54.72 km)	1500 yds (1371.6 m)
F3‡	April 26, 1986	1	4	N of George	Lyon, Nobles County, Minnesota	9 mi (14.48 km)	120 yds (109.73 m)
F3‡	July 28, 1986	0	1	Maskell, Nebraska	Woodbury, Monona, Dixon County, Nebraska, Dakota County, Nebraska	40 mi (64.37 km)	75 yds (68.58 m)
F4	September 28, 1986	0	0	SW of Farrar	Polk, Jasper	20 mi (32.19 km)	250 yds (228.6 m)
F3	July 15, 1988	0	34	Council Bluffs	Pottawattamie	3 mi (4.83 km)	70 yds (64.01 m)
F3	May 24, 1989	0	0	E of Corning	Adams, Union, Ringgold, Decatur	50 mi (80.47 km)	300 yds (274.32 m)
F4	May 24, 1989	0	3	SE of Stratford	Story, Marshall, Tama	66 mi (106.22 km)	150 yds (137.16 m)
F4	May 30, 1989	0	3	New Providence	Hardin, Grundy	11 mi (17.70 km)	200 yds (182.88 m)
F3	March 22, 1991	0	0	E of Huxley	Story, Hardin	43 mi (69.20 km)	70 yds (64.01 m)
F3	April 26, 1991	0	0	Denison	Crawford, Sac	7.7 mi (12.39 km)	150 yds (137.16 m)
F3	June 16, 1992	0	0	Logan	Harrison, Crawford	26 mi (41.84 km)	200 yds (182.88 m)
F3	July 13, 1992	0	0	E of Langworthy	Jones	5 mi (8.05 km)	73 yds (66.75 m)
F3	April 14, 1994	0	0	NW of Bridgwater	Adair	14 mi (22.53 km)	130 yds (118.87 m)
F3	June 18, 1994	0	0	Hancock County	Hancock	6 mi (9.66 km)	175 yds (160.02 m)
F3	July 5, 1994	0	0	N of Salix	Woodbury	1.8 mi (2.90 km)	150 yds (137.16 m)
F3	July 19, 1994	0	0	Howard County	Howard, Winneshiek	23 mi (40.23 km)	150 yds (137.16 m)
F3	August 7, 1994	0	1	N of Sibley	Osceola	4.5 mi (7.24 km)	75 yds (68.58 m)
F3	May 9, 1995	0	0	NW of Blue Grass	Muscatine	7 mi (11.27 km)	500 yds (457.2 m)
F4	May 27, 1995	0	0	Carroll	Carroll, Sac, Calhoun, Pocahontas	37 mi (59.55 km)	400 yds (365.76 m)
F4	May 27, 1995	0	2	W of Creston	Union, Adair, Guthrie, Dallas	55 mi (88.51 km)	500 yds (457.2 m)
F4	May 27, 1995	0	1	S of Coon Rapids	Guthrie, Greene, Carroll	30 mi (48.28 km)	250 yds (228.6 m)
F3	May 27, 1995	0	0	SW of Lamoni	Decatur, Clarke	30.5 mi (49.08 km)	150 yds (137.16 m)
F3	July 27, 1995	0	0	W of Lamont	Buchanan, Delaware	20.5 mi (32.99 km)	150 yds (137.16 m)
F3	May 15, 1998	0	47	W of Washington	Washington, Johnson, Cedar	47 mi (75.64 km)	400 yds (365.76 m)
F4	April 8, 1999	0	3	S of Nodaway	Taylor, Adams, Cass, Adair	36 mi (57.93 km)	1500 yds (1371.6 m)
F4	April 8, 1999	0	1	SE of Creston	Union, Madison, Dallas	31.5 mi (50.69 km)	1500 yds (1371.6 m)
F3	April 8, 1999	0	0	NW of Lucas	Lucas	4.5 mi (7.24 km)	120 yds (109.73 m)
F3	April 8, 1999	0	0	Bloomfield	Davis	11 mi (17.70 km)	400 yds (365.76 m)
F3	May 16, 1999	2	16	N of Missouri Valley	Harrison	7.5 mi (12.07 km)	440 yds (404.34 m)
F3	May 16, 1999	0	0	N of Missouri Valley	Harrison	6.2 mi (9.98 km)	200 yds (182.88 m)
F3	May 11, 2000	1	25	Cedar Falls	Black Hawk	18.5 mi (29.77 km)	400 yds (365.76 m)
F3	April 11, 2001	0	0	La Porte City	Black Hawk	23.5 mi (37.82 km)	500 yds (457.2 m)
F3	May 21, 2004	0	0	Palo	Linn	3 mi (4.83 km)	200 yds (182.88 m)
F3	June 11, 2004	0	0	SW of Webb	Clay	6 mi (9.66 km)	400 yds (365.76 m)
F3‡	June 11, 2004	0	0	N of Riceville	Howard, Mower County, Minnesota	8 mi (12.87 km)	150 yds (137.16 m)
F3	November 12, 2005	1	3	N of Steamboat Rock	Hardin	5.8 mi (9.33 km)	150 yds (137.16 m)
EF3	June 1, 2007	0	7	Grandview	Louisa, Muscatine	15.75 mi (25.35 km)	774 yds (707.75 m)
EF5	May 25, 2008	9	70	S of Aplington	Butler	41 mi (65.98 km)	2100 yds (1920.24 m)
EF3	May 25, 2008	0	3	S of Fairbank	Buchanan	20.92 mi (33.67 km)	1232 yds (1126.54 m)
EF3‡	June 11, 2008	4	48	E of Tekamah, Nebraska	Monona, Harrison, Burt County, Nebraska	14.2 mi (22.85 km)	440 yds (404.34 m)
EF4	June 25, 2010	0	13	S of Little Rock	Lyon, Osceola	8.47 mi (13.63 km)	800 yds (731.52 m)
EF4	April 9, 2011	0	0	N of Varina	Pocahontas	3.2 mi (5.15 km)	587 yds (536.75 m)
EF3	April 9, 2011	0	14	SW of Mapleton	Monona	3.38 mi (5.44 km)	1200 yds (1097.28 m)
EF3	April 9, 2011	0	0	NE of Arthur	Sac	10.14 mi (16.32 km)	1760 yds (1609.34 m)
EF3	April 9, 2011	0	0	W of Nemaha	Sac, Buena Vista, Pocahontas	17.17 mi (27.63 km)	2640 yds (2414.02 m)
EF3	June 12, 2013	0	0	NW of Belmond	Wright	6.2 mi (9.98 km)	200 yds (182.88 m)
EF4	October 4, 2013	0	0	SW of Climbing Hill	Woodbury, Cherokee	24.7 mi (39.75 km)	2600 yds (2377.44 m)
EF3	June 22, 2015	0	0	SE of Columbia	Marion, Lucas, Monroe	11.6 mi (18.67 km)	575 yds (525.78 m)
EF3	July 19, 2018	0	13	N of Pella	Marion, Mahaska	9.17 mi (14.76 km)	800 yds (731.52 m)
EF3	July 19, 2018	0	22	W of Marietta	Marshall	8.41 mi (13.53 km)	1200 yds (1097.28 m)
EF3	May 27, 2019	0	0	NE of Cantril	Van Buren	7.5 mi (12.07 km)	100 yds (91.44 m)
EF3	August 20, 2019	0	0	NW of Liberty Center	Warren	5.49 mi (8.84 km)	710 yds (649.22 m)
EF3	July 14, 2021	0	0	SW of Lake City	Calhoun	10.81 mi (17.4 km)	505 yds (461.77 m)
EF4	March 5, 2022	6	5	NW of Macksburg	Madison, Warren, Polk, Jasper	70.57 mi (113.57 km)	900 yds (822.96 m)
EF3	March 5, 2022	1	1	NE of Derby	Lucas	11.28 mi (18.15 km)	350 yds (320.04 m)
EF4	March 31, 2023	0	3	SE of Harper	Keokuk, Washington, Johnson, Iowa	19.9 mi (32.03 km)	700 yds (640.08 m)
EF3	March 31, 2023	0	0	NE of Ottumwa	Wapello, Keokuk	26.1 mi (42 km)	1000 yds (914.4 m)
EF4‡	April 26, 2024	0	4	SW of Waterloo, Nebraska	Harrison, Douglas County, Nebraska, Washington County, Nebraska	31.89 mi (51.32 km)	1900 yds (1737.36 m)
EF3‡	April 26, 2024	0	0	SW of Council Bluffs	Pottawattamie, Harrison, Douglas County, Nebraska	19.06 mi (30.67 km)	550 yds (502.92 m)
EF3	April 26, 2024	0	0	E of Dumfries	Pottawattamie	13.31 mi (21.42 km)	900 yds (822.96 m)
EF3	April 26, 2024	1	3	SE of McClelland	Pottawattamie, Harrison, Shelby	40.27 mi (64.81 km)	1900 yds (1737.36 m)
EF4	May 21, 2024	5	35	S of Villisca	Montgomery, Page, Taylor, Adams, Adair	44 mi (70.81 km)	1000 yds (914.4 m)
EF3	May 21, 2024	0	0	S of Nyman	Page, Montgomery, Adams	33.86 mi (54.49 km)	1300 yds (1188.72 m)
