= Hanlontown, Iowa =

- City
- Location of Hanlontown, Iowa
- Coordinates: 43°16′51″N 93°22′32″W
- Country: USA
- State: Iowa
- County: Worth
- Founded: October 9, 1899
- Incorporated: January 18, 1902

Area
  - Total: 0.97 sq mi (2.51 km^{2})
  - Land: 0.97 sq mi (2.51 km^{2})
  - Water: 0 sq mi (0.00 km^{2})
- Elevation: 1,207 ft (368 m)

Population (2020)
  - Total: 206
  - Density: 212.5/sq mi (82.05/km^{2})
- Time zone: UTC-6 (Central (CST))
  - Summer (DST): UTC-5 (CDT)
- ZIP code: 50444
- Area code: 641
- FIPS code: 19-34185
- GNIS feature ID: 2394286
- Website: hanlontown.org

Hanlontown is a city in Worth County, Iowa, United States. The population was 206 at the time of the 2020 census. It is part of the Mason City Micropolitan Statistical Area.

== History ==
Hanlontown was founded on October 9, 1899, when a portion of the Chicago and North Western Railroad was built in the southwestern part of Worth County. It was named for the property owner, James Hanlon, and was incorporated on January 18, 1902.

== Geography ==
According to the United States Census Bureau, the city has a total area of 0.97 square miles (2.51 km^{2}), all land.

== Demographics ==
Historical populations
Year	Pop.	±%
1910	129	—
1920	202	+56.6%
1930	190	−5.9%
1940	260	+36.8%
1950	257	−1.2%
1960	193	−24.9%
1970	182	−5.7%
1980	213	+17.0%
1990	193	−9.4%
2000	229	+18.7%
2010	226	−1.3%
2020	206	−8.8%
Source:"U.S. Census website". United States Census Bureau. and Iowa Data Center; Source: U.S. Decennial Census

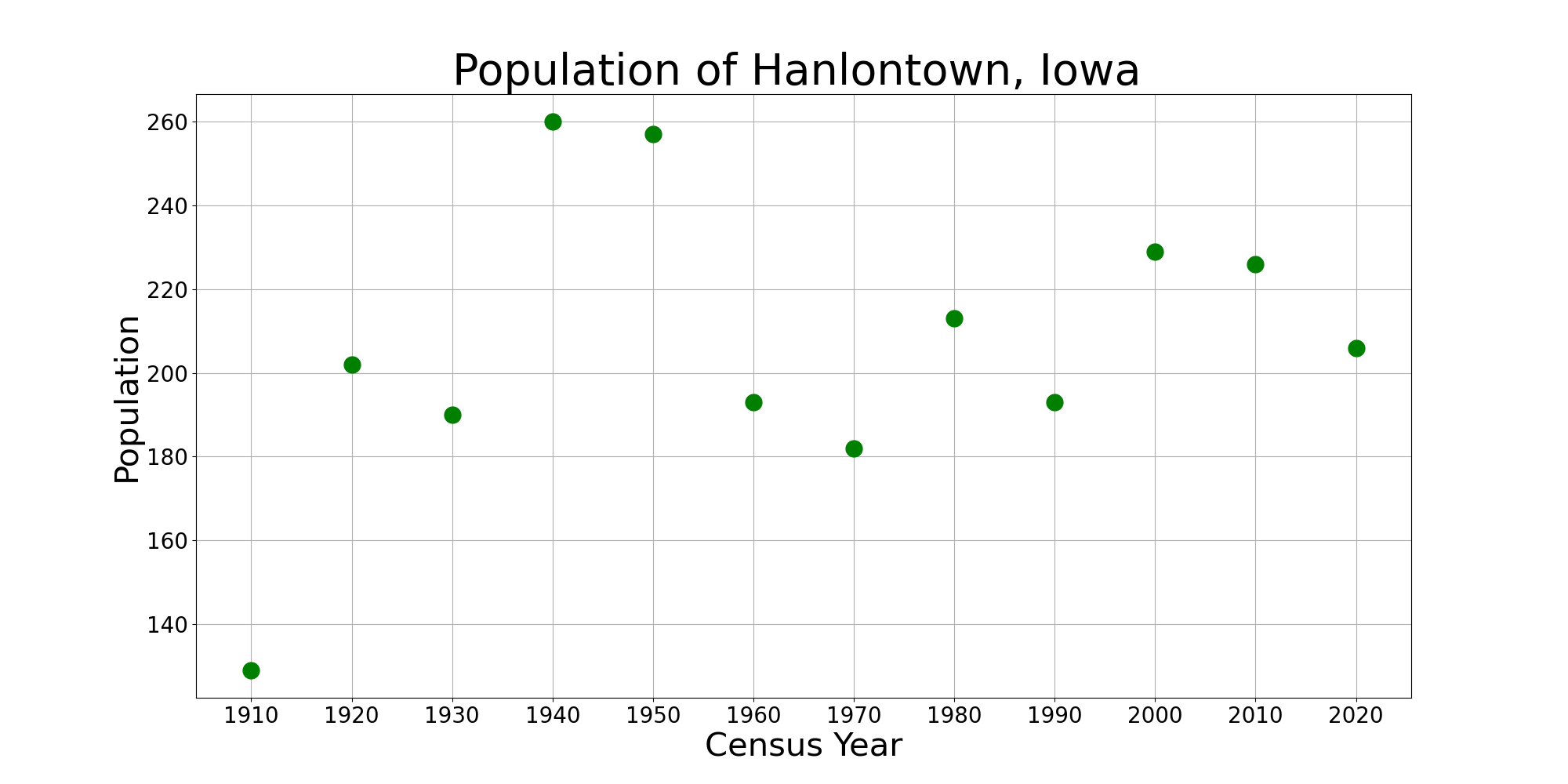
The population of Hanlontown, Iowa from US census data

=== 2020 census ===
As of the census of 2020, there were 206 people, 84 households, and 56 families residing in the city. The population density was 212.5 inhabitants per square mile (82.0/km^{2}). There were 92 housing units at an average density of 94.9 per square mile (36.6/km^{2}). The racial makeup of the city was 87.9% White, 0.5% Black or African American, 0.0% Native American, 1.9% Asian, 0.0% Pacific Islander, 1.9% from other races and 7.8% from two or more races. Hispanic or Latino persons of any race comprised 4.9% of the population.

Of the 84 households, 26.2% of which had children under the age of 18 living with them, 52.4% were married couples living together, 9.5% were cohabitating couples, 22.6% had a female householder with no spouse or partner present and 15.5% had a male householder with no spouse or partner present. 33.3% of all households were non-families. 23.8% of all households were made up of individuals, 7.1% had someone living alone who was 65 years old or older.

The median age in the city was 36.3 years. 24.3% of the residents were under the age of 20; 10.2% were between the ages of 20 and 24; 22.8% were from 25 and 44; 26.2% were from 45 and 64; and 16.5% were 65 years of age or older. The gender makeup of the city was 45.6% male and 54.4% female.

=== 2010 census ===
As of the census of 2010, there were 226 people, 90 households, and 58 families residing in the city. The population density was 233.0 inhabitants per square mile (90.0/km^{2}). There were 96 housing units at an average density of 99.0 per square mile (38.2/km^{2}). The racial makeup of the city was 97.3% White, 0.9% African American, 0.4% Asian, 0.4% from other races, and 0.9% from two or more races. Hispanic or Latino of any race were 4.9% of the population.

There were 90 households, of which 37.8% had children under the age of 18 living with them, 54.4% were married couples living together, 5.6% had a female householder with no husband present, 4.4% had a male householder with no wife present, and 35.6% were non-families. 28.9% of all households were made up of individuals, and 8.9% had someone living alone who was 65 years of age or older. The average household size was 2.51 and the average family size was 3.17.

The median age in the city was 36.7 years. 27.4% of residents were under the age of 18; 6.2% were between the ages of 18 and 24; 26.1% were from 25 to 44; 31% were from 45 to 64; and 9.3% were 65 years of age or older. The gender makeup of the city was 49.1% male and 50.9% female.

=== 2000 census ===
As of the census of 2000, there were 229 people, 90 households, and 65 families residing in the city. The population density was 235.9 inhabitants per square mile (91.1/km^{2}). There were 97 housing units at an average density of 99.9 per square mile (38.6/km^{2}). The racial makeup of the city was 98.25% White, 0.44% African American, 0.87% Asian, and 0.44% from two or more races. Hispanic or Latino of any race were 4.37% of the population.

There were 90 households, out of which 37.8% had children under the age of 18 living with them, 66.7% were married couples living together, 4.4% had a female householder with no husband present, and 26.7% were non-families. 22.2% of all households were made up of individuals, and 13.3% had someone living alone who was 65 years of age or older. The average household size was 2.54 and the average family size was 2.98.

28.8% are under the age of 18, 5.7% from 18 to 24, 35.8% from 25 to 44, 17.5% from 45 to 64, and 12.2% who were 65 years of age or older. The median age was 33 years. For every 100 females, there were 90.8 males. For every 100 females age 18 and over, there were 96.4 males.

The median income for a household in the city was $35,000, and the median income for a family was $46,458. Males had a median income of $29,792 versus $22,778 for females. The per capita income for the city was $17,320. About 3.0% of families and 2.7% of the population were below the poverty line, including none of those under the age of eighteen and 7.4% of those 65 or over.

== Education ==
Its public schools are operated by the Central Springs Community School District, established on July 1, 2011, by the merger of North Central Community School District and Nora Springs–Rock Falls Community School District. Prior to the merger it was in the North Central district.

== Town celebration ==
Hanlontown celebrates the annual "Sundown Day" on June 21 (or the weekend before) every year. The celebration coincides with the sun setting on the railroad tracks and making them appear golden.
