= 1893 Pomeroy tornado =

1893 tornado in Iowa, USA

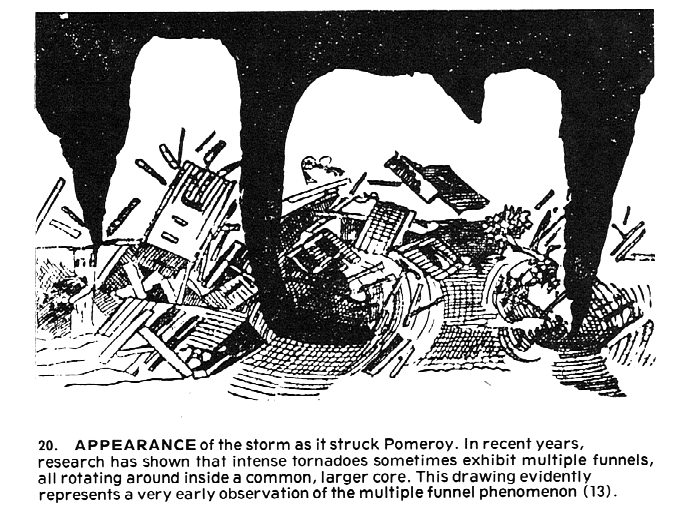
- A depiction of the Pomeroy tornado as it was passing through town.

Meteorological history
- Date: July 6, 1893
- Formed: July 6, 1893, 4:00 p.m. CDT (UTC–05:00)

F5 tornado
- on the Fujita scale
- Highest winds: 261–318 mph (420–512 km/h) (estimated)

Overall effects
- Fatalities: 71
- Injuries: 200+
- Damage: $400,000 (1893 USD)
- Areas affected: Cherokee, Buena Vista, Pocahontas, and Calhoun counties, Iowa

The 1893 Pomeroy tornado was a violent multiple-vortex tornado that occurred on July 6, 1893, in northwestern Iowa. The tornado traveled across portions of Cherokee, Buena Vista, Pocahontas, and Calhoun counties, causing major structural destruction along its path. Pomeroy faced most of the widespread damage from the tornado, with a large portion of its residential and commercial structures destroyed. The tornado resulted in 71 fatalities and over 200 injuries.

== Meteorological synopsis ==
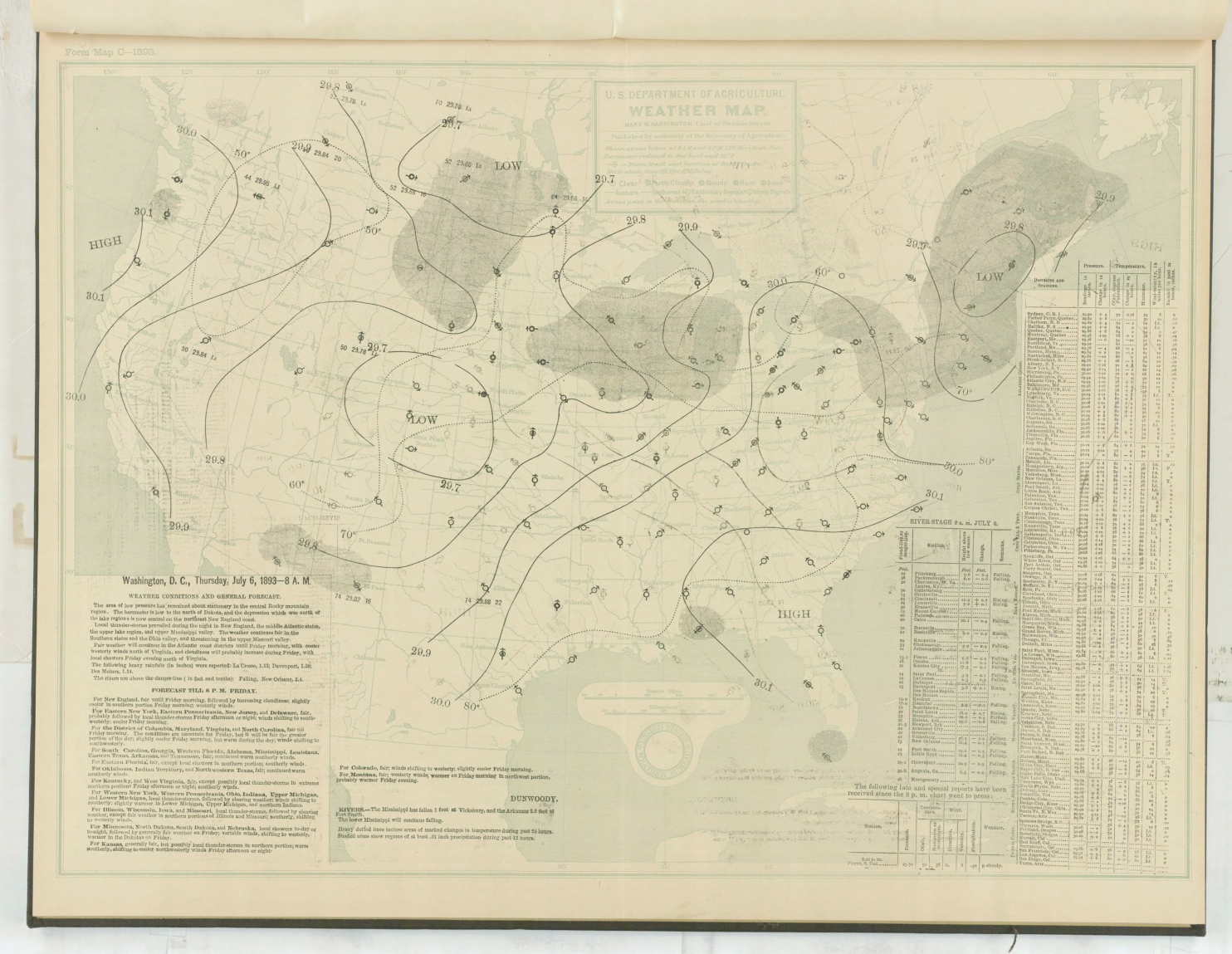
July 6, 1893 United States Weather Bureau surface weather map showing the low-pressure system over the central United States.

Warm, humid air moved into northwestern Iowa on July 5, 1893, bringing overnight cloud cover and rain. Clearing skies on the morning of July 6 allowed strong surface heating to push temperatures past 90 °F (32 °C) by early afternoon. A regional low-pressure area was centered along the Colorado–Kansas border, with a warm front extending northeastward into the Upper Mississippi Valley. As the boundary intensified through the afternoon, shifting winds and increasing instability triggered an outbreak of severe thunderstorms across the region.

== Tornado summary ==
At approximately 4:00 p.m. on July 6, the tornado touched down in eastern Cherokee County, about three miles northwest of Quimby. It traveled east-southeast through rural areas, striking several farmsteads. Houses, outbuildings, and farm machinery were destroyed near Quimby. One schoolhouse was also destroyed, while a drive-well pump and 40 feet of iron tubing were pulled from the ground.

The tornado then entered Buena Vista County and destroyed several bridges, including the Pilot Rock iron bridge over the Little Sioux River, which was displaced from its stone piers into the river channel. Multiple farmhouses were destroyed along this portion of the path, resulting in fatalities, injuries, and substantial livestock losses.

After crossing southern Pocahontas County, the tornado entered Calhoun County. At approximately 5:00 p.m., it reached the town of Pomeroy from the northwest.

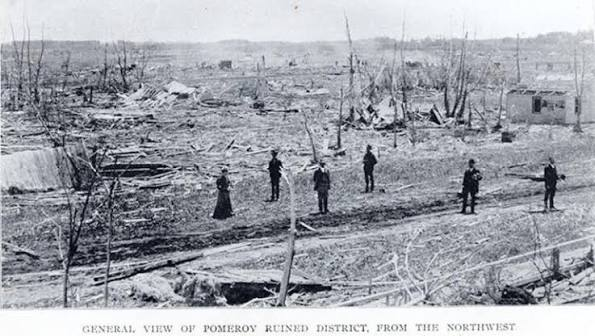
Damage inflicted in the town by the violent tornado.

The storm passed through the entire town. Approximately 80 percent of Pomeroy's homes were destroyed, of which 20 full blocks of houses were completely destroyed alongside businesses, churches, and public buildings along the central streets. A total of 49 people in Pomeroy were killed by the tornado, while more than 100 were injured, with 75 of these being severe. The tornado continued through the eastern part of town before weakening and lifting.

== Aftermath ==
Relief operations began immediately following the disaster. Medical personnel, supplies, and volunteers arrived in Pomeroy via special trains operated by the Illinois Central Railroad. Temporary medical facilities and shelters were set up in surviving structures and tents to care for the injured.

== See also ==
- List of F5 and EF5 tornadoes
- List of Iowa tornadoes
- Tornadoes in the United States
