= Plymouth, Iowa =

- City
- Location of Plymouth, Iowa
- Coordinates: 43°14′48″N 93°7′24″W
- Country: USA
- State: Iowa
- County: Cerro Gordo

Area
  - Total: 0.44 sq mi (1.14 km^{2})
  - Land: 0.44 sq mi (1.14 km^{2})
  - Water: 0 sq mi (0.00 km^{2})
- Elevation: 1,132 ft (345 m)

Population (2020)
  - Total: 375
  - Density: 849.6/sq mi (328.05/km^{2})
- Time zone: UTC-6 (Central (CST))
  - Summer (DST): UTC-5 (CDT)
- ZIP code: 50464
- Area code: 641
- FIPS code: 19-63885
- GNIS feature ID: 2396243
- Website: http://www.plymouthiowa.us/

Plymouth is a city in Cerro Gordo County, Iowa, United States, along the Shell Rock River. The population was 375 at the time of the 2020 census. It is part of the Mason City Micropolitan Statistical Area.

== Geography ==
According to the United States Census Bureau, the city has a total area of 0.44 square miles (1.14 km^{2}), all land.

== Demographics ==
Historical populations
Year	Pop.	±%
1880	239	—
1910	358	+49.8%
1920	366	+2.2%
1930	388	+6.0%
1940	427	+10.1%
1950	395	−7.5%
1960	422	+6.8%
1970	461	+9.2%
1980	463	+0.4%
1990	453	−2.2%
2000	429	−5.3%
2010	382	−11.0%
2020	375	−1.8%
Source:"U.S. Census website". United States Census Bureau. and Iowa Data Center; Source: U.S. Decennial Census

=== 2020 census ===
As of the census of 2020, there were 375 people, 156 households, and 116 families residing in the city. The population density was 849.7 inhabitants per square mile (328.1/km^{2}). There were 179 housing units at an average density of 405.6 per square mile (156.6/km^{2}). The racial makeup of the city was 91.2% White, 2.1% Black or African American, 0.3% Native American, 0.0% Asian, 0.0% Pacific Islander, 0.5% from other races and 5.9% from two or more races. Hispanic or Latino persons of any race comprised 2.4% of the population.

Of the 156 households, 29.5% of which had children under the age of 18 living with them, 59.0% were married couples living together, 8.3% were cohabitating couples, 16.7% had a female householder with no spouse or partner present and 16.0% had a male householder with no spouse or partner present. 25.6% of all households were non-families. 19.2% of all households were made up of individuals, 9.0% had someone living alone who was 65 years old or older.

The median age in the city was 43.3 years. 24.0% of the residents were under the age of 20; 3.2% were between the ages of 20 and 24; 24.5% were from 25 and 44; 33.1% were from 45 and 64; and 15.2% were 65 years of age or older. The gender makeup of the city was 49.1% male and 50.9% female.

=== 2010 census ===
As of the census of 2010, there were 382 people, 164 households, and 111 families residing in the city. The population density was 868.2 inhabitants per square mile (335.2/km^{2}). There were 180 housing units at an average density of 409.1 per square mile (158.0/km^{2}). The racial makeup of the city was 97.4% White, 0.5% African American, 0.3% Native American, 0.3% Asian, 0.3% Pacific Islander, and 1.3% from two or more races. Hispanic or Latino of any race were 2.4% of the population.

There were 164 households, of which 25.0% had children under the age of 18 living with them, 57.9% were married couples living together, 6.1% had a female householder with no husband present, 3.7% had a male householder with no wife present, and 32.3% were non-families. 27.4% of all households were made up of individuals, and 7.3% had someone living alone who was 65 years of age or older. The average household size was 2.33 and the average family size was 2.79.

The median age in the city was 45.4 years. 18.8% of residents were under the age of 18; 9.8% were between the ages of 18 and 24; 20.7% were from 25 to 44; 36.5% were from 45 to 64; and 14.4% were 65 years of age or older. The gender makeup of the city was 52.4% male and 47.6% female.

=== 2000 census ===
As of the census of 2000, there were 429 people, 164 households, and 120 families residing in the city. The population density was 976.6 inhabitants per square mile (377.1/km^{2}). There were 171 housing units at an average density of 389.3 per square mile (150.3/km^{2}). The racial makeup of the city was 98.83% White, 0.70% Native American, and 0.47% from two or more races. Hispanic or Latino of any race were 1.17% of the population.

There were 164 households, out of which 35.4% had children under the age of 18 living with them, 63.4% were married couples living together, 7.9% had a female householder with no husband present, and 26.8% were non-families. 22.0% of all households were made up of individuals, and 11.6% had someone living alone who was 65 years of age or older. The average household size was 2.62 and the average family size was 3.08.

In the city, the population was spread out, with 28.7% under the age of 18, 5.4% from 18 to 24, 27.5% from 25 to 44, 23.1% from 45 to 64, and 15.4% who were 65 years of age or older. The median age was 39 years. For every 100 females, there were 105.3 males. For every 100 females age 18 and over, there were 102.6 males.

The median income for a household in the city was $32,344, and the median income for a family was $40,179. Males had a median income of $31,042 versus $20,250 for females. The per capita income for the city was $12,888. About 4.1% of families and 6.3% of the population were below the poverty line, including 3.5% of those under age 18 and 6.3% of those age 65 or over.

== Education ==
Plymouth's public schools are operated by the Central Springs Community School District, established on July 1, 2011, by the merger of North Central Community School District and Nora Springs–Rock Falls Community School District. Prior to the merger, it was in the North Central district.
