= Shell Rock River =

Shell Rock River Shellrock River
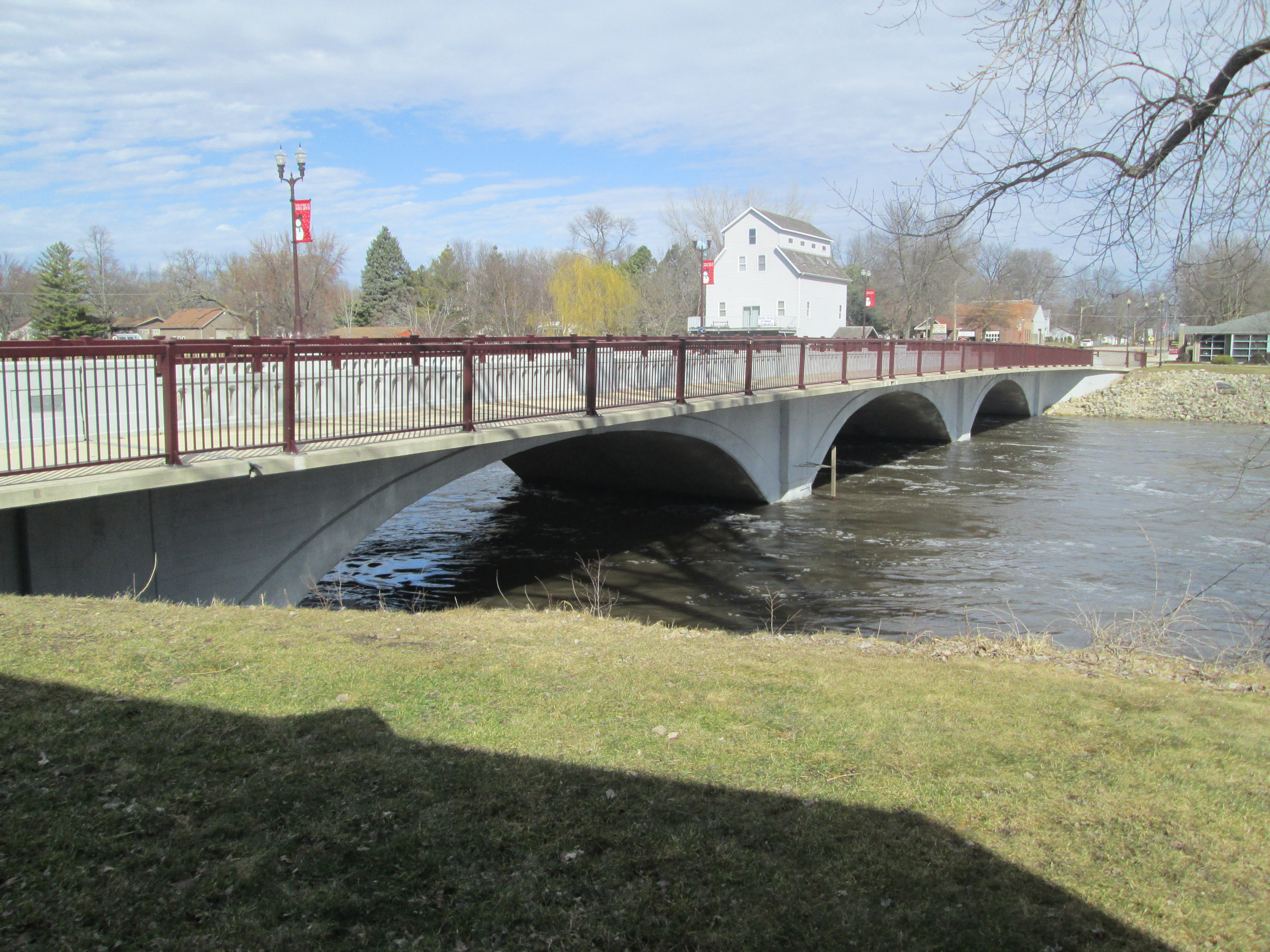
- Shell Rock River in Shell Rock, Iowa

- Location of mouth

Location
- Country: United States
- States: Minnesota, Iowa
- Counties (Minnesota): Freeborn
- Counties (Iowa): Worth, Cerro Gordo, Floyd, Butler, Bremer, Black Hawk

Physical characteristics
- Source: Albert Lea Lake
  - location: Freeborn County, Minnesota
  - coordinates: 43.6116242°N 93.2935403°W
- Mouth: West Fork Cedar River
  - location: Black Hawk County, Iowa
  - coordinates: 42.6341488°N 92.5012982°W
  - elevation: 869 ft (265 m)
- Length: 113 miles (182 km)
- Discharge
  - location: Shell Rock, Iowa
  - average: 1,211 cu/ft. per sec.

Basin features
- Tributaries
  - right: Winnebago River

The Shell Rock River is a 113-mile-long (182 km) tributary of the West Fork Cedar River in southern Minnesota and northern Iowa in the United States. Via the Cedar and Iowa rivers, it is part of the Mississippi River watershed.

== Name ==
This river was named for the fossil shells found in outcroppings along its banks. The United States Board on Geographic Names settled on "Shell Rock River" as the stream's name in 1931. According to the Geographic Names Information System, it has also been known by the spelling "Shellrock River".

== Course ==
The Shell Rock River flows from Albert Lea Lake in Freeborn County, Minnesota, and soon enters Iowa, flowing generally south-southeastwardly through eastern Worth, northeastern Cerro Gordo, western Floyd, northeastern Butler, southwestern Bremer and northwestern Black Hawk counties, past the town of Glenville in Minnesota and the towns of Northwood, Plymouth, Rock Falls, Nora Springs, Rockford, Marble Rock, Greene, Clarksville and Shell Rock in Iowa. It joins the West Fork of the Cedar River in Black Hawk County, about 6 miles (10 km) north-northwest of Cedar Falls. At Rockford, Iowa, it collects the Winnebago River from the west.

== See also ==
- List of Iowa rivers
- List of Minnesota rivers
