= Manly, Iowa =

- City
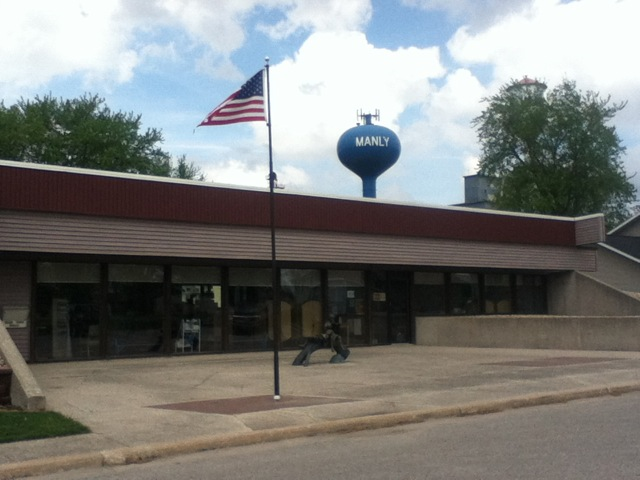
- Manly Public Library

- Location of Manly, Iowa
- Coordinates: 43°17′18″N 93°12′03″W
- Country: USA
- State: Iowa
- County: Worth

Area
  - Total: 1.41 sq mi (3.66 km^{2})
  - Land: 1.41 sq mi (3.66 km^{2})
  - Water: 0 sq mi (0.00 km^{2})
- Elevation: 1,194 ft (364 m)

Population (2020)
  - Total: 1,256
  - Density: 888.1/sq mi (342.89/km^{2})
- Time zone: UTC-6 (Central (CST))
  - Summer (DST): UTC-5 (CDT)
- ZIP code: 50456
- Area code: 641
- FIPS code: 19-48900
- GNIS feature ID: 2395833
- Website: www.cityofmanly.com

Manly is a city in Worth County, Iowa, United States, whose population was 1,256 at the time of the 2020 census. It is part of the Mason City Micropolitan Statistical Area.

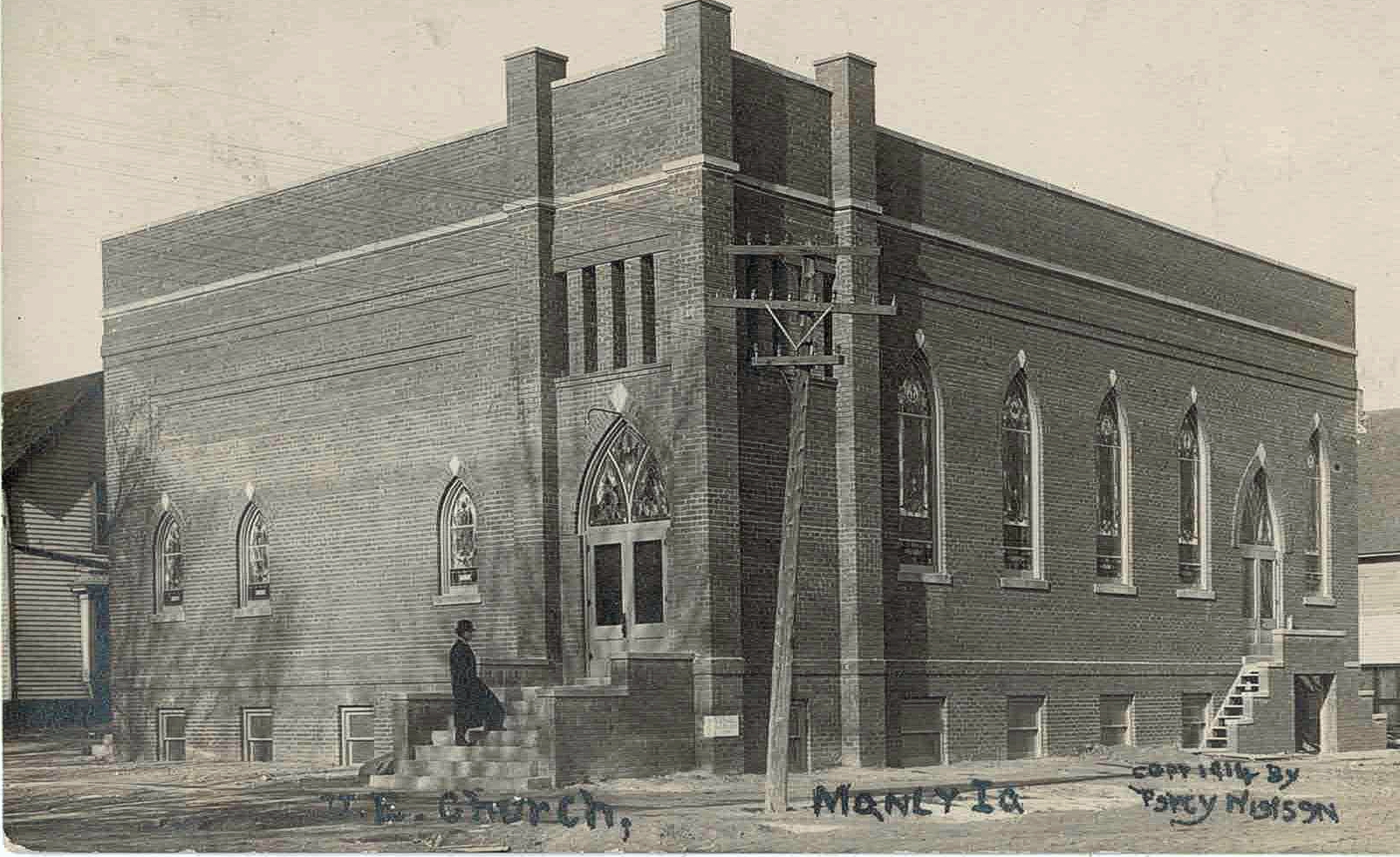
U.E. Church, circa 1914

== History ==
Manly (originally called Manly Junction) was laid out in 1877 at the junction of two railroads: the Rock Island and the Chicago Great Western.

In 1912 the Rock Island made it a division point, with roundhouse and shops that employed several hundred workers. A Rock Island caboose sits at the southeast railroad crossing of IA-9 in commemoration of the town's history, and in 2006 a Rock Island engine was installed next to it with a dedication ceremony held on Manly's annual Railroad/Ag Days celebration.

== Geography ==
Manly is located 16 miles south of the Minnesota border placed at the conjunction between Highway 65 and 9.

According to the United States Census Bureau, the city has a total area of 1.47 square miles (3.81 km^{2}), all land.

== Education ==
Manly's public schools are operated by the Central Springs Community School District, established on July 1, 2006, by the merger of North Central Community School District and Nora Springs–Rock Falls Community School District. Prior to the merger, it was in the North Central district.

Manly is the home of the Central Springs Panthers, previously the North Central Falcons. Elementary students from the Manly, Hanlontown, and Plymouth region go to school in Manly from preschool through 3rd grade. Elementary students from the Nora Springs, Rock Falls, and Portland area go to school in Nora Springs. All students then attend middle school in Nora Springs. Upon completion of 8th grade, they go to high school in Manly. The high school's colors are black and blue, and the mascot is a panther.

The schools in the Central Springs Community School District are:

- Central Springs High School (Manly)
- Central Springs Middle School (Nora Springs)
- Central Springs Elementary School – Manly campus (Manly)
- Central Springs Elementary School – Nora Springs campus (Nora Springs)

== Demographics ==
Historical populations
Year	Pop.	±%
1880	84	—
1900	359	+327.4%
1910	346	−3.6%
1920	1,476	+326.6%
1930	1,447	−2.0%
1940	1,445	−0.1%
1950	1,473	+1.9%
1960	1,425	−3.3%
1970	1,294	−9.2%
1980	1,496	+15.6%
1990	1,349	−9.8%
2000	1,342	−0.5%
2010	1,323	−1.4%
2020	1,256	−5.1%
Source:"U.S. Census website". United States Census Bureau. and Iowa Data Center; Source: U.S. Decennial Census

=== 2020 census ===
As of the 2020 census, there were 1,256 people, 522 households, and 330 families residing in the city. The median age was 41.2 years. 24.1% of residents were under the age of 18. The population density was 888.1 inhabitants per square mile (342.9/km^{2}), and there were 600 housing units at an average density of 424.2 per square mile (163.8/km^{2}). For every 100 females, there were 94.1 males, and for every 100 females age 18 and over there were 87.2 males age 18 and over.

Of the 522 households, 28.7% had children under the age of 18 living with them, 45.4% were married couples living together, 7.1% were cohabitating couples, 25.5% had a female householder with no spouse or partner present, and 22.0% had a male householder with no spouse or partner present. 36.8% of all households were non-families. 32.2% of all households were made up of individuals, and 15.9% had someone living alone who was 65 years old or older.

Of all housing units, 13.0% were vacant. The homeowner vacancy rate was 2.4%, and the rental vacancy rate was 16.3%.

0.0% of residents lived in urban areas, while 100.0% lived in rural areas.

The age distribution was 26.0% under the age of 20, 5.0% from 20 to 24, 23.2% from 25 to 44, 25.8% from 45 to 64, and 20.0% age 65 or older. The gender makeup of the city was 48.5% male and 51.5% female.

Racial composition as of the 2020 census
Race	Number	Percent
White	1,178	93.8%
Black or African American	9	0.7%
American Indian and Alaska Native	4	0.3%
Asian	7	0.6%
Native Hawaiian and Other Pacific Islander	0	0.0%
Some other race	8	0.6%
Two or more races	50	4.0%
Hispanic or Latino (of any race)	34	2.7%

=== 2010 census ===
As of the census of 2010, there were 1,323 people, 534 households, and 350 families residing in the city. The population density was 900.0 inhabitants per square mile (347.5/km^{2}). There were 601 housing units at an average density of 408.8 per square mile (157.8/km^{2}). The racial makeup of the city was 97.7% White, 0.5% African American, 0.2% Native American, 0.3% Asian, 0.3% from other races, and 1.0% from two or more races. Hispanic or Latino people of any race were 2.5% of the population.

There were 534 households, of which 33.5% had children under the age of 18 living with them, 50.0% were married couples living together, 11.2% had a female householder with no husband present, 4.3% had a male householder with no wife present, and 34.5% were non-families. 29.2% of all households were made up of individuals, and 16.3% had someone living alone who was 65 years of age or older. The average household size was 2.41 and the average family size was 2.97.

The median age in the city was 39.3 years. 27% of residents were under the age of 18; 6.3% were between the ages of 18 and 24; 23.9% were from 25 to 44; 23.9% were from 45 to 64; and 19% were 65 years of age or older. The gender makeup of the city was 47.3% male and 52.7% female.

=== 2000 census ===
As of the census of 2000, there were 1,342 people, 559 households, and 367 families residing in the city. The population density was 933.2 inhabitants per square mile (360.3/km^{2}). There were 594 housing units at an average density of 413.1 per square mile (159.5/km^{2}). The racial makeup of the city was 97.47% White, 0.97% African American, 0.22% Native American, 0.07% Asian, 0.07% Pacific Islander, 0.15% from other races, and 1.04% from two or more races. Hispanic or Latino people of any race were 1.64% of the population.

There were 559 households, out of which 32.2% had children under the age of 18 living with them, 52.1% were married couples living together, 9.7% had a female householder with no husband present, and 34.3% were non-families. 30.2% of all households were made up of individuals, and 16.6% had someone living alone who was 65 years of age or older. The average household size was 2.35 and the average family size was 2.92.

26.3% were under the age of 18, 7.3% from 18 to 24, 26.7% from 25 to 44, 20.0% from 45 to 64, and 19.7% were 65 years of age or older. The median age was 38 years. For every 100 females, there were 88.7 males. For every 100 females age 18 and over, there were 84.9 males.

The median income for a household in the city was $33,603, and the median income for a family was $41,364. Males had a median income of $29,875 versus $21,067 for females. The per capita income for the city was $15,808. About 4.7% of families and 7.9% of the population were below the poverty line, including 10.2% of those under age 18 and 8.2% of those age 65 or over.
