= Hazel Gertrude Kinscella =

- Born: April 27, 1893; Nora Springs, Iowa
- Died: June 14, 1960 (aged 67); Seattle, Washington
- Education: University School of Music, Lincoln, Nebraska; University of Nebraska; Columbia University; University of Washington
- Occupations: Musicologist, composer, and teacher
- Known for: Originating the Kinscella method of piano instruction

Hazel Gertrude Kinscella (27 April 1893 — 14 June 1960) was an American musicologist, composer, and teacher. She was a well-known writer of books about music, particularly the history of American music, and was the originator of the Kinscella method of teaching piano in public schools, on which she lectured and demonstrated extensively.

== Life ==
Hazel Gertrude Kinscella was born in 1893 in Nora Springs, Iowa, where she obtained her primary and secondary education. In 1912 and 1913 she studied piano with Rafael Joseffy in New York City. Kinscella received degrees in music from the University School of Music in Lincoln, Nebraska in 1916 and 1928. She obtained a BFA from the University of Nebraska, an AM from Columbia University, and a PhD from the University of Washington in 1941. She worked as an instructor in piano at the University School of Music, Lincoln, Nebraska; professor of music at the University of Nebraska; and lecturer on American music at the University of Washington.

Kinscella originated what became known as the Kinscella method of piano teaching in public schools, still used today. She lectured and demonstrated the system extensively in the US and abroad.

She composed and arranged many works, including the Steps for the Young Pianist series (1919-1926),Velocity Studies for the Young Pianist (1924), In Chinatown (1934), Psalm 150, Our Prayer (1934), Folk Tune Trios (1934), and Liberty’s Island (1946). She also wrote the Music Appreciation Readers (six books) between 1926 and 1927, as well as more than sixty professional articles.

Kinscella was a member of the Nebraska Writers Guild, the Writers Guild of America, the Nebraskana Society, Phi Beta Kappa, the Nebraska State Teachers Association, and the Presbyterian Church.

Kinscella died in Seattle, Washington on 14 June 1960.

== Bibliography ==
- Kinscella Readers: Essentials of piano technique a volume of practice material for teacher and student (1921)
- Kinscella Music Appreciation Readers (1926)
- Music and romance for youth: a course of study in music appreciation for use in junior high schools, also in platoon and consolidated schools, academies, junior clubs (1930)
- The man in the drum: and other tales (1930)
- Conrad's magic flight (1930)
- Around the world in story (1930)
- Music on the air (1934)
- Music in the small school (1939)
- History Sings: Backgrounds of American Music (1940)
- Flag Over Sitka (1947)
- The child and his music: a handbook for the use of the teacher in the elementary grades, or in the small school (1953)
