= Central Springs Community School District =

Public school district in Manly, Iowa, United States

Coordinates: 43.286108°N 93.196035°W

Location
- Manly, Iowa Cerro Gordo, Floyd, Mitchell, and Worth counties United States
- Coordinates: 43.286108, -93.196035

District information
- Type: Local school district
- Grades: K-12
- Established: 2011
- Superintendent: Darwin Lehmann
- Schools: 4
- Budget: $12,759,000 (2020-21)
- NCES District ID: 1920760

Students and staff
- Students: 813 (2022-23)
- Teachers: 55.46 FTE
- Staff: 68.91 FTE
- Student–teacher ratio: 14.66
- Athletic conference: Top of Iowa Conference
- District mascot: Panthers
- Colors: Royal Blue and Black

Other information
- Website: www.centralsprings.net

Central Springs Community School District is a rural, public school district headquartered in Manly, Iowa. The district is located in sections of Cerro Gordo, Floyd, Mitchell, and Worth counties. It serves Manly, Nora Springs, Hanlontown, Plymouth, and Rock Falls.

It covers a portion of the Portland census-designated place (as of the 2020 U.S. census).

== History ==
The district was established on July 1, 2011, by the merger of North Central Community School District and Nora Springs–Rock Falls Community School District. The vote to merge the districts, held on September 14, 2010, was successful, with North Central voters doing so on a 431–63 (85.35%) basis and Nora Springs–Rock Falls voters doing so on a 437–262 (59.95%) basis. These two districts had, since 2007, enacted a whole grade sharing program.

"Central Springs" was chosen as the name of the consolidated district as the grade-shared secondary schools already used that name. The projected enrollment of the combined school district upon its tentative formation was 850.

== Schools ==
- Central Springs High School (Manly)
  - The school colors are royal blue and black, with the former from North Central and the latter from Nora Springs–Rock Falls. The school wanted a mascot showing strength, so the panther was chosen as the mascot.
- Central Springs Middle School (Nora Springs)
- Manly Elementary School
- Nora Springs Elementary School

In 2015, the grade distribution was PK-4 at the elementary level, 5–8 at the middle school level, and 9–12 at the high school level. By 2015, the enrollment had declined further, so the district was considering whether or how to reconfigure grade levels.

=== Central Springs High School ===
==== Athletics ====
The Panthers participate in the Top of Iowa Conference in the following sports:

- Football
- Cross Country
- Volleyball
- Basketball
- Bowling
- Wrestling
- Golf
- Track and Field
- Baseball
- Softball
- Esports

== See also ==
- List of school districts in Iowa
- List of high schools in Iowa
