= Rock Falls, Iowa =

- City
- Location of Rock Falls, Iowa
- Coordinates: 43°12′26″N 93°05′12″W
- Country: USA
- State: Iowa
- County: Cerro Gordo
- Incorporated: July 17, 1882

Area
  - Total: 0.21 sq mi (0.54 km^{2})
  - Land: 0.21 sq mi (0.54 km^{2})
  - Water: 0 sq mi (0.00 km^{2})
- Elevation: 1,089 ft (332 m)

Population (2020)
  - Total: 150
  - Density: 724.8/sq mi (279.85/km^{2})
- Time zone: UTC-6 (Central (CST))
  - Summer (DST): UTC-5 (CDT)
- ZIP code: 50467
- Area code: 641
- FIPS code: 19-68025
- GNIS feature ID: 2396398

Rock Falls is a city in Cerro Gordo County, Iowa, United States, along the Shell Rock River. The population was 150 at the time of the 2020 census. It is part of the Mason City Micropolitan Statistical Area. A post office named Shell Rock Falls opened in 1855; in 1872 this was changed to Rock Falls.

== Geography ==
According to the United States Census Bureau, the city has a total area of 0.21 square miles (0.54 km^{2}), all land.

== Demographics ==
Historical populations
Year	Pop.	±%
1870	221	—
1880	221	+0.0%
1890	122	−44.8%
1900	124	+1.6%
1910	87	−29.8%
1920	85	−2.3%
1930	109	+28.2%
1940	153	+40.4%
1950	139	−9.2%
1960	156	+12.2%
1970	150	−3.8%
1980	196	+30.7%
1990	155	−20.9%
2000	170	+9.7%
2010	155	−8.8%
2020	150	−3.2%
Source:"U.S. Census website". United States Census Bureau. and Iowa Data Center; Source: U.S. Decennial Census

=== 2020 census ===
As of the census of 2020, there were 150 people, 70 households, and 46 families residing in the city. The population density was 724.8 inhabitants per square mile (279.9/km^{2}). There were 72 housing units at an average density of 347.9 per square mile (134.3/km^{2}). The racial makeup of the city was 96.7% White, 0.7% Black or African American, 0.0% Native American, 0.0% Asian, 0.0% Pacific Islander, 0.0% from other races and 2.7% from two or more races. Hispanic or Latino persons of any race comprised 2.7% of the population.

Of the 70 households, 30.0% of which had children under the age of 18 living with them, 57.1% were married couples living together, 10.0% were cohabitating couples, 12.9% had a female householder with no spouse or partner present and 20.0% had a male householder with no spouse or partner present. 34.3% of all households were non-families. 22.9% of all households were made up of individuals, 17.1% had someone living alone who was 65 years old or older.

The median age in the city was 45.0 years. 18.7% of the residents were under the age of 20; 6.7% were between the ages of 20 and 24; 24.7% were from 25 and 44; 19.3% were from 45 and 64; and 30.7% were 65 years of age or older. The gender makeup of the city was 47.3% male and 52.7% female.

=== 2010 census ===
As of the census of 2010, there were 155 people, 68 households, and 50 families residing in the city. The population density was 738.1 inhabitants per square mile (285.0/km^{2}). There were 74 housing units at an average density of 352.4 per square mile (136.1/km^{2}). The racial makeup of the city was 98.7% White, 0.6% Asian, and 0.6% from two or more races.

There were 68 households, of which 22.1% had children under the age of 18 living with them, 66.2% were married couples living together, 4.4% had a female householder with no husband present, 2.9% had a male householder with no wife present, and 26.5% were non-families. 19.1% of all households were made up of individuals, and 10.3% had someone living alone who was 65 years of age or older. The average household size was 2.28 and the average family size was 2.64.

The median age in the city was 49.5 years. 14.8% of residents were under the age of 18; 4.7% were between the ages of 18 and 24; 24.5% were from 25 to 44; 29.1% were from 45 to 64; and 27.1% were 65 years of age or older. The gender makeup of the city was 51.0% male and 49.0% female.

=== 2000 census ===
As of the census of 2000, there were 170 people, 68 households, and 55 families residing in the city. The population density was 806.7 inhabitants per square mile (311.5/km^{2}). There were 69 housing units at an average density of 327.4 per square mile (126.4/km^{2}). The racial makeup of the city was 100.00% White. Hispanic or Latino of any race were 0.59% of the population.

There were 68 households, out of which 32.4% had children under the age of 18 living with them, 69.1% were married couples living together, 5.9% had a female householder with no husband present, and 19.1% were non-families. 17.6% of all households were made up of individuals, and 8.8% had someone living alone who was 65 years of age or older. The average household size was 2.50 and the average family size was 2.76.

In the city, the population was spread out, with 22.4% under the age of 18, 5.9% from 18 to 24, 29.4% from 25 to 44, 25.9% from 45 to 64, and 16.5% who were 65 years of age or older. The median age was 42 years. For every 100 females, there were 102.4 males. For every 100 females age 18 and over, there were 94.1 males.

The median income for a household in the city was $40,714, and the median income for a family was $42,917. Males had a median income of $28,750 versus $16,719 for females. The per capita income for the city was $17,523. None of the families and 1.1% of the population were living below the poverty line, including no under eighteens and 4.4% of those over 64.

== Education ==
Rock Falls' public schools are operated by the Central Springs Community School District, established on July 1, 2011, by the merger of North Central Community School District and Nora Springs–Rock Falls Community School District.
