= Nora Springs, Iowa =

- City
- Location of Nora Springs, Iowa
- Coordinates: 43°08′40″N 93°00′21″W
- Country: United States
- State: Iowa
- Counties: Floyd, Cerro Gordo

Area
  - Total: 2.24 sq mi (5.81 km^{2})
  - Land: 2.22 sq mi (5.74 km^{2})
  - Water: 0.027 sq mi (0.07 km^{2})
- Elevation: 1,053 ft (321 m)

Population (2020)
  - Total: 1,369
  - Density: 617.7/sq mi (238.48/km^{2})
- Time zone: UTC-6 (Central (CST))
  - Summer (DST): UTC-5 (CDT)
- ZIP code: 50458
- Area code: 641
- FIPS code: 19-56910
- GNIS feature ID: 2395244
- Website: www.citynorasprings.com

Nora Springs is a city that is mostly in Floyd County and partially in Cerro Gordo County in the U.S. state of Iowa, along the Shell Rock River. The population was 1,369 at the time of the 2020 census.

The Cerro Gordo County portion of Nora Springs is part of the Mason City Micropolitan Statistical Area.

== History ==
Nora Springs was founded in 1857 and was incorporated in 1875. It was first called Woodstock, but community pioneer Edson Gaylord, managed to persuade wealthy pioneer Edward Greeley of nearby Woodbridge (later Nashua) to come to town. Greeley agreed to buy and improve the gristmill, and to purchase 20 acres of land from Gaylord, if the town would change its name from Woodstock to Elnora, in honor of a former lady love from Vermont. Gaylord had wanted the town to be named "Springs" and as a result of a compromise, Woodstock became Elnora Springs, quickly shortened to Nora Springs. Shortly thereafter, Greeley made a trip to Vermont; upon his return, he sold the land back to Gaylord, returned to Woodbridge, and never visited Nora Springs again.

At its founding, the town's business district was located near the millpond and nearby gristmill, at the western end of present day Sixth Street NW. Two competing railroads began laying track several blocks to the south; as a result, the downtown gradually moved nearer to the rail lines, and the former business district became known to locals as Old Town. The gristmill went out of business, and stood empty for many years. It was demolished in the late 1950s. The millrace and dam still exist, and in recent years, the city has developed the area into a scenic park. A footbridge over the Shell Rock River dam was constructed in 2019.

== Geography ==
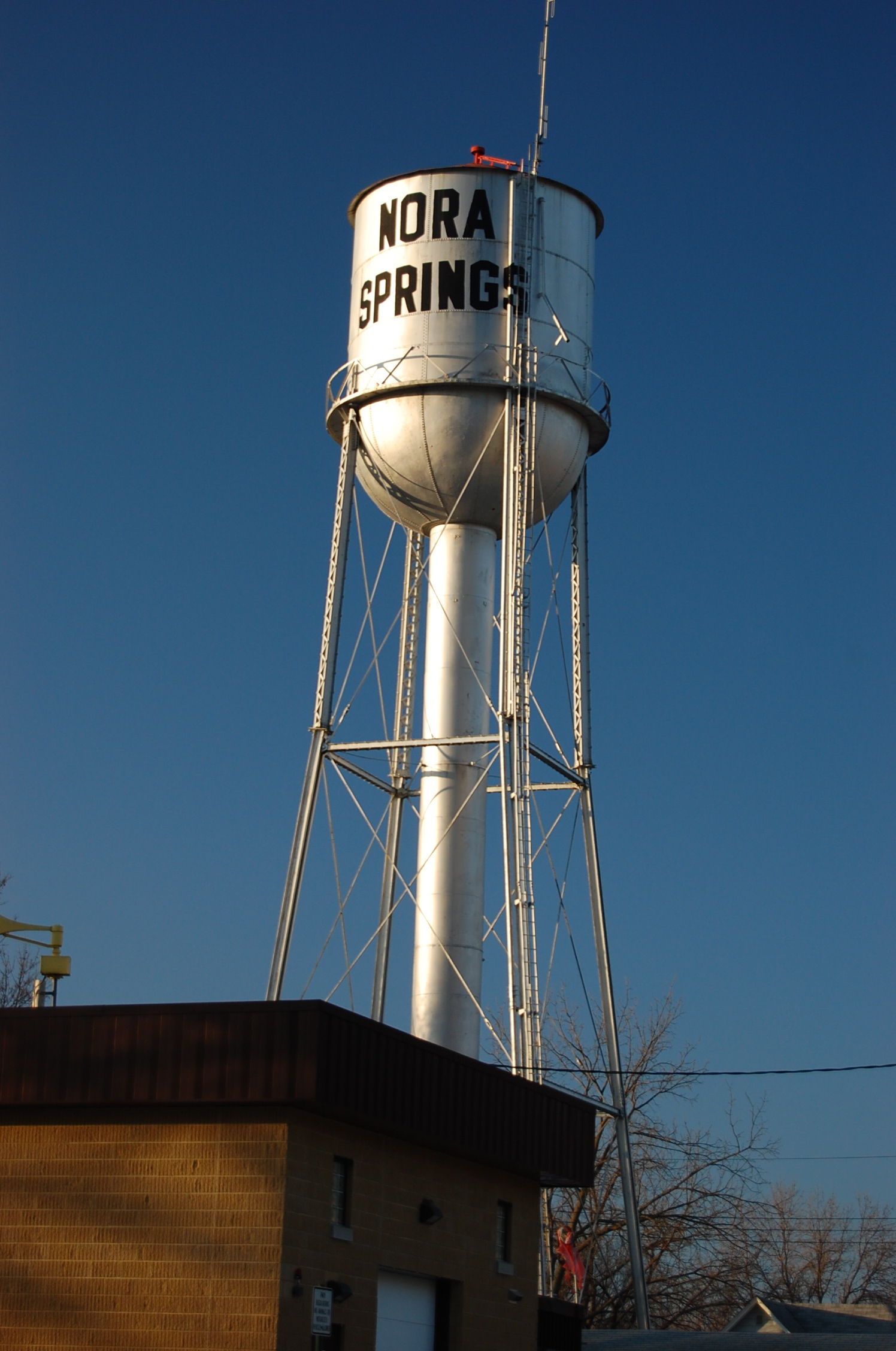
Water Tower in downtown Nora Springs, Iowa

According to the United States Census Bureau, the city has a total area of 2.22 square miles (5.75 km^{2}), of which 2.19 square miles (5.67 km^{2}) is land and 0.03 square miles (0.08 km^{2}) is water.

== Demographics ==
Historical populations
| Year | Pop. | ±% |
|---|---|---|
| 1880 | 617 | — |
| 1890 | 846 | +37.1% |
| 1900 | 1,209 | +42.9% |
| 1910 | 985 | −18.5% |
| 1920 | 1,055 | +7.1% |
| 1930 | 1,070 | +1.4% |
| 1940 | 1,198 | +12.0% |
| 1950 | 1,257 | +4.9% |
| 1960 | 1,275 | +1.4% |
| 1970 | 1,337 | +4.9% |
| 1980 | 1,572 | +17.6% |
| 1990 | 1,505 | −4.3% |
| 2000 | 1,532 | +1.8% |
| 2010 | 1,431 | −6.6% |
| 2020 | 1,369 | −4.3% |
Source:"U.S. Census website". United States Census Bureau. and Iowa Data Center; Source: U.S. Decennial Census

=== 2020 census ===
As of the 2020 census, Nora Springs had a population of 1,369, with 574 households and 358 families. The population density was 617.7 inhabitants per square mile (238.5/km^{2}). There were 620 housing units at an average density of 279.7 per square mile (108.0/km^{2}).

The median age was 41.4 years. 22.9% of residents were under the age of 18, and 22.2% were 65 years of age or older. 25.3% of residents were under the age of 20; 5.1% were between the ages of 20 and 24; 23.4% were from 25 to 44; and 24.0% were from 45 to 64. The gender makeup of the city was 48.2% male and 51.8% female. For every 100 females, there were 93.1 males, and for every 100 females age 18 and over there were 90.4 males age 18 and over.

Of the 574 households, 28.2% had children under the age of 18 living in them. 46.5% were married-couple households, 20.7% were households with a male householder and no spouse or partner present, and 26.1% were households with a female householder and no spouse or partner present. 37.6% of households were non-families, 33.8% of all households were made up of individuals, and 16.1% had someone living alone who was 65 years of age or older. Of all households, 6.6% were cohabitating couples.

Of the 620 housing units, 7.4% were vacant. The homeowner vacancy rate was 1.9% and the rental vacancy rate was 14.0%.

0.0% of residents lived in urban areas, while 100.0% lived in rural areas.

Racial composition as of the 2020 census
| Race | Number | Percent |
|---|---|---|
| White | 1,267 | 92.5% |
| Black or African American | 23 | 1.7% |
| American Indian and Alaska Native | 3 | 0.2% |
| Asian | 4 | 0.3% |
| Native Hawaiian and Other Pacific Islander | 1 | 0.1% |
| Some other race | 18 | 1.3% |
| Two or more races | 53 | 3.9% |
| Hispanic or Latino (of any race) | 54 | 3.9% |

=== 2010 census ===
As of the census of 2010, there were 1,431 people, 577 households, and 388 families residing in the city. The population density was 653.4 inhabitants per square mile (252.3/km^{2}). There were 636 housing units at an average density of 290.4 per square mile (112.1/km^{2}). The racial makeup of the city was 99.1% White, 0.1% African American, 0.2% Asian, 0.1% from other races, and 0.6% from two or more races. Hispanic or Latino of any race were 1.4% of the population.

There were 577 households, of which 32.2% had children under the age of 18 living with them, 54.9% were married couples living together, 9.9% had a female householder with no husband present, 2.4% had a male householder with no wife present, and 32.8% were non-families. 28.4% of all households were made up of individuals, and 13.4% had someone living alone who was 65 years of age or older. The average household size was 2.37 and the average family size was 2.91.

The median age in the city was 41.2 years. 24% of residents were under the age of 18; 7.1% were between the ages of 18 and 24; 23.3% were from 25 to 44; 27.5% were from 45 to 64; and 18% were 65 years of age or older. The gender makeup of the city was 49.0% male and 51.0% female.

=== 2000 census ===
As of the census of 2000, there were 1,532 people, 597 households, and 401 families residing in the city. The population density was 700.5 inhabitants per square mile (270.5/km^{2}). There were 629 housing units at an average density of 287.6 per square mile (111.0/km^{2}). The racial makeup of the city was 99.54% White, 0.07% African American, 0.13% Native American, 0.07% from other races, and 0.20% from two or more races. Hispanic or Latino of any race were 0.85% of the population.

There were 597 households, out of which 31.8% had children under the age of 18 living with them, 55.9% were married couples living together, 7.9% had a female householder with no husband present, and 32.8% were non-families. 29.6% of all households were made up of individuals, and 14.1% had someone living alone who was 65 years of age or older. The average household size was 2.39 and the average family size was 2.95.

24.0% are under the age of 18, 7.8% from 18 to 24, 26.6% from 25 to 44, 23.2% from 45 to 64, and 18.4% who were 65 years of age or older. The median age was 40 years. For every 100 females, there were 95.2 males. For every 100 females age 18 and over, there were 89.7 males.

The median income for a household in the city was $34,926, and the median income for a family was $43,516. Males had a median income of $28,043 versus $21,536 for females. The per capita income for the city was $16,246. About 3.0% of families and 5.3% of the population were below the poverty line, including 3.9% of those under age 18 and 7.5% of those age 65 or over.

== Nora Springs Buffalo Days ==
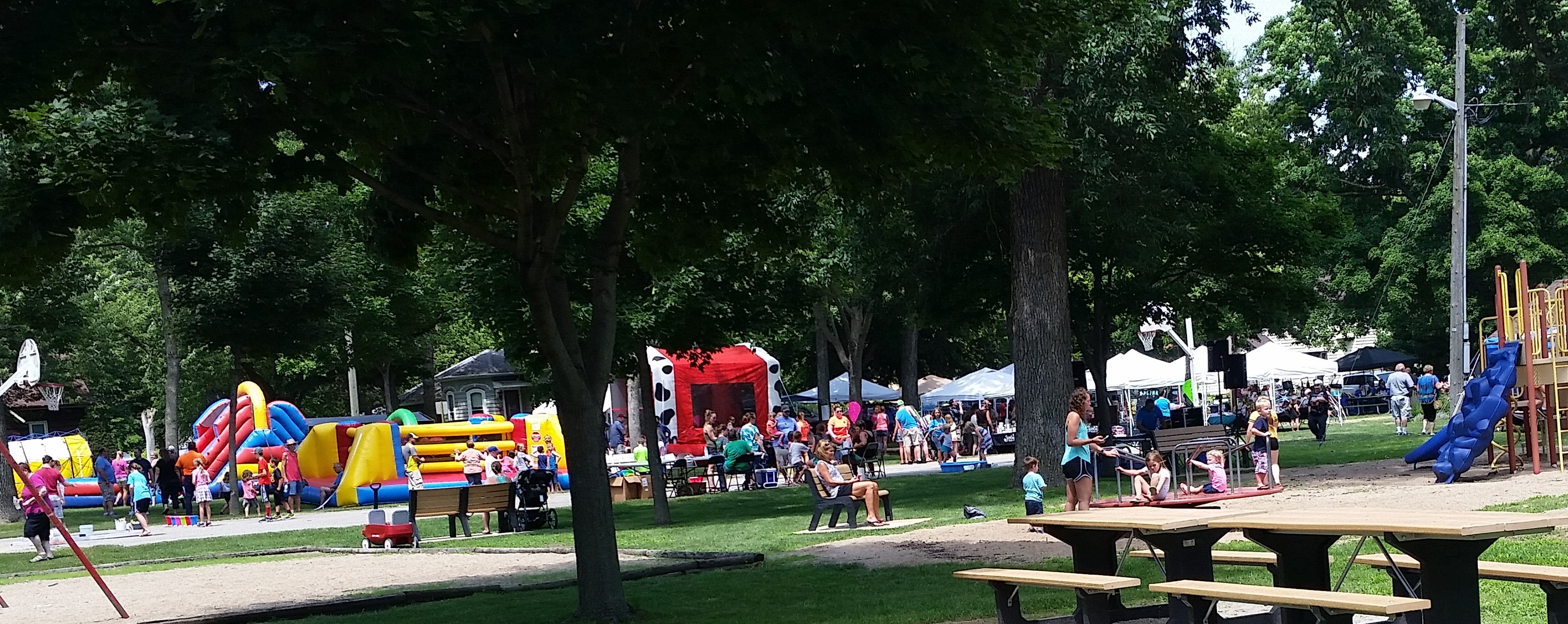
Buffalo Days at Boulder Park

The last week of June always marks Nora Springs Buffalo Days. Festivities include a parade, entertainment at Boulder Park such as food vendors, and inflatable rides. Other activities include a 5K Run/Walk and Bingo. At the Fire Department the Fireman's Ball is held from 9 p.m. to 1 a.m.

== Education ==
Its public schools are operated by the Central Springs Community School District, established on July 1, 2011, by the merger of North Central Community School District and Nora Springs–Rock Falls Community School District. The athletic teams are the Central Springs Panthers.

All high school students in the district, grades 9-12, as well as K-3 elementary students from the Plymouth, Manly, and Hanlontown area attend school at the Manly site. Meanwhile, all middle school students, grades 4-8, plus grades K-3 from the Nora Springs and Rock Falls area, plus those from the unincorporated community of Portland, attend school at the Nora Springs site. The school colors are black and blue, the mascot being a panther.

== Notable people ==
- Louis Bauman, minister of the Brethren Church
- Wilberforce Gaylord, Iowa state legislator
- Arthur Gratias, Iowa state senator
- John P. Gregg, college football player and coach
- Hazel Gertrude Kinscella, musicologist and educator

== See also ==
- National Register of Historic Places listings in Floyd County, Iowa
