= Wilberforce Gaylord =

American politician (1824–1880)

Wilberforce P. Gaylord (1824–1880) was an American politician.

Gaylord was born in New Milford, Connecticut, in 1824. He was one of five brothers who all eventually moved to Iowa. Gaylord arrived Iowa for the first time in 1854. Later that year, he traveled to Wisconsin, where he remained for one year, returning to Iowa in late 1855, when his family traveled from New Jersey to join him. They lived near Nora Springs as Gaylord practiced law in Mason City. Gaylord was elected to two consecutive terms on the Iowa House of Representatives as a Republican, first for Cerro Gordo County and Floyd County (District 56) from 1866 to 1868, then only Floyd County (District 54) until 1870. For four months in 1880, until his death on 27 April, Gaylord served on the Iowa Senate for District 46.
