= Bennett, Iowa =

- City
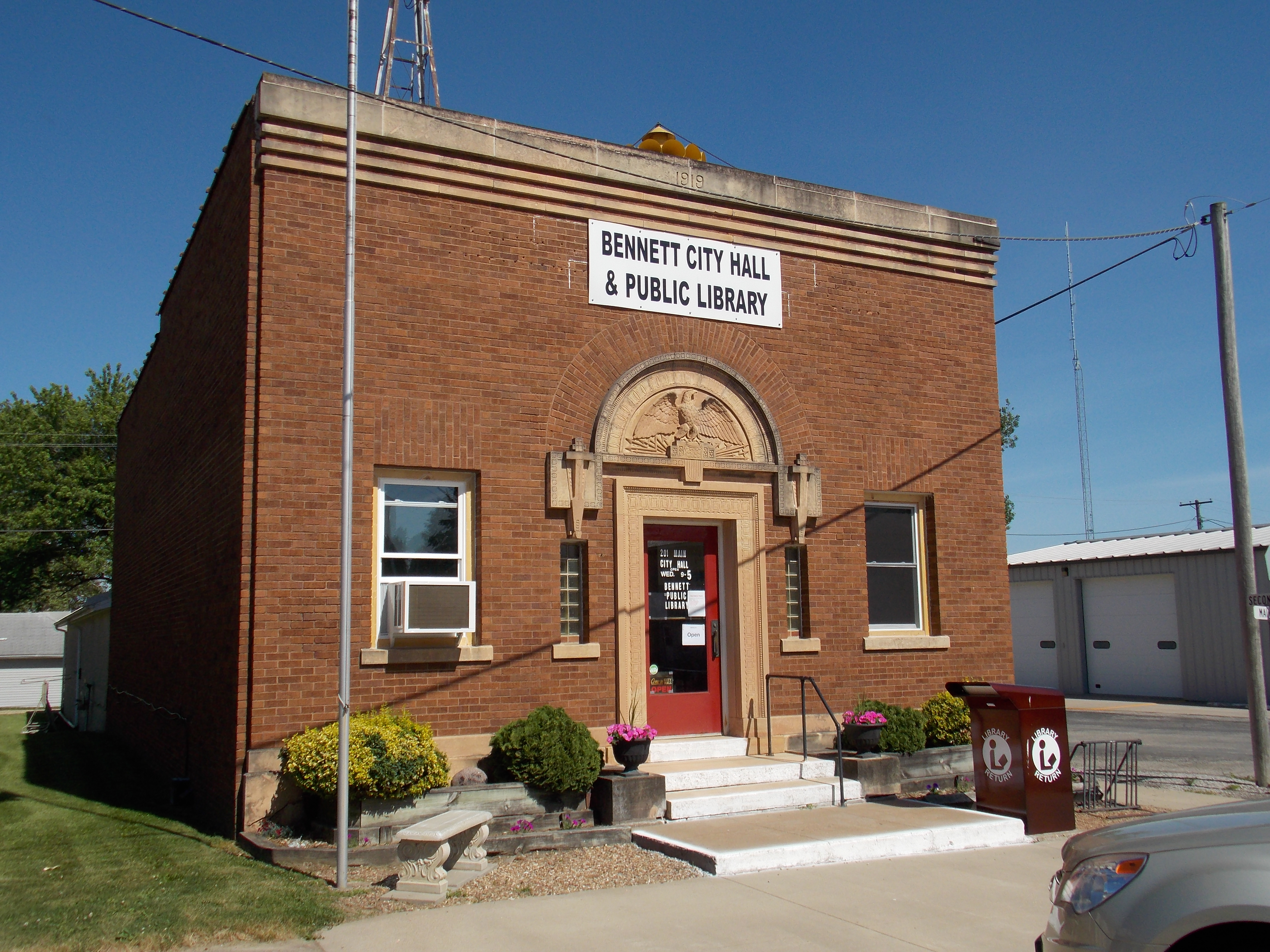
- Bennett's city hall and library in downtown

- Location of Bennett, Iowa
- Coordinates: 41°44′23″N 90°58′25″W
- Country: United States
- State: Iowa
- County: Cedar

Area
  - Total: 0.21 sq mi (0.54 km^{2})
  - Land: 0.21 sq mi (0.54 km^{2})
  - Water: 0 sq mi (0.00 km^{2})
- Elevation: 751 ft (229 m)

Population (2020)
  - Total: 347
  - Density: 1,675.5/sq mi (646.93/km^{2})
- Time zone: UTC-6 (Central (CST))
  - Summer (DST): UTC-5 (CDT)
- ZIP code: 52721
- Area code: 563
- FIPS code: 19-05770
- GNIS feature ID: 2394135
- Website: www.bennettiowa.com

Bennett is a city in Cedar County, Iowa, United States. The population was 347 at the 2020 census.

== Geography ==
According to the United States Census Bureau, the city has a total area of 0.20 square miles (0.52 km^{2}), all land.

== Demographics ==
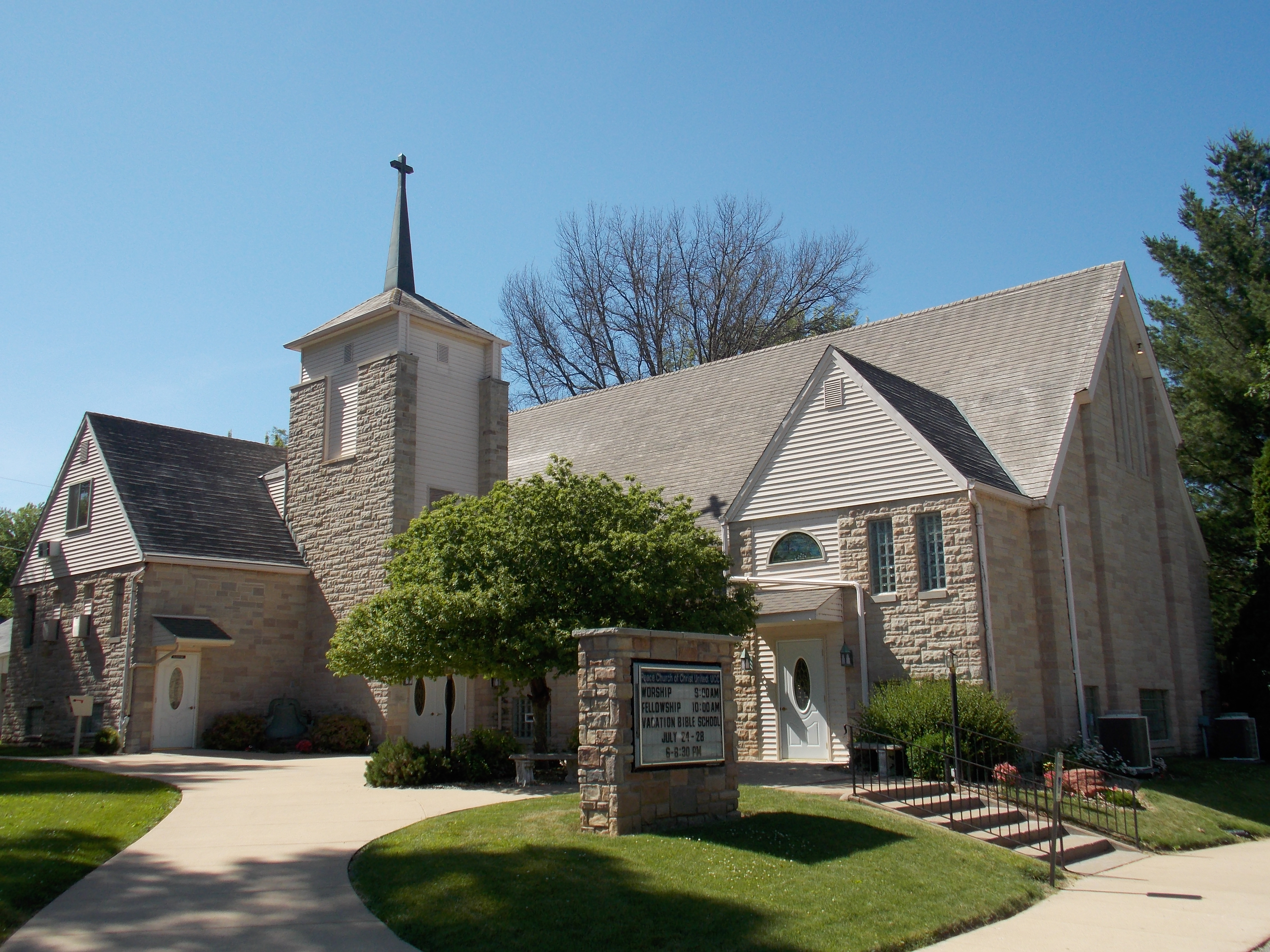
Peace Church of Christ United

Historical populations
Year	Pop.	±%
1900	238	—
1910	243	+2.1%
1920	362	+49.0%
1930	305	−15.7%
1940	352	+15.4%
1950	357	+1.4%
1960	374	+4.8%
1970	385	+2.9%
1980	458	+19.0%
1990	395	−13.8%
2000	395	+0.0%
2010	405	+2.5%
2020	347	−14.3%
Source:"U.S. Census website". United States Census Bureau. and Iowa Data Center; Source: U.S. Decennial Census

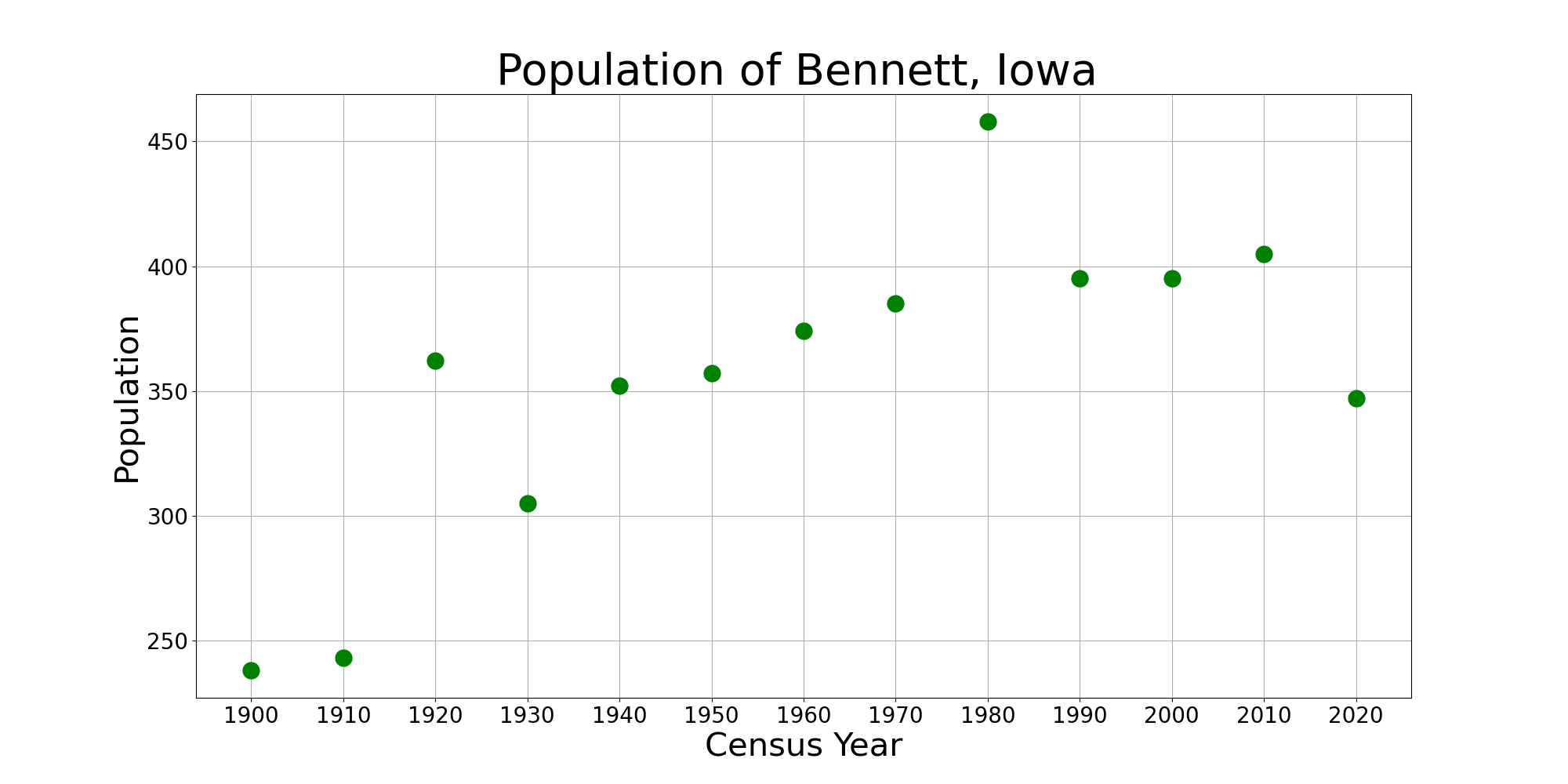
The population of Bennett, Iowa from US census data

=== 2020 census ===
As of the census of 2020, there were 347 people, 152 households, and 95 families residing in the city. The population density was 1,675.5 inhabitants per square mile (646.9/km^{2}). There were 163 housing units at an average density of 787.1 per square mile (303.9/km^{2}). The racial makeup of the city was 97.1% White, 0.0% Black or African American, 0.0% Native American, 1.4% Asian, 0.0% Pacific Islander, 0.0% from other races and 1.4% from two or more races. Hispanic or Latino persons of any race comprised 0.9% of the population.

Of the 152 households, 25.0% of which had children under the age of 18 living with them, 48.0% were married couples living together, 10.5% were cohabitating couples, 23.0% had a female householder with no spouse or partner present and 18.4% had a male householder with no spouse or partner present. 37.5% of all households were non-families. 27.6% of all households were made up of individuals, 12.5% had someone living alone who was 65 years old or older.

The median age in the city was 46.3 years. 21.9% of the residents were under the age of 20; 3.5% were between the ages of 20 and 24; 23.6% were from 25 and 44; 33.1% were from 45 and 64; and 17.9% were 65 years of age or older. The gender makeup of the city was 49.3% male and 50.7% female.

=== 2010 census ===
As of the census of 2010, there were 405 people, 160 households, and 116 families living in the city. The population density was 2,025.0 inhabitants per square mile (781.9/km^{2}). There were 172 housing units at an average density of 860.0 per square mile (332.0/km^{2}). The racial makeup of the city was 97.5% White, 0.5% African American, 1.5% Asian, and 0.5% from two or more races. Hispanic or Latino of any race were 2.5% of the population.

There were 160 households, of which 37.5% had children under the age of 18 living with them, 60.6% were married couples living together, 10.6% had a female householder with no husband present, 1.3% had a male householder with no wife present, and 27.5% were non-families. 25.0% of all households were made up of individuals, and 10.6% had someone living alone who was 65 years of age or older. The average household size was 2.53 and the average family size was 3.01.

The median age in the city was 38.7 years. 28.1% of residents were under the age of 18; 4.8% were between the ages of 18 and 24; 26.7% were from 25 to 44; 23.6% were from 45 to 64; and 16.8% were 65 years of age or older. The gender makeup of the city was 50.4% male and 49.6% female.

=== 2000 census ===
As of the census of 2000, there were 395 people, 157 households, and 114 families living in the city. The population density was 1,916.4 inhabitants per square mile (739.9/km^{2}). There were 163 housing units at an average density of 790.8 per square mile (305.3/km^{2}). The racial makeup of the city was 98.48% White, 0.51% Native American, 0.25% Asian, and 0.76% from two or more races. Hispanic or Latino of any race were 0.25% of the population.

There were 157 households, out of which 31.8% had children under the age of 18 living with them, 61.8% were married couples living together, 7.6% had a female householder with no husband present, and 26.8% were non-families. 23.6% of all households were made up of individuals, and 11.5% had someone living alone who was 65 years of age or older. The average household size was 2.52 and the average family size was 2.97.

In the city, the population was spread out, with 26.3% under the age of 18, 8.4% from 18 to 24, 28.9% from 25 to 44, 22.5% from 45 to 64, and 13.9% who were 65 years of age or older. The median age was 35 years. For every 100 females, there were 102.6 males. For every 100 females age 18 and over, there were 99.3 males.

The median income for a household in the city was $41,429, and the median income for a family was $47,679. Males had a median income of $31,442 versus $19,500 for females. The per capita income for the city was $17,320. About 1.8% of families and 1.8% of the population were below the poverty line, including 1.9% of those under age 18 and 5.4% of those age 65 or over.

== Education ==
The town is home to a public school, Bennett Community School, whose district includes the town of Bennett and surrounding rural areas as well as the neighboring town of New Liberty, Iowa. The school had been K-12, but beginning with the 2005–2006 school year, the junior and senior high school (grades 7-12) entered into a whole grade sharing agreement with a nearby school in Durant, primarily due to declining enrollment and budget shortfalls. The elementary school continues to operate as before.
