= Pomeroy, Iowa =

- City
- Location of Pomeroy, Iowa
- Coordinates: 42°33′07″N 94°40′40″W
- Country: US
- State: Iowa
- County: Calhoun

Government
  - Type: Mayor-council

Area
  - Total: 2.05 sq mi (5.30 km^{2})
  - Land: 2.05 sq mi (5.30 km^{2})
  - Water: 0 sq mi (0.00 km^{2})
- Elevation: 1,227 ft (374 m)

Population (2020)
  - Total: 526
  - Density: 256.8/sq mi (99.17/km^{2})
- Time zone: UTC-6 (Central (CST))
  - Summer (DST): UTC-5 (CDT)
- ZIP code: 50575
- Area code: 712
- FIPS code: 19-64065
- GNIS feature ID: 2396248
- Website: City of Pomeroy

Pomeroy is a city in Calhoun County, Iowa, United States. The population was 526 at the time of the 2020 census.

== History ==
Pomeroy was platted in 1870 in anticipation of the railroad being built through the settlement. It was named for Charles Pomeroy, an Iowa politician.

On July 6, 1893, Pomeroy was struck by a tornado that was later estimated to be F5 on the Fujita scale. With a damage path 500 yards (460 m) wide and 55 miles (89 km) long, the tornado destroyed about 80% of the homes in Pomeroy. The tornado killed 71 people and injured 200.

== Geography ==
According to the United States Census Bureau, the city has a total area of 2.04 square miles (5.28 km^{2}), all land.

Pomeroy lies within the western side of Manson crater, an impact structure buried by glacial till and outwash.

== Demographics ==
Historical populations
| Year | Pop. | ±% |
|---|---|---|
| 1880 | 185 | — |
| 1890 | 481 | +160.0% |
| 1900 | 910 | +89.2% |
| 1910 | 815 | −10.4% |
| 1920 | 874 | +7.2% |
| 1930 | 826 | −5.5% |
| 1940 | 843 | +2.1% |
| 1950 | 868 | +3.0% |
| 1960 | 816 | −6.0% |
| 1970 | 765 | −6.2% |
| 1980 | 895 | +17.0% |
| 1990 | 762 | −14.9% |
| 2000 | 710 | −6.8% |
| 2010 | 662 | −6.8% |
| 2020 | 526 | −20.5% |
Source:"U.S. Census website". United States Census Bureau. and Iowa Data Center; Source: U.S. Decennial Census

=== 2020 census ===
As of the census of 2020, there were 526 people, 248 households, and 131 families residing in the city. The population density was 256.8 inhabitants per square mile (99.2/km^{2}). There were 301 housing units at an average density of 147.0 per square mile (56.7/km^{2}). The racial makeup of the city was 93.7% White, 0.4% Black or African American, 0.8% Native American, 0.0% Asian, 0.0% Pacific Islander, 1.0% from other races and 4.2% from two or more races. Hispanic or Latino persons of any race comprised 3.2% of the population.

Of the 248 households, 22.2% of which had children under the age of 18 living with them, 39.9% were married couples living together, 10.5% were cohabitating couples, 30.6% had a female householder with no spouse or partner present and 19.0% had a male householder with no spouse or partner present. 47.2% of all households were non-families. 41.5% of all households were made up of individuals, 22.6% had someone living alone who was 65 years old or older.

The median age in the city was 49.9 years. 21.5% of the residents were under the age of 20; 4.4% were between the ages of 20 and 24; 20.3% were from 25 and 44; 27.0% were from 45 and 64; and 26.8% were 65 years of age or older. The gender makeup of the city was 48.7% male and 51.3% female.

=== 2010 census ===
As of the census of 2010, there were 662 people, 280 households, and 171 families living in the city. The population density was 324.5 inhabitants per square mile (125.3/km^{2}). There were 350 housing units at an average density of 171.6 per square mile (66.3/km^{2}). The racial makeup of the city was 96.8% White, 0.5% African American, 1.1% Native American, 0.3% Asian, 0.9% from other races, and 0.5% from two or more races. Hispanic or Latino of any race were 3.2% of the population.

There were 280 households, of which 24.6% had children under the age of 18 living with them, 49.3% were married couples living together, 7.1% had a female householder with no husband present, 4.6% had a male householder with no wife present, and 38.9% were non-families. 35.0% of all households were made up of individuals, and 20.3% had someone living alone who was 65 years of age or older. The average household size was 2.25 and the average family size was 2.90.

The median age in the city was 47 years. 21.5% of residents were under the age of 18; 8.9% were between the ages of 18 and 24; 17.6% were from 25 to 44; 23.4% were from 45 to 64; and 28.4% were 65 years of age or older. The gender makeup of the city was 47.3% male and 52.7% female.

=== 2000 census ===
As of the census of 2000, there were 710 people, 314 households, and 184 families living in the city. The population density was 347.4 inhabitants per square mile (134.1/km^{2}). There were 356 housing units at an average density of 174.2 per square mile (67.3/km^{2}). The racial makeup of the city was 99.58% White, 0.14% Native American, 0.14% from other races, and 0.14% from two or more races. Hispanic or Latino of any race were 0.28% of the population.

There were 314 households, out of which 25.2% had children under the age of 18 living with them, 50.0% were married couples living together, 7.3% had a female householder with no husband present, and 41.4% were non-families. 39.8% of all households were made up of individuals, and 22.0% had someone living alone who was 65 years of age or older. The average household size was 2.12 and the average family size was 2.86.

In the city, the population was spread out, with 21.5% under the age of 18, 5.8% from 18 to 24, 20.4% from 25 to 44, 23.2% from 45 to 64, and 29.0% who were 65 years of age or older. The median age was 47 years. For every 100 females, there were 81.1 males. For every 100 females age 18 and over, there were 77.4 males.

The median income for a household in the city was $24,531, and the median income for a family was $34,028. Males had a median income of $27,083 versus $22,083 for females. The per capita income for the city was $15,702. About 9.8% of families and 11.5% of the population were below the poverty line, including 17.5% of those under age 18 and 6.7% of those age 65 or over.

== Education ==
Pocahontas Area Community School District operates public schools. It was in the Pomeroy School District until July 1, 1993, when it consolidated into the Pomeroy–Palmer Community School District; on July 1, 2012, that district consolidated into the Pocahontas Area School District.

== Notable people ==
- Gordon Prange, author of At Dawn We Slept, The Untold Story Of Pearl Harbor
- Paul Schell, mayor of Seattle, Washington, lawyer
