= Walnut City, Iowa =

- Unincorporated community
- Location within Iowa
- Coordinates: 40°48′44″N 92°56′42″W
- Country: United States
- State: Iowa
- County: Appanoose
- Elevation: 997 ft (304 m)
- Time zone: UTC-6 (Central (CST))
  - Summer (DST): UTC-5 (CDT)
- Area code: 641
- GNIS feature ID: 464790

Walnut City is an unincorporated community in Appanoose County, Iowa, United States.

== History ==
Walnut City was laid out in 1858. A post office was established in Walnut City in 1867, and remained in operation until it was discontinued in 1897.

Walnut City's population was 33 in 1900, 11 in 1915, and was 32 in 1925.

Walnut City's population was 30 in 1940.
