= North Central Community School District =

Former school district in Iowa, United States

North Central Community School District was a school district headquartered in Manly, Iowa.

It was located in portions of Cerro Gordo and Worth counties, and served Manly, Hanlontown, and Plymouth. Prior to 2007, its high school was North Central High School (NCHS).

In 2007, it enacted a whole grade sharing program with the Nora Springs–Rock Falls Community School District. The NS-RF school board voted unanimously to accept the proposal on Monday, June 19, 2006, and the two districts formally signed the grade sharing agreement on Thursday, July 20, 2006. Nora Springs began hosting a combined middle school while Manly began hosting a combined high school. The superintendent of North Central, Bruce Burton, used the North Butler schools' (of Greene CSD and Allison–Bristow CSD, now North Butler CSD) 28E agreement as a model for consolidation during the merger discussions. Teachers largely supported the consolidation as it meant students would have a larger variety of classes and the teachers would have fewer subjects to prepare for.

The vote to merge the districts, held on September 14, 2010, was successful, with North Central voters doing so on a 431–63 (85.35%) basis and Nora Springs–Rock Falls voters doing so on a 437–262 (59.95%) basis. On July 1, 2011, it merged with the NS-RF district to make the Central Springs Community School District.
