= Nora Springs–Rock Falls Community School District =

School district in Nora Springs, Iowa

Nora Springs–Rock Falls Community School District was a school district headquartered in Nora Springs, Iowa, United States, serving that city and Rock Falls. It operated a single school serving all grades.

In 2007 it enacted a whole grade sharing program with the North Central Community School District. The NS-RF school board voted unanimously to accept the proposal on June 19, 2006, and the two districts formally signed the grade sharing agreement on July 20, 2006. Nora Springs began hosting a combined middle school while Manly began hosting a combined high school. The superintendent of North Central, Bruce Burton, used the North Butler schools' (of Greene CSD and Allison–Bristow CSD, now North Butler CSD) 28E agreement as a model for consolidation during the merger discussions. Teachers largely supported the consolidation as it meant students would have a larger variety of classes and the teachers would have fewer subjects to prepare for.

The vote to merge the districts, held on September 14, 2010, was successful. North Central voters supported the merger with a 431–63 (85.35%) majority, while Nora Springs–Rock Falls voters did so with 262-175 (59.95%) majority. On July 1, 2011, it officially merged with the North Central district to form the Central Springs Community School District.
