= Mason City micropolitan area =

Mason City Area North Iowa Corridor
- Micropolitan Statistical Area
- Mason City, IA Micropolitan Statistical Area
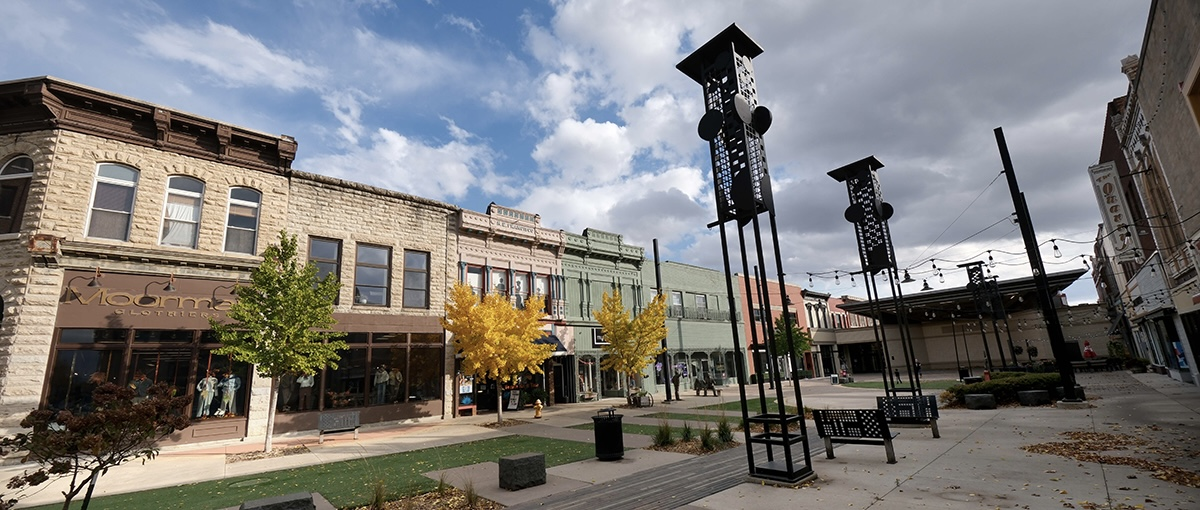
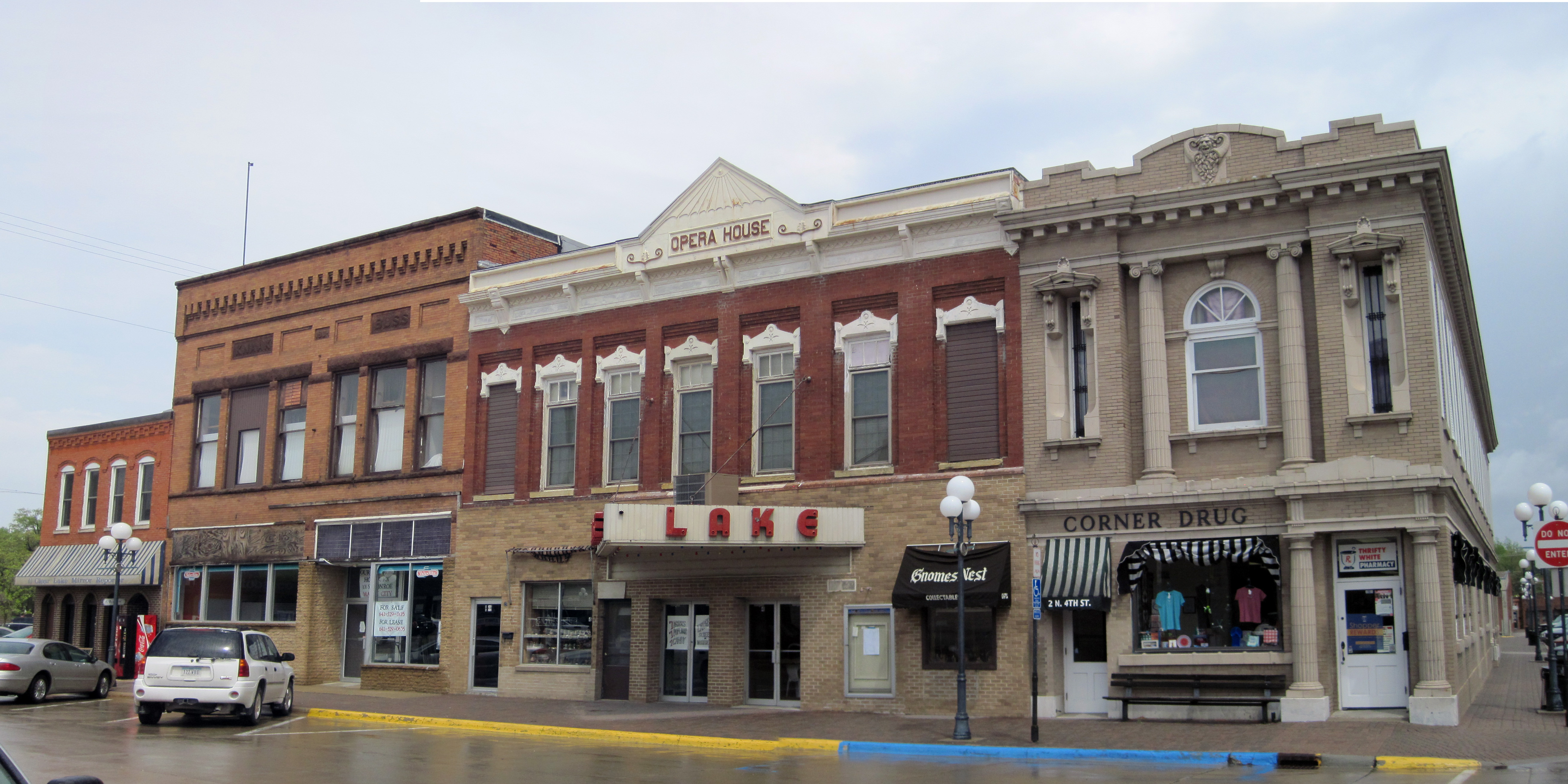
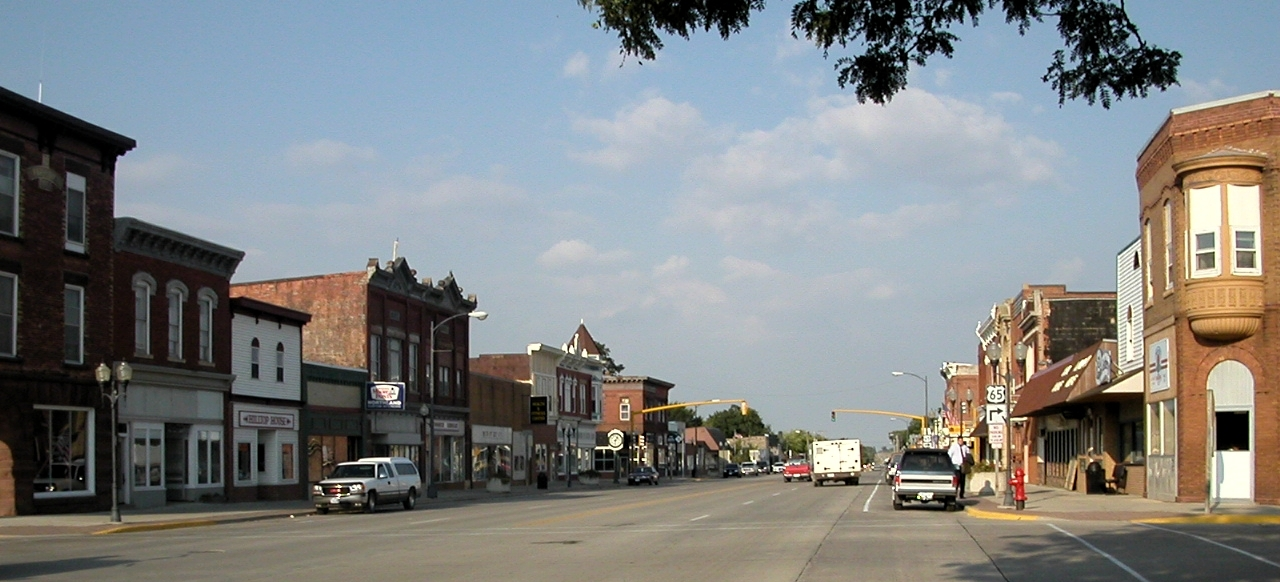
- Federal Plaza, Downtown Mason City Clear Lake Northwood
Interactive Map of Mason City, IA μSA
Mason City
Mason City, IA μSA
- Country: United States
- State: Iowa
- Largest city: Mason City
- Time zone: UTC−6 (CST)
  - Summer (DST): UTC−5 (CDT)

The Mason City Micropolitan Statistical Area, as defined by the United States Census Bureau, is an area consisting of two counties in north central Iowa, anchored by the city of Mason City the county seat of Cerro Gordo County, Iowa. This regional area is known locally as the North Iowa Corridor. The other cities within this micropolitan area with populations over 2,000 are Clear Lake and Northwood.

As of the 2000 census, the area had a population of 54,356 (though a July 1, 2009 estimate placed the population at 51,150).

== Counties ==
- Cerro Gordo
- Worth

== Communities ==
=== Places with more than 25,000 inhabitants ===
- Mason City (Principal city)

=== Places with 1,000 to 10,000 inhabitants ===
- Clear Lake
- Manly
- Nora Springs (partial)
- Northwood
- Rockwell

=== Places with less than 1,000 inhabitants ===
- Dougherty
- Fertile
- Grafton
- Hanlontown
- Joice
- Kensett
- Meservey
- Plymouth
- Rock Falls
- Rockford
- Swaledale
- Thornton
- Ventura

=== Unincorporated places ===
- Bolan

== Townships ==
=== Cerro Gordo County ===
- Bath
- Clear Lake
- Dougherty
- Falls
- Geneseo
- Grant
- Grimes
- Lake
- Lime Creek
- Lincoln
- Mason
- Mount Vernon
- Owen
- Pleasant Valley
- Portland
- Union

=== Worth County ===
- Barton
- Bristol
- Brookfield
- Danville
- Deer Creek
- Fertile
- Grove
- Hartland
- Kensett
- Lincoln
- Silver Lake
- Union

== Demographics ==
As of the census of 2000, there were 54,356 people, 22,652 households, and 14,664 families residing within the μSA. The racial makeup of the μSA was 96.57% White, 0.73% African American, 0.16% Native American, 0.62% Asian, 0.02% Pacific Islander, 0.81% from other races, and 1.10% from two or more races. Hispanic or Latino of any race were 2.60% of the population.

The median income for a household in the μSA was $36,156, and the median income for a family was $43,931. Males had a median income of $29,859 versus $21,339 for females. The per capita income for the μSA was $18,068.

== See also ==
- Iowa census statistical areas
