= Iowa statistical areas =

Coordinates: 42.0751°N 93.4960°W

The U.S. State of Iowa currently has 31 statistical areas that have been delineated by the Office of Management and Budget (OMB). On July 21, 2023, the OMB delineated seven combined statistical areas, nine metropolitan statistical areas, and 15 micropolitan statistical areas in Iowa. As of 2025, the largest of these is the Des Moines–West Des Moines–Ames, IA CSA, comprising the area around Iowa's capital and largest city, Des Moines.

== Statistical areas ==
The Office of Management and Budget (OMB) has designated more than 1,000 statistical areas for the United States and Puerto Rico. These statistical areas are important geographic delineations of population clusters used by the OMB, the United States Census Bureau, planning organizations, and federal, state, and local government entities.

The OMB defines a core-based statistical area (CBSA) as the county or counties (or county-equivalents) surrounding at least one densely-settled core of at least 10,000 population, "plus adjacent counties having a high degree of social and economic integration with the core as measured through commuting ties with the counties containing the core". The OMB further divides a CBSA based on population into a metropolitan statistical area (MSA) for those with at least 50,000 people or a micropolitan statistical area (μSA) for those with 10,000 to 49,999 people.

The OMB defines a combined statistical area (CSA) as two or more adjacent CBSAs where the employment interchange rate (percent commuting from A to B plus percent commuting from B to A) is at least 15%. A primary statistical area (PSA) includes all CSAs and any CBSA that is not a constituent of a combined statistical area.

The 31 United States statistical areas and 99 counties of the State of Iowa (Note: An out-of-state area and its population are displayed in green. An area that extends into more than one state is displayed in purple. A purple population number over a black population number show the total population versus the in-state population.)
| Combined statistical area | 2025 population (est.) | Core-based statistical area | 2025 population (est.) | County | 2025 population (est.) |
|---|---|---|---|---|---|
| Des Moines–West Des Moines–Ames, IA CSA | 942,701 | Des Moines–West Des Moines, IA MSA | 758,539 | Polk County, Iowa | 516,546 |
| Des Moines–West Des Moines–Ames, IA CSA | 942,701 | Des Moines–West Des Moines, IA MSA | 758,539 | Dallas County, Iowa | 118,457 |
| Des Moines–West Des Moines–Ames, IA CSA | 942,701 | Des Moines–West Des Moines, IA MSA | 758,539 | Warren County, Iowa | 57,331 |
| Des Moines–West Des Moines–Ames, IA CSA | 942,701 | Des Moines–West Des Moines, IA MSA | 758,539 | Jasper County, Iowa | 38,153 |
| Des Moines–West Des Moines–Ames, IA CSA | 942,701 | Des Moines–West Des Moines, IA MSA | 758,539 | Madison County, Iowa | 17,270 |
| Des Moines–West Des Moines–Ames, IA CSA | 942,701 | Des Moines–West Des Moines, IA MSA | 758,539 | Guthrie County, Iowa | 10,782 |
| Des Moines–West Des Moines–Ames, IA CSA | 942,701 | Ames, IA MSA | 128,090 | Story County, Iowa | 101,291 |
| Des Moines–West Des Moines–Ames, IA CSA | 942,701 | Ames, IA MSA | 128,090 | Boone County, Iowa | 26,799 |
| Des Moines–West Des Moines–Ames, IA CSA | 942,701 | Pella, IA μSA | 34,192 | Marion County, Iowa | 34,192 |
| Des Moines–West Des Moines–Ames, IA CSA | 942,701 | Oskaloosa, IA μSA | 21,880 | Mahaska County, Iowa | 21,880 |
| Cedar Rapids–Iowa City, IA CSA | 461,996 | Cedar Rapids, IA MSA | 279,285 | Linn County, Iowa | 232,028 |
| Cedar Rapids–Iowa City, IA CSA | 461,996 | Cedar Rapids, IA MSA | 279,285 | Benton County, Iowa | 26,004 |
| Cedar Rapids–Iowa City, IA CSA | 461,996 | Cedar Rapids, IA MSA | 279,285 | Jones County, Iowa | 21,253 |
| Cedar Rapids–Iowa City, IA CSA | 461,996 | Iowa City, IA MSA | 182,711 | Johnson County, Iowa | 160,044 |
| Cedar Rapids–Iowa City, IA CSA | 461,996 | Iowa City, IA MSA | 182,711 | Washington County, Iowa | 22,667 |
| Davenport–Moline, IA-IL CSA | 468,307; 263,114 (IA) | Davenport–Moline–Rock Island, IA-IL MSA | 380,452; 175,259 (IA) | Scott County, Iowa | 175,259 |
| Davenport–Moline, IA-IL CSA | 468,307; 263,114 (IA) | Davenport–Moline–Rock Island, IA-IL MSA | 380,452; 175,259 (IA) | Rock Island County, Illinois | 141,869 |
| Davenport–Moline, IA-IL CSA | 468,307; 263,114 (IA) | Davenport–Moline–Rock Island, IA-IL MSA | 380,452; 175,259 (IA) | Henry County, Illinois | 48,095 |
| Davenport–Moline, IA-IL CSA | 468,307; 263,114 (IA) | Davenport–Moline–Rock Island, IA-IL MSA | 380,452; 175,259 (IA) | Mercer County, Illinois | 15,229 |
| Davenport–Moline, IA-IL CSA | 468,307; 263,114 (IA) | Clinton, IA μSA | 46,002 | Clinton County, Iowa | 46,002 |
| Davenport–Moline, IA-IL CSA | 468,307; 263,114 (IA) | Muscatine, IA μSA | 41,853 | Muscatine County, Iowa | 41,853 |
| none | | Waterloo–Cedar Falls, IA MSA | 169,189 | Black Hawk County, Iowa | 131,532 |
| none | | Waterloo–Cedar Falls, IA MSA | 169,189 | Bremer County, Iowa | 25,296 |
| none | | Waterloo–Cedar Falls, IA MSA | 169,189 | Grundy County, Iowa | 12,361 |
| Sioux City–Le Mars, IA-NE-SD CSA | 171,435; 132,346 (IA) | Sioux City, IA-NE-SD MSA | 145,738; 106,649 (IA) | Woodbury County, Iowa | 106,649 |
| Sioux City–Le Mars, IA-NE-SD CSA | 171,435; 132,346 (IA) | Sioux City, IA-NE-SD MSA | 145,738; 106,649 (IA) | Dakota County, Nebraska | 21,687 |
| Sioux City–Le Mars, IA-NE-SD CSA | 171,435; 132,346 (IA) | Sioux City, IA-NE-SD MSA | 145,738; 106,649 (IA) | Union County, South Dakota | 17,402 |
| Sioux City–Le Mars, IA-NE-SD CSA | 171,435; 132,346 (IA) | Le Mars, IA μSA | 25,697 | Plymouth County, Iowa | 25,697 |
| Omaha–Fremont, NE-IA CSA | 1,047,893; 122,412 (IA) | Omaha, NE-IA MSA | 1,009,836; 122,412 (IA) | Douglas County, Nebraska | 606,460 |
| Omaha–Fremont, NE-IA CSA | 1,047,893; 122,412 (IA) | Omaha, NE-IA MSA | 1,009,836; 122,412 (IA) | Sarpy County, Nebraska | 208,303 |
| Omaha–Fremont, NE-IA CSA | 1,047,893; 122,412 (IA) | Omaha, NE-IA MSA | 1,009,836; 122,412 (IA) | Pottawattamie County, Iowa | 92,996 |
| Omaha–Fremont, NE-IA CSA | 1,047,893; 122,412 (IA) | Omaha, NE-IA MSA | 1,009,836; 122,412 (IA) | Cass County, Nebraska | 27,657 |
| Omaha–Fremont, NE-IA CSA | 1,047,893; 122,412 (IA) | Omaha, NE-IA MSA | 1,009,836; 122,412 (IA) | Saunders County, Nebraska | 23,702 |
| Omaha–Fremont, NE-IA CSA | 1,047,893; 122,412 (IA) | Omaha, NE-IA MSA | 1,009,836; 122,412 (IA) | Washington County, Nebraska | 21,302 |
| Omaha–Fremont, NE-IA CSA | 1,047,893; 122,412 (IA) | Omaha, NE-IA MSA | 1,009,836; 122,412 (IA) | Mills County, Iowa | 14,793 |
| Omaha–Fremont, NE-IA CSA | 1,047,893; 122,412 (IA) | Omaha, NE-IA MSA | 1,009,836; 122,412 (IA) | Harrison County, Iowa | 14,623 |
| Omaha–Fremont, NE-IA CSA | 1,047,893; 122,412 (IA) | Fremont, NE μSA | 38,057 | Dodge County, Nebraska | 38,057 |
| none | | Dubuque, IA MSA | 99,381 | Dubuque County, Iowa | 99,381 |
| Burlington–Fort Madison, IA-IL CSA | 76,367; 70,383 (IA) | Burlington, IA-IL μSA | 44,061; 38,077 (IA) | Des Moines County, Iowa | 38,077 |
| Burlington–Fort Madison, IA-IL CSA | 76,367; 70,383 (IA) | Burlington, IA-IL μSA | 44,061; 38,077 (IA) | Henderson County, Illinois | 5,984 |
| Burlington–Fort Madison, IA-IL CSA | 76,367; 70,383 (IA) | Fort Madison, IA μSA | 32,306 | Lee County, Iowa | 32,306 |
| none | | Mason City, IA μSA | 49,710 | Cerro Gordo County, Iowa | 42,372 |
| none | | Mason City, IA μSA | 49,710 | Worth County, Iowa | 7,338 |
| none | | Marshalltown, IA μSA | 39,890 | Marshall County, Iowa | 39,890 |
| none | | Fort Dodge, IA μSA | 36,838 | Webster County, Iowa | 36,838 |
| none | | Ottumwa, IA μSA | 35,210 | Wapello County, Iowa | 35,210 |
| Spencer–Spirit Lake, IA CSA | 34,279 | Spirit Lake, IA μSA | 18,077 | Dickinson County, Iowa | 18,077 |
| Spencer–Spirit Lake, IA CSA | 34,279 | Spencer, IA μSA | 16,202 | Clay County, Iowa | 16,202 |
| none | | Storm Lake, IA μSA | 20,449 | Buena Vista County, Iowa | 20,449 |
| none | | Carroll, IA μSA | 20,303 | Carroll County, Iowa | 20,303 |
| none | | none | | Sioux County, Iowa | 36,774 |
| none | | none | | Buchanan County, Iowa | 20,883 |
| none | | none | | Winneshiek County, Iowa | 19,733 |
| none | | none | | Henry County, Iowa | 19,349 |
| none | | none | | Jackson County, Iowa | 19,288 |
| none | | none | | Fayette County, Iowa | 19,047 |
| none | | none | | Poweshiek County, Iowa | 18,368 |
| none | | none | | Cedar County, Iowa | 18,359 |
| none | | none | | Delaware County, Iowa | 17,674 |
| none | | none | | Clayton County, Iowa | 16,845 |
| none | | none | | Tama County, Iowa | 16,796 |
| none | | none | | Iowa County, Iowa | 16,504 |
| none | | none | | Hardin County, Iowa | 16,455 |
| none | | none | | Crawford County, Iowa | 16,237 |
| none | | none | | Jefferson County, Iowa | 15,291 |
| none | | none | | Hamilton County, Iowa | 14,944 |
| none | | none | | Floyd County, Iowa | 14,901 |
| none | | none | | Page County, Iowa | 14,856 |
| none | | none | | Kossuth County, Iowa | 14,322 |
| none | | none | | Allamakee County, Iowa | 14,238 |
| none | | none | | O'Brien County, Iowa | 14,220 |
| none | | none | | Butler County, Iowa | 14,049 |
| none | | none | | Cass County, Iowa | 12,960 |
| none | | none | | Wright County, Iowa | 12,801 |
| none | | none | | Lyon County, Iowa | 12,354 |
| none | | none | | Appanoose County, Iowa | 12,077 |
| none | | none | | Union County, Iowa | 11,829 |
| none | | none | | Shelby County, Iowa | 11,689 |
| none | | none | | Chickasaw County, Iowa | 11,663 |
| none | | none | | Cherokee County, Iowa | 11,369 |
| none | | none | | Mitchell County, Iowa | 10,650 |
| none | | none | | Hancock County, Iowa | 10,528 |
| none | | none | | Louisa County, Iowa | 10,416 |
| none | | none | | Winnebago County, Iowa | 10,251 |
| none | | none | | Montgomery County, Iowa | 10,002 |
| none | | none | | Franklin County, Iowa | 9,868 |
| none | | none | | Keokuk County, Iowa | 9,797 |
| none | | none | | Clarke County, Iowa | 9,574 |
| none | | none | | Calhoun County, Iowa | 9,562 |
| none | | none | | Sac County, Iowa | 9,525 |
| none | | none | | Howard County, Iowa | 9,415 |
| none | | none | | Humboldt County, Iowa | 9,409 |
| none | | none | | Davis County, Iowa | 9,230 |
| none | | none | | Emmet County, Iowa | 9,107 |
| none | | none | | Palo Alto County, Iowa | 8,899 |
| none | | none | | Lucas County, Iowa | 8,847 |
| none | | none | | Greene County, Iowa | 8,658 |
| none | | none | | Monona County, Iowa | 8,539 |
| none | | none | | Decatur County, Iowa | 7,655 |
| none | | none | | Monroe County, Iowa | 7,406 |
| none | | none | | Adair County, Iowa | 7,403 |
| none | | none | | Van Buren County, Iowa | 7,131 |
| none | | none | | Pocahontas County, Iowa | 6,819 |
| none | | none | | Ida County, Iowa | 6,777 |
| none | | none | | Wayne County, Iowa | 6,738 |
| none | | none | | Fremont County, Iowa | 6,522 |
| none | | none | | Osceola County, Iowa | 5,980 |
| none | | none | | Taylor County, Iowa | 5,835 |
| none | | none | | Audubon County, Iowa | 5,509 |
| none | | none | | Ringgold County, Iowa | 4,642 |
| none | | none | | Adams County, Iowa | 3,617 |
| State of Iowa | | | | | 3,238,387 |

The 24 core-based statistical areas of the State of Iowa (Note: For CBSAs comprising populations from multiple states, they are listed twice to show both their intrastate population within that CBSA as well as the CBSA's total population. Only the intrastate population is ranked.)
| 2025 rank | Core-based statistical area | Population | | | | |
| 2025 rank | Core-based statistical area | 2025 estimate | Change | 2020 Census | Change | 2010 Census |
|---|---|---|---|---|---|---|
| 1 | Des Moines–West Des Moines, IA MSA | 758,539 | +6.92% | 709,466 | +16.98% | 606,475 |
| 2 | Cedar Rapids, IA MSA | 279,285 | +1.00% | 276,520 | +7.20% | 257,940 |
| 3 | Iowa City, IA MSA | 182,711 | +4.16% | 175,419 | +14.96% | 152,586 |
| 4 | Davenport–Moline–Rock Island, IA-IL MSA (IA) | 175,259 | +0.34% | 174,669 | +5.72% | 165,224 |
| 5 | Waterloo–Cedar Falls, IA MSA | 169,189 | +0.43% | 168,461 | +0.38% | 167,819 |
| 6 | Ames, IA MSA | 128,090 | +2.27% | 125,252 | +8.12% | 115,848 |
| 7 | Omaha, NE-IA MSA (IA) | 122,412 | −0.26% | 122,733 | −0.33% | 123,145 |
| 8 | Sioux City, IA-NE-SD MSA (IA) | 106,649 | +0.67% | 105,941 | +3.69% | 102,172 |
| 9 | Dubuque, IA MSA | 99,381 | +0.12% | 99,266 | +5.99% | 93,653 |
| 10 | Mason City, IA μSA | 49,710 | −1.70% | 50,570 | −2.28% | 51,749 |
| 11 | Clinton, IA μSA | 46,002 | −0.99% | 46,460 | −5.41% | 49,116 |
| 12 | Muscatine, IA μSA | 41,853 | −3.20% | 43,235 | +1.15% | 42,745 |
| 13 | Marshalltown, IA μSA | 39,890 | −0.54% | 40,105 | −1.34% | 40,648 |
| 14 | Burlington, IA-IL μSA (IA) | 38,077 | −2.14% | 38,910 | −3.51% | 40,325 |
| 15 | Fort Dodge, IA μSA | 36,838 | −0.44% | 36,999 | −2.67% | 38,013 |
| 16 | Ottumwa, IA μSA | 35,210 | −0.64% | 35,437 | −0.53% | 35,625 |
| 17 | Pella, IA μSA | 34,192 | +2.33% | 33,414 | +0.32% | 33,309 |
| 18 | Fort Madison, IA μSA | 32,306 | −3.72% | 33,555 | −6.43% | 35,862 |
| 19 | Le Mars, IA μSA | 25,697 | 0.00% | 25,698 | +2.85% | 24,986 |
| 20 | Oskaloosa, IA μSA | 21,880 | −1.40% | 22,190 | −0.85% | 22,381 |
| 21 | Storm Lake, IA μSA | 20,449 | −1.80% | 20,823 | +2.78% | 20,260 |
| 22 | Carroll, IA μSA | 20,303 | −2.20% | 20,760 | −0.27% | 20,816 |
| 23 | Spirit Lake, IA μSA | 18,077 | +2.11% | 17,703 | +6.22% | 16,667 |
| 24 | Spencer, IA μSA | 16,202 | −1.11% | 16,384 | −1.70% | 16,667 |
| | Burlington, IA-IL μSA | 44,061 | −2.73% | 45,297 | −4.95% | 47,656 |
| | Davenport–Moline–Rock Island, IA-IL MSA | 380,452 | −1.01% | 384,324 | +1.49% | 378,666 |
| | Omaha, NE-IA MSA | 1,009,836 | +4.36% | 967,604 | +11.82% | 865,350 |
| | Sioux City, IA-NE-SD MSA | 145,738 | +0.97% | 144,334 | +4.91% | 137,577 |

The seven combined statistical areas of the State of Iowa (Note: For CSAs comprising populations from multiple states, they are listed twice to show both their intrastate population within that CSA as well as the CSA's total population. Only the intrastate population is ranked.)
| 2025 rank | Combined statistical area | Population | | | | |
| 2025 rank | Combined statistical area | 2025 estimate | Change | 2020 Census | Change | 2010 Census |
|---|---|---|---|---|---|---|
| 1 | Des Moines–West Des Moines–Ames, IA CSA | 942,701 | +5.88% | 890,322 | +14.44% | 778,013 |
| 2 | Cedar Rapids–Iowa City, IA CSA | 461,996 | +2.23% | 451,939 | +10.09% | 410,526 |
| 3 | Davenport–Moline, IA-IL CSA (IA) | 263,114 | −0.47% | 264,364 | +2.83% | 257,085 |
| 4 | Sioux City–Le Mars, IA-NE-SD CSA (IA) | 132,346 | +0.54% | 131,639 | +3.52% | 127,158 |
| 5 | Omaha–Fremont, NE-IA CSA (IA) | 122,412 | −0.26% | 122,733 | −0.33% | 123,145 |
| 6 | Burlington–Fort Madison, IA-IL CSA (IA) | 70,383 | −2.87% | 72,465 | −4.89% | 76,187 |
| 7 | Spencer–Spirit Lake, IA CSA | 34,279 | +0.56% | 34,087 | +2.26% | 33,334 |
| | Burlington–Fort Madison, IA-IL CSA | 76,367 | −3.15% | 78,852 | −5.59% | 83,518 |
| | Davenport–Moline, IA-IL CSA | 468,307 | −1.21% | 474,019 | +0.74% | 470,527 |
| | Omaha–Fremont, NE-IA CSA | 1,047,893 | +4.29% | 1,004,771 | +11.39% | 902,041 |
| | Sioux City–Le Mars, IA-NE-SD CSA | 171,435 | +0.83% | 170,032 | +4.59% | 162,563 |

== See also ==
- Geography of Iowa
  - Demographics of Iowa
