= Mason City Municipal Airport =

Airport in Iowa, USA

- IATA: MCW; ICAO: KMCW; FAA LID: MCW

Summary
- Airport type: Public
- Owner: City of Mason City
- Serves: Mason City, Iowa
- Elevation AMSL: 1,214 ft (370 m)
- Coordinates: 43°09′28″N 093°19′52″W
- Public transit access: Jefferson Lines
- Website: www.FlyMCW.com

Maps
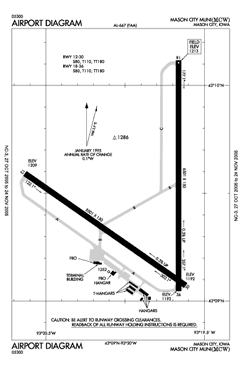
- FAA airport diagram

- Location within Iowa Location within the United States

Runways
Direction	Length		Surface
Direction	ft	m	Surface
18/36	6,501	1,982	Asphalt
12/30	5,502	1,677	Asphalt

Statistics
- Aircraft operations (2020): 33,600
- Based aircraft (2022): 51
- Departing passengers (12 months ending July 2025): 8,298
- Source: Federal Aviation Administration

Mason City Municipal Airport (IATA: MCW, ICAO: KMCW, FAA LID: MCW) is located six miles west of downtown Mason City, in Cerro Gordo County, Iowa, United States. It is in the northern part of Lake Township, just east of the city of Clear Lake. It is used for general aviation and has airline service subsidized through the Essential Air Service (EAS) program.

The National Plan of Integrated Airport Systems for 2021–2025 categorized it as a non-primary commercial service airport.

== History ==
On February 2, 1942 Mason City decided to build a new airport and purchased 312 acres several miles west of the city. The new Mason City Municipal Airport saw its first official landing on March 29, 1945. The airport had two paved runways, associated taxiways, and a small ramp area. A remodeled farmhouse was used as the first terminal during the dedication on June 22, 1946.

Airline flights began in 1946, on Mid-Continent; successor Braniff left in 1959. Ozark started in 1955 and pulled out in 1983. They now have daily flights to and from Chicago (KORD) through Skywest by United Airlines on CRJ-200's.

A new commercial service terminal building was constructed and opened July 31, 2024. The new 23,000 square foot terminal replaced the existing terminal constructed in 1966.

Musicians Buddy Holly, Ritchie Valens, and J.P. "The Big Bopper" Richardson, along with pilot Roger Peterson, died in a plane crash after taking off from Mason City Municipal Airport in the early morning hours of February 3, 1959, after a concert at the Surf Ballroom in nearby Clear Lake. This event is not commemorated anywhere on the airport grounds; a private monument is near the crash site.

== Facilities ==
The airport covers 1,103 acres (446 ha) at an elevation of 1,214 feet (370 m). It has two asphalt runways: 18/36 is 6,501 by 150 feet (1,982 x 46 m) and 12/30 is 5,502 by 150 feet (1,677 x 46 m).

In the year ending June 30, 2020 the airport had 33,600 aircraft operations, an average of 92 per day: 90% general aviation, 10% air taxi and less than 1% military. In April 2022, there were 51 aircraft based at this airport: 46 single-engine, 2 multi-engine, 2 jet and 1 helicopter.

North Iowa Air Service (NIAS) is a full service Field Based Operation (FBO) That includes full service fueling, flight planning, pilots lounge, kitchen, internet workspace, restrooms, showers, Wi-Fi, aircraft parking, aircraft rentals, courtesy cars, limo service, oxygen, pilot supplies, rental cars, hangar space, maintenance, along with Charter Flights, lavatory service, de-icing,

== Federal grants ==
In 2005 the airport was awarded a $4,559,986 federal grant to rehabilitate a runway and relocate a localizer out of a runway safety area.

In 2007 the airport received a $1 million federal grant to help purchase a perimeter fence around its runways.

In 2009 the airport commission received a $820,916 federal grant to rehabilitate the airport's parking lot and for a Master Abstract Title Opinion study for the airport.

In 2010 the airport received $24,463 in federal funding for runway incursion markings.

A 2011 federal grant provided $115,865 for apron rehabilitation.

In 2012 the airport received a federal grant of $886,604 for the rehabilitation of its parking lot pavement.

A 2013 federal grant paid for $540,000 of snow removal equipment for the airport.

In 2014 the airport was awarded $601,317 in federal grants for improvements to its infrastructure.

In 2021 the airport was awarded over $1,215,000 in federal grants for a new terminal to accommodate incoming airline traffic for Mason City Municipal Airport.

== Airline and destinations ==
SkyWest Airlines, operating as United Express, started service from Mason City to Chicago O'Hare International Airport on March 1, 2021. Earlier, Mason City had airline service on Air Choice One, Great Lakes Airlines and Mesaba Airlines.

Airlines	Destinations
United Express	Chicago–O'Hare

=== Statistics ===
Carrier shares (January - December 2025)
Carrier	Passengers (arriving and departing)
SkyWest Airlines	17,470(100%)

Top domestic destinations from MCW (January - December 2025)
Rank	Airport	Passengers
1	Chicago-O'Hare, Illinois	8,750

== Incidents ==
- On August 22, 1954 Braniff Airlines Flight 4630, a Douglas DC-3, crashed south of Mason City Municipal Airport after departing Waterloo Regional Airport in nearby Waterloo. The aircraft crashed after entering a thunderstorm at a low altitude. 12 of 19 passengers died.
- In the early morning hours of February 3, 1959 (also known as 'the day the music died'), following a concert at the Surf Ballroom in nearby Clear Lake, musicians Buddy Holly, Ritchie Valens and J.P. "The Big Bopper" Richardson, along with pilot Roger Peterson, died after the Beechcraft Bonanza, (Aircraft registration number N3794N), they were flying in crashed after taking off from the Mason City Municipal Airport.

== Ground transportation ==
Mason City Municipal Airport is served by Jefferson Lines intercity buses. The local transit agency Mason City Transit does not serve the airport.

== See also ==
- List of airports in Iowa

== Other sources ==
- Essential Air Service documents (Docket OST-2001-10684) from the U.S. Department of Transportation:
  - Order 2005-6-13 (June 20, 2005): selecting Mesaba Aviation, Inc. d/b/a Northwest Airlink, an affiliate of Northwest Airlines, to provide subsidized essential air service (EAS) for the two-year period beginning June 1, 2005, at an annual subsidy of $777,709 for Thief River Falls and a combined annual subsidy of $2,160,770 for Fort Dodge and Mason City.
  - Order 2007-6-3 (June 11, 2007): re-selecting Mesaba Aviation Inc., d/b/a Northwest Airlink (Mesaba), to continue to provide subsidized essential air service (EAS) at Fort Dodge and Mason City, Iowa, and Thief River Falls, Minnesota, for the two-year period beginning June 1, 2007. Service will consist of 18 round trips per week at Fort Dodge and Mason City, routed Fort Dodge-Mason City-Minneapolis/St. Paul, at the combined annual subsidy rate of $21,113,865. Service at Thief River Falls will consist of 12 one-stop round trips per week to Minneapolis/St. Paul at the annual subsidy rate of $1,065,639. All service will be provided with 34-seat Saab 340 aircraft as Northwest Airlink.
  - Order 2009-4-20 (April 27, 2009): re-selecting Mesaba Aviation, Inc., d/b/a Delta Connection (Mesaba), to continue providing subsidized essential air service (EAS) at Fort Dodge and Mason City, IA, and Thief River Falls, MN, for the two-year period beginning June 1, 2009, at the annual subsidy rates of $2,225,213 for Fort Dodge and Mason City, and $1,230,322 for Thief River Falls.
  - Order 2011-6-7 (June 8, 2011): re-selecting Mesaba Aviation, Inc., d/b/a Delta Connection (Mesaba), to provide essential air service (EAS) at Fort Dodge and Mason City, Iowa, at annual subsidy rates of $1,910,995 and $1,017,545 at Mason City, respectively, for the five-month period June 1, 2011, through October 31, 2011.
  - Order 2011-11-30 (November 23, 2011): selecting Great Lakes Aviation, Ltd., to provide essential air service (EAS) at six communities at the following annual subsidy rates: Brainerd, Minnesota, $959,865; Fort Dodge, $1,798,693; Iron Mountain, $1,707,841; Mason City, $1,174,468; Thief River Falls, Minnesota, $1,881,815; and Watertown, $1,710,324, for the two-year period beginning when Great Lakes inaugurates full EAS at all six communities
  - Great Lakes Airlines press release (January 27, 2014): Effective February 1, 2014, Great Lakes Airlines will be suspending service from Devils Lake and Jamestown, ND; Fort Dodge and Mason City, IA; Ironwood, MI; and Thief River Falls, MN due to the severe industry-wide pilot shortage and its relative acute impact on Great Lakes.
  - Order 2014-1-20 (January 31, 2014): requesting proposals from carriers interested in providing Essential Air Service (EAS) at Fort Dodge and/or Mason City, Iowa. The communities will be without air service effective February 1, 2014.
