= Cerro Gordo County Courthouse (Iowa) =

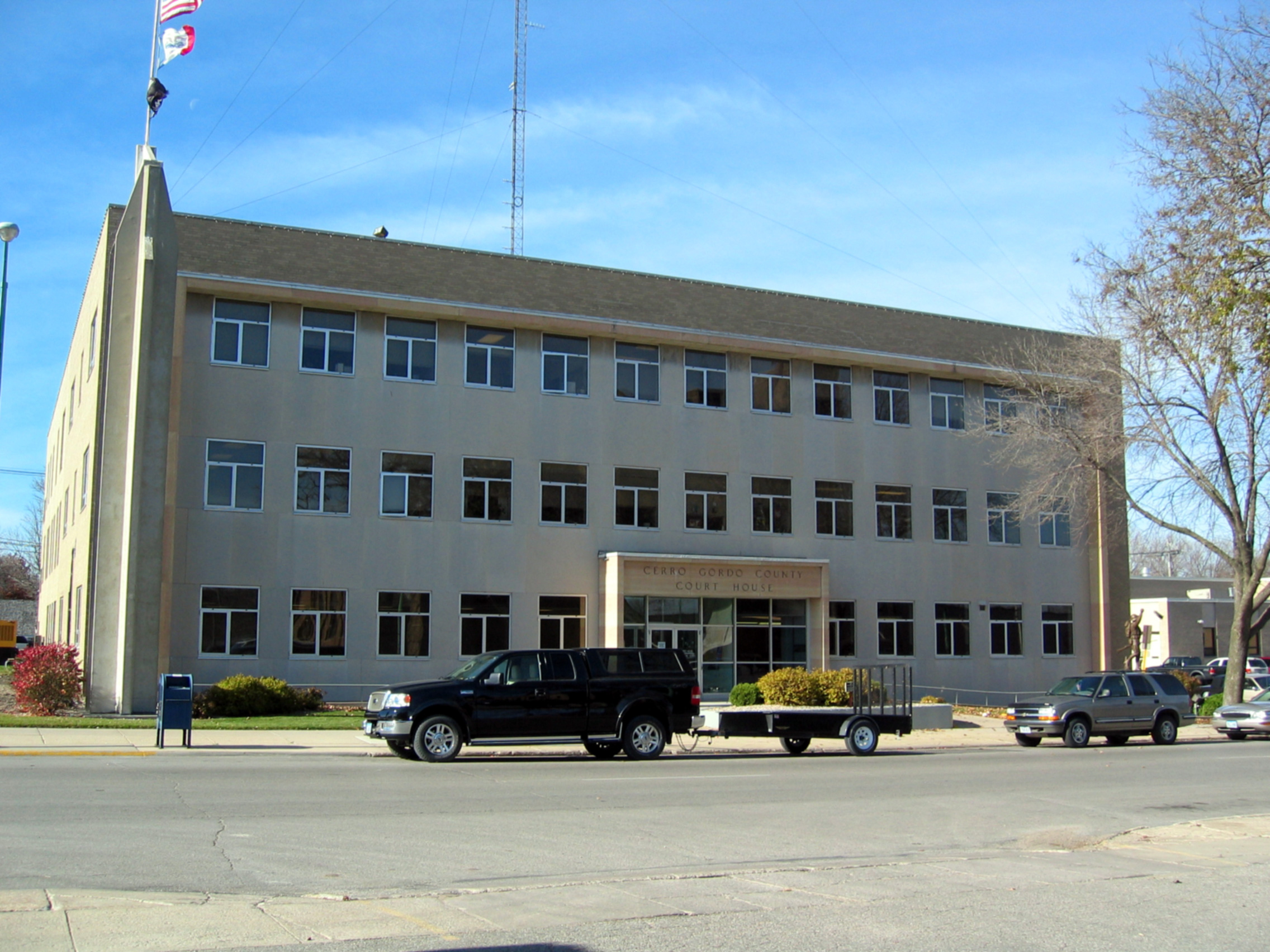
- Cerro Gordo County Courthouse

General information
- Type: Courthouse
- Architectural style: Modern
- Location: 220 N. Washington Ave., Mason City, Iowa, United States
- Coordinates: 43.154250°N 93.203170°W

Technical details
- Floor count: Three

Other information
- Public transit: Mason City Transit

The Cerro Gordo County Courthouse is located in Mason City, Iowa, United States. The courthouse is the fourth structure to house court functions and county administration.

== History ==
When Cerro Gordo County was created in 1855 Mason City was selected to be the county seat. Dissatisfaction in the western part of the county led the Iowa General Assembly to appoint three new commissioners who would move the county seat to a new townsite that they called Livonia, which was a small town that was located near Clear Lake. A courthouse was built there, and some of the county records were moved in the winter of 1857. County officials reluctantly followed. A petition signed by over half of the citizens of the county requested that the county seat be moved back to Mason City, and it was the first business before the court. Mason City won a referendum in 1858 to decide the matter, 155–48. There is nothing left in what was Livonia to remind people of its brief existence.

Two courthouses have stood in Mason City prior to the present Modernist structure that was occupied by the county in 1960. The first was located across the street from Central Park. The courtroom was on the second floor, while the first floor housed various county offices. By 1880 the county had outgrown the building and plans were made to construct a new one. Referendums to build it were defeated in 1880, 1881, and 1882. Concerns were raised over the security of county records as the building became dilapidated. Construction for the large Bedford stone courthouse would not begin until 1899. The two-story Romanesque Revival-style structure was built over a raised basement. It featured a central clock tower and was completed for $64,000. The security of county records again became an issue by the late 1950s. A new courthouse was expected to cost $1.5 million. The county decided to save money and acquired the Standard Oil Building in 1959 for $159,400. They remodeled it for their use and added an addition using the remainder of the $750,000 bond issue.
