= Clear Lake High School (Iowa) =

Public secondary school in Clear Lake, Iowa, United States

Location
- 125 North 20th Street; Clear Lake, Iowa 50428; United States; 43°08′24″N 93°21′58″W

Information
- Type: Public
- School district: Clear Lake Community School District
- Superintendent: Doug Gee
- Principal: Chris Murphy
- Teaching staff: 29.70 (FTE)
- Grades: 9-12
- Enrollment: 458 (2022-23)
- Student to teacher ratio: 15.42
- Colors: Black and Gold
- Athletics conference: North Central
- Nickname: Lions
- Website: CLHS

Clear Lake High School is a rural public high school in the Clear Lake Community School District. It is within the city of Clear Lake, Iowa. It is located in Cerro Gordo County. The school colors are black and gold and the mascot is a lion.

== Extracurricular activities ==
- Model United Nations
- Mock Trial
- Speech Contest
- National Honor Society
- Jazz Band
- Dance Team

== Athletics ==
The Lions compete in the North Central Conference in the following sports:
Fall:

- Cross Country
- Cheerleading
- Football
  - 2000 Class 3A State Champions
- Volleyball
- Dance Team

Winter:

- Wrestling
- Basketball
- Cheerleading
- Dance Team

Spring:

- Golf
  - Boys' 6-time Class 3A State Champions (1993, 1998, 2004, 2005, 2006, 2011)
  - Girls' 2-time Class 3A State Champions (2010, 2012)
  - Coed 3-time Class 1A State Champions (2009, 2010, 2013)
- Soccer
- Tennis
- Track & Field
- Dance Team

Summer:

- Baseball
  - 3-time State Champions (2013, 2015, 2016)
- Softball

== See also ==
- List of high schools in Iowa

== Notable alumni ==
- Jared Penning, NFL offensive guard for the Baltimore Ravens
