= Burchinal =

Burchinal may refer to:

- Burchinal, Iowa, USA
- David A. Burchinal (1915-1990), American general
