= Geneseo Township, Cerro Gordo County, Iowa =

Township in Iowa, US

Geneseo Township, Cerro Gordo County
- Township
- Coordinates: 42°57′06″N 093°12′11″W
- Country: United States
- State: Iowa
- County: Cerro Gordo

Area
  - Total: 36.02 sq mi (93.28 km^{2})
  - Land: 36.00 sq mi (93.23 km^{2})
  - Water: 0.023 sq mi (0.06 km^{2})
- Elevation: 1,073 ft (327 m)

Population (2000)
  - Total: 1,206
  - Density: 33/sq mi (12.9/km^{2})
- FIPS code: 19-91551
- GNIS feature ID: 0467904

Geneseo Township is one of sixteen townships in Cerro Gordo County, Iowa, United States. As of the 2000 census, its population was 1,206.

== Geography ==
Geneseo Township covers an area of 36.02 square miles (93.29 km^{2}) and contains one incorporated settlement, Rockwell. According to the USGS, it contains two cemeteries: Linn Grove and Sacred Heart. The city of Sheffield borders it to the south.
