= Wheelerwood, Iowa =

- Unincorporated community
- Location within Iowa
- Coordinates: 43°14′30″N 93°03′51″W
- Country: United States
- State: Iowa
- County: Cerro Gordo
- Elevation: 1,181 ft (360 m)
- Time zone: UTC-6 (Central (CST))
  - Summer (DST): UTC-5 (CDT)
- Area code: 641
- GNIS feature ID: 464074

Wheelerwood is an American unincorporated community and de facto ghost town in Cerro Gordo County, Iowa.

== History ==
Wheelerwood contained a post office from 1900 until 1906. The community was named for J. S. Wheeler, a local landowner.

Wheelerwood's population was 41 in 1925. The population was 35 in 1940.
