= Pleasant Valley Township, Cerro Gordo County, Iowa =

Township in Iowa, US

Pleasant Valley Township, Cerro Gordo County
- Township
- Coordinates: 42°57′03″N 093°19′19″W
- Country: United States
- State: Iowa
- County: Cerro Gordo

Area
  - Total: 35.9 sq mi (93.1 km^{2})
  - Land: 35.94 sq mi (93.09 km^{2})
  - Water: 0.0077 sq mi (0.02 km^{2})
- Elevation: 1,188 ft (362 m)

Population (2000)
  - Total: 494
  - Density: 14/sq mi (5.3/km^{2})
- FIPS code: 19-93408
- GNIS feature ID: 0468544

Pleasant Valley Township is one of sixteen townships in Cerro Gordo County, Iowa, United States. As of the 2000 census, its population was 494.

== Geography ==
Pleasant Valley Township covers an area of 35.95 square miles (93.1 km^{2}) and contains one incorporated settlement, Swaledale, and part of another, Thornton (which lies mostly in Grimes Township to the west). According to the USGS, it contains two cemeteries: Pleasant Valley Township and Richland Lutheran.
