= Cartersville, Iowa =

- Unincorporated community
- Location within Iowa
- Coordinates: 42°59′40″N 93°04′59″W
- Country: United States
- State: Iowa
- County: Cerro Gordo
- Elevation: 1,178 ft (359 m)
- Time zone: UTC-6 (Central (CST))
  - Summer (DST): UTC-5 (CDT)
- Area code: 641
- GNIS feature ID: 455193

Cartersville is an unincorporated community in Cerro Gordo County, in the U.S. state of Iowa.

== History ==
A post office was established at Cartersville in 1900, and remained in operation until it was discontinued in 1943. The community was named after the novel Col. Carter of Cartersville by Francis Hopkinson Smith.

The population was 50 in 1940.
