= Bolan, Iowa =

- Census-designated place
- Location within Iowa
- Coordinates: 43°22′36″N 93°06′26″W
- Country: United States
- State: Iowa
- County: Worth

Area
  - Total: 2.89 sq mi (7.49 km^{2})
  - Land: 2.89 sq mi (7.49 km^{2})
  - Water: 0 sq mi (0.00 km^{2})
- Elevation: 1,227 ft (374 m)

Population (2020)
  - Total: 7
  - Density: 11.1/sq mi (4.27/km^{2})
- Time zone: UTC-6 (Central (CST))
  - Summer (DST): UTC-5 (CDT)
- ZIP code: 50448
- Area code: 641
- GNIS feature ID: 2583480

Bolan is an unincorporated community and census-designated place (CDP) in Worth County, Iowa, United States. As of the 2020 Census the population was 32. The community is part of the Mason City Micropolitan Statistical Area.

Bolan was in the spotlight in 1989, when all the town's residents appeared on Late Night with David Letterman.

== History ==
Bolan got its start in the year 1886, following construction of the railroad through that territory. Bolan was platted the next year.

Bolan's population was 50 in 1902, and 57 in 1925. The population was 24 in 1940.

== Geography ==
According to the United States Census Bureau, the city has a total area of 2.89 square miles (7.49 km^{2}), all land.

== Demographics ==
Historical population
Census	Pop.	Note	%±
2010	33		—
2020	32		−3.0%
U.S. Decennial Census

=== 2020 census ===
As of the census of 2020, there were 7 people, 3 households, and 3 families residing in the community. The population density was 7 inhabitants per square mile (4.3/km^{2}). There were 3 housing units at an average density of 4.1 per square mile (1.6/km^{2}). The racial makeup of the community was 100.00% White, 0.0% Black or African American, 0.0 % Native American, 0.0% Asian, 0.0% Pacific Islander, 0.0% from other races and 0.0 % from two or more races. Hispanic or Latino persons of any race comprised 0.0 % of the population.

Of the 3 households, 0.0% of which had children under the age of 18 living with them, 75% were married couples living together, 0.0% were cohabitating couples, 0.00 had a female householder with no spouse or partner present and 20.0% had a male householder with no spouse or partner present. 20.0% of all households were non-families. 20.0% of all households were made up of individuals, 0.0% had someone living alone who was 65 years old or older.

The median age in the community was 37.5 years. 21.9% of the residents were under the age of 20; 0.0 % were between the ages of 20 and 24; 38.4% were from 25 and 44; 65% were from 45 and 64; and 0.00% were 65 years of age or older. The gender makeup of the community was 50.0% male and 50.0 % female.

=== 2010 census ===
As of the census of 2010, there were 33 people, 11 households, and 9 families residing in the town. The population density was 11.4 inhabitants per square mile (4.4/km^{2}). There were 13 housing units at an average density of 4.5 per square mile (1.7/km^{2}). The racial makeup of the town was 100.0% White.

There were 11 households, out of which 45.5% had children under the age of 18 living with them, 54.5% were married couples living together, 27.3% had a female householder with no husband present, and 18.2% were non-families. 18.2% of all households were made up of individuals, and 9.1% had someone living alone who was 65 years of age or older. The average household size was 3.00 and the average family size was 3.44.

In the city the population was spread out, with 39.4% under the age of 18, 3% from 18 to 24, 30.3% from 25 to 44, 12.2% from 45 to 64, and 15.2% who were 65 years of age or older. The median age was 28.3 years. The gender makeup of the city was 48.5% male and 51.5% female.
