= Dougherty Township, Cerro Gordo County, Iowa =

Township in Iowa, US

Dougherty Township, Cerro Gordo County
- Township
- Coordinates: 42°57′08″N 093°05′12″W
- Country: United States
- State: Iowa
- County: Cerro Gordo

Area
  - Total: 35.96 sq mi (93.14 km^{2})
  - Land: 35.96 sq mi (93.14 km^{2})
  - Water: 0 sq mi (0 km^{2})
- Elevation: 1,129 ft (344 m)

Population (2000)
  - Total: 275
  - Density: 7.8/sq mi (3/km^{2})
- FIPS code: 19-91017
- GNIS feature ID: 0467721

Dougherty Township is one of sixteen townships in Cerro Gordo County, Iowa, United States. As of the 2000 census, its population was 275.

== History ==
Dougherty Township was named for Daniel Dougherty, an early prominent resident.

== Geography ==
Dougherty Township covers an area of 35.96 square miles (93.1 km^{2}) and contains one incorporated settlement, Dougherty. According to the USGS, it contains one cemetery, Saint Patricks Catholic.
