= Swaledale, Iowa =

- City
- Location of Swaledale, Iowa
- Coordinates: 42°58′35″N 93°18′56″W
- Country: United States
- State: Iowa
- County: Cerro Gordo
- Incorporated: March 31, 1892

Area
  - Total: 0.25 sq mi (0.64 km^{2})
  - Land: 0.25 sq mi (0.64 km^{2})
  - Water: 0 sq mi (0.00 km^{2})
- Elevation: 1,148 ft (350 m)

Population (2020)
  - Total: 144
  - Density: 578.4/sq mi (223.31/km^{2})
- Time zone: UTC-6 (Central (CST))
  - Summer (DST): UTC-5 (CDT)
- ZIP code: 50477
- Area code: 641
- FIPS code: 19-76620
- GNIS feature ID: 2396012

Swaledale is a city in Cerro Gordo County, Iowa, United States. The population was 144 at the time of the 2020 census. It is part of the Mason City Micropolitan Statistical Area.

== Geography ==
According to the United States Census Bureau, the city has a total area of 0.25 square miles (0.65 km^{2}), all land.

== Demographics ==
Historical populations
Year	Pop.	±%
1900	240	—
1910	235	−2.1%
1920	200	−14.9%
1930	178	−11.0%
1940	204	+14.6%
1950	205	+0.5%
1960	217	+5.9%
1970	222	+2.3%
1980	186	−16.2%
1990	190	+2.2%
2000	174	−8.4%
2010	165	−5.2%
2020	144	−12.7%
Source:"U.S. Census website". United States Census Bureau. and Iowa Data Center; Source: U.S. Decennial Census

=== 2020 census ===
As of the census of 2020, there were 144 people, 81 households, and 44 families residing in the city. The population density was 578.4 inhabitants per square mile (223.3/km^{2}). There were 82 housing units at an average density of 329.3 per square mile (127.2/km^{2}). The racial makeup of the city was 98.6% White, 0.0% Black or African American, 0.0% Native American, 1.4% Asian, 0.0% Pacific Islander, 0.0% from other races and 0.0% from two or more races. Hispanic or Latino persons of any race comprised 0.0% of the population.

Of the 81 households, 28.4% of which had children under the age of 18 living with them, 32.1% were married couples living together, 9.9% were cohabitating couples, 29.6% had a female householder with no spouse or partner present and 28.4% had a male householder with no spouse or partner present. 45.7% of all households were non-families. 39.5% of all households were made up of individuals, 24.7% had someone living alone who was 65 years old or older.

The median age in the city was 53.3 years. 18.8% of the residents were under the age of 20; 4.2% were between the ages of 20 and 24; 18.1% were from 25 and 44; 31.2% were from 45 and 64; and 27.8% were 65 years of age or older. The gender makeup of the city was 50.0% male and 50.0% female.

=== 2010 census ===
As of the census of 2010, there were 165 people, 77 households, and 46 families living in the city. The population density was 660.0 inhabitants per square mile (254.8/km^{2}). There were 83 housing units at an average density of 332.0 per square mile (128.2/km^{2}). The racial makeup of the city was 97.6% White and 2.4% from other races. Hispanic or Latino of any race were 3.0% of the population.

There were 77 households, of which 22.1% had children under the age of 18 living with them, 50.6% were married couples living together, 6.5% had a female householder with no husband present, 2.6% had a male householder with no wife present, and 40.3% were non-families. 32.5% of all households were made up of individuals, and 15.6% had someone living alone who was 65 years of age or older. The average household size was 2.14 and the average family size was 2.76.

The median age in the city was 48.4 years. 20% of residents were under the age of 18; 3.6% were between the ages of 18 and 24; 22.5% were from 25 to 44; 29.7% were from 45 to 64; and 24.2% were 65 years of age or older. The gender makeup of the city was 49.7% male and 50.3% female.

=== 2000 census ===
As of the census of 2000, there were 174 people, 75 households, and 48 families living in the city. The population density was 682.9 inhabitants per square mile (263.7/km^{2}). There were 83 housing units at an average density of 325.8 per square mile (125.8/km^{2}). The racial makeup of the city was 100.00% White.

There were 75 households, out of which 29.3% had children under the age of 18 living with them, 57.3% were married couples living together, 4.0% had a female householder with no husband present, and 36.0% were non-families. 30.7% of all households were made up of individuals, and 17.3% had someone living alone who was 65 years of age or older. The average household size was 2.32 and the average family size was 2.96.

In the city, the population was spread out, with 24.7% under the age of 18, 10.9% from 18 to 24, 23.6% from 25 to 44, 20.7% from 45 to 64, and 20.1% who were 65 years of age or older. The median age was 38 years. For every 100 females, there were 95.5 males. For every 100 females age 18 and over, there were 104.7 males.

The median income for a household in the city was $28,906, and the median income for a family was $34,167. Males had a median income of $25,000 versus $17,917 for females. The per capita income for the city was $11,710. About 4.2% of families and 5.2% of the population were below the poverty line, including 9.4% of those under the age of eighteen and none of those 65 or over.

== Education ==
Swaledale is part of the West Fork Community School District, formed in 2011 by the merger of the Rockwell–Swaledale Community School District and the SCMT (Sheffield–Chapin–Meservey–Thornton) Community School District. The Rockwell–Swaledale district was formed in 1960 by the merger of the Rockwell Community School District and the Swaledale Community School District.

== Tom Drury ==
The Swaledale-born novelist Tom Drury (1956) remembered the place as more lively than it was in 2015: it had "a gas station, hair salon, grocery, grain elevator, hardware store, two taverns, three churches, eventually a library. Now there's an auto mechanic, a church and the library. The old hardware store is used to store doors." Even then it was an isolated place, and the bookmobile provided the first glimpse of different lives. In his first novel, The End of Vandalism, the depopulation of rural Iowa is an important theme: social and cultural erosion is visible in the novel's fine details.

== Notable residents ==
- Don Eddy, Major League Baseball pitcher for the Chicago White Sox from 1970 to 1971
- Tom Drury, author
