= Clear Lake Community School District =

Public school district in Clear Lake, Iowa, United States

Coordinates: 43.139774°N 93.368914°W

Location
- Clear Lake, Iowa Cerro Gordo County United States
- Coordinates: 43.139774, -93.368914

District information
- Type: Local school district
- Grades: K-12
- Superintendent: Ian Dye
- Schools: 3
- Budget: $22,035,000 (2020-21)
- NCES District ID: 1907620

Students and staff
- Students: 1495 (2022-23)
- Teachers: 97.57 FTE
- Staff: 118.42 FTE
- Student–teacher ratio: 15.32
- Athletic conference: North Central
- District mascot: Lions
- Colors: Black and Gold

Other information
- Website: www.clearlakeschools.org

The Clear Lake Community School District is a rural public school district that serves the majority of the town of Clear Lake, Iowa, and surrounding areas in Cerro Gordo County. The Burchinal census-designated place is in the district.

The school's mascot is the Lion. Their colors are black and gold.

== Schools ==
The district operates three schools, all in Clear Lake:

- Clear Lake Elementary School
- Clear Lake Middle School
- Clear Lake High School

== See also ==
- List of school districts in Iowa
