= Bath Township, Cerro Gordo County, Iowa =

Township in Iowa, US

Bath Township, Cerro Gordo County
- Township
- Coordinates: 43°02′21″N 093°12′13″W
- Country: United States
- State: Iowa
- County: Cerro Gordo

Area
  - Total: 36.6 sq mi (94.8 km^{2})
  - Land: 36.6 sq mi (94.8 km^{2})
  - Water: 0 sq mi (0 km^{2})
- Elevation: 1,161 ft (354 m)

Population (2000)
  - Total: 337
  - Density: 9.3/sq mi (3.6/km^{2})
- FIPS code: 19-90135
- GNIS feature ID: 0467417

Bath Township is one of sixteen townships in Cerro Gordo County, Iowa, United States. As of the 2000 census, its population was 337.

== Geography ==
Bath Township covers an area of 36.6 square miles (95 km^{2}), and contains no incorporated settlements. The city of Rockwell (population about 1000) borders it to the south. The southern part of the township to its north likewise remains unincorporated, while its northern portion includes most of Mason City, with a population of about 30,000. (Mason City was the childhood home of Meredith Willson, who is said to have modeled after it "River City, Iowa", the setting for his musical The Music Man.)
