= Grant Township, Cerro Gordo County, Iowa =

Township in Iowa, US

Grant Township, Cerro Gordo County
- Township
- Coordinates: 43°13′15″N 093°26′53″W
- Country: United States
- State: Iowa
- County: Cerro Gordo

Area
  - Total: 35.45 sq mi (91.81 km^{2})
  - Land: 35.36 sq mi (91.58 km^{2})
  - Water: 0.085 sq mi (0.22 km^{2})
- Elevation: 1,257 ft (383 m)

Population (2000)
  - Total: 354
  - Density: 10/sq mi (3.9/km^{2})
- FIPS code: 19-91641
- GNIS feature ID: 0467934

Grant Township is one of 16 townships in Cerro Gordo County, Iowa, United States. As of the 2000 census, its population was 354.

Grant Township was the site of the airplane crash north of the city of Clear Lake, in which rock and roll stars Buddy Holly, Ritchie Valens, and J.P. "The Big Bopper" Richardson, along with their pilot Roger A. Peterson, were killed on February 3, 1959. The site is located in the extreme eastern part of the township, near its border with Lincoln Township.

== Geography ==
Grant Township covers an area of 35.45 square miles (91.8 km^{2}) and contains no incorporated settlements. According to the USGS, it contains one cemetery, Grant. The city of Fertile borders it to the north.
