= Hanford, Iowa =

- Unincorporated community
- Location within Iowa
- Coordinates: 43°04′27″N 93°08′30″W
- Country: United States
- State: Iowa
- County: Cerro Gordo
- Elevation: 1,194 ft (364 m)
- Time zone: UTC-6 (Central (CST))
  - Summer (DST): UTC-5 (CDT)
- Area code: 641
- GNIS feature ID: 457228

Hanford is an unincorporated community in Cerro Gordo County, in the U.S. state of Iowa.

== History ==
A post office was established at Hanford in 1900, and remained in operation until it was discontinued in 1913. The community was named for Hanford McNider, the son of an Iowa banker.

Hanford's population was 22 in 1925. The population was 30 in 1940.
