= Worth County, Iowa =

County in Iowa, United States

- County
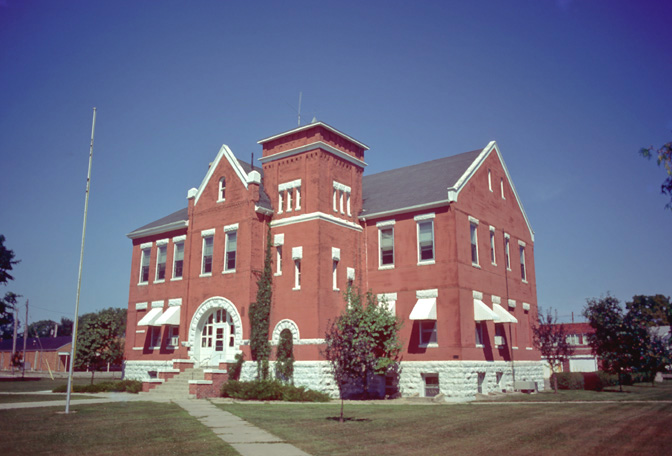
- The Worth County Courthouse in Northwood

- Location within the U.S. state of Iowa
- Coordinates: 43°22′44″N 93°15′26″W
- Country: United States
- State: Iowa
- Founded: 1851
- Named for: William Jenkins Worth
- Seat: Northwood
- Largest city: Northwood

Area
  - Total: 402 sq mi (1,040 km^{2})
  - Land: 400 sq mi (1,000 km^{2})
  - Water: 1.8 sq mi (4.7 km^{2}) 0.5%

Population (2020)
  - Total: 7,443
  - Estimate (2025): 7,338 ▼
  - Density: 19/sq mi (7.2/km^{2})
- Time zone: UTC−6 (Central)
  - Summer (DST): UTC−5 (CDT)
- Congressional district: 2nd
- Website: worthcountyiowa.gov
- Iowa county number 98

Worth County is a county located in the U.S. state of Iowa. As of the 2020 census, the population was 7,443. The county seat is Northwood. The county was founded in 1851 and named for Major General William Jenkins Worth (1794–1849), an officer in both the Seminole War and the Mexican–American War.

Worth County is part of the Mason City, IA Micropolitan Statistical Area.

== Geography ==
According to the United States Census Bureau, the county has a total area of 402 square miles (1,040 km^{2}), of which 400 square miles (1,000 km^{2}) is land and 1.8 square miles (4.7 km^{2}) (0.5%) is water. It is the fourth-smallest county in Iowa by land area and third-smallest by total area.

=== Major highways ===
- Interstate 35/Iowa Highway 27
- U.S. Highway 65
- U.S. Highway 69
- Iowa Highway 9

=== Adjacent counties ===
- Freeborn County, Minnesota (north)
- Mower County, Minnesota (northeast)
- Mitchell County (east)
- Cerro Gordo County (south)
- Winnebago County (west)

== Demographics ==
Historical population
Census	Pop.	Note	%±
1860	756		—
1870	2,892		282.5%
1880	7,953		175.0%
1890	9,247		16.3%
1900	10,887		17.7%
1910	9,950		−8.6%
1920	11,630		16.9%
1930	11,164		−4.0%
1940	11,449		2.6%
1950	11,068		−3.3%
1960	10,259		−7.3%
1970	8,968		−12.6%
1980	9,075		1.2%
1990	7,991		−11.9%
2000	7,909		−1.0%
2010	7,598		−3.9%
2020	7,443		−2.0%
2025 (est.)	7,338	▼	−1.4%
U.S. Decennial Census; 1790–1960 1900–1990; 1990–2000 2010–2020

=== 2020 census ===
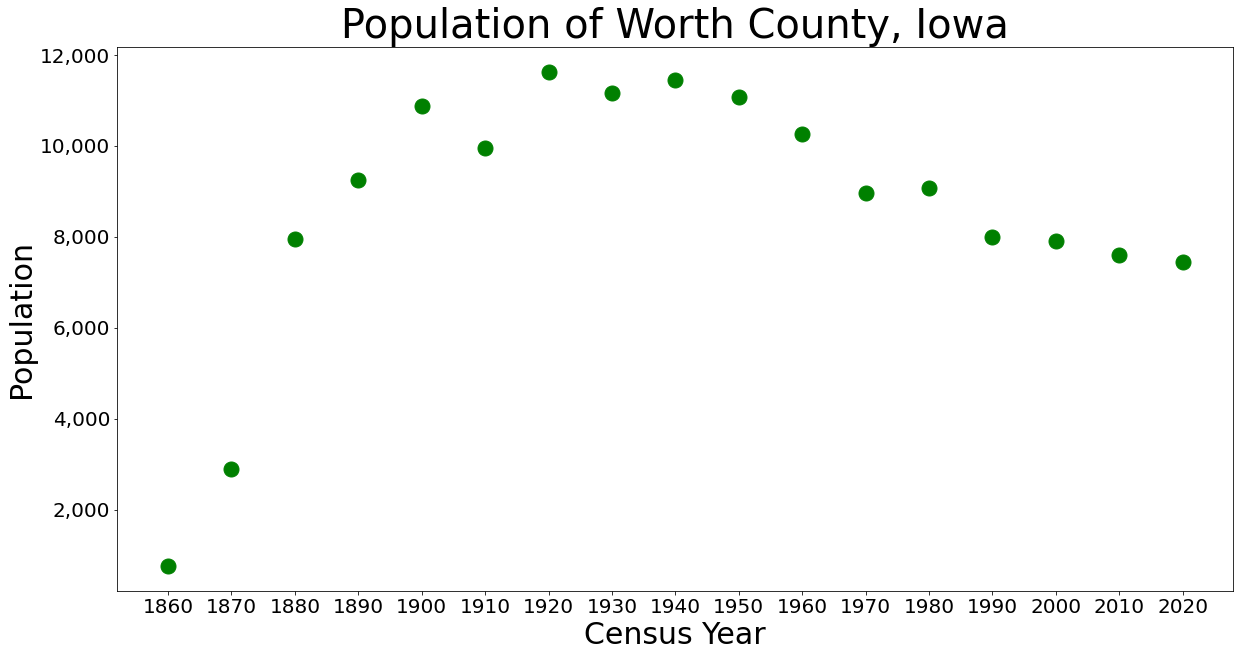
Population of Worth County from the U.S. census data

As of the 2020 census, the county had a population of 7,443 and a population density of 18.5/sq mi (7.2/km^{2}). There were 3,480 housing units, of which 3,127 were occupied.

96.49% of the population reported being of one race. The racial makeup of the county was 94.6% White, 0.8% Black or African American, 0.1% American Indian and Alaska Native, 0.4% Asian, <0.1% Native Hawaiian and Pacific Islander, 0.5% from some other race, and 3.5% from two or more races. Hispanic or Latino residents of any race comprised 2.8% of the population.

The median age was 43.3 years. 22.6% of residents were under the age of 18 and 21.7% of residents were 65 years of age or older. For every 100 females there were 103.0 males, and for every 100 females age 18 and over there were 99.7 males age 18 and over.

There were 3,127 households in the county, of which 27.6% had children under the age of 18 living in them. Of all households, 53.1% were married-couple households, 19.5% were households with a male householder and no spouse or partner present, and 20.1% were households with a female householder and no spouse or partner present. About 29.0% of all households were made up of individuals and 14.3% had someone living alone who was 65 years of age or older.

<0.1% of residents lived in urban areas, while 100.0% lived in rural areas.

=== 2010 census ===
As of the 2010 census recorded a population of 7,598 in the county, with a population density of 19.0/sq mi (7.3/km^{2}). There were 3,548 housing units, of which 3,172 were occupied.

=== 2000 census ===
As of the 2000 census, there were 7,909 people, 3,278 households, and 2,265 families in the county. The population density was 20 people per square mile (7.7 people/km^{2}). There were 3,534 housing units at an average density of 9 per square mile (3.5/km^{2}). The racial makeup of the county was 98.37% White, 0.28% Black or African American, 0.09% Native American, 0.14% Asian, 0.01% Pacific Islander, 0.42% from other races, and 0.70% from two or more races. 1.57%. were Hispanic or Latino of any race.

There were 3,278 households 30.40% had children under the age of 18 living with them, 58.10% were married couples living together, 7.30% had a female householder with no husband present, and 30.90% were non-families. 27.60% of households were one person and 14.30% were one person aged 65 or older. The average household size was 2.38 and the average family size was 2.88.

The age distribution was 24.30% under the age of 18, 6.50% from 18 to 24, 26.30% from 25 to 44, 23.50% from 45 to 64, and 19.40% 65 or older. The median age was 41 years. For every 100 females, there were 98.50 males. For every 100 females age 18 and over, there were 95.20 males.

The median household income was $36,444 and the median family income was $41,763. Males had a median income of $27,927 versus $20,897 for females. The per capita income for the county was $16,952. About 6.30% of families and 8.30% of the population were below the poverty line, including 9.60% of those under age 18 and 7.80% of those age 65 or over.

== Communities ==
=== Cities ===
- Fertile
- Grafton
- Hanlontown
- Joice
- Kensett
- Manly
- Northwood

=== Census-designated place ===
- Bolan

=== Townships ===
- Barton
- Bristol
- Brookfield
- Danville
- Deer Creek
- Fertile
- Grove
- Hartland
- Kensett
- Lincoln
- Silver Lake
- Union

=== Population ranking ===
The population ranking of the following table is based on the 2020 census of Worth County.

† county seat

Rank	City/Town/etc.	Municipal type	Population (2020 Census)
1	† Northwood	City	2,072
2	Manly	City	1,256
3	Fertile	City	305
4	Kensett	City	257
5	Grafton	City	216
6	Joice	City	208
7	Hanlontown	City	206
8	Bolan	CDP	32

== Politics ==
From its inaugural election in 1860 through 1928, Worth County backed the Republican candidate in every election with the exception of 1912, when former Republican Theodore Roosevelt won as the Progressive candidate. From 1932 to 1980, the county was a bellwether, backing the nationwide winner in every election in that span except for 1960. For the next eight elections, Worth County favored the Democratic nominee in every election, each time by a margin of at least 10% except for 1984. In 2016, the county shifted back to the right, with Donald Trump winning nearly 58% of the vote in Worth County with a margin of victory of almost 22%. He improved on this in 2020, taking almost 62% of the vote and winning by a margin of victory of nearly 26%, the best performance by any candidate since Lyndon B. Johnson in 1964, the best performance by a Republican since Herbert Hoover in 1928, and the best margin of victory for any candidate since 1928 as well.

United States presidential election results for Worth County, Iowa
Year	Republican		Democratic		Third party(ies)	
Year	No.	%	No.	%	No.	%
1896	1,696	73.74%	584	25.39%	20	0.87%
1900	1,730	77.30%	475	21.22%	33	1.47%
1904	1,659	81.97%	307	15.17%	58	2.87%
1908	1,433	74.33%	449	23.29%	46	2.39%
1912	354	17.86%	402	20.28%	1,226	61.86%
1916	1,463	70.44%	566	27.25%	48	2.31%
1920	3,401	84.83%	516	12.87%	92	2.29%
1924	2,340	50.97%	180	3.92%	2,071	45.11%
1928	2,921	67.60%	1,310	30.32%	90	2.08%
1932	1,690	38.45%	2,640	60.07%	65	1.48%
1936	1,964	39.41%	2,976	59.71%	44	0.88%
1940	2,434	44.62%	3,007	55.12%	14	0.26%
1944	2,086	44.15%	2,629	55.64%	10	0.21%
1948	1,878	40.50%	2,623	56.57%	136	2.93%
1952	3,315	61.34%	2,075	38.40%	14	0.26%
1956	2,700	52.25%	2,465	47.71%	2	0.04%
1960	2,740	54.28%	2,303	45.62%	5	0.10%
1964	1,777	37.62%	2,936	62.16%	10	0.21%
1968	2,383	53.91%	1,815	41.06%	222	5.02%
1972	2,564	55.31%	2,034	43.87%	38	0.82%
1976	1,964	44.38%	2,399	54.21%	62	1.40%
1980	2,247	52.13%	1,721	39.93%	342	7.94%
1984	1,985	46.53%	2,263	53.05%	18	0.42%
1988	1,488	37.37%	2,440	61.28%	54	1.36%
1992	1,382	31.07%	2,009	45.17%	1,057	23.76%
1996	1,284	32.00%	2,293	57.15%	435	10.84%
2000	1,659	41.43%	2,208	55.14%	137	3.42%
2004	1,795	43.54%	2,286	55.45%	42	1.02%
2008	1,612	37.85%	2,567	60.27%	80	1.88%
2012	1,744	41.80%	2,350	56.33%	78	1.87%
2016	2,453	57.62%	1,530	35.94%	274	6.44%
2020	2,738	61.97%	1,596	36.12%	84	1.90%
2024	2,715	63.33%	1,508	35.18%	64	1.49%

== See also ==
- Worth County Courthouse
- National Register of Historic Places listings in Worth County, Iowa
