= Danville Township, Worth County, Iowa =

Township in Worth County, Iowa, U.S.

Coordinates: 43.3011°N 93.3178°W

Danville Township is a township in Worth County, Iowa, USA.

== History ==
Danville Township was established in 1872.
