= Mason Township, Cerro Gordo County, Iowa =

Township in Iowa, US

Mason Township, Cerro Gordo County
- Township
- Coordinates: 43°06′29″N 093°11′42″W
- Country: United States
- State: Iowa
- County: Cerro Gordo

Area
  - Total: 18.10 sq mi (46.88 km^{2})
  - Land: 18.05 sq mi (46.75 km^{2})
  - Water: 0.050 sq mi (0.13 km^{2})
- Elevation: 1,191 ft (363 m)

Population (2000)
  - Total: 464
  - Density: 26/sq mi (9.9/km^{2})
- FIPS code: 19-92886
- GNIS feature ID: 0468364

Mason Township is one of sixteen townships in Cerro Gordo County, Iowa, United States. As of the 2000 census, its population was 464.

== Geography ==
Mason Township covers an area of 18.1 square miles (47 km^{2}) and contains no incorporated settlements. It is the smallest township in area in the county. Mason City, the county seat, borders it to the north. A very tiny exclave of the township actually lies just northeast of Mason City.
