= Deer Creek Township, Worth County, Iowa =

Township in Worth County, Iowa, U.S.

Coordinates: 43.4536°N 93.0769°W

Deer Creek Township is a township in Worth County, Iowa, USA.

== History ==
Deer Creek Township was established in 1872.
