= Barton Township, Worth County, Iowa =

Township in Worth County, Iowa, U.S.

Coordinates: 43.3789°N 93.0739°W

Barton Township is a township in Worth County, Iowa, United States. At the 2020 United States census, the population of Barton Township was 202.

== History ==
Barton Township was established in 1877. It was named from a Barton in England.
