= Silver Lake Township, Worth County, Iowa =

Township in Worth County, Iowa, U.S.

Coordinates: 43.4589°N 93.4294°W

Silver Lake Township is a township in Worth County, Iowa, USA.

== History ==
Silver Lake Township was established in 1860.
