= Burchinal, Iowa =

- Census-designated place
- Location within Iowa
- Coordinates: 43°03′53″N 93°16′43″W
- Country: United States
- State: Iowa
- County: Cerro Gordo

Area
  - Total: 0.077 sq mi (0.20 km^{2})
  - Land: 0.077 sq mi (0.20 km^{2})
  - Water: 0 sq mi (0.00 km^{2})
- Elevation: 1,230 ft (370 m)

Population (2020)
  - Total: 33
  - Density: 428.1/sq mi (165.28/km^{2})
- Time zone: UTC-6 (Central (CST))
  - Summer (DST): UTC-5 (CDT)
- ZIP code: 50469
- Area code: 641
- GNIS feature ID: 2585468

Burchinal is an unincorporated community and census-designated place (CDP) in Cerro Gordo County, Iowa, United States. As of the 2020 census, its population was 33.

== Demographics ==
Historical population
| Census | Pop. | Note | %± |
|---|---|---|---|
| 2010 | 40 | | — |
| 2020 | 33 | | −17.5% |
U.S. Decennial Census

=== 2020 census ===
As of the census of 2020, there were 33 people, 15 households, and 5 families residing in the community. The population density was 428.1 inhabitants per square mile (165.3/km^{2}). There were 18 housing units at an average density of 233.5 per square mile (90.2/km^{2}). The racial makeup of the community was 93.9% White, 3.0% Black or African American, 0.0% Native American, 0.0% Asian, 0.0% Pacific Islander, 0.0% from other races and 3.0% from two or more races. Hispanic or Latino persons of any race comprised 3.0% of the population.

Of the 15 households, 6.7% of which had children under the age of 18 living with them, 33.3% were married couples living together, 20.0% were cohabitating couples, 20.0% had a female householder with no spouse or partner present and 26.7% had a male householder with no spouse or partner present. 66.7% of all households were non-families. 40.0% of all households were made up of individuals, 26.7% had someone living alone who was 65 years old or older.

The median age in the community was 44.5 years. 24.2% of the residents were under the age of 20; 0.0% were between the ages of 20 and 24; 27.3% were from 25 and 44; 33.3% were from 45 and 64; and 15.2% were 65 years of age or older. The gender makeup of the community was 72.7% male and 27.3% female.

== History ==
Burchinal's population was 22 in 1902. The population was 56 in 1940. A post office operated in Burchinal from 1887 to 1974.

== Education ==
It is in the Clear Lake Community School District.
