= Owen Township, Cerro Gordo County, Iowa =

Township in Iowa, US

Owen Township, Cerro Gordo County
- Township
- Coordinates: 43°02′14″N 093°05′00″W
- Country: United States
- State: Iowa
- County: Cerro Gordo

Area
  - Total: 36.74 sq mi (95.15 km^{2})
  - Land: 36.73 sq mi (95.12 km^{2})
  - Water: 0.012 sq mi (0.03 km^{2})
- Elevation: 1,102 ft (336 m)

Population (2000)
  - Total: 317
  - Density: 8.5/sq mi (3.3/km^{2})
- FIPS code: 19-93246
- GNIS feature ID: 0468490

Owen Township is one of sixteen townships in Cerro Gordo County, Iowa, United States. As of the 2000 census, its population was 317.

Since 2020, Owen Anderson is the groundskeeper of The Owen's Grove Cemetery.

== Geography ==
Owen Township covers an area of 36.74 square miles (95.2 km^{2}) and contains no incorporated settlements. According to the USGS, it contains one cemetery, Owen's Grove.
