= The End of Vandalism =

Book by Tom Drury

- Author: Tom Drury
- Language: English
- Publication date: 1994
- Publication place: United States

Before its publication in 1994, substantial excerpts of American author Tom Drury's novel The End of Vandalism had already been published as minimalist stories in The New Yorker. After publication, it was cited by New York Magazine as one of the nine best books of the year and in 2002 GQ named it among their best 50 works of fiction of the past 50 years.

The book was reissued in the US in 2006 and in the UK in 2015, when The Independent's reviewer called it one of the best books published that year.
