= Falls Township, Cerro Gordo County, Iowa =

Township in Iowa, US

Falls Township, Cerro Gordo County
- Township
- Coordinates: 43°12′35″N 093°05′03″W
- Country: United States
- State: Iowa
- County: Cerro Gordo

Area
  - Total: 35.31 sq mi (91.44 km^{2})
  - Land: 35.31 sq mi (91.44 km^{2})
  - Water: 0 sq mi (0 km^{2})
- Elevation: 1,120 ft (340 m)

Population (2000)
  - Total: 1,093
  - Density: 31/sq mi (12/km^{2})
- FIPS code: 19-91308
- GNIS feature ID: 0467821

Falls Township is one of sixteen townships in Cerro Gordo County, Iowa, United States. As of the 2000 census, its population was 1,093.

== Geography ==
Falls Township covers an area of 35.3 square miles (91 km^{2}) and contains two incorporated settlements: Plymouth and Rock Falls. According to the USGS, it contains three cemeteries: Bohemian, Oakwood and Rock Falls.
