= Union Township, Worth County, Iowa =

Township in Worth County, Iowa, U.S.

Coordinates: 43.2989°N 93.0828°W

Union Township is a township in Worth County, Iowa, USA.

== History ==
Union Township was established in 1863.
