= Grove Township, Worth County, Iowa =

Township in Worth County, Iowa, U.S.

Coordinates: 43.4653°N 93.1931°W

Grove Township is a township in Worth County, Iowa, USA.

== History ==
Grove Township was established in 1857. This township was known by the name of Northwood, until 1902 when it was changed to Grove.
