= Brookfield Township, Worth County, Iowa =

Township in Worth County, Iowa, U.S.

Coordinates: 43.3894°N 93.3297°W

Brookfield Township is a township in Worth County, Iowa, United States.

== History ==
Brookfield Township was established in 1863.
