= Fertile Township, Worth County, Iowa =

Township in Worth County, Iowa, U.S.

Coordinates: 43.3053°N 93.4511°W

Fertile Township is a township in Worth County, Iowa, USA.

== History ==
Fertile Township was organized in 1860.
