= Lake Township, Cerro Gordo County, Iowa =

Township in Iowa, US

Lake Township, Cerro Gordo County
- Township
- Coordinates: 43°07′38″N 093°19′03″W
- Country: United States
- State: Iowa
- County: Cerro Gordo

Area
  - Total: 26.76 sq mi (69.31 km^{2})
  - Land: 26.76 sq mi (69.31 km^{2})
  - Water: 0 sq mi (0 km^{2})
- Elevation: 1,180 ft (360 m)

Population (2000)
  - Total: 345
  - Density: 13/sq mi (5/km^{2})
- FIPS code: 19-92346
- GNIS feature ID: 0468178

Lake Township is one of sixteen townships in Cerro Gordo County, Iowa, United States. As of the 2000 census, its population was 345.

== Geography ==
Lake Township covers an area of 26.76 square miles (69.3 km^{2}) and contains no incorporated settlements. According to the USGS, it contains one cemetery, Memorial Park. Lake Township includes the territory between Mason City and Clear Lake, the two largest cities in the county, and the only two that are not part of any township. Mason City Municipal Airport is located in Lake Township.
