= Dougherty, Iowa =

- City
- Location of Dougherty, Iowa
- Coordinates: 42°55′19″N 93°02′10″W
- Country: US
- State: Iowa
- County: Cerro Gordo

Area
  - Total: 0.56 sq mi (1.45 km^{2})
  - Land: 0.56 sq mi (1.45 km^{2})
  - Water: 0 sq mi (0.00 km^{2})
- Elevation: 1,096 ft (334 m)

Population (2020)
  - Total: 62
  - Density: 110.6/sq mi (42.69/km^{2})
- Time zone: UTC-6 (Central (CST))
  - Summer (DST): UTC-5 (CDT)
- ZIP code: 50433
- Area code: 641
- FIPS code: 19-22080
- GNIS feature ID: 2394551

Dougherty is a city in Cerro Gordo County, Iowa, United States. The population was 62 at the 2020 census. It is part of the Mason City Micropolitan Statistical Area.

== History ==
A post office called Dougherty has been in operation since 1900. Dougherty was named for a local farmer, whose relatives still live.

== Geography ==
According to the United States Census Bureau, the city has a total area of 0.55 square miles (1.42 km^{2}), all land.

== Demographics ==
Historical populations
Year	Pop.	±%
1910	171	—
1920	200	+17.0%
1930	215	+7.5%
1940	215	+0.0%
1950	212	−1.4%
1960	177	−16.5%
1970	133	−24.9%
1980	128	−3.8%
1990	107	−16.4%
2000	80	−25.2%
2010	58	−27.5%
2020	62	+6.9%
Source:"U.S. Census website". United States Census Bureau. and Iowa Data Center; Source: U.S. Decennial Census

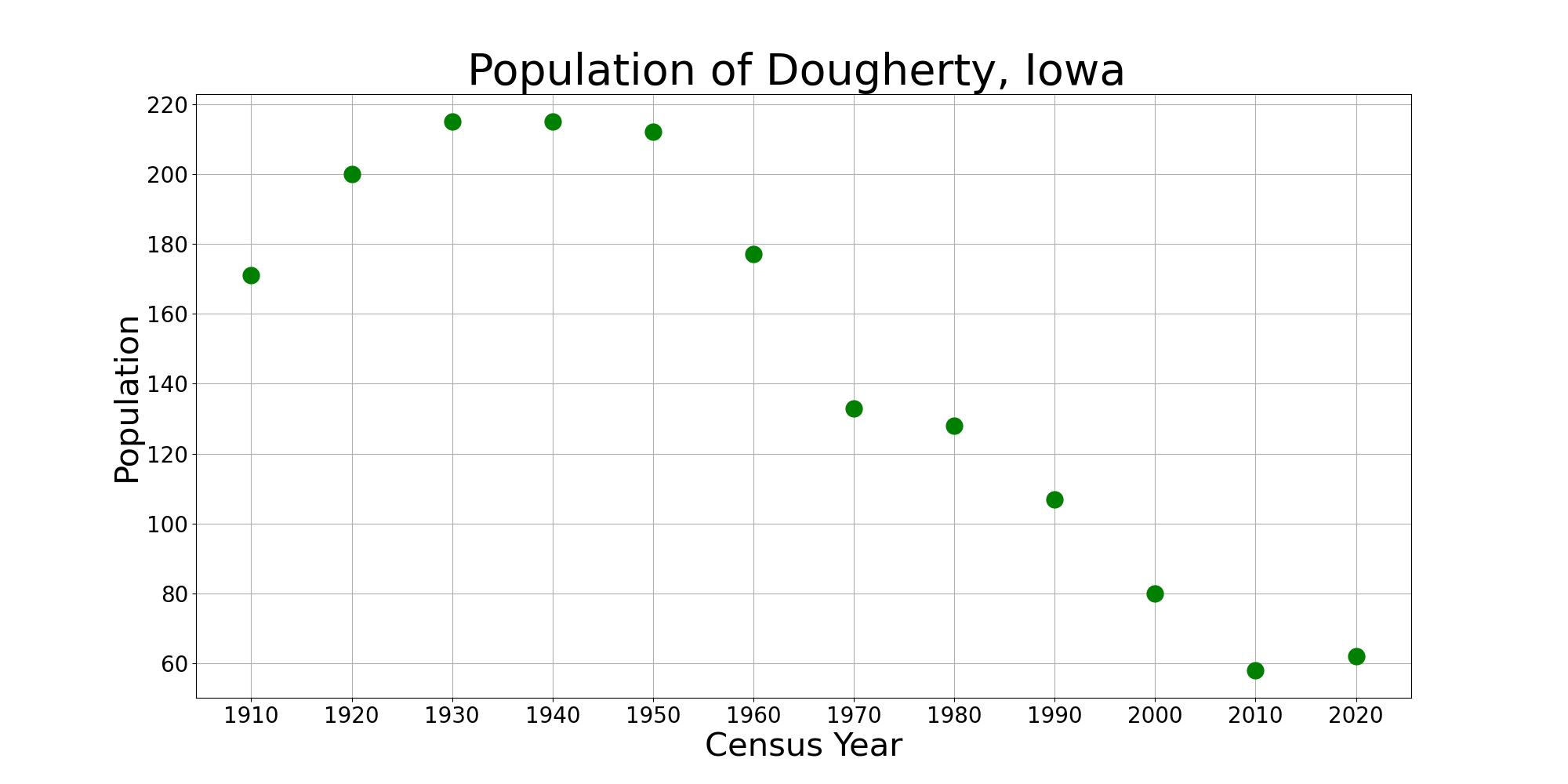
The population of Dougherty, Iowa from US census data

=== 2020 census ===
As of the census of 2020, there were 62 people, 34 households, and 26 families residing in the city. The population density was 110.6 inhabitants per square mile (42.7/km^{2}). There were 38 housing units at an average density of 67.8 per square mile (26.2/km^{2}). The racial makeup of the city was 93.5% White, 4.8% Black or African American, 0.0% Native American, 0.0% Asian, 0.0% Pacific Islander, 1.6% from other races and 0.0% from two or more races. Hispanic or Latino persons of any race comprised 6.5% of the population.

Of the 34 households, 50.0% of which had children under the age of 18 living with them, 52.9% were married couples living together, 11.8% were cohabitating couples, 0.0% had a female householder with no spouse or partner present and 35.3% had a male householder with no spouse or partner present. 23.5% of all households were non-families. 17.6% of all households were made up of individuals, 5.9% had someone living alone who was 65 years old or older.

The median age in the city was 45.8 years. 25.8% of the residents were under the age of 20; 6.5% were between the ages of 20 and 24; 12.9% were from 25 and 44; 38.7% were from 45 and 64; and 16.1% were 65 years of age or older. The gender makeup of the city was 58.1% male and 41.9% female.

=== 2010 census ===
As of the census of 2010, there were 58 people, 29 households, and 18 families living in the city. The population density was 105.5 inhabitants per square mile (40.7/km^{2}). There were 43 housing units at an average density of 78.2 per square mile (30.2/km^{2}). The racial makeup of the city was 96.6% White and 3.4% Asian.

There were 29 households, of which 10.3% had children under the age of 18 living with them, 55.2% were married couples living together, 3.4% had a female householder with no husband present, 3.4% had a male householder with no wife present, and 37.9% were non-families. 31.0% of all households were made up of individuals, and 13.8% had someone living alone who was 65 years of age or older. The average household size was 1.90 and the average family size was 2.33.

The median age in the city was 51.7 years. 8.6% of residents were under the age of 18; 6.8% were between the ages of 18 and 24; 13.8% were from 25 to 44; 46.5% were from 45 to 64; and 24.1% were 65 years of age or older. The gender makeup of the city was 46.6% male and 53.4% female.

=== 2000 census ===
As of the census of 2000, there were 80 people, 37 households, and 19 families living in the city. The population density was 144.5 inhabitants per square mile (55.8/km^{2}). There were 52 housing units at an average density of 93.9 per square mile (36.3/km^{2}). The racial makeup of the city was 96.25% White, 2.50% Native American, and 1.25% from two or more races.

There were 37 households, out of which 29.7% had children under the age of 18 living with them, 45.9% were married couples living together, 2.7% had a female householder with no husband present, and 48.6% were non-families. 48.6% of all households were made up of individuals, and 27.0% had someone living alone who was 65 years of age or older. The average household size was 2.11 and the average family size was 3.11.

In the city, the population was spread out, with 22.5% under the age of 18, 5.0% from 18 to 24, 23.8% from 25 to 44, 28.8% from 45 to 64, and 20.0% who were 65 years of age or older. The median age was 44 years. For every 100 females, there were 105.1 males. For every 100 females age 18 and over, there were 113.8 males.

The median income for a household in the city was $36,458, and the median income for a family was $50,417. Males had a median income of $23,750 versus $30,893 for females. The per capita income for the city was $19,569. There were no families and 4.2% of the population living below the poverty line, including no under eighteens and none of those over 64.

== Education ==
Dougherty is part of the West Fork Community School District, formed in 2011 by the merger of SCMT (Sheffield–Chapin–Meservey–Thornton) Community School District and the Rockwell–Swaledale Community School District.
