= Lincoln Township, Worth County, Iowa =

Township in Worth County, Iowa, U.S.

Coordinates: 43.2992°N 93.1994°W

Lincoln Township is a township in Worth County, Iowa, USA.

== History ==
Lincoln Township was established in 1872.
