= Grimes Township, Cerro Gordo County, Iowa =

Township in Iowa, US

Grimes Township, Cerro Gordo County
- Township
- Coordinates: 42°56′58″N 093°25′55″W
- Country: United States
- State: Iowa
- County: Cerro Gordo

Area
  - Total: 36.08 sq mi (93.44 km^{2})
  - Land: 36.08 sq mi (93.44 km^{2})
  - Water: 0 sq mi (0 km^{2})
- Elevation: 1,240 ft (378 m)

Population (2000)
  - Total: 851
  - Density: 24/sq mi (9.1/km^{2})
- FIPS code: 19-91773
- GNIS feature ID: 0467978

Grimes Township is one of sixteen townships in Cerro Gordo County, Iowa, United States. As of the 2000 census, its population was 851.

== Geography ==
Grimes Township covers an area of 36.08 square miles (93.4 km^{2}) and contains two incorporated settlements: all of Meservey and most of Thornton (which is partly in Pleasant Valley Township to the east). According to the USGS, it contains one cemetery, Pleasant View.
