= Kensett Township, Worth County, Iowa =

Township in Worth County, Iowa, U.S.

Coordinates: 43.3872°N 93.2039°W

Kensett Township is a township in Worth County, Iowa, United States. At the 2020 United States census, the population of Kensett Township was 454.

== History ==
Kensett Township was established in 1876.

== Geography ==
Kensett Township has an elevation of 1,191 feet (363 m).
