= Mount Vernon Township, Cerro Gordo County, Iowa =

Township in Iowa, US

Mount Vernon Township, Cerro Gordo County
- Township
- Coordinates: 43°02′17″N 093°19′12″W
- Country: United States
- State: Iowa
- County: Cerro Gordo

Area
  - Total: 36.3 sq mi (94.1 km^{2})
  - Land: 36.25 sq mi (93.89 km^{2})
  - Water: 0.081 sq mi (0.21 km^{2})
- Elevation: 1,150 ft (350 m)

Population (2000)
  - Total: 351
  - Density: 9.6/sq mi (3.7/km^{2})
- FIPS code: 19-93042
- GNIS feature ID: 0468419

Mount Vernon Township is one of sixteen townships in Cerro Gordo County, Iowa, United States. As of the 2000 census, its population was 351.

== Geography ==
Mount Vernon Township covers an area of 36.33 square miles (94.1 km^{2}) and contains no incorporated settlements. According to the USGS, it contains one cemetery, Mount Vernon.
