= Lime Creek Township, Cerro Gordo County, Iowa =

Township in Iowa, US

Lime Creek Township, Cerro Gordo County
- Township
- Coordinates: 43°12′55″N 093°12′01″W
- Country: United States
- State: Iowa
- County: Cerro Gordo

Area
  - Total: 32.10 sq mi (83.13 km^{2})
  - Land: 32.0 sq mi (82.9 km^{2})
  - Water: 0.093 sq mi (0.24 km^{2})
- Elevation: 1,150 ft (350 m)

Population (2000)
  - Total: 629
  - Density: 20/sq mi (7.6/km^{2})
- FIPS code: 19-92508
- GNIS feature ID: 0468235

Lime Creek Township is one of sixteen townships in Cerro Gordo County, Iowa, United States. As of the 2000 census, its population was 629.

== Geography ==
Lime Creek Township covers an area of 32.1 square miles (83 km^{2}) and contains no incorporated settlements. Mason City, the county seat, borders it to the south.
