= Rockwell, Iowa =

- City
- Location of Rockwell, Iowa
- Coordinates: 42°58′48″N 93°11′14″W
- Country: United States
- State: Iowa
- County: Cerro Gordo

Area
  - Total: 2.97 sq mi (7.70 km^{2})
  - Land: 2.97 sq mi (7.70 km^{2})
  - Water: 0 sq mi (0.00 km^{2})
- Elevation: 1,116 ft (340 m)

Population (2020)
  - Total: 1,071
  - Density: 360.1/sq mi (139.03/km^{2})
- Time zone: UTC-6 (Central (CST))
  - Summer (DST): UTC-5 (CDT)
- ZIP code: 50469
- Area code: 641
- FIPS code: 19-68250
- GNIS feature ID: 2396411
- Website: cityofrockwell.com

Rockwell is a city in Cerro Gordo County, Iowa, United States. The population was 1,071 at the time of the 2020 census. In 2020, it was speculated that the city is part of the Mason City Micropolitan Statistical Area.

== Geography ==
According to the United States Census Bureau, the city has a total area of 2.98 square miles (7.72 km^{2}), all land.

== Demographics ==
Historical populations
Year	Pop.	±%
1880	249	—
1890	381	+53.0%
1900	830	+117.8%
1910	700	−15.7%
1920	800	+14.3%
1930	750	−6.2%
1940	779	+3.9%
1950	753	−3.3%
1960	772	+2.5%
1970	923	+19.6%
1980	1,039	+12.6%
1990	1,008	−3.0%
2000	989	−1.9%
2010	1,039	+5.1%
2020	1,071	+3.1%
Source:"U.S. Census website". United States Census Bureau. and Iowa Data Center; Source: U.S. Decennial Census

=== 2020 census ===
As of the 2020 census, Rockwell had a population of 1,071, with 408 households and 278 families residing in the city. The population density was 360.1 inhabitants per square mile (139.0/km^{2}). There were 438 housing units at an average density of 147.3 per square mile (56.9/km^{2}).

Of the 408 households, 29.7% had children under the age of 18 living with them, 55.9% were married-couple households, 8.3% were cohabiting couple households, 20.1% had a female householder with no spouse or partner present, and 15.7% had a male householder with no spouse or partner present. Non-family households made up 31.9% of all households. About 25.7% of all households were made up of individuals, and 11.7% had someone living alone who was 65 years of age or older.

The median age was 40.2 years. 26.7% of residents were under the age of 18, and 23.1% were 65 years of age or older. By broader age groups, 28.8% of residents were under the age of 20; 4.2% were between the ages of 20 and 24; 22.7% were from 25 to 44; and 21.3% were from 45 to 64. The gender makeup of the city was 49.5% male and 50.5% female. For every 100 females, there were 98.0 males; for every 100 females age 18 and over, there were 88.2 males age 18 and over.

There were 438 housing units, of which 6.8% were vacant. The homeowner vacancy rate was 2.6% and the rental vacancy rate was 9.0%. 0.0% of residents lived in urban areas, while 100.0% lived in rural areas.

Racial composition as of the 2020 census
Race	Number	Percent
White	1,050	98.0%
Black or African American	2	0.2%
American Indian and Alaska Native	2	0.2%
Asian	2	0.2%
Native Hawaiian and Other Pacific Islander	0	0.0%
Some other race	2	0.2%
Two or more races	13	1.2%
Hispanic or Latino (of any race)	21	2.0%

=== 2010 census ===
As of the census of 2010, there were 1,039 people, 420 households, and 299 families living in the city. The population density was 348.7 inhabitants per square mile (134.6/km^{2}). There were 444 housing units at an average density of 149.0 units per square mile (57.5 units/km^{2}). The racial makeup of the city was 98.6% White, 0.1% African American, 0.1% Asian, 0.1% from other races, and 1.2% from two or more races. Hispanic or Latino of any race were 1.6% of the population.

There were 420 households, of which 32.4% had children under the age of 18 living with them, 56.9% were married couples living together, 9.5% had a female householder with no husband present, 4.8% had a male householder with no wife present, and 28.8% were non-families. 25.2% of all households were made up of individuals, and 11.2% had someone living alone who was 65 years of age or older. The average household size was 2.39 and the average family size was 2.83.

The median age in the city was 41.7 years. 23.7% of residents were under the age of 18; 7.6% were between the ages of 18 and 24; 22.5% were from 25 to 44; 26.6% were from 45 to 64; and 19.7% were 65 years of age or older. The gender makeup of the city was 48.4% male and 51.6% female.

=== 2000 census ===
As of the census of 2000, there were 989 people, 371 households, and 268 families living in the city. The population density was 333.2 inhabitants per square mile (128.6/km^{2}). There were 390 housing units at an average density of 131.4 units per square mile (50.7 units/km^{2}). The racial makeup of the city was 97.88% White, 0.10% African American, 0.10% Native American, 0.20% Asian, 0.30% from other races, and 1.42% from two or more races. Hispanic or Latino of any race were 1.62% of the population.

There were 371 households, out of which 36.4% had children under the age of 18 living with them, 63.3% were married couples living together, 6.5% had a female householder with no husband present, and 27.5% were non-families. 25.1% of all households were made up of individuals, and 15.9% had someone living alone who was 65 years of age or older. The average household size was 2.54 and the average family size was 3.06.

In the city, the population was spread out, with 26.7% under the age of 18, 6.6% from 18 to 24, 22.0% from 25 to 44, 22.9% from 45 to 64, and 21.8% who were 65 years of age or older. The median age was 41 years. For every 100 females, there were 93.9 males. For every 100 females age 18 and over, there were 88.8 males.

The median income for a household in the city was $39,219, and the median income for a family was $47,167. Males had a median income of $31,522 versus $21,406 for females. The per capita income for the city was $16,491. About 4.2% of families and 6.8% of the population were below the poverty line, including 7.7% of those under age 18 and 15.5% of those age 65 or over.

== Parks and recreation ==
The city has two large parks, Zeidler Park and Linn Grove. Zeidler Park is a 25-acre park formerly owned by a local business man Verle Zeidler. The land was granted after his death to a trust, which maintains the park. Linn Grove is a 38-acre campground found near Beaver Dam Creek, which feeds into the Cedar River.

Linn Grove Golf Course is situated on the Linn Grove Country Club.

== Education ==
Rockwell is part of the West Fork Community School District, formed in 2008 by the merger of the Rockwell–Swaledale Community School District and the SCMT (Sheffield–Chapin–Meservey–Thornton) Community School District. The Rockwell–Swaledale district was formed in 1960 by the merger of the Rockwell Community School District and the Swaledale Community School District.

It is home to the West Fork elementary school. The mascot for West Fork is the Warhawk, and the middle and high school is located in the neighboring town of Sheffield.

== See also ==
- List of cities in Iowa
