= Lincoln Township, Cerro Gordo County, Iowa =

Township in Iowa, US

Lincoln Township, Cerro Gordo County
- Township
- Coordinates: 43°12′34″N 093°19′48″W
- Country: United States
- State: Iowa
- County: Cerro Gordo

Area
  - Total: 35.41 sq mi (91.71 km^{2})
  - Land: 35.39 sq mi (91.65 km^{2})
  - Water: 0.023 sq mi (0.06 km^{2})
- Elevation: 1,198 ft (365 m)

Population (2000)
  - Total: 277
  - Density: 7.8/sq mi (3/km^{2})
- FIPS code: 19-92538
- GNIS feature ID: 0468245

Lincoln Township is one of sixteen townships in Cerro Gordo County, Iowa, United States. As of the 2000 census, its population was 277.

== Geography ==
Lincoln Township covers an area of 35.41 square miles (91.7 km^{2}) and contains no incorporated settlements. According to the USGS, it contains one cemetery, Lincoln. The southeast corner of the township borders Mason City, the county seat.
