= Mason City Transit =

Provider of mass transportation in Cerro Gordo County, Iowa

- Headquarters: 10 First Street NW
- Locale: Mason City, Iowa
- Service area: Cerro Gordo County, Iowa
- Service type: Bus service, paratransit
- Routes: 5
- Annual ridership: 175,041 (2019)
- Website: Official website

Mason City Transit is the primary provider of mass transportation in Mason City, Iowa with five routes serving the region. As of 2019, the system provided 175,041 rides over 21,002 annual vehicle revenue hours with 12 buses and 6 paratransit vehicles.

== History ==
Public transit in the Mason City area began with streetcars in 1897, with the Mason City & Clear Lake Railroad Co. In 1936, the streetcars were replaced with bus service. In March 2022, a transit bus was involved in a collision after a medical emergency. Later that year, service was adjusted temporarily to accommodate RAGBRAI in Mason City.

== Service ==
Mason City Transit operates 5 weekday bus routes on a pulse system with all routes leaving the Central Park Transfer Facility on the hour and half hour. The Transfer Facility was constructed in 1994 and provides passengers with a waiting area and restrooms. Mason City uses a partial flag-stop system, with a few marked bus stop locations or shelters, while riders may flag down buses at other locations along the routes.

Hours of operation for the system are Monday through Friday from 6:30 a.m. to 6:00 p.m. There is no service on Saturdays and Sundays. Regular fares are $0.50, except for children, who ride free.

== Fixed Route Ridership ==
The ridership statistics shown here are of fixed route services only and do not include demand response.

== See also ==
- List of bus transit systems in the United States
- MET Transit
