= Cerro Gordo County, Iowa =

County in Iowa, United States

- County
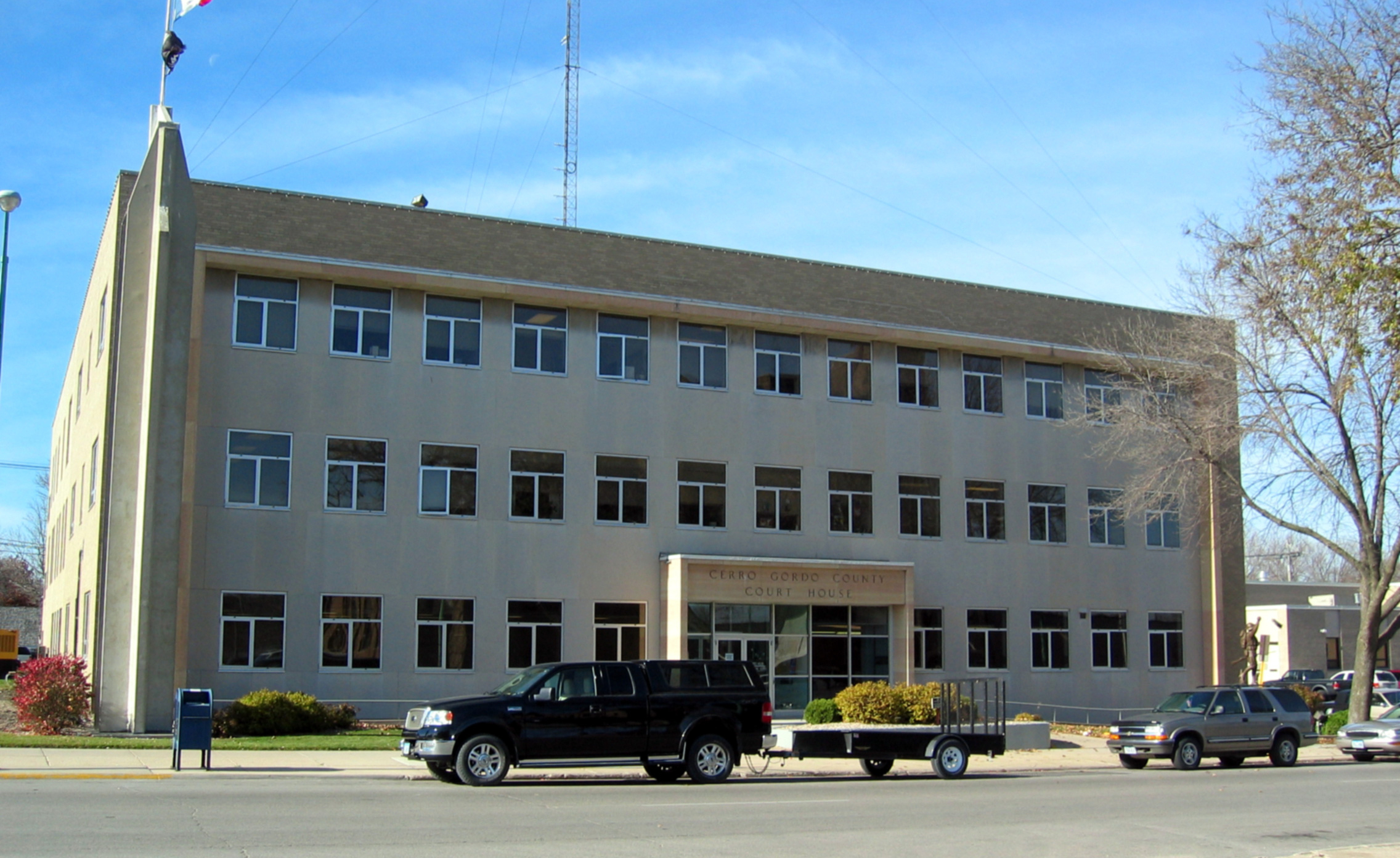
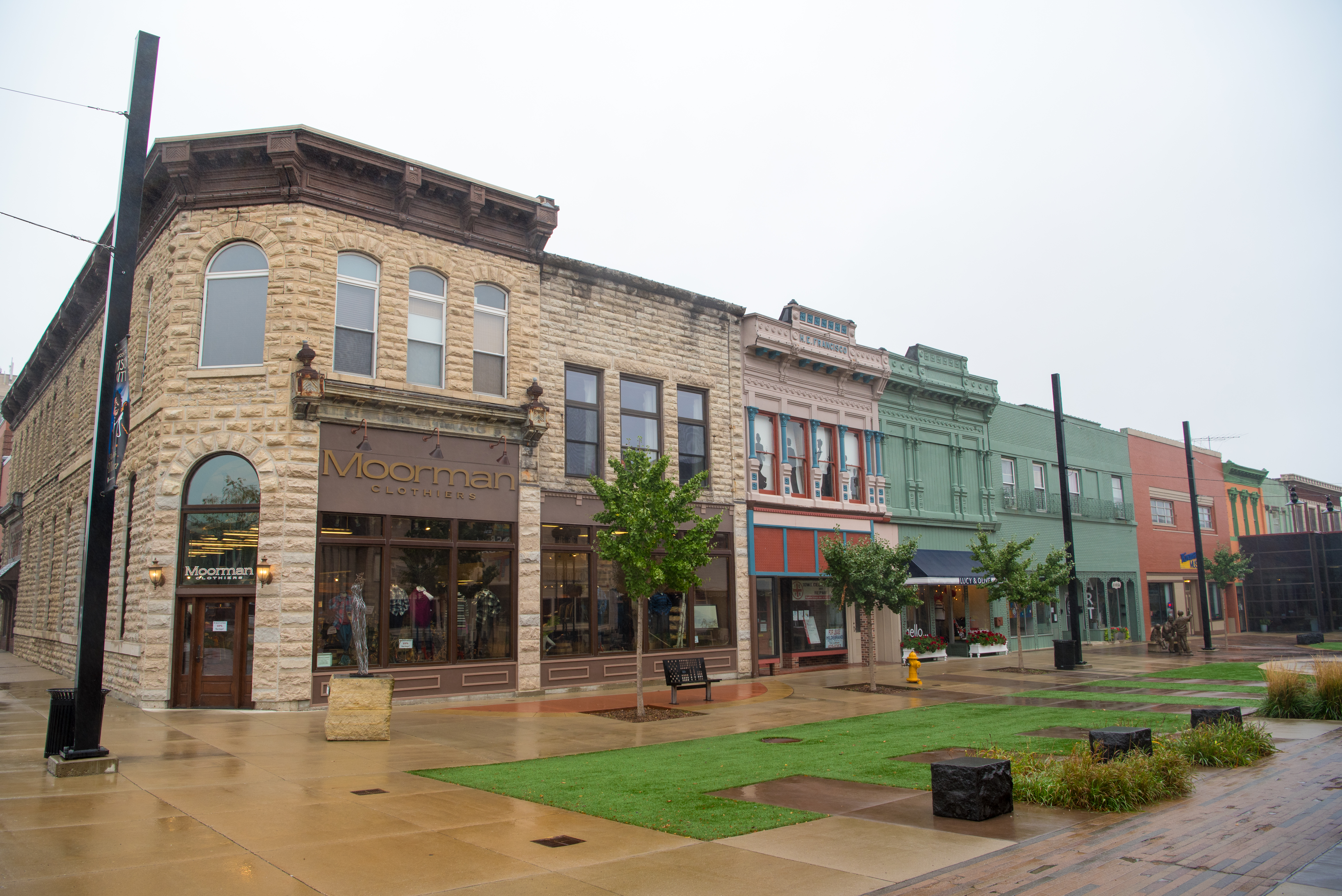
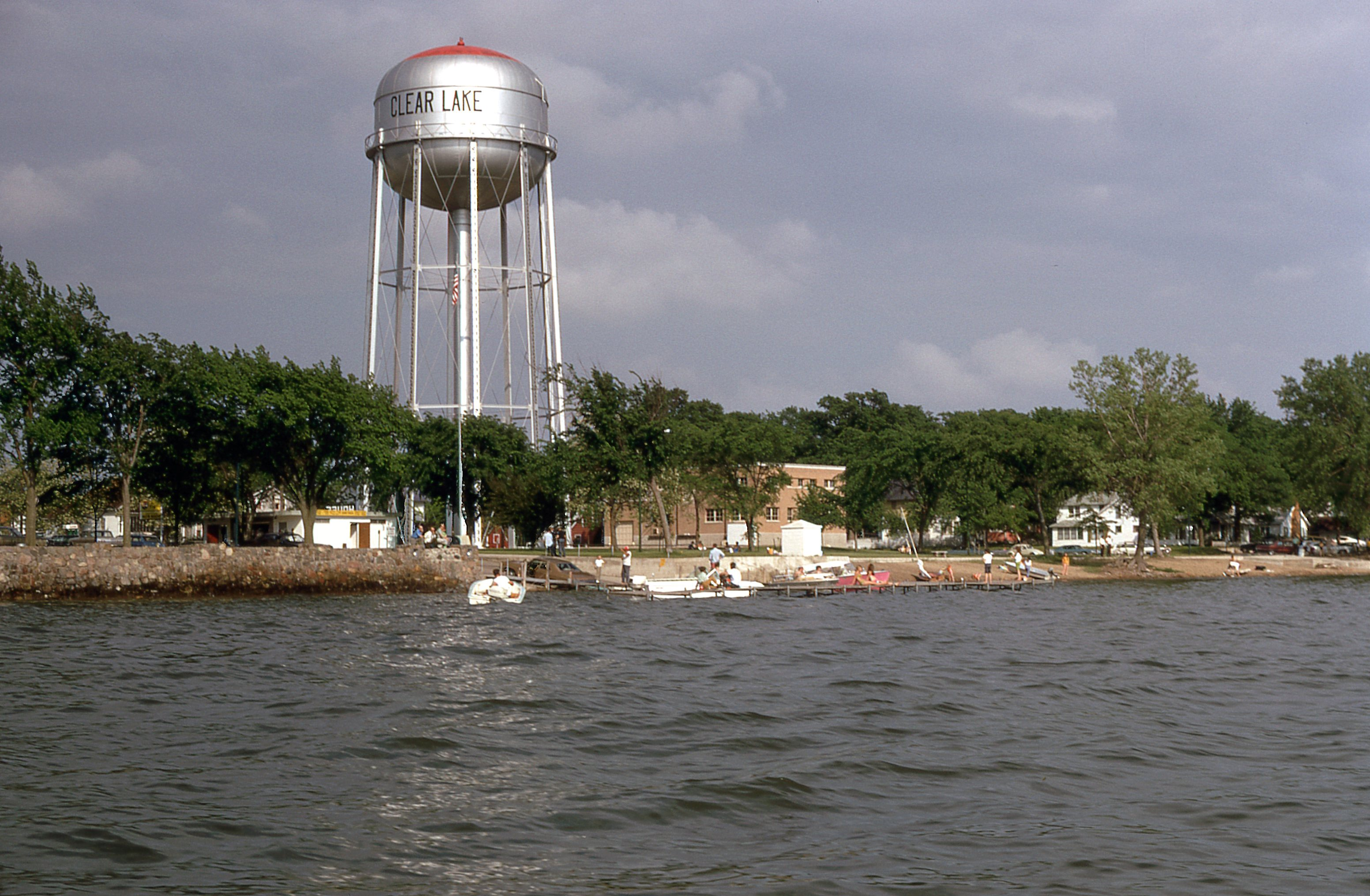
- Cerro Gordo County Courthouse Mason City Clear Lake

- Seal

- Location within the U.S. state of Iowa
- Coordinates: 43°04′46″N 93°16′01″W
- Country: United States
- State: Iowa
- Founded: 1851
- Named for: Battle of Cerro Gordo
- Seat: Mason City
- Largest city: Mason City

Area
  - Total: 575 sq mi (1,490 km^{2})
  - Land: 568 sq mi (1,470 km^{2})
  - Water: 6.8 sq mi (18 km^{2}) 1.2%

Population (2020)
  - Total: 43,127
  - Estimate (2025): 42,372 ▼
  - Density: 75.9/sq mi (29.3/km^{2})
- Time zone: UTC−6 (Central)
  - Summer (DST): UTC−5 (CDT)
- Congressional district: 4th
- Website: cerrogordo.gov
- Iowa county number 17

Cerro Gordo County (/ˈsɛroʊ ˈɡɔːrdoʊ/; Spanish: [ˈsero ˈɣoɾðo]) is a county located in the U.S. state of Iowa. As of the 2020 census, the population was 43,127. Its county seat is Mason City. The county is named for the Battle of Cerro Gordo, which took place during the Mexican–American War. The county is part of the Mason City, IA Micropolitan Statistical Area.

== History ==
Cerro Gordo County was formed in 1851 and takes its name from the Battle of Cerro Gordo in the Mexican–American War, where General Winfield Scott defeated the Mexican General Santa Anna on April 18, 1847. In 1851, the first white settlers came into the area of the present county and settled on Clear Lake. Four years later, on August 7, 1855, the first elections were held and the first legal proceedings occurred in 1857. In the summer of the same year, Livonia was chosen as the new county seat. In 1858, the seat was returned to Mason City. In 1866, the first courthouse was erected, which was used until 1900. The courthouse still used today opened on November 17, 1960.

In 1875, Cerro Gordo County was described thusly, "This county is situated in the second tier from the northern line of the state, and is the fifth west from the Mississippi. It is twenty-four miles square and contains an area of 368,640 acres. Like most portions of Northern Iowa, it has a very pleasing diversity of surface, particularly in the eastern portion, produced by the valleys of the numerous creeks and streams, by which the county is well drained, while the prairies, which form the greater portion of the area of the county, are not devoid of a good degree of diversity occasioned by their undulations. The prairies, except in the southwest, where a number of extensive marshes are found, are generally high, rolling and dry, though never being sufficiently broken or abrupt to render them unsuitable for pleasant and profitable cultivation."

Cerro Gordo County was the site of the airplane crash north of the city of Clear Lake, in which rock and roll stars Buddy Holly, Ritchie Valens, and J.P. "The Big Bopper" Richardson, along with their pilot Roger A. Peterson, were killed on February 3, 1959. The site is in Grant Township, in the northwestern part of the county.

== Geography ==
According to the U.S. Census Bureau, the county has a total area of 575 square miles (1,490 km^{2}), of which 568 square miles (1,470 km^{2}) is land and 6.8 square miles (18 km^{2}) (1.2%) is water.

=== Major highways ===
- Interstate 35
- U.S. Highway 18
- U.S. Highway 65
- Iowa Highway 27
- Iowa Highway 122

=== Transit ===
- Mason City Transit

=== Airport ===
The county also has a municipal airport, Mason City Municipal Airport, (MCW)List of counties in Iowa.

== Demographics ==
Historical population
Census	Pop.	Note	%±
1860	940		—
1870	4,722		402.3%
1880	11,461		142.7%
1890	14,864		29.7%
1900	20,672		39.1%
1910	25,011		21.0%
1920	34,675		38.6%
1930	38,476		11.0%
1940	43,845		14.0%
1950	46,053		5.0%
1960	49,894		8.3%
1970	49,223		−1.3%
1980	48,458		−1.6%
1990	46,733		−3.6%
2000	46,447		−0.6%
2010	44,151		−4.9%
2020	43,127		−2.3%
2025 (est.)	42,372	▼	−1.8%
U.S. Decennial Census; 1790-1960 1900-1990; 1990-2000 2010-2018

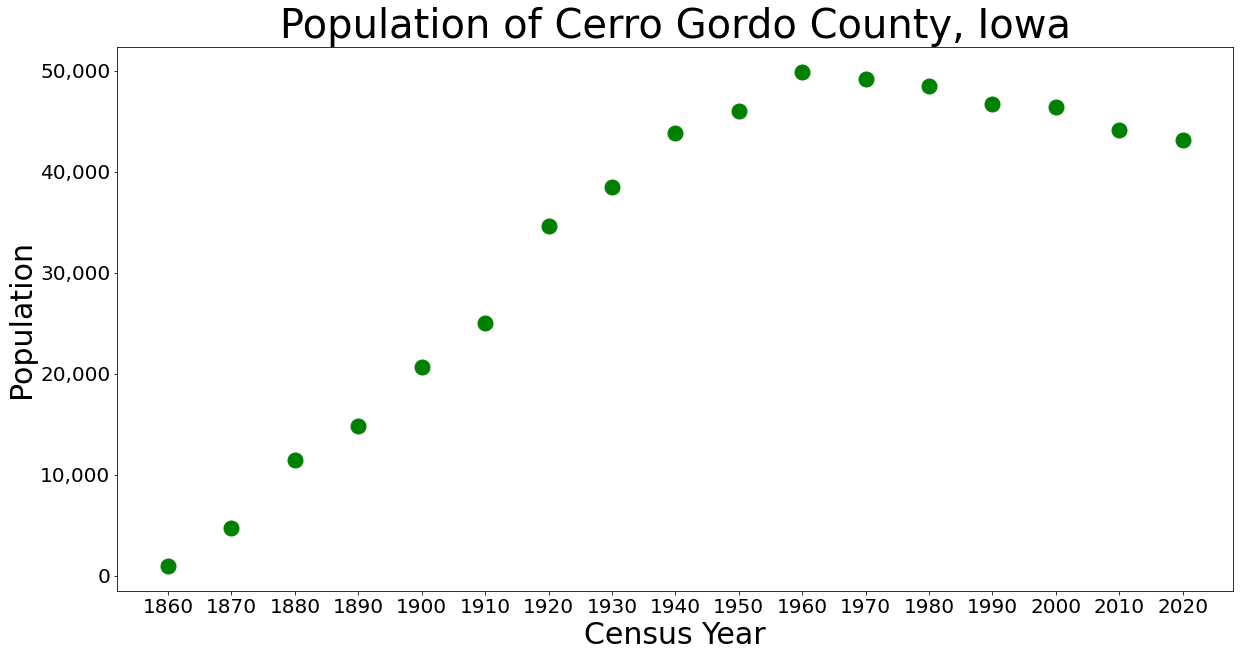
Population of Cerro Gordo County from US census data

=== 2020 census ===
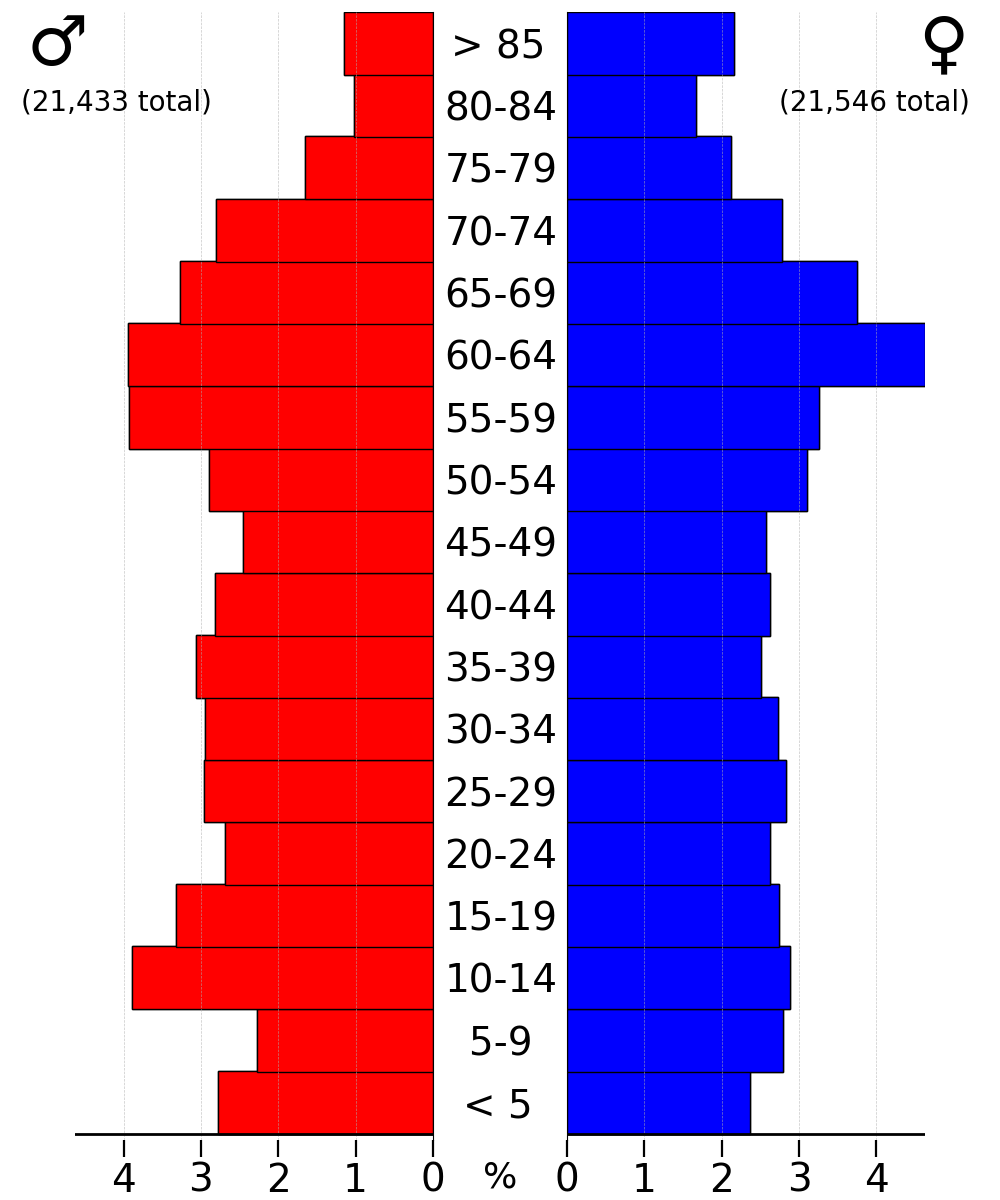
2022 US Census population pyramid for Cerro Gordo County from ACS 5-year estimates

As of the 2020 census, the county had a population of 43,127 and a population density of 75.0/sq mi (28.9/km^{2}). The median age was 44.7 years, 20.2% of residents were under the age of 18, and 23.3% of residents were 65 years of age or older. For every 100 females there were 95.2 males, and for every 100 females age 18 and over there were 93.4 males age 18 and over.

There were 19,224 households in the county, of which 23.3% had children under the age of 18 living in them. Of all households, 45.1% were married-couple households, 19.9% were households with a male householder and no spouse or partner present, and 27.7% were households with a female householder and no spouse or partner present. About 35.0% of all households were made up of individuals and 16.0% had someone living alone who was 65 years of age or older.

There were 22,603 housing units, of which 14.9% were vacant. Among occupied housing units, 69.6% were owner-occupied and 30.4% were renter-occupied. The homeowner vacancy rate was 2.3% and the rental vacancy rate was 13.0%.

79.7% of residents lived in urban areas, while 20.3% lived in rural areas.

=== Racial and ethnic composition ===
Cerro Gordo County Racial Composition
Race	Number	Percent
White (NH)	37,819	87.7%
Black or African American (NH)	848	2%
Native American (NH)	96	0.22%
Asian (NH)	535	1.24%
Pacific Islander (NH)	137	0.32%
Other/Mixed (NH)	1,449	3.4%
Hispanic or Latino	2,243	5.2%

=== 2010 census ===
The 2010 census recorded a population of 44,151 in the county, with a population density of 77.7/sq mi (30.0/km^{2}). There were 22,163 housing units, of which 19,350 were occupied.

=== 2000 census ===
At the 2000 census there were 46,447 people, 19,374 households, and 12,399 families in the county. The population density was 82 inhabitants per square mile (32/km^{2}). There were 21,488 housing units at an average density of 38 per square mile (15/km^{2}). The racial makeup of the county was 96.26% White, 0.80% Black or African American, 0.17% Native American, 0.70% Asian, 0.02% Pacific Islander, 0.88% from other races, and 1.16% from two or more races. 2.78%. were Hispanic or Latino of any race.

There were 19,374 households 29.10% had children under the age of 18 living with them, 51.90% were married couples living together, 9.10% had a female householder with no husband present, and 36.00% were non-families. 30.90% of households were one person and 13.50% were one person aged 65 or older. The average household size was 2.32 and the average family size was 2.91.

The age distribution was 23.80% under the age of 18, 9.00% from 18 to 24, 26.40% from 25 to 44, 23.20% from 45 to 64, and 17.70% 65 or older. The median age was 39 years. For every 100 females, there were 92.80 males. For every 100 females age 18 and over, there were 89.10 males.

The median household income was $35,867 and the median family income was $46,099. Males had a median income of $31,790 versus $21,781 for females. The per capita income for the county was $19,184. About 5.90% of families and 8.50% of the population were below the poverty line, including 9.10% of those under age 18 and 8.60% of those age 65 or over.

== Communities ==
=== Cities ===
- Clear Lake
- Dougherty
- Mason City
- Meservey
- Plymouth
- Rock Falls
- Rockwell
- Swaledale
- Thornton
- Ventura

=== Townships ===
Cerro Gordo County is divided into sixteen townships:

- Bath
- Clear Lake
- Dougherty
- Falls
- Geneseo
- Grant
- Grimes
- Lake
- Lime Creek
- Lincoln
- Mason
- Mount Vernon
- Owen
- Pleasant Valley
- Portland
- Union

=== Census-designated places ===
- Burchinal
- Portland

=== Other unincorporated communities ===
- Cameron
- Cartersville
- Emery
- Freeman
- Hanford
- Hurley
- Mason City Junction
- Owen
- Wheelerwood

=== Population ranking ===
The population ranking of the following table is based on the 2020 census of Cerro Gordo County.

† county seat

Rank	City/Town/etc.	Municipal type	Population (2020 Census)
1	† Mason City	City	27,338
2	Clear Lake	City	7,687
3	Nora Springs (mostly in Floyd County)	City	1,369
4	Rockwell	City	1,071
5	Ventura	City	711
6	Thornton	City	400
7	Plymouth	City	375
8	Meservey	City	222
9	Swaledale	City	144
10	Rock Falls	City	150
11	Dougherty	City	62
12	Burchinal	CDP	33
13	Portland	CDP	28

== Economy ==
In September 2016 Cerro Gordo County supervisors voted to appeal the Iowa Department of Natural Resources's decision to approve construction of a hog confinement facility near Ventura, Iowa.

=== Law enforcement ===
The Cerro Gordo County Sheriff's Office is headed by Sheriff Kevin Pals. The Sheriff's Office provides law enforcement, performs investigations, executes legal processes such as writs, and is responsible for operating the county jail and for inmates in custody.

The Sheriff's Office is at 17262 Lark Ave, Mason City, IA 50401.

== Politics ==
From the county's founding in 1851 until 1928, Cerro Gordo County voted Republican in every single election except for 1912, when former Republican Theodore Roosevelt won the county with a plurality as the Progressive candidate. The tide in the county then shifted from 1932 to 2012, as the Democratic candidate won all but six elections in that span, four of which were nationwide Republican landslides in 1952, 1956, 1972, and 1980. Beginning in 2016, Cerro Gordo County has shifted back to the right, with Donald Trump winning the county in 2016, 2020, and 2024. Whilst Mason City leans Democratic, the rest of the county is Republican.

United States presidential election results for Cerro Gordo County, Iowa
Year	Republican		Democratic		Third party(ies)	
Year	No.	%	No.	%	No.	%
1896	3,048	66.73%	1,408	30.82%	112	2.45%
1900	3,345	69.53%	1,320	27.44%	146	3.03%
1904	3,108	74.55%	836	20.05%	225	5.40%
1908	2,990	64.05%	1,520	32.56%	158	3.38%
1912	1,334	25.64%	1,742	33.49%	2,126	40.87%
1916	3,556	59.28%	2,289	38.16%	154	2.57%
1920	8,293	75.73%	2,302	21.02%	356	3.25%
1924	8,410	58.85%	1,345	9.41%	4,536	31.74%
1928	9,582	65.78%	4,908	33.69%	77	0.53%
1932	7,317	45.12%	8,752	53.96%	149	0.92%
1936	7,599	42.71%	9,694	54.48%	501	2.82%
1940	9,728	47.20%	10,839	52.59%	45	0.22%
1944	8,311	47.60%	9,088	52.05%	60	0.34%
1948	7,840	44.34%	9,544	53.98%	298	1.69%
1952	13,207	61.12%	8,354	38.66%	47	0.22%
1956	12,449	57.00%	9,362	42.86%	30	0.14%
1960	12,830	56.05%	10,044	43.88%	15	0.07%
1964	7,884	37.42%	13,156	62.44%	31	0.15%
1968	10,661	52.49%	8,554	42.12%	1,095	5.39%
1972	11,856	54.65%	9,460	43.61%	377	1.74%
1976	10,604	47.77%	11,189	50.41%	403	1.82%
1980	11,189	49.01%	9,363	41.02%	2,276	9.97%
1984	11,214	48.86%	11,570	50.41%	166	0.72%
1988	9,358	41.84%	12,857	57.49%	150	0.67%
1992	8,250	33.96%	11,415	46.99%	4,628	19.05%
1996	7,427	34.99%	11,943	56.26%	1,857	8.75%
2000	9,397	42.40%	12,185	54.98%	580	2.62%
2004	10,960	44.71%	13,372	54.54%	184	0.75%
2008	9,375	38.83%	14,405	59.67%	363	1.50%
2012	10,128	42.51%	13,316	55.89%	380	1.60%
2016	11,621	50.60%	9,862	42.94%	1,482	6.45%
2020	12,442	52.28%	10,941	45.97%	418	1.76%
2024	12,627	54.85%	9,955	43.25%	438	1.90%

== Education ==
School districts include:

- Central Springs Community School District - Formed on July 1, 2011.
- Clear Lake Community School District
- Forest City Community School District
- Garner–Hayfield–Ventura Community School District - Formed on July 1, 2015.
- Mason City Community School District
- Rudd-Rockford-Marble Rock Community School District
- West Fork Community School District - Formed on July 1, 2011.

Former school districts include:

- Nora Springs-Rock Falls Community School District - Merged into Central Springs on July 1, 2011.
- North Central Community School District - Merged into Central Springs on July 1, 2011.
- Rockwell–Swaledale Community School District - Merged into the West Fork district on July 1, 2011.
- Sheffield–Chapin–Meservey–Thornton Community School District (SCMT) - Formed on July 1, 2007. Merged into the West Fork district on July 1, 2011.
- Ventura Community School District - Merged into Garner-Hayfield-Ventura on July 1, 2015.

== See also ==
- National Register of Historic Places listings in Cerro Gordo County, Iowa
