= Interstate 35 in Iowa =

Section of Interstate Highway in Iowa, United States

Interstate 35
- I-35 highlighted in red

Route information
- Maintained by Iowa DOT
- Length: 219.225 mi (352.808 km)
- Existed: ca. September 21, 1958–present
- History: Under construction 1958–1975
- NHS: Entire route

Major junctions
- South end: I-35 near Lamoni
- US 34 at Osceola; Iowa 5 at West Des Moines; I-80 / I-235 near Des Moines; US 30 at Ames; US 20 near Williams; US 18 / Iowa 27 near Clear Lake and Mason City
- North end: I-35 near Northwood

Location
- Country: United States
- State: Iowa
- Counties: Decatur; Clarke; Warren; Polk; Story; Hamilton; Wright; Franklin; Cerro Gordo; Worth

Highway system
- Interstate Highway System; Main; Auxiliary; Suffixed; Business; Future; Iowa Primary Highway System; Interstate; US; State; Secondary; Scenic
← US 34	→ Iowa 37

Interstate 35 (I-35) is a north–south Interstate Highway in the United States that runs from Laredo, Texas, to Duluth, Minnesota. In Iowa, the highway runs from south to north through the center of the state, roughly parallel to U.S. Highway 69 (US 69) and US 65. It enters the state near Lamoni from Missouri and continues north through the southern Iowa drift plain. In the Des Moines area, I-35 runs concurrently with I-80, and the two highways bypass Des Moines to the west and north. I-235, the only auxiliary route of I-35 in the state, serves the suburbs and downtown Des Moines; it begins and ends at the two interchanges where I-35 and I-80 meet. Near Mason City and Clear Lake, US 18 and Iowa Highway 27 (Iowa 27) overlap with I-35. Shortly after, US 18 splits off to the west in Clear Lake, while Iowa 27 runs with I-35 until they reach the Minnesota state line.

Construction of I-35 in Iowa took place over 17 years. The first 10-mile-long (16 km) section of the route that stretched from Cumming to Urbandale was opened on September 21, 1958. In the next 14 years, new sections of the route opened regularly, only leaving the section between Mason City and US 20 incomplete. On November 14, 1975, the last 50-mile-long (80 km) section of the route was completed and connected the two noncontiguous sections of I-35.

== Route description ==
=== Southern Iowa ===
I-35 enters Iowa at the Missouri state line near the town of Lamoni. An interchange that provides access to the adjacent US 69 and East 100th Street is situated over the state border. The highway travels to the north-northeast for four miles (6.4 km) until it again meets US 69 on the eastern edge of Lamoni. North of Lamoni is a rest area which overlooks the Grand River and provides pedestrian access to Decatur County's Slip Bluff County Park. North of the Grand River, the Interstate straightens to a north–south alignment. Near Decatur City, it intersects Iowa 2 at a diamond interchange. Continuing north, the Interstate slightly eases to the east. Two rural interchanges, for County Road J20 (CR J20) and CR H45/Elk Street, and another in Van Wert for CR J14/East Line Street dot the 21 miles (34 km) separating Decatur City and Osceola.

The Osceola area is served by three interchanges for I-35. The first is a partial cloverleaf interchange with US 34. This junction is so configured because of US 34's proximity to the BNSF Railway line, which carries Amtrak's California Zephyr. The next exit for CR H33/Kansas Street serves a casino and western Osceola. Northwest of Osceola is the western end of Iowa 152, which connects I-35 and US 69 at a narrow point between the two routes. Further north, the small towns of New Virginia, Truro, and St. Charles are each served by an interchange. The Iowa 92 exit just east of Bevington connects I-35 to the larger communities of Winterset and Indianola, to the west and east, respectively. The interchange for Cumming is the last before the Interstate enters the Des Moines metropolitan area.

=== Central Iowa ===
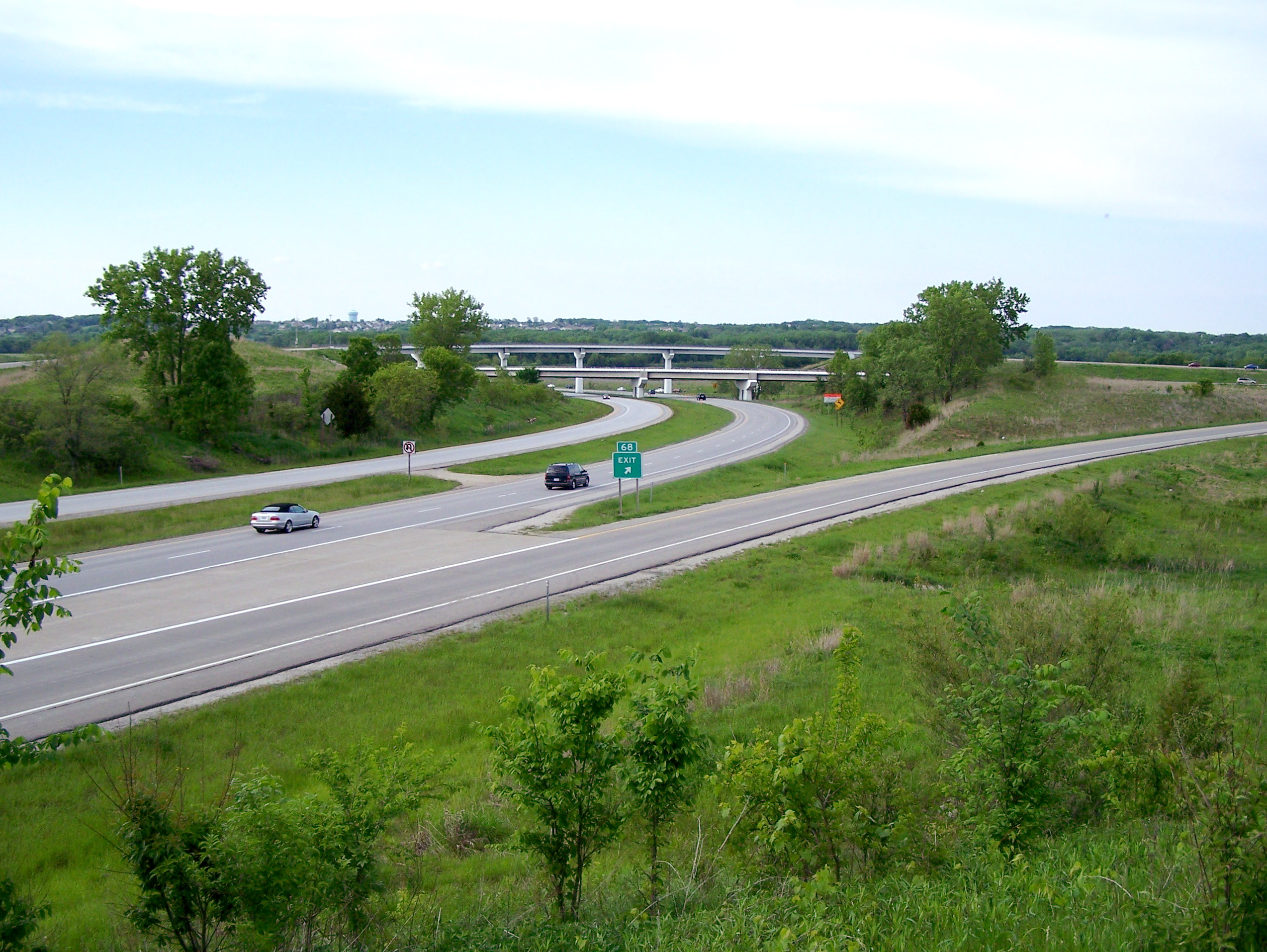
Exit 68 along I-35 is the northern end of Iowa 5

I-35 continues north, enters the Des Moines metropolitan area, and meets the Iowa 5 freeway in West Des Moines at exit 68. Further on in West Des Moines, at the West Mixmaster Interchange, I-35 meets I-80 and I-235. I-235 serves downtown Des Moines, while I-35 and I-80 overlap and serve the Des Moines's western and northern suburbs using I-80's exit numbering. On the Clive–Urbandale city border, I-35 and I-80 meet US 6/Hickman Road. Further north in Urbandale, they meet Iowa 141/Northwest Urbandale Drive/Southeast Grimes Boulevard and turn eastward. They also meet US 69/Northeast 14th Street north of Des Moines. Between Des Moines and Ankeny, at the East Mixmaster interchange, I-35 and I-80 separate at an interchange where they also meet I-235.

I-35 then turns north to go through Ankeny. It continues north and at Ames meets US 30. Ames is also served by the Interstate 35 Business Loop (I-35 BL). I-35 continues north and meets Iowa 175 near Ellsworth and meets the US 20 freeway near the community of Williams. It continues north until the Wright County line, where it turns northeast. On this northeasterly alignment, I-35 meets Iowa 3.

=== Northern Iowa ===
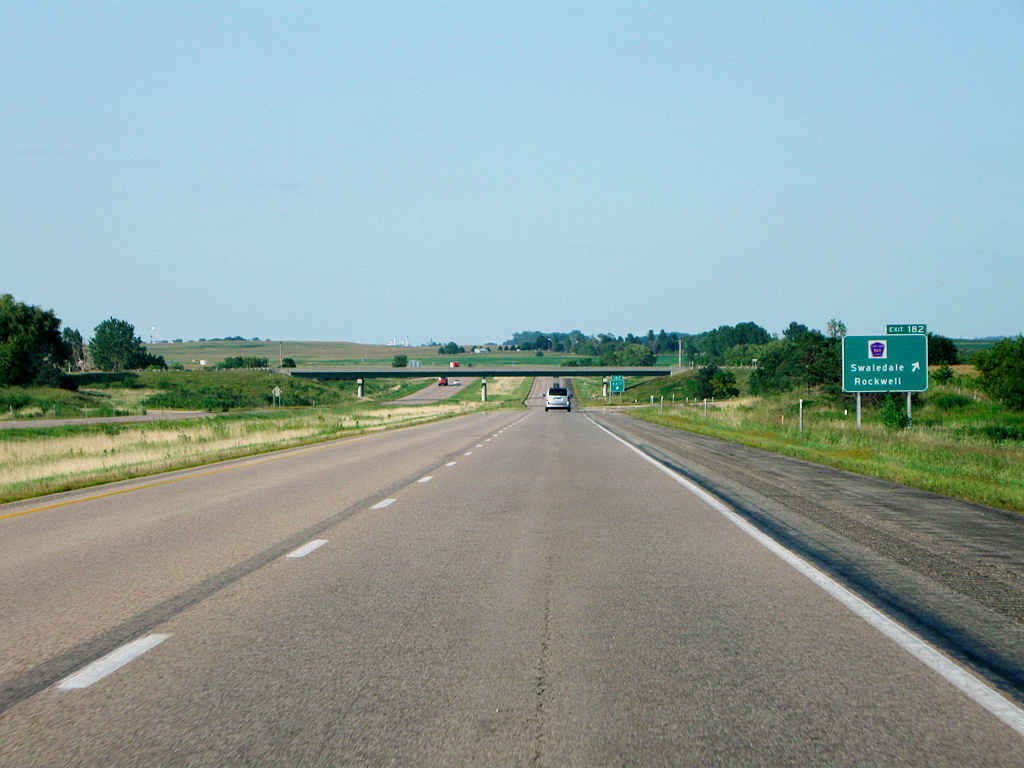
I-35 in Cerro Gordo county near exit 182 about one mile (1.6 km) west of Swaledale

Shortly after meeting Iowa 3, I-35 turns north again and meets both US 18 and Iowa 27 near Clear Lake at exit 190. I-35 overlaps US 18 and Iowa 27 through the Clear Lake area, which is also served with I-35 BL. US 18 separates in Clear Lake at exit 194, and I-35 and Iowa 27, which serves as the designation in Iowa for the Avenue of the Saints, overlap for the rest of the way to the Minnesota border, meeting Iowa 9 near Hanlontown at exit 203.

=== Services ===
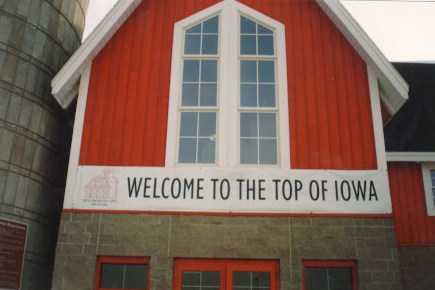
"Top of Iowa" traveler information center, located off exit 214

The Iowa Department of Transportation (Iowa DOT) operates 37 rest areas and one scenic overlook in 20 locations along its 780 miles (1,260 km) of Interstate Highway. Along I-35, there are five locations that have facilities accessible to each direction of traffic. A sixth is under construction in northern Polk County. Parking areas are divided so passenger automobiles are separated from large trucks. Common among all of the rest stops are separate men's and women's restrooms, payphones with TDD capabilities, weather reporting kiosks, vending machines, and free wireless Internet. Many stations have family restrooms and dump stations for recreational vehicles.

The first rest areas along Iowa's Interstates were built in the 1960s. They were modest facilities; separate buildings housed the restrooms and vending machines. A few rest stops had another building with local tourist information. The newer facilities feature one large building housing as many as 28 more toilets than the older buildings, in addition to all the other common rest area amenities. They also feature artwork by local Iowa artists. Each new rest area is designed around a theme. For instance, the facility near Story City celebrates the history of transportation in the state. Story County is the home of Iowa DOT and the location where the historic Lincoln Highway and I-35 intersect.

=== Transit ===
Jefferson Lines provides intercity bus service along the length of I-35 in Iowa serving seven communities along the route. The Des Moines Bus Station serves as a major transfer point along the I-35 route.

== History ==
The first section of I-35, a 10-mile-long (16 km) stretch from Cumming to Urbandale, opened around September 21, 1958. Within five years, the Interstate had grown to 55 miles (89 km), extending from US 34 in Osceola to the eastern interchange with I-80 and I-235. The next two sections of I-35 were the 25 miles (40 km) from Ankeny to US 30 near Ames and the 30 miles (48 km) from Ames to US 20 near Williams.

By 1972, I-35 was completed at the Missouri and Minnesota state lines. In southern Iowa, the last section, from Iowa 2 near Decatur City to the state line, was completed on December 2, 1970. In northern Iowa, the section from Iowa 9 near Hanlontown to the state line opened on December 12, 1972. The last section of I-35 to open, from US 20 to Mason City, opened on November 14, 1975.

== Exit list ==
County	Location	mi	km	Exit	Destinations	Notes
Iowa–Missouri state line		0.000	0.000		I-35 south – Kansas City	Continuation into Missouri
Iowa–Missouri state line		0.000	0.000	114	US 69 – Lamoni	Exit number follows Missouri numbering; interchange is on the state line
Decatur	Lamoni	4.178	6.724	4	US 69 – Lamoni, Davis City	
Decatur	Decatur City	12.823	20.637	12	Iowa 2 – Leon, Mount Ayr	
Decatur	Long Creek Township	17.946	28.881	18	CR J20 – Grand River, Garden Grove	
Decatur	Van Wert	22.293	35.877	22	CR J14 – Van Wert	Former Iowa 258
Clarke	Knox Township	29.368	47.263	29	CR H45	
Clarke	Osceola	33.177	53.393	33	US 34 – Creston, Osceola	Access to Clarke County Hospital
Clarke	Osceola	34.247	55.115	34	Clay Street – Osceola	
Clarke	Osceola Township	36.315	58.443	36	CR R35	Former Iowa 152
Warren	Virginia Township	43.859	70.584	43	CR G76 – New Virginia	Former Iowa 207
Warren	Virginia Township	47.423	76.320	47	CR G64 – Truro	Former Iowa 400
Warren	Jackson Township	51.958	83.618	52	CR G50 – St. Marys, St. Charles	Former Iowa 251
Warren	Bevington	56.753	91.335	56	Iowa 92 – Indianola, Winterset	
Warren	Cumming	65.041	104.673	65	CR G14 – Norwalk, Cumming	
Polk	West Des Moines	67.858– 68.407	109.207– 110.090	68	Iowa 5 south – Norwalk, Carlisle, West Des Moines	Access to Des Moines International Airport
Polk	West Des Moines	69.165	111.310	69	Grand Avenue – West Des Moines	Former Iowa 90; access to DMACC West Campus
Polk	West Des Moines	70.406	113.307	70	Mills Civic Parkway	
Polk	West Des Moines	72.606– 73.445	116.848– 118.198	72A	I-235 east – West Des Moines, Des Moines	I-235 exit 123
Polk	West Des Moines	72.606– 73.445	116.848– 118.198	72B	I-80 west – Council Bluffs, Omaha	Southern end of I-80 concurrency; no exit number southbound; I-80 east exit 123B
Polk	West Des Moines–Clive line	73.231	117.854	72C	University Avenue – Clive	Signed as exit 124 southbound; access to MercyOne West Des Moines Medical Center
Polk	Clive–Urbandale line	74.443	119.804	125 (Note: Exit numbers follow I-80)	US 6 (Hickman Road) – Adel, Waukee	Access to Living History Farms
Polk	Urbandale	75.448	121.422	126	Douglas Avenue – Urbandale	
Polk	Urbandale	76.452	123.038	127A	Meredith Drive	Northbound exit and southbound entrance only; opened October 16, 2020
Polk	Urbandale	76.838	123.659	127B	Iowa 141 west – Grimes	Signed exit 127 southbound and exit 127B northbound
Polk	Urbandale	77.806	125.217	128	100th Street	Opened in 2018
Polk	Urbandale	78.811	126.834	129	Northwest 86th Street – Camp Dodge	
Polk	Urbandale	80.819	130.066	131	Iowa 28 south (Merle Hay Road) – Saylorville Lake	Former Iowa 401
Polk	Saylor Township	84.844	136.543	135	Iowa 415 (2nd Avenue) – Polk City	
Polk	Saylor Township	85.860	138.178	136	US 69 (E. 14th Street) – Ankeny	
Polk	Ankeny	86.795– 87.388	139.683– 140.637	137	I-80 east / I-235 west – Des Moines, Davenport	Northern end of I-80 overlap; northbound signed as exits 137A (I-235) and 137B (I-80), southbound signed as exits 137A (I-80) and 137B (I-235)
Polk	Ankeny	89.041	143.298	89	Corporate Woods Drive	Exit numbers follow I-35
Polk	Ankeny	90.604	145.813	90	Iowa 160 west (Oralabor Road) – Bondurant	Access to Saylorville Lake and Des Moines Area Community College
Polk	Ankeny	92.604	149.032	92	1st Street	Diverging diamond interchange
Polk	Ankeny	94.678	152.369	94	NE 36th Street	Opened November 20, 2012
Polk	Elkhart Township	96.788	155.765	96	Polk City, Elkhart	Former Iowa 87
Story	Huxley	102.752	165.363	102	Iowa 210 – Huxley, Maxwell, Slater, Cambridge	
Story	Ames	111.716	179.789	111	I-35 Business Loop north / US 30 – Nevada, Ames, Iowa State University	Signed as exits 111A (east) and 111B (west/north)
Story	Ames	113.569	182.772	113	I-35 Business Loop south / 13th Street – USDA Veterinary Labs	
Story	Milford Township	116.570	187.601	116	CR E29	
Story	Howard Township	122.989	197.932	123	CR E18 – Roland, McCallsburg	Former Iowa 221
Story	Story City	124.482	200.334	124	Story City	
Hamilton	Scott Township	127.974	205.954	128	CR D65 – Stanhope, Randall	
Hamilton	Ellsworth	132.955	213.970	133	Iowa 175 – Jewell, Eldora	
Hamilton	Rose Grove Township	139.018	223.728	139	CR D41 / CR R61 – Kamrar	
Hamilton	Rose Grove Township	142.498	229.328	142	US 20 – Waterloo, Fort Dodge	Signed as exits 142A (east) and 142B (west)
Hamilton	Williams Township	144.038	231.807	144	CR D25 – Williams, Blairsburg, Ellsworth Community College	Former US 20
Hamilton	Williams Township	147.046	236.648	147	CR D20 – Iowa Falls, Alden	
Wright	Vernon Township	151.369	243.605	151	CR R75 – Woolstock	
Franklin	Morgan Township	159.862	257.273	159	CR C47 – Dows	Former Iowa 72
Franklin	Scott Township	165.670	266.620	165	Iowa 3 – Clarion, Hampton	Access to Franklin General Hospital
Franklin	Marion Township	170.114	273.772	170	CR C25 – Alexander	
Franklin	Richland Township	176.301	283.729	176	CR C13 – Sheffield, Belmond	
Cerro Gordo	Pleasant Valley Township	179.924	289.560	180	CR B65 – Thornton	
Cerro Gordo	Pleasant Valley Township	182.471	293.659	182	CR B60 – Rockwell, Swaledale	
Cerro Gordo	Mount Vernon Township	188.518	303.390	188	CR B43 – Burchinal	
Cerro Gordo	Lake Township	190.749– 191.193	306.981– 307.695	190	US 18 east / Iowa 27 south (Avenue of the Saints) – Charles City, Mason City	Southern end of US 18/Iowa 27 overlap
Cerro Gordo	Clear Lake	193.194	310.916	193	I-35 Business Loop north / CR B35 – Clear Lake, Mason City	
Cerro Gordo	Clear Lake	194.063	312.314	194	US 18 west / I-35 Business Loop south / Iowa 122 east – Mason City, Clear Lake	Northern end of US 18 overlap; access to MercyOne North Iowa Medical Center, Mason City Municipal Airport, and North Iowa Area Community College
Cerro Gordo	Lincoln Township	197.753	318.253	197	CR B20 – Mason City	
Worth	Danville Township	203.675	327.783	203	Iowa 9 – Manly, Forest City	
Worth	Brookfield Township	208.691	335.856	208	CR A38 – Joice, Kensett	
Worth	Hartland Township	214.712	345.545	214	CR 105 – Lake Mills, Northwood	Former Iowa 105
Worth	Hartland Township	218.532	351.693		I-35 north (Avenue of the Saints) / Iowa 27 ends – Minneapolis	Northern end of Iowa 27 (and overlap); continuation into Minnesota
1.000 mi = 1.609 km; 1.000 km = 0.621 mi: Concurrency terminus; Incomplete access

== See also ==
- 80/35 Music Festival

Interstate 35
Previous state: Missouri	Iowa	Next state: Minnesota
