= Jamison, Iowa =

- Unincorporated community
- Location within Iowa
- Coordinates: 41°07′18″N 93°43′30″W
- Country: United States
- State: Iowa
- County: Clarke
- Elevation: 965 ft (294 m)
- Time zone: UTC-6 (Central (CST))
  - Summer (DST): UTC-5 (CDT)
- Area code: 641
- GNIS feature ID: 457911

Jamison is an unincorporated community in Fremont Township, Clarke County, Iowa, United States.

== Geography ==
Jamison is located along Pacific Street, 6.4 miles (10.3 km) north-northeast of Osceola.

== History ==
Founded in the 1800s, Jamison's population was 61 in 1902, and 65 in 1925. The population was 65 in 1940.

== See also ==
- Lacelle, Iowa
