= Hopeville, Iowa =

- Unincorporated community
- Location within Iowa
- Coordinates: 40°56′34″N 93°59′48″W
- Country: United States
- State: Iowa
- County: Clarke
- Elevation: 1,191 ft (363 m)
- Time zone: UTC-6 (Central (CST))
  - Summer (DST): UTC-5 (CDT)
- Area code: 641
- GNIS feature ID: 457651

Hopeville is an unincorporated community in Doyle Township, Clarke County, Iowa, United States.

== Geography ==
Hopeville is located along County Highway H45, 13.5 miles (21.7 km) west-southwest of Osceola.

== History ==
The population of Hopeville was 82 in 1940.

== See also ==
- Smyrna, Iowa
