= Iowa Highway 105 =

Former state highway in Iowa, United States

Iowa Highway 105
- Iowa 105 highlighted in red

Route information
- Length: 34.23 mi (55.09 km)
- Existed: July 1, 1920–December 31, 1992

Major junctions
- West end: US 69 in Lake Mills
- I-35 near Northwood
- East end: US 218 in St. Ansgar

Location
- Country: United States
- State: Iowa
- Counties: Winnebago; Worth; Mitchell

Highway system
- Iowa Primary Highway System; Interstate; US; State; Secondary; Scenic
← Iowa 102	→ Iowa 107

Iowa Highway 105 (Iowa 105) was an east–west route which ran 34 miles (55 km) from Lake Mills to St. Ansgar in northern Iowa. Since January 1, 1993, Iowa 105 has been known as County Road 105 (CR 105). County Road 105 was the first county road in Iowa to not follow the standard alphanumeric route numbering system.

== Route description ==
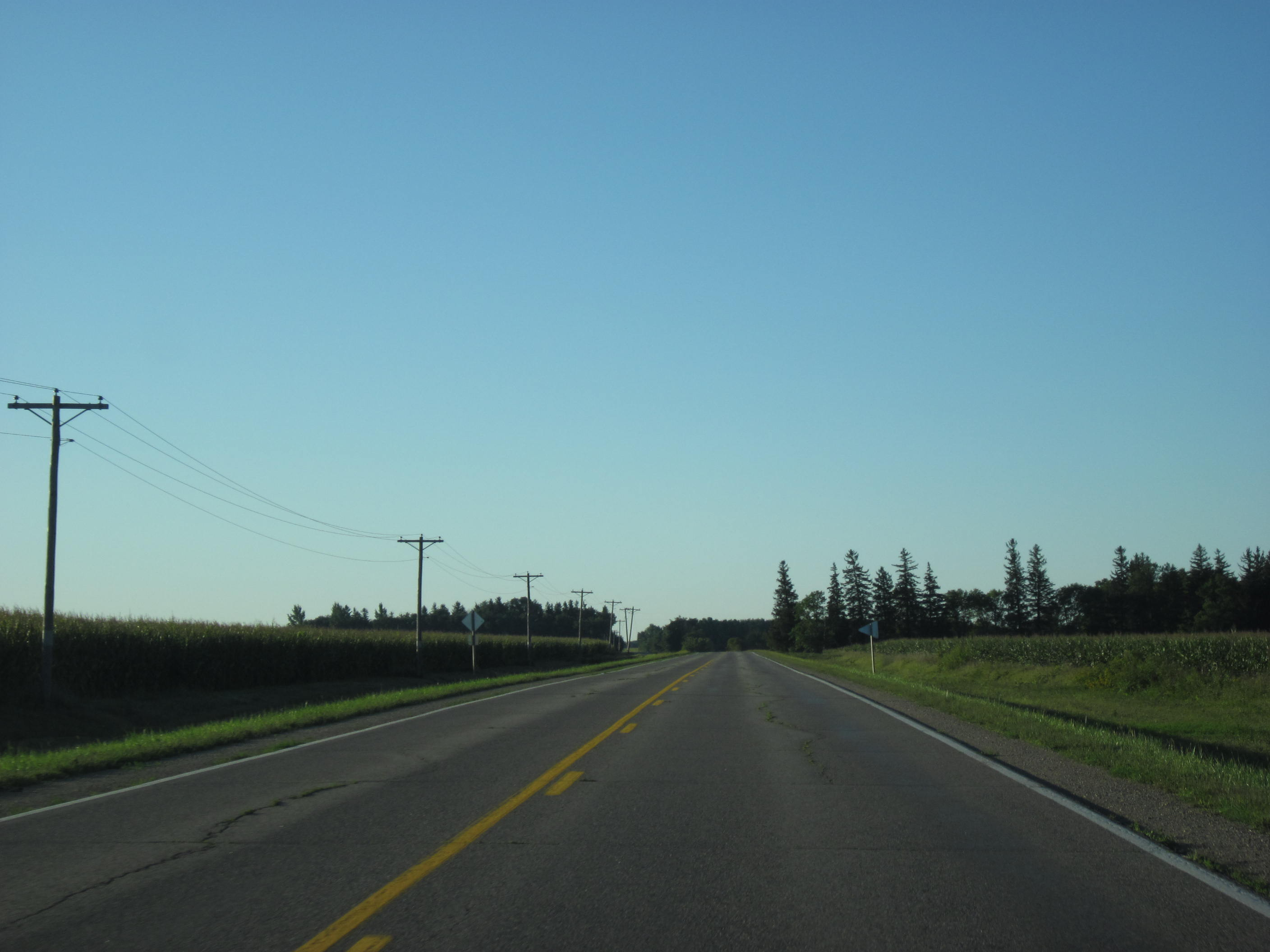
CR 105 passes through the rural farmland of northern Iowa

Iowa 105 began in Winnebago County at the intersection of Lake Street and Main Street in Lake Mills. Northbound U.S. Route 69 (US 69) traffic approached the intersection on Main Street and turned north at Lake Street; Iowa 105 began eastbound on Main Street. At the intersection today, Interstate 35 (I-35) is signed using CR 105 as a connector route. Just outside Lake Mills, Iowa 105 entered Worth County. It met I-35 at exit 214, the northernmost exit in Iowa. Now located at this exit is the Top of Iowa welcome center. Seven miles (11 km) east of the I-35 interchange, Iowa 105 entered Northwood along Central Avenue. At Eighth Street, it intersected southbound U.S. Route 65. US 65 and Iowa 105 overlapped each other for two blocks, ending at Sixth Street, when US 65 turned south again.

Iowa 105 continued eastward towards Carpenter. Just west of Carpenter, the highway crossed into Mitchell County. One mile (1.6 km) east of Carpenter, Iowa 105 intersected Mitchell County Road S70, which travels 6 miles (9.7 km) north and connects to Minnesota State Highway 105. East of the intersection with CR S70, the highway traveled southeast towards St. Ansgar. It entered St. Ansgar along Main Street, before turning east on Fourth Street. Iowa 105 crossed a Canadian National Railway line before ending at U.S. Route 218 just 100 yards (91 m) later.

== History ==
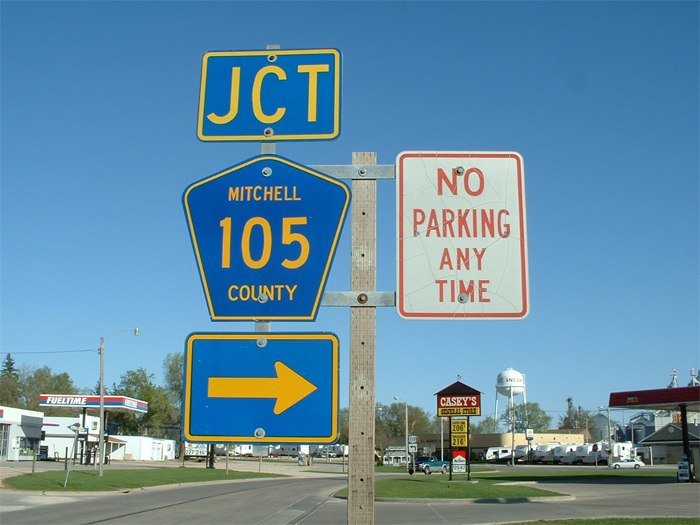
Eastern terminus at St. Ansgar

Iowa Highway 105 was an original state highway designated in 1920. During its 72-year-long existence, Iowa 105's route changed very little. On December 31, 1992, most of Iowa 105 was turned over to Worth and Mitchell Counties. All of Iowa 105 in Winnebago County became Iowa Highway 971. Sections of Iowa 105 in Northwood and St. Ansgar became Iowa 972 and Iowa 973, respectively. The rest of Iowa 105 was designated County Road 105 by Worth and Mitchell Counties. CR 105 was the first numeric county route designation since Iowa began giving county routes an alphanumeric designation, e.g. County Road E41.

== Major intersections ==
County	Location	mi	km	Destinations	Notes
Winnebago	Lake Mills	0.00	0.00	US 69 – Forest City, Albert Lea	
Worth	Hartland Township	10.27	16.53	I-35 – Mason City, Minneapolis	
Worth	Northwood	16.87	27.15	US 65 north – Albert Lea	Western end of US 65 overlap
Worth	Northwood	17.00	27.36	US 65 south – Mason City	Eastern end of US 65 overlap
Mitchell	St. Ansgar	34.23	55.09	US 218 – Osage, Austin	
1.000 mi = 1.609 km; 1.000 km = 0.621 mi: Concurrency terminus
