= Jackson Township, Clarke County, Iowa =

Township in Iowa, US

Jackson Township
- Township
- Location in Clarke County
- Coordinates: 41°01′32″N 093°37′10″W
- Country: United States
- State: Iowa
- County: Clarke

Area
  - Total: 36.8 sq mi (95.4 km^{2})
  - Land: 36.8 sq mi (95.4 km^{2})
  - Water: 0 sq mi (0 km^{2}) 0%
- Elevation: 1,080 ft (330 m)

Population (2000)
  - Total: 577
  - Density: 16/sq mi (6/km^{2})
- GNIS feature ID: 0468096

Jackson Township is a township in Clarke County, Iowa, USA. As of the 2000 census, its population was 577.

== Geography ==
Jackson Township covers an area of 36.83 square miles (95.4 km^{2}) and contains one incorporated settlement, Woodburn. According to the USGS, it contains four cemeteries: Lewis, Ottawa, Saint Marys and Woodburn.

The stream of Brush Creek runs through this township.
