= Smyrna, Iowa =

- Unincorporated community
- Location within Iowa
- Coordinates: 40°56′32″N 93°36′35″W
- Country: United States
- State: Iowa
- County: Clarke
- Elevation: 1,093 ft (333 m)
- Time zone: UTC-6 (Central (CST))
  - Summer (DST): UTC-5 (CDT)
- Area code: 641
- GNIS feature ID: 461716

Smyrna is an unincorporated community in Franklin Township, Clarke County, Iowa, United States. Smyrna is located at the intersection of county highways H50 and R69, 4.7 miles (7.6 km) south of Woodburn.

== History ==
Smyrna's population was 44 in 1902.
