= Weldon station =

- Missouri, Iowa & Nebraska Railway Co. Depot-Weldon
- U.S. National Register of Historic Places
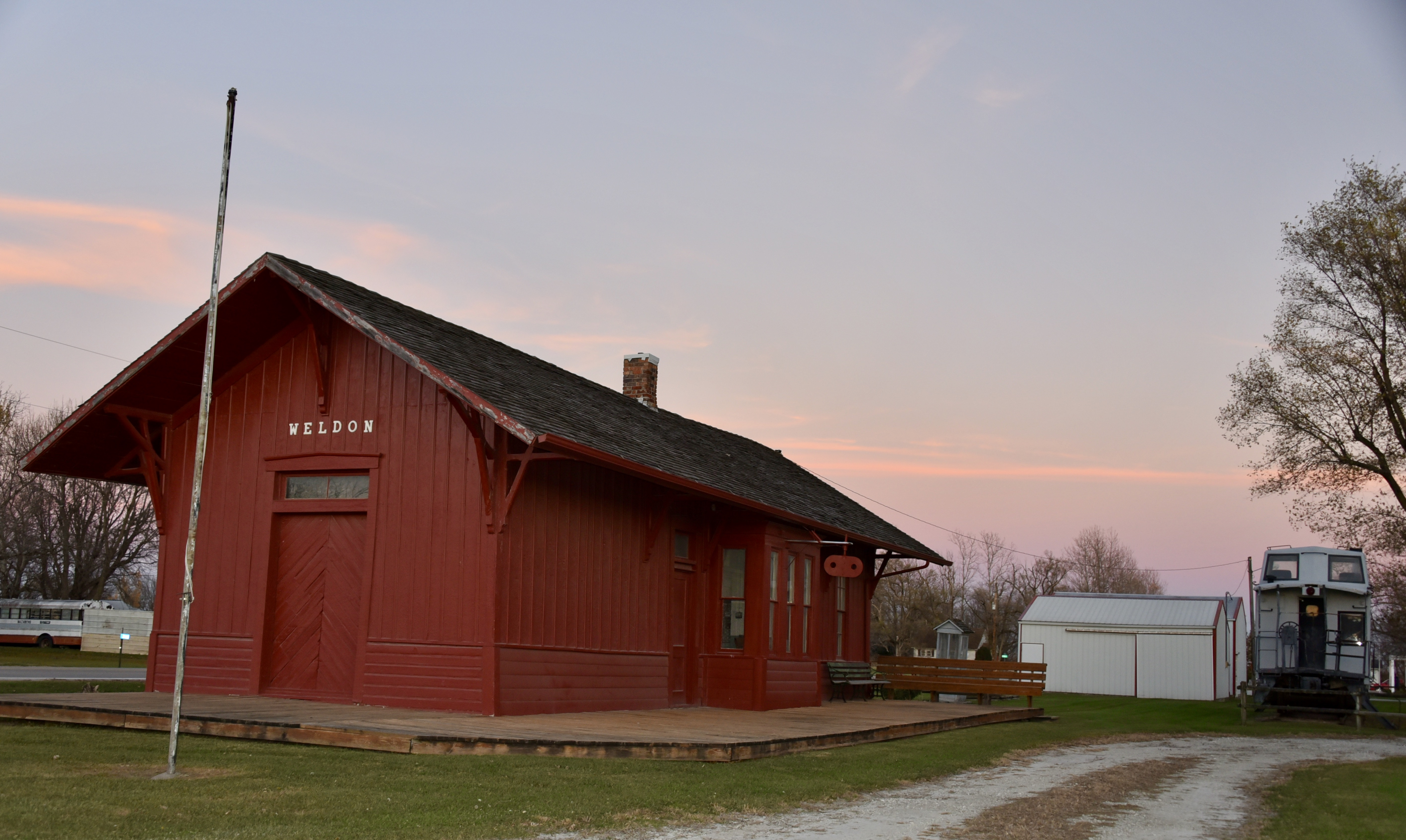
- The former depot building in Weldon during sunset

- Location within Iowa Location within the United States
- Location: N. Main St. at the Decatur County line, Weldon, Iowa
- Coordinates: 40°53′57″N 93°44′04″W
- Area: less than one acre
- Built: 1880-1881
- Architects: Missouri, Iowa & Nebraska Railway Co.
- MPS: Advent & Development of Railroads in Iowa MPS
- NRHP reference No.: 91001827
- Added to NRHP: December 13, 1991

Weldon Station (also known as the Missouri, Iowa & Nebraska Railway Depot) is a historic former railroad depot located in Weldon, Iowa, United States. The Missouri, Iowa, and Nebraska Railway Company (MI&N) was established in 1870 with the merger of the Alexandria and Nebraska City Railroad Company and the Iowa Southern Railway under the direction of Francis M. Drake. The MI&N decided to extend the line from Corydon, Iowa to Van Wert. J.P. Kline sold the railroad 70 acres (28 ha) of farmland on which the town of Weldon was founded. The railroad began construction of the Weldon Depot in 1880, the same year the town was laid out. The depot was completed the following year. The MI&N was reorganized in 1886 as the Keokuk & Western Railroad. They operated the rail line through Weldon until 1901 when it became part of the Chicago, Burlington & Quincy Railroad. Passenger service continued in Weldon until December 1945. The last freight train went through the station in January 1946. The tracks were torn out when the railroad ceased service on the line. The depot was given to the town of Weldon, which maintains it. It was added to the National Register of Historic Places in 1991.

The depot is a single-story, frame structure the measures 18.5 by 51 feet (5.6 by 15.5 m). The building's original foundation was made up of railroad tie pilings set in the ground. It was replaced in 1989. The exterior walls are composed of vertical barn board and batten siding. It is capped with a gable roof, with wooden brackets under the eaves.
