= Green Bay Township =

Green Bay Township may refer to the following townships in the United States:

- Green Bay Township, Clarke County, Iowa
- Green Bay Township, Lee County, Iowa
