= Iowa Highway 152 =

Highway in Iowa

Iowa Highway 152
- Iowa 152 highlighted in red

Route information
- Maintained by Iowa State Highway Commission
- Length: 1.402 mi (2.256 km)
- Existed: 1980–2014

Major junctions
- West end: I-35 / CR R35 near Osceola
- East end: US 69 at Osceola

Location
- Country: United States
- State: Iowa
- Counties: Clarke

Highway system
- Iowa Primary Highway System; Interstate; US; State; Secondary; Scenic
← US 151	→ Iowa 160

Iowa Highway 152 (Iowa 152) was a very short route which connected Interstate 35 (I-35) and U.S. Route 69 (US 69) near Osceola, Iowa. Through Iowa, I-35 and US 69 are mostly parallel routes; Iowa 152 connected the two routes at the narrowest location between them. The route was formed in 1980 from a portion of Clarke County Road R35 and did not undergo any changes in alignment while it was designated. The highway was relinquished to Clarke County and the City of Osceola in 2014.

== Route description ==
Iowa 152 began at a diamond interchange along I-35 northwest of Osceola. CR R35 continued along the roadway to the north and west as Iowa 152 headed to the south-southeast. It passed country homes and wooded acreages along a two-lane road. Two-thirds mile (1.1 km) east of I-35, the highway curved to the south as it passed between farms. Just one-fifth mile (0.32 km) from its eastern end, it curved back to the east and crossed the city limits into Osceola. Iowa 152 ended at an intersection with US 69, which runs along Main Street in Osceola. The rural portion of the highway had an annual average daily traffic of 940 vehicles, while the portion within the city limits handled 1270 vehicles.

== History ==
Iowa 152 was designated in 1980 from a segment of CR R35. It was entirely paved upon designation and did not undergo any route changes.

In 2014, the Iowa DOT negotiated the transfer of Iowa 152 to Clarke County and the City of Osceola. Pursuant to Section 306.8 of the Iowa Code, any time the a roadway is transferred from one jurisdiction to another, the highway either must be in good condition or the transferring agency must make a one-time payment to the accepting agencies for an amount which would pay for improvements to the road. In the case of Iowa 152, the Iowa DOT paid Clarke County $2.5 million, which included the payment to the City of Osceola.

== Major intersections ==
The entire route was in Clarke County.

Location	mi	km	Destinations	Notes
Osceola Township	0.000	0.000	I-35 (Exit 36) / CR R35	Road continues as CR R35
Osceola	1.402	2.256	US 69	
1.000 mi = 1.609 km; 1.000 km = 0.621 mi
