= Liberty, Iowa =

- Unincorporated community
- Location within Iowa
- Coordinates: 41°08′43″N 93°39′15″W
- Country: United States
- State: Iowa
- County: Clarke
- Elevation: 1,060 ft (320 m)
- Time zone: UTC-6 (Central (CST))
  - Summer (DST): UTC-5 (CDT)
- Area code: 641
- GNIS feature ID: 458312

Liberty is an unincorporated community in Liberty Township, Clarke County, Iowa, United States. Liberty is located along U.S. Route 69, 9.6 miles (15.4 km) northeast of Osceola.

== History ==
Liberty's population was 53 in 1902. The population was 50 in 1940.
