= Clarke County, Iowa =

County in Iowa, United States

- County
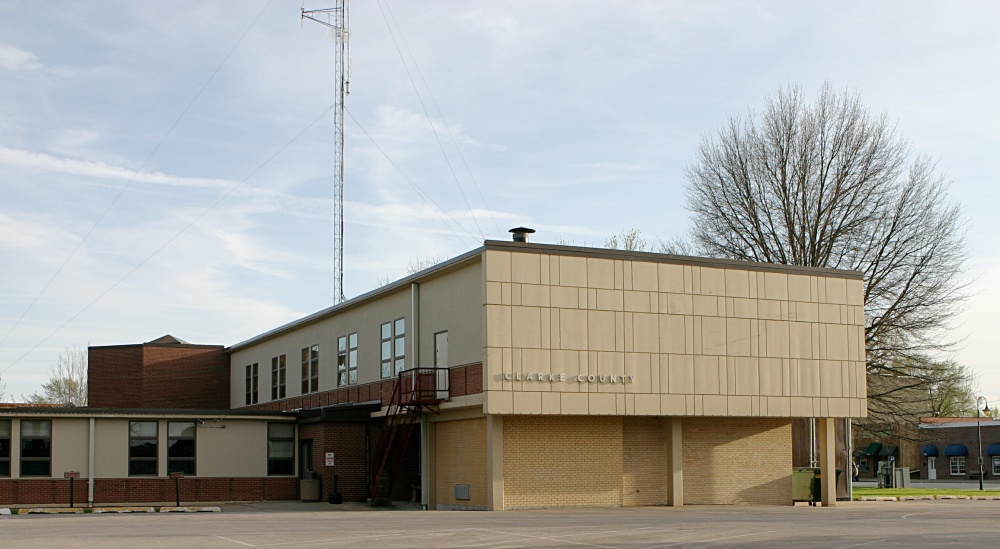
- Clarke County Courthouse in Osceola

- Location within the U.S. state of Iowa
- Coordinates: 41°01′22″N 93°47′11″W
- Country: United States
- State: Iowa
- Founded: January 13, 1846
- Named for: James Clarke
- Seat: Osceola
- Largest city: Osceola

Area
  - Total: 432 sq mi (1,120 km^{2})
  - Land: 431 sq mi (1,120 km^{2})
  - Water: 0.6 sq mi (1.6 km^{2}) 0.1%

Population (2020)
  - Total: 9,748
  - Estimate (2025): 9,574 ▼
  - Density: 22.6/sq mi (8.73/km^{2})
- Time zone: UTC−6 (Central)
  - Summer (DST): UTC−5 (CDT)
- Congressional district: 2nd
- Website: clarkecounty.iowa.gov
- Iowa county number 20

Clarke County is a county located in the U.S. state of Iowa. As of the 2020 census, the population was 9,748. The county seat is Osceola. The county was formed in January 1846, one of twelve counties established by legislative action in a comprehensive act. It was named for James Clarke, a Governor of the Iowa Territory.

== History ==
The first courthouse for Clarke County was a wood frame two–story structure in Osceola. In 1883 it was replaced with a brick structure on former park area in the town square. By the 1950s this building was insufficient, and the present modern structure was completed in 1956. It was added to the National Register of Historic Places in 2018.

== Geography ==
According to the United States Census Bureau, the county has a total area of 432 square miles (1,120 km^{2}), of which 431 square miles (1,120 km^{2}) is land and 0.6 square miles (1.6 km^{2}) (0.1%) is water.

=== Adjacent counties ===
- Decatur County (south)
- Lucas County (east)
- Madison County (northwest)
- Union County (west)
- Warren County (northeast)

=== Highways ===
- Interstate 35 – runs north–south through central Clarke County, passing Osceola
- U.S. Highway 34 – runs east–west through central Clarke County, passing Osceola
- U.S. Highway 69 – enters northeastern Clarke County, runs southwest to Osceola, then south to south line of county
- Iowa Highway 152 - short east-west connection between I-35 exit 36 and US-69 just north of Osceola

=== Transit ===
- Osceola station

== Communities ==
=== Cities ===
- Murray
- Osceola
- Woodburn

=== Unincorporated communities ===
- Hopeville
- Jamison
- Lacelle
- Liberty
- Ottawa
- Smyrna

=== Townships ===
- Doyle
- Franklin
- Fremont
- Green Bay
- Jackson
- Knox
- Liberty
- Madison
- Osceola
- Troy
- Ward
- Washington

== Demographics ==
Historical population
Census	Pop.	Note	%±
1850	79		—
1860	5,427		6,769.6%
1870	8,735		61.0%
1880	11,513		31.8%
1890	11,332		−1.6%
1900	12,440		9.8%
1910	10,736		−13.7%
1920	10,506		−2.1%
1930	10,384		−1.2%
1940	10,233		−1.5%
1950	9,369		−8.4%
1960	8,222		−12.2%
1970	7,581		−7.8%
1980	8,612		13.6%
1990	8,287		−3.8%
2000	9,133		10.2%
2010	9,286		1.7%
2020	9,748		5.0%
2025 (est.)	9,574	▼	−1.8%
U.S. Decennial Census; 1790-1960 1900-1990; 1990-2000 2010-2018

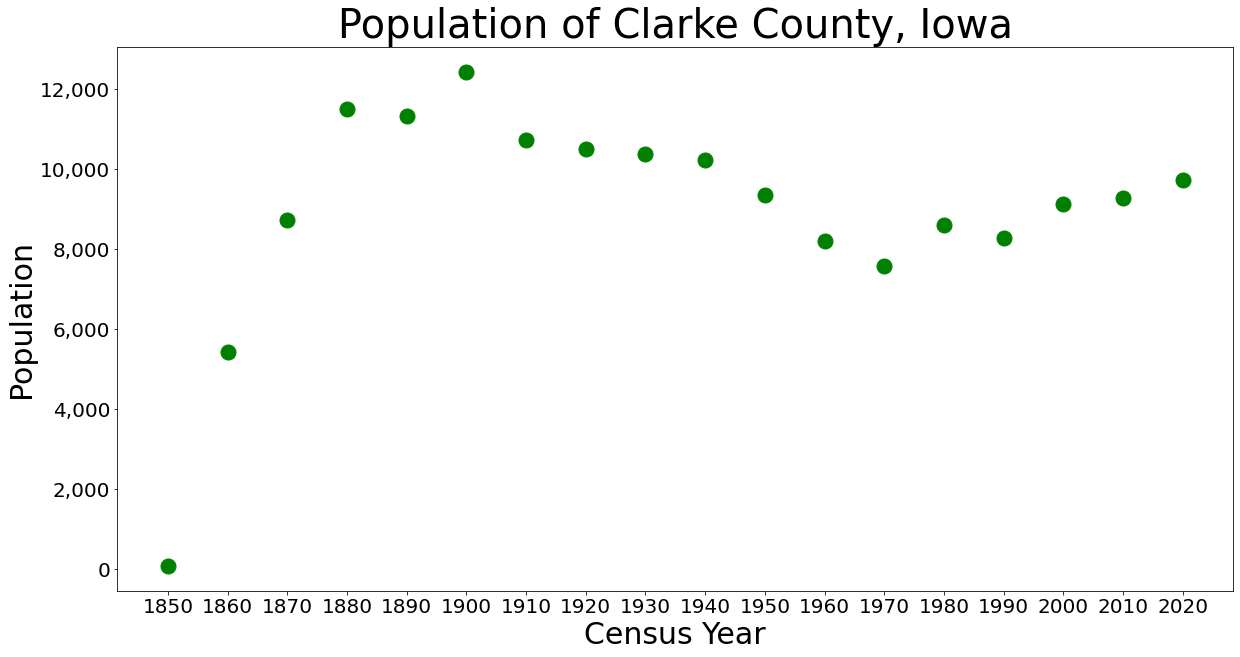
Population of Clarke County from US census data

=== 2020 census ===
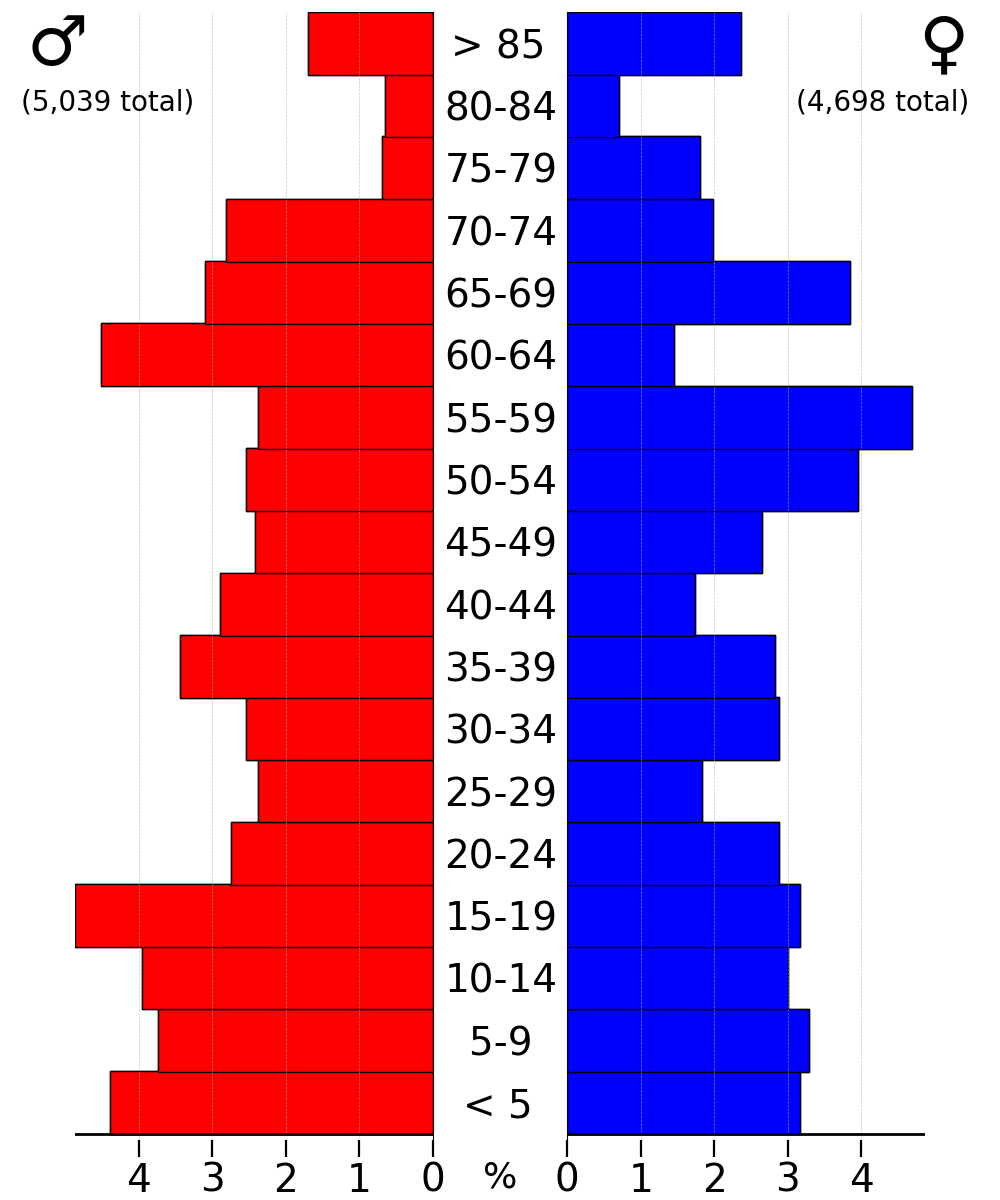
2022 US Census population pyramid for Clarke County from ACS 5-year estimates

As of the 2020 census, the county had a population of 9,748 and a population density of 22.5/sq mi (8.7/km^{2}). 93.18% of the population reported being of one race. The median age was 40.3 years, 24.8% of residents were under the age of 18, and 19.9% were 65 years of age or older. For every 100 females there were 101.5 males, and for every 100 females age 18 and over there were 99.6 males age 18 and over.

The racial makeup of the county was 84.4% White, 0.5% Black or African American, 0.6% American Indian and Alaska Native, 0.8% Asian, 0.4% Native Hawaiian and Pacific Islander, 6.5% from some other race, and 6.8% from two or more races. Hispanic or Latino residents of any race comprised 15.7% of the population.

Clarke County Racial Composition
Race	Number	Percent
White (NH)	7,837	80.4%
Black or African American (NH)	43	0.4%
Native American (NH)	7	0.07%
Asian (NH)	81	0.83%
Pacific Islander (NH)	40	0.41%
Other/Mixed (NH)	206	2.11%
Hispanic or Latino	1,534	15.73%

54.2% of residents lived in urban areas, while 45.8% lived in rural areas.

There were 3,871 households in the county, of which 29.9% had children under the age of 18 living in them. Of all households, 50.1% were married-couple households, 19.2% were households with a male householder and no spouse or partner present, and 23.0% were households with a female householder and no spouse or partner present. About 28.6% of all households were made up of individuals and 13.8% had someone living alone who was 65 years of age or older.

There were 4,268 housing units, of which 9.3% were vacant. Among occupied housing units, 69.4% were owner-occupied and 30.6% were renter-occupied. The homeowner vacancy rate was 1.7% and the rental vacancy rate was 6.6%.

=== 2010 census ===
The 2010 census recorded a population of 9,286 in the county, with a population density of 21.5/sq mi (8.3/km^{2}). There were 4,086 housing units, of which 3,701 were occupied.

=== 2000 census ===
As of the census of 2000, there were 9,133 people, 3,584 households, and 2,498 families residing in the county. The population density was 21 people per square mile (8.1 people/km^{2}). There were 3,934 housing units at an average density of 9 units per square mile (3.5 units/km^{2}). The racial makeup of the county was 96.64% White, 0.11% Black or African American, 0.33% Native American, 0.35% Asian, 0.03% Pacific Islander, 1.96% from other races, and 0.58% from two or more races. 4.04% of the population were Hispanic or Latino of any race.

There were 3,584 households, out of which 32.10% had children under the age of 18 living with them, 57.80% were married couples living together, 8.30% had a female householder with no husband present, and 30.30% were non-families. 25.90% of all households were made up of individuals, and 13.30% had someone living alone who was 65 years of age or older. The average household size was 2.50 and the average family size was 3.01.

In the county, the population was spread out, with 26.30% under the age of 18, 7.60% from 18 to 24, 26.50% from 25 to 44, 22.50% from 45 to 64, and 17.10% who were 65 years of age or older. The median age was 39 years. For every 100 females there were 97.00 males. For every 100 females age 18 and over, there were 94.00 males.

The median income for a household in the county was $34,474, and the median income for a family was $42,171. Males had a median income of $29,648 versus $20,522 for females. The per capita income for the county was $16,409. About 6.20% of families and 8.50% of the population were below the poverty line, including 12.10% of those under age 18 and 7.70% of those age 65 or over.

=== Population ranking ===
The population ranking of the following table is based on the 2020 census of Clarke County.

† county seat

Rank	City/Town/etc.	Municipal type	Population (2020 Census)
1	† Osceola	City	5,415
2	Murray	City	684
3	Woodburn	City	146
4	Weldon (mostly in Decatur County)	City	136

== Politics ==
Prior to 1988, Clarke County was a Republican-leaning swing county, only failing to back the national winner five times between 1896 & 1984. The county was reliably Democratic from 1988 to 1996 and Democratic-leaning from 2000 to 2012, but made a 29.5 point swing to back Donald Trump in 2016.

United States presidential election results for Clarke County, Iowa
Year	Republican		Democratic		Third party(ies)	
Year	No.	%	No.	%	No.	%
1896	1,646	51.53%	1,517	47.50%	31	0.97%
1900	1,800	56.69%	1,322	41.64%	53	1.67%
1904	1,799	64.57%	896	32.16%	91	3.27%
1908	1,624	58.00%	1,134	40.50%	42	1.50%
1912	882	35.44%	910	36.56%	697	28.00%
1916	1,507	55.10%	1,175	42.96%	53	1.94%
1920	3,150	70.79%	1,257	28.25%	43	0.97%
1924	2,554	52.48%	743	15.27%	1,570	32.26%
1928	2,780	61.92%	1,642	36.57%	68	1.51%
1932	1,608	39.90%	2,342	58.11%	80	1.99%
1936	2,571	48.85%	2,613	49.65%	79	1.50%
1940	2,962	53.76%	2,513	45.61%	35	0.64%
1944	2,603	56.78%	1,946	42.45%	35	0.76%
1948	2,195	50.13%	2,101	47.98%	83	1.90%
1952	3,215	65.69%	1,653	33.78%	26	0.53%
1956	2,462	55.99%	1,929	43.87%	6	0.14%
1960	2,631	57.82%	1,906	41.89%	13	0.29%
1964	1,546	36.70%	2,659	63.13%	7	0.17%
1968	2,059	51.48%	1,655	41.38%	286	7.15%
1972	2,214	56.75%	1,590	40.76%	97	2.49%
1976	1,737	41.87%	2,333	56.23%	79	1.90%
1980	2,417	54.88%	1,614	36.65%	373	8.47%
1984	2,262	52.35%	2,030	46.98%	29	0.67%
1988	1,631	41.46%	2,262	57.50%	41	1.04%
1992	1,417	33.26%	1,921	45.09%	922	21.64%
1996	1,401	35.71%	2,053	52.33%	469	11.96%
2000	1,984	47.51%	2,081	49.83%	111	2.66%
2004	2,200	48.18%	2,323	50.88%	43	0.94%
2008	2,118	47.65%	2,218	49.90%	109	2.45%
2012	2,124	47.95%	2,189	49.41%	117	2.64%
2016	2,713	60.91%	1,465	32.89%	276	6.20%
2020	3,144	67.32%	1,466	31.39%	60	1.28%
2024	3,140	70.10%	1,265	28.24%	74	1.65%

== Education ==
School districts include:

- Clarke Community School District
- East Union Community School District
- Interstate 35 Community School District
- Mormon Trail Community School District
- Murray Community School District

== See also ==
- National Register of Historic Places listings in Clarke County, Iowa
