= Washington Township, Clarke County, Iowa =

Township in Iowa, US

Washington Township
- Township
- Location in Clarke County
- Coordinates: 41°06′30″N 093°50′32″W
- Country: United States
- State: Iowa
- County: Clarke

Area
  - Total: 34.49 sq mi (89.33 km^{2})
  - Land: 34.48 sq mi (89.31 km^{2})
  - Water: 0.0077 sq mi (0.02 km^{2}) 0.02%
- Elevation: 1,043 ft (318 m)

Population (2000)
  - Total: 284
  - Density: 8.3/sq mi (3.2/km^{2})
- GNIS feature ID: 0468910

Washington Township is a township in Clarke County, Iowa, USA. As of the 2000 census, its population was 284.

== Geography ==
Washington Township covers an area of 34.49 square miles (89.3 km^{2}) and contains no incorporated settlements. According to the USGS, it contains one cemetery, Field.
