= Troy Township, Clarke County, Iowa =

Township in Iowa, US

Troy Township
- Township
- Location in Clarke County
- Coordinates: 41°01′49″N 093°57′06″W
- Country: United States
- State: Iowa
- County: Clarke

Area
  - Total: 36.1 sq mi (93.5 km^{2})
  - Land: 36.05 sq mi (93.38 km^{2})
  - Water: 0.050 sq mi (0.13 km^{2}) 0.14%
- Elevation: 1,201 ft (366 m)

Population (2000)
  - Total: 1,021
  - Density: 28/sq mi (10.9/km^{2})
- GNIS feature ID: 0468796

Troy Township is a township in Clarke County, Iowa, USA. As of the 2000 census, its population was 1,021. There are three other townships in Iowa named Troy: in Iowa, Monroe, and Wright Counties.

== Geography ==
Troy Township covers an area of 36.1 square miles (93 km^{2}) and contains one incorporated settlement, Murray. According to the USGS, it contains two cemeteries: Murray and Troy.

The stream of West Long Creek runs through this township.
