= Clarke Community School District =

Public school district in Osceola, Iowa, United States

Coordinates: 41.043675°N 93.770955°W

Location
- Osceola, Iowa Clarke County and Decatur County United States
- Coordinates: 41.043675, -93.770955

District information
- Type: Local school district
- Grades: K-12
- Superintendent: Steve Seid
- Schools: 3
- Budget: $21,771,000 (2020-21)
- NCES District ID: 1907410

Students and staff
- Students: 1358 (2022-23)
- Teachers: 102.92 FTE
- Staff: 104.36 FTE
- Student–teacher ratio: 13.19
- Athletic conference: South Central
- District mascot: Indians
- Colors: Maroon and White

Other information
- Website: www.clarkecsd.org

The Clarke Community School District is a rural public school district headquartered in Osceola, Iowa.

The district is mostly in Clarke County, with a small area in Decatur County. It serves the city of Osceola, the towns of Van Wert, Weldon, Woodburn, and the surrounding rural areas.

The school's athletic teams are the Indians, and their colors are maroon and white.

== History ==
In February the Clarke Community School District shut off drinking water in all its buildings due to a severe drought in Osceola.

== Schools ==
The district operates three schools, all in Osceola:

- Clarke Community Elementary School
- Clarke Community Middle School
- Clarke Community High School

=== Clarke Community High School ===
==== Athletics ====
The school's athletic teams are the Indians, and their colors are maroon and white. They participate in the South Central Conference in the following sports.

- Football
- Cross Country
- Volleyball
- Basketball
- Bowling
- Wrestling
- Golf
- Tennis
- Track and Field
- Baseball
- Softball
  - 2-time State Champions (1995, 2014)

== See also ==
- List of school districts in Iowa
- List of high schools in Iowa
