= Lacelle, Iowa =

- Unincorporated community
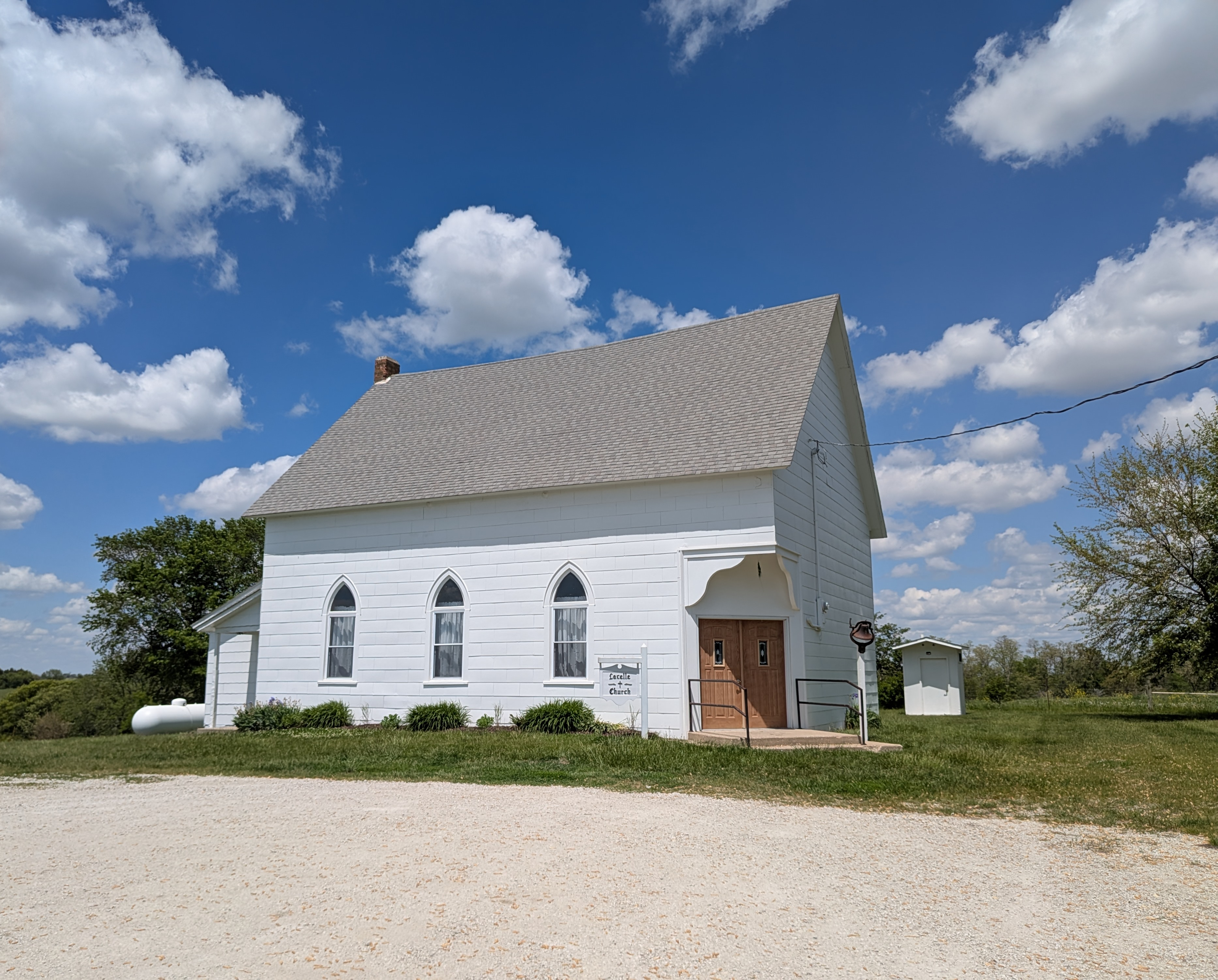
- Lacelle Church

- Location within Iowa
- Coordinates: 40°57′05″N 93°51′59″W
- Country: United States
- State: Iowa
- County: Clarke
- Elevation: 1,142 ft (348 m)
- Time zone: UTC-6 (Central (CST))
  - Summer (DST): UTC-5 (CDT)
- Area code: 641
- GNIS feature ID: 1969817

Lacelle is an unincorporated community in Knox Township, Clarke County, Iowa, United States. Lacelle is located along County Highway R25, 7.7 miles (12.4 km) southwest of Osceola.

== History ==
Lacelle's population was 25 in 1902, and 33 in 1925. The population was 33 in 1940.
