= Madison Township, Clarke County, Iowa =

Township in Iowa, US

Madison Township
- Township
- Location in Clarke County
- Coordinates: 41°06′32″N 093°57′41″W
- Country: United States
- State: Iowa
- County: Clarke

Area
  - Total: 35.96 sq mi (93.13 km^{2})
  - Land: 35.95 sq mi (93.11 km^{2})
  - Water: 0.0077 sq mi (0.02 km^{2}) 0.02%
- Elevation: 1,171 ft (357 m)

Population (2000)
  - Total: 176
  - Density: 4.9/sq mi (1.9/km^{2})
- GNIS feature ID: 0468319

Madison Township is a township in Clarke County, Iowa, USA. As of the 2000 census, its population was 176.

== Geography ==
Madison Township covers an area of 35.96 square miles (93.1 km^{2}) and contains no incorporated settlements. According to the USGS, it contains one cemetery, Union.
