= Murray, Iowa =

- City
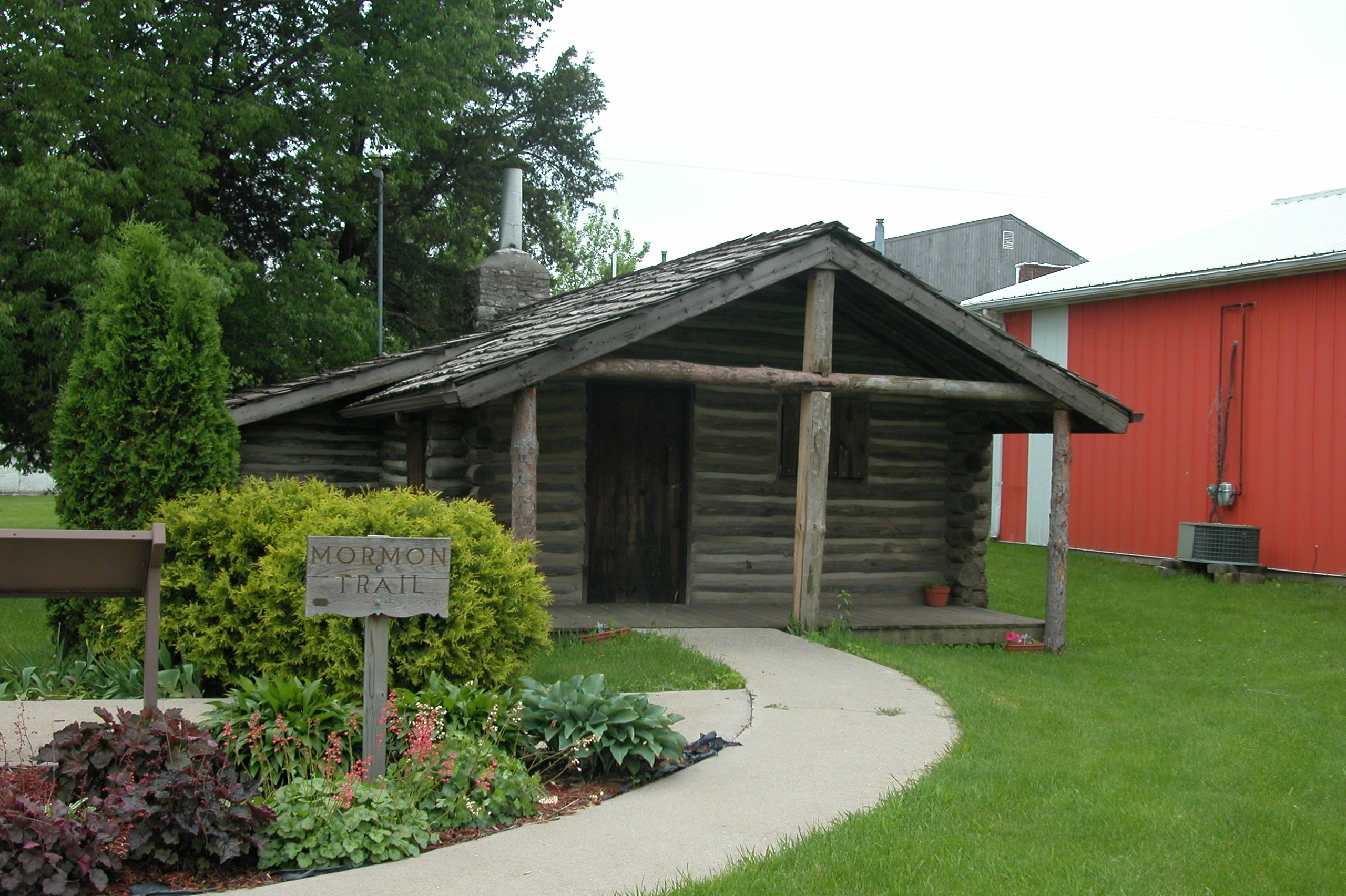
- Mormon Pioneer National Historic Trail exhibit
- Motto: Murray Matters
- Location of Murray, Iowa
- Coordinates: 41°02′29″N 93°56′56″W
- Country: USA
- State: Iowa
- County: Clarke

Government
  - Type: Mayor – Council

Area
  - Total: 0.8 sq mi (2.1 km^{2})
  - Land: 0.8 sq mi (2.1 km^{2})
  - Water: 0 sq mi (0.0 km^{2})
- Elevation: 1,217 ft (371 m)

Population (2020)
  - Total: 684
  - Density: 855.1/sq mi (330.17/km^{2})
- Time zone: UTC-6 (Central (CST))
  - Summer (DST): UTC-5 (CDT)
- ZIP code: 50174
- Area code: 641
- FIPS code: 19-55065
- GNIS feature ID: 2395142
- Website: www.murrayia.org

Murray is a city in Clarke County, Iowa, United States. The population was 684 at the time of the 2020 census.

== History ==
Murray was founded in 1868 as Oakland following the construction of the Burlington & Missouri River Rail Road through the State. The village was laid out in 1868 by Henry Clay Sigler (1830–1907) of Osceola and Smith Henderson Mallory (1835–1903) of Chariton. At that time, Oakland occupied a 120-acre (0.1875-square-mile) tract. The first U.S. Post Office in Oakland was established in the Fall of 1868 – In section 10, Troy Township. Albert ("Bert") Straub (1842–1897) was appointed postmaster November 27, 1868. Straub had been a member of Company E of the 50th Illinois Infantry Regiment and served in the Union Army during the American Civil War.

Murray was incorporated as a city Thursday, October 21, 1880 – thirty-four years after Clarke County had been established by the Territorial Legislature (January 13, 1846). Murray's first City Council meeting was held December 7, 1880. Alanson Bowers (1848–1922) served as founding mayor until March 1882.

== Geography ==
According to the United States Census Bureau, Murray has a total area of 0.8 square miles (2.1 km^{2}), all land. The city is in western Clarke County, along the historic Mormon Trail.

Driving distances from Murray:

1. Osceola, the Clarke County seat, is about 10 miles (16 km) east via U.S. Route 34. (Note: On July 31, 1948, by way of a ceremony at Red Oak, Iowa — about 71 miles (114 km) west of Murray via US-34 — US Highway 34 (the part that runs through Iowa) was dedicated as the 34th Infantry Division Memorial Highway, for the Iowans who served in the Division during World War II. Signs with the Red Bull insignia for the 34th are posted along the highway, from Burlington, Iowa, to Plattsmouth, Nebraska. The insignia was designed in 1917 by an Iowan, Marvin Dorwart Cone (1891–1965), while serving in the U.S. Army at Camp Cody, New Mexico. (Des Moines Sunday Register, July 25, 2010. 162 (6). p. 7A))
2. Des Moines is about 57.6 miles (92.7 km) north via I-35.
3. Omaha is about 122 miles (196 km) west via U.S. Route 34.

== Demographics ==
Historical populations
Year	Pop.	±%
1880	491	—
1890	666	+35.6%
1900	949	+42.5%
1910	796	−16.1%
1920	847	+6.4%
1930	828	−2.2%
1940	857	+3.5%
1950	767	−10.5%
1960	613	−20.1%
1970	620	+1.1%
1980	703	+13.4%
1990	731	+4.0%
2000	766	+4.8%
2010	756	−1.3%
2020	684	−9.5%
Source: 2020 U.S. census

=== 2020 census ===
As of the census of 2020, there were 684 people, 297 households, and 191 families residing in the city. The population density was 855.1 inhabitants per square mile (330.2/km^{2}). There were 322 housing units at an average density of 402.6 per square mile (155.4/km^{2}). The racial makeup of the city was 94.2% White, 0.4% Black or African American, 0.0% Native American, 0.1% Asian, 0.1% Pacific Islander, 2.0% from other races and 3.1% from two or more races. Hispanic or Latino persons of any race comprised 3.4% of the population.

Of the 297 households, 26.3% of which had children under the age of 18 living with them, 49.8% were married couples living together, 6.7% were cohabitating couples, 23.2% had a female householder with no spouse or partner present and 20.2% had a male householder with no spouse or partner present. 35.7% of all households were non-families. 29.6% of all households were made up of individuals, 15.5% had someone living alone who was 65 years old or older.

The median age in the city was 40.1 years. 27.0% of the residents were under the age of 20; 6.3% were between the ages of 20 and 24; 20.8% were from 25 and 44; 26.5% were from 45 and 64; and 19.4% were 65 years of age or older. The gender makeup of the city was 50.7% male and 49.3% female.

=== 2010 census ===
As of the census of 2010, there were 756 people, 310 households, and 200 families living in the city. The population density was 957.0 inhabitants per square mile (369.5/km^{2}). There were 337 housing units at an average density of 426.6 per square mile (164.7/km^{2}). The racial makeup of the city was 98.1% White, 0.5% African American, and 1.3% from other races. Hispanic or Latino of any race were 2.9% of the population.

There were 310 households, of which 31.3% had children under the age of 18 living with them, 48.4% were married couples living together, 9.4% had a female householder with no husband present, 6.8% had a male householder with no wife present, and 35.5% were non-families. 29.0% of all households were made up of individuals, and 13.9% had someone living alone who was 65 years of age or older. The average household size was 2.44 and the average family size was 2.97.

The median age in the city was 36.8 years. 26.5% of residents were under the age of 18; 7.6% were between the ages of 18 and 24; 25.8% were from 25 to 44; 25.2% were from 45 to 64; and 14.8% were 65 years of age or older. The gender makeup of the city was 49.7% male and 50.3% female.

=== 2000 census ===
As of the census of 2000, there were 766 people, 308 households, and 218 families living in the city. The population density was 977.4 inhabitants per square mile (377.4/km^{2}). There were 338 housing units at an average density of 431.3 per square mile (166.5/km^{2}). The racial makeup of the city was 98.43% White, 0.65% African American, 0.26% Native American, 0.13% Asian, 0.13% from other races, and 0.39% from two or more races. Hispanic or Latino of any race were 1.31% of the population.

There were 305 households, out of which 37.0% had children under the age of 18 living with them, 53.6% were married couples living together, 12.0% had a female householder with no husband present, and 28.9% were non-families. 26.6% of all households were made up of individuals, and 14.3% had someone living alone who was 65 years of age or older. The average household size was 2.49 and the average family size was 2.97.

In the city, the population was spread out, with 28.2% under the age of 18, 9.0% from 18 to 24, 27.2% from 25 to 44, 20.6% from 45 to 64, and 15.0% who were 65 years of age or older. The median age was 36 years. For every 100 females, there were 93.9 males. For every 100 females age 18 and over, there were 88.4 males.

The median income for a household in the city was $29,879, and the median income for a family was $37,083. Males had a median income of $27,583 versus $20,577 for females. The per capita income for the city was $14,879. About 5.0% of families and 8.2% of the population were below the poverty line, including 7.8% of those under age 18 and 14.0% of those age 65 or over.

== Notable people ==
- Meridel Le Sueur (1900–1996) – American writer associated with the proletarian movement of the 1930s and 1940s
- Glenn Parker (1898–1989) – Justice of the Wyoming Supreme Court
- Jessica Reynolds (attorney) (1979 - ) - Story County Attorney

== Historical markers ==
- Ensign Peak Foundation, Murray History Center.
- The Clarke County Freedom Rock & Honor Wall in Murray, created by renowned painter Ray “Bubba" Sorensen, Murray Cemetery off Highway 34 and County Highway R16

== Cemeteries ==
=== Murray ===
- Murray Cemetery.

Northeast corner Section 7: northeast corner of Ferdinand D. Friday (1833–1920) 240 acre tract.
Troy Township, Section 15: about 4 acres in the southwest corner of the old William Harvey Dewey (1956–1946) 76 acre tract.
135th Avenue, at the northwest corner of Route 34 and County Road R16
41.02780°N 93.94560°W

- Union Cemetery.

41.12650°N 93.91150°W

== See also ==
- Murray Community School District

== Bibliography ==
=== References ===
Books, journals, magazines, websites, papers

- Cemeteries in Clarke County, Iowa (Graves Registration Project, Works Project Administration). 1939. Retrieved April 22, 2024. Via Internet Archive (Allen County Public Library).. OCLC 43251790 (Vols. 1 & 2); OCLC 6113564 (Vols. 1 & 4).
1. Vol. 1: "A–D".
2. Vol. 1: "D–H".
3. Vol. 3: "I–P".
4. Vol. 4: "P–Z".
- Clarke County Genealogical Society (1997). Clarke County, Iowa Cemeteries. Osceola, Iowa. OCLC 35564970 (all editions).
1. Vol. 1.
2. Vol. 2.
- "Clarke County, Iowa". "Oakland" & "Murray". Appointments of U.S. Postmasters, 1832–1971 (NARA Microfilm Publication M841, 145 rolls. NAID 596306 & 17027522. Records of the Post Office Department, 1773–1971, Record Group Number 28. Washington, D.C.). Vol. 34 (ca. 1867–1874). 2010. p. 86 (digital page 419) – via Ancestry.com (National Archives Microfilm Publications).
- Hartley, William George (1942–2018); Anderson, Allen Gary (1933–1995) (October 29, 2012) [1999]. Berrett, LaMar Cecil (1926–2007) (ed.). Sacred Places: A Comprehensive Guide to Early LDS Historical Sites. Vol. 5: Iowa and Nebraska. pp. 82–83. LCCN 99-72525; ISBN 978-1-5903-8197-7, 1590-3-8197-1; OCLC 68906350, 1005479164.
- Kirkpatrick, Inez Evelyn (née Inez Evelyn Hively; 1900–1990) (1975). Stagecoach Trails in Iowa. Crete, Nebraska: J–B Publishing. p. 158 – via Internet Archive. LCCN 75-36295; ISBN 0-9161-7003-9, 978-0-9161-7003-5.
- Murray History: Celebrating Our 100th Year – Murray, Iowa; 1868–1968 – via Iowa Gen Web, Clarke County..
1. Microfilm (filmed by the Genealogical Society of Utah; 1976). Digital Genealogical Society No. 7579379; OCLC 865939525 (all editions).
- Register of Officers and Agents, Civil, Military, and Naval, of the Service of the United States. September 13, 1869. Retrieved April 22, 2024. LCCN sn91-34227; OCLC 835780796; OCLC 13733446 (all editions).
1. Via Google Books (University of Minnesota)..
2. Via Google Books (Penn State Libraries)..
- Savage (1945– ), Tom (2007). Dictionary of Iowa Place–Names. University of Iowa Press. p. 158. LCCN 2006-35801; ISBN 1-5872-9531-8, 978-1-5872-9531-7 (paperback); OCLC 297116395 (all editions)
1. Via Google Books (limited preview).
- University Journal (The) (monthly alumni publication). Vol. 18. University of Nebraska–Lincoln. May 1922. p. 10. Retrieved April 21, 2024. OCLC 551722556 (all editions).
1. Via Google Books (University of Michigan).
2. Via Hathitrust (University of Michigan).
- "Villages: Murray". Biographical and Historical Record of Clarke County, Iowa. Chicago: Lewis Publishing Company. July 1886. OCLC 1041603305 (all editions), 865955909, 865939525, & 865955909.
1. History of Murray (transcription) – via The IAGenWeb Project.
2. "Villages: Murray". pp. 525–531 – via archive.org (Allen County Public Library, Fort Wayne, Indiana).
3. "Clark County Newspapers". Murray News (transcription) – via The IAGenWeb Project.
4. "The Press". Murray News. pp. 488–489 – via archive.org (Allen County Public Library, Fort Wayne, Indiana).
News media

- Des Moines Sunday Register (The): Fuson, Kenneth ("Ken") Calvin (1956–2020) (July 25, 2010). "Red Bull Unites Generations of Iowa Solders in Time of War". Vol. 162, no. 6 (State ed.). pp. 1A, 6A–7A – via newspapers.com. LCCN sn82-15551; OCLC 1566275 (all editions).
State & Federal socioeconomic and geographic data

- GNIS: "City of Murray, Clark County, Iowa". Geographic Names Information System. United States Geological Survey, United States Department of the Interior. Entry date: February 27, 2008. Distributed January 1, 2002. Feature ID: 2395142. Retrieved June 22, 2022.
- US Census 2000 (State File 17: "Iowa"). Economics and Statistics Administration. Retrieved April 22, 2024..
1. DP-1: "Profiles of General Demographic Characteristics: Iowa". May 2001.. OCLC 60585236 (all editions)
  1. Via Census Bureau (PDF).
2. PHC-1-17: "Summary Population and Housing Characteristics". October 2002. Retrieved April 22, 2024. OCLC 1129332479; OCLC 51273055 (all editions).
  1. Via Census Bureau (PDF). October 2002.
  2. Via Google Books (Indiana University). October 2002.
  3. Via Census Bureau. May 2002. OCLC 50448644 (all editions).
3. PHC-2-17: "Summary Social, Economic, and Housing Characteristics". March 2003. Retrieved April 22, 2024. OCLC 52299535 (all editions); OCLC 58926898 (all editions); OCLC 52369198 (all editions).
  1. Part 1 – via Census Bureau (PDF).
  2. Part 1 – via Google Books (University of Virginia).
  3. Part 2 – via Census Bureau (PDF).
  4. Part 2 – via Google Books (Indiana University).
  5. Part 2 – via Google Books (DIANE Publishing Co).
4. PHC-3-17: "Population and Housing Unit Counts". July 2003. Retrieved April 22, 2024. OCLC 53171106 (all editions).
  1. Via Census Bureau (PDF). July 2003.
  2. Via Google Books (Indiana University). July 2003.
- US Census 2010 (State File 17: "Iowa"). Economics and Statistics Administration. Retrieved April 22, 2024.
1. CPH-1-17: "Summary Population and Housing Characteristics" (PDF). September 2012.; OCLC 1023510171; OCLC 841795053 (all editions).
  1. Via Census Bureau (PDF).
2. CPH-2-17: "Population and Housing Unit Counts" (PDF). August 2012.; OCLC 1023510171; OCLC 841795053 (all editions).
  1. Via Census Bureau (PDF).
- US Census 2020: "Murray City, Iowa". 2020. → "Census Data".
- "Gazetter Files" → US Census: Place Names (Iowa).
1. Gazetter File → Type: "Places". State: "Iowa". Text file: "2023_gaz_place_19.txt". FIPS (GEOID) → State: 19; Place: 55065; Combined: 19–55065.
1. "2010 Gazetteer Files".
2. "2020 Gazetteer Files".
3. "2023 Gazetteer Files".
- Iowa State Data Center (U.S. Census Data). Des Moines: State Library of Iowa. OCLC 1352409716 (all editions).
1. "Quick Facts, City Quick Facts": "Murray" (1 drop-down menu → select "Murray").
2. "Data by Source, Decennial Census, Total Population": "Total Population for Murray: 1850–2020" (2 drop-down menues: 1. Geographic Level → select "City"; 2. Geographic Name → select "Murray").
Annals of Iowa

- Third Series (quarterly). LCCN 05-32209; ISSN 2473-9006 (online); ISSN 0003-4827 (print); OCLC 1481386 (all editions).

Editor from 1939 to 1947: Ora Clark Williams (1862–1955)

1. Mott, David Charles (1858–1941) (October 1930). "Abandoned Towns, Villages and Post Offices of Iowa". Vol. 17, no. 6. pp. 435–465.; doi:10.17077/0003-4827.5529 (article); OCLC 7790170116 (article index).
  1. Via Iowa Historical Society.
  2. Via HathiTrust (University of Michigan).

Atlases

- Illustrated Historical Atlas of the State of Iowa (engraved & printed by Chas. Shober & Co., Props. of Chicago Lithographing Co.). Lakeside Building, Chicago: The Andreas Atlas Co. → Alfred Theodore Andreas (1839–1900). 1875. Retrieved April 22, 2024 – via Internet Archive (David Rumsey Historical Map Collection, Stanford Libraries). OCLC 953568217 (all editions) (book).
1. "Map of Clarke County, State of Iowa". p. 217.. OCLC 699494886, 50799955 (map).
