= Ward Township, Clarke County, Iowa =

Township in Iowa, US

Ward Township
- Township
- Location in Clarke County
- Coordinates: 41°01′28″N 093°50′28″W
- Country: United States
- State: Iowa
- County: Clarke

Area
  - Total: 32.92 sq mi (85.27 km^{2})
  - Land: 32.77 sq mi (84.88 km^{2})
  - Water: 0.15 sq mi (0.38 km^{2}) 0.45%
- Elevation: 1,142 ft (348 m)

Population (2000)
  - Total: 228
  - Density: 7.0/sq mi (2.7/km^{2})
- GNIS feature ID: 0468892

Ward Township is a township in Clarke County, Iowa, USA. As of the 2000 census, its population was 228.

== Geography ==
Ward Township covers an area of 32.92 square miles (85.3 km^{2}) and contains no incorporated settlements. According to the USGS, it contains one cemetery, Cox.
