= Weldon, Iowa =

- City
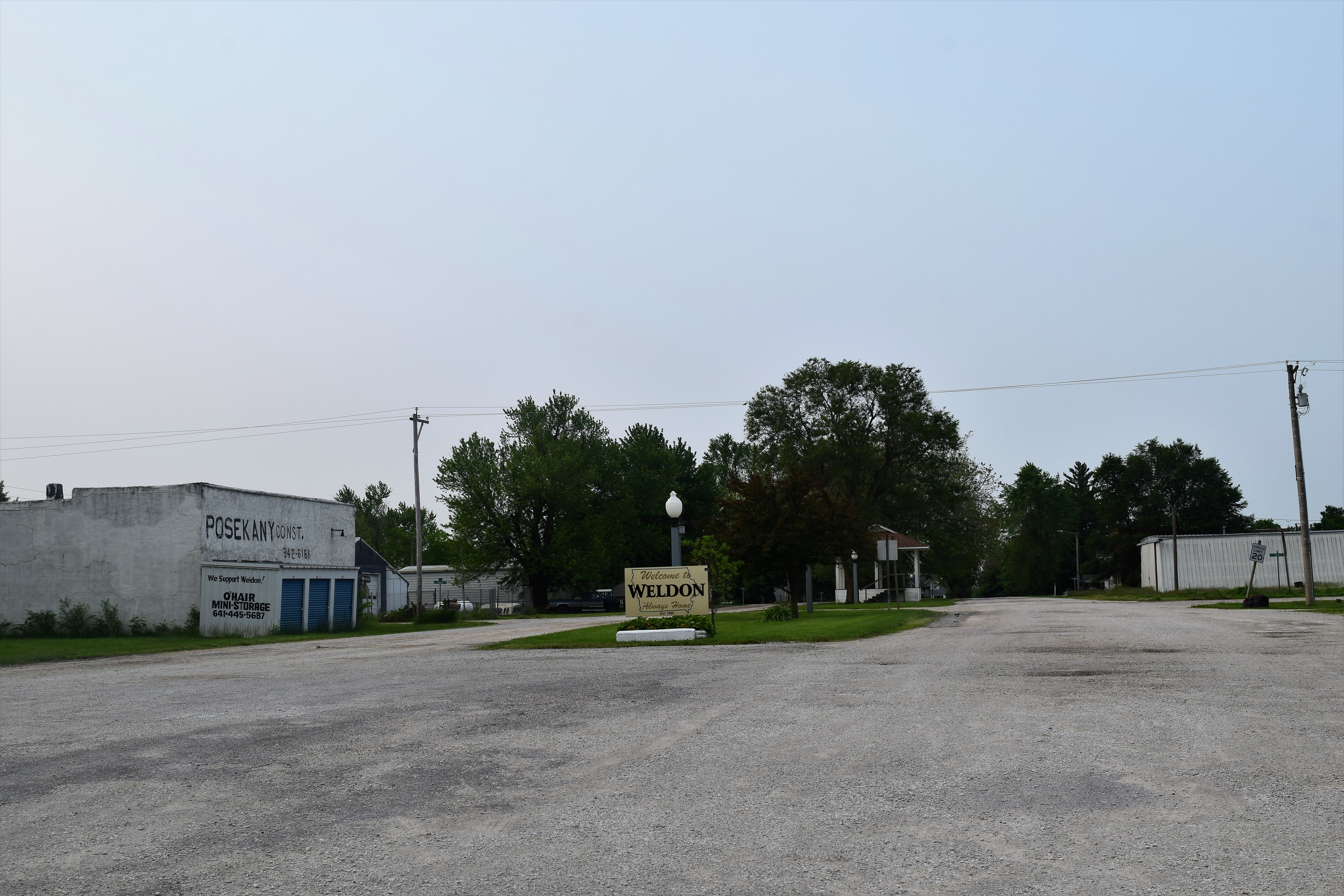
- Weldon's welcome sign

- Location of Weldon, Iowa
- Coordinates: 40°53′50″N 93°44′06″W
- Country: USA
- State: Iowa
- County: Decatur

Area
  - Total: 0.19 sq mi (0.50 km^{2})
  - Land: 0.19 sq mi (0.50 km^{2})
  - Water: 0 sq mi (0.00 km^{2})
- Elevation: 1,148 ft (350 m)

Population (2020)
  - Total: 136
  - Density: 702.0/sq mi (271.06/km^{2})
- Time zone: UTC-6 (Central (CST))
  - Summer (DST): UTC-5 (CDT)
- ZIP code: 50264
- Area code: 641
- FIPS code: 19-83190
- GNIS feature ID: 2397245

Weldon is a city in Decatur County in the U.S. state of Iowa. The population was 136 at the time of the 2020 census.

== History ==
Weldon got its start in the year 1880, following construction of the Humeston and Shenandoah Railroad through the territory. The Weldon Depot, which operated from 1881 to 1946, was listed on the National Register of Historic Places in 1991.

== Geography ==
According to the United States Census Bureau, the city has a total area of 0.18 square miles (0.47 km^{2}), all land.

== Demographics ==
Historical populations
Year	Pop.	±%
1910	308	—
1920	323	+4.9%
1930	298	−7.7%
1940	250	−16.1%
1950	229	−8.4%
1960	202	−11.8%
1970	155	−23.3%
1980	187	+20.6%
1990	151	−19.3%
2000	145	−4.0%
2010	125	−13.8%
2020	136	+8.8%
Source:"U.S. Census website". United States Census Bureau. and Iowa Data Center; Source: U.S. Decennial Census

=== 2020 census ===
As of the census of 2020, there were 136 people, 52 households, and 33 families residing in the city. The population density was 702.0 inhabitants per square mile (271.1/km^{2}). There were 58 housing units at an average density of 299.4 per square mile (115.6/km^{2}). The racial makeup of the city was 97.8% White, 0.0% Black or African American, 0.0% Native American, 0.0% Asian, 0.0% Pacific Islander, 0.0% from other races and 2.2% from two or more races. Hispanic or Latino persons of any race comprised 0.0% of the population.

Of the 52 households, 30.8% of which had children under the age of 18 living with them, 46.2% were married couples living together, 5.8% were cohabitating couples, 26.9% had a female householder with no spouse or partner present and 21.2% had a male householder with no spouse or partner present. 36.5% of all households were non-families. 26.9% of all households were made up of individuals, 13.5% had someone living alone who was 65 years old or older.

The median age in the city was 42.0 years. 27.2% of the residents were under the age of 20; 5.1% were between the ages of 20 and 24; 21.3% were from 25 and 44; 25.0% were from 45 and 64; and 21.3% were 65 years of age or older. The gender makeup of the city was 46.3% male and 53.7% female.

=== 2010 census ===
As of the census of 2010, there were 125 people, 54 households, and 31 families living in the city. The population density was 694.4 inhabitants per square mile (268.1/km^{2}). There were 58 housing units at an average density of 322.2 per square mile (124.4/km^{2}). The racial makeup of the city was 99.2% White and 0.8% Native American. Hispanic or Latino of any race were 1.6% of the population.

There were 54 households, of which 25.9% had children under the age of 18 living with them, 44.4% were married couples living together, 5.6% had a female householder with no husband present, 7.4% had a male householder with no wife present, and 42.6% were non-families. 38.9% of all households were made up of individuals, and 18.5% had someone living alone who was 65 years of age or older. The average household size was 2.31 and the average family size was 3.06.

The median age in the city was 46.4 years. 20.8% of residents were under the age of 18; 8% were between the ages of 18 and 24; 16.8% were from 25 to 44; 38.4% were from 45 to 64; and 16% were 65 years of age or older. The gender makeup of the city was 50.4% male and 49.6% female.

=== 2000 census ===
As of the census of 2000, there were 145 people, 60 households, and 39 families living in the city. The population density was 808.6 inhabitants per square mile (312.2/km^{2}). There were 69 housing units at an average density of 384.8 per square mile (148.6/km^{2}). The racial makeup of the city was 100.00% White. Hispanic or Latino of any race were 2.07% of the population.

There were 60 households, out of which 33.3% had children under the age of 18 living with them, 53.3% were married couples living together, 6.7% had a female householder with no husband present, and 35.0% were non-families. 33.3% of all households were made up of individuals, and 20.0% had someone living alone who was 65 years of age or older. The average household size was 2.42 and the average family size was 3.10.

In the city, the population was spread out, with 27.6% under the age of 18, 6.9% from 18 to 24, 29.7% from 25 to 44, 17.9% from 45 to 64, and 17.9% who were 65 years of age or older. The median age was 37 years. For every 100 females, there were 93.3 males. For every 100 females age 18 and over, there were 87.5 males.

The median income for a household in the city was $28,750, and the median income for a family was $29,205. Males had a median income of $28,250 versus $20,313 for females. The per capita income for the city was $11,315. There were 12.2% of families and 14.4% of the population living below the poverty line, including 28.0% of under eighteens and none of those over 64.

== Education ==
It is in the Clarke Community School District.
