= Doyle Township, Clarke County, Iowa =

Township in Iowa, US

Doyle Township
- Township
- Location in Clarke County
- Coordinates: 40°56′34″N 093°57′38″W
- Country: United States
- State: Iowa
- County: Clarke

Area
  - Total: 36.05 sq mi (93.37 km^{2})
  - Land: 36.03 sq mi (93.33 km^{2})
  - Water: 0.019 sq mi (0.05 km^{2}) 0.05%
- Elevation: 1,132 ft (345 m)

Population (2000)
  - Total: 200
  - Density: 5.4/sq mi (2.1/km^{2})
- GNIS feature ID: 0467741

Doyle Township is a township in Clarke County, Iowa, USA. As of the 2000 census, its population was 200.

== Geography ==
Doyle Township covers an area of 36.05 square miles (93.4 km^{2}) and contains no incorporated settlements. According to the USGS, it contains three cemeteries: Gregg, Hopeville and Sanders.

The streams of East Long Creek and West Long Creek run through this township.
