= Green Bay Township, Clarke County, Iowa =

Township in Iowa, US

Green Bay Township
- Township
- Location in Clarke County
- Coordinates: 40°56′44″N 093°44′13″W
- Country: United States
- State: Iowa
- County: Clarke

Area
  - Total: 36.56 sq mi (94.68 km^{2})
  - Land: 36.56 sq mi (94.68 km^{2})
  - Water: 0 sq mi (0 km^{2}) 0%
- Elevation: 1,129 ft (344 m)

Population (2000)
  - Total: 232
  - Density: 6.5/sq mi (2.5/km^{2})
- GNIS feature ID: 0467967

Green Bay Township is a township in Clarke County, Iowa, USA. As of the 2000 census, its population was 232.

== Geography ==
Green Bay Township covers an area of 36.56 square miles (94.7 km^{2}) and contains no incorporated settlements. According to the USGS, it contains four cemeteries: Chaney, Ellis, Green Bay and Hebron.

The streams of Hoosier Creek and North Hoosier Creek run through this township.
