= Van Wert, Iowa =

- City
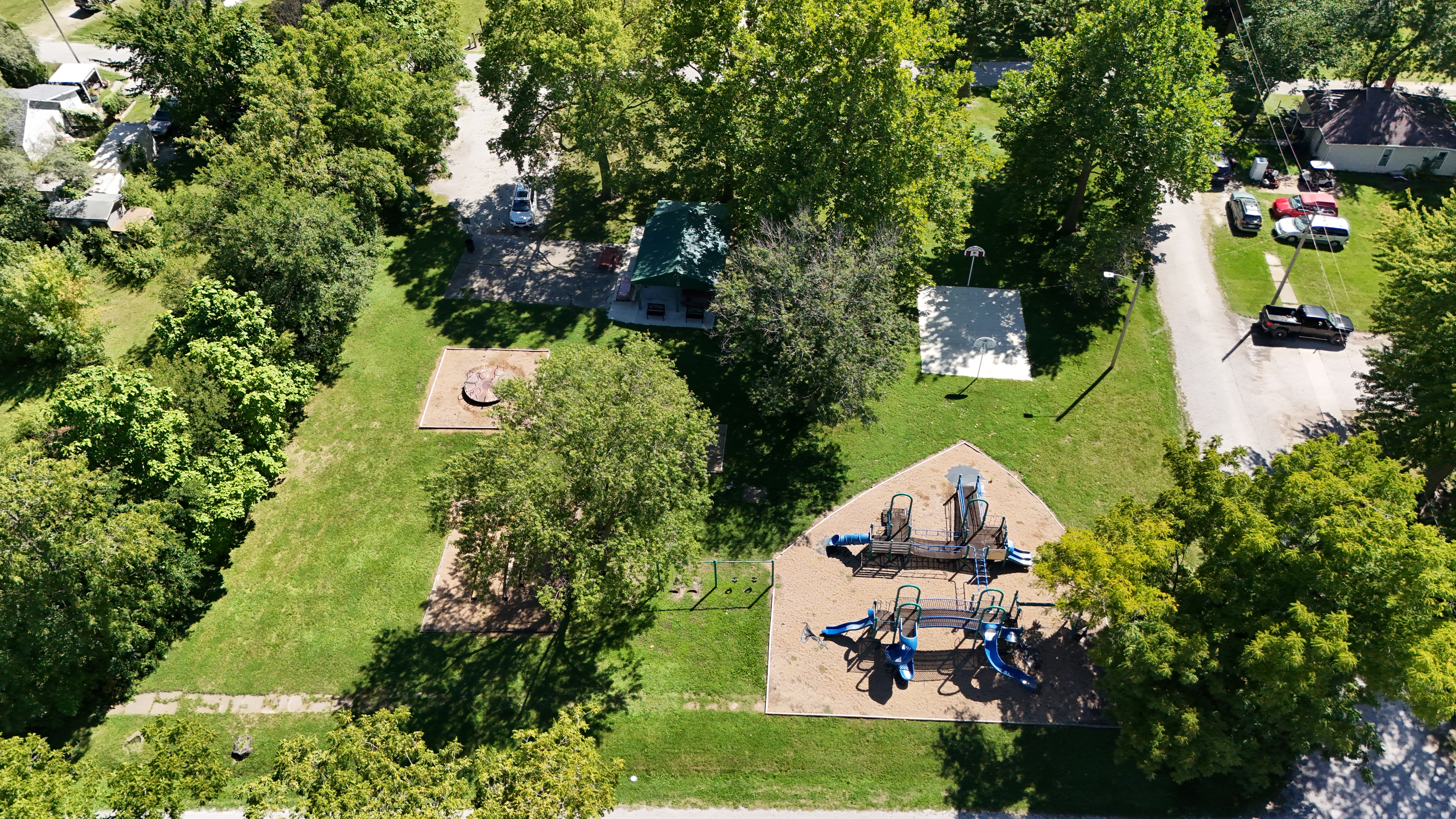
- The Van Wert city park

- Location of Van Wert, Iowa
- Coordinates: 40°52′25″N 93°47′26″W
- Country: United States
- State: Iowa
- County: Decatur

Area
  - Total: 0.36 sq mi (0.93 km^{2})
  - Land: 0.36 sq mi (0.92 km^{2})
  - Water: 0.0039 sq mi (0.01 km^{2})
- Elevation: 1,161 ft (354 m)

Population (2020)
  - Total: 178
  - Density: 500.4/sq mi (193.22/km^{2})
- Time zone: UTC-6 (Central (CST))
  - Summer (DST): UTC-5 (CDT)
- ZIP code: 50262
- Area code: 641
- FIPS code: 19-80490
- GNIS feature ID: 2397118

Van Wert is a city in northern Decatur County, Iowa, United States. The population was 178 at the time of the 2020 census.

== Geography ==
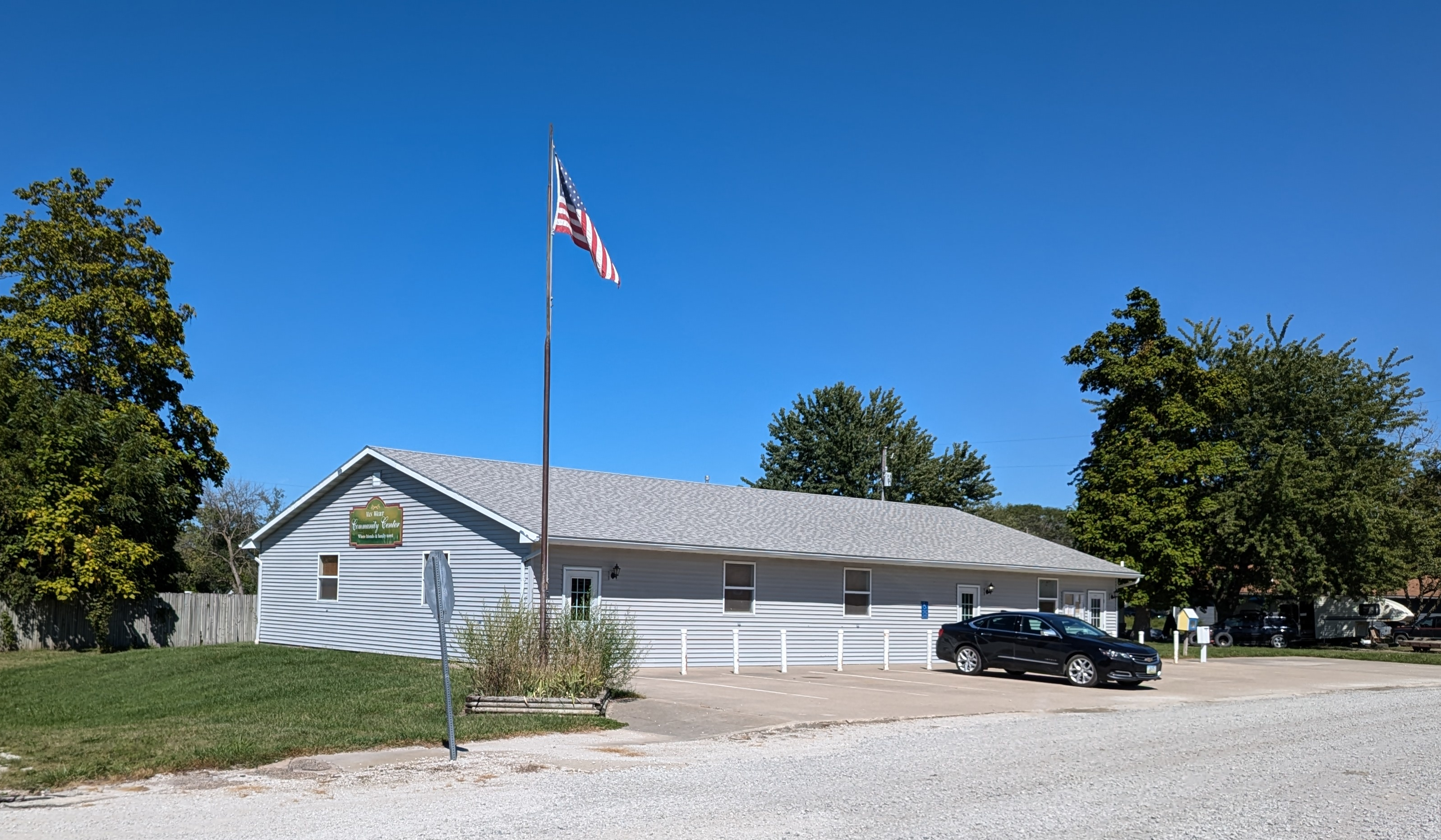
The Van Wert Community Center

Van Wert is located on Route J14 east of I-35 approximately eight miles north of Decatur City and two miles south of the Decatur-Clarke county line.

According to the United States Census Bureau, the city has a total area of 0.34 square miles (0.88 km^{2}), of which 0.33 square miles (0.85 km^{2}) is land and 0.01 square miles (0.03 km^{2}) is water.

== History ==
Van Wert was first settled in 1853. It is named after Issac Van Wart.

== Demographics ==
Historical populations
Year	Pop.	±%
1900	306	—
1910	461	+50.7%
1920	463	+0.4%
1930	369	−20.3%
1940	383	+3.8%
1950	318	−17.0%
1960	253	−20.4%
1970	244	−3.6%
1980	245	+0.4%
1990	249	+1.6%
2000	231	−7.2%
2010	230	−0.4%
2020	178	−22.6%
Source:"U.S. Census website". United States Census Bureau. and Iowa Data Center; Source: U.S. Decennial Census

=== 2020 census ===
As of the census of 2020, there were 178 people, 82 households, and 53 families residing in the city. The population density was 500.4 inhabitants per square mile (193.2/km^{2}). There were 104 housing units at an average density of 292.4 per square mile (112.9/km^{2}). The racial makeup of the city was 96.6% White, 0.0% Black or African American, 0.0% Native American, 0.0% Asian, 0.0% Pacific Islander, 1.7% from other races and 1.7% from two or more races. Hispanic or Latino persons of any race comprised 1.7% of the population.

Of the 82 households, 25.6% of which had children under the age of 18 living with them, 43.9% were married couples living together, 4.9% were cohabitating couples, 25.6% had a female householder with no spouse or partner present and 25.6% had a male householder with no spouse or partner present. 35.4% of all households were non-families. 34.1% of all households were made up of individuals, 8.5% had someone living alone who was 65 years old or older.

The median age in the city was 50.5 years. 19.7% of the residents were under the age of 20; 4.5% were between the ages of 20 and 24; 20.8% were from 25 and 44; 28.1% were from 45 and 64; and 27.0% were 65 years of age or older. The gender makeup of the city was 50.0% male and 50.0% female.

=== 2010 census ===
At the 2010 census there were 230 people in 101 households, including 73 families, in the city. The population density was 697.0 inhabitants per square mile (269.1/km^{2}). There were 119 housing units at an average density of 360.6 per square mile (139.2/km^{2}). The racial makup of the city was 96.1% White, 2.2% Native American, and 1.7% from two or more races. Hispanic or Latino of any race were 1.3%.

Of the 101 households 26.7% had children under the age of 18 living with them, 56.4% were married couples living together, 12.9% had a female householder with no husband present, 3.0% had a male householder with no wife present, and 27.7% were non-families. 21.8% of households were one person and 8.9% were one person aged 65 or older. The average household size was 2.28 and the average family size was 2.63.

The median age was 48 years. 20.9% of residents were under the age of 18; 3.8% were between the ages of 18 and 24; 21.8% were from 25 to 44; 32.2% were from 45 to 64; and 21.3% were 65 or older. The gender makeup of the city was 46.1% male and 53.9% female.

=== 2000 census ===
At the 2000 census there were 231 people in 103 households, including 64 families, in the city. The population density was 697.6 inhabitants per square mile (269.3/km^{2}). There were 120 housing units at an average density of 362.4 per square mile (139.9/km^{2}). The racial makup of the city was 99.13% White, and 0.87% from two or more races. Hispanic or Latino of any race were 0.87%.

Of the 103 households 26.2% had children under the age of 18 living with them, 55.3% were married couples living together, 4.9% had a female householder with no husband present, and 36.9% were non-families. 33.0% of households were one person and 11.7% were one person aged 65 or older. The average household size was 2.24 and the average family size was 2.85.

The age distribution was 22.1% under the age of 18, 10.8% from 18 to 24, 25.1% from 25 to 44, 26.8% from 45 to 64, and 15.2% 65 or older. The median age was 41 years. For every 100 females, there were 104.4 males. For every 100 females age 18 and over, there were 93.5 males.

The median household income was $34,375 and the median family income was $44,375. Males had a median income of $26,000 versus $18,194 for females. The per capita income for the city was $16,564. About 4.2% of families and 5.6% of the population were below the poverty line, including none of those under the age of eighteen and 17.2% of those sixty five or over.

== Education ==
It is in the Clarke Community School District.
