= Franklin Township, Clarke County, Iowa =

Township in Iowa, US

Franklin Township
- Township
- Location in Clarke County
- Coordinates: 40°56′09″N 093°36′57″W
- Country: United States
- State: Iowa
- County: Clarke

Area
  - Total: 36.51 sq mi (94.56 km^{2})
  - Land: 36.49 sq mi (94.52 km^{2})
  - Water: 0.015 sq mi (0.04 km^{2}) 0.04%
- Elevation: 1,073 ft (327 m)

Population (2000)
  - Total: 193
  - Density: 5.2/sq mi (2/km^{2})
- GNIS feature ID: 0467852

Franklin Township is a township in Clarke County, Iowa, United States. As of the 2000 census, its population was 193.

== Geography ==
Franklin Township covers an area of 36.51 square miles (94.6 km^{2}) and contains no incorporated settlements. According to the USGS, it contains four cemeteries: Blair, Clarke, Horton and Smyrna.

The stream of South White Breast Creek runs through this township.
