= Fremont Township, Clarke County, Iowa =

Township in Iowa, US

Fremont Township
- Township
- Location in Clarke County
- Coordinates: 41°07′18″N 093°44′06″W
- Country: United States
- State: Iowa
- County: Clarke

Area
  - Total: 36.29 sq mi (93.99 km^{2})
  - Land: 36.28 sq mi (93.97 km^{2})
  - Water: 0.0077 sq mi (0.02 km^{2}) 0.02%
- Elevation: 1,037 ft (316 m)

Population (2000)
  - Total: 507
  - Density: 14/sq mi (5.4/km^{2})
- GNIS feature ID: 0467877

Fremont Township is a township in Clarke County, Iowa, USA. As of the 2000 census, its population was 507.

== Geography ==
Fremont Township covers an area of 36.29 square miles (93.99 km^{2}) and contains no incorporated settlements. According to the USGS, it contains four cemeteries: Fremont, Green, Jamison and Union Chapel.

The streams of South Squaw Creek and Walnut Creek run through this township.
