= Liberty Township, Clarke County, Iowa =

Township in Iowa, US

Liberty Township
- Township
- Location in Clarke County
- Coordinates: 41°07′11″N 093°36′45″W
- Country: United States
- State: Iowa
- County: Clarke

Area
  - Total: 36.59 sq mi (94.77 km^{2})
  - Land: 36.55 sq mi (94.66 km^{2})
  - Water: 0.042 sq mi (0.11 km^{2}) 0.12%
- Elevation: 920 ft (280 m)

Population (2000)
  - Total: 373
  - Density: 10/sq mi (3.9/km^{2})
- GNIS feature ID: 0468214

Liberty Township is a township in Clarke County, Iowa, USA. As of the 2000 census, its population was 373.

== Geography ==
Liberty Township covers an area of 36.59 square miles (94.8 km^{2}) and contains no incorporated settlements. According to the USGS, it contains five cemeteries: Bethel Chapel, Harrison, Liberty, Rhodes and Twyford.

The streams of Middle Otter Creek, North Otter Creek and Victory Creek run through this township.
