= Knox Township, Clarke County, Iowa =

Township in Iowa, US

Knox Township
- Township
- Location in Clarke County
- Coordinates: 40°56′22″N 093°50′32″W
- Country: United States
- State: Iowa
- County: Clarke

Area
  - Total: 35.2 sq mi (91.1 km^{2})
  - Land: 35.11 sq mi (90.93 km^{2})
  - Water: 0.066 sq mi (0.17 km^{2}) 0.19%
- Elevation: 1,093 ft (333 m)

Population (2000)
  - Total: 202
  - Density: 5.7/sq mi (2.2/km^{2})
- GNIS feature ID: 0468170

Knox Township is a township in Clarke County, Iowa, USA. As of the 2000 census, its population was 202.

== Geography ==
Knox Township covers an area of 35.17 square miles (91.1 km^{2}) and contains no incorporated settlements. According to the USGS, it contains one cemetery, Lacelle.
