= Osceola Township, Clarke County, Iowa =

Township in Iowa, US

Osceola Township
- Township
- Location in Clarke County
- Coordinates: 41°01′54″N 093°43′57″W
- Country: United States
- State: Iowa
- County: Clarke

Area
  - Total: 32.19 sq mi (83.38 km^{2})
  - Land: 32.16 sq mi (83.29 km^{2})
  - Water: 0.035 sq mi (0.09 km^{2}) 0.11%
- Elevation: 1,102 ft (336 m)

Population (2000)
  - Total: 481
  - Density: 15/sq mi (5.8/km^{2})
- GNIS feature ID: 0468478

Osceola Township is a township in Clarke County, Iowa, USA. As of the 2000 census, its population was 481.

== Geography ==
Osceola Township covers an area of 32.19 square miles (83.4 km^{2}) and contains no incorporated settlements. According to the USGS, it contains one cemetery, Maple Hill.

== Transportation ==
Osceola Township contains one airport or landing strip, Osceola Municipal Airport.
