= Hartland Township, Worth County, Iowa =

Township in Iowa, United States

Coordinates: 43.4681°N 93.3172°W

Hartland Township is a township in Worth County, Iowa, United States.

== History ==
Hartland Township was established in 1859.
