= Woodburn, Iowa =

- City
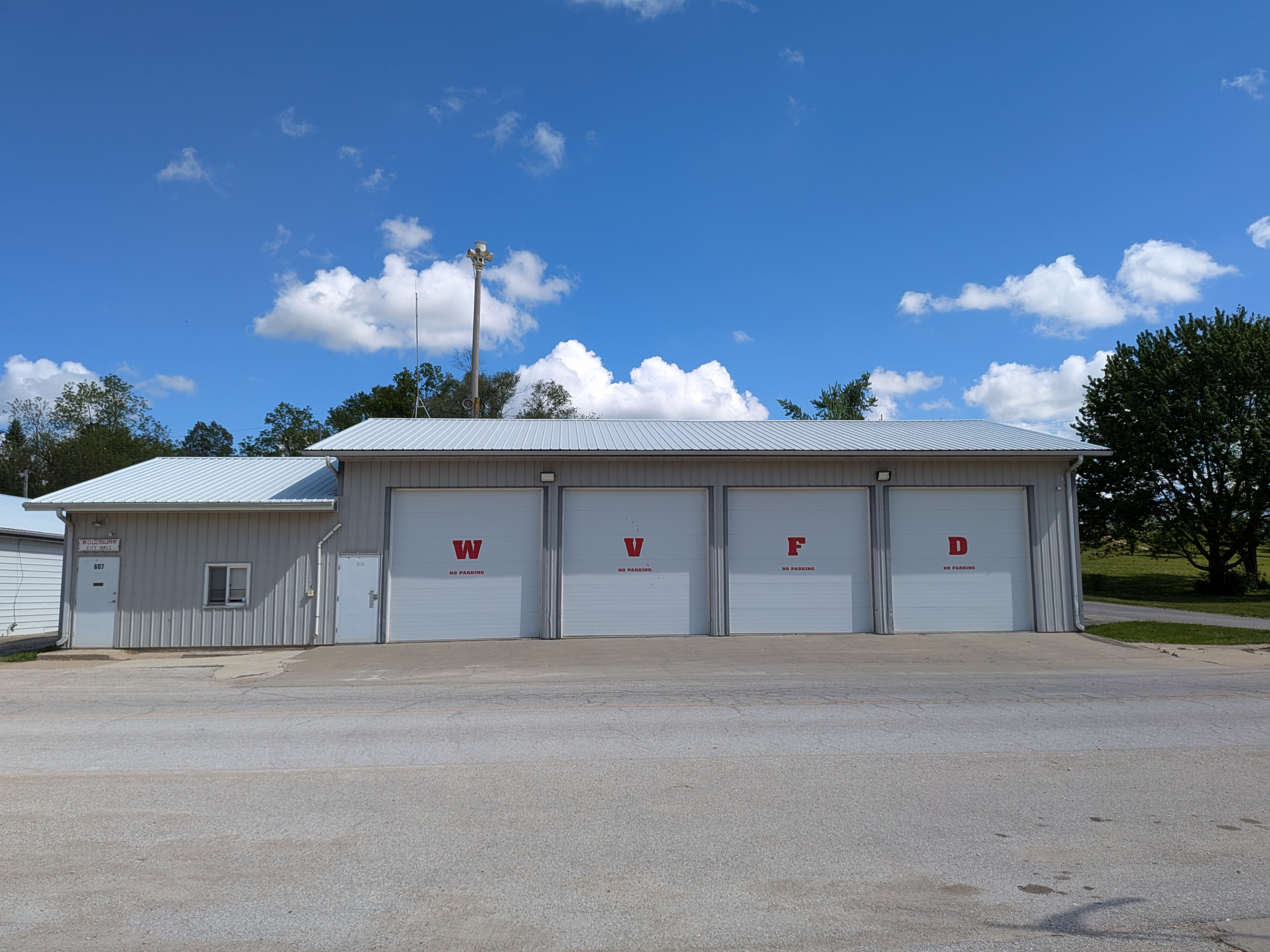
- City Hall and Fire Department

- Location of Woodburn, Iowa
- Coordinates: 41°00′39″N 93°35′47″W
- Country: USA
- State: Iowa
- County: Clarke
- Incorporated: February 12, 1878

Area
  - Total: 0.63 sq mi (1.63 km^{2})
  - Land: 0.63 sq mi (1.63 km^{2})
  - Water: 0 sq mi (0.00 km^{2})
- Elevation: 955 ft (291 m)

Population (2020)
  - Total: 146
  - Density: 231.4/sq mi (89.36/km^{2})
- Time zone: UTC-6 (Central (CST))
  - Summer (DST): UTC-5 (CDT)
- ZIP code: 50275
- Area code: 641
- FIPS code: 19-86880
- GNIS feature ID: 2397368

Woodburn is a city in Clarke County, Iowa, United States. The population was 146 at the time of the 2020 census.

== Geography ==
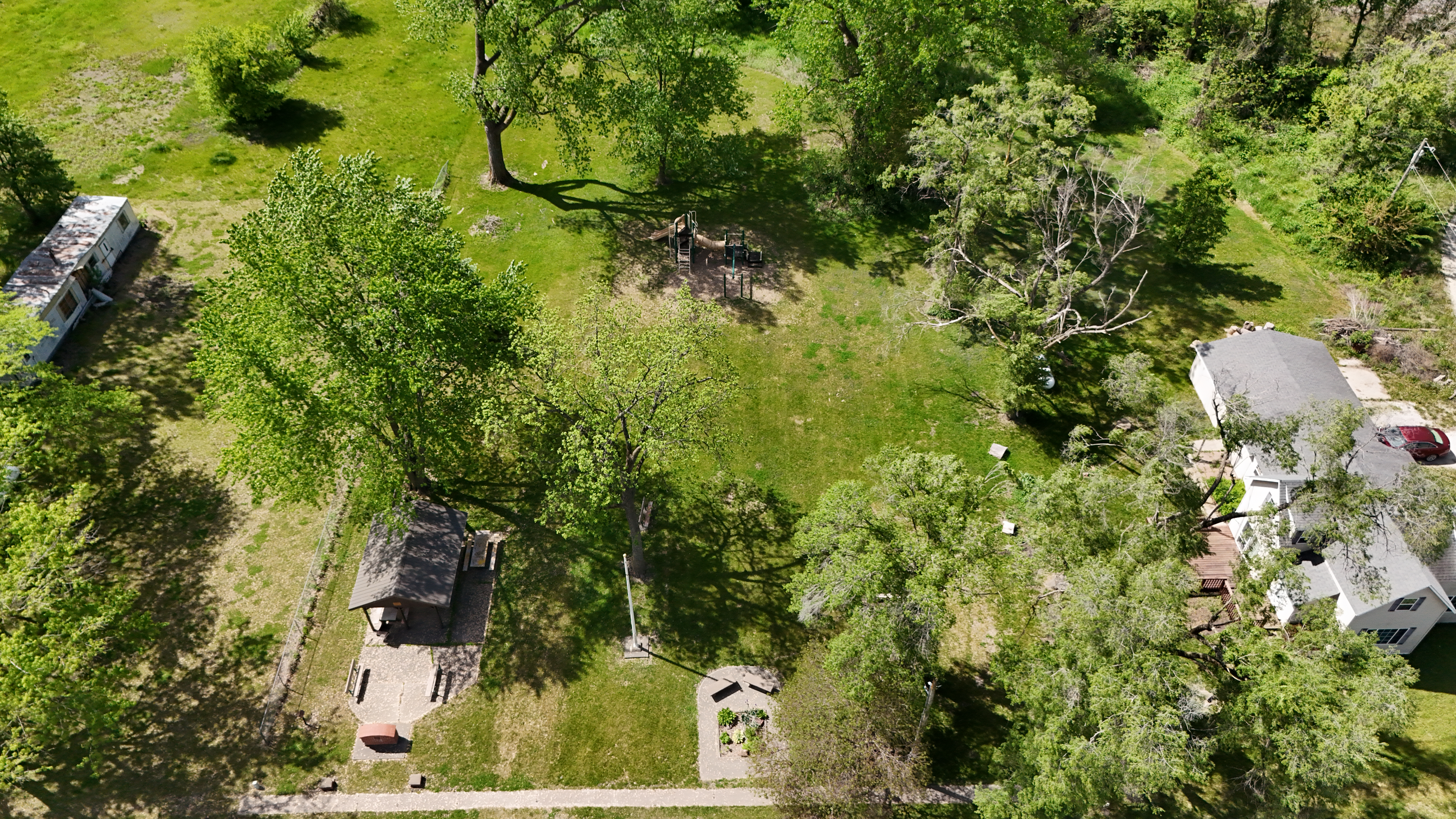
City park

According to the United States Census Bureau, the city has a total area of 0.64 square miles (1.66 km^{2}), all land.

== Demographics ==
Historical populations
Year	Pop.	±%
1880	371	—
1890	336	−9.4%
1900	467	+39.0%
1910	420	−10.1%
1920	375	−10.7%
1930	305	−18.7%
1940	324	+6.2%
1950	255	−21.3%
1960	202	−20.8%
1970	186	−7.9%
1980	207	+11.3%
1990	240	+15.9%
2000	244	+1.7%
2010	202	−17.2%
2020	146	−27.7%
Source:"U.S. Census website". United States Census Bureau. and Iowa Data Center; Source: U.S. Decennial Census

=== 2020 census ===
As of the 2020 Census, the total population was 146 people. The population density was 228.1 people per square mile, spread over 0.64 miles. Of those 146 people, the median age was 55.3 years, with 15.1% of the town's population under the age of 18, 63.1% between the ages of 18 and 64, and 21.8% of the population over the age of 65. There were a total of 65 households, with an average of 2.2 people per household.

55% of the town's population was female, with 45% of the population male. The racial makeup of the town was 93.1% White, 2% Asian, and 6.8% Hispanic.

The average income per capita of Woodburn was $15,470, which is far lower than the state average, and the median household income was $34,750, lower than the rest of the state. 10.9% of the town’s population lives under the poverty line, which is barely lower than the rest of the state.

57.9% of the population of the town is identified as currently married.

97% of the town’s population has received a high school degree, which is 4.5 percentage points higher than the rest of the state. Although Woodburn has a lower-than-average percentage of the population having received college degrees, with only 6.1% of the town's population have received college degrees compared to the state average of 30.5%.

3% of the town's population were veterans.

=== 2010 census ===
As of the census of 2010, there were 202 people, 83 households, and 59 families living in the city. The population density was 315.6 inhabitants per square mile (121.9/km^{2}). There were 89 housing units at an average density of 139.1 per square mile (53.7/km^{2}). The racial makeup of the city was 99.0% White and 1.0% Asian.

There were 83 households, of which 21.7% had children under the age of 18 living with them, 60.2% were married couples living together, 4.8% had a female householder with no husband present, 6.0% had a male householder with no wife present, and 28.9% were non-families. 21.7% of all households were made up of individuals, and 9.6% had someone living alone who was 65 years of age or older. The average household size was 2.39 and the average family size was 2.76.

The median age in the city was 45.3 years. 17.8% of residents were under the age of 18; 6.4% were between the ages of 18 and 24; 25.2% were from 25 to 44; 33.7% were from 45 to 64; and 16.8% were 65 years of age or older. The gender makeup of the city was 54.0% male and 46.0% female.

=== 2000 census ===
As of the census of 2000, there were 244 people, 89 households, and 63 families living in the city. The population density was 387.9 inhabitants per square mile (149.8/km^{2}). There were 99 housing units at an average density of 157.4 per square mile (60.8/km^{2}). The racial makeup of the city was 98.36% White, 0.41% Native American, 0.41% Asian, and 0.82% from two or more races.

There were 89 households, out of which 46.1% had children under the age of 18 living with them, 55.1% were married couples living together, 6.7% had a female householder with no husband present, and 29.2% were non-families. 22.5% of all households were made up of individuals, and 11.2% had someone living alone who was 65 years of age or older. The average household size was 2.74 and the average family size was 3.27.

In the city, the population was spread out, with 32.4% under the age of 18, 9.8% from 18 to 24, 31.1% from 25 to 44, 17.2% from 45 to 64, and 9.4% who were 65 years of age or older. The median age was 32 years. For every 100 females, there were 105.0 males. For every 100 females age 18 and over, there were 106.3 males.

The median income for a household in the city was $22,500, and the median income for a family was $30,938. Males had a median income of $24,375 versus $18,750 for females. The per capita income for the city was $11,139. About 21.5% of families and 26.8% of the population were below the poverty line, including 38.5% of those under the age of eighteen and 14.3% of those 65 or over.

== Education ==
It is in the Clarke Community School District.
