= East Park =

East Park may refer to:

Places in the UK

- East Park, Kingston upon Hull, East Riding of Yorkshire, England
- East Park, Wolverhampton, a park in Wolverhampton, West Midlands, England
- East Park (ward), an electoral ward of the Wolverhampton City Council, England
- East Park, County Antrim, a townland in County Antrim, Northern Ireland
- East Park, a former football ground in Paisley, Scotland, home of Abercorn F.C. 1877–1879

Places in the U.S.

- East Park (Mason City, Iowa), a recreational park listed on the National Register of Historic Places
- East Park Township, Minnesota, in Marshall County
- East Park (Greenville, South Carolina), a neighborhood

== See also ==
- East Park Historic District (disambiguation)
