= East Park Historic District =

East Park Historic District may refer to:

- East Park Historic District (Mason City, Iowa), listed on the National Register of Historic Places
- East Park Historic District (Greenville, South Carolina)
- East Park Historic District (Stoughton, Wisconsin)
