= East Park (Greenville, South Carolina) =

Coordinates: 34.858°N 82.390°W

East Park is a neighborhood in Greenville, South Carolina. It is located immediately north to, and adjacent of, the downtown business district. This neighborhood is part of the East Park Avenue Historic District that was listed in the National Register of Historic Places in October 2005.

Subdivided in 1910, the area reached its height of development in the 1920s and 1930s.
