= East Park Historic District (Stoughton, Wisconsin) =

Historic district in Wisconsin, US

- U.S. National Register of Historic Places
- U.S. Historic district
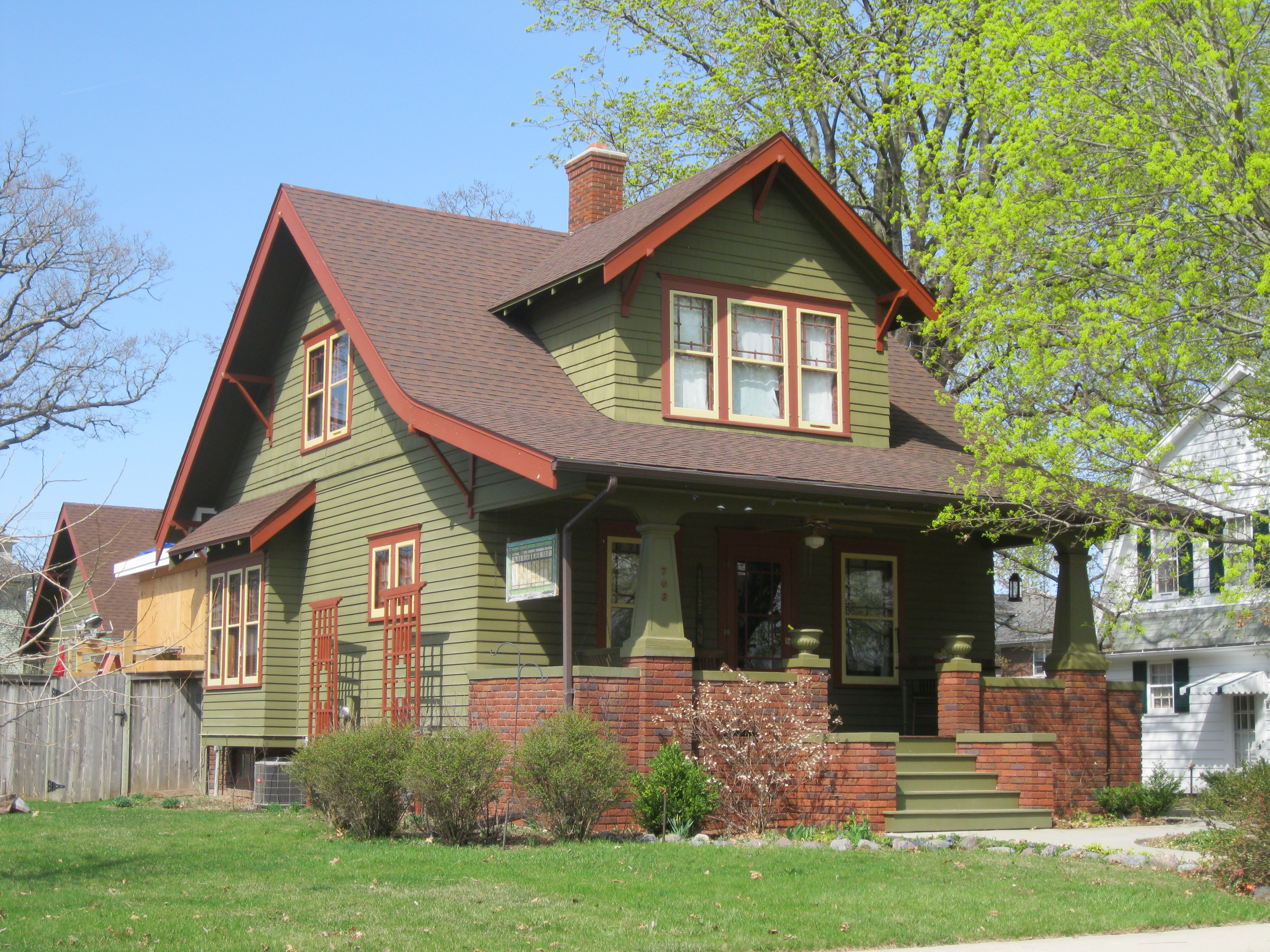
- Elling & Bertha Gilbertson House, built 1919, at 708 Park Street

- Location within Wisconsin Location within the United States
- Location: 108-324 S. Lynn St., 700-816 Park St., and East Park, Stoughton, Wisconsin
- Coordinates: 42°55′2″N 89°12′41″W
- Area: 7 acres (2.8 ha)
- Architectural style: Bungalow/Craftsman, Colonial Revival
- NRHP reference No.: 03000335
- Added to NRHP: May 1, 2003

The East Park Historic District in Stoughton, Wisconsin is a 7-acre (2.8 ha) historic district that was listed on the National Register of Historic Places in 2003.

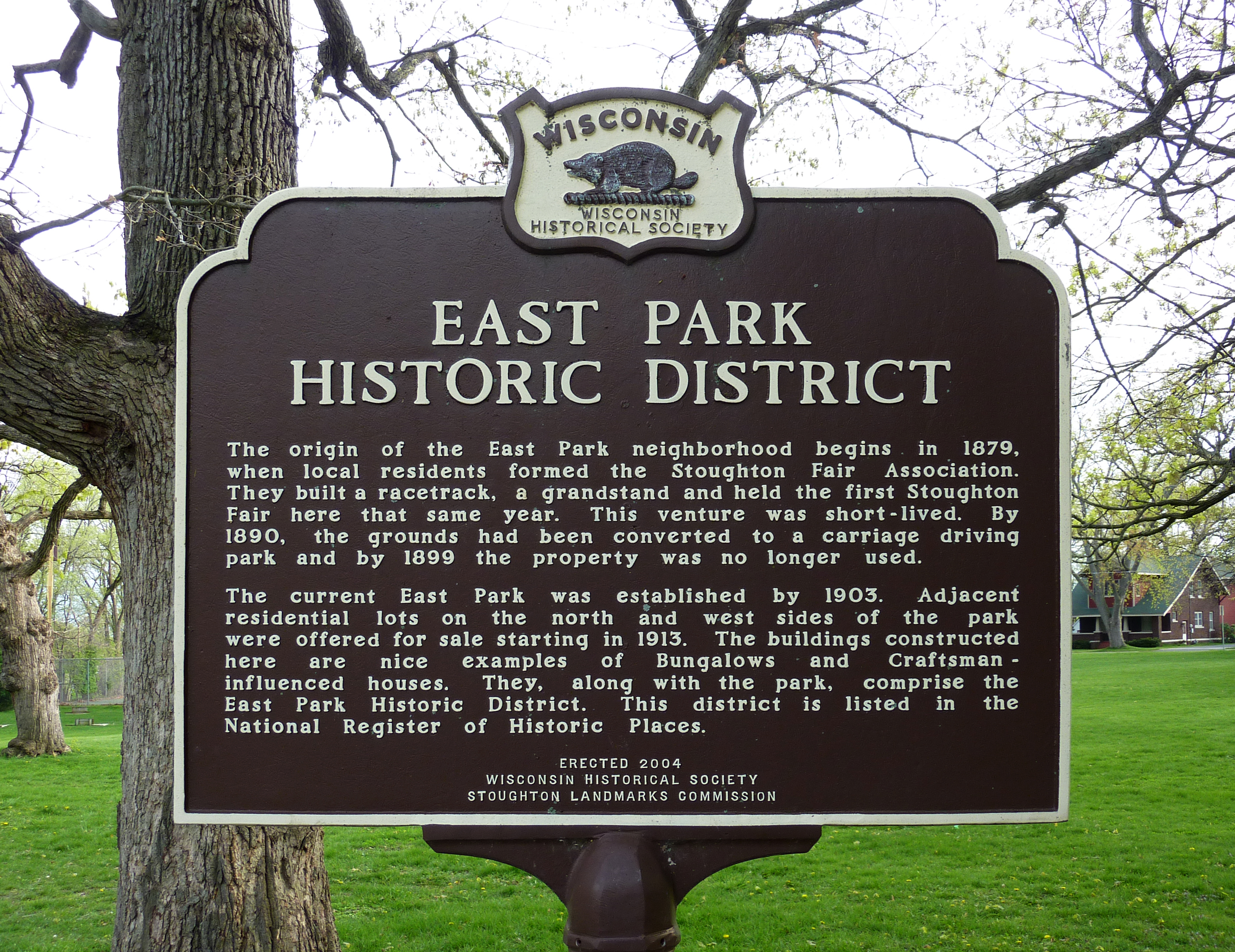
Historical marker for the district

It includes East Park and 19 contributing buildings which overlook it from the north and west. A park shelter is a non-contributing resource.

It is significant as an intact and visually distinct and cohesive group of small to medium-sized houses, mostly built between 1913 and 1921 and mostly Bungalow, Craftsman, or Craftsman-influenced in style.

Here are some good examples of the different styles in the order built:

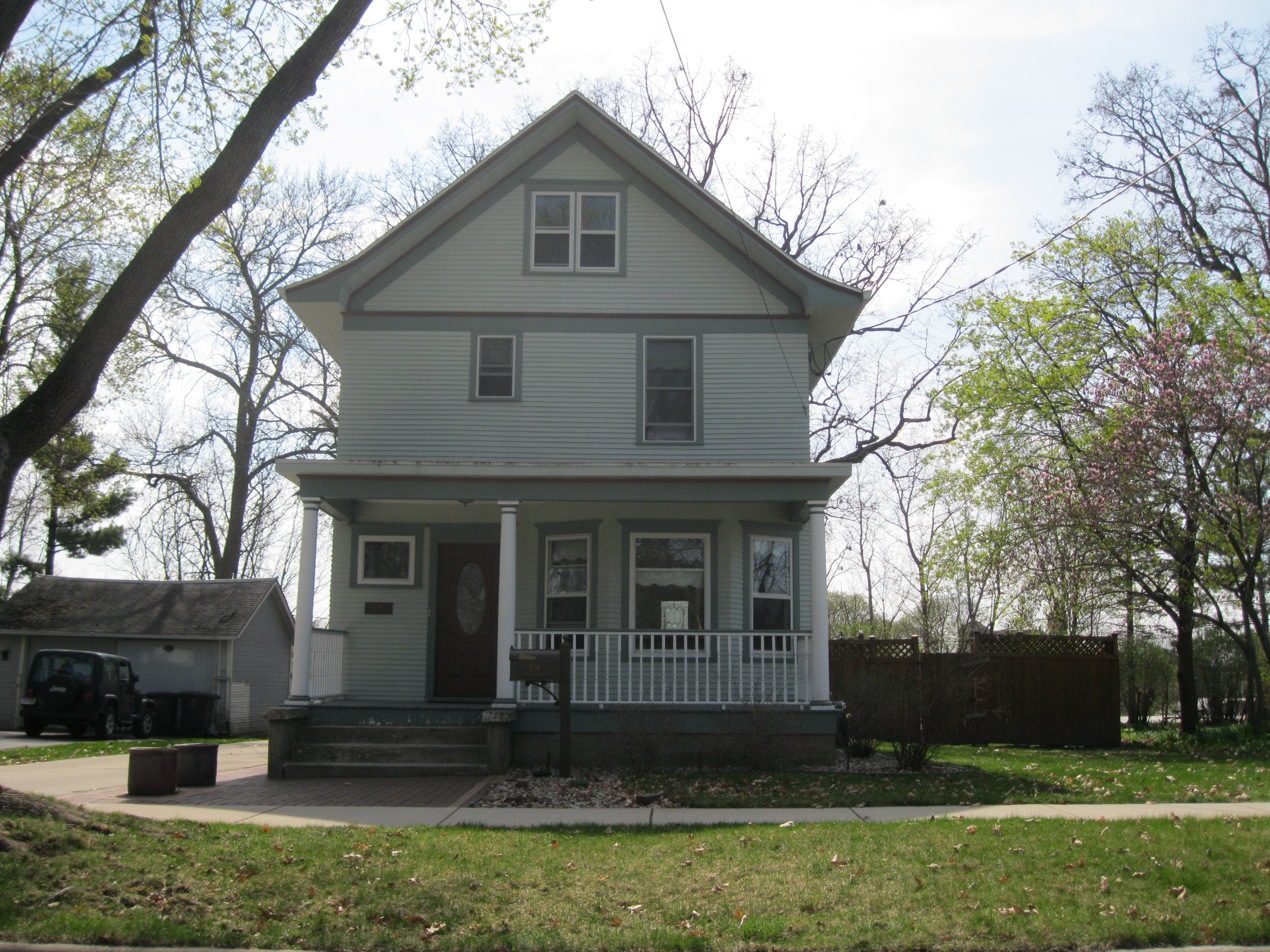
Klabo house

- The Klabo house at 216 South Lynn Street is a front-gabled home built in 1914, two stories with flared eaves, bay windows, and a full-width front porch supported by Doric columns. Peter Klabo is listed as a tobacco worker in the 1920 census; in 1930 he worked in a sawmill.
- The Bennie and Bertha Gilbertson house at 116 S. Lynn Street is an American Foursquare house built in 1915, with a basement of rock-faced concrete block, frame walls above that, and a flared hip roof with triangular-faced dormers. It has a full-width front porch with Doric columns. Ben was an immigrant from Norway who became a policeman and engineer at the public school.
- The Elling and Bertha Gilbertson house at 708 Park St. is a classic bungalow built in 1919, with a full-width open front porch enclosed with brick rails, tapered columns, clapboard siding below, shingle siding above, and knee-braces under the eaves. More houses in the district are bungalows like this than any other style.
- The Hoel house at 800 Park St. is a 1-story hip-roofed home built in 1921, with narrow clapboard siding and tapered columns supporting the front porch. Rafter tails are exposed on the dormer. Carl Hoel ran a grocery store on E. Main St.
- The Blakely house at 716 Park Street is Dutch Colonial Revival style, built in 1935. It is two stories, with the gambrel roof that is the identifying characteristic of this style. The front door is off center, flanked by sidelights and sheltered beneath a round arch. Glenn Blakely was a manager for the Brittingham and Hixon Lumber Company.
- The Brekke house at 300 South Lynn Street is a Cape Cod variant of Colonial Revival style, built in 1937, with a steep roof and front-gabled dormers. The front door is flanked by pilasters. Sverre Brekke was a Norwegian immigrant who worked as a bookkeeper.
