= East Park Historic District (Greenville, South Carolina) =

Historic district in South Carolina, United States

- U.S. National Register of Historic Places
- U.S. Historic district
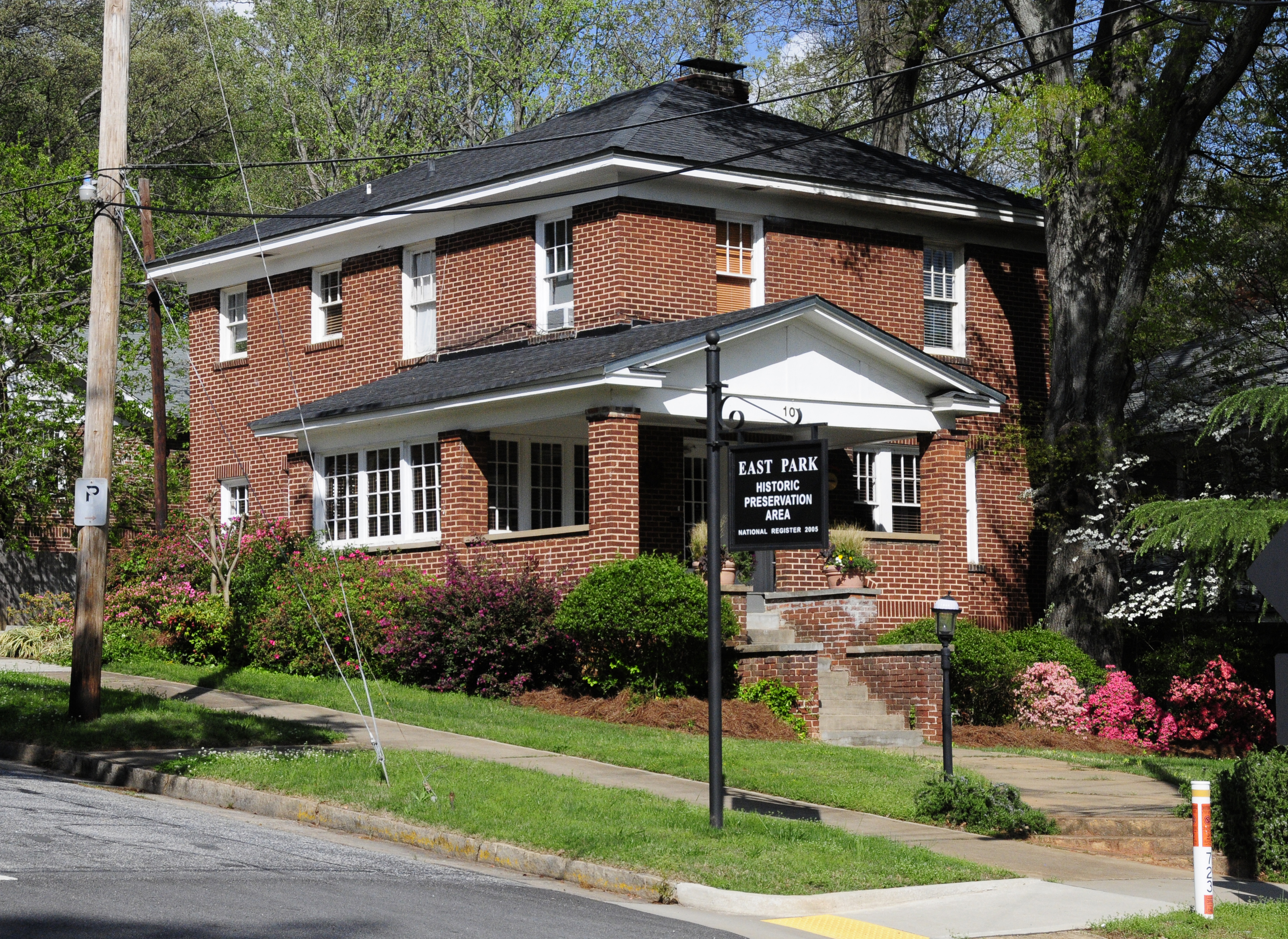
- East Park Historic District, March 2012

- Location within South Carolina Location within the United States
- Location: Roughly bounded by East Park Ave., Bennett St., Harcourt Dr., and Rowley St., Greenville, South Carolina
- Coordinates: 34°51′30″N 82°23′30″W
- Area: 57 acres (23 ha)
- Architect: Ward, William Riddle, Jr.; et.al.
- Architectural style: Late 19th And 20th Century Revivals, Late 19th And Early 20th Century American Movements
- NRHP reference No.: 05001157
- Added to NRHP: October 4, 2005

East Park Historic District is a national historic district located at Greenville, South Carolina. It encompasses 121 contributing buildings, 1 contributing site, and 3 contributing structures in a middle- / upper-class neighborhood of Greenville. The houses date from about 1908 to 1950, and include Neoclassical, Colonial Revival, Tudor Revival, Victorian, American Foursquare, Prairie Style, and bungalow styles.

It was added to the National Register of Historic Places in 2005.
