= Gifford, Iowa =

- Unincorporated community
- Location within the state of Iowa Gifford (the United States)
- Coordinates: 42°17′18″N 93°05′26″W
- Country: United States
- State: Iowa
- County: Hardin
- Elevation: 948 ft (289 m)
- Time zone: UTC-6 (Central (CST))
  - Summer (DST): UTC-5 (CDT)
- GNIS feature ID: 456897

Gifford is an unincorporated community in southeastern Hardin County, Iowa, United States.

The community was founded in 1875 and was the site of two railroad lines: the Chicago & North Western Railroad and the Iowa Central Railroad.

== Geography ==
Gifford is south of the city of Eldora, the county seat of Hardin County. It is at the junction of County Roads D55 and S62 along the Iowa River.

== History ==
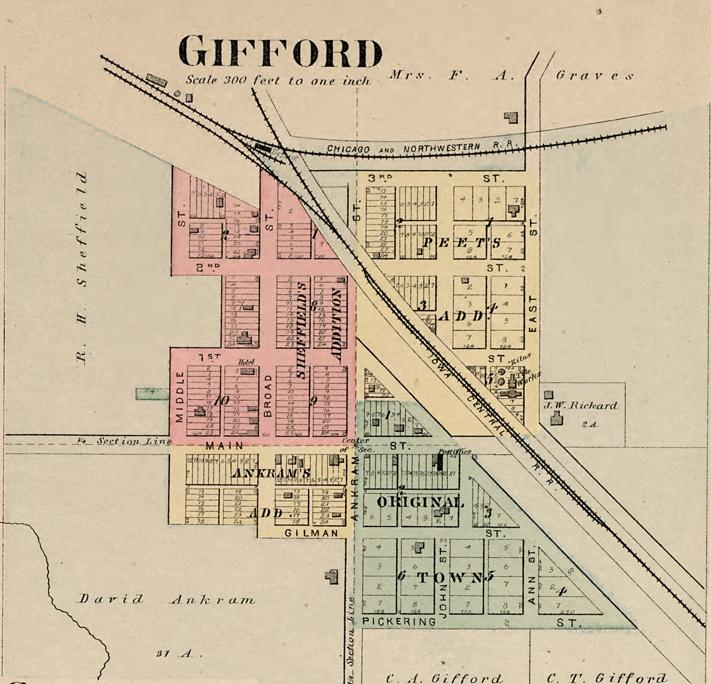
1892 Plat map of Gifford, Iowa

Gifford was laid out in 1875. It was named for C. T. Gifford, who was instrumental in bringing the railroad there. Three additions were made to Gifford in 1880: the Sheffield, Ankrum, and Peat Additions.

By 1880, Gifford was at junction of two railroads: the Chicago & North Western Railroad and the Iowa Central Railroad. In 1883, Gifford was the site of three general stores, two hotels, one butcher, one drug store, one pottery manufacturer, and one hardware store. It was also the site of the First Baptist Church of Gifford (organized in 1881), the Union Sabbath School (with 70 pupils), and a Masonic Lodge.

Gifford's post office was established on November 9, 1875, and was discontinued on February 28, 1907. Although the post office was reopened on February 17, 1908, it was again discontinued on October 31, 1954, and attached to the Union post office.

Gifford's population was 70 in 1900.

Gifford's population was 150 in 1925, and was 200 in 1940.

Although its post office is gone, Gifford has its own ZIP Code, 50259, even though the ZIP Code system was not implemented until nearly nine years after Gifford's post office was attached to Union's.

== See also ==
- Lawn Hill, Iowa
