= Quebec, Iowa =

- ghost town
- Location within Iowa Location within the United States
- Coordinates: 42°17′44″N 93°12′37″W
- Country: United States
- State: Iowa
- County: Hardin
- Time zone: UTC-6 (Central (CST))
  - Summer (DST): UTC-5 (CDT)
- Area code: 641

Quebec is a ghost town in Hardin County, Iowa, United States.

== Geography ==
Quebec was located in Pleasant Township.

== History ==
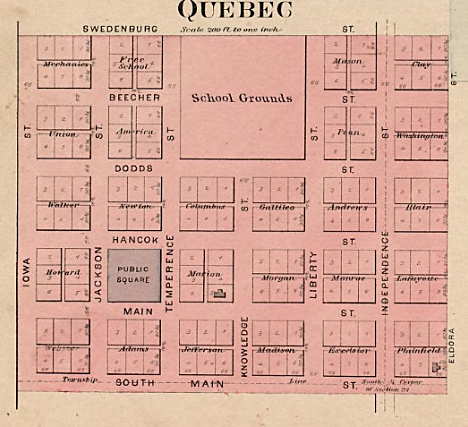
Quebec, Iowa, 1892

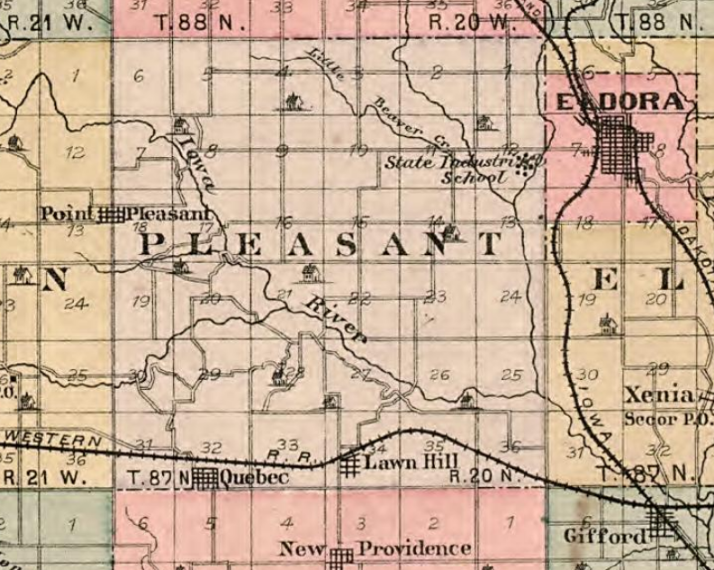
Quebec in Pleasant Township, in Hardin County, 1892

Quebec was platted in 1856 by D. B. Blair. It was located in Section 32 of the township. According to one history of the county, "The first building erected in this place [Quebec] was constructed for Marcus Blair and the first store opened by D.B. Blair. There never was a time when there were to be seen more than a half dozen houses in the hamlet."

According to the same history, the Panic of 1857 prevented Quebec from prospering.

The plat map of Quebec showed a grid of roads, with the north–south roads named Iowa Street, Jackson Street, Temperance Street, Knowledge Street, Liberty Street, Independence Street, and Eldora Street. The east–west streets were named Swedenburg Street, Beecher Street, Dodds Street, Hancok Street, Main Street, and South Main Street. Spaces for a school and public grounds were also allotted. Quebec was located in the southernmost portion of Pleasant Township, along the Chicago and North Western Railroad.

The Quebec post office operated from 1857 to 1865.

On June 3, 1860, a tornado hit southern Hardin County. While many areas of the county were affected, Quebec was solidly hit by the storm and three homes there were lost.

Another book, written in 1886, 26 years after the disaster, discusses the tornado destruction in Quebec (although it erroneously placed Quebec in Marshall County); after originating in Hardin County and hitting New Providence, "the next town on the line of destruction was Quebec [...]. This little hamlet was entirely obliterated, the houses with their contents being distributed upon the prairies. It was a marvel here that none were killed, although many were severely injured." The tornado continued east and caused further destruction across central and eastern Iowa and western Illinois.

The destroyed houses in Quebec were not restored, according to a 1953 news article.

Quebec still appeared on county maps c. 1912, when the Hardin County Ledger listed the community among other Hardin County ghost villages, including Georgetown, Hardin City, and Xenia.

== See also ==
- Cottage, Iowa
