= Hubbard, Iowa =

- City
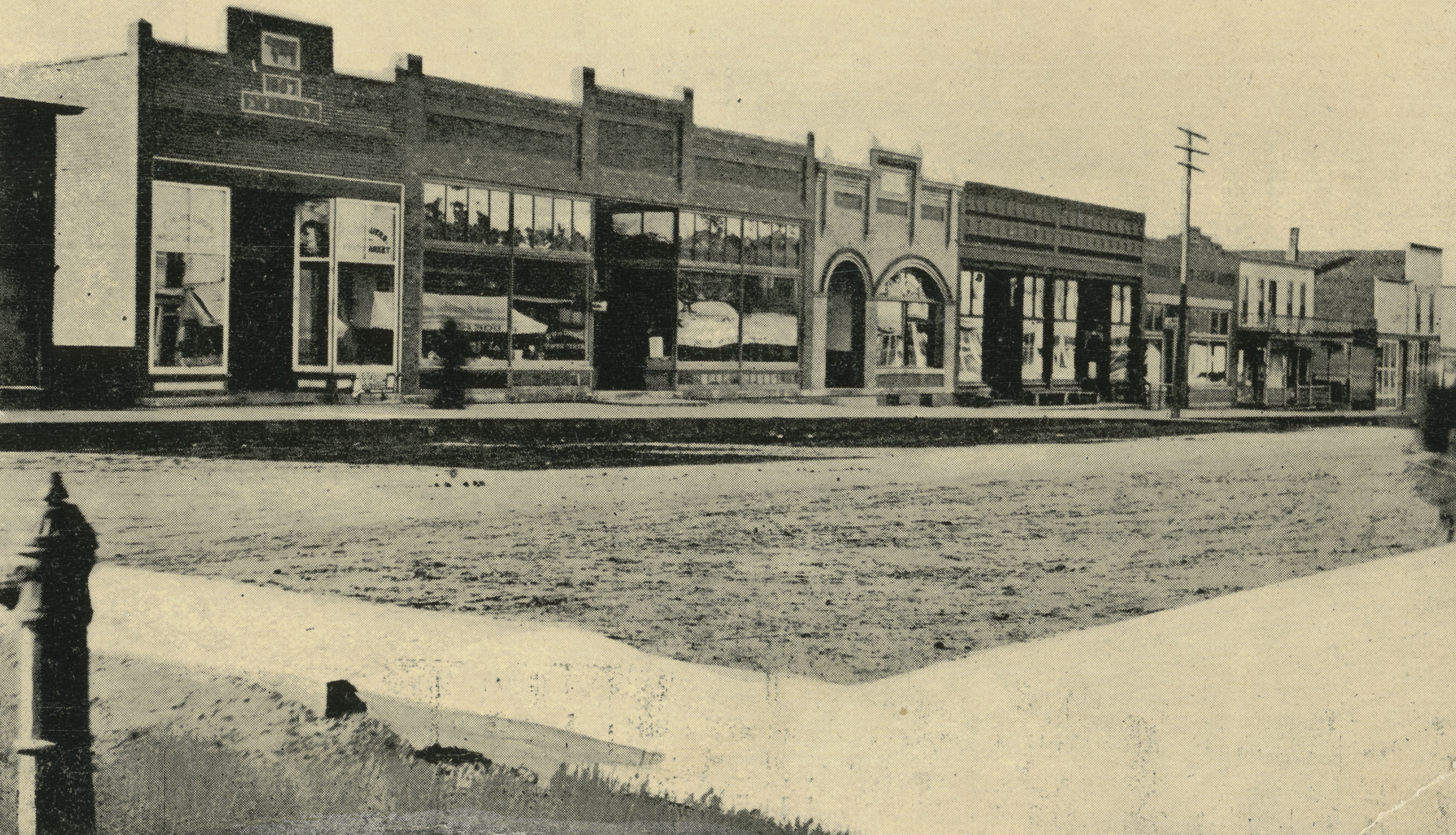
- Hubbard in 1920
- Motto: "At the Hub of it All"
- Location of Hubbard, Iowa
- Coordinates: 42°18′21″N 93°18′06″W
- Country: USA
- State: Iowa
- County: Hardin

Area
  - Total: 1.85 sq mi (4.78 km^{2})
  - Land: 1.85 sq mi (4.78 km^{2})
  - Water: 0 sq mi (0.00 km^{2})
- Elevation: 1,093 ft (333 m)

Population (2020)
  - Total: 860
  - Density: 465.6/sq mi (179.78/km^{2})
- Time zone: UTC-6 (Central (CST))
  - Summer (DST): UTC-5 (CDT)
- ZIP code: 50122
- Area code: 641
- FIPS code: 19-37425
- GNIS feature ID: 2394436
- Website: Hubbard, Iowa

Hubbard is a city in Hardin County, Iowa, United States. The population was 860 at the time of the 2020 census.

== History ==
Hubbard was settled as a community in the year 1880, following construction of the railroad through the territory. It was named for Judge Nathaniel M. Hubbard, railroad attorney.

Hubbard was incorporated on November 1, 1881.

== Geography ==
According to the United States Census Bureau, the city has a total area of 1.84 square miles (4.77 km^{2}), all land.

== Demographics ==
Historical populations
Year	Pop.	±%
1890	452	—
1900	676	+49.6%
1910	568	−16.0%
1920	681	+19.9%
1930	795	+16.7%
1940	779	−2.0%
1950	836	+7.3%
1960	806	−3.6%
1970	846	+5.0%
1980	852	+0.7%
1990	814	−4.5%
2000	885	+8.7%
2010	845	−4.5%
2020	860	+1.8%
Source:"U.S. Census website". United States Census Bureau. and Iowa Data Center; Source: U.S. Decennial Census

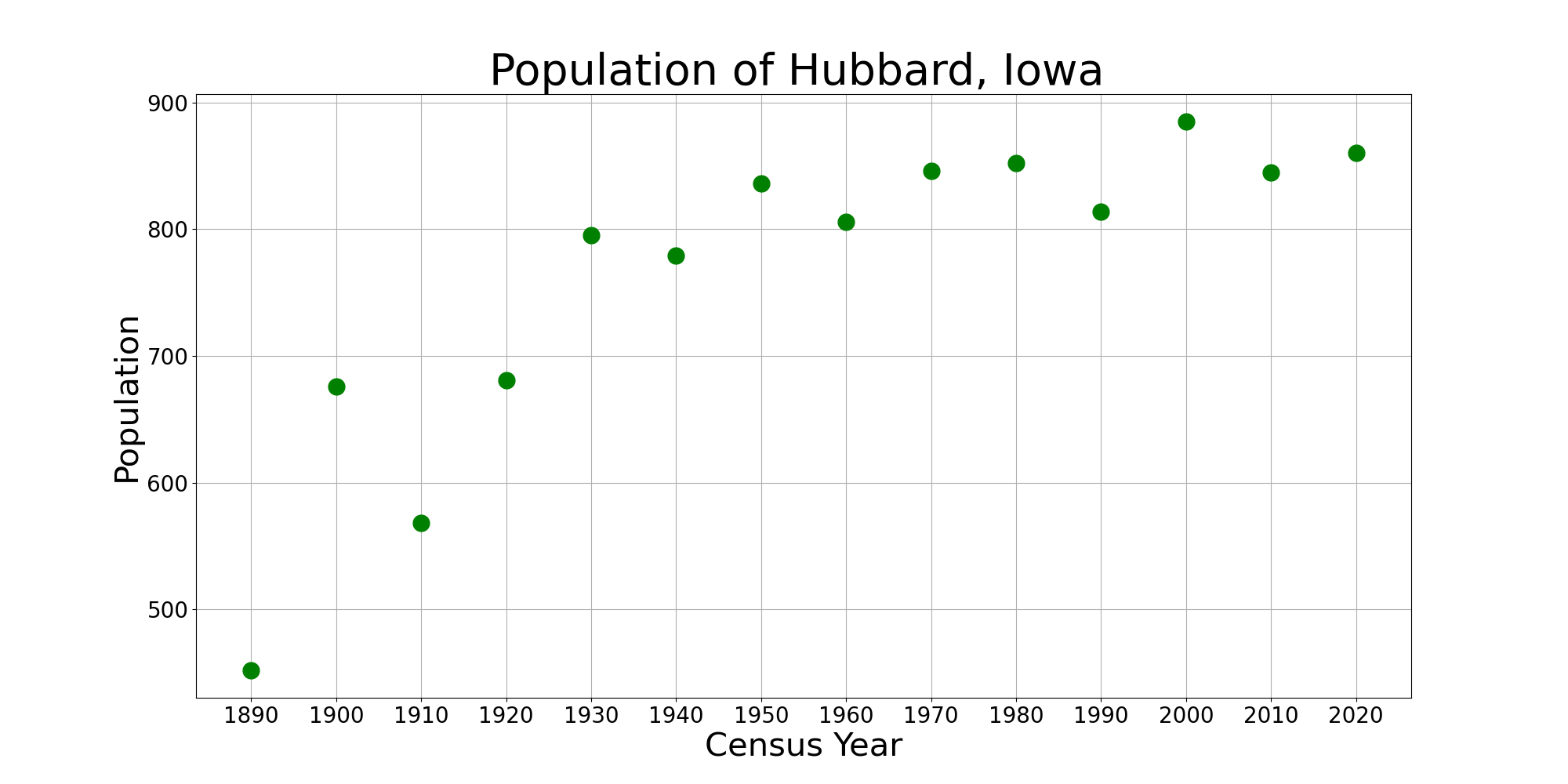
The population of Hubbard, Iowa from US census data

=== 2020 census ===
As of the census of 2020, there were 860 people, 356 households, and 220 families residing in the city. The population density was 465.6 inhabitants per square mile (179.8/km^{2}). There were 391 housing units at an average density of 211.7 per square mile (81.7/km^{2}). The racial makeup of the city was 94.8% White, 0.3% Black or African American, 0.2% Native American, 0.1% Asian, 0.0% Pacific Islander, 1.5% from other races and 3.0% from two or more races. Hispanic or Latino persons of any race comprised 3.1% of the population.

Of the 356 households, 26.4% of which had children under the age of 18 living with them, 51.7% were married couples living together, 5.1% were cohabitating couples, 24.2% had a female householder with no spouse or partner present and 19.1% had a male householder with no spouse or partner present. 38.2% of all households were non-families. 35.7% of all households were made up of individuals, 16.9% had someone living alone who was 65 years old or older.

The median age in the city was 48.2 years. 23.7% of the residents were under the age of 20; 4.9% were between the ages of 20 and 24; 18.4% were from 25 and 44; 27.0% were from 45 and 64; and 26.0% were 65 years of age or older. The gender makeup of the city was 48.6% male and 51.4% female.

=== 2010 census ===
At the 2010 census there were 845 people, 356 households and 219 families living in the city. The population density was 459.2 per square mile (177.3/km^{2}). There were 396 housing units at an average density of 215.2 per square mile (83.1/km^{2}). The racial make-up was 97.6% White, 0.1% African American, 0.1% Native American, 0.4% Asian, 1.1% from other races and 0.7% from two or more races. Hispanic or Latino of any race were 2.8% of the population.

There were 356 households, of which 24.7% had children under the age of 18 living with them, 53.9% were married couples living together, 6.2% had a female householder with no husband present, 1.4% had a male householder with no wife present, and 38.5% were non-families. 32.9% of all households were made up of individuals, and 16.3% had someone living alone who was 65 years of age or older. The average household size was 2.21 and the average family size was 2.80.

The median age was 47.8 years. 21.7% of residents were under the age of 18; 5.1% were between the ages of 18 and 24; 19.6% were from 25 to 44; 25.7% were from 45 to 64; and 27.8% were 65 years of age or older. The gender makeup of the city was 45.1% male and 54.9% female.

=== 2000 census ===
At the 2000 census, there were 885 people, 374 households and 253 families living in the city. The population density was 481.7 per square mile (186.0/km^{2}). There were 409 housing units at an average density of 222.6 per square mile (85.9/km^{2}). The racial make-up was 99.32% White, 0.11% Asian, 0.34% from other races and 0.23% from two or more races. Hispanic or Latino of any race were 0.45% of the population.

There were 374 households, of which 25.7% had children under the age of 18 living with them, 60.2% were married couples living together, 4.8% had a female householder with no husband present and 32.1% were non-families. 29.7% of all households were made up of individuals, and 20.6% had someone living alone who was 65 years of age or older. The average household size was 2.24 and the average family size was 2.76.

20.7% were under the age of 18, 5.9% from 18 to 24, 22.6% from 25 to 44, 16.8% from 45 to 64, and 34.0% were 65 years of age or older. The median age was 46 years. For every 100 females, there were 86.7 males. For every 100 females age 18 and over, there were 83.3 males.

The median household income was $35,089 and the median family income was $41,563. Males had a median income of $31,157 and females $22,417. The per capita income was $21,805. About 1.9% of families and 4.8% of the population were below the poverty line, including 6.2% of those under age 18 and 4.5% of those age 65 or over.

== Education ==
Hubbard–Radcliffe Community School District is the area school district. The district was formed on July 1, 1993, with the merger of the Hubbard and Radcliffe school districts. In 2019, it had a grade-sharing arrangement with Eldora–New Providence Community School District and operates as "South Hardin Schools".

Kindergarten to fifth grade students from Hubbard attend Hubbard–Radcliffe Elementary School in Radcliffe, while sixth to eighth grades attend South Hardin Middle School in Hubbard. Ninth to twelve grades attend South Hardin High School in Eldora, the county seat of Hardin County.
