= Cottage, Iowa =

- former unincorporated community
- Location within Iowa
- Coordinates: 42°24′16″N 93°18′37″W
- Country: United States
- State: Iowa
- County: Hardin
- Elevation: 1,112 ft (339 m)
- Time zone: UTC-6 (Central (CST))
  - Summer (DST): UTC-5 (CDT)
- GNIS feature ID: 466249

Cottage was an unincorporated community in Hardin County, in the U.S. state of Iowa.

== Geography ==
Cottage was located at 42°24′16″N 93°18′37″W, on what is now J Avenue.

== History ==
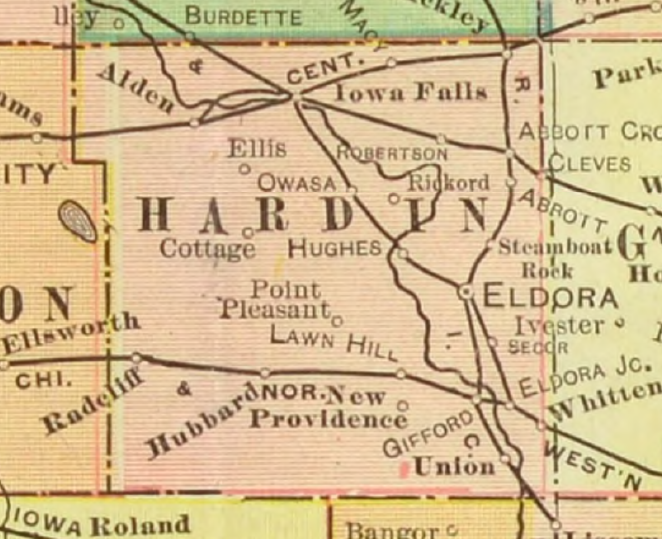
Cottage in central Hardin County, Iowa, in 1902

A post office named Cottage was established in Ellis Township in Section 29 in 1860; this was later moved to Section 32.

In 1870, the Cottage townsite was platted on the corners of Sections 28, 29, 32, and 33 of Ellis Township. Historian William J Moir noted that the community conducted good business for several years following its founding.

Andrew Bronson established a store in Cottage in 1870. W. A. Caraway established a cheese factory and a general store in Cottage in 1881–1882. A. P. Jensen established a blacksmith shop in 1874. Cottage Community Church and a school also operated in the community.

The Cottage Cemetery Association was founded in 1873. Soon thereafter, a cemetery was formed north of the townsite.

Cottage's population was 52 in 1902, but over the years, the community dissolved. The townfolk hoped for a railroad, but the Des Moines and St. Paul Railroad bypassed Cottage in favor of nearby Buckeye. By 1911, the community was mostly abandoned. However, Cottage still maintained its school at that time. The Cottage school had one teacher.

Cottage Cemetery, on county road J Avenue, still marks the site of the community.

Gehrke Wildlife Area, just north of the cemetery on J Avenue, is a 6.5-acre (0.026 km^{2}; 2.6 ha) wilderness area on the South Fork of the Iowa River. Fishing and hunting are allowed.

== See also ==
- Macy, Iowa
