= Cleves, Iowa =

Unincorporated community in Iowa, US

- unincorporated community
- Location within the state of Iowa
- Coordinates: 42°28′22″N 93°02′43″W
- Country: USA
- State: Iowa
- County: Hardin County
- Elevation: 328 m (1,076 ft)
- Time zone: UTC-6 (Central (CST))
  - Summer (DST): UTC-5 (CDT)
- GNIS feature ID: 455476

Cleves is an unincorporated community in Hardin County, Iowa, United States, with a bank, a repair shop, and a grain elevator.

== Geography ==
Cleves is in the far eastern part of Hardin County.

== History ==
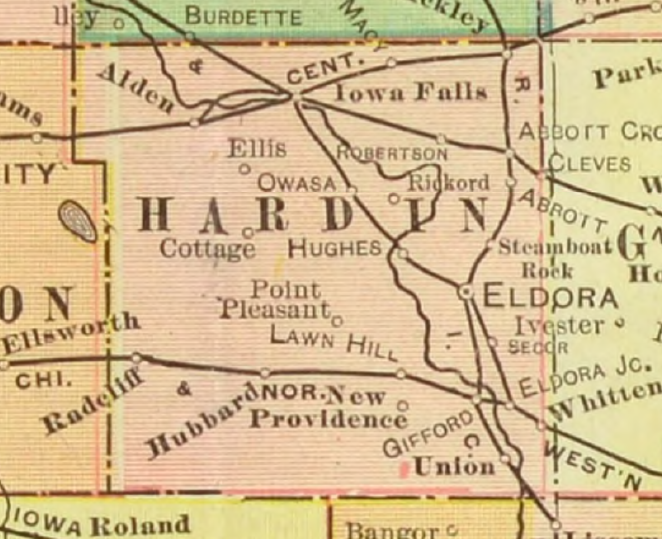
Cleves in the far eastern part of Hardin County, Iowa, in 1902

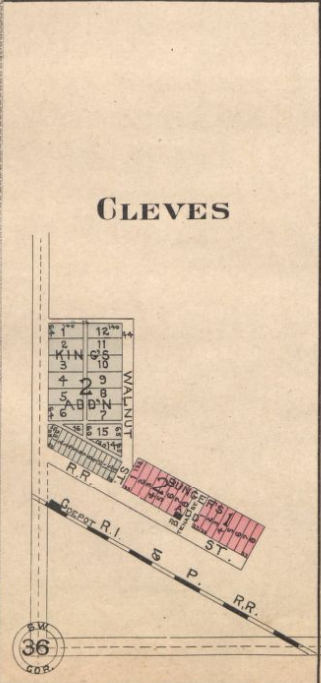
Plat map of Cleves, Iowa, in 1903

Cleves was platted in Section 36 about a mile southeast of Abbott, Iowa, in 1880 by the Rock Island Railroad, which was building a track through this part of Hardin County. N. Bonjer made an addition to the community in 1881. The Cleves town plat ran diagonally due to the rail line running diagonally through the community.

The Cleves post office was established in 1881. A grain dealer, lumber and stockyard, blacksmith, farm implement, and general store were also established during this era. The Martin Brothers opened the first store at this point in 1881. In 1880, Lusch, Carton & Company built a grain elevator. Around 1911, Cleves had a population of about 100.

Cleves' population was 25 in 1900, and 75 in 1925.

In 1940, the population of Cleves was 50.

== See also ==
- Lawn Hill, Iowa
