= Pine Lake State Park =

State park in Iowa, United States

- Location within Iowa Location within the United States
- Location: Hardin County, Iowa, United States
- Coordinates: 42°22′40″N 93°03′47″W
- Area: 654 acres (265 ha)
- Elevation: 991 ft (302 m)
- Administrator: Iowa Department of Natural Resources
- Website: Official website

Pine Lake State Park is a state park located northeast of Eldora in Hardin County, Iowa, United States. The park encompass two lakes: 50-acre (20 ha) Lower Pine Lake and 69-acre (28 ha) Upper Pine Lake. Pine lake is celebrating its 100th anniversary in 2026. It was the first state park in Iowa. The variety of White pines located in the area came to Iowa from glacial drift in Wisconsin.

== Camping ==
The Pine Lake campground has 124 camping units with electrical hook-ups, modern showers, restroom facilities and a trailer dump station. Half of the campsites are available on a first-come, first-served basis, while the remainder must be reserved.

== Cabins ==
The park contains four stone and timber cabins that were built by the Civilian Conservation Corps and the Works Progress Administration in the 1930s.

== Trails ==
There are more than 10 miles (16 km) of developed trails around the lake. Trails are marked with points of interest that correspond with trail brochures available at trail heads, the campground and the park office.

There is also a 50-mile (80 km) Lake-to-Lake State Park Bike Route connecting Pine Lake and George Wyth Memorial State Parks.

== Lake ==
Both lakes are stocked with bass, crappie, northerns, and catfish. The Iowa River borders a portion of the park and is noted for its channel catfish and smallmouth bass. A beach is located on the lower lake and boat ramps on both lakes.
