= Owasa, Iowa =

- City
- Location of Owasa, Iowa
- Coordinates: 42°25′55″N 93°12′17″W
- Country: USA
- State: Iowa
- County: Hardin

Area
  - Total: 0.56 sq mi (1.46 km^{2})
  - Land: 0.56 sq mi (1.46 km^{2})
  - Water: 0 sq mi (0.00 km^{2})
- Elevation: 1,106 ft (337 m)

Population (2020)
  - Total: 34
  - Density: 60.4/sq mi (23.32/km^{2})
- Time zone: UTC-6 (Central (CST))
  - Summer (DST): UTC-5 (CDT)
- ZIP code: 50126
- Area code: 641
- FIPS code: 19-60555
- GNIS feature ID: 2396113
- Website: http://www.owasaiowa.com

Owasa is a city in Hardin County, Iowa, United States. The population was 34 at the time of the 2020 census.

== History ==
Owasa was platted in 1883 or 1884. The name is derived from the Fox language, meaning "bear".

== Geography ==
According to the United States Census Bureau, the city has a total area of 0.56 square miles (1.45 km^{2}), all land.

== Demographics ==
Historical populations
Year	Pop.	±%
1930	83	—
1940	117	+41.0%
1950	100	−14.5%
1960	104	+4.0%
1970	69	−33.7%
1980	65	−5.8%
1990	37	−43.1%
2000	38	+2.7%
2010	43	+13.2%
2020	34	−20.9%
Source:"U.S. Census website". United States Census Bureau. and Iowa Data Center; Source: U.S. Decennial Census

=== 2020 census ===
As of the census of 2020, there were 34 people, 18 households, and 12 families residing in the city. The population density was 60.4 inhabitants per square mile (23.3/km^{2}). There were 18 housing units at an average density of 32.0 per square mile (12.3/km^{2}). The racial makeup of the city was 88.2% White, 0.0% Black or African American, 0.0% Native American, 0.0% Asian, 0.0% Pacific Islander, 0.0% from other races and 11.8% from two or more races. Hispanic or Latino persons of any race comprised 5.9% of the population.

Of the 18 households, 38.9% of which had children under the age of 18 living with them, 50.0% were married couples living together, 11.1% were cohabitating couples, 22.2% had a female householder with no spouse or partner present and 16.7% had a male householder with no spouse or partner present. 33.3% of all households were non-families. 27.8% of all households were made up of individuals, 22.2% had someone living alone who was 65 years old or older.

The median age in the city was 47.0 years. 23.5% of the residents were under the age of 20; 2.9% were between the ages of 20 and 24; 17.6% were from 25 and 44; 29.4% were from 45 and 64; and 26.5% were 65 years of age or older. The gender makeup of the city was 50.0% male and 50.0% female.

=== 2010 census ===
As of the census of 2010, there were 43 people, 17 households, and 9 families living in the city. The population density was 76.8 inhabitants per square mile (29.7/km^{2}). There were 19 housing units at an average density of 33.9 per square mile (13.1/km^{2}). The racial makeup of the city was 90.7% White and 9.3% from two or more races.

There were 17 households, of which 41.2% had children under the age of 18 living with them, 35.3% were married couples living together, 5.9% had a female householder with no husband present, 11.8% had a male householder with no wife present, and 47.1% were non-families. 29.4% of all households were made up of individuals, and 5.9% had someone living alone who was 65 years of age or older. The average household size was 2.53 and the average family size was 3.44.

The median age in the city was 35.3 years. 32.6% of residents were under the age of 18; 7% were between the ages of 18 and 24; 27.9% were from 25 to 44; 25.6% were from 45 to 64; and 7% were 65 years of age or older. The gender makeup of the city was 44.2% male and 55.8% female.

=== 2000 census ===
As of the census of 2000, there were 38 people, 17 households, and 8 families living in the city. The population density was 67.3 inhabitants per square mile (26.0/km^{2}). There were 19 housing units at an average density of 33.7 per square mile (13.0/km^{2}). The racial makeup of the city was 100.00% White.

There were 17 households, out of which 35.3% had children under the age of 18 living with them, 47.1% were married couples living together, and 47.1% were non-families. 35.3% of all households were made up of individuals, and 23.5% had someone living alone who was 65 years of age or older. The average household size was 2.24 and the average family size was 2.89.

In the city, the population was spread out, with 21.1% under the age of 18, 10.5% from 18 to 24, 31.6% from 25 to 44, 23.7% from 45 to 64, and 13.2% who were 65 years of age or older. The median age was 32 years. For every 100 females, there were 137.5 males. For every 100 females age 18 and over, there were 114.3 males.

The median income for a household in the city was $35,417, and the median income for a family was $75,938. Males had a median income of $26,250 versus $22,500 for females. The per capita income for the city was $17,047. There were no families and 6.5% of the population living below the poverty line, including no under eighteens and 40.0% of those over 64.

== Education ==
Owasa lies within the Eldora–New Providence Community School District, which formed on July 1, 1980, with the merger of the Eldora and New Providence school districts. As of 2019, it has a grade-sharing arrangement with Hubbard–Radcliffe Community School District and operates as "South Hardin Schools".
