= Eldora Herald-Ledger =

Weekly newspaper published in Eldora, Iowa

- Type: Weekly newspaper
- Owner: Mid-America Publishing
- Founded: 1866 ( as The Eldora Ledger)
- Ceased publication: 2026
- Language: English
- Website: eldoranewspapers.com

The Eldora Herald-Ledger was a weekly newspaper published in Eldora, Iowa. It was the main newspaper for Hardin County, Iowa. The paper originated in 1866 as The Eldora Ledger. A rival paper called The Eldora Herald was founded in 1873, and the two papers merged in 1931.

== The Eldora Ledger (1866-1911) ==
The Eldora Ledger was founded in 1866 by Robert "Bob" McBride. The paper was established shortly after Eldora lost its prior paper, the Hardin County Sentinel, to the city of Iowa Falls, Iowa; as the publisher of the Sentinel, M. C. Woodruff, had lost faith in the future prospects of Eldora due to its then lack of railroad transportation. The paper was first published on January 6, 1866. Bob Mcbride continued as the first managing-editor of the paper until the spring of 1882 when he was succeeded by his brother, John C. McBride, and John's business partner, W. S. Preston. Under their leadership, the size and quality of the paper greatly improved.

In c. 1888, McBride and Preston sold The Eldora Ledger to the Methodist minister and politician John Dolph; a man who served as Hardin County's representative in the Iowa General Assembly while operating the paper. By 1892 Dolph had sold the paper to J. D. Haworth & Sons. They sold the paper to W.A.K. Campbell in 1893, who in turn sold the paper to Charles and William H. Sheakley in 1894. In 1903 Paul C. Woods purchased The Eldora Ledger.

== Hardin County Ledger (1912-1931) ==
In 1911, H.S. Kneedler purchased The Eldora Ledger from Woods. Soon after, Kneedler renamed the paper the Hardin County Ledger; and it was first published under that name on January 25, 1912. The paper continued to publish under that name until 1931 when the paper merged with The Eldora Herald to form The Eldora Herald-Ledger.

== Eldora Herald-Ledger (1931-present) ==
In 2014, Mid-America Publishing Corporation purchased the Hardin County Index and Eldora Herald-Ledger from John Butters and the Washington Advertising Company. In 2026, the company announced it would close and all publications it owned would cease. While many papers were sold and rescued from closure, the Herald-Leger shuttered.
