= Ulysses Grant Whitney =

American politician and lawyer (1864–1938)

Ulysses Grant Whitney (July 10, 1864 – March 6, 1938) was an American politician and lawyer.

Ulysses Whitney was the youngest son of George Whitney and Maria Row, born on July 10, 1864, in Union, Iowa. George Whitney was a native of Herkimer County, New York. Through his mother, Ulysses Whitney was of German descent. Both of Whitney's parents lived in New York before relocating to Iowa in 1856. Maria Whitney died on May 7, 1904, and George Whitney died on July 11, 1912.

After completing his education in a country school, Ulysses Whitney began a five-year teaching career, and served as principal of the high school in Union during his last year as an educator. Whitney then enrolled at Cornell College for the next two years and studied law with Charles Ezra Albrook. In 1890, Whitney graduated from the Drake University Law School.

Whitney represented Hardin County at the Iowa Republican State Convention of 1890, and choose to remain in Sioux City after the convention ended. He served as justice of the peace for two terms, and became Woodbury County attorney on January 1, 1901. Whitney remained Woodbury County attorney until his election to the Iowa House of Representatives in 1910. He held the District 58 seat as a Republican for two terms, from January 9, 1911, to January 10, 1915. Whitney did not run for a third term as state representative, instead accepting an appointment as court reporter for the Iowa Supreme Court. From 1919, he concurrently served on a commission convened to compile and revise the Code of Iowa, and was recognized by the Iowa General Assembly with the title of code editor. In this position, Whitney oversaw the 1924, 1927, 1931, and 1935 publications of the Code of Iowa.

Whitney died at his home in Sioux City on March 6, 1938.
