= Whitten, Iowa =

- City
- Location of Whitten, Iowa
- Coordinates: 42°15′45″N 93°00′33″W
- Country: USA
- State: Iowa
- County: Hardin

Area
  - Total: 0.50 sq mi (1.29 km^{2})
  - Land: 0.50 sq mi (1.29 km^{2})
  - Water: 0.0039 sq mi (0.01 km^{2})
- Elevation: 1,034 ft (315 m)

Population (2020)
  - Total: 100
  - Density: 201.2/sq mi (77.69/km^{2})
- Time zone: UTC-6 (Central (CST))
  - Summer (DST): UTC-5 (CDT)
- ZIP code: 50269
- Area code: 641
- FIPS code: 19-85305
- GNIS feature ID: 2397308

Whitten is a city in Hardin County, Iowa, United States. The population was 100 at the time of the 2020 census.

== History ==
C.C. Whitten, an official for the Northwestern Railway System, platted the town in 1880. Whitten was incorporated in 1882 with a population of 350. By 1914, Whitten was proud of its church membership of 170, its schools, three general stores, a blacksmith shop, restaurant, bank, produce house, implement store, and two doctors. In fact, Whitten was never without a doctor until 1973 when Dr. George Blaha died after serving the community for 60 years.

In the early 20th century, the city experienced several devastating fires which destroyed much of the town. The city rebuilt very little.

The Whitten Renagades semi-pro baseball team, managed by James Speas, played for over 2 decades with their final season in 1996.

== Geography ==
According to the United States Census Bureau, the city has a total area of 0.54 square miles (1.40 km^{2}), all land.

== Demographics ==
Historical populations
Year	Pop.	±%
1890	195	—
1900	217	+11.3%
1910	219	+0.9%
1920	225	+2.7%
1930	199	−11.6%
1940	227	+14.1%
1950	174	−23.3%
1960	184	+5.7%
1970	194	+5.4%
1980	168	−13.4%
1990	137	−18.5%
2000	160	+16.8%
2010	149	−6.9%
2020	100	−32.9%
Source:"U.S. Census website". United States Census Bureau. and Iowa Data Center; Source: U.S. Decennial Census

=== 2020 census ===
As of the census of 2020, there were 100 people, 42 households, and 31 families residing in the city. The population density was 201.2 inhabitants per square mile (77.7/km^{2}). There were 57 housing units at an average density of 114.7 per square mile (44.3/km^{2}). The racial makeup of the city was 94.0% White, 0.0% Black or African American, 0.0% Native American, 1.0% Asian, 0.0% Pacific Islander, 2.0% from other races and 3.0% from two or more races. Hispanic or Latino persons of any race comprised 4.0% of the population.

Of the 42 households, 21.4% of which had children under the age of 18 living with them, 47.6% were married couples living together, 14.3% were cohabitating couples, 19.0% had a female householder with no spouse or partner present and 19.0% had a male householder with no spouse or partner present. 26.2% of all households were non-families. 23.8% of all households were made up of individuals, 2.4% had someone living alone who was 65 years old or older.

The median age in the city was 43.3 years. 26.0% of the residents were under the age of 20; 2.0% were between the ages of 20 and 24; 24.0% were from 25 and 44; 34.0% were from 45 and 64; and 14.0% were 65 years of age or older. The gender makeup of the city was 54.0% male and 46.0% female.

=== 2010 census ===
As of the census of 2010, there were 149 people, 60 households, and 42 families residing in the city. The population density was 275.9 inhabitants per square mile (106.5/km^{2}). There were 66 housing units at an average density of 122.2 per square mile (47.2/km^{2}). The racial makeup of the city was 95.3% White, 1.3% African American, and 3.4% from other races. Hispanic or Latino of any race were 3.4% of the population.

There were 60 households, of which 35.0% had children under the age of 18 living with them, 53.3% were married couples living together, 8.3% had a female householder with no husband present, 8.3% had a male householder with no wife present, and 30.0% were non-families. 25.0% of all households were made up of individuals, and 13.3% had someone living alone who was 65 years of age or older. The average household size was 2.48 and the average family size was 2.98.

The median age in the city was 37.3 years. 28.2% of residents were under the age of 18; 11.4% were between the ages of 18 and 24; 18.1% were from 25 to 44; 32.3% were from 45 to 64; and 10.1% were 65 years of age or older. The gender makeup of the city was 49.0% male and 51.0% female.

=== 2000 census ===
As of the census of 2000, there were 160 people, 56 households, and 43 families residing in the city. The population density was 293.6 inhabitants per square mile (113.4/km^{2}). There were 63 housing units at an average density of 115.6 per square mile (44.6/km^{2}). The racial makeup of the city was 97.50% White, 1.25% Asian, and 1.25% from two or more races.

There were 56 households, out of which 42.9% had children under the age of 18 living with them, 64.3% were married couples living together, 5.4% had a female householder with no husband present, and 23.2% were non-families. 19.6% of all households were made up of individuals, and 8.9% had someone living alone who was 65 years of age or older. The average household size was 2.86 and the average family size was 3.33.

In the city, the population was spread out, with 33.8% under the age of 18, 6.9% from 18 to 24, 26.9% from 25 to 44, 20.0% from 45 to 64, and 12.5% who were 65 years of age or older. The median age was 36 years. For every 100 females, there were 97.5 males. For every 100 females age 18 and over, there were 107.8 males.

The median income for a household in the city was $42,656, and the median income for a family was $44,219. Males had a median income of $31,458 versus $21,250 for females. The per capita income for the city was $13,996. None of the families and 1.3% of the population were living below the poverty line, including no under eighteens and 13.3% of those over 64.

== Education ==
BCLUW Community School District operates public schools serving Whitten. The schools are BCLUW Elementary School in Conrad, BCLUW Middle School in Union, and BCLUW High School in Conrad.

The Union-Whitten school district served Whitten until July 1, 1992, when it merged into BCLUW.

== Notable people ==
- Ray Boynton (1883 – 1951), Artist
- Denise Long Rife (1951 - ), Sportswoman
