= Tipton Township =

Tipton Township may refer to the following townships in the United States:

- Tipton Township, Cass County, Indiana
- Tipton Township, Hardin County, Iowa
