= Alden Township, Hardin County, Iowa =

Township in Iowa, USA

Alden Township
- Township
- Alden Township within the United States Alden Township (Iowa)
- Coordinates: 42.5°N 93.4°W
- Country: United States
- State: Iowa
- County: Hardin County
- Elevation: 357 m (1,171 ft)
- Time zone: UTC-06:00 (Central (CST))
  - Summer (DST): UTC-05:00 (Central (CST))

Alden Township is a township in Hardin County, Iowa, United States.

== History ==
Alden Township was organized in 1856. It was named for Henry Alden, a pioneer settler.
