= Abbott, Iowa =

- unincorporated community
- Location within Iowa
- Coordinates: 42°29′07″N 93°03′59″W
- Country: United States
- State: Iowa
- County: Hardin
- Elevation: 1,099 ft (335 m)
- Time zone: UTC-6 (Central (CST))
  - Summer (DST): UTC-5 (CDT)
- GNIS feature ID: 464137

Abbott is an unincorporated community in Hardin County, in the U.S. state of Iowa. It is at the junction of 150th Street and V Avenue.

== History ==
Abbott was platted near the junction of the Burlington, Cedar Rapids and Northern Railway and the Iowa Central Railway, in Sections 34 and 35 of Aetna Township (now Etna Township). The depot was located nearly a half a mile north of Abbott.

Abbott's population was 53 in 1902, and 106 in 1925. The population was 34 in 1940.
