= Thomas DeBaggio =

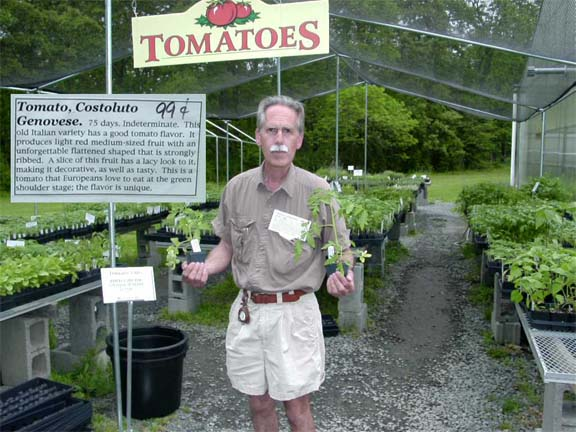
- Born: January 5, 1942; Eldora, Iowa
- Died: February 21, 2011(age 69); Annandale, Virginia
- Occupation: Author

Thomas Davis DeBaggio (January 5, 1942, Eldora, Iowa – February 21, 2011, Annandale, Virginia) was an American author, herb grower, and advocate for research into Alzheimer's disease.

DeBaggio was once called the best "Rosemaryologist in America" and his company, DeBaggio Herbs, was one of the most respected herb farms and nurseries in the Washington, D.C., area. His book Growing Herbs from Seed, Cutting, and Root was the 1995 recipient of the Benjamin Franklin Award for best garden book of 1995 for excellence in editorial content and design. He co-authored The Big Book of Herbs with Arthur O. Tucker; both authors received the Gertrude B. Foster Award for Excellence in Herbal Literature from the Herb Society of America. In 2000 he received a Herb Society of America Certificate of Appreciation. With Susan Beisinger he co-authored Basil: A Herb Lover's Guide. His work has been featured in the magazine The Herb Companion.

DeBaggio grew up and lived near Ashton Heights, Arlington, Virginia, for much of his life. Prior to growing herbs in 1974, he was a journalist with the Wilmington Independent and the Northern Virginia Sun.

== Alzheimer's ==
In 1999, aged 57, he was diagnosed with early onset Alzheimer's. He wrote two books about the illness: Losing My Mind and When It Gets Dark: An Enlightened Reflection on Life with Alzheimer's. From 2000 to 2010 his wife, Joyce DeBaggio, son, Francesco DeBaggio, and he were interviewed several times on National Public Radio. By creating a public record of, and insights into, his decline; he wanted people to better understand Alzheimer's and to encourage research and treatment of the illness. On June 24, 2002, his wife and he appeared on The Oprah Winfrey Show to discuss their battle with the illness. In 2011 at its annual convention, the International Herb Association named its annual book award the Thomas DeBaggio Award. His book Losing My Mind received the honor of being the first book awarded the Thomas DeBaggio Award.
