= Macy, Iowa =

- former unincorporated community
- Location within Iowa
- Coordinates: 42°32′22″N 93°08′53″W
- Country: United States
- State: Iowa
- County: Hardin
- Elevation: 823 ft (251 m)
- Time zone: UTC-6 (Central (CST))
  - Summer (DST): UTC-5 (CDT)
- GNIS feature ID: 1997498

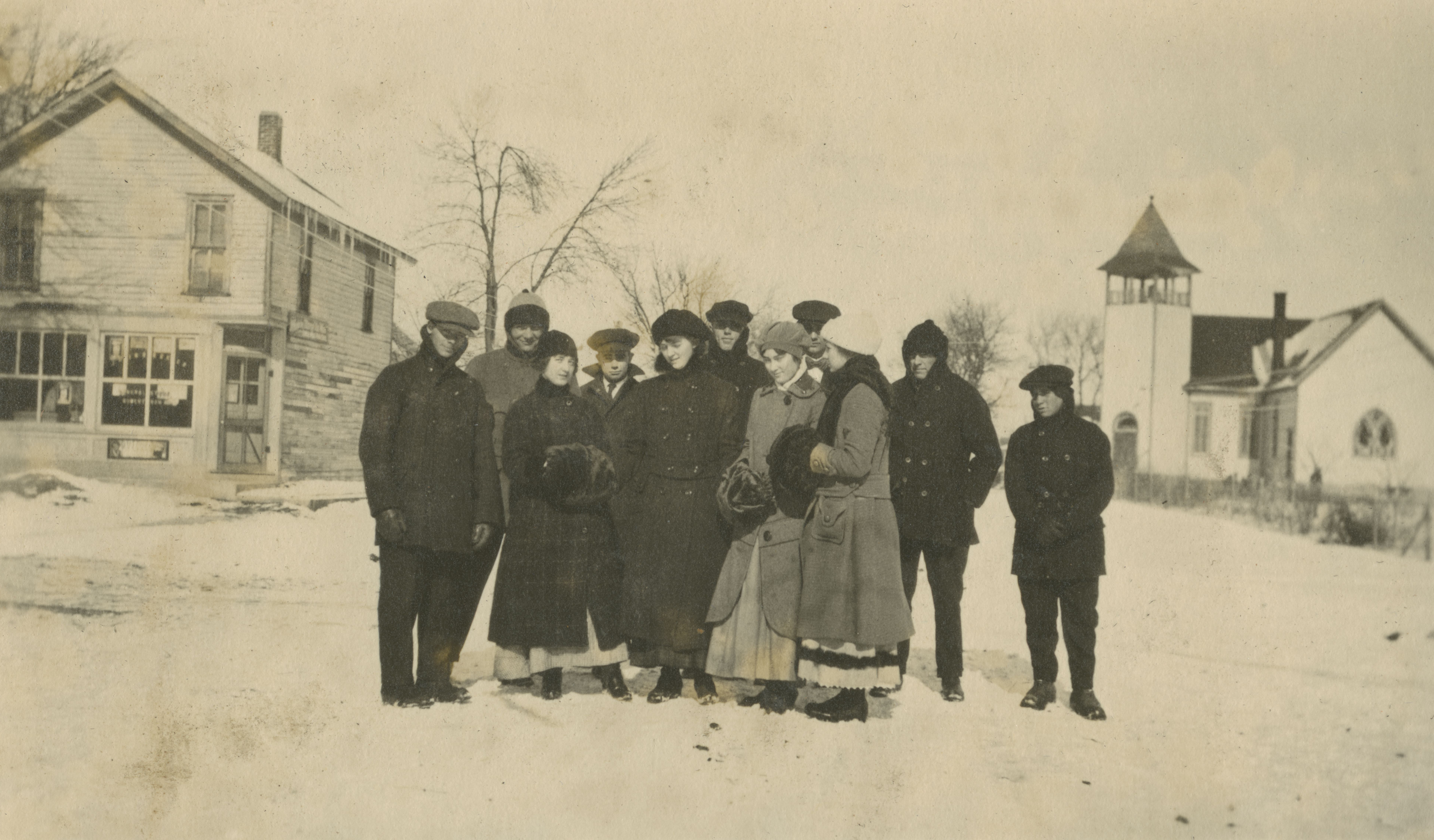
Residents in downtown Macy in 1920.

Macy is a former unincorporated community in northern Hardin County, in the U.S. state of Iowa.

== Geography ==
Macy was located at 42°32′22″N 93°08′53″W, along the Illinois Central Railroad.

== History ==
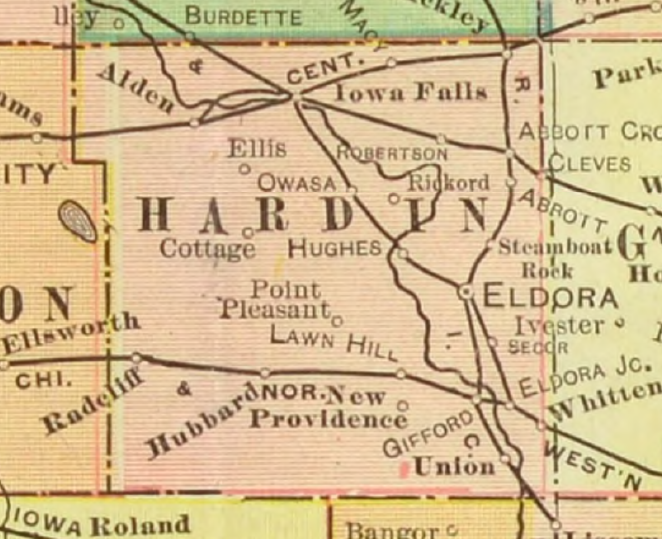
A map of Macy in northern Hardin County, Iowa in 1902

Macy's post office opened on August 5, 1893. The population of the community was just 12 in 1902.

The Macy post office was discontinued on February 14, 1914.

Macy's population was 25 in 1940.

The railroad tracks and associated buildings are still located in Macy.

== See also ==
- Secor, Iowa
