= Hardin Township, Hardin County, Iowa =

Township in Hardin County, Iowa, U.S.

Coordinates: 42.5122°N 93.2314°W

Hardin Township is a township in Hardin County, Iowa, United States.

== History ==
Hardin Township was organized in 1854.
