= Garden City, Iowa =

- Census-designated place
- Location within the state of Iowa Garden City (the United States)
- Coordinates: 42°14′54″N 93°23′43″W
- Country: United States
- State: Iowa
- County: Hardin

Area
  - Total: 1.00 sq mi (2.58 km^{2})
  - Land: 1.00 sq mi (2.58 km^{2})
  - Water: 0 sq mi (0.00 km^{2})
- Elevation: 1,201 ft (366 m)

Population (2020)
  - Total: 100
  - Density: 100.3/sq mi (38.71/km^{2})
- Time zone: UTC-6 (Central (CST))
  - Summer (DST): UTC-5 (CDT)
- ZIP code: 50102
- Area code: 515
- GNIS feature ID: 2629965

Garden City is an unincorporated community and census-designated place (CDP) in Hardin County, Iowa, United States. As of the 2020 Census, the population was 100.

== Demographics ==
Historical population
| Census | Pop. | Note | %± |
|---|---|---|---|
| 2010 | 89 | | — |
| 2020 | 100 | | 12.4% |
U.S. Decennial Census

=== 2020 census ===
As of the census of 2020, there were 100 people, 46 households, and 35 families residing in the community. The population density was 100.3 inhabitants per square mile (38.7/km^{2}). There were 46 housing units at an average density of 46.1 per square mile (17.8/km^{2}). The racial makeup of the community was 95.0% White, 1.0% Black or African American, 0.0% Native American, 1.0% Asian, 0.0% Pacific Islander, 0.0% from other races and 3.0% from two or more races. Hispanic or Latino persons of any race comprised 3.0% of the population.

Of the 46 households, 4.3% of which had children under the age of 18 living with them, 76.1% were married couples living together, 8.7% were cohabitating couples, 15.2% had a female householder with no spouse or partner present and 0.0% had a male householder with no spouse or partner present. 23.9% of all households were non-families. 15.2% of all households were made up of individuals, 4.3% had someone living alone who was 65 years old or older.

The median age in the community was 57.0 years. 17.0% of the residents were under the age of 20; 4.0% were between the ages of 20 and 24; 17.0% were from 25 and 44; 22.0% were from 45 and 64; and 40.0% were 65 years of age or older. The gender makeup of the community was 59.0% male and 41.0% female.

== History ==
Garden City got its start in the year 1901, following construction of the railroad through that territory. The population was 85 in 1940.
