= Union Township, Hardin County, Iowa =

Township in Iowa, USA

Coordinates: 42.2497°N 93.0531°W

Union Township is a township in Hardin County, Iowa, United States.

== History ==
Union Township was created in 1853.
