= Jackson Township, Hardin County, Iowa =

Township in Hardin County, Iowa, U.S.

Coordinates: 42.4275°N 93.1750°W

Jackson Township is a township in Hardin County, Iowa, United States.

== History ==
Jackson Township was organized in 1853.
