= Clay Township, Hardin County, Iowa =

Township in Hardin County, Iowa, U.S.

Coordinates: 42.4347°N 93.0619°W

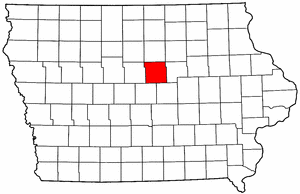
Hardin County, Iowa

Clay Township is a township in Hardin County, Iowa, United States.

== History ==
Clay Township was organized in 1855.
