= Homer D. Calkins =

American environmentalist

- Born: August 30, 1911 Ft. Morgan, Colorado
- Died: March 19, 1996 (aged 84) Iowa Falls, Iowa, Hardin County, Iowa
- Occupations: Environmentalist, broadcaster, columnist
- Spouse: Ruth Calkins
- Website: Calkins Nature Area

Homer D. Calkins (August 30, 1911 – March 19, 1996) was an American environmentalist who became a leading voice in the effort to save native habitat in Hardin County. He worked to develop county parks that met needs from plug-in campers to untouched wilderness areas. He was instrumental in delaying construction of a rerouted U.S. Highway 20 through the Iowa River Greenbelt in Hardin County, Iowa. Calkins received posthumous awards from the Iowa Wildlife Federation and the Iowa Wildlife Rehabilitators Association praising his long relationship to nature.

== Marriage ==
On March 24, 1940, Calkins married Ruth Winifred Robinson at the Little Brown Church ("The Church in the Wildwood"), Nashua, Iowa.

== Hardin County Conservation Board ==
On October 5, 1960, Homer Calkins was hired as the first executive director of the Hardin County Conservation Board. He remained as the executive director of the Board for 18 years, and rehabilitated injured animals most of his life.

== Media Work ==
While executive director of the Hardin County Conservation Board, Calkins had a long-running radio show on radio station KIFG-AM. In a folksy style similar to Aldo Leopold's A Sand County Almanac, Calkins would speak about natural scenes observed locally. Calkins also wrote weekly newspaper columns for the Iowa Falls Times-Citizen, the Ackley World Journal, and the Eldora Herald-Ledger.

== Donation ==
Homer Calkins and his wife Ruth donated their 76-acre (310,000 m^{2}) farm to the Ellsworth Community College Board of Trustees in 1981. Bordering the Iowa River in north central Iowa, the nature center includes woodland, wetland, and reconstructed native prairie. In the late 1990s, students in Landscape Architecture from Iowa State University worked under Professor William Grundman on site and development plans for the Calkins Nature Area.
