= Denise Long Rife =

American basketball player (born 1951)

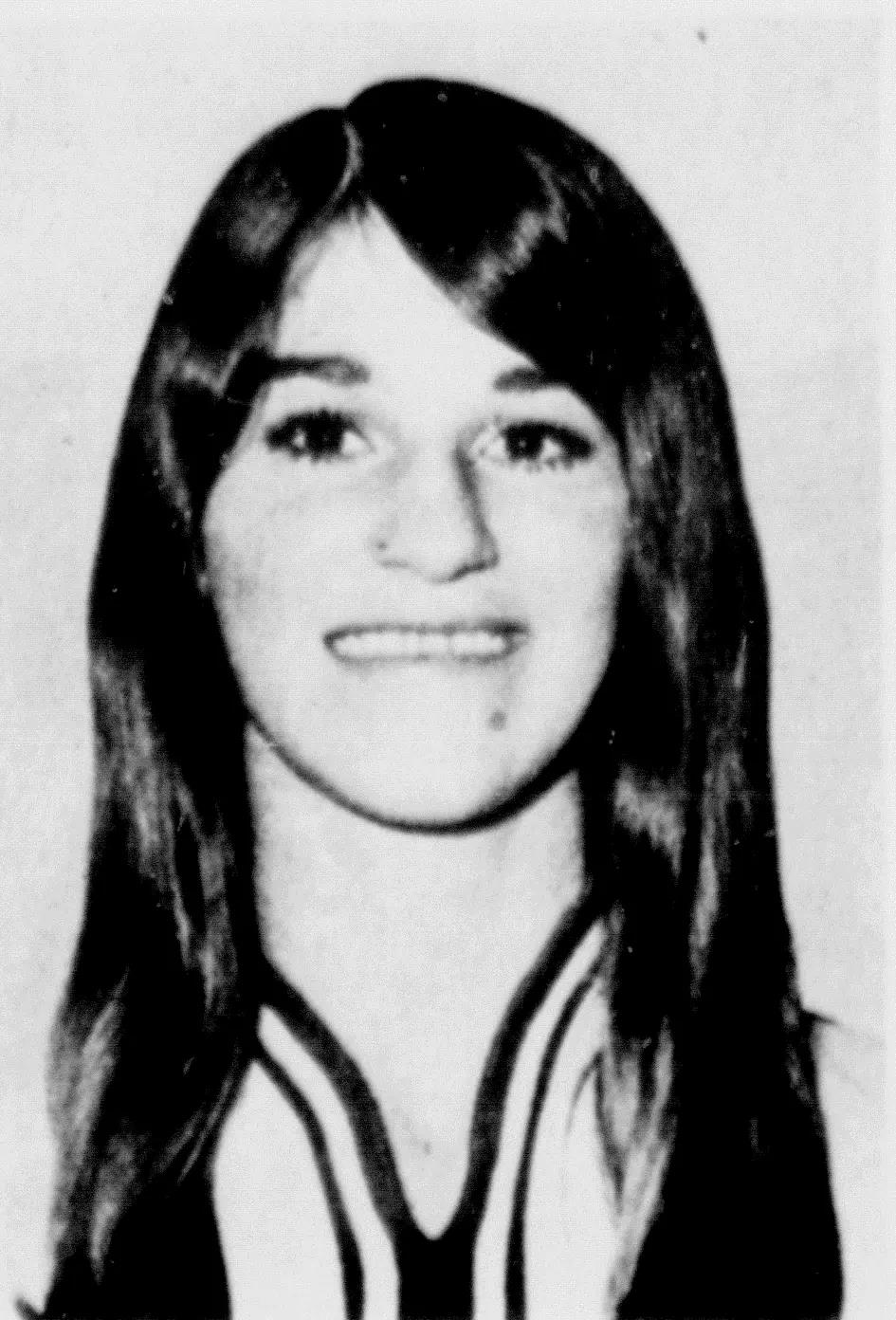

Personal information
- Born: 1951 (age 74–75) Whitten, Iowa, U.S.
- Listed height: 5 ft 11 in (1.80 m)

Career information
- High school: Union-Whitten (Union, Iowa)
- Position: Power forward / small forward
- Stats at Basketball Reference

Denise Long Rife (born Denise Long; 1951) is an American former basketball player. She was the first woman drafted by an NBA team when San Francisco Warriors owner Franklin Mieuli picked her in the 13th round in the 1969 NBA draft but the selection was voided.

== Early life ==
Rife was born in Whitten, Iowa, a town of fewer than 200 inhabitants, where her mother was the postmaster. She attended Union-Whitten High School, where she played basketball and led her team to a state championship win in 1968. She scored over a hundred points in a single game three times, and in her senior year, she averaged over 69 points per game. The six-on-six format of the time allowed Rife to score 6,250 points, breaking the national score record.

== Basketball career ==
=== NBA draft ===
Rife was the first woman drafted by a National Basketball Association (NBA) team, although NBA Commissioner Walter Kennedy vetoed the pick on grounds that, at the time, the league did not draft players straight from high school—nor women. When she was contacted, Long initially believed that she was being drafted by the military to fight in the Vietnam War. Long would also be the second person behind Elgin Baylor in 1956 to be considered an ineligible selection by the NBA (though in Baylor's case, he would later be considered a valid pick by the Lakers in 1958).

San Francisco Warriors owner Franklin Mieuli picked her in the 13th round of the 1969 NBA draft, but she played for a women's team—the "Warrior Girls Basketball League"—that the Warriors sponsored for one season rather than for the Warriors themselves.

=== Basketball career ===
According to the Warriors' YouTube channel, she was picked to be the league's star. She was 19 years old, 5'11" tall, and a graduate of Union-Whitten High School, where her class had only 34 students enrolled; the opportunity to go to San Francisco was irresistible. While there she met Wilt Chamberlain, who joked that she had broken his triple-digit shooting record. In 2018, the Warriors invited her and some of the other women from her league to a halftime ceremony honoring them during Women's History Month.

Rife played forward and was at her best shooting from the deep perimeter (before the 3-pointer became part of the game). At a time when "combined final game scores often finished well above 200 points", she repeatedly scored over 100 points in a single high school game. In one game, Rife recalled, a forward ended up guarding her because all of the guards on the opposition's team had fouled out trying to keep her from scoring. Her career record of 6,250 points lasted until Lynne Lorenzen bested her in the mid-1980s by nearly 500 points. She was inducted into the Iowa Girls Basketball Hall of Fame in 1975.

In pre-Title IX America, "girls' basketball in Iowa did not need a federal mandate to be more popular than boys’ basketball. ... The television audience for the girls’ championship game drew as many as 3.5 million viewers in nine Midwestern states," and championship game week was the biggest week of the economic year for Des Moines merchants. The 1968 championship game that her team won is available on YouTube. As Rife noted, for girls in small-town Iowa, basketball could be a lifesaver.

Her prowess led to attention from Sports Illustrated, which described her as "all swiftness and grace"; The Tonight Show, hosted at the time by fellow Iowan Johnny Carson; the Wall Street Journal, and other American media outlets. She was offered college scholarships but pre-Title IX women's college basketball was too limited to appeal to her.

In this era women's high school basketball generally had 6-member teams and was played as two half-court games rather than one full-court game. Three offensive players were defended by three opposing team players on each half of the court. Every player was restricted to their half of the court with the in-play ball transitioning back and forth across the half-court line.

During the summer of 1973, Rife played for the Venture Victory Team, "a Christian team where we went over and gave testimonies and sang Christian songs at half-time" during games against the Olympics teams from various Asian countries. This was full-court basketball, which she found challenging. In an interview with the Iowa PBS network, Rife discussed significant differences between the two versions of the game, explaining why women's basketball in her era was so exciting for audiences.

=== Post basketball career ===
After basketball, she studied at various colleges, including Marshalltown Community College and Faith Baptist Bible College, where she got degrees in physical education, in Bible theology, and eventually a degree in pharmacy from Drake University. She worked as a pharmacist until retiring in 2015. Long was honored by the Warriors in a halftime ceremony in 2018 on the anniversary of her draft.

== Personal life ==
While enrolled at the University of Iowa, Long received unwanted advances and obscene phone calls due to her fame. Long married David Sturdy, a basketball fanatic whom she met in 1973. Four years later, they split up, with Long citing Sturdy's interest in basketball while Long was actively attempting to distance herself from the sport. In 1981, she married Lee Andre, who had no knowledge of Long's career in basketball before the marriage.

== See also ==
- List of basketball players who have scored 100 points in a single game
