= Secor, Iowa =

Secor, Iowa Xenia, Iowa or Delanti, Iowa
- ghost town
- Location within Iowa Location within the United States
- Coordinates: 42°18′40″N 93°04′51″W
- Country: United States
- State: Iowa
- County: Hardin
- Elevation: 968 ft (295 m)
- Time zone: UTC-6 (Central (CST))
  - Summer (DST): UTC-5 (CDT)
- Area code: 641
- GNIS feature ID: 465437

Secor, previously known as Xenia and Delanti, is a ghost town in Hardin County, Iowa, United States. The community was 3.5 miles (5.6 km) south-southeast of Eldora. In its early years, the community was the site of one of the few bridges across the Iowa River in Hardin County. By the mid-20th century, however, the community had lost its school, mill, post office, and businesses, and Secor was considered a ghost town.

A 1955 Hardin County newspaper article called it "a place with three different names."

== Geography ==
The community lies at 42°18′40″N 93°04′51″W, along the South Fork of the Iowa River.

== History ==
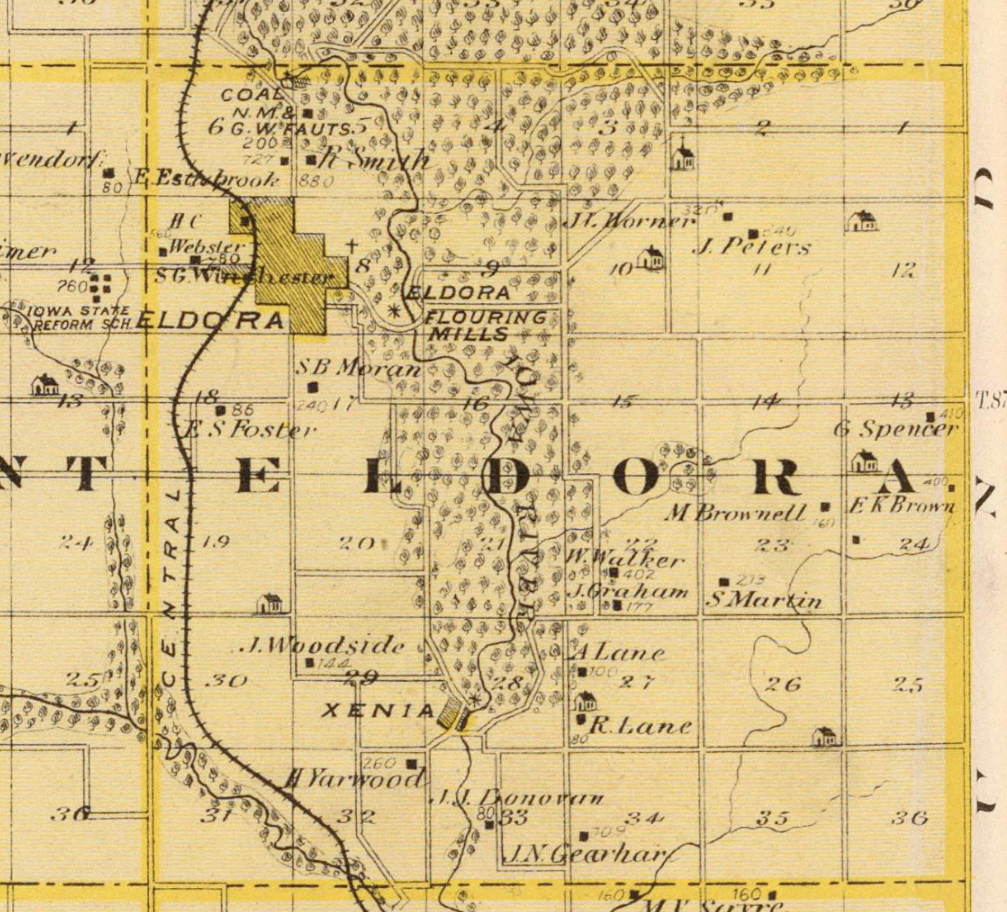
Map of Eldora Township with the towns of Eldora and Xenia, in 1875

=== Early years as Xenia ===
Around 1853, a bridge across the Iowa River at this site was constructed. This was for a time the only bridge across the river in Hardin County. The bridge was reported to be rickety, and the floor of the bridge was reinforced in 1866. The bridge was later said to be a primitive affair.

The village, originally named Xenia, was platted in 1857 by either John G. Parnham and William Patton, or by Robert Allison, on land owned by John Parnham. The original plot was on the southwestern corner of Section 28 of Eldora Township.

During the early years, it was reported that Xenia was "a thriving little village, with a general store, blacksmith and wagon shop, a fine mill, and some fifteen to twenty dwelling houses".

=== Middle years as Delanti ===
The post office in Xenia was renamed Delanti in 1858. This post office operated until 1870. Circa 1865, the community, now named Delanti, was home to about 100 residents. There were three churches in Delanti: Methodist, Baptist, and Christian. A number of stagecoaches crossed through on the bridge. The name has also been spelled Delanta.

By the 1880s, the community was in decline, with only a dozen homes and the mill.

=== Later years as Secor ===
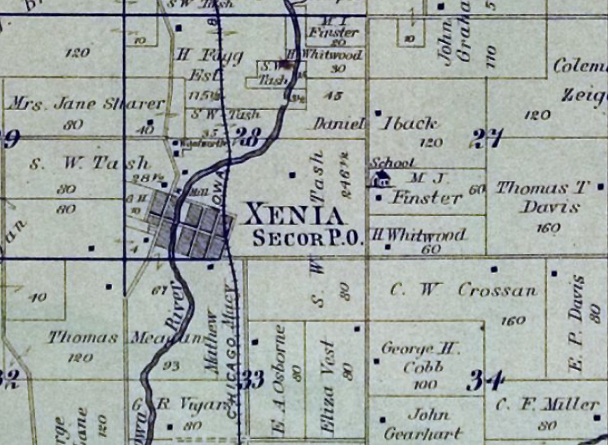
Xenia (Secor) Iowa, 1892

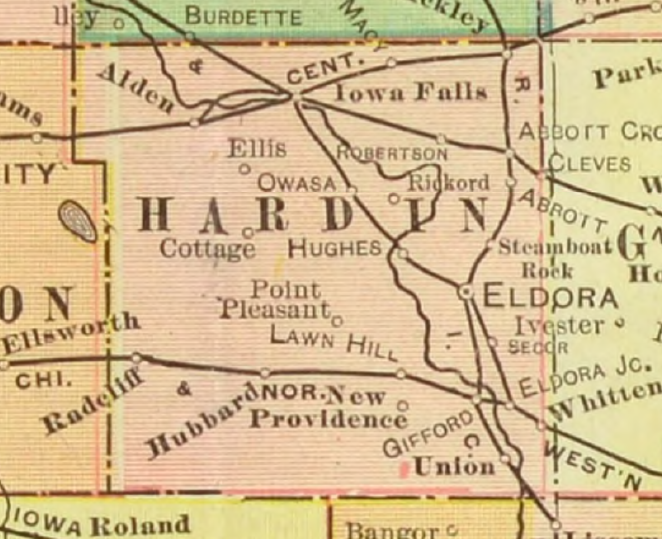
Secor in Hardin County, Iowa, in 1902

The name of the community was changed to Secor, and the original Xenia town plat was vacated. The Chicago and North Western Railroad established a station at Secor. A post office was established at Secor in 1883. Secor's town plat was laid out in 1888, and named for a railroad employee named Secor. Sources differ on the person honored with the name. The Marshalltown Evening Times-Republican stated that the community was named in honor of Eugene Secor of Forest City. The Hardin County Citizen stated that Secor was named in honor of Davide Secor, who, with Judge John Porter, helped finance 29 miles (47 km) of the rail line.

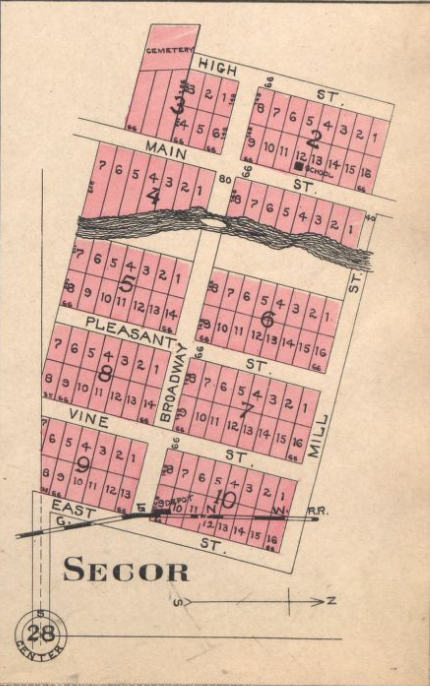
Secor, Iowa plat map from 1903

Secor's town plat was divided into ten blocks, with the school on the western side of the river and the rail line on the eastern side. The north–south streets were named High Street, Main Street, Pleasant Street, Vine Street, and East Street, with the east–west streets being named Broadway Street and Mill Street.

Secor's population was 32 in 1890. The Secor post office closed in 1900. Circa 1912, the old Xenia mill, one of the first buildings in the community, was razed.

The community had a school district which in 1911 had five teachers. This school district was still named the Xenia Independent School District.

In 1911, the steel Secor Bridge across the Iowa River, which had been under repair, collapsed. While there were injuries, no one was killed during the incident because several repair workers were able to somersault out of the way of the collapsing steel arch. The old Secor Bridge was replaced with a new one, spanning 140 feet (43 m) in length, for a sum of $3,434.

=== Decline ===
Despite the presence of a railroad, Secor did not experience significant growth, and the name change did not bring many new residents. In 1921, the Xenia and Secor schoolhouses were sold when the school district was consolidated into the Eldora School District. The Xenia Schoolhouse was sold for $110 and the Secor Schoolhouse for $250. In 1940, Secor's population was 60.

By the late 1940s, Secor was considered a ghost town. Modern-day sources also consider Secor a ghost town, with only a few farms in the area.

The cemetery is marked as Xenia-Secor on some maps.

== See also ==
- Old Kiron, Iowa, another ghost town with multiple names
