= Hughes, Iowa =

Abandoned American town

Coordinates: 42.3975°N 93.1377°W

Hughes is a ghost town in Hardin County, in the U.S. state of Iowa.

== History ==
A post office was established at Hughes in 1890, and remained in operation until it was discontinued in 1901. Hughes was named for H. M. Hughes, a railroad official.

Hughes' population was 15 in 1940.
