= Grant Township, Hardin County, Iowa =

Township in Hardin County, Iowa, U.S.

Coordinates: 42.2489°N 93.2903°W

Grant Township is a township in Hardin County, Iowa, United States.

== History ==
Grant Township was organized in 1868. It is named for Ulysses S. Grant.
