= Buckeye Township, Hardin County, Iowa =

Township in Hardin County, Iowa, U.S.

Coordinates: 42.4342°N 93.3953°W

Buckeye Township is a township in Hardin County, Iowa, United States.

== History ==
Buckeye Township was organized in 1865.
