= Concord Township, Hardin County, Iowa =

Township in Hardin County, Iowa, U.S.

Coordinates: 42.2494°N 93.4003°W

Concord Township is a township in Hardin County, Iowa, United States.

== History ==
Concord Township was organized in 1872.
