= Radcliffe, Iowa =

- City
- Location of Radcliffe, Iowa
- Coordinates: 42°19′04″N 93°26′04″W
- Country: US
- State: Iowa
- County: Hardin

Area
  - Total: 1.00 sq mi (2.58 km^{2})
  - Land: 1.00 sq mi (2.58 km^{2})
  - Water: 0 sq mi (0.00 km^{2})
- Elevation: 1,188 ft (362 m)

Population (2020)
  - Total: 555
  - Density: 556.9/sq mi (215.01/km^{2})
- Time zone: UTC-6 (Central (CST))
  - Summer (DST): UTC-5 (CDT)
- ZIP code: 50230
- Area code: 515
- FIPS code: 19-65370
- GNIS feature ID: 2396305
- Website: cityofradcliffe.municipalimpact.com

Radcliffe is a city in Hardin County, Iowa, United States. The population was 555 at the time of the 2020 census.

== History ==
Radcliffe was laid out in 1880 when the railroad was extended to that point. It was named after the novel The Heir of Redclyffe by Charlotte Mary Yonge.

== Geography ==
According to the United States Census Bureau, the city has a total area of 1.00 square mile (2.59 km^{2}), all land.

== Demographics ==
Historical populations
Year	Pop.	±%
1900	645	—
1910	660	+2.3%
1920	708	+7.3%
1930	627	−11.4%
1940	631	+0.6%
1950	638	+1.1%
1960	615	−3.6%
1970	548	−10.9%
1980	593	+8.2%
1990	574	−3.2%
2000	607	+5.7%
2010	545	−10.2%
2020	555	+1.8%
Source:"U.S. Census website". United States Census Bureau. and Iowa Data Center; Source: U.S. Decennial Census

=== 2020 census ===
As of the census of 2020, there were 555 people, 239 households, and 153 families residing in the city. The population density was 556.9 inhabitants per square mile (215.0/km^{2}). There were 271 housing units at an average density of 271.9 per square mile (105.0/km^{2}). The racial makeup of the city was 91.4% White, 0.2% Black or African American, 0.5% Native American, 0.0% Asian, 0.0% Pacific Islander, 2.7% from other races and 5.2% from two or more races. Hispanic or Latino persons of any race comprised 4.1% of the population.

Of the 239 households, 33.1% of which had children under the age of 18 living with them, 47.7% were married couples living together, 5.4% were cohabitating couples, 25.9% had a female householder with no spouse or partner present and 20.9% had a male householder with no spouse or partner present. 36.0% of all households were non-families. 31.4% of all households were made up of individuals, 14.2% had someone living alone who was 65 years old or older.

The median age in the city was 37.9 years. 29.2% of the residents were under the age of 20; 5.0% were between the ages of 20 and 24; 23.8% were from 25 and 44; 25.9% were from 45 and 64; and 16.0% were 65 years of age or older. The gender makeup of the city was 47.7% male and 52.3% female.

=== 2010 census ===
As of the census of 2010, there were 545 people, 243 households, and 157 families living in the city. The population density was 545.0 inhabitants per square mile (210.4/km^{2}). There were 281 housing units at an average density of 281.0 per square mile (108.5/km^{2}). The racial makeup of the city was 96.1% White, 0.2% Native American, 3.5% from other races, and 0.2% from two or more races. Hispanic or Latino of any race were 5.7% of the population.

There were 243 households, of which 28.0% had children under the age of 18 living with them, 56.4% were married couples living together, 3.7% had a female householder with no husband present, 4.5% had a male householder with no wife present, and 35.4% were non-families. 32.5% of all households were made up of individuals, and 20.1% had someone living alone who was 65 years of age or older. The average household size was 2.24 and the average family size was 2.83.

The median age in the city was 43.5 years. 23.9% of residents were under the age of 18; 4% were between the ages of 18 and 24; 23.1% were from 25 to 44; 26.1% were from 45 to 64; and 22.9% were 65 years of age or older. The gender makeup of the city was 48.8% male and 51.2% female.

=== 2000 census ===
As of the census of 2000, there were 607 people, 252 households, and 165 families living in the city. The population density was 604.3 inhabitants per square mile (233.3/km^{2}). There were 273 housing units at an average density of 271.8 per square mile (104.9/km^{2}). The racial makeup of the city was 96.38% White, 2.47% from other races, and 1.15% from two or more races. Hispanic or Latino of any race were 4.45% of the population.

There were 252 households, out of which 31.3% had children under the age of 18 living with them, 58.3% were married couples living together, 5.6% had a female householder with no husband present, and 34.5% were non-families. 31.0% of all households were made up of individuals, and 19.0% had someone living alone who was 65 years of age or older. The average household size was 2.41 and the average family size was 3.04.

25.9% were under the age of 18, 7.6% from 18 to 24, 27.5% from 25 to 44, 14.5% from 45 to 64, and 24.5% were 65 years of age or older. The median age was 38 years. For every 100 females, there were 91.5 males. For every 100 females age 18 and over, there were 91.5 males.

The median income for a household in the city was $39,417, and the median income for a family was $46,875. Males had a median income of $33,056 versus $22,188 for females. The per capita income for the city was $18,729. None of the families and 1.1% of the population were living below the poverty line, including no under eighteens and none of those over 64.

== Education ==
Hubbard–Radcliffe Community School District is the area school district. The district formed on July 1, 1993, with the merger of the Hubbard and Radcliffe school districts. As of 2019, it has a grade-sharing arrangement with Eldora–New Providence Community School District and operates as "South Hardin Schools".
