= Ellis Township, Hardin County, Iowa =

Township in Hardin County, Iowa, U.S.

Coordinates: 42.4339°N 93.2903°W

Ellis Township is a township in Hardin County, Iowa, United States.

== History ==
Ellis Township was organized in 1856. It was named for Judge Ellis Parker, of Eldora.
