= Etna Township, Hardin County, Iowa =

Township in Hardin County, Iowa, U.S.

Coordinates: 42.5144°N 93.0850°W

Etna Township is a township in Hardin County, Iowa, United States.

== History ==
Etna Township was first settled in 1853.
