= Pleasant Township, Hardin County, Iowa =

Township in Hardin County, Iowa, U.S.

Coordinates: 42.3344°N 93.1808°W

Pleasant Township is a township in Hardin County, Iowa, United States.

== History ==
Pleasant Township was organized in 1854.
