= Eldora–New Providence Community School District =

Public school district in Eldora, Iowa, United States

Coordinates: 42.304485°N 93.301773°W

Location
- Eldora, Iowa Hardin, Hamilton, and Marshall counties United States
- Coordinates: 42.304485, -93.301773

District information
- Type: Local school district
- Grades: K–12
- Superintendent: C.D. Fenster
- Schools: 2
- Budget: $10,610,000 (2020-21)
- NCES District ID: 1910690

Students and staff
- Students: 540 (2022-23)
- Teachers: 45.92 FTE
- Staff: 50.42 FTE
- Student–teacher ratio: 11.76
- Athletic conference: North Iowa Cedar League
- District mascot: Tigers
- Colors: Red and silver

Other information
- Website: www.southhardin.k12.ia.us

Eldora–New Providence Community School District is a rural public school district headquartered in Eldora, Iowa. As of 2019 it has a grade-sharing arrangement with Hubbard–Radcliffe Community School District and operates as "South Hardin Community Schools".

It is mostly in Hardin County, with sections in Grundy and Marshall counties. The district serves Eldora, New Providence, and Owasa.

The district formed on July 1, 1980, with the merger of the Eldora and New Providence school districts. From 1997 to 2006 the district enrollment decreased by 125 students, or 16% of the original total. It began a grade-sharing arrangement with Hubbard–Radcliffe in 2006, with the former housing senior high school and the latter hosting middle school. In 2017 there was a proposal to continue the arrangement until 2023. This was done as other area districts had increased ties and/or consolidated altogether.

== Schools ==
Prior to the grade sharing arrangement, the schools were ENP Elementary School, ENP Middle School, and ENP High School. They are now:

- ENP Elementary, Eldora
- South Hardin Middle School, Hubbard (see Hubbard–Radcliffe Community School District)
- South Hardin High School, Eldora

=== South Hardin High School ===
==== Athletics ====
The Tigers compete in the North Iowa Cedar League Conference in the following sports:

- Cross country
- Volleyball
- Football
- Basketball
- Wrestling
- Track and field
- Golf
- Tennis
- Baseball
- Softball

== Enrollment ==
View source data.

== See also ==
- List of school districts in Iowa
- List of high schools in Iowa
