= Buckeye, Iowa =

- City
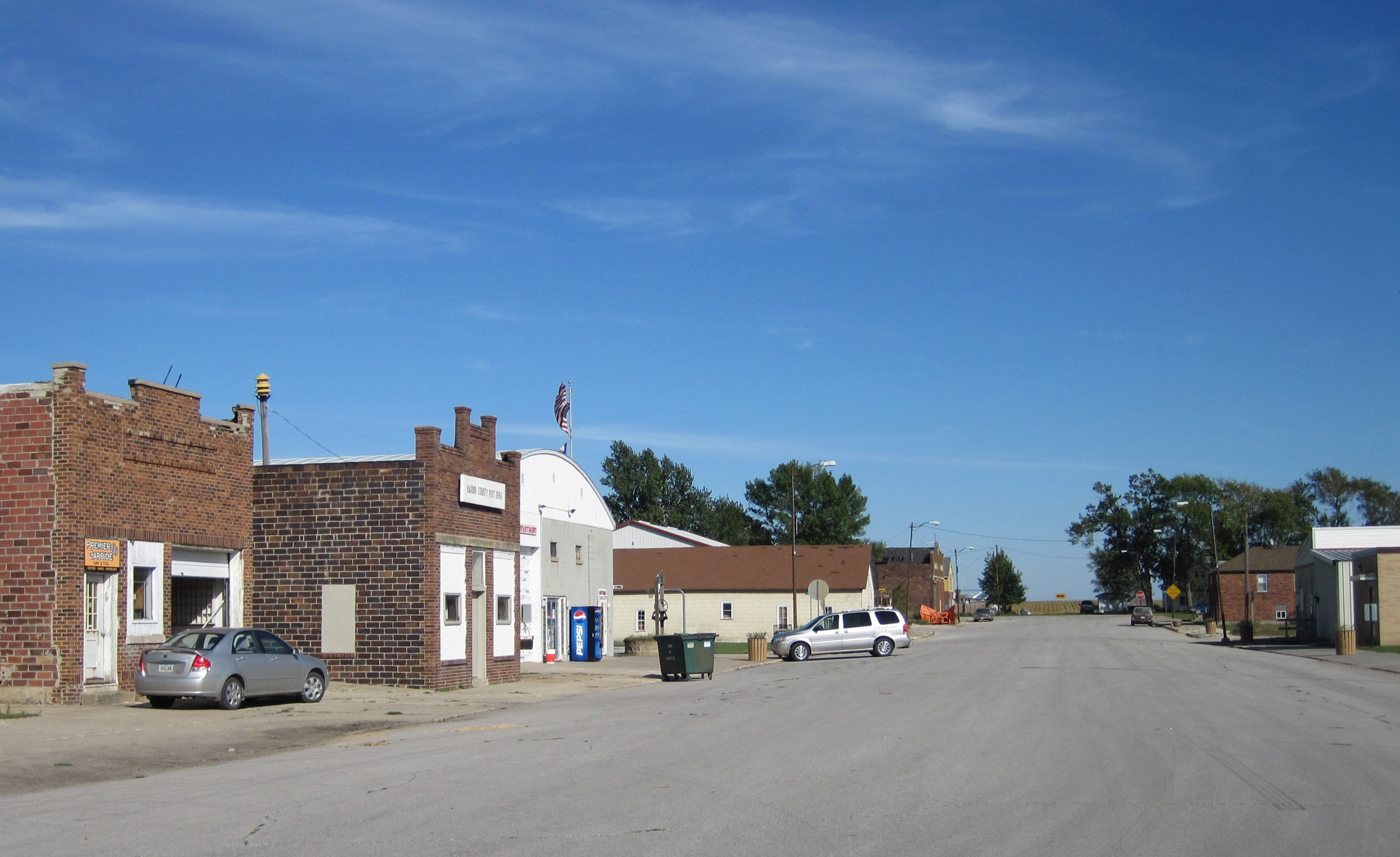
- Street scene in Buckeye

- Location of Buckeye, Iowa
- Coordinates: 42°25′10″N 93°22′23″W
- Country: USA
- State: Iowa
- County: Hardin

Area
  - Total: 0.99 sq mi (2.56 km^{2})
  - Land: 0.99 sq mi (2.56 km^{2})
  - Water: 0 sq mi (0.00 km^{2})
- Elevation: 1,155 ft (352 m)

Population (2020)
  - Total: 86
  - Density: 87.0/sq mi (33.61/km^{2})
- Time zone: UTC-6 (Central (CST))
  - Summer (DST): UTC-5 (CDT)
- ZIP code: 50043
- Area code: 515
- FIPS code: 19-09100
- GNIS feature ID: 2393447

Buckeye is a city in Hardin County, Iowa, United States. The population was 86 at the time of the 2020 census.

== History ==
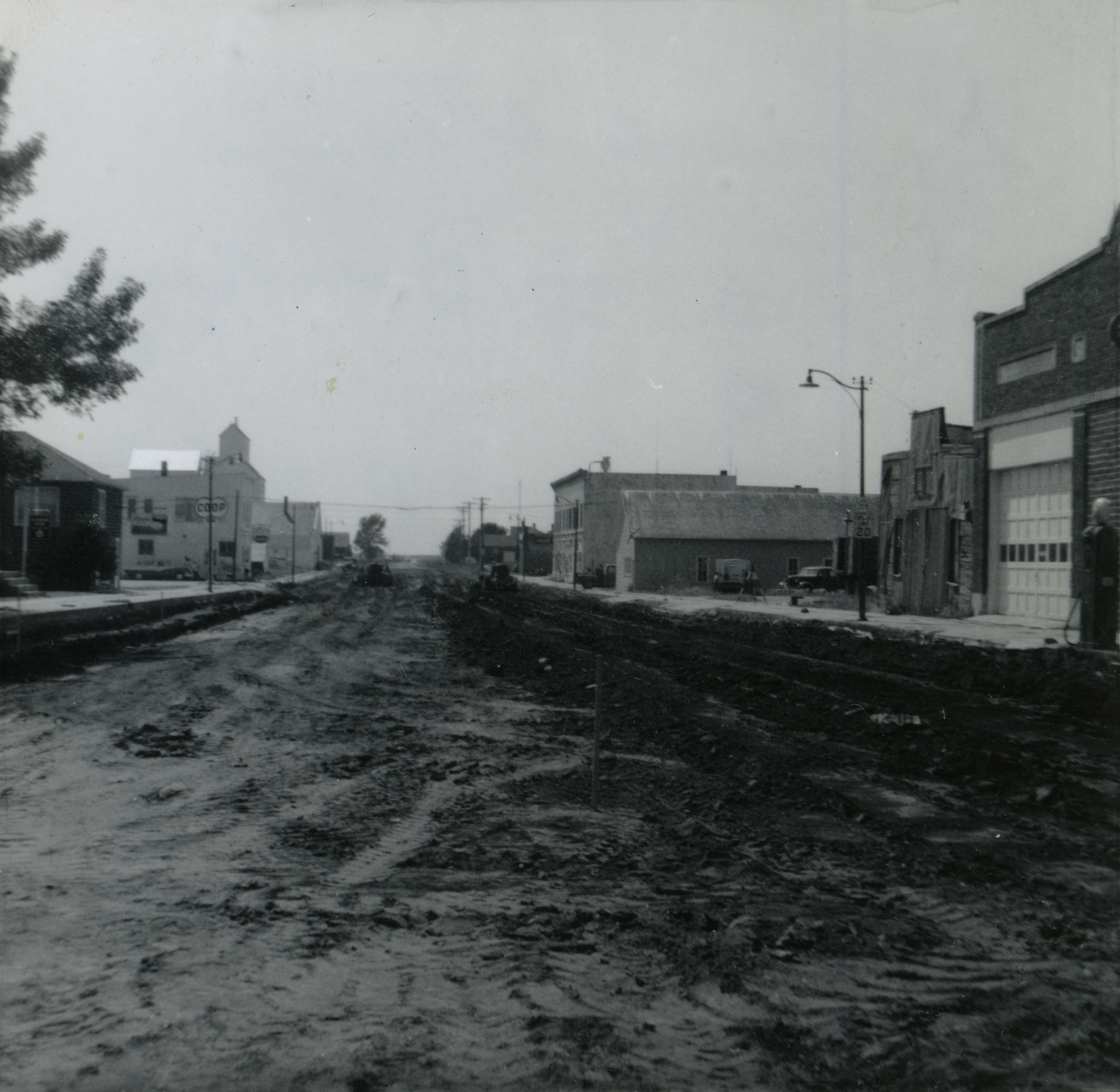
Main Street, Buckeye IA

Buckeye got its start circa 1901, following construction of the railroad through that territory.

== Geography ==
According to the United States Census Bureau, the city has a total area of 1.00 square mile (2.59 km^{2}), all land.

== Demographics ==
Historical populations
Year	Pop.	±%
1910	87	—
1920	91	+4.6%
1930	86	−5.5%
1940	80	−7.0%
1950	67	−16.2%
1960	40	−40.3%
1970	41	+2.5%
1980	84	+104.9%
1990	55	−34.5%
2000	110	+100.0%
2010	108	−1.8%
2020	86	−20.4%
Source:"U.S. Census website". United States Census Bureau. and Iowa Data Center; Source: U.S. Decennial Census

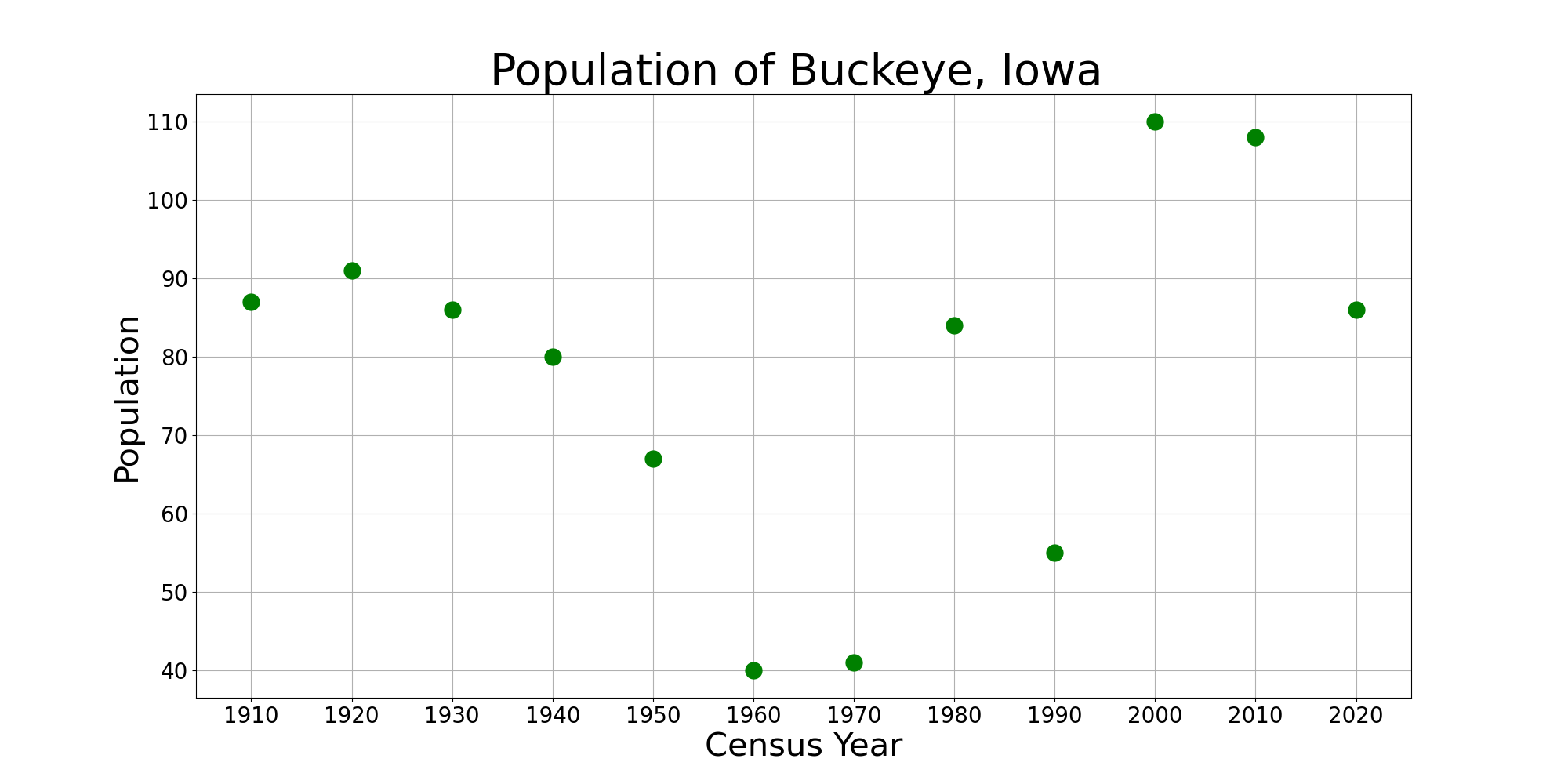
The population of Buckeye, Iowa from US census data

=== 2020 census ===
As of the census of 2020, there were 86 people, 39 households, and 26 families residing in the city. The population density was 87.1 inhabitants per square mile (33.6/km^{2}). There were 48 housing units at an average density of 48.6 per square mile (18.8/km^{2}). The racial makeup of the city was 95.3% White, 0.0% Black or African American, 0.0% Native American, 0.0% Asian, 0.0% Pacific Islander, 0.0% from other races and 4.7% from two or more races. Hispanic or Latino persons of any race comprised 0.0% of the population.

Of the 39 households, 25.6% of which had children under the age of 18 living with them, 38.5% were married couples living together, 7.7% were cohabitating couples, 20.5% had a female householder with no spouse or partner present and 33.3% had a male householder with no spouse or partner present. 33.3% of all households were non-families. 28.2% of all households were made up of individuals, 5.1% had someone living alone who was 65 years old or older.

The median age in the city was 46.5 years. 23.3% of the residents were under the age of 20; 3.5% were between the ages of 20 and 24; 19.8% were from 25 and 44; 25.6% were from 45 and 64; and 27.9% were 65 years of age or older. The gender makeup of the city was 52.3% male and 47.7% female.

=== 2010 census ===
As of the census of 2010, there were 108 people, 44 households, and 29 families living in the city. The population density was 108.0 inhabitants per square mile (41.7/km^{2}). There were 49 housing units at an average density of 49.0 per square mile (18.9/km^{2}). The racial makeup of the city was 100.0% White.

There were 44 households, of which 27.3% had children under the age of 18 living with them, 45.5% were married couples living together, 11.4% had a female householder with no husband present, 9.1% had a male householder with no wife present, and 34.1% were non-families. 27.3% of all households were made up of individuals, and 9.1% had someone living alone who was 65 years of age or older. The average household size was 2.45 and the average family size was 2.86.

The median age in the city was 35 years. 24.1% of residents were under the age of 18; 12% were between the ages of 18 and 24; 25.9% were from 25 to 44; 26.9% were from 45 to 64; and 11.1% were 65 years of age or older. The gender makeup of the city was 57.4% male and 42.6% female.

=== 2000 census ===
As of the census of 2000, there were 110 people, 45 households, and 27 families living in the city. The population density was 109.6 inhabitants per square mile (42.3/km^{2}). There were 50 housing units at an average density of 49.8 per square mile (19.2/km^{2}). The racial makeup of the city was 100.00% White.

There were 45 households, out of which 31.1% had children under the age of 18 living with them, 55.6% were married couples living together, 2.2% had a female householder with no husband present, and 40.0% were non-families. 35.6% of all households were made up of individuals, and 13.3% had someone living alone who was 65 years of age or older. The average household size was 2.44 and the average family size was 3.33.

In the city, the population was spread out, with 25.5% under the age of 18, 11.8% from 18 to 24, 30.0% from 25 to 44, 21.8% from 45 to 64, and 10.9% who were 65 years of age or older. The median age was 35 years. For every 100 females, there were 139.1 males. For every 100 females age 18 and over, there were 141.2 males.

The median income for a household in the city was $24,750, and the median income for a family was $32,500. Males had a median income of $22,375 versus $22,917 for females. The per capita income for the city was $16,880. There were 7.7% of families and 5.3% of the population living below the poverty line, including no under eighteens and 23.8% of those over 64.

== Education ==
Alden Community School District operates public schools serving the community.
