= Hubbard–Radcliffe Community School District =

School district of Hubbard, Iowa

Coordinates: 42.304485°N 93.301773°W

Location
- Hubbard, Iowa Hardin County and Hamilton County United States
- Coordinates: 42.304485, -93.301773

District information
- Type: Local school district
- Grades: K–12
- Established: 1993
- Superintendent: C.D. Fenster
- Budget: $8,625,000 (2020-21)
- NCES District ID: 1914310

Students and staff
- Students: 377 (2022-23)
- Teachers: 26.76 FTE
- Staff: 43.21 FTE
- Student–teacher ratio: 14.09
- Athletic conference: North Iowa Cedar League
- District mascot: Tigers
- Colors: Red and Silver

Other information
- Website: www.southhardin.k12.ia.us

Hubbard–Radcliffe Community School District is a school district headquartered in Hubbard, Iowa. As of 2019, it has a grade-sharing arrangement with Eldora–New Providence Community School District, and operates as "South Hardin Community Schools".

It is mostly in Hardin County, with sections in Hamilton County. The district serves Hubbard and Radcliffe.

== History ==
The district formed on July 1, 1993, with the merger of the Hubbard and Radcliffe school districts. From 1997 to 2006, the district enrollment decreased by 130 students, or 20% of the original total. In 2006 the Iowa Department of Education figures resulted in a projection that the enrollment would, from 2006 to circa 2011, decline by an additional 65 students, or 13%.

It began a grade-sharing arrangement with Hubbard–Radcliffe in 2006, with the former housing senior high school and the latter hosting middle school. There was controversy over this arrangement as different people in different parts of the Hubbard–Radcliffe district preferred grade-sharing with different districts. Residents in northern sections preferred cooperation with the Iowa Falls district, those in southern portions preferred such with the Roland–Story district, and those in the west preferred such with the South Hamilton district; those in eastern sections were satisfied with the arrangement with Eldora–New Providence. Due to the differences in opinion regarding whom to cooperate with, in 2006 about one quarter of the school-aged students living in the Hubbard–Radcliffe boundaries, about 127 in total, chose to enroll in other area school districts. Some parents preferring the South Hamilton district purchased a bus to transport their children there. Tom Barton of the WCF Courier wrote that "many" Hubbard–Radcliffe parents chose South Hamilton schools.

In 2017 there was a proposal to continue the arrangement with Eldora–New Providence until 2023. This was done as other area districts had increased ties and/or consolidated altogether.

== Schools ==
Prior to the grade-sharing agreement, its schools were Hubbard–Radcliffe Elementary School, Hubbard–Radcliffe Middle School, and Hubbard–Radcliffe Senior High School. They are now HR Elementary, South Hardin Middle School and South Hardin High School (along with ENP Elementary).

South Hardin Middle School in Hubbard, serving both grade-sharing districts, was renovated by 2015.

=== South Hardin High School ===
- see Eldora–New Providence Community School District

== Operations ==
The district has entered into multiple agreements with other school districts to share employees; Iowa school districts may share employees to save money (most commonly the superintendent). By 2014, the Hubbard–Radcliffe, GMG, and BCLUW school districts shared a single elementary guidance counselor, and Hubbard–Radcliffe and BCLUW have a single consumer sciences teacher.
