= Eldora Township, Hardin County, Iowa =

Township in Hardin County, Iowa, U.S.

Coordinates: 42.3403°N 93.0553°W

Eldora Township is a township in Hardin County, Iowa, United States.

== History ==
Eldora Township was created in the 1850s.
