= Tipton Township, Hardin County, Iowa =

Township in Hardin County, Iowa, U.S.

Coordinates: 42.3428°N 93.2806°W

Tipton Township is a township in Hardin County, Iowa, United States.

== History ==
Tipton Township was created in 1859. It was named from Tipton Creek, and Tipton Creek was named in honor of John Tipton.
