= Eldora, Iowa =

- City
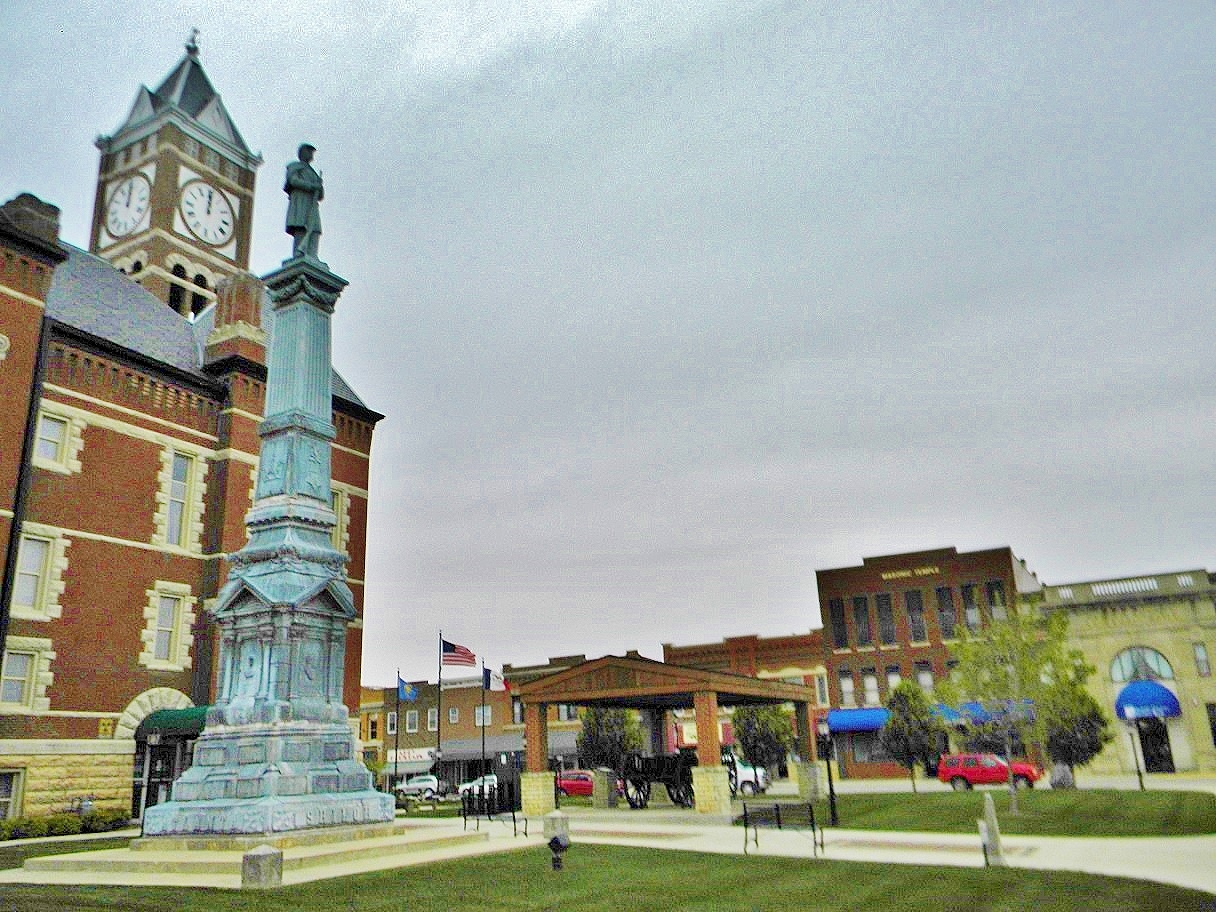
- Hardin County Courthouse in Downtown Eldora
- Motto: "Come and Explore"
- Location of Eldora, Iowa
- Coordinates: 42°21′47″N 93°06′35″W
- Country: USA
- State: Iowa
- County: Hardin

Area
  - Total: 4.28 sq mi (11.09 km^{2})
  - Land: 4.28 sq mi (11.09 km^{2})
  - Water: 0 sq mi (0.00 km^{2})
- Elevation: 1,070 ft (330 m)

Population (2020)
  - Total: 2,663
  - Density: 622.0/sq mi (240.17/km^{2})
- Time zone: UTC-6 (Central (CST))
  - Summer (DST): UTC-5 (CDT)
- ZIP code: 50627
- Area code: 641
- FIPS code: 19-24465
- GNIS feature ID: 467769
- Website: www.eldoraiowa.com

Eldora is a city and the county seat of Hardin County, Iowa, United States. The population was 2,663 at the time of the 2020 census. It is the county seat of Hardin County.

== History ==
Eldora was platted in 1853. It was incorporated on July 1, 1895.

The name Eldora was given to the town by a local mother in honor of her dead infant daughter. It is derived from the Spanish name for "the gilded".

== Geography ==
According to the United States Census Bureau, the city has a total area of 4.33 square miles (11.21 km^{2}), all land.

Eldora is located on east edge of the Altmont Moraine, the glacial moraine that marks the east border of the Des Moines Lobe of the Wisconsin Glaciation. The town is just west of the gorge of the Iowa River that borders the moraine. The river here has cut through the sandstone bedrock underlying the moraine.

=== Climate ===
Designated as having a humid continental climate, this region typically has a large seasonal temperature differences, with warm to hot (and often humid) summers and cold (sometimes severely cold) winters. Precipitation is relatively well distributed year-round in many areas with this climate. The Köppen Climate Classification subtype for this climate is "Dfa" (Hot Summer Continental Climate).

Climate data for Eldora, Iowa (1991–2020)
Month	Jan	Feb	Mar	Apr	May	Jun	Jul	Aug	Sep	Oct	Nov	Dec	Year
Mean daily maximum °F (°C)	25.8 (−3.4)	30.7 (−0.7)	44.1 (6.7)	58.7 (14.8)	70.4 (21.3)	80.3 (26.8)	83.5 (28.6)	81.5 (27.5)	75.5 (24.2)	61.7 (16.5)	45.0 (7.2)	31.6 (−0.2)	57.4 (14.1)
Daily mean °F (°C)	17.1 (−8.3)	21.6 (−5.8)	34.1 (1.2)	47.0 (8.3)	59.2 (15.1)	69.4 (20.8)	72.7 (22.6)	70.4 (21.3)	63.0 (17.2)	50.0 (10.0)	35.4 (1.9)	23.3 (−4.8)	46.9 (8.3)
Mean daily minimum °F (°C)	8.4 (−13.1)	12.6 (−10.8)	24.1 (−4.4)	35.3 (1.8)	48.0 (8.9)	58.6 (14.8)	61.9 (16.6)	59.4 (15.2)	50.5 (10.3)	38.2 (3.4)	25.8 (−3.4)	15.0 (−9.4)	36.5 (2.5)
Average precipitation inches (mm)	1.06 (27)	1.21 (31)	2.09 (53)	3.95 (100)	5.21 (132)	5.88 (149)	4.06 (103)	4.53 (115)	3.56 (90)	2.80 (71)	1.88 (48)	1.62 (41)	37.85 (960)
Average snowfall inches (cm)	8.1 (21)	8.8 (22)	4.0 (10)	1.4 (3.6)	0.4 (1.0)	0.0 (0.0)	0.0 (0.0)	0.0 (0.0)	0.0 (0.0)	0.3 (0.76)	1.8 (4.6)	8.4 (21)	33.2 (83.96)
Source: NOAA

== Demographics ==
Historical populations
Year	Pop.	±%
1870	1,268	—
1880	1,584	+24.9%
1890	1,577	−0.4%
1900	2,233	+41.6%
1910	1,995	−10.7%
1920	3,189	+59.8%
1930	3,200	+0.3%
1940	3,553	+11.0%
1950	3,107	−12.6%
1960	3,225	+3.8%
1970	3,223	−0.1%
1980	3,063	−5.0%
1990	3,038	−0.8%
2000	3,035	−0.1%
2010	2,732	−10.0%
2020	2,663	−2.5%
Source:"U.S. Census website". United States Census Bureau. and Iowa Data Center; Source: U.S. Decennial Census

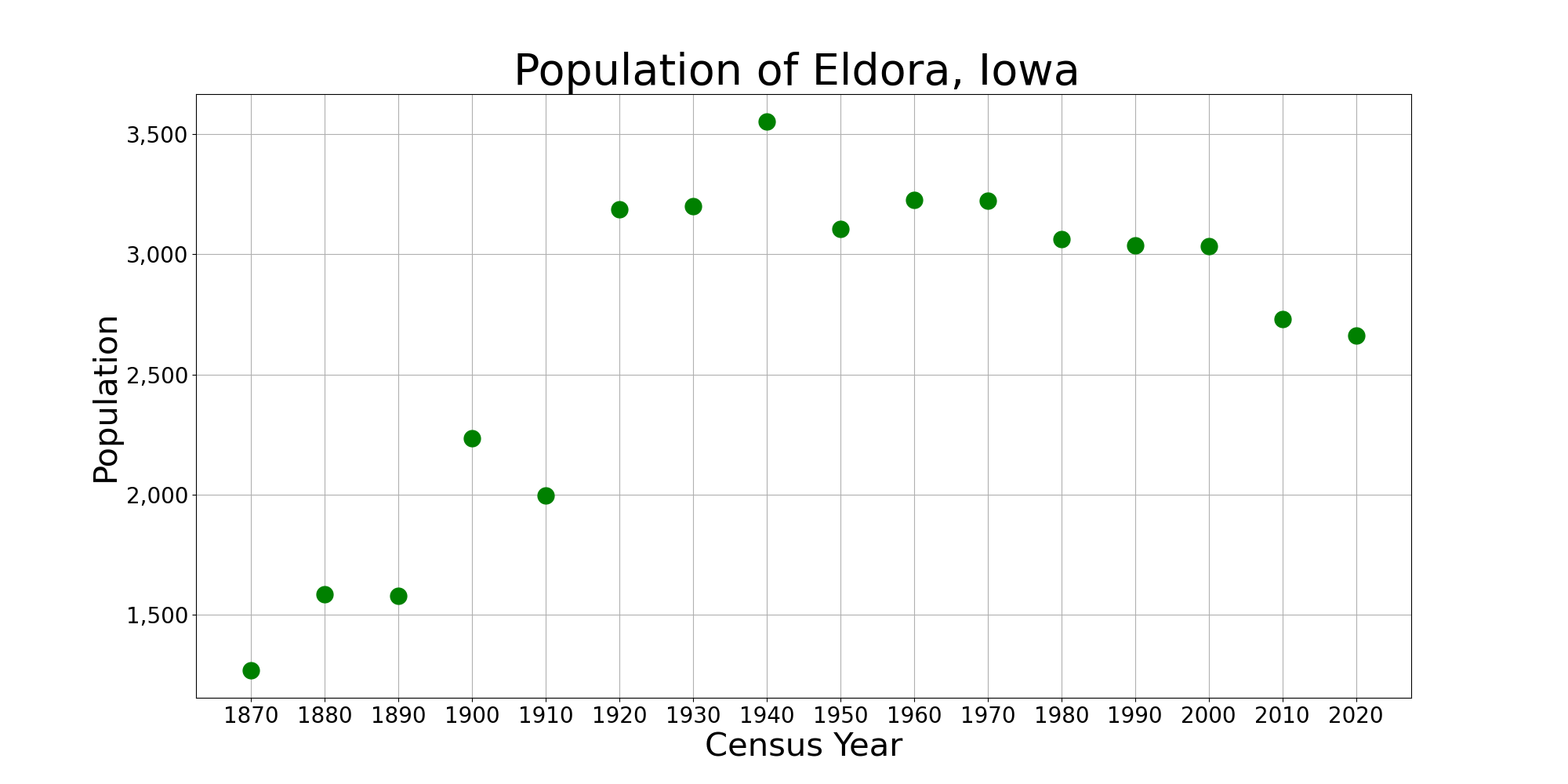
The population of Eldora, Iowa from US census data

=== 2020 census ===
As of the 2020 census, Eldora had a population of 2,663, with 1,096 households and 632 families. The population density was 622.0 inhabitants per square mile (240.2/km^{2}). There were 1,276 housing units at an average density of 298.1 per square mile (115.1/km^{2}).

There were 1,096 households in Eldora, of which 24.9% had children under the age of 18 living in them. Of all households, 43.5% were married-couple households, 7.6% were cohabitating-couple households, 20.3% were households with a male householder and no spouse or partner present, and 28.6% were households with a female householder and no spouse or partner present. About 42.3% of households were non-families, 36.7% were made up of individuals, and 19.4% had someone living alone who was 65 years of age or older.

The median age was 43.3 years. 27.3% of residents were under the age of 20; 3.9% were between the ages of 20 and 24; 19.8% were from 25 to 44; 25.3% were from 45 to 64; and 23.7% were 65 years of age or older. The gender makeup of the city was 50.7% male and 49.3% female. For every 100 females, there were 102.7 males, and for every 100 females age 18 and over there were 96.1 males age 18 and over.

Of housing units, 14.1% were vacant. The homeowner vacancy rate was 3.2% and the rental vacancy rate was 9.6%. 0.0% of residents lived in urban areas, while 100.0% lived in rural areas.

Racial composition as of the 2020 census
Race	Number	Percent
White	2,387	89.6%
Black or African American	62	2.3%
American Indian and Alaska Native	6	0.2%
Asian	20	0.8%
Native Hawaiian and Other Pacific Islander	3	0.1%
Some other race	45	1.7%
Two or more races	140	5.3%
Hispanic or Latino (of any race)	96	3.6%

=== 2010 census ===
At the 2010 census there were 2,732 people, 1,079 households, and 671 families living in the city. The population density was 630.9 inhabitants per square mile (243.6/km^{2}). There were 1,275 housing units at an average density of 294.5 per square mile (113.7/km^{2}). The racial makup of the city was 94.8% White, 2.0% African American, 0.3% Native American, 0.6% Asian, 0.7% from other races, and 1.6% from two or more races. Hispanic or Latino of any race were 3.7%.

Of the 1,079 households 27.7% had children under the age of 18 living with them, 48.7% were married couples living together, 8.6% had a female householder with no husband present, 4.8% had a male householder with no wife present, and 37.8% were non-families. 33.1% of households were one person and 17.7% were one person aged 65 or older. The average household size was 2.27 and the average family size was 2.87.

The median age was 41.6 years. 26.5% of residents were under the age of 18; 6.8% were between the ages of 18 and 24; 20.4% were from 25 to 44; 25.8% were from 45 to 64; and 20.5% were 65 or older. The gender makeup of the city was 51.7% male and 48.3% female.

=== 2000 census ===
At the 2000 census there were 3,035 people, 1,193 households, and 742 families living in the city. The population density was 698.4 inhabitants per square mile (269.7/km^{2}). There were 1,314 housing units at an average density of 302.4 per square mile (116.8/km^{2}). The racial makup of the city was 95.49% White, 1.32% African American, 0.23% Native American, 0.69% Asian, 0.23% Pacific Islander, 1.55% from other races, and 0.49% from two or more races. Hispanic or Latino of any race were 2.97%.

Of the 1,193 households 30.3% had children under the age of 18 living with them, 49.7% were married couples living together, 9.0% had a female householder with no husband present, and 37.8% were non-families. 34.2% of households were one person and 17.6% were one person aged 65 or older. The average household size was 2.27 and the average family size was 2.89.

29.8% are under the age of 18, 6.6% from 18 to 24, 22.2% from 25 to 44, 20.6% from 45 to 64, and 20.9% 65 or older. The median age was 39 years. For every 100 females, there were 99.1 males. For every 100 females age 18 and over, there were 82.1 males.

The median household income was $33,170 and the median family income was $39,421. Males had a median income of $31,545 versus $17,891 for females. The per capita income for the city was $15,459. About 5.9% of families and 6.9% of the population were below the poverty line, including 6.6% of those under age 18 and 2.9% of those age 65 or over.

== Education ==
The community is within the Eldora–New Providence Community School District, which formed on July 1, 1980, with the merger of the Eldora and New Providence school districts. As of 2019, it has a grade-sharing arrangement with Hubbard–Radcliffe Community School District and operates as "South Hardin Schools". South Hardin High School is located in Eldora. Mr. Michael Rundall serves as Principal (2016). South Hardin Middle School is located in Hubbard. Mrs. Sarah Nachazel serves as Principal (2019).

== Media ==
The Eldora Herald-Ledger is a weekly newspaper covering both Eldora and Hardin County events including the schools AGWSR, BCLUW, and South Hardin. It was last owned and operated by Mid America Publishing and eased publication March 31, 2026.

KDAO-FM, 92.9 is currently owned and operated by OnTheGoMedia. As of July 6, 2026 the station has been known as "Rewind 93"...playing pop hits of the 1990's and early 2000's. The channel also broadcasts local news and covers a variety of schools for sports broadcasts, including the South Hardin Tigers.

== Parks and recreation ==
Eldora is located adjacent to the Iowa River and Pine Lake State Park.

== Infrastructure ==
The city is the location of the State Training School for Boys, a school for male juvenile delinquents.

== Notable people ==
- George C. Armstrong, Illinois state senator and newspaper editor; born in Eldora.
- Thomas DeBaggio, (1942–2011) Journalist and author
- George Gardner Fagg, Senior United States federal judge on the United States Court of Appeals for the Eighth Circuit; born in Eldora.
- Jonathan Hole, actor in vaudeville, radio, TV, and film; born in Eldora.
- Mona Van Duyn, winner of the 1991 Pulitzer Prize for Poetry and the 1992–1993 U.S. Poet Laureate; grew up in Eldora.

== Twister movie ==
The city is most famous for the shooting of the 1996 movie Twister on location. The true final part of the climactic tornado was filmed at the old Follett house in Eldora which is now a private home.

== See also ==
Buildings listed on the National Register of Historic Places:

- First Congregational Church
- Hardin County Courthouse
