= Lawn Hill, Iowa =

- Unincorporated community
- Location within Iowa Location within the United States
- Coordinates: 42°17′52″N 93°10′19″W
- Country: United States
- State: Iowa
- County: Hardin
- Elevation: 1,089 ft (332 m)
- Time zone: UTC-6 (Central (CST))
  - Summer (DST): UTC-5 (CDT)
- ZIP code: 50206
- FIPS code: 19-52140
- GNIS feature ID: 0464614

Lawn Hill is an unincorporated community in Hardin County, in the U.S. state of Iowa. It is located north of New Providence.

== History ==
Lawn Hill was platted in 1880. The community contained a post office from 1881 until 1943. Lawn Hill's population was 25 in 1902, 22 in 1915, and 61 in 1925. The population was 50 in 1940.
