= Union, Iowa =

- City
- Location of Union, Iowa
- Coordinates: 42°14′51″N 93°03′40″W
- Country: USA
- State: Iowa
- County: Hardin

Area
  - Total: 0.57 sq mi (1.48 km^{2})
  - Land: 0.57 sq mi (1.48 km^{2})
  - Water: 0 sq mi (0.00 km^{2})
- Elevation: 929 ft (283 m)

Population (2020)
  - Total: 399
  - Density: 698.8/sq mi (269.82/km^{2})
- Time zone: UTC-6 (Central (CST))
  - Summer (DST): UTC-5 (CDT)
- ZIP codes: 50258-50259
- Area code: 641
- FIPS code: 19-79545
- GNIS feature ID: 2397085

Union is a city in Hardin County, Iowa, United States. The population was 399 at the time of the 2020 census.

== History ==
Union was laid out in 1868 and was incorporated as a town in 1874.

== Geography ==
According to the United States Census Bureau, the city has a total area of 0.55 square miles (1.42 km^{2}), all land.

== Demographics ==
Historical populations
Year	Pop.	±%
1880	666	—
1890	514	−22.8%
1900	589	+14.6%
1910	540	−8.3%
1920	660	+22.2%
1930	498	−24.5%
1940	585	+17.5%
1950	490	−16.2%
1960	534	+9.0%
1970	484	−9.4%
1980	515	+6.4%
1990	448	−13.0%
2000	427	−4.7%
2010	397	−7.0%
2020	399	+0.5%
Source:"U.S. Census website". United States Census Bureau. and Iowa Data Center; Source: U.S. Decennial Census

=== 2020 census ===
As of the census of 2020, there were 399 people, 160 households, and 104 families residing in the city. The population density was 698.8 inhabitants per square mile (269.8/km^{2}). There were 188 housing units at an average density of 329.3 per square mile (127.1/km^{2}). The racial makeup of the city was 93.5% White, 0.8% Black or African American, 0.0% Native American, 1.0% Asian, 0.0% Pacific Islander, 0.5% from other races and 4.3% from two or more races. Hispanic or Latino persons of any race comprised 3.5% of the population.

Of the 160 households, 23.1% of which had children under the age of 18 living with them, 43.1% were married couples living together, 5.6% were cohabitating couples, 26.9% had a female householder with no spouse or partner present and 24.4% had a male householder with no spouse or partner present. 35.0% of all households were non-families. 32.5% of all households were made up of individuals, 16.2% had someone living alone who was 65 years old or older.

The median age in the city was 45.7 years. 27.8% of the residents were under the age of 20; 2.8% were between the ages of 20 and 24; 18.5% were from 25 and 44; 25.3% were from 45 and 64; and 25.6% were 65 years of age or older. The gender makeup of the city was 49.4% male and 50.6% female.

=== 2010 census ===
As of the census of 2010, there were 397 people, 172 households, and 105 families living in the city. The population density was 721.8 inhabitants per square mile (278.7/km^{2}). There were 200 housing units at an average density of 363.6 per square mile (140.4/km^{2}). The racial makeup of the city was 96.0% White, 0.5% African American, 0.3% Native American, 0.3% Asian, 1.5% from other races, and 1.5% from two or more races. Hispanic or Latino of any race were 3.0% of the population.

There were 172 households, of which 25.0% had children under the age of 18 living with them, 52.3% were married couples living together, 5.2% had a female householder with no husband present, 3.5% had a male householder with no wife present, and 39.0% were non-families. 34.9% of all households were made up of individuals, and 19.7% had someone living alone who was 65 years of age or older. The average household size was 2.31 and the average family size was 2.94.

The median age in the city was 43.9 years. 25.7% of residents were under the age of 18; 7.2% were between the ages of 18 and 24; 17.9% were from 25 to 44; 28.1% were from 45 to 64; and 20.9% were 65 years of age or older. The gender makeup of the city was 49.1% male and 50.9% female.

=== 2000 census ===
As of the census of 2000, there were 427 people, 183 households, and 124 families living in the city. The population density was 772.8 inhabitants per square mile (298.4/km^{2}). There were 209 housing units at an average density of 378.3 per square mile (146.1/km^{2}). The racial makeup of the city was 99.06% White, 0.23% African American and 0.70% Native American. Hispanic or Latino of any race were 0.70% of the population.

There were 183 households, out of which 27.3% had children under the age of 18 living with them, 59.0% were married couples living together, 4.9% had a female householder with no husband present, and 32.2% were non-families. 29.5% of all households were made up of individuals, and 19.1% had someone living alone who was 65 years of age or older. The average household size was 2.33 and the average family size was 2.87.

In the city, the population was spread out, with 24.1% under the age of 18, 7.5% from 18 to 24, 23.7% from 25 to 44, 23.4% from 45 to 64, and 21.3% who were 65 years of age or older. The median age was 41 years. For every 100 females, there were 92.3 males. For every 100 females age 18 and over, there were 90.6 males.

The median income for a household in the city was $34,792, and the median income for a family was $39,792. Males had a median income of $25,417 versus $20,000 for females. The per capita income for the city was $16,370. About 8.8% of families and 12.0% of the population were below the poverty line, including 17.0% of those under age 18 and 6.2% of those age 65 or over.

== Education ==
BCLUW Community School District operates public schools serving Union. The schools are BCLUW Elementary School in Conrad, BCLUW Middle School in Union, and BCLUW High School in Conrad.

The Union-Whitten school district served Union until July 1, 1992, when it merged into BCLUW.

== Notable people ==
- Ulysses Grant Whitney (1864–1938), politician and lawyer

== See also ==
- List of cities in Iowa
