= Hardin County, Iowa =

County in Iowa, United States

- County
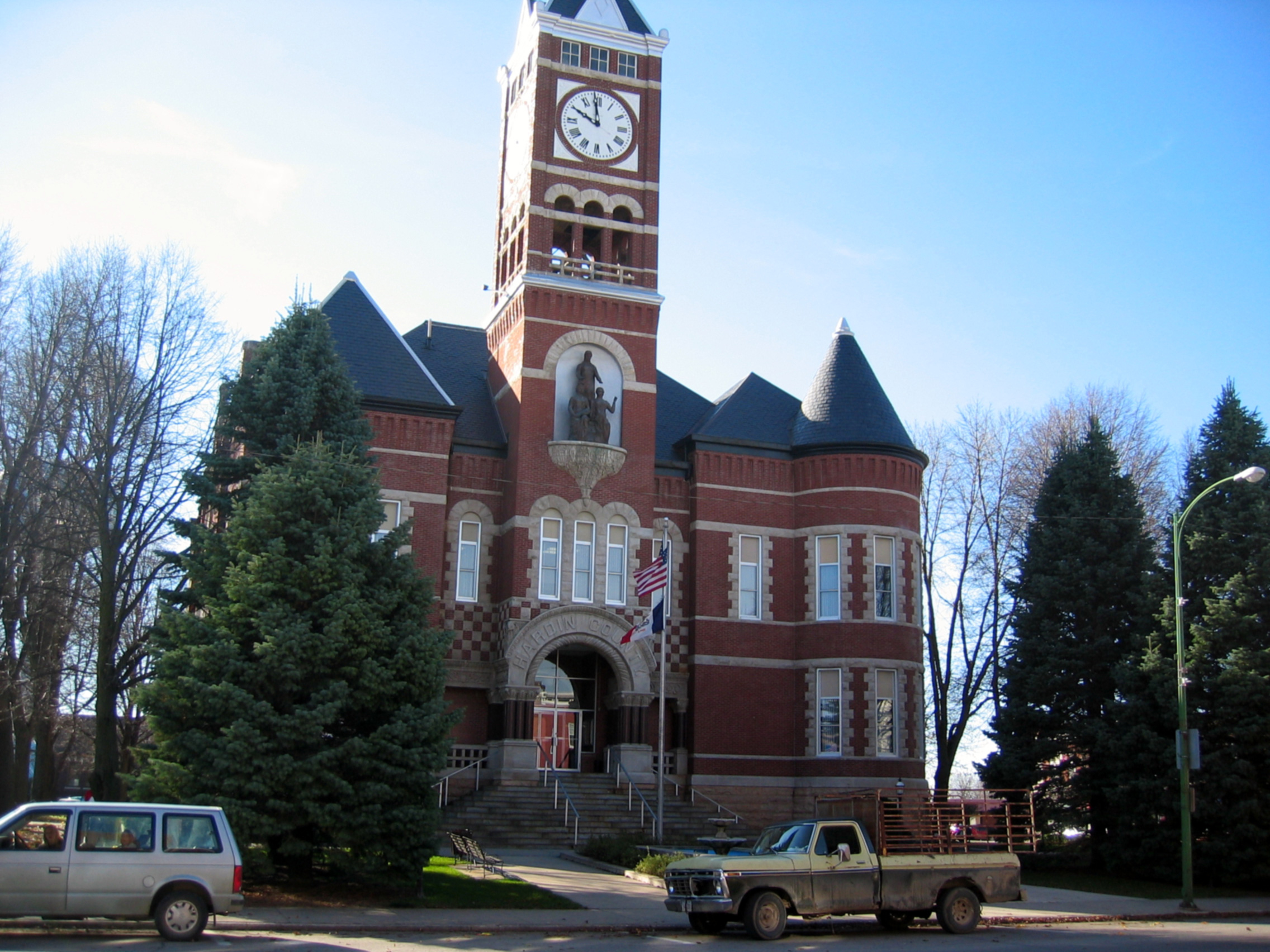
- The Hardin County Courthouse in Eldora

- Location within the U.S. state of Iowa
- Coordinates: 42°22′26″N 93°14′41″W
- Country: United States
- State: Iowa
- Founded: 1851
- Named for: John J. Hardin
- Seat: Eldora
- Largest city: Iowa Falls

Area
  - Total: 570 sq mi (1,500 km^{2})
  - Land: 569 sq mi (1,470 km^{2})
  - Water: 0.7 sq mi (1.8 km^{2}) 0.1%

Population (2020)
  - Total: 16,878
  - Estimate (2025): 16,455 ▼
  - Density: 29.7/sq mi (11.5/km^{2})
- Time zone: UTC−6 (Central)
  - Summer (DST): UTC−5 (CDT)
- Congressional district: 2nd
- Website: www.hardincountyia.gov
- Iowa county number 42

Hardin County is a county located in the U.S. state of Iowa. As of the 2020 census, the population was 16,878. The county seat is Eldora. The county was named in honor of Col. John J. Hardin, of Illinois, who was killed in the Mexican–American War.

== History ==
Hardin County was formed in 1851. It was named after Colonel John J. Hardin, who died in the Mexican–American War.

In its history the county has had three courthouses. The first was a small wood-framed building, which burned down in the 1850s. The second courthouse was a two-story building and stood on the site of the current office of the county sheriff. The third and present courthouse was constructed in 1892 and opened on September 19, 1893. The structure was listed on the National Register of Historic Places in 1981.

Hardin County, along with Story County, was also a primary filming location for the 1996 movie Twister, starring Bill Paxton and Helen Hunt.

== Geography ==
According to the U.S. Census Bureau, the county has a total area of 570 square miles (1,500 km^{2}), of which 569 square miles (1,470 km^{2}) is land and 0.7 square miles (1.8 km^{2}) (0.1%) is water.

=== Major highways ===
- U.S. Highway 20
- U.S. Highway 65
- Iowa Highway 57
- Iowa Highway 175

=== Adjacent counties ===
- Franklin County (north)
- Butler County (northeast)
- Grundy County (east)
- Marshall County (southeast)
- Story County (southwest)
- Hamilton County (west)
- Wright County, Iowa (northwest)

== Demographics ==
Historical population
Census	Pop.	Note	%±
1860	5,440		—
1870	13,684		151.5%
1880	17,807		30.1%
1890	19,003		6.7%
1900	22,794		19.9%
1910	20,921		−8.2%
1920	23,337		11.5%
1930	22,947		−1.7%
1940	22,530		−1.8%
1950	22,218		−1.4%
1960	22,533		1.4%
1970	22,248		−1.3%
1980	21,776		−2.1%
1990	19,094		−12.3%
2000	18,812		−1.5%
2010	17,534		−6.8%
2020	16,878		−3.7%
2025 (est.)	16,455	▼	−2.5%
U.S. Decennial Census; 1790–1960 1900–1990; 1990–2000 2010–2020

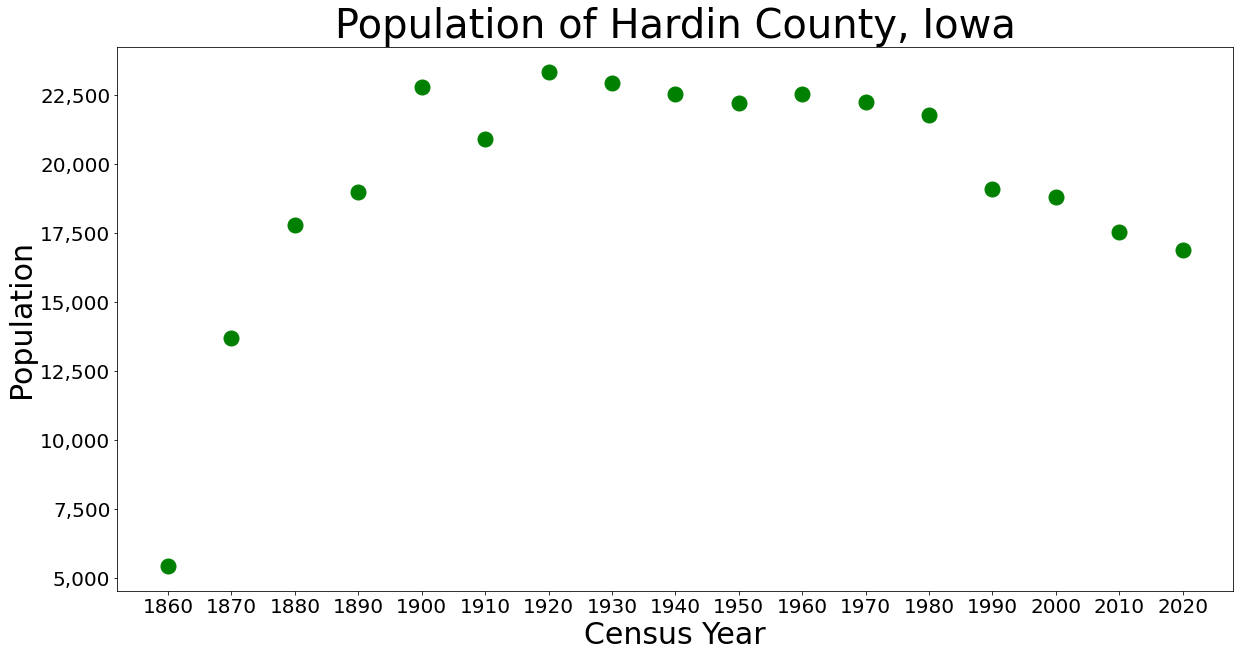
Population of Hardin County from US census data

=== 2020 census ===
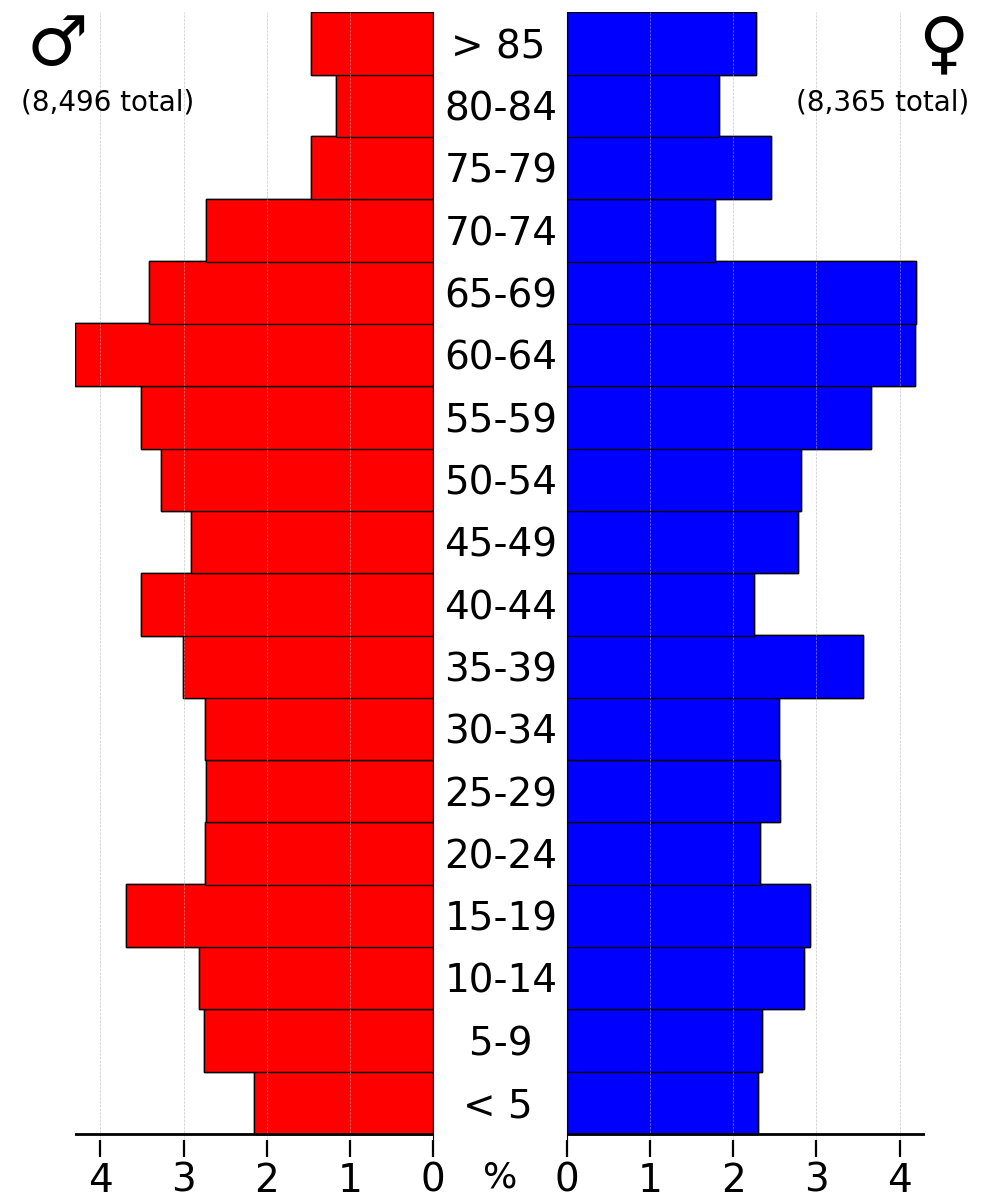
2022 US Census population pyramid for Hardin County from ACS 5-year estimates

As of the 2020 census, the county had a population of 16,878 and a population density of 29.1/sq mi (11.3/km^{2}). 95.71% of the population reported being of one race.

As of the 2020 census, the racial makeup of the county was 91.6% White, 0.9% Black or African American, 0.2% American Indian and Alaska Native, 0.5% Asian, <0.1% Native Hawaiian and Pacific Islander, 2.4% from some other race, and 4.3% from two or more races. Hispanic or Latino residents of any race comprised 4.8% of the population.

Hardin County, Iowa Racial Composition
Race	Number	Percent
White alone (NH)	15,292	90.60%
Black or African American alone (NH)	144	0.85%
Native American or Alaska Native alone (NH)	25	0.15%
Asian alone (NH)	86	0.51%
Pacific Islander alone (NH)	2	0.01%
Other race alone (NH)	32	0.19%
Mixed race or multiracial (NH)	479	2.84%
Hispanic or Latino (any race)	818	4.85%

As of the 2020 census, the median age was 43.5 years. 22.6% of residents were under the age of 18 and 23.2% of residents were 65 years of age or older. For every 100 females there were 100.0 males, and for every 100 females age 18 and over there were 97.9 males age 18 and over.

As of the 2020 census, there were 7,070 households in the county, of which 26.0% had children under the age of 18 living in them. Of all households, 50.1% were married-couple households, 19.9% were households with a male householder and no spouse or partner present, and 23.8% were households with a female householder and no spouse or partner present. About 32.5% of all households were made up of individuals and 16.6% had someone living alone who was 65 years of age or older. There were 8,032 housing units, of which 12.0% were vacant. Among occupied housing units, 74.8% were owner-occupied and 25.2% were renter-occupied. The homeowner vacancy rate was 2.1% and the rental vacancy rate was 11.3%.

As of the 2020 census, 30.0% of residents lived in urban areas, while 70.0% lived in rural areas.

=== 2010 census ===
The 2010 census recorded a population of 17,534 in the county, with a population density of 30.8/sq mi (11.9/km^{2}). There were 8,224 housing units, of which 7,296 were occupied.

=== 2000 census ===
As of the census of 2000, there were 18,812 people, 7,628 households, and 5,087 families residing in the county. The population density was 33 people per square mile (13 people/km^{2}). There were 8,318 housing units at an average density of 15 units per square mile (5.8 units/km^{2}). The racial makeup of the county was 97.14% White, 0.62% Black or African American, 0.13% Native American, 0.32% Asian, 0.05% Pacific Islander, 1.24% from other races, and 0.50% from two or more races. 2.42% of the population were Hispanic or Latino of any race.

There were 7,628 households, out of which 29.50% had children under the age of 18 living with them, 57.10% were married couples living together, 6.50% had a female householder with no husband present, and 33.30% were non-families. 29.40% of all households were made up of individuals, and 15.70% had someone living alone who was 65 years of age or older. The average household size was 2.35 and the average family size was 2.91.

In the county, the population was spread out, with 24.70% under the age of 18, 8.40% from 18 to 24, 23.80% from 25 to 44, 22.40% from 45 to 64, and 20.70% who were 65 years of age or older. The median age was 41 years. For every 100 females there were 95.70 males. For every 100 females age 18 and over, there were 90.10 males.

The median income for a household in the county was $35,429, and the median income for a family was $41,891. Males had a median income of $30,515 versus $21,068 for females. The per capita income for the county was $17,537. About 5.50% of families and 8.00% of the population were below the poverty line, including 9.90% of those under age 18 and 6.20% of those age 65 or over.

== Communities ==
=== Cities ===
- Ackley
- Alden
- Buckeye
- Eldora
- Hubbard
- Iowa Falls
- New Providence
- Owasa
- Radcliffe
- Steamboat Rock
- Union
- Whitten

=== Census-designated place ===
- Garden City

=== Other unincorporated communities ===
- Abbott
- Berlin
- Cleves
- Cottage
- Gifford
- Hughes
- Lawn Hill
- Macy
- Quebec
- Robertson
- Secor/Xenia
- Sherman
- Wilke

=== Townships ===
- Alden
- Buckeye
- Clay
- Concord
- Eldora
- Ellis
- Etna
- Grant
- Hardin
- Jackson
- Pleasant
- Providence
- Sherman
- Tipton
- Union

=== Population ranking ===
The population ranking of the following table is based on the 2020 census of Hardin County.

† county seat

Rank	City/Town/etc.	Municipal type	Population (2020 Census)
1	Iowa Falls	City	5,106
2	† Eldora	City	2,663
3	Ackley (partially in Franklin County)	City	1,599
4	Hubbard	City	860
5	Alden	City	763
6	Radcliffe	City	555
7	Union	City	399
8	Steamboat Rock	City	264
9	New Providence	City	236
10	Whitten	City	100
11	Garden City	CDP	100
12	Buckeye	City	86
13	Owasa	City	34

== Politics ==
For most of its history, Hardin County has primarily supported the Republican Party in presidential elections, with only five of the party's candidates failing to win the county in the period from 1880 to 1984. The only Democrat since 1996 to win the county has been Barack Obama in 2008, winning by only 78 votes.

United States presidential election results for Hardin County, Iowa
Year	Republican		Democratic		Third party(ies)	
Year	No.	%	No.	%	No.	%
1896	3,575	68.46%	1,568	30.03%	79	1.51%
1900	3,741	72.63%	1,268	24.62%	142	2.76%
1904	3,643	78.94%	749	16.23%	223	4.83%
1908	3,123	69.76%	1,187	26.51%	167	3.73%
1912	732	16.43%	1,072	24.07%	2,650	59.50%
1916	3,335	67.72%	1,481	30.07%	109	2.21%
1920	6,646	83.97%	1,076	13.59%	193	2.44%
1924	4,714	59.51%	634	8.00%	2,573	32.48%
1928	5,731	70.32%	2,373	29.12%	46	0.56%
1932	3,523	38.10%	5,022	54.32%	701	7.58%
1936	4,306	43.35%	5,429	54.66%	198	1.99%
1940	5,692	54.26%	4,764	45.41%	35	0.33%
1944	5,059	55.63%	3,975	43.71%	60	0.66%
1948	4,553	51.42%	4,023	45.44%	278	3.14%
1952	7,880	70.79%	3,205	28.79%	47	0.42%
1956	6,642	63.67%	3,775	36.19%	15	0.14%
1960	6,438	62.32%	3,888	37.64%	4	0.04%
1964	3,828	41.14%	5,459	58.67%	17	0.18%
1968	5,308	58.11%	3,227	35.33%	599	6.56%
1972	5,869	61.42%	3,516	36.79%	171	1.79%
1976	4,682	50.19%	4,479	48.02%	167	1.79%
1980	5,329	53.72%	3,757	37.87%	834	8.41%
1984	5,195	53.38%	4,477	46.00%	60	0.62%
1988	3,856	42.84%	5,088	56.53%	57	0.63%
1992	3,590	39.98%	3,792	42.23%	1,597	17.79%
1996	3,505	42.11%	4,053	48.69%	766	9.20%
2000	4,486	53.18%	3,734	44.27%	215	2.55%
2004	4,875	54.48%	4,015	44.87%	59	0.66%
2008	4,315	48.70%	4,393	49.58%	153	1.73%
2012	4,670	52.48%	4,075	45.80%	153	1.72%
2016	5,254	61.57%	2,787	32.66%	492	5.77%
2020	5,850	65.08%	2,976	33.11%	163	1.81%
2024	5,790	68.44%	2,553	30.18%	117	1.38%

== See also ==
- Homer D. Calkins
- Ellsworth Community College
- Folkert Mound Group
- National Register of Historic Places listings in Hardin County, Iowa
- Hardin County Courthouse
