= Ellsworth Township =

Ellsworth Township may refer to the following places in the United States:

- Ellsworth Township, Logan County, Arkansas
- Ellsworth Township, Emmet County, Iowa
- Ellsworth Township, Hamilton County, Iowa, Hamilton County
- Ellsworth Township, Ellsworth County, Kansas
- Ellsworth Township, Michigan
- Ellsworth Township, Meeker County, Minnesota
- Ellsworth Township, Antelope County, Nebraska
- Ellsworth Township, Ohio

See also

- Ellsworth (disambiguation)
