= Ellsworth =

Ellsworth may refer to:

== People ==
- Ellsworth (surname)
- Ellsworth P. Bertholf (1866–1921), U.S. Coast Guard commodore
- Ellsworth B. Buck (1892–1970), American politician
- Ellsworth Bunker (1894–1984), American diplomat
- Ellsworth Burnett (1836–1895), American politician
- Ellsworth Cunningham (1865–1952), also known as Bert, American baseball player
- Ellsworth Foote (1898–1977), American politician
- Ellsworth "Bumpy" Johnson (1905–1968), American criminal
- Ellsworth Johnson (1923–2023), U.S. Army veteran
- Ellsworth Kelly (1923–2015), American artist
- Ellsworth Vines (1911–1994), American tennis player
- Elmer Ellsworth Adams (1861–1950), American businessman, newspaper editor, and politician
- Elmer E. Ellsworth (1837–1861), first Union casualty in the American Civil War

== Places ==
=== Antarctica ===
Named after Lincoln Ellsworth

- Ellsworth Land, a portion of the Antarctic continent bounded on the west by Marie Byrd Land and on the north by Bellingshausen Sea
- Ellsworth Mountains, the highest range of Antarctica
- Ellsworth Station, a research station
- Mount Ellsworth (Antarctica), highest peak of Queen Maud Mountains
- Lake Ellsworth (Antarctica), a subglacial lake

=== United States ===
- Ellsworth, Connecticut, an unincorporated community in the town of Sharon
- Ellsworth, Illinois, a village
- Ellsworth, Indiana, in Dubois County
- Ellsworth, Indiana, now known as North Terre Haute, Indiana
- Ellsworth, Iowa, a city
- Ellsworth County, Kansas
  - Ellsworth, Kansas, a city within the county
- Ellsworth, Maine, a city
- Ellsworth, Michigan, a village
- Ellsworth Township, Michigan, a civil township
- Ellsworth, Minnesota, a city
- Ellsworth Township, Meeker County, Minnesota, a township
- Ellsworth, Missouri, an unincorporated community
- Ellsworth, Nebraska, an unincorporated community
- Ellsworth, New Hampshire, a town
- Ellsworth, Ohio, an unincorporated community
- Ellsworth, Pennsylvania, a borough
- Ellsworth Air Force Base, a military base in Rapid City, South Dakota
- Ellsworth (town), Wisconsin, a town
  - Ellsworth, Wisconsin, a village within the town of the same name

== Companies ==
- Ellsworth Handcrafted Bicycles Inc., a high end US bicycle manufacturer.

== Other ==
- Ellsworth (character), a cartoon character of the Walt Disney Company
- Ellsworth Avenue, a major thoroughfare in the Shadyside neighborhood of Pittsburgh, Pennsylvania
- Ellsworth Community College, a US college in Iowa Falls, Iowa
- Ellsworth Toohey, a character in Ayn Rand's novel The Fountainhead
- "Ellsworth", a 2006 song by Rascal Flatts from their album Me and My Gang

== See also ==
- Justice Ellsworth (disambiguation)
- Lake Ellsworth (disambiguation)
