= Tornadoes of 2005 =

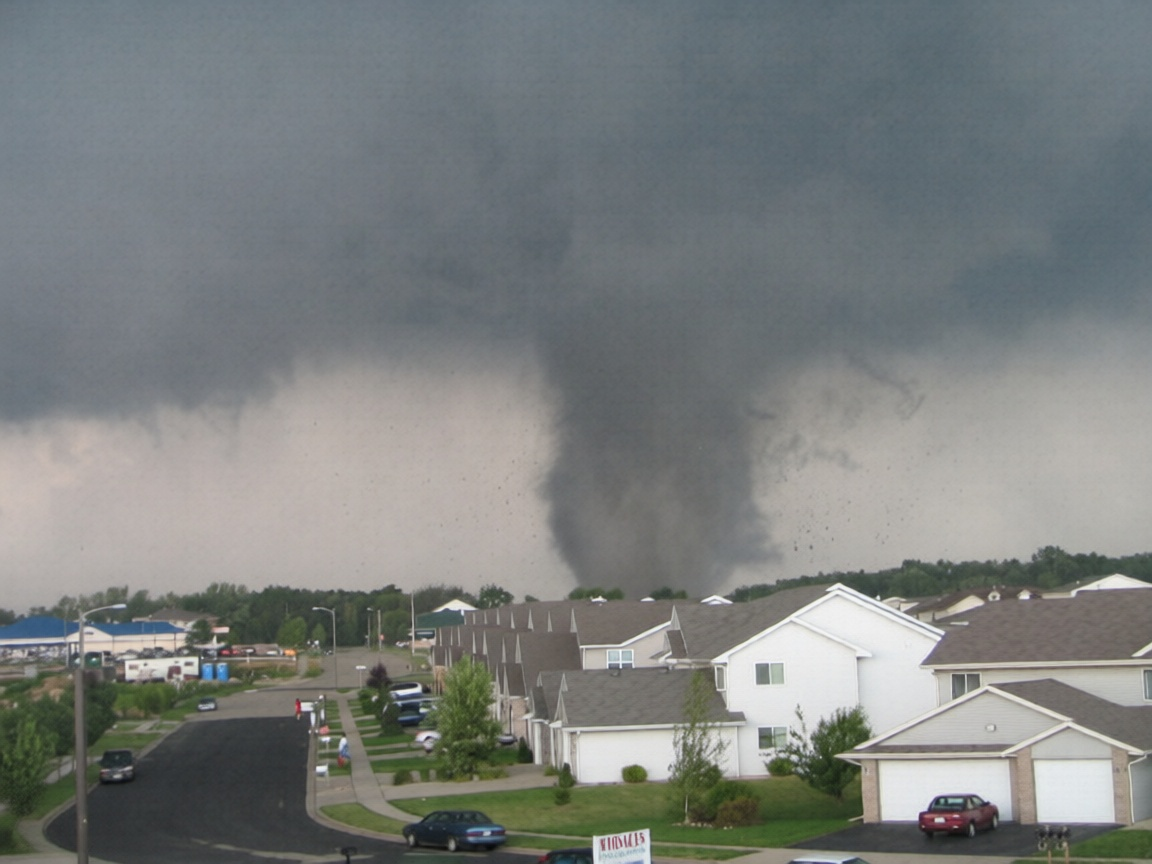
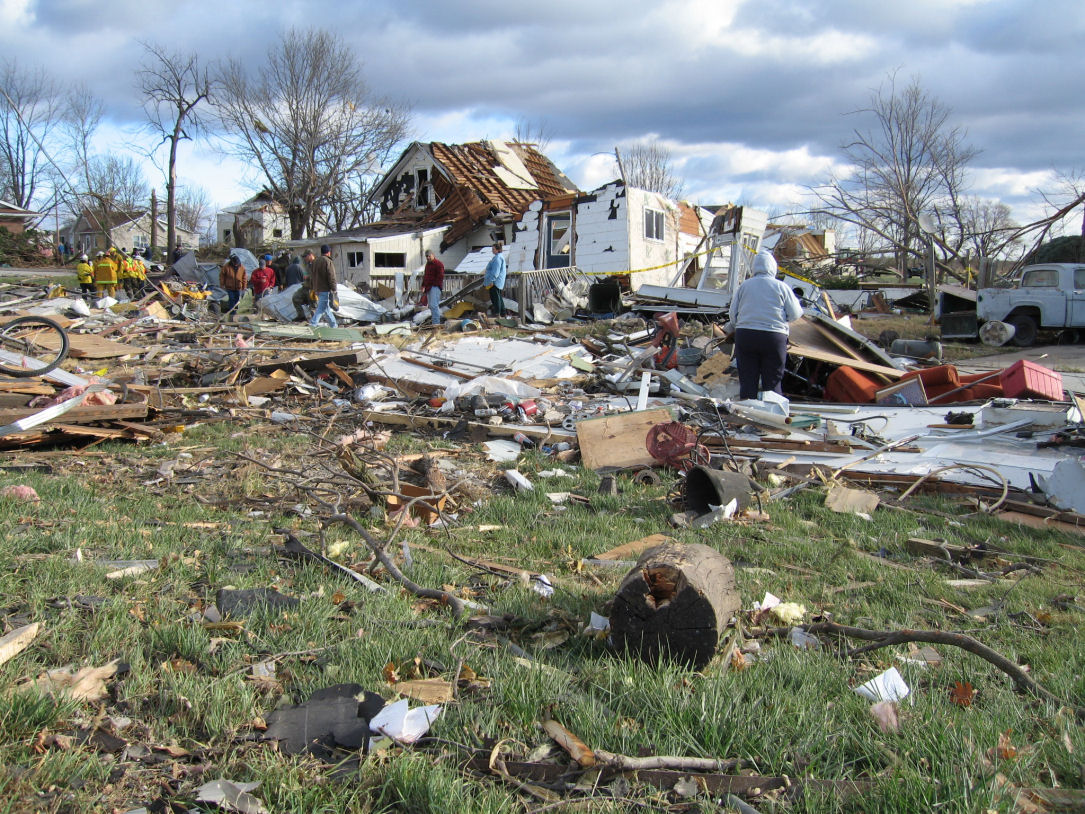
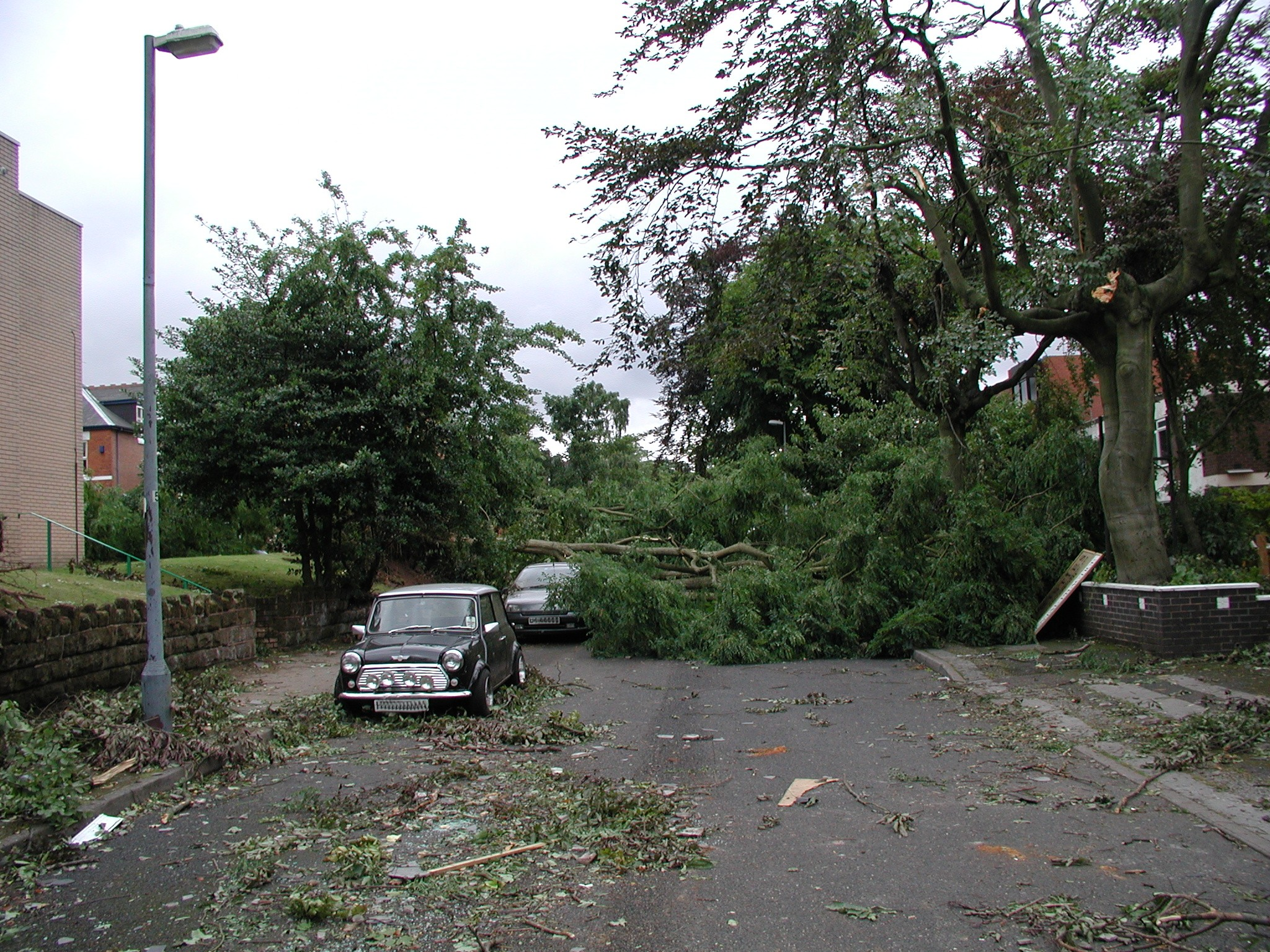
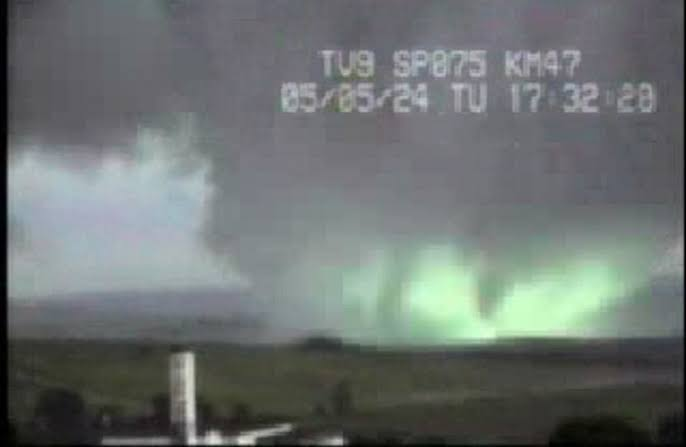
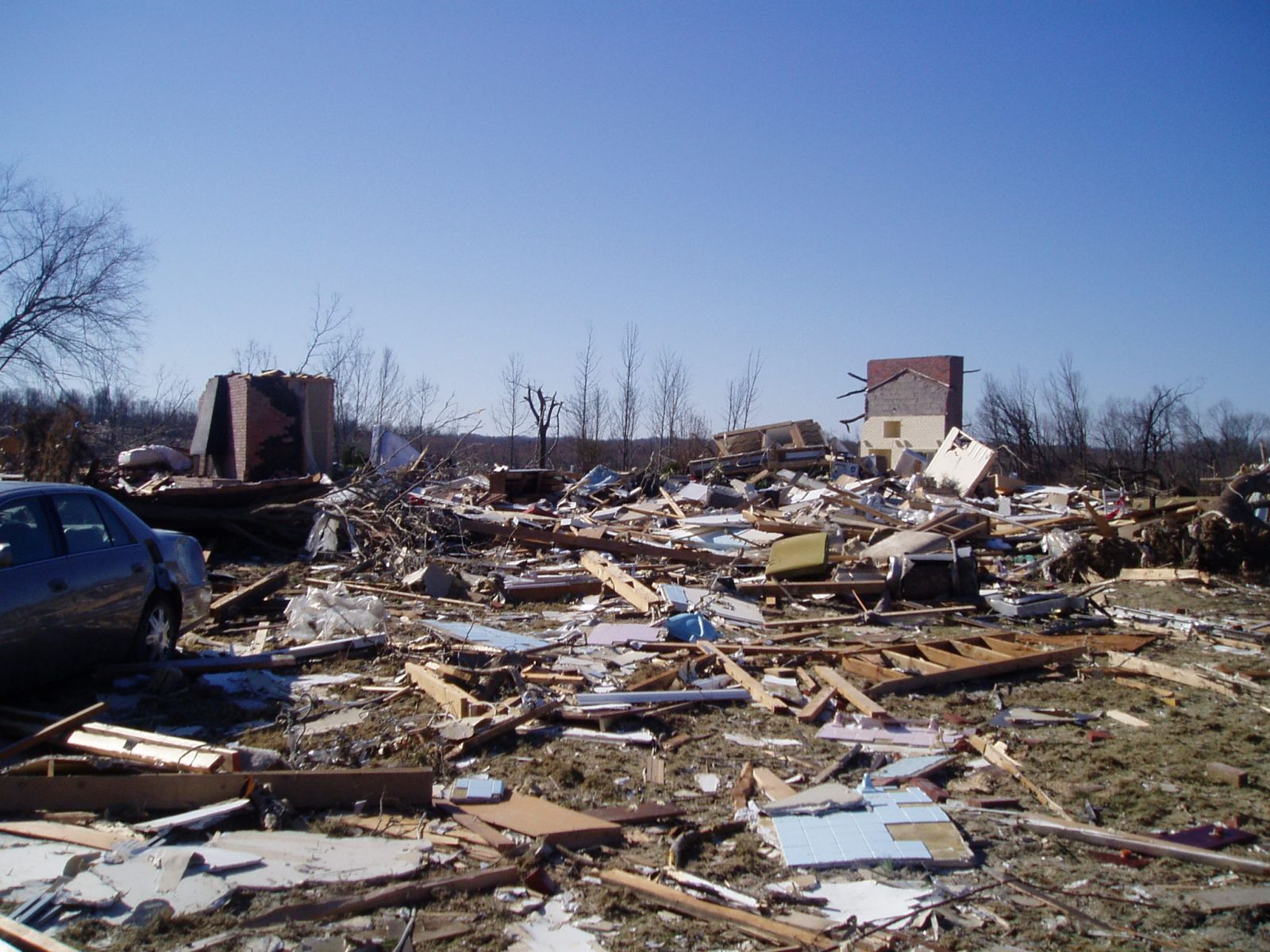
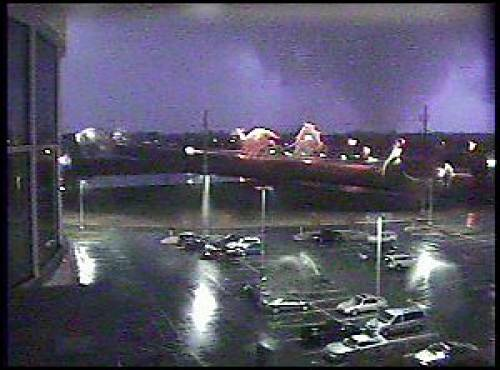
- Clockwise from top: An F3 tornado in Stoughton, Wisconsin on August 18; Downed trees after an IF3 tornado in Moseley, England on July 28; A leveled home in Hopkins County, Kentucky after an F4 tornado on November 15; An F3 tornado seen in Newburgh, Indiana on November 6; An F3 Tornado in Indaiatuba, Brazil; A destroyed home in Woodward, Iowa after an F2 tornado on November 12.
- Timespan: January 7 – December 28, 2005
- Maximum rated tornado: F4 tornado: Muitos Capões, Rio Grande do Sul on August 29; Madisonville, Kentucky on November 15
- Tornadoes in U.S.: 1,265
- Damage (U.S.): $229.8 million
- Fatalities (U.S.): 38
- Fatalities (worldwide): >171

This page documents notable tornadoes and tornado outbreaks worldwide in 2005. Strong and destructive tornadoes form most frequently in the United States, Bangladesh, Argentina, Brazil and Eastern India, but they can occur almost anywhere under the right conditions. Tornadoes also develop occasionally in southern Canada during the Northern Hemisphere's summer and somewhat regularly at other times of the year across Europe, Asia, and Australia. Tornadic events are often accompanied with other forms of severe weather, including strong thunderstorms, strong winds, and hail.

== Synopsis ==
The first half of 2005 was fairly slow when it comes to tornadoes. There were no major outbreaks in the first half of 2005, which is rather unusual. The inactivity in what is normally the peak months can be related to a stable low-pressure system that blocked the parade of storms from moving eastward.

The third quarter of 2005 was dominated by the tropics, and many of the tornadoes were related to the many hurricanes and tropical storms of the 2005 Atlantic hurricane season. Several of the tornadoes were destructive.

November was clearly the most active month for tornado activity in the US, with four significant - and completely separate - tornado events, as the wind pattern shifted and the warm tropical Gulf of Mexico added fuel to the fire when cold fronts passed southward, initiating the development of tornado outbreaks. One of the outbreaks produced an F4 tornado in Kentucky, marking the latest time for the first violent (F4 or F5) tornado to be recorded in the United States since modern records began in 1950. The record was broken in 2018, which saw no violent tornadoes touch down in the United States. December was much quieter as colder Arctic air became entrenched and the cold fronts became far less active.

There were officially 1,265 tornadoes confirmed in the US in 2005.

== Events ==
=== United States yearly total ===
Confirmed tornadoes by Fujita rating
FU	F0	F1	F2	F3	F4	F5	Total
0	815	344	85	20	1	0	1,265

Fatal United States tornadoes in 2005
- Approximate touchdown location of killer tornadoes in 2005
Summary of tornadoes
- January 12 – Arkansas (2 deaths)
- January 13 – Georgia (2 deaths)
- March 22 – Georgia (1 death)
- August 12 – Wyoming (2 deaths)
- August 18 – Wisconsin (1 death)
- August 29 – Georgia (1 death)
- September 24 – Mississippi (1 death)
- November 6 – Kentucky, Indiana (24 deaths)
- November 12 – Iowa (1 death)
- November 15 – Kentucky (1 death)
- November 27 – Arkansas (1 death)
- November 27 – Missouri (1 death)
Total fatalities: 38

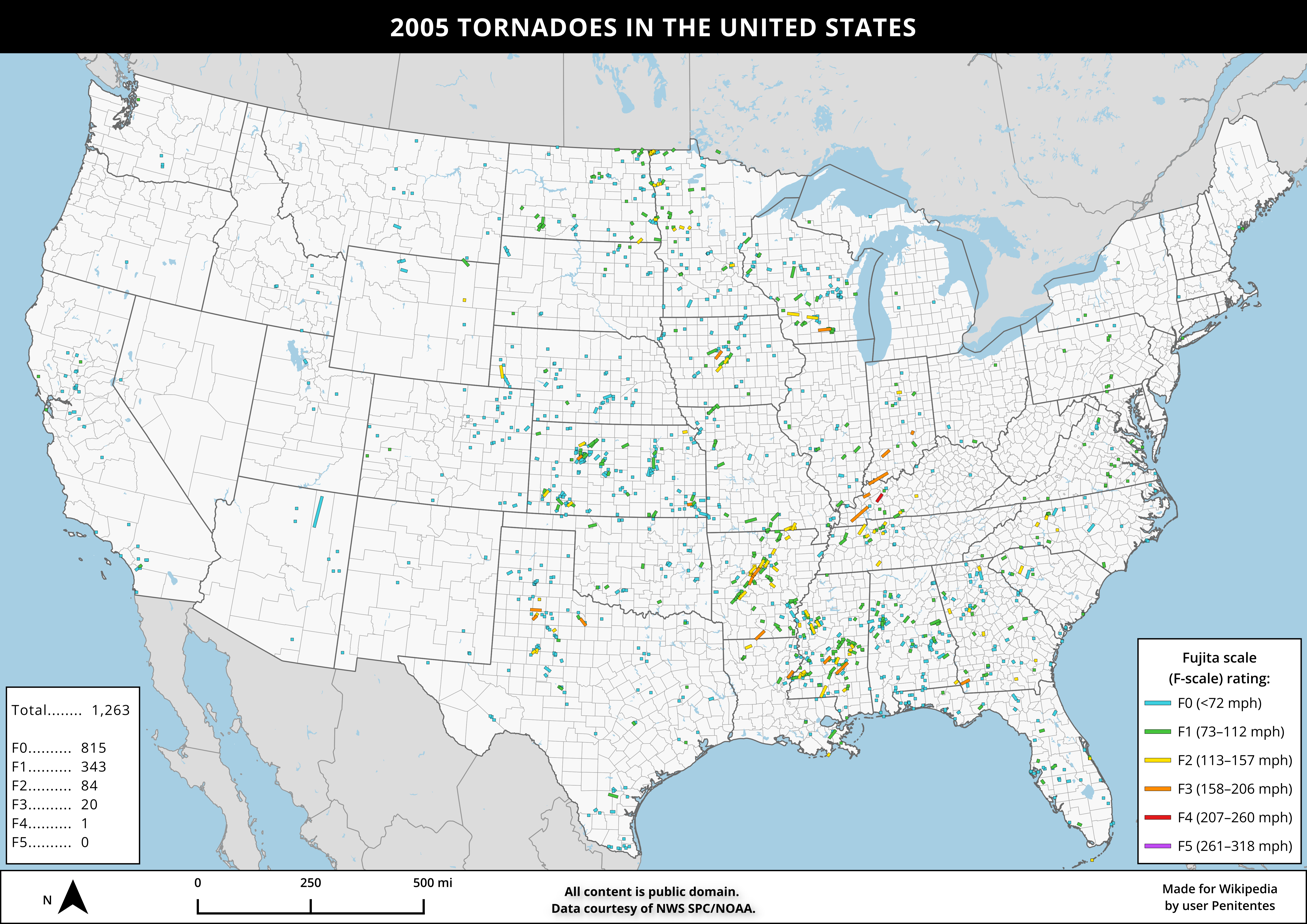
A map of 2005 United States tornado paths from the results of storm surveys.

== January ==
There were 33 tornadoes confirmed in the US in January.

=== January 3 (Brazil) ===
FU	F0	F1	F2	F3	F4	F5
0	0	2	0	0	0	0

Criciúma, Santa Catarina, was hit by two F1 tornadoes. Tornadoes struck two streets of the Great Santa Luzia, completely destroying houses and knocking down trees and walls. Small fires, originated from short circuits, also affected the city.

=== January 7 ===
FU	F0	F1	F2	F3	F4	F5
0	2	3	1	0	0	0

Six tornadoes touched down; five in Mississippi and one in Alabama. A F2 tornado tracked 3 miles southeast of Pine Ridge, Mississippi. There were no fatalities and injuries from the outbreak.

=== January 8–11 ===
FU	F0	F1	F2	F3	F4	F5
0	4	1	0	0	0	0

An unusual series of tornadoes struck California. Four tornadoes touched in the state over four days, including a F1 tornado southeast of Eggeville, California on January 8. In addition to the California tornadoes, a 10 yd wide waterspout moved onshore between Waimea and Pakala Village, Hawaii, producing F0 damage along a 5-mile path on January 9. No deaths or injuries occurred.

=== January 12–14 ===
FU	F0	F1	F2	F3	F4	F5
0	10	7	3	1	0	0

An outbreak of 21 tornadoes occurred over a three-day period from the 12th to the 14th. On the night of the 12th, a 250-yard wide F2 tornado traveled 15 miles in Claiborne Parish, Louisiana from southwest of Homer to west of Arizona, injuring 12. An even stronger 900-yard wide F3 tornado tracked 24 miles through Union County, Arkansas, striking the town of Lawson. Two people were killed and 13 were injured. On the 13th, an F1 tornado touched down near Arlington, Georgia and carried a small double wide trailer 35 feet before it impacted the ground and disintegrated. Of the five people inside, two were killed and three were injured. Two others were also injured by this tornado. In South Carolina, an F2 tornado struck Laurens, where homes, businesses, and a factory were damaged. A mobile home was destroyed and one person was injured. On the 14th, an F2 tornado near Rockwell, North Carolina snapped trees, flattened a barn, and heavily damaged two metal industrial buildings. Overall, the outbreak killed four people and injured 31.

=== January 28 (Africa) ===
A storm produced strong winds, severe hail, and an F1 tornado in the southern Manzini and Shiselweni regions of Swaziland. 30 people were killed, though it is unknown how many of these deaths are directly attributable to the tornado.

== February ==
There were 10 tornadoes confirmed in the US in February.

=== February 19–26 ===
FU	F0	F1	F2	F3	F4	F5
0	8	1	0	0	0	0

A collection of nine tornadoes struck California on four out of the eight days from Mid to Late–February. The strongest tornado was an 25 yard wide F1 tornado that tracked 2.8 miles into Temecula, California on February 19. Two F0 tornadoes also struck near Sacramento, California on February 21; one in West Sacramento and the other north of Gardenland in community of Northgate. There were no fatalities or injuries.

== March ==
There were 62 tornadoes confirmed in the US in March.

=== March 21–22 ===
FU	F0	F1	F2	F3	F4	F5
0	18	5	2	1	0	0

A two-day tornado outbreak took place in late March. The outbreak began on the 21st, producing 14 F0 tornadoes and one F1 tornado across Oklahoma, Texas, and Kansas. The tornado activity on the following day was more significant. The Storm Prediction Center's (SPC) Day 1 Outlook at 8 am EST, Tuesday morning, March 22 showed a slight risk for severe weather across much of the Southeast U.S. A moderate risk covered northern Mississippi, most of Alabama, and southwest Georgia. The atmosphere was very favorable for tornadic supercells with a warm front north of Tallahassee, Florida in southern Georgia and a center of low pressure back in eastern Oklahoma with a trailing cold front extending down through Louisiana into the Gulf of Mexico. A high-end F2 passed southeast of Ardilla, Alabama near Gordon, Alabama, destroying two homes and three barns. Numerous trees and power lines were downed, and several mobile homes were damaged as well. Four people were injured and transported to a hospital. Another tornado touched down in Seminole County, Georgia west-northwest of Donalsonville and moved northeast, destroying seven mobile homes and damaging 17 others. Many trees and power lines were downed, and a woman was killed when the tornado demolished her mobile home. The tornado continued into Miller County, where it reached F3 intensity before dissipating north of Boykin. The tornado damaged nearly 100 homes and destroyed 25 others along its path, and downed numerous trees and power lines. The tornado also destroyed several storage buildings, a welding shop, a farrowing house, and an implement shed. Several irrigation pivots were damaged or destroyed as well. Aside from the fatality, the tornado injured 18 people, two critically. Later that evening, an F2 tornado struck the town of Screven, Georgia, where 56 homes, 12 businesses, two public buildings, and a church were damaged or destroyed. Despite the severity of the damage, no injuries or fatalities occurred in Screven. Two weak tornadoes (rated F1 and F0) also struck the Memphis suburb of Olive Branch, Mississippi, resulting in moderate damage and one injury. Overall, the outbreak resulted in 26 tornadoes, one fatality, and 23 injuries.

=== March 25–26 ===
FU	F0	F1	F2	F3	F4	F5
0	2	7	0	0	0	0

A large storm system inside a very moist and unstable airmass produced nine weak tornadoes in Texas, Mississippi, and Louisiana. No fatalities or injuries occurred.

== April ==
There were 132 tornadoes confirmed in the US in April.

=== April 5–7 ===
FU	F0	F1	F2	F3	F4	F5
0	16	18	3	2	0	0

A three-day tornado outbreak occurred in early April. The outbreak began on the 5th, producing 10 F0 tornadoes and five F1 tornadoes across Kansas, Oklahoma, and Louisiana. One person was injured by an F1 tornado in Bienville Parish, Louisiana. On the 6th, a significant outbreak of 23 tornadoes occurred in the Southern United States. Mississippi sustained the most severe impacts as they were hit by four of the five significant tornadoes from the outbreak. A large F3 tornado in Rankin County, Mississippi destroyed or significantly damaged nearly three dozen homes and a dozen mobile homes, causing six injuries. The tornado also damaged the new Brandon High School, which was under construction, in Brandon and demolished several construction trailers as well. An F2 tornado passed east of Barto and destroyed a church and a couple of mobile homes, damaged a number of houses and businesses, knocked down numerous trees, and injured two people. Further south, another F3 tornado struck the town Mize. The top floor of the Attendance Center in Mize was almost completely taken off, and three portable classrooms were destroyed along with several large light poles bent or snapped. The tornado continued northeastward toward Mineral Springs. The damage between Mize and Mineral Springs, ranged between F2 and F3. Along Providence Road, a barn was destroyed, and two homes were significantly damaged, along with a church. The tornado then crossed MS 37, where many more trees were uprooted, along with several structures demolished or sustaining significant damage. The tornado then weakened and dissipated near Louin, after injuring eight people. Later that evening, a multiple-vortex F2 tornado developed off the Louisiana coast and moved ashore, striking Port Fourchon. The tornado caused damage to approximately 12 structures, including several port buildings and three businesses. A few buildings sustained significant damage. Two people suffered minor injuries. Several hundred vehicles were damaged either by flying debris or having their windows blown out. Approximately one mile of power lines were downed along LA 3090. Only one tornado touched down on the final day of the outbreak; a 1000 yard wide F1 tornado in Florida that caused moderate damage along an eight-mile path from the Ocala International Airport to the south side Ocala, injuring three people. Overall, the outbreak produced 39 tornadoes and resulted in 14 injuries but no fatalities.

=== April 8 ===
FU	F0	F1	F2	F3	F4	F5
0	5	0	0	0	0	0

Five F0 tornadoes touched down along the Interstate 5 and SR 99 corridors in Central California. This included a tornado in the Sacramento suburbs. It struck near the community of Rio Linda, which is north of Sacramento. No deaths or injuries were reported.

== May ==
There were 122 tornadoes were confirmed in the US in May.

=== May 12–13 ===
FU	F0	F1	F2	F3	F4	F5
0	10	1	2	2	0	0

A small outbreak of 15 tornadoes occurred in Texas. While the majority of the tornadoes were rated F0, four of them were significant. On the 12th, a 1000 yard wide F2 tornado struck the town of South Plains, destroying vehicles and power poles. Two strong tornadoes, rated F3 and F2, struck areas near the town of Ralls about 2.5 hours later, causing almost $800,000 in damage. The next day, another 1000 yard wide F3 touched down west of Vera, Texas and tracked 16.3 miles to just east of Goree. Although the tornado missed Goree, strong winds of up to 70 mph knocked down trees and power lines in the town. No fatalities or injuries occurred.

=== May 24 (Brazil) ===
An intense F3 multi-vortex tornado struck the southeastern part of Indaiatuba, São Paulo on May 24, 2005. The tornado caused industrial damage estimated at R$97.2 million (BRL), which led the government to declare a state of public calamity. This was the first multi-vortex tornado to be recorded through images in the Southern Hemisphere. Another unrated (but destructive) tornado struck the municipality of Itatiba, causing 1 death.

== June ==
There were 317 tornadoes confirmed in the US in June.

=== June 9–13 ===
FU	F0	F1	F2	F3	F4	F5
0	82	18	3	2	0	0

A four-day tornado outbreak struck a large portion of the U.S. The outbreak started on the 9th, when 37 tornadoes touched down across five states, with 25 of them in Kansas. Two F3 tornadoes touched down; the first was in Trego County, Kansas and the other in Petersburg/Allmon, Texas. June 10 saw 13 F0 tornadoes touch down across four states while June 11 produced 24 additional weak tornadoes across five states. On June 12, 14 more tornadoes touched down across four states with 11 of them being in Texas. All the tornadoes were weak except for a 1200 yard wide F2 that tracked 2 miles in an unusual southwestward direction in Kent County, Texas. 17 more weak tornadoes touched down across six states before the outbreak ended. Overall, 105 tornadoes touched down, although there were no fatalities or injuries.

=== June 12 (Country of Georgia) ===
FU	F0	F1	F2	F3	F4	F5
0	0	0	2	0	0	0

Two F2 tornadoes struck the country of Georgia, impacting the eastern and southern regions of the country. The two tornadoes struck the villages of Gorelovka and Mughanlo. Roofs were torn off homes and power lines were downed. 12 people were injured by the Mughanlo tornado. Heavy rain also accompanied the tornadoes.

== July ==
There were 138 tornadoes confirmed in the US in July, many of which were attributed to the hyperactive 2005 Atlantic Hurricane Season.

=== July 4 (Philippines) ===
A tornado struck the University of the Philippines Diliman in Quezon City at around 16:45 PhST. It lasted for 10 minutes as it uprooted structures and vehicles in its path where it resulted in damages up to ₱50,000. Some people sustained minor injuries as they stumbled while running away to safety.

=== July 6–8 (Hurricane Cindy) ===
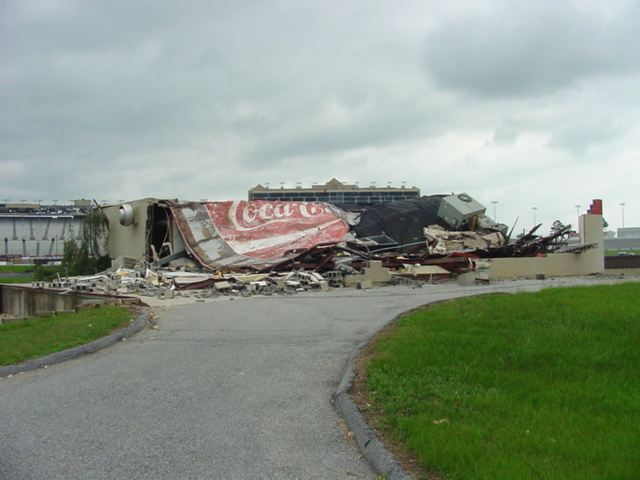
Collapsed building at the Atlanta Motor Speedway as a result of a tornado spawned by Cindy.

FU	F0	F1	F2	F3	F4	F5
0	32	17	3	0	0	0

Hurricane Cindy spawned 48 tornadoes in the Southeast. On July 6, one person was injured by an F1 tornado near Woodland, Alabama, the only casualty from the outbreak. An F2 tornado also struck the Atlanta Motor Speedway in Hampton, Georgia.

=== July 9–14 (Hurricane Dennis) ===
FU	F0	F1	F2	F3	F4	F5
0	14	3	0	0	0	0

Hurricane Dennis spawned 17 weak tornadoes in the Southeast. There were no fatalities or injures. There were also no tornadoes on July 12.

=== July 20 (Hurricane Emily) ===
FU	F0	F1	F2	F3	F4	F5
0	10	1	0	0	0	0

Hurricane Emily spawned 11 weak tornadoes in Texas. There were no fatalities or injuries.

=== July 28 (U.K.) ===
A small tornado outbreak occurred in England, including a strong tornado which struck Birmingham, England, injuring 39 people. It uprooted an estimated 1000 trees, seriously damaged buildings, threw cars, and caused other significant damage. The total cost of damage at the time was £40 million, making it the most costly tornado in British history. Maximum damage from the tornado was rated IF3 on the International Fujita scale, making it the strongest tornado recorded in the United Kingdom in nearly 30 years at that time.

Confirmed tornadoes by Fujita rating
FU	F0	F1	F2	F3	F4	F5	Total
1	2	0	0	1	0	0	4

== August ==
There were 123 tornadoes confirmed in the US in August.

=== August 11–13 ===
FU	F0	F1	F2	F3	F4	F5
0	7	4	1	0	0	0

12 tornadoes struck various areas of the United States over a three-day period. On August 12, an F2 tornado southeast of Wright, Wyoming killed two and injured 13. These were the only casualties from this period.

=== August 18 ===
FU	F0	F1	F2	F3	F4	F5
0	11	14	2	1	0	0

An outbreak of 28 tornadoes touched down (27 in Wisconsin and one in Minnesota). The worst event was an F3 tornado that struck Stoughton, Wisconsin. 23 of 27 injuries and the only fatality of the outbreak came from this tornado.

=== August 19 ===
FU	F0	F1	F2	F3	F4	F5
0	2	0	1	0	0	0

A series of thunderstorms on the afternoon of August 19 spawned three tornadoes, damaging homes in the Conestoga Lake and Fergus areas in Southern Ontario, Canada. The storms morphed into heavy rain cells when reaching Toronto. The Insurance Bureau of Canada has estimated that insured losses where the highest in the province's history, exceeding $500 million canadian dollars, two and a half times Ontario's losses during 1998 ice storm and the second largest loss event in Canadian history.

=== August 28 ===
FU	F0	F1	F2	F3	F4	F5
0	10	2	0	0	0	0

10 tornadoes struck various areas of Florida over a period. On August 28 2 F1 tornadoes hit Finland killed.

=== August 29 (Brazil) ===
An F4 tornado struck Muitos Capões, Rio Grande do Sul at around 21:30 BRT destroying 83 houses, including masonry and mixed construction (masonry + wood) homes. 70% of the town was affected and 15 people were injured. Masonry houses were either damaged or destroyed, with some only the bathroom left standing, mixed construction houses were destroyed or completely swept away, also a two-story masonry building had its upper floor completely destroyed. A Volkswagen Typ 1 vehicle was thrown 30 m (33 yd) away and was completely mangled. This tornado was previously rated high-end F3 by Marcelino in 2007, however, new imagery supported a rating upgrade from PREVOTS. This tornado is also compatible with an EF4 rating on the Enhanced Fujita scale, according to some damages compared with Damage Indicators present on the Enhanced Fujita scale.

=== August 26–31 (Hurricane Katrina) ===
FU	F0	F1	F2	F3	F4	F5
0	30	23	6	0	0	0

As Hurricane Katrina devastated the Gulf Coast, it spawned an outbreak of 57 tornadoes throughout the Mississippi Valley. The worst tornado occurred on August 29 near Star Point, Georgia, where a 200 yard wide F2 tracked 5.5 miles, killing one and injuring three. Overall, the outbreak caused one death and nine injuries.

== September ==
There were 133 tornadoes confirmed in the US in September.

=== September 24–26 (Hurricane Rita) ===
FU	F0	F1	F2	F3	F4	F5
0	53	33	11	1	0	0

A deadly outbreak generated by Hurricane Rita spawned 98 tornadoes, with 49 of them occurring in Mississippi alone. The one killer tornado of the outbreak was an F1 storm near Isola, Mississippi that killed one and injured two. The strongest tornado was an F3 storm that touched down in Clayton, Louisiana and passed near Troy, injuring three. Both of the tornadoes occurred on August 24. Overall, the outbreak killed one person and injured 23 others.

== October ==
There were 18 tornadoes confirmed in the US in October.

=== October 23–24 (Hurricane Wilma) ===
FU	F0	F1	F2	F3	F4	F5
0	5	2	1	0	0	0

Hurricane Wilma spawned eight tornadoes as it crossed South Florida. The strongest was an 40 yard wide F2 tornado that tracked 0.3 miles near the town of Palm Bay. There were no injuries or fatalities reported from the tornadoes.

== November ==
There were 149 tornadoes reported in the US in November.

=== November 5–6 ===
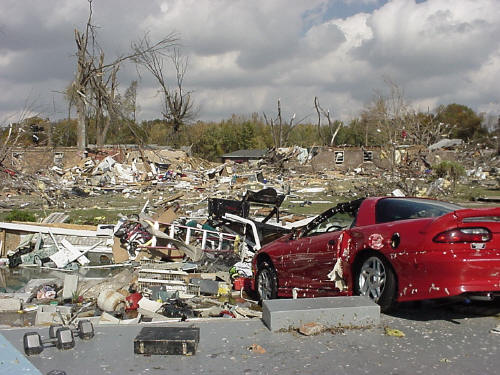
F3 tornado damage near Angel Mounds, Indiana

FU	F0	F1	F2	F3	F4	F5
0	1	2	4	2	0	0

A series of nine destructive nighttime tornadoes struck the Ohio Valley during the overnight hours from November 5 into the 6th. The worst tornado occurred early on November 6, when a 500 yard wide high-end F3 tornado tracked 41.3 miles across Northern Kentucky and Southern Indiana while also striking the city of Evansville, Indiana. All 24 fatalities and 238 of the 247 injuries from the outbreak came from this tornado alone.

=== November 12 ===
FU	F0	F1	F2	F3	F4	F5
0	5	6	2	1	0	0

An outbreak produced 14 tornadoes; 12 in Iowa and one each in Missouri and Arkansas. It was an unusual in that the outbreak was largest ever recorded in Iowa in November (only 23 tornadoes had been confirmed in Iowa in November since 1950), and among the largest outbreaks that far north and west in the United States that late in the year. The worst tornado of the outbreak was a 150 yard wide F3 tornado that tracked 17.6 miles across three Iowa counties while also striking the west side of Stratford, killing one and injuring three. An F2 tornado also caused considerable damage to homes on the northwestern fringes of Ames, heavily damaged a farm near Gilbert, and forced the evacuation of the Iowa State University stadium during a football game. One person was injured. Overall, the outbreak killed one and injured seven.

=== November 15 ===
FU	F0	F1	F2	F3	F4	F5
0	21	17	7	3	1	0

An intense outbreak struck areas from the Lower Mississippi Valley to the Lower Ohio Valley spawning 49 tornadoes. The one killer tornado of the outbreak was a long-tracked F3 tornado that tore a 44-mile path through Graves, Calloway, Marshall, and Lyon Counties in Kentucky while also striking the Southeastern Benton, killing one and injuring 20. The same cell dropped an even stronger F4 tornado, the only violent tornado of the year, further northeast in Hopkins County. This tornado moved directly through Earlington and Southeastern Madisonville, leveling several homes, reducing trees "to nubs", reportedly scouring the ground to bare soil and injuring 40 people. In all, the outbreak killed one and injured 108.

=== November 27–28 ===
FU	F0	F1	F2	F3	F4	F5
0	28	30	12	3	0	0

The final large tornado outbreak of the year struck on this two-day period in late-November. On November 27, a mini-supercell outbreak spawned 19 weak tornadoes in Kansas. This was quite unusual as the state had only had two November tornado days in the last 20 years. In Missouri, an F2 tornado struck Ripley County, killing one when a two-story house was destroyed. An F0 tornado also caused extensive damage when it struck the Western St. Louis suburb of Maplewood. The worst tornadoes occurred in Arkansas, where 38 tornadoes touched down. A long-tracked F3 tornado struck Interstate 40 one mile west of Plumerville, killing one and injuring seven. The same tornado also moved through Hill Creek, causing additional damage and another injury before dissipating just after passing through Springfield. The one death and eight of the 11 injuries that occurred in Arkansas came from this tornado alone. Eight weak tornadoes touched down in the Southeast on November 28 before the outbreak ended. In all, 73 tornadoes were confirmed along with the two fatalities and 15 injuries.

== December ==
There were 26 tornadoes confirmed in the US in December.

== See also ==
- Tornado
  - Tornadoes by year
  - Tornado records
  - Tornado climatology
  - Tornado myths
- List of tornado outbreaks
  - List of F5 and EF5 tornadoes
  - List of F4 and EF4 tornadoes
  - List of North American tornadoes and tornado outbreaks
  - List of 21st-century Canadian tornadoes and tornado outbreaks
  - List of European tornadoes and tornado outbreaks
  - List of tornadoes and tornado outbreaks in Asia
  - List of Southern Hemisphere tornadoes and tornado outbreaks
  - List of tornadoes striking downtown areas
  - List of tornadoes with confirmed satellite tornadoes
- Tornado intensity
  - Fujita scale
  - Enhanced Fujita scale
  - International Fujita scale
  - TORRO scale
