= Stratford Community School District =

School district in Iowa, United States

Coordinates: 42.273301°N 93.926743°W

Location
- Stratford, Iowa Hamilton, Webster and Boone counties United States
- Coordinates: 42.273301, -93.926743

District information
- Type: Local school district
- Grades: PK-6
- Superintendent: Matt Berininghaus
- Schools: 1
- Budget: $2,769,000 (2020-21)
- NCES District ID: 1927480

Students and staff
- Students: 80 (2022-23)
- Teachers: 8.28 FTE
- Staff: 15.30 FTE
- Student–teacher ratio: 9.66
- Colors: Orange and Black

Other information
- Website: www.stratford.k12.ia.us

The Stratford Community School District is a rural public school district headquartered in Stratford, Iowa. The district spans western Hamilton County and eastern Webster County, with a smaller area in Boone County, and serves the town of Stratford and the surrounding rural areas.

Matt Berninghaus, superintendent of Webster City Community School District, serves as superintendent.

== Schools ==
The district operates a single elementary school in Stratford:

- Stratford Elementary School

Students from Stratford attend secondary school at Webster City Community School District.
