= Anderson Goose Lake =

- Goose Lake; Anderson Lake
- Location within Iowa Location within the United States
- Location: Hamilton County, Iowa
- Coordinates: 42°18′56″N 93°37′26″W
- Type: glacial lake
- Basin countries: United States
- Surface elevation: 1,053 ft (321 m)

U.S. National Natural Landmark
- Designated: 1975

Anderson Goose Lake or Goose Lake or Anderson Lake are the names of a natural glacial lake located in Hamilton County, Iowa, close to Jewell Junction. It is an important waterfowl habitat. It is a National Natural Landmark designated in 1975.
