= Little Wall Lake =

Lake in Hamilton County, Iowa, USA

- Location of the lake in Iowa
- Location: Hamilton County, Iowa
- Coordinates: 42°16′12″N 93°38′15″W
- Surface area: 249 acres (101 ha)
- Max. depth: 13 ft (4.0 m)

Little Wall Lake is a 249 acres (101 ha) natural lake in Hamilton County, Iowa, 2 mi (3.2 km) south of the town of Jewell. Said to be glacial in origin, in modern times it has required dredging to keep it from becoming marshland. On the northern end of the lake is Little Wall Lake Park, run by the county, which has camping facilities with full utility hook-ups, three cabins for rent, sixteen tent-only sites, a shower building, a boat ramp, a jetty, and kayak and canoe rentals. Big Wall Lake lies some 23 mi (37 km) to the north and is not hydrologically connected to Little Wall Lake. On March 28, 2021, two members of the Iowa State University Crew Club drowned in the lake when their racing shell capsized.
