= 2005 Iowa tornado outbreak =

November tornado outbreak in Iowa, United States

- Debris accumulation from damaged homes in Stratford, Iowa, following a fatal F3 tornado that killed one on November 12

Meteorological history
- Duration: November 12, 2005

Tornado outbreak
- Tornadoes: 14
- Max. rating: F3 tornado
- Duration: 6 hours, 22 minutes

Overall effects
- Fatalities: 1
- Injuries: 7
- Damage: $18.607 million (2005 USD)
- Areas affected: Iowa (12 tornadoes; maximum rated: F3); Missouri (1 tornado; maximum rated: F1); Arkansas (1 tornado; maximum rated: F0)
- Part of the Tornadoes of 2005

A widespread and unusual late-autumn season tornado outbreak took place during the afternoon and evening hours of November 12, 2005. The majority of these tornadoes occurred in central Iowa, primarily surrounding the city of Ames in Story County. One person was killed and there was extensive damage in several communities.

There were preliminary reports of as many as twenty tornadoes in Iowa, and 14 were later confirmed; 12 of these being in Iowa, and two other tornadoes being recorded in Arkansas and Missouri, respectively. It is the largest tornado outbreak to take place in Iowa during November. In the month of November, only 23 confirmed tornadoes have been recorded in Iowa from 1950–2004. There were also numerous reports of large hail and strong straight-line winds, mainly in southeast South Dakota.

An F2 tornado clipped the northwestern portion of Ames, continuing towards Gilbert. This prompted officials to sound the city's tornado sirens just before an Iowa State University (ISU) Cyclones football game, resulting in an evacuation of the stadium. The tornado was visible from the stadium. A few months prior, on September 8, a tornado directly struck the ISU campus, causing minor damage.

== Confirmed tornadoes ==
Confirmed tornadoes by Fujita rating
FU	F0	F1	F2	F3	F4	F5	Total
0	5	6	2	1	0	0	14

F#	Location	County	State	Time (UTC)	Path length	Damage
F1	S of Scranton	Greene	IA	2150	1 mile (1.6 km)	Brief tornado caused little damage as it moved through fields.
F3	S of Boxholm to NE of Stratford	Boone, Webster, Hamilton	IA	2227	17.6 miles (28.3 km)	1 death – In Boone County, the tornado struck a farm at F1 intensity, damaging the home and some outbuildings. It also flipped over one pickup truck and killed two horses at this location. The tornado reached F2 intensity in Webster County, where a home was heavily damaged and a large outbuilding was destroyed. A machine shed was also destroyed, along with most of its contents. In Hamilton County, the tornado reached F3 intensity as it struck Stratford, where many homes were heavily damaged or destroyed and one person was killed. Vehicles were flipped and trees were snapped as well. A gas leak forced an evacuation of the town. Three farms were damaged outside of town before the tornado dissipated. Three people were injured.
F2	W of Minburn to E of Woodward	Dallas, Boone	IA	2228	12 miles (19 km)	Dozens of homes in Woodward were damaged or destroyed, including several homes shifted off their foundations. A double wide mobile home was flipped upside down into the middle of a street. One farm was also destroyed outside of town. Two people were injured.
F1	Hospers	Sioux	IA	2230	1 mile (1.6 km)	Tornado destroyed the wall and part of the roof of a business in Hospers, and caused minor damage to contents in the building.
F1	NW of Madrid	Boone	IA	2248	6 miles (9.7 km)	Heavy damage to one farm site and moderate damage to one home.
F0	Ames	Story	IA	2256	0.2 miles (0.32 km)	Anticyclonic tornado lifted lawn chairs and caused shingle damage to homes in Ames.
F2	W of Ames to NE of Gilbert	Boone, Story	IA	2258	12 miles (19 km)	Tornado caused considerable damage to homes on the northwestern fringes of Ames. Tornado was visible from Iowa State University and forced the evacuation of the stadium during a football game. A farm was also heavily damaged near Gilbert. One person was injured.
F0	SW of Story City	Story	IA	2315	1.6 miles (2.6 km)	Aerial surveys showed minor damage.
F1	W of Roland to N of Radcliffe	Story, Hamilton, Hardin	IA	2320	8 miles (13 km)	Several farm sites were damaged along the path.
F0	S of Williams	Hamilton	IA	2327	1.5 miles (2.4 km)	Brief touchdown. No damage was reported.
F0	N of Steamboat Rock	Hardin	IA	2350	0.7 miles (1.1 km)	Brief tornado with little damage.
F1	Blakesburg area	Monroe	IA	0040	1.5 miles (2.4 km)	Destroyed a barn along its short track.
F1	NE of Hoburg	Lawrence	MO	0140	5 miles (8.0 km)	Several homes suffered moderate to significant damage. Most damage was predominantly to roofs while several trees were uprooted. One woman was injured in her home.
F0	W of Mena	Polk	AR	0427	3.5 miles (5.6 km)	A couple of older chicken houses sustained structural damage. A number of trees were also snapped off along the path of the tornado.
Sources: NCDC database Des Moines office

== See also ==
- List of North American tornadoes and tornado outbreaks
- Iowa tornado outbreak of July 2018 - A more prolific outbreak across Iowa that also spawned EF3 tornadoes.
