= Homer, Iowa =

- Unincorporated community
- Homer General Store

- Location within Iowa
- Coordinates: 42°22′26″N 93°55′25″W
- Country: United States
- State: Iowa
- County: Hamilton
- Elevation: 1,168 ft (356 m)
- Time zone: UTC-6 (Central (CST))
  - Summer (DST): UTC-5 (CDT)
- Area code: 515
- GNIS feature ID: 464583

Homer was an unincorporated community in Webster Township, Hamilton County, Iowa, United States. Homer was located near the county's western border with Webster County, 8.6 miles (13.8 km) southwest of Webster City.

== History ==
The community was founded in 1853, before Hamilton County split from Webster County, and was Webster County's original county seat and home to its first post office. It was named for the Greek poet Homer. An annual threshing bee is held in Homer.

Gravel roads retain the historic names, Homer Main Street and Homer Second Street

The original Homer plat showed 42 blocks, with streets from the north of First, Second, Third, Fourth, Fifth, and Sixth. The south edge of the plat had no street, but today it is the blacktop south of Homer. The north–south streets were named Walnut, Water, Main, Washington, and Chestnut. At its peak, Homer had 600 residents. The post office closed in 1913. The only surviving buildings of note are the Methodist Church (which was moved roughly 5 miles east in 2023) and the old general store, which has been converted into a small engine shop. Most of the land in Homer has reverted to farmland. Homer's population was 33 in 1902, and 79 in 1925. The population was 30 in 1940.
