= Hamilton County Courthouse =

Hamilton County Courthouse may refer to:

- Hamilton County Courthouse (Illinois), McLeansboro, Illinois
- Hamilton County Courthouse (Indiana), Noblesville, Indiana
- Hamilton County Courthouse (Iowa), Webster City, Iowa
- Hamilton County Courthouse (Kansas), Syracuse, Kansas
- Hamilton County Courthouse (Nebraska), Aurora, Nebraska
- Hamilton County Courthouse Complex, Lake Pleasant, New York
- Hamilton County Courthouse (Ohio), Cincinnati, Ohio
- Hamilton County Courthouse (Tennessee), Chattanooga, Tennessee
- Hamilton County Courthouse (Texas), Hamilton, Texas
