= South Hamilton Community School District =

Public school district in Jewell, Iowa, United States

Coordinates: 42.302430°N 93.646114°W

Location
- Jewell, Iowa Hamilton and Boone counties United States
- Coordinates: 42.302430, -93.646114

District information
- Type: Local school district
- Grades: K–12
- Established: 1962
- Superintendent: Heather Holm
- Schools: 2
- Budget: $11,532,000 (2020-21)
- NCES District ID: 1926640

Students and staff
- Students: 690 (2022-23)
- Teachers: 48.45 FTE
- Staff: 42.28 FTE
- Student–teacher ratio: 14.24
- Athletic conference: Heart of Iowa
- District mascot: Hawks
- Colors: Maroon and white

Other information
- Website: shhawks.net

South Hamilton Community School District is a rural public school district headquartered in Jewell, Iowa. It includes an elementary school and a middle/high school.

The district is mostly in Hamilton County with a section in Boone County. It serves Jewell Junction, Ellsworth, Randall, and Stanhope.

== History ==
Circa 1998, there was a bond that would allow the district to change the grade configuration; at the time it had grades 5–12 in the secondary school building, originally intended only as a senior high school, while it hoped to have only grades 7–12 there, with students until grade 5 in the elementary school.

In 2006, there were parents in the Hubbard–Radcliffe Community School District who preferred to send their children to South Hamilton schools instead of the Eldora–New Providence district, which Hubbard–Radcliffe had a grade-sharing agreement with. Parents in the western portion of Hubbard–Radcliffe preferred the idea of that district grade-sharing with South Hamilton instead of Eldora–New Providence. Some parents preferring the South Hamilton district purchased a bus to transport their children there. Tom Barton of the WCF Courier wrote that "many" Hubbard–Radcliffe parents chose South Hamilton schools.

== Schools ==
The district operates two schools on a single campus in Jewell.

- South Hamilton Elementary School
- South Hamilton High School

=== South Hamilton High School ===
==== Athletics ====
The Hawks compete in the Heart of Iowa Conference in the following sports:

- Cross country
- Volleyball
- Football
- Basketball
  - Girls' 1965 state champions
- Wrestling
- Track and field
- Golf
- Baseball
  - 1962 state champions
- Softball
  - 3-time state champions (1964, 1965, 1974)

== Notable alumni ==
- Brian Thompson (1974–2024), Class of 1993 valedictorian, CEO of UnitedHealthCare (2021–2024)

== See also ==
- List of school districts in Iowa
- List of high schools in Iowa
