= Randall, Iowa =

- City
- Location of Randall, Iowa
- Coordinates: 42°14′13″N 93°36′09″W
- Country: USA
- State: Iowa
- County: Hamilton

Area
  - Total: 0.41 sq mi (1.05 km^{2})
  - Land: 0.41 sq mi (1.05 km^{2})
  - Water: 0 sq mi (0.00 km^{2})
- Elevation: 1,027 ft (313 m)

Population (2020)
  - Total: 154
  - Density: 379.8/sq mi (146.64/km^{2})
- Time zone: UTC-6 (Central (CST))
  - Summer (DST): UTC-5 (CDT)
- ZIP code: 50231
- Area code: 515
- FIPS code: 19-65595
- GNIS feature ID: 2396314

Randall is a city in Hamilton County, Iowa, United States. The population was 154 at the time of the 2020 census.

== History ==
A post office called Randall has been in operation since 1863. The city was named for Samuel J. Randall, a member of the House of Representatives from Pennsylvania.

== Geography ==
According to the United States Census Bureau, the city has a total area of 0.41 square miles (1.06 km^{2}), all land.

== Demographics ==
Historical populations
Year	Pop.	±%
1950	202	—
1960	201	−0.5%
1970	179	−10.9%
1980	171	−4.5%
1990	161	−5.8%
2000	148	−8.1%
2010	173	+16.9%
2020	154	−11.0%
Source:"U.S. Census website". United States Census Bureau. and Iowa Data Center; Source: U.S. Decennial Census

=== 2020 census ===
As of the census of 2020, there were 154 people, 67 households, and 42 families residing in the city. The population density was 379.8 inhabitants per square mile (146.6/km^{2}). There were 75 housing units at an average density of 185.0 per square mile (71.4/km^{2}). The racial makeup of the city was 98.7% White, 0.0% Black or African American, 0.0% Native American, 0.6% Asian, 0.0% Pacific Islander, 0.6% from other races and 0.0% from two or more races. Hispanic or Latino persons of any race comprised 1.3% of the population.

Of the 67 households, 28.4% of which had children under the age of 18 living with them, 59.7% were married couples living together, 7.5% were cohabitating couples, 10.4% had a female householder with no spouse or partner present and 22.4% had a male householder with no spouse or partner present. 37.3% of all households were non-families. 32.8% of all households were made up of individuals, 13.4% had someone living alone who was 65 years old or older.

The median age in the city was 43.6 years. 16.9% of the residents were under the age of 20; 5.2% were between the ages of 20 and 24; 29.2% were from 25 and 44; 27.9% were from 45 and 64; and 20.8% were 65 years of age or older. The gender makeup of the city was 50.6% male and 49.4% female.

=== 2010 census ===
As of the census of 2010, there were 173 people, 75 households, and 50 families living in the city. The population density was 422.0 inhabitants per square mile (162.9/km^{2}). There were 79 housing units at an average density of 192.7 per square mile (74.4/km^{2}). The racial makeup of the city was 99.4% White and 0.6% Asian.

There were 75 households, of which 28.0% had children under the age of 18 living with them, 62.7% were married couples living together, 4.0% had a female householder with no husband present, and 33.3% were non-families. 30.7% of all households were made up of individuals, and 9.4% had someone living alone who was 65 years of age or older. The average household size was 2.31 and the average family size was 2.92.

The median age in the city was 44.5 years. 22.5% of residents were under the age of 18; 4.1% were between the ages of 18 and 24; 24.3% were from 25 to 44; 32.9% were from 45 to 64; and 16.2% were 65 years of age or older. The gender makeup of the city was 52.0% male and 48.0% female.

=== 2000 census ===
As of the census of 2000, there were 148 people, 68 households, and 45 families living in the city. The population density was 321.8 inhabitants per square mile (124.2/km^{2}). There were 75 housing units at an average density of 163.1 per square mile (63.0/km^{2}). The racial makeup of the city was 100.00% White. Hispanic or Latino of any race were 1.35% of the population.

There were 68 households, out of which 27.9% had children under the age of 18 living with them, 55.9% were married couples living together, 8.8% had a female householder with no husband present, and 33.8% were non-families. 32.4% of all households were made up of individuals, and 13.2% had someone living alone who was 65 years of age or older. The average household size was 2.18 and the average family size was 2.76.

In the city, the population was spread out, with 24.3% under the age of 18, 7.4% from 18 to 24, 29.7% from 25 to 44, 25.0% from 45 to 64, and 13.5% who were 65 years of age or older. The median age was 38 years. For every 100 females, there were 100.0 males. For every 100 females age 18 and over, there were 86.7 males.

The median income for a household in the city was $30,750, and the median income for a family was $40,875. Males had a median income of $27,500 versus $22,500 for females. The per capita income for the city was $20,991. There were 4.4% of families and 6.4% of the population living below the poverty line, including no under eighteens and 16.7% of those over 64.

== Education ==
South Hamilton Community School District serves this community.
