= Fremont Township, Hamilton County, Iowa =

Township in Iowa, USA

Coordinates: 42°31′N 93°55′W

Fremont Township is a township in Hamilton County, Iowa, USA.
