= Stanhope, Iowa =

- City
- Motto: "A Slice of the Good Life"
- Location of Stanhope, Iowa
- Coordinates: 42°17′20″N 93°47′46″W
- Country: USA
- State: Iowa
- County: Hamilton

Area
  - Total: 0.98 sq mi (2.54 km^{2})
  - Land: 0.98 sq mi (2.54 km^{2})
  - Water: 0 sq mi (0.00 km^{2})
- Elevation: 1,119 ft (341 m)

Population (2020)
  - Total: 364
  - Density: 371.3/sq mi (143.37/km^{2})
- Time zone: UTC-6 (Central (CST))
  - Summer (DST): UTC-5 (CDT)
- ZIP code: 50246
- Area code: 515
- FIPS code: 19-74910
- GNIS feature ID: 2395950
- Website: Stanhope, Iowa Website

Stanhope is a city in Hamilton County, Iowa, United States. The population was 364 at the time of the 2020 census.

== History ==
Stanhope was laid out in 1883. It was named for Lady Hester Stanhope, a British traveler and author. Another theory for the origin of the name is that it was named after an official from the Chicago Northwestern Railroad. The city was incorporated on December 14, 1897.

== Geography ==
According to the United States Census Bureau, the city has a total area of 0.97 square miles (2.51 km^{2}), all land.

== Demographics ==
Historical populations
Year	Pop.	±%
1900	297	—
1910	281	−5.4%
1920	400	+42.3%
1930	425	+6.2%
1940	425	+0.0%
1950	420	−1.2%
1960	461	+9.8%
1970	482	+4.6%
1980	492	+2.1%
1990	447	−9.1%
2000	488	+9.2%
2010	422	−13.5%
2020	364	−13.7%
Source:"U.S. Census website". United States Census Bureau. and Iowa Data Center; Source: U.S. Decennial Census

=== 2020 census ===
As of the census of 2020, there were 364 people, 172 households, and 96 families residing in the city. The population density was 371.3 inhabitants per square mile (143.4/km^{2}). There were 192 housing units at an average density of 195.9 per square mile (75.6/km^{2}). The racial makeup of the city was 94.5% White, 0.8% Black or African American, 0.3% Native American, 0.0% Asian, 0.0% Pacific Islander, 0.5% from other races and 3.8% from two or more races. Hispanic or Latino persons of any race comprised 6.6% of the population.

Of the 172 households, 18.6% of which had children under the age of 18 living with them, 49.4% were married couples living together, 5.8% were cohabitating couples, 26.2% had a female householder with no spouse or partner present and 18.6% had a male householder with no spouse or partner present. 44.2% of all households were non-families. 37.8% of all households were made up of individuals, 12.8% had someone living alone who was 65 years old or older.

The median age in the city was 48.0 years. 20.9% of the residents were under the age of 20; 4.4% were between the ages of 20 and 24; 21.4% were from 25 and 44; 36.5% were from 45 and 64; and 16.8% were 65 years of age or older. The gender makeup of the city was 50.5% male and 49.5% female.

=== 2010 census ===
As of the census of 2010, there were 422 people, 192 households, and 117 families residing in the city. The population density was 435.1 inhabitants per square mile (168.0/km^{2}). There were 209 housing units at an average density of 215.5 per square mile (83.2/km^{2}). The racial makeup of the city was 96.4% White, 0.2% African American, 0.2% Native American, 0.2% Asian, 1.4% from other races, and 1.4% from two or more races. Hispanic or Latino of any race were 1.4% of the population.

There were 192 households, of which 23.4% had children under the age of 18 living with them, 47.9% were married couples living together, 8.3% had a female householder with no husband present, 4.7% had a male householder with no wife present, and 39.1% were non-families. 34.9% of all households were made up of individuals, and 15.6% had someone living alone who was 65 years of age or older. The average household size was 2.20 and the average family size was 2.81.

The median age in the city was 45.4 years. 17.3% of residents were under the age of 18; 8.9% were between the ages of 18 and 24; 22.9% were from 25 to 44; 30.1% were from 45 to 64; and 20.6% were 65 years of age or older. The gender makeup of the city was 50.2% male and 49.8% female.

=== 2000 census ===
As of the census of 2000, there were 488 people, 198 households, and 134 families residing in the city. The population density was 496.4 inhabitants per square mile (191.7/km^{2}). There were 207 housing units at an average density of 210.6 per square mile (81.3/km^{2}). The racial makeup of the city was 98.77% White, 0.61% from other races, and 0.61% from two or more races. Hispanic or Latino of any race were 1.02% of the population.

There were 198 households, out of which 30.8% had children under the age of 18 living with them, 58.6% were married couples living together, 6.6% had a female householder with no husband present, and 32.3% were non-families. 26.8% of all households were made up of individuals, and 17.2% had someone living alone who was 65 years of age or older. The average household size was 2.46 and the average family size was 3.00.

24.8% were under the age of 18, 5.5% from 18 to 24, 29.5% from 25 to 44, 19.3% from 45 to 64, and 20.9% were 65 years of age or older. The median age was 41 years. For every 100 females, there were 102.5 males. For every 100 females age 18 and over, there were 98.4 males.

The median income for a household in the city was $39,500, and the median income for a family was $41,667. Males had a median income of $29,107 versus $22,656 for females. The per capita income for the city was $18,592. About 5.1% of families and 6.1% of the population were below the poverty line, including 5.0% of those under age 18 and 8.3% of those age 65 or over.

== Arts and culture ==
Stanhope is known locally for its annual Watermelon Day celebration. Starting in 1958, the event is sponsored by the local Lions Club organization. The celebration includes a parade, slow pitch softball tournament, games and free watermelon.

== Education ==
South Hamilton Community School District serves this community.
