= Lincoln Township, Hamilton County, Iowa =

Township in Iowa, USA

Coordinates: 42°20′N 93°31′W

Lincoln Township is a township in Hamilton County, Iowa, USA.
