= Independence Township, Hamilton County, Iowa =

Township in Iowa, USA

Coordinates: 42°26′N 93°45′W

Independence Township is a township in Hamilton County, Iowa, USA.
