= Williams Township, Hamilton County, Iowa =

Township in Iowa, USA

Coordinates: 42°31′N 93°33′W

Williams Township is a township in Hamilton County, Iowa, USA.
