= Lyon Township, Hamilton County, Iowa =

Township in Iowa, USA

Coordinates: 42°20′N 93°38′W

Lyon Township is a township in Hamilton County, Iowa, USA. It has an average elevation of 1,089 feet (332 m) above the sea level, covering an area of 36.1 square miles (93 km^{2}). In the year 2023, the township had a total population of 1,564.
