= Blairsburg Township, Hamilton County, Iowa =

Township in Hamilton County, Iowa, United States

Coordinates: 42.5144°N 93.6761°W

Blairsburg Township is a township in Hamilton County, Iowa, United States. The township has a population of 284 as of 2024, and the township spans 35.9 square miles.
