= Marion Township, Hamilton County, Iowa =

Township in Iowa, USA

Coordinates: 42°15′N 93°52′W

Marion Township is a township in Hamilton County, Iowa, USA.
