= Hamilton County Courthouse (Iowa) =

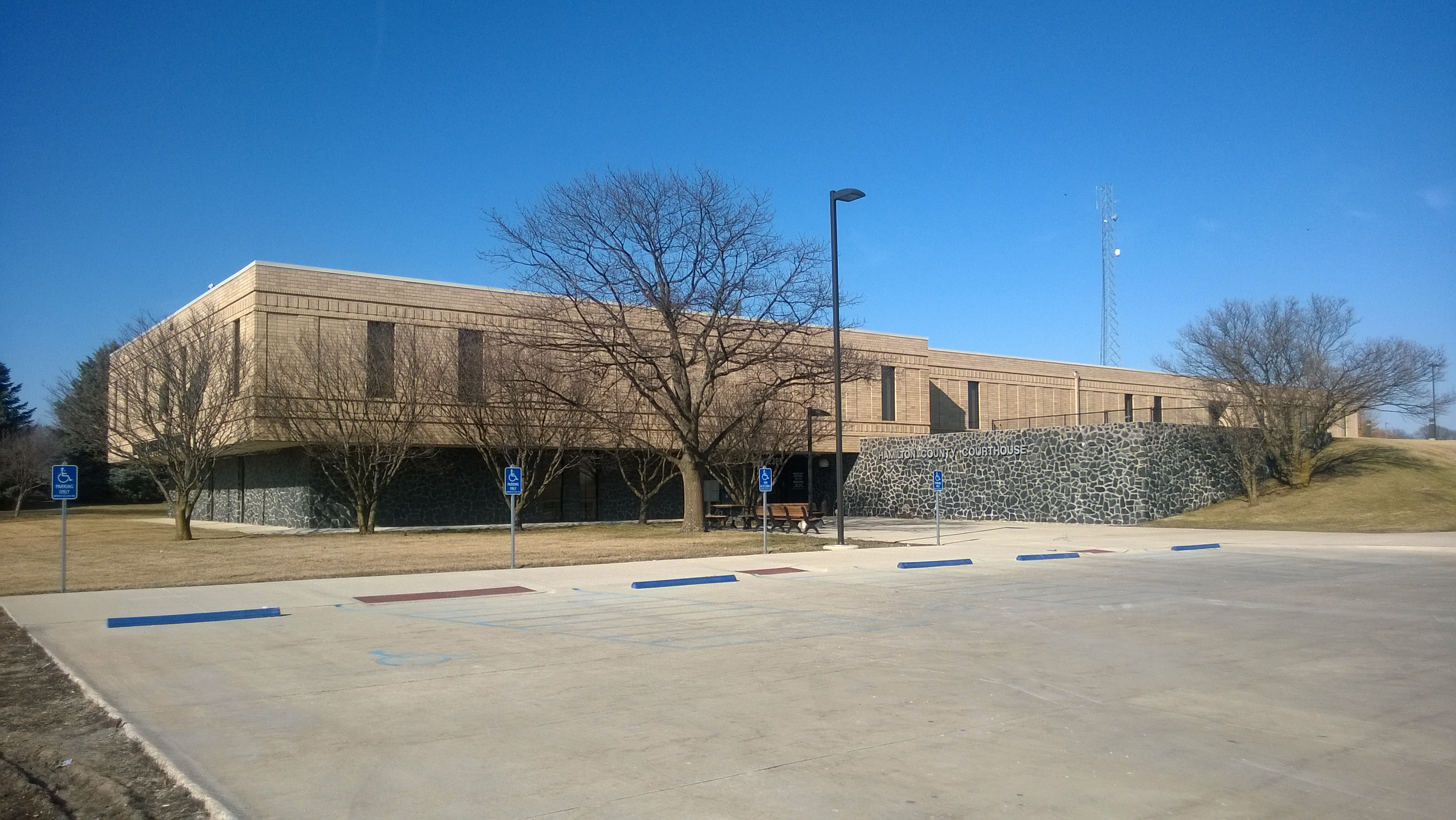
- Hamilton County Courthouse
- Interactive map of the Hamilton County Courthouse area

General information
- Type: Courthouse
- Architectural style: Modern
- Location: 2300 Superior St., Webster City, Iowa, United States
- Coordinates: 42.453272°N 93.814901°W
- Construction started: July 1975
- Completed: 1976

Technical details
- Floor count: Two

Design and construction
- Architecture firm: Smith, Voorhees, Jensen Associates
- Main contractor: Sande Construction & Supply Company

The Hamilton County Courthouse is located in Webster City, Iowa, United States. The current facility is the third structure that Hamilton County has used to house county administration and court functions.

== History ==
The first courthouse for the county was begun in 1858, but it had to be dismantled before it was completed because the county ran out of money to finish construction. A two-story frame courthouse was completed in the 1860s, and it was repurposed as a house in Webster City after the county built a new courthouse. Financing for the new courthouse provided difficult once again. The board of supervisors and voters agreed to sell swampland owned by the county to pay for it, but $5 an acre was considered too high and no one bought the land. At the same time, no contractor was willing to be paid in real estate and to put up the $50,000 bond required by the county. Finally, John M. Rice, a Chicago contractor, was awarded the contract in late 1875. He put up a $5,000 bond and was compensated with $30,000 in swampland funds and securities and 1,360 acres (550 ha) in swampland. The $30,000 was provided by 32 Webster City residents who agreed to buy 4,000 acres (1,600 ha) at $3.40 per acre. The three-story brick courthouse was designed by the architectural firm of Street & Baker, and dedicated on July 4, 1876. It featured round arch windows, a mansard roof and a cupola that was subsequently removed. The total cost of construction came to $37,837.17.

The present courthouse was completed on the south side of Webster City in 1976. It was designed by the Des Moines architectural firm of Smith, Voorhees, Jensen Associates, and it was built by Sande Construction & Supply Company. The exterior of the Modern two-story structure is composed of brick and black stone from Georgia. The present county jail was added in 2004.
