= Lake Ellsworth =

Lake Ellsworth or Ellsworth Lake may refer to:

- Lake Ellsworth (Antarctica), a subglacial lake
- Lake Ellsworth (Oklahoma), a reservoir in Oklahoma
- Ellsworth Lake (Michigan), part of the Elk River Chain of Lakes Watershed
