= Ellsworth, Iowa =

- City
- Location of Ellsworth, Iowa
- Coordinates: 42°18′37″N 93°34′55″W
- Country: USA
- State: Iowa
- County: Hamilton

Area
  - Total: 0.88 sq mi (2.29 km^{2})
  - Land: 0.88 sq mi (2.29 km^{2})
  - Water: 0 sq mi (0.00 km^{2})
- Elevation: 1,076 ft (328 m)

Population (2020)
  - Total: 508
  - Density: 575.1/sq mi (222.03/km^{2})
- Time zone: UTC-6 (Central (CST))
  - Summer (DST): UTC-5 (CDT)
- ZIP code: 50075
- Area code: 515
- FIPS code: 19-25050
- GNIS feature ID: 2394668
- Website: ellsworthiowa.org

Ellsworth is a city in Hamilton County, Iowa, United States. The population was 508 at the time of the 2020 census.

== History ==
Ellsworth was platted in 1880. It was named to honor the memory of Elmer E. Ellsworth, of the Chicago Zouaves who was murdered in Virginia in the early days of the war of the rebellion.

== Geography ==
According to the United States Census Bureau, the city has a total area of 0.90 square miles (2.33 km^{2}), all land.

== Demographics ==
Historical populations
Year	Pop.	±%
1900	319	—
1910	406	+27.3%
1920	512	+26.1%
1930	405	−20.9%
1940	444	+9.6%
1950	439	−1.1%
1960	493	+12.3%
1970	443	−10.1%
1980	480	+8.4%
1990	451	−6.0%
2000	531	+17.7%
2010	531	+0.0%
2020	508	−4.3%
Source:"U.S. Census website". United States Census Bureau. and Iowa Data Center; Source: U.S. Decennial Census

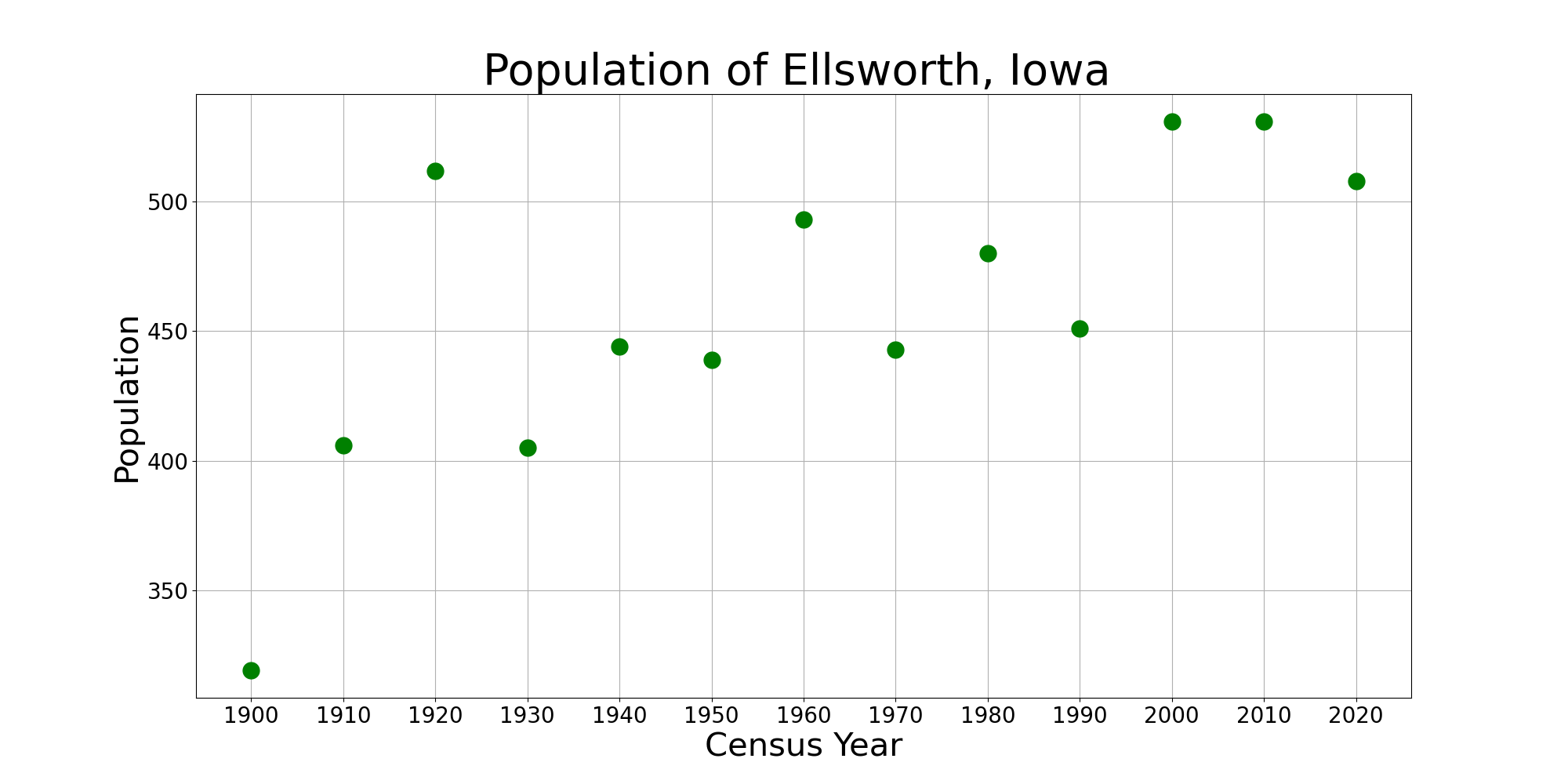
The population of Ellsworth, Iowa from US census data

=== 2020 census ===
As of the census of 2020, there were 508 people, 209 households, and 148 families residing in the city. The population density was 575.1 inhabitants per square mile (222.0/km^{2}). There were 223 housing units at an average density of 252.4 per square mile (97.5/km^{2}). The racial makeup of the city was 87.6% White, 0.4% Black or African American, 1.0% Native American, 0.4% Asian, 0.0% Pacific Islander, 3.0% from other races and 7.7% from two or more races. Hispanic or Latino persons of any race comprised 7.9% of the population.

Of the 209 households, 37.3% of which had children under the age of 18 living with them, 50.7% were married couples living together, 12.9% were cohabitating couples, 18.7% had a female householder with no spouse or partner present and 17.7% had a male householder with no spouse or partner present. 29.2% of all households were non-families. 23.0% of all households were made up of individuals, 10.0% had someone living alone who was 65 years old or older.

The median age in the city was 35.9 years. 28.0% of the residents were under the age of 20; 5.1% were between the ages of 20 and 24; 26.4% were from 25 and 44; 23.4% were from 45 and 64; and 17.1% were 65 years of age or older. The gender makeup of the city was 49.4% male and 50.6% female.

=== 2010 census ===
As of the census of 2010, there were 531 people, 213 households, and 145 families living in the city. The population density was 590.0 inhabitants per square mile (227.8/km^{2}). There were 230 housing units at an average density of 255.6 per square mile (98.7/km^{2}). The racial makeup of the city was 92.1% White, 0.2% African American, 2.1% Native American, 0.4% Asian, 4.1% from other races, and 1.1% from two or more races. Hispanic or Latino of any race were 6.8% of the population.

There were 213 households, of which 32.4% had children under the age of 18 living with them, 50.2% were married couples living together, 12.7% had a female householder with no husband present, 5.2% had a male householder with no wife present, and 31.9% were non-families. 25.8% of all households were made up of individuals, and 12.2% had someone living alone who was 65 years of age or older. The average household size was 2.49 and the average family size was 3.00.

The median age in the city was 36.1 years. 27.3% of residents were under the age of 18; 7.5% were between the ages of 18 and 24; 26.2% were from 25 to 44; 24.8% were from 45 to 64; and 14.3% were 65 years of age or older. The gender makeup of the city was 47.8% male and 52.2% female.

=== 2000 census ===
At the 2000 census, there were 531 people, 204 households and 138 families living in the city. The population density was 589.9 inhabitants per square mile (227.8/km^{2}). There were 219 housing units at an average density of 243.3 per square mile (93.9/km^{2}). The racial makeup of the city was 91.90% White, 1.32% Native American, 6.03% from other races, and 0.75% from two or more races. Hispanic or Latino of any race were 11.49% of the population.

There were 204 households, of which 34.8% had children under the age of 18 living with them, 54.4% were married couples living together, 11.8% had a female householder with no husband present, and 31.9% were non-families. 27.0% of all households were made up of individuals, and 15.7% had someone living alone who was 65 years of age or older. The average household size was 2.60 and the average family size was 3.17.

29.4% of the population were under the age of 18, 10.5% from 18 to 24, 29.4% from 25 to 44, 15.4% from 45 to 64, and 15.3% who were 65 years of age or older. The median age was 32 years. For every 100 females, there were 92.4 males. For every 100 females age 18 and over, there were 89.4 males.

The median household income was $30,893 and the median family was $36,250. Males had a median income of $28,365 versus $21,250 for females. The per capita income for the city was $15,299. About 8.3% of families and 11.2% of the population were below the poverty line, including 16.5% of those under age 18 and 11.0% of those age 65 or over.

== Education ==
South Hamilton Community School District serves this community.
