= Jewell Junction, Iowa =

- City
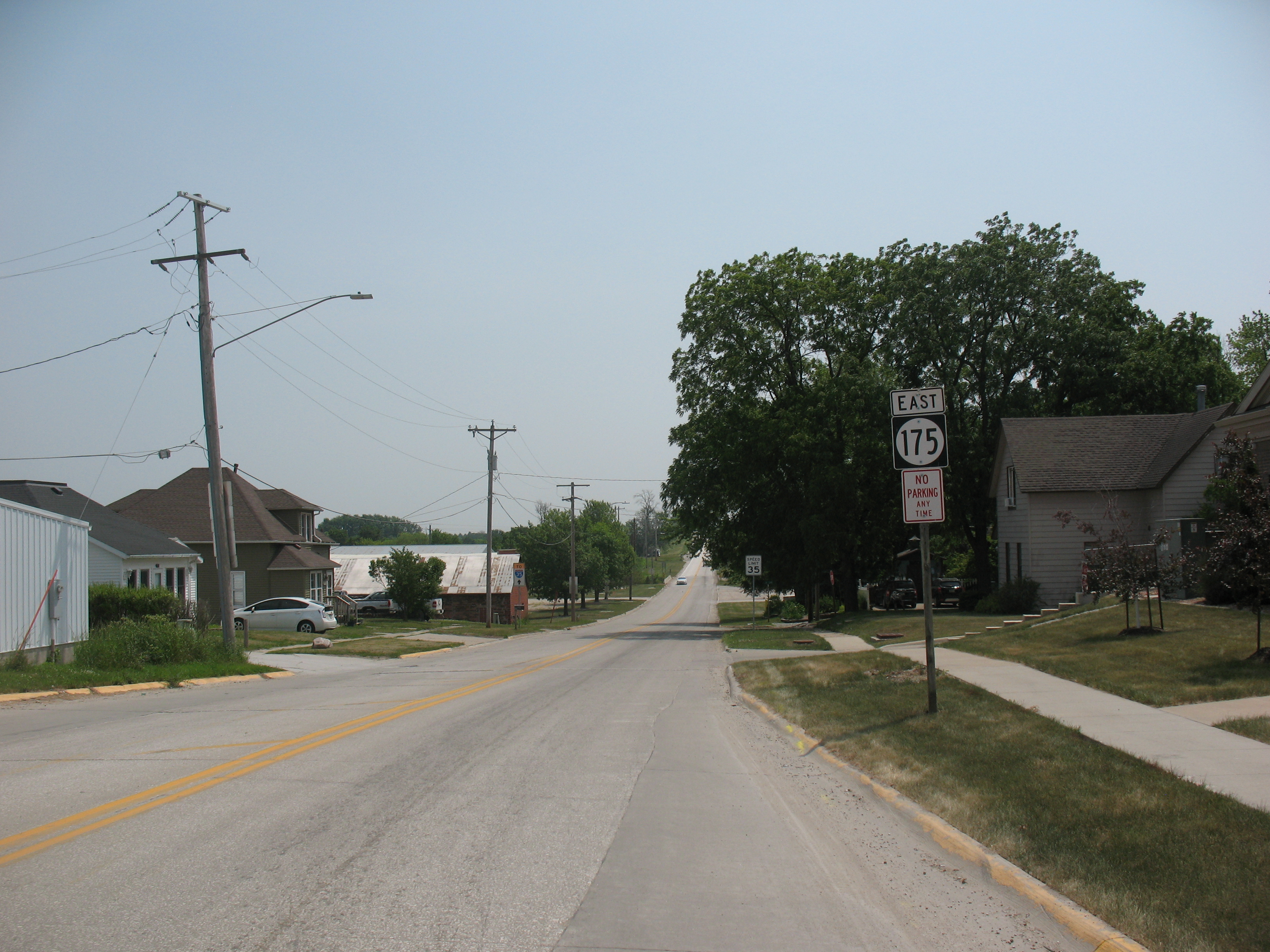
- Iowa Highway 175 eastbound in Jewell Junction

- Location of Jewell Junction, Iowa
- Coordinates: 42°18′38″N 93°37′52″W
- Country: USA
- State: Iowa
- County: Hamilton

Area
  - Total: 3.99 sq mi (10.34 km^{2})
  - Land: 3.87 sq mi (10.03 km^{2})
  - Water: 0.12 sq mi (0.32 km^{2})
- Elevation: 1,056 ft (322 m)

Population (2020)
  - Total: 1,216
  - Density: 314.1/sq mi (121.28/km^{2})
- Time zone: UTC-6 (Central (CST))
  - Summer (DST): UTC-5 (CDT)
- ZIP code: 50130
- Area code: 515
- FIPS code: 19-39675
- GNIS feature ID: 2395471

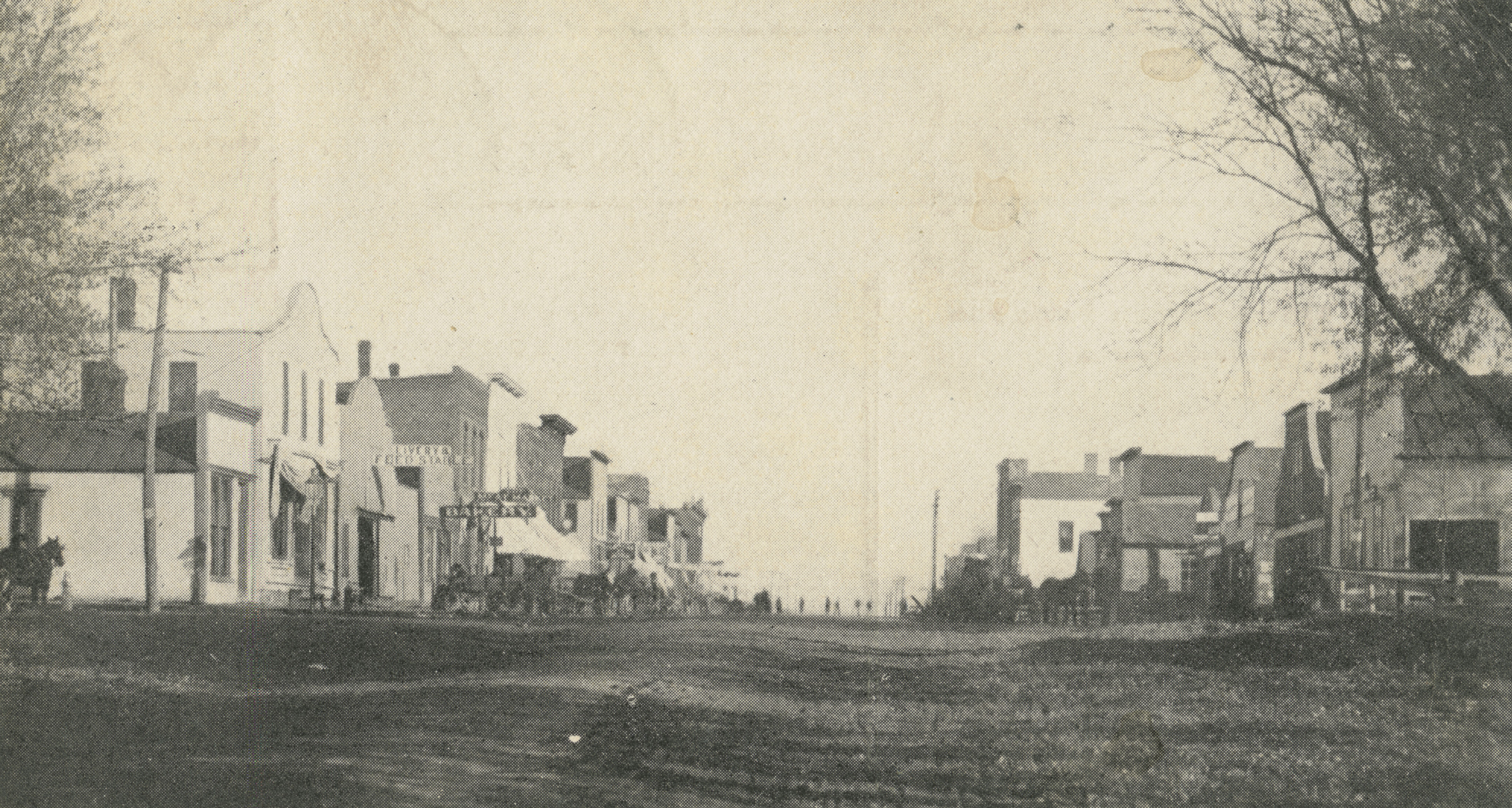
Main Street, 1910

Jewell Junction, better known as Jewell, is a city in Hamilton County, Iowa, United States. The population was 1,216 at the time of the 2020 census.

== History ==
Jewell Junction was platted in 1880. It was named for D. T. Jewell, the original owner of the town site. A post office called Jewell has been in operation since 1880.

== Geography ==
According to the United States Census Bureau, the city has a total area of 3.99 square miles (10.33 km^{2}), of which 3.87 square miles (10.02 km^{2}) is land and 0.12 square miles (0.31 km^{2}) is water.

Nearby Anderson Goose Lake is a National Natural Landmark.

== Demographics ==
Historical populations
Year	Pop.	±%
1890	414	—
1900	947	+128.7%
1910	941	−0.6%
1920	1,090	+15.8%
1930	950	−12.8%
1940	1,051	+10.6%
1950	973	−7.4%
1960	1,113	+14.4%
1970	1,152	+3.5%
1980	1,145	−0.6%
1990	1,106	−3.4%
2000	1,239	+12.0%
2010	1,215	−1.9%
2020	1,216	+0.1%
Source:"U.S. Census website". United States Census Bureau. and Iowa Data Center; Source: U.S. Decennial Census

=== 2020 census ===
As of the 2020 census, Jewell Junction had a population of 1,216, with 483 households and 333 families residing in the city. The median age was 38.9 years. 28.3% of residents were under the age of 18 and 16.0% were 65 years of age or older. For every 100 females, there were 97.4 males, and for every 100 females age 18 and over there were 93.3 males age 18 and over.

The population density was 314.1 inhabitants per square mile (121.3/km^{2}). There were 517 housing units at an average density of 133.6 per square mile (51.6/km^{2}). Of all housing units, 6.6% were vacant. The homeowner vacancy rate was 1.3% and the rental vacancy rate was 8.1%. 0.0% of residents lived in urban areas, while 100.0% lived in rural areas.

Of the 483 households, 35.6% had children under the age of 18 living in them. Of all households, 52.6% were married-couple households, 5.6% were cohabiting-couple households, 16.4% were households with a male householder and no spouse or partner present, and 25.5% were households with a female householder and no spouse or partner present. About 31.1% of all households were non-families, 26.9% were made up of individuals, and 13.7% had someone living alone who was 65 years of age or older.

31.5% of residents were under the age of 20, 3.9% were between the ages of 20 and 24, 21.9% were from 25 to 44, and 26.8% were from 45 to 64. The gender makeup of the city was 49.3% male and 50.7% female.

Racial composition as of the 2020 census
Race	Number	Percent
White	1,098	90.3%
Black or African American	8	0.7%
American Indian and Alaska Native	4	0.3%
Asian	9	0.7%
Native Hawaiian and Other Pacific Islander	0	0.0%
Some other race	40	3.3%
Two or more races	57	4.7%
Hispanic or Latino (of any race)	74	6.1%

=== 2010 census ===
As of the census of 2010, there were 1,215 people, 478 households, and 336 families living in the city. The population density was 314.0 inhabitants per square mile (121.2/km^{2}). There were 517 housing units at an average density of 133.6 per square mile (51.6/km^{2}). The racial makeup of the city was 95.2% White, 0.1% African American, 1.2% Asian, 2.2% from other races, and 1.3% from two or more races. Hispanic or Latino of any race were 4.4% of the population.

There were 478 households, of which 36.0% had children under the age of 18 living with them, 56.7% were married couples living together, 9.8% had a female householder with no husband present, 3.8% had a male householder with no wife present, and 29.7% were non-families. 25.9% of all households were made up of individuals, and 10.2% had someone living alone who was 65 years of age or older. The average household size was 2.54 and the average family size was 3.08.

The median age in the city was 39.3 years. 29.3% of residents were under the age of 18; 4.5% were between the ages of 18 and 24; 25.1% were from 25 to 44; 27.8% were from 45 to 64; and 13.3% were 65 years of age or older. The gender makeup of the city was 49.6% male and 50.4% female.

=== 2000 census ===
As of the census of 2000, there were 1,239 people, 475 households, and 341 families living in the city. The population density was 319.7 inhabitants per square mile (123.4/km^{2}). There were 499 housing units at an average density of 128.7 per square mile (49.7/km^{2}). The racial makeup of the city was 96.53% White, 0.08% African American, 0.16% Native American, 1.94% Asian, 0.48% from other races, and 0.81% from two or more races. Hispanic or Latino of any race were 1.21% of the population.

There were 475 households, out of which 37.5% had children under the age of 18 living with them, 62.9% were married couples living together, 4.8% had a female householder with no husband present, and 28.2% were non-families. 24.0% of all households were made up of individuals, and 12.6% had someone living alone who was 65 years of age or older. The average household size was 2.58 and the average family size was 3.09.

29.4% were under the age of 18, 5.0% from 18 to 24, 30.5% from 25 to 44, 20.8% from 45 to 64, and 14.3% were 65 years of age or older. The median age was 36 years. For every 100 females, there were 106.2 males. For every 100 females age 18 and over, there were 97.1 males.

The median income for a household in the city was $42,614, and the median income for a family was $50,139. Males had a median income of $32,042 versus $25,323 for females. The per capita income for the city was $18,780. About 1.4% of families and 4.4% of the population were below the poverty line, including 5.5% of those under age 18 and 5.0% of those age 65 or over.

== Education ==
Jewell is home to the South Hamilton Community School District, which serves Jewell, Ellsworth, Stanhope, and Randall.

Jewell was once home to Jewell Lutheran College, which closed in 1924.

== Notable resident ==
- Brian Thompson
