= Justice Ellsworth (disambiguation) =

Justice Ellsworth refers to Oliver Ellsworth (1745–1807), the third chief justice of the United States Supreme Court. Justice Ellsworth may also refer to:

- Sidney E. Ellsworth (1862–1935), associate justice of the North Dakota Supreme Court
- William W. Ellsworth (1791–1868), associate justice of the Supreme Court of Connecticut
