= Stratford, Iowa =

- City
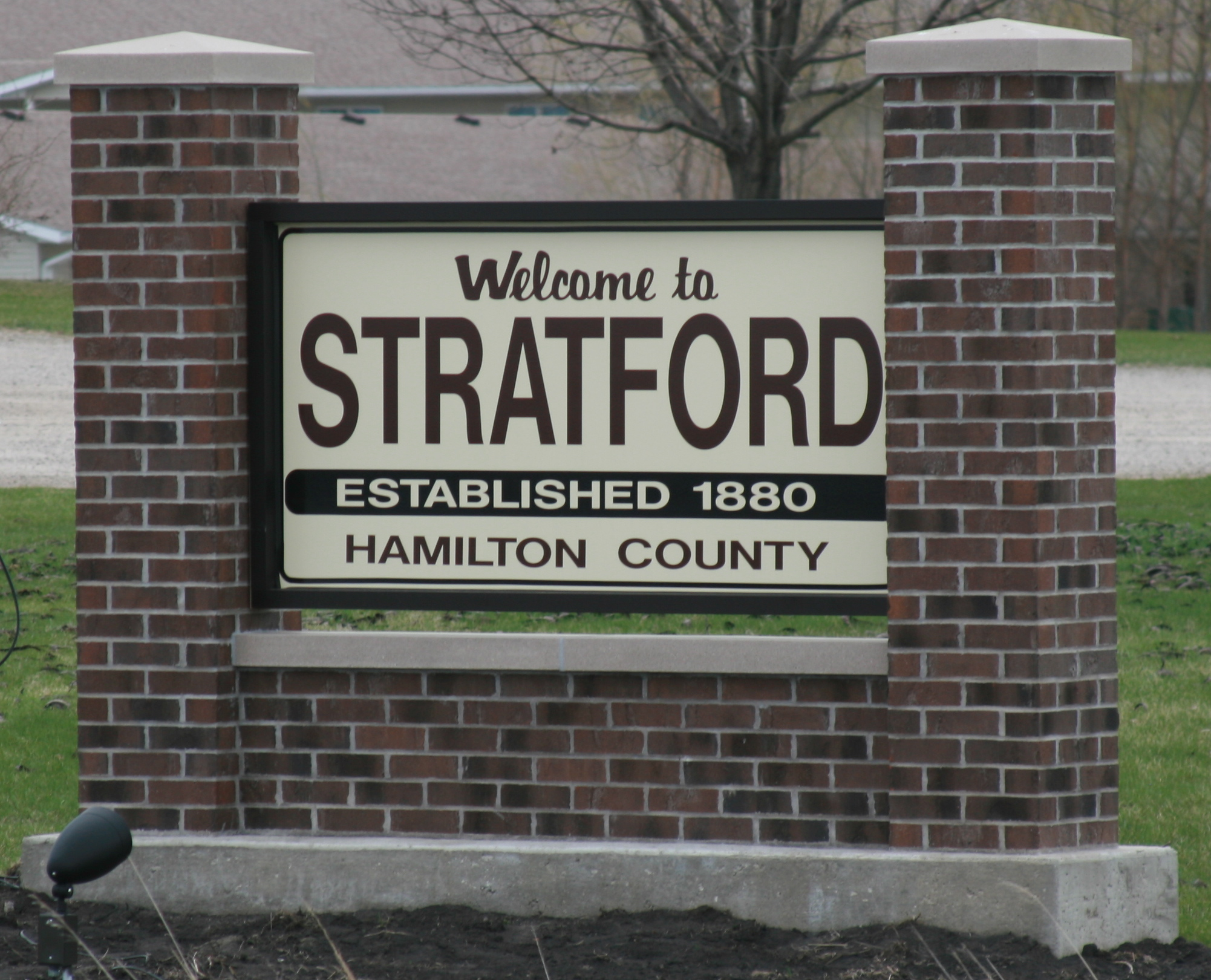
- City sign
- Motto: The place to be
- Location of Stratford, Iowa
- Coordinates: 42°16′11″N 93°55′39″W
- Country: USA
- State: Iowa
- Counties: Hamilton, Webster

Area
  - Total: 1.81 sq mi (4.70 km^{2})
  - Land: 1.81 sq mi (4.70 km^{2})
  - Water: 0 sq mi (0.00 km^{2})
- Elevation: 1,116 ft (340 m)

Population (2020)
  - Total: 707
  - Density: 389.5/sq mi (150.39/km^{2})
- Time zone: UTC-6 (Central (CST))
  - Summer (DST): UTC-5 (CDT)
- ZIP code: 50249
- Area code: 515
- FIPS code: 19-75810
- GNIS feature ID: 2395984
- Website: www.stratfordiowa.com

Stratford is a city in Hamilton and Webster counties in the U.S. state of Iowa. The population was 707 at the time of the 2020 census.

== History ==
Stratford was platted in 1880. It was named after Stratford-upon-Avon, in England. A post office has been in operation in Stratford since 1881. Stratford was actually first founded at Hook's Point, Hamilton County, Iowa. Stratford had a train coming through from 1880 until World War II. Stratford has an independent school system with an elementary school located on the corner of Shakespeare Avenue and Dryden Street.

An F3 tornado struck Stratford on November 12, 2005, with one person killed.

== Geography ==
According to the United States Census Bureau, the city has a total area of 1.91 square miles (4.95 km^{2}), all land.

== Demographics ==
Historical populations
Year	Pop.	±%
1900	458	—
1910	554	+21.0%
1920	694	+25.3%
1930	699	+0.7%
1940	712	+1.9%
1950	673	−5.5%
1960	703	+4.5%
1970	710	+1.0%
1980	806	+13.5%
1990	715	−11.3%
2000	746	+4.3%
2010	743	−0.4%
2020	707	−4.8%
Source:"U.S. Census website". United States Census Bureau. and Iowa Data Center; Source: U.S. Decennial Census

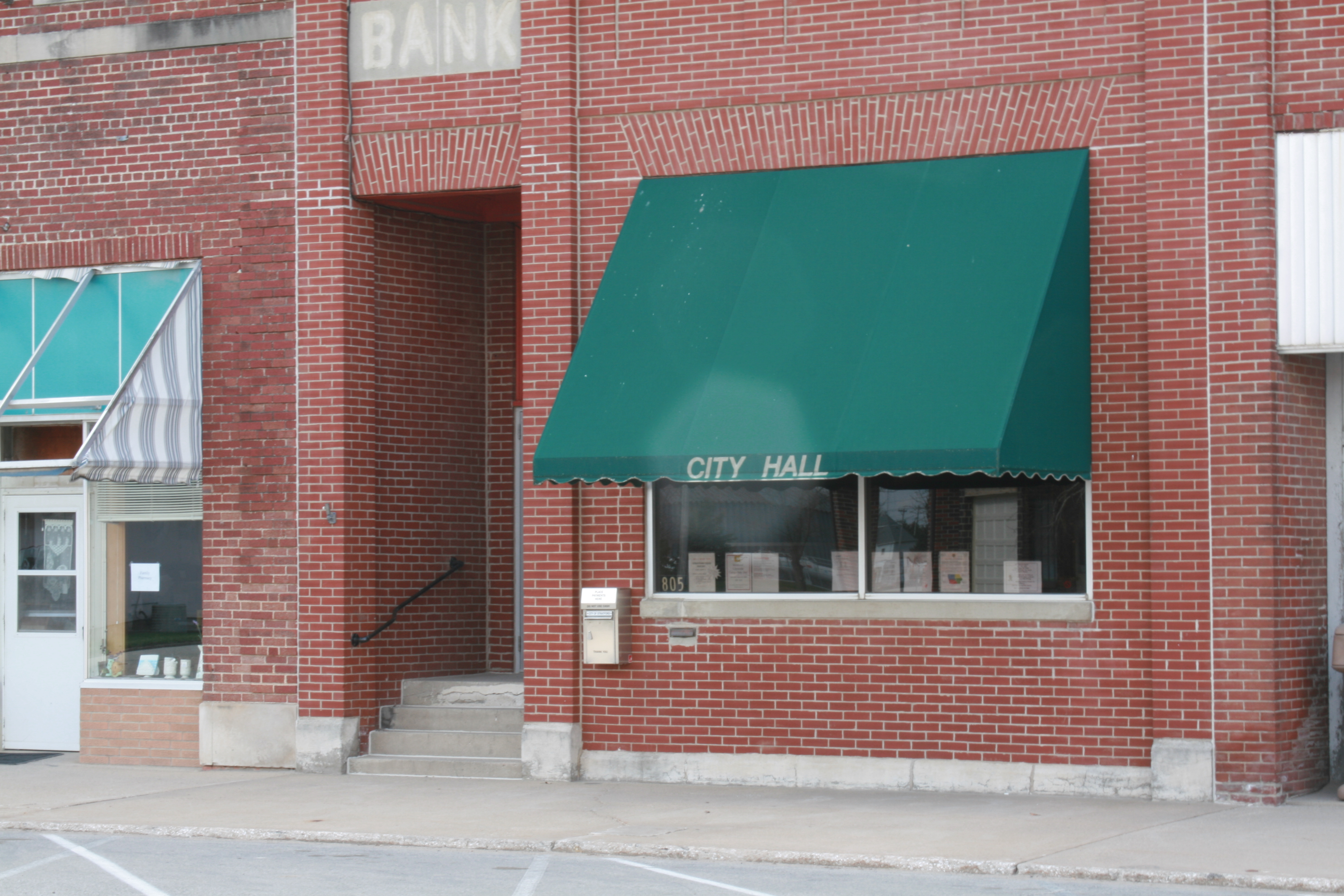
Stratford City Hall

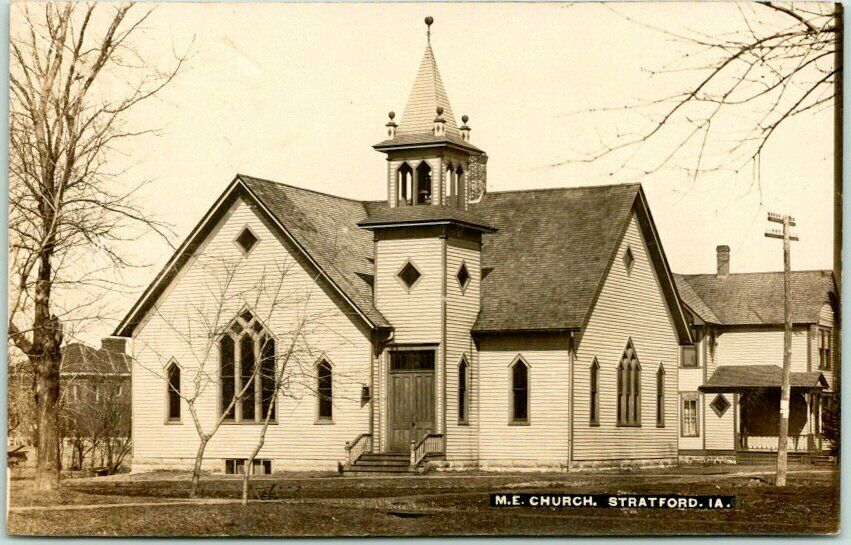
A church in Stratford seen in 1912

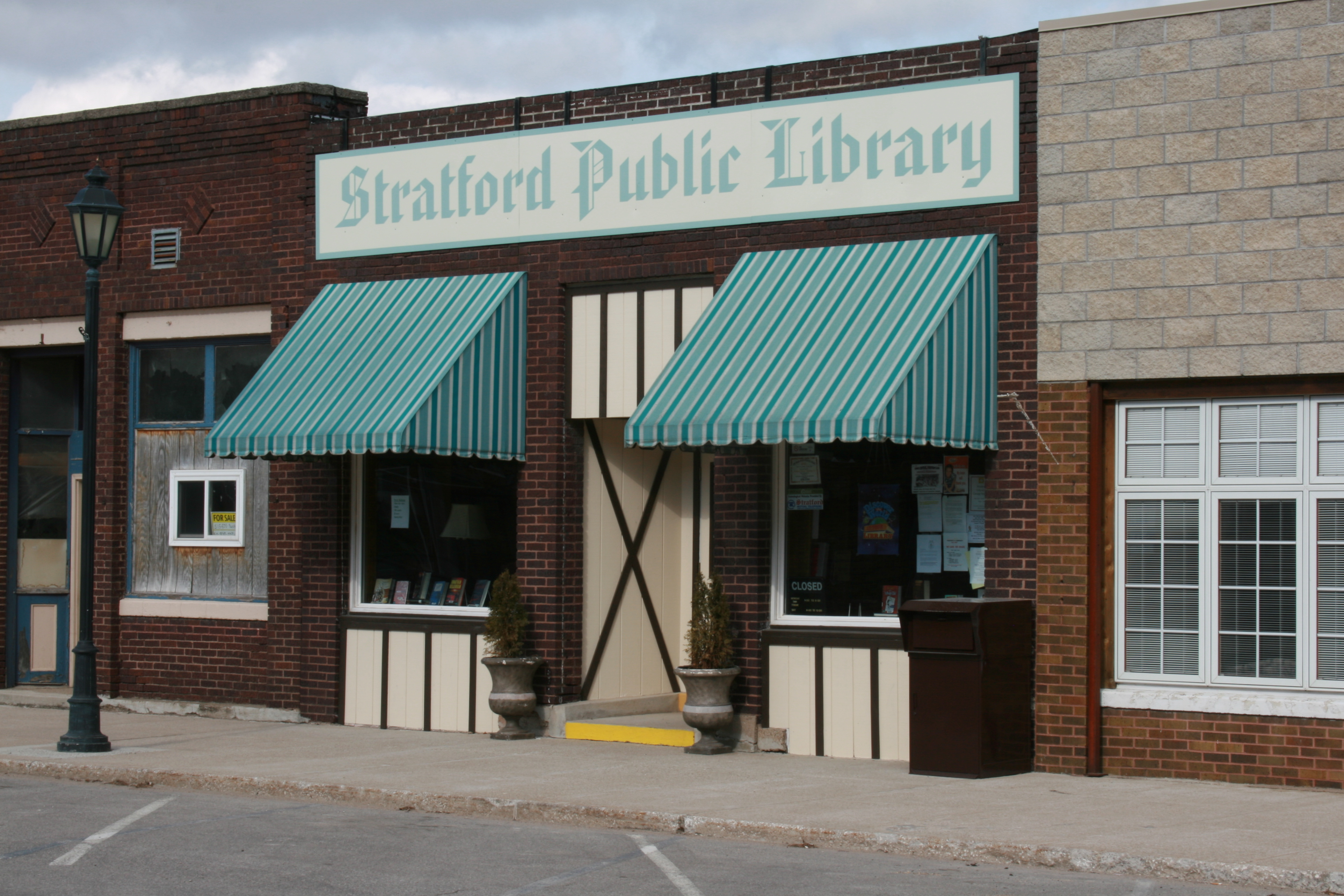
Stratford Public Library

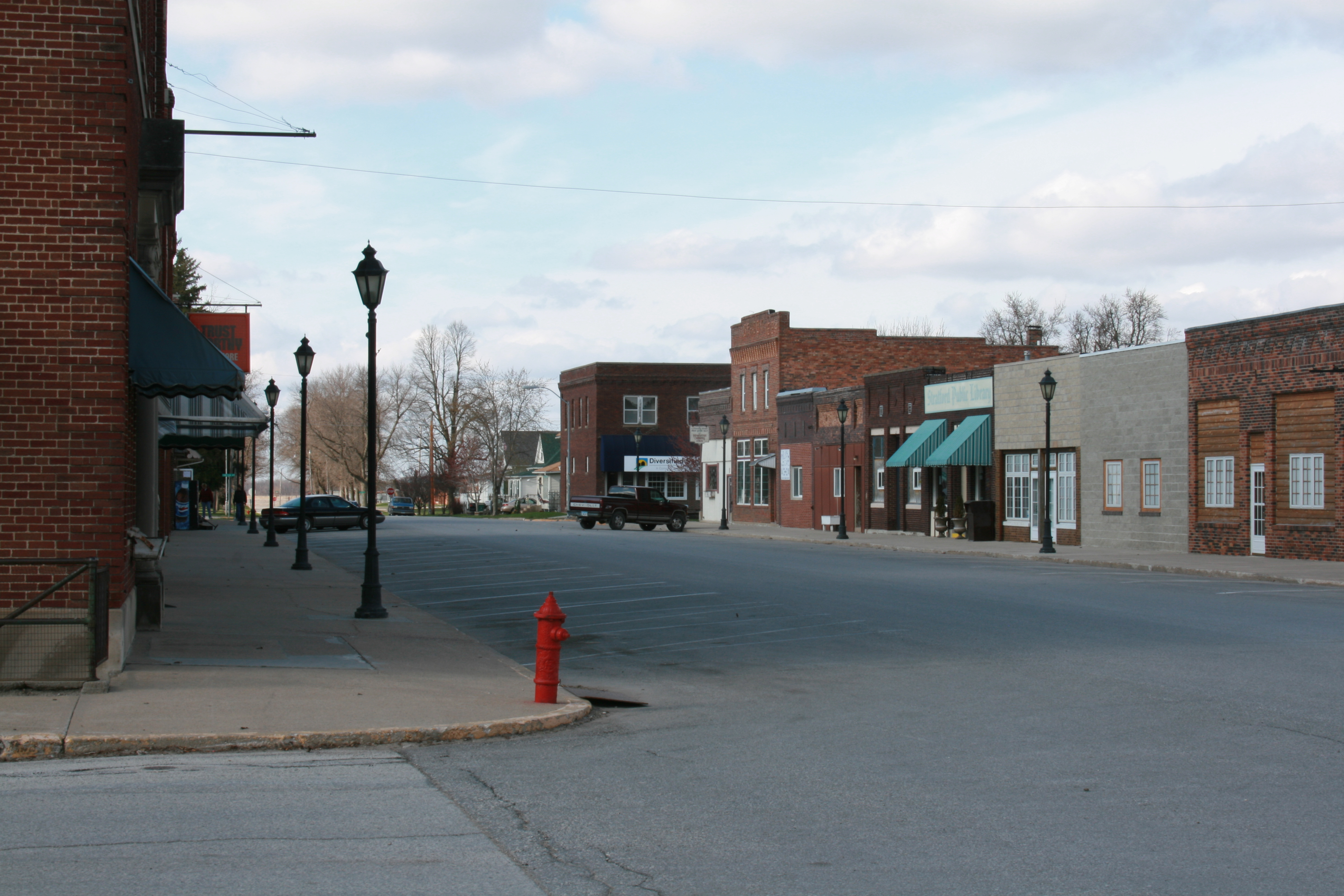
Downtown Stratford

=== 2020 census ===
As of the census of 2020, there were 707 people, 284 households, and 167 families residing in the city. The population density was 389.5 inhabitants per square mile (150.4/km^{2}). There were 327 housing units at an average density of 180.2 per square mile (69.6/km^{2}). The racial makeup of the city was 93.6% White, 0.4% Black or African American, 0.1% Native American, 0.1% Asian, 0.0% Pacific Islander, 0.6% from other races and 5.1% from two or more races. Hispanic or Latino persons of any race comprised 3.7% of the population.

Of the 284 households, 24.6% of which had children under the age of 18 living with them, 44.4% were married couples living together, 7.4% were cohabitating couples, 28.5% had a female householder with no spouse or partner present and 19.7% had a male householder with no spouse or partner present. 41.2% of all households were non-families. 35.6% of all households were made up of individuals, 22.9% had someone living alone who was 65 years old or older.

The median age in the city was 50.8 years. 18.4% of the residents were under the age of 20; 5.4% were between the ages of 20 and 24; 21.5% were from 25 and 44; 21.9% were from 45 and 64; and 32.8% were 65 years of age or older. The gender makeup of the city was 49.1% male and 50.9% female.

=== 2010 census ===
As of the census of 2010, there were 743 people, 307 households, and 183 families living in the city. The population density was 389.0 inhabitants per square mile (150.2/km^{2}). There were 334 housing units at an average density of 174.9 per square mile (67.5/km^{2}). The racial makeup of the city was 99.2% White and 0.8% from two or more races. Hispanic or Latino of any race were 1.3% of the population.

There were 307 households, of which 26.1% had children under the age of 18 living with them, 49.2% were married couples living together, 7.8% had a female householder with no husband present, 2.6% had a male householder with no wife present, and 40.4% were non-families. 36.2% of all households were made up of individuals, and 21.2% had someone living alone who was 65 years of age or older. The average household size was 2.25 and the average family size was 2.96.

The median age in the city was 46.3 years. 22.2% of residents were under the age of 18; 6.3% were between the ages of 18 and 24; 19.1% were from 25 to 44; 25.5% were from 45 to 64; and 26.9% were 65 years of age or older. The gender makeup of the city was 49.3% male and 50.7% female.

=== 2000 census ===
As of the census of 2000, there were 746 people, 307 households, and 186 families living in the city. The population density was 387.7 inhabitants per square mile (149.7/km^{2}). There were 324 housing units at an average density of 168.4 per square mile (65.0/km^{2}). The racial makeup of the city was 99.06% White, and 0.94% from two or more races. Hispanic or Latino of any race were 0.27% of the population.

There were 307 households, out of which 24.1% had children under the age of 18 living with them, 52.4% were married couples living together, 5.5% had a female householder with no husband present, and 39.1% were non-families. 35.5% of all households were made up of individuals, and 22.5% had someone living alone who was 65 years of age or older. The average household size was 2.21 and the average family size was 2.90.

In the city, the population was spread out, with 20.2% under the age of 18, 6.6% from 18 to 24, 22.8% from 25 to 44, 20.9% from 45 to 64, and 29.5% who were 65 years of age or older. The median age was 45 years. For every 100 females, there were 91.8 males. For every 100 females age 18 and over, there were 80.9 males.

The median income for a household in the city was $29,375, and the median income for a family was $41,042. Males had a median income of $28,571 versus $22,344 for females. The per capita income for the city was $15,553. About 2.3% of families and 5.7% of the population were below the poverty line, including 5.9% of those under age 18 and 3.2% of those age 65 or over.
