= Hamilton County, Iowa =

County in Iowa, United States

- County
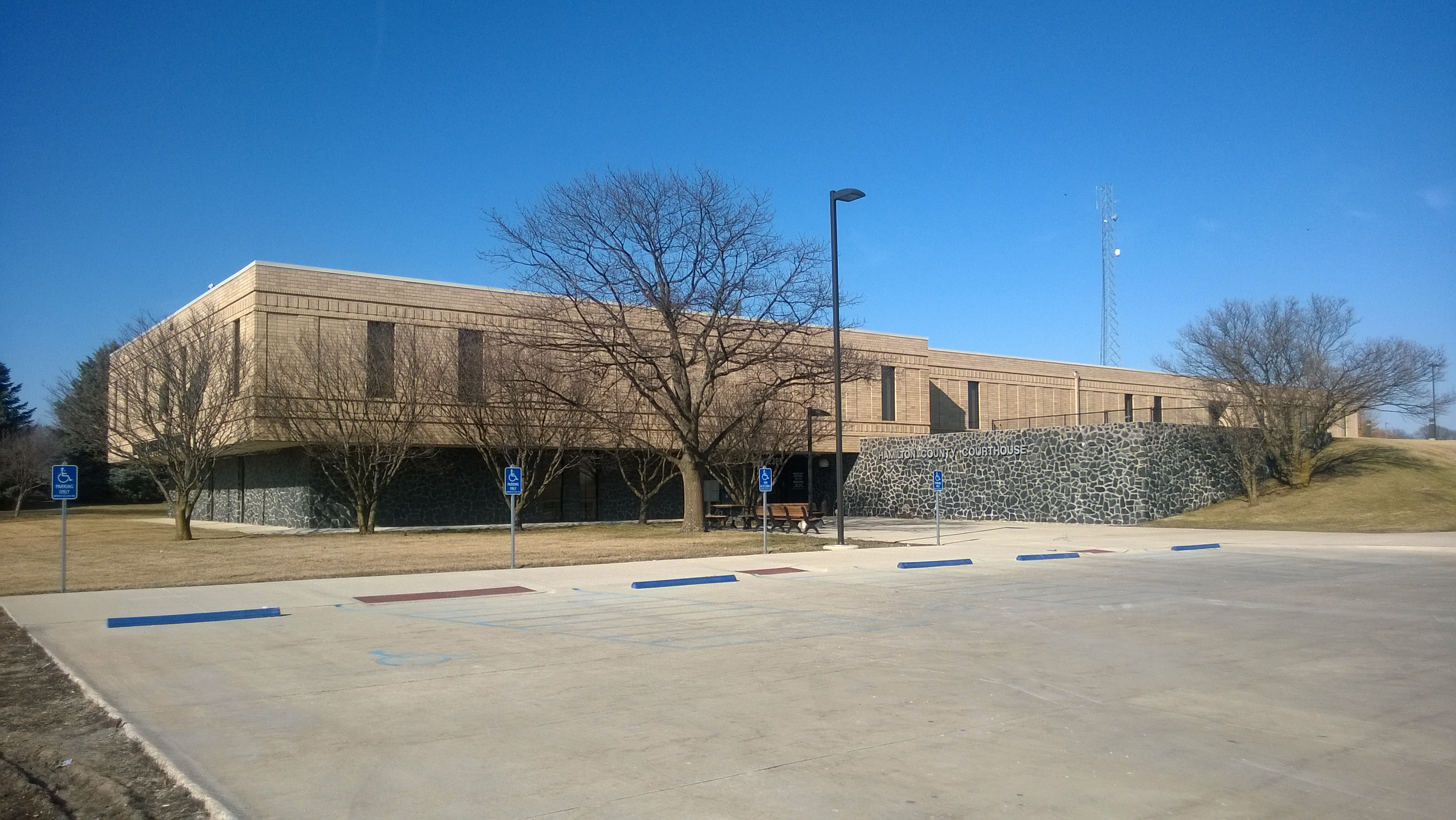
- The Hamilton County Courthouse in Webster City

- Location within the U.S. state of Iowa
- Coordinates: 42.390789°N 93.709130°W
- Country: United States
- State: Iowa
- Founded: January 8, 1857
- Named for: William W. Hamilton
- Seat: Webster City
- Largest city: Webster City

Area
  - Total: 577.486 sq mi (1,495.68 km^{2})
  - Land: 576.731 sq mi (1,493.73 km^{2})
  - Water: 0.755 sq mi (1.96 km^{2}) 0.13%

Population (2020)
  - Total: 15,039
  - Estimate (2025): 14,944 ▼
  - Density: 26.076/sq mi (10.068/km^{2})
- Time zone: UTC−6 (Central)
  - Summer (DST): UTC−5 (CDT)
- Area code: 515
- Congressional district: 4th
- Website: hamiltoncounty.iowa.gov
- Iowa county number 40

Hamilton County is a county located in the U.S. state of Iowa. As of the 2020 census, the population was 15,039, and was estimated to be 14,944 in 2025. The county seat and the largest city is Webster City. The county was named to honor William W. Hamilton, a President of the Iowa State Senate.

== Geography ==
According to the United States Census Bureau, the county has a total area of 577.486 square miles (1,495.68 km^{2}), of which 576.731 square miles (1,493.73 km^{2}) is land and 0.755 square miles (1.96 km^{2}) (0.13%) is water. It is the 36th largest county in Iowa by total area. The largest body of water is Little Wall Lake.

=== Major highways ===
- Interstate 35
- U.S. Highway 20
- U.S. Highway 69
- Iowa Highway 17
- Iowa Highway 175

=== Adjacent counties ===
- Wright County (north)
- Hardin County (east)
- Story County (southeast)
- Boone County (southwest)
- Webster County (west)

== Demographics ==
Historical population
| Census | Pop. | Note | %± |
|---|---|---|---|
| 1860 | 1,699 | | — |
| 1870 | 6,055 | | 256.4% |
| 1880 | 11,252 | | 85.8% |
| 1890 | 15,319 | | 36.1% |
| 1900 | 19,514 | | 27.4% |
| 1910 | 19,242 | | −1.4% |
| 1920 | 19,531 | | 1.5% |
| 1930 | 20,978 | | 7.4% |
| 1940 | 19,922 | | −5.0% |
| 1950 | 19,660 | | −1.3% |
| 1960 | 20,032 | | 1.9% |
| 1970 | 18,383 | | −8.2% |
| 1980 | 17,862 | | −2.8% |
| 1990 | 16,071 | | −10.0% |
| 2000 | 16,438 | | 2.3% |
| 2010 | 15,673 | | −4.7% |
| 2020 | 15,039 | | −4.0% |
| 2025 (est.) | 14,944 | ▼ | −0.6% |
U.S. Decennial Census; 1790–1960 1900–1990; 1990–2000 2010–2020

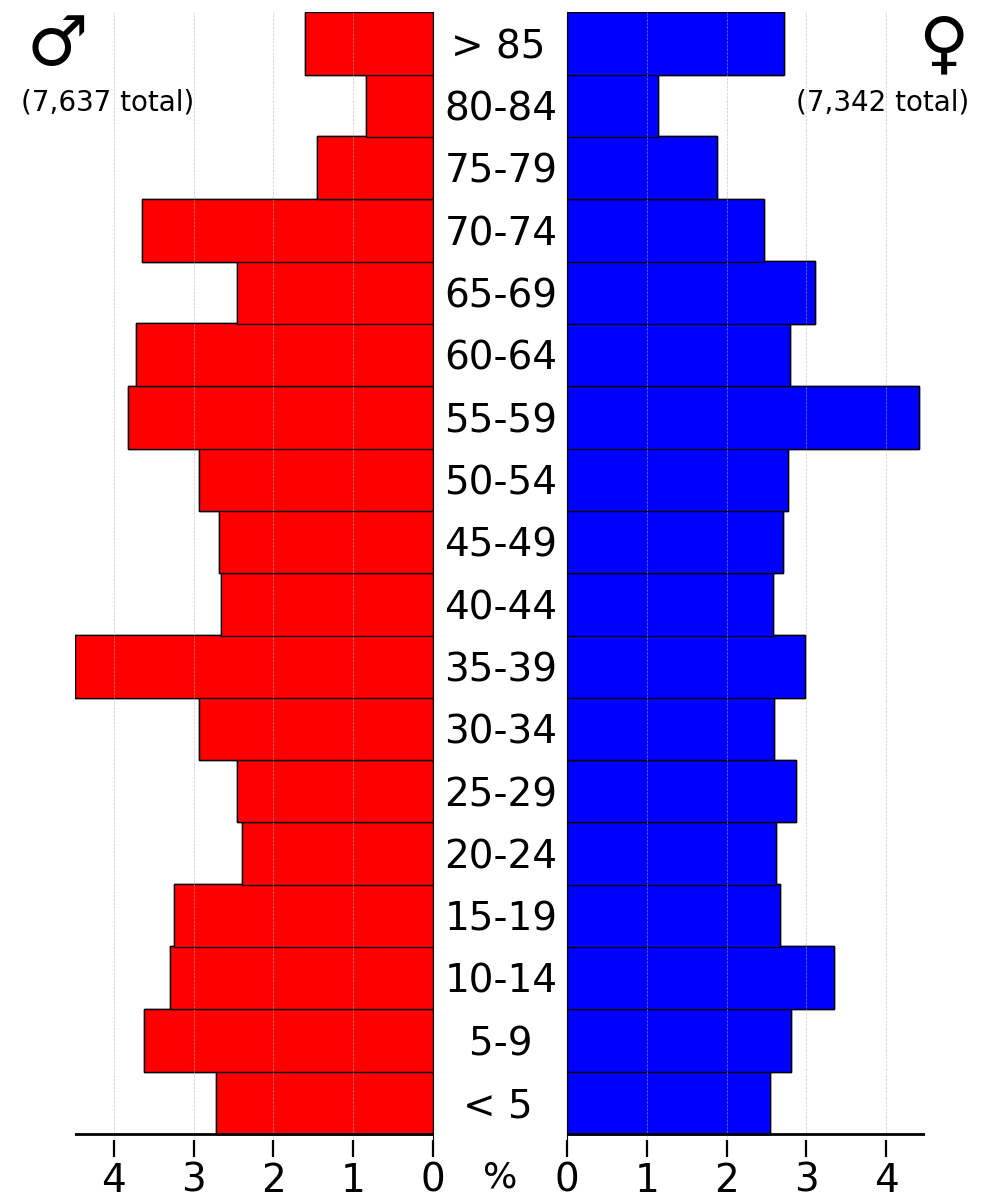
2022 US Census population pyramid for Hamilton County from ACS 5-year estimates

As of the second quarter of 2025, the median home value in Hamilton County was $148,851.

As of the 2023 American Community Survey, there are 6,317 estimated households in Hamilton County with an average of 2.33 persons per household. The county has a median household income of $71,750. Approximately 8.0% of the county's population lives at or below the poverty line. Hamilton County has an estimated 60.8% employment rate, with 22.0% of the population holding a bachelor's degree or higher and 92.6% holding a high school diploma. There were 7,056 housing units at an average density of 12.23 per square mile (4.7/km^{2}).

The top five reported languages (people were allowed to report up to two languages, thus the figures will generally add to more than 100%) were English (98.0%), Spanish (1.3%), Indo-European (0.6%), Asian and Pacific Islander (0.1%), and Other (0.0%).

The median age in the county was 42.2 years.

Hamilton County, Iowa – racial and ethnic composition Note: the US Census treats Hispanic/Latino as an ethnic category. This table excludes Latinos from the racial categories and assigns them to a separate category. Hispanics/Latinos may be of any race.
| Race / ethnicity (NH = non-Hispanic) | Pop. 1980 | Pop. 1990 | Pop. 2000 | Pop. 2010 | Pop. 2020 |
|---|---|---|---|---|---|
| White alone (NH) | 17,671 (98.93%) | 15,843 (98.58%) | 15,792 (96.07%) | 14,344 (91.52%) | 12,702 (84.46%) |
| Black or African American alone (NH) | 10 (0.06%) | 9 (0.06%) | 38 (0.23%) | 40 (0.26%) | 88 (0.59%) |
| Native American or Alaska Native alone (NH) | 18 (0.10%) | 21 (0.13%) | 23 (0.14%) | 26 (0.17%) | 25 (0.17%) |
| Asian alone (NH) | 47 (0.26%) | 82 (0.51%) | 240 (1.46%) | 311 (1.98%) | 314 (2.09%) |
| Pacific Islander alone (NH) | — | — | 1 (0.01%) | 0 (0.00%) | 0 (0.00%) |
| Other race alone (NH) | 21 (0.12%) | 0 (0.00%) | 8 (0.05%) | 8 (0.05%) | 27 (0.18%) |
| Mixed race or multiracial (NH) | — | — | 102 (0.62%) | 162 (1.03%) | 418 (2.78%) |
| Hispanic or Latino (any race) | 95 (0.53%) | 116 (0.72%) | 234 (1.42%) | 782 (4.99%) | 1,465 (9.74%) |
| Total | 17,862 (100.00%) | 16,071 (100.00%) | 16,438 (100.00%) | 15,673 (100.00%) | 15,039 (100.00%) |

=== 2024 estimate ===
As of the 2024 estimate, there were 14,856 people, 6,317 households, and _ families residing in the county. The population density was 25.76 inhabitants per square mile (9.9/km^{2}). There were 7,056 housing units at an average density of 12.23 per square mile (4.7/km^{2}). The racial makeup of the city was 93.0% White (83.7% NH White), 1.4% African American, 1.0% Native American, 2.6% Asian, 0.1% Pacific Islander, _% from some other races and 1.9% from two or more races. Hispanic or Latino people of any race were 10.9% of the population.

=== 2020 census ===
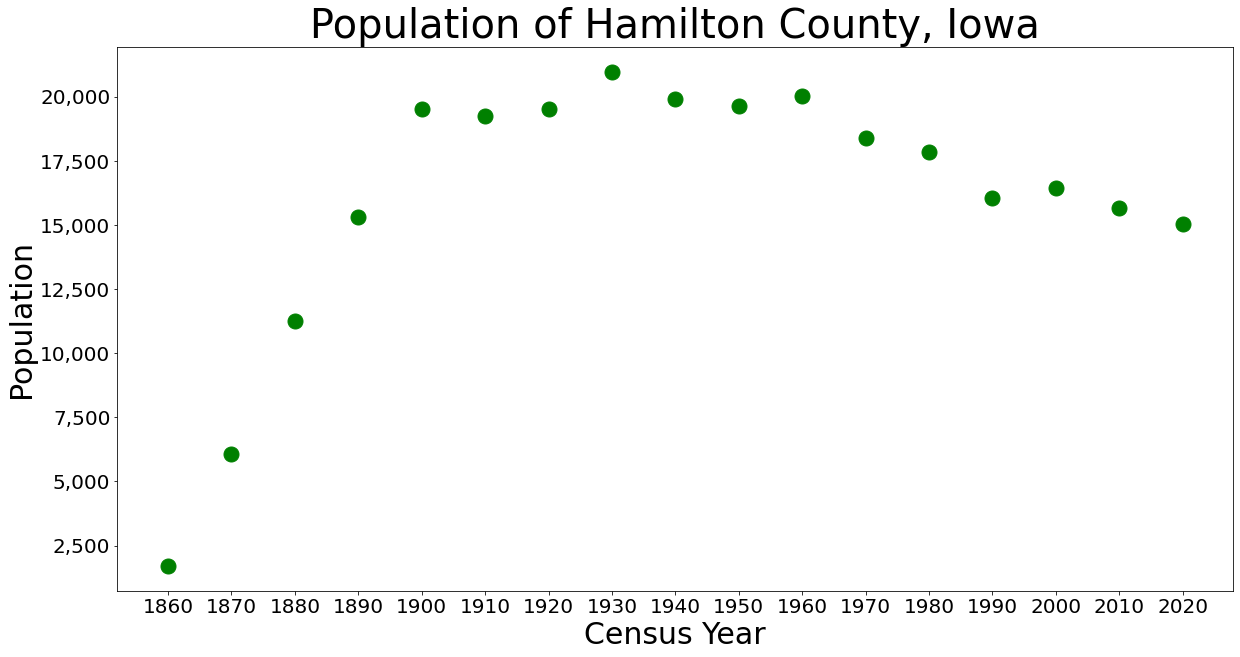
Population of Hamilton County from US census data

As of the 2020 census, there were 15,039 people, 6,283 households, and 4,053 families residing in the county. The population density was 26.08 inhabitants per square mile (10.1/km^{2}). There were 7,037 housing units at an average density of 12.20 per square mile (4.7/km^{2}). The racial makeup of the county was 86.97% White, 0.68% African American, 0.51% Native American, 2.12% Asian, 0.00% Pacific Islander, 4.47% from some other races and 5.25% from two or more races. Hispanic or Latino people of any race were 9.74% of the population.

The median age was 42.8 years, with 23.1% of residents under the age of 18 and 21.1% of residents 65 years of age or older. For every 100 females there were 102.3 males, and for every 100 females age 18 and over there were 100.4 males age 18 and over.

50.6% of residents lived in urban areas, while 49.4% lived in rural areas.

There were 6,283 households in the county, of which 27.7% had children under the age of 18 living in them. Of all households, 50.8% were married-couple households, 20.0% were households with a male householder and no spouse or partner present, and 22.7% were households with a female householder and no spouse or partner present. About 30.2% of all households were made up of individuals and 14.2% had someone living alone who was 65 years of age or older.

There were 7,037 housing units, of which 10.7% were vacant. Among occupied housing units, 72.3% were owner-occupied and 27.7% were renter-occupied. The homeowner vacancy rate was 2.6% and the rental vacancy rate was 11.1%.

=== 2010 census ===
As of the 2010 census, there were 15,673 people, 6,540 households, and _ families residing in the county. The population density was 27.18 inhabitants per square mile (10.5/km^{2}). There were 7,219 housing units at an average density of 12.51 per square mile (4.8/km^{2}). The racial makeup of the county was 93.81% White, 0.32% African American, 0.21% Native American, 1.98% Asian, 0.00% Pacific Islander, 2.31% from some other races and 1.37% from two or more races. Hispanic or Latino people of any race were 4.99% of the population.

=== 2000 census ===
As of the 2000 census, there were 16,438 people, 6,692 households, and 4,597 families residing in the county. The population density was 28.50 inhabitants per square mile (11.0/km^{2}). There were 7,082 housing units at an average density of 12.28 per square mile (4.7/km^{2}). The racial makeup of the county was 96.71% White, 0.23% African American, 0.20% Native American, 1.46% Asian, 0.01% Pacific Islander, 0.61% from some other races and 0.78% from two or more races. Hispanic or Latino people of any race were 1.42% of the population.

There were 6,692 households, out of which 30.60% had children under the age of 18 living with them, 57.90% were married couples living together, 7.60% had a female householder with no husband present, and 31.30% were non-families. 27.50% of all households were made up of individuals, and 13.60% had someone living alone who was 65 years of age or older. The average household size was 2.43 and the average family size was 2.95.

In the county, the population was spread out, with 25.40% under the age of 18, 7.10% from 18 to 24, 27.10% from 25 to 44, 22.40% from 45 to 64, and 18.00% who were 65 years of age or older. The median age was 39 years. For every 100 females there were 98.00 males. For every 100 females age 18 and over, there were 94.80 males.

The median income for a household in the county was $38,658, and the median income for a family was $45,771. Males had a median income of $30,579 versus $23,595 for females. The per capita income for the county was $18,801. About 4.30% of families and 6.30% of the population were below the poverty line, including 7.70% of those under age 18 and 5.50% of those age 65 or over.

== Communities ==
=== Cities ===
- Blairsburg
- Ellsworth
- Jewell Junction
- Kamrar
- Randall
- Stanhope
- Stratford
- Webster City
- Williams

=== Unincorporated communities ===
- Homer

=== Townships ===
- Blairsburg
- Fremont
- Cass
- Williams
- Freedom
- Independence
- Rose Grove
- Webster
- Hamilton
- Lyon
- Lincoln
- Marion
- Clear Lake
- Ellsworth
- Scott
- Liberty

=== Population ranking ===
The population ranking of the following table is based on the 2020 census of Hamilton County.

† county seat

| Rank | City/Town/etc. | Municipal type | Population 2020 Census | Population 2024 Estimate |
|---|---|---|---|---|
| 1 | † Webster City | City | 7,825 | 7,763 |
| 2 | Jewell Junction | City | 1,216 | 1,234 |
| 3 | Stratford (partially in Webster County) | City | 707 | 688 |
| 4 | Ellsworth | City | 508 | 495 |
| 5 | Stanhope | City | 364 | 354 |
| 6 | Williams | City | 307 | 299 |
| 7 | Kamrar | City | 179 | 178 |
| 8 | Blairsburg | City | 176 | 175 |
| 9 | Randall | City | 154 | 156 |

== Politics ==
Hamilton County has been a swing county for most of its history. In the last 100 years, it has backed the losing candidate nationally only four times in the 1960, 1988, 2012 and 2020 presidential elections.

United States presidential election results for Hamilton County, Iowa
| Year | Republican | | Democratic | | Third party(ies) | |
| Year | No. | % | No. | % | No. | % |
|---|---|---|---|---|---|---|
| 1896 | 3,074 | 69.25% | 1,300 | 29.29% | 65 | 1.46% |
| 1900 | 3,259 | 73.15% | 1,134 | 25.45% | 62 | 1.39% |
| 1904 | 3,118 | 77.08% | 746 | 18.44% | 181 | 4.47% |
| 1908 | 2,765 | 68.17% | 1,145 | 28.23% | 146 | 3.60% |
| 1912 | 831 | 19.37% | 1,041 | 24.27% | 2,418 | 56.36% |
| 1916 | 3,037 | 70.94% | 1,125 | 26.28% | 119 | 2.78% |
| 1920 | 5,924 | 82.88% | 1,126 | 15.75% | 98 | 1.37% |
| 1924 | 4,401 | 60.74% | 490 | 6.76% | 2,355 | 32.50% |
| 1928 | 4,171 | 58.01% | 2,975 | 41.38% | 44 | 0.61% |
| 1932 | 2,330 | 30.56% | 5,191 | 68.09% | 103 | 1.35% |
| 1936 | 3,174 | 36.24% | 5,432 | 62.02% | 152 | 1.74% |
| 1940 | 4,183 | 44.03% | 5,279 | 55.56% | 39 | 0.41% |
| 1944 | 3,837 | 46.91% | 4,302 | 52.59% | 41 | 0.50% |
| 1948 | 3,535 | 48.13% | 3,613 | 49.19% | 197 | 2.68% |
| 1952 | 7,006 | 71.29% | 2,788 | 28.37% | 34 | 0.35% |
| 1956 | 5,667 | 59.56% | 3,829 | 40.25% | 18 | 0.19% |
| 1960 | 5,265 | 57.39% | 3,905 | 42.57% | 4 | 0.04% |
| 1964 | 3,127 | 37.53% | 5,195 | 62.35% | 10 | 0.12% |
| 1968 | 4,607 | 57.58% | 3,058 | 38.22% | 336 | 4.20% |
| 1972 | 4,803 | 60.87% | 2,913 | 36.92% | 174 | 2.21% |
| 1976 | 3,932 | 49.00% | 3,953 | 49.26% | 140 | 1.74% |
| 1980 | 4,745 | 57.40% | 2,741 | 33.16% | 780 | 9.44% |
| 1984 | 4,279 | 55.61% | 3,330 | 43.27% | 86 | 1.12% |
| 1988 | 3,277 | 43.73% | 4,156 | 55.46% | 61 | 0.81% |
| 1992 | 3,031 | 39.46% | 3,262 | 42.47% | 1,388 | 18.07% |
| 1996 | 3,109 | 42.72% | 3,455 | 47.48% | 713 | 9.80% |
| 2000 | 3,968 | 52.39% | 3,407 | 44.98% | 199 | 2.63% |
| 2004 | 4,367 | 52.39% | 3,895 | 46.73% | 73 | 0.88% |
| 2008 | 3,913 | 48.42% | 4,018 | 49.72% | 150 | 1.86% |
| 2012 | 3,991 | 50.35% | 3,782 | 47.71% | 154 | 1.94% |
| 2016 | 4,463 | 58.01% | 2,726 | 35.43% | 505 | 6.56% |
| 2020 | 4,956 | 62.39% | 2,843 | 35.79% | 144 | 1.81% |
| 2024 | 5,004 | 65.87% | 2,482 | 32.67% | 111 | 1.46% |

== Education ==
School districts include:

- Hubbard-Radcliffe Community School District - Established on July 1, 1993.
- Roland-Story Community School District - Established on July 1, 1969.
- South Hamilton Community School District
- Stratford Community School District
- Webster City Community School District

Former school districts:

- Northeast Hamilton Community School District - Merged into Webster City CSD on July 1, 2019.

== See also ==
- National Register of Historic Places listings in Hamilton County, Iowa
