= List of United States tornadoes in April 2015 =

This is a list of all tornadoes that were confirmed by local offices of the National Weather Service in the United States in April 2015.

== April ==
Confirmed tornadoes by Enhanced Fujita rating
EFU	EF0	EF1	EF2	EF3	EF4	EF5	Total
0	107	57	6	0	1	0	171

=== April 2 event ===
List of confirmed tornadoes – Thursday, April 2, 2015 (Note: All dates are based on the local time zone where the tornado touched down; however, all times are in Coordinated Universal Time for consistency.)
EF#	Location	County / Parish	State	Start Coord.	Time (UTC)	Path length	Max width	Damage (2015 USD)
EF0	NNW of Kit Carson	Cheyenne	CO	38.8235°N 102.8084°W	2350–2352	1 mi (1.6 km)	25 yd (23 m)	$0
EF0	Members of a fire department reported a brief tornado that caused no damage.							
EF0	WSW of Parsons	Labette	KS	37.321°N 95.343°W	0024 – 0025	0.04 mi (0.064 km)	50 yd (46 m)	$0
EF0	A brief tornado touchdown was observed over open country.							
EF0	W of Labette	Labette	KS	37.2268°N 95.2288°W	0040 – 0043	0.91 mi (1.46 km)	75 yd (69 m)	$0
EF0	A brief tornado touchdown was observed over open country.							
EF0	NNW of Hallowell	Cherokee	KS	37.1929°N 95.0333°W	0058 – 0103	2.48 mi (3.99 km)	100 yd (91 m)	$0
EF0	Minor damage to tree limbs was observed.							
EF0	SSE of Mound Valley	Labette	KS	37.1574°N 95.4061°W	0110 – 0112	0.1 mi (0.16 km)	50 yd (46 m)	$5,000
EF0	A small shed was damaged.							
EF0	N of New Carlisle	Clark	OH	39.9752°N 84.0358°W	0131 – 0132	0.13 mi (0.21 km)	120 yd (110 m)	$1,000
EF0	Several trees were snapped, and portions of a barn roof and doors were blown off at a residence. A farmhouse on the property sustained minor gutter and siding damage, with a portion of a small tree limb speared into one of its exterior walls.							
EF0	SW of Golden City	Barton	MO	37.3599°N 94.1732°W	0133 – 0134	2.57 mi (4.14 km)	100 yd (91 m)	$5,000
EF0	Trees were damaged and a hay barn was destroyed.							
EF0	SE of Webb City	Jasper	MO	37.1192°N 94.4233°W	0209 – 0210	0.12 mi (0.19 km)	75 yd (69 m)	$10,000
EF0	A brief tornado caused damage to the roof, siding, and gutters of a single-family home. Two outbuildings were destroyed, and several hardwood trees suffered significant damage.							
EF1	S of Afton to NE of Bernice	Craig, Ottawa, Delaware	OK	36.7045°N 95.0953°W	0259 – 0319	12.3 mi (19.8 km)	800 yd (730 m)	$275,000
EF1	Numerous barns and outbuildings were damaged or destroyed. Two tractor trailers were blown over, round hay bales were blown across a field, numerous trees were snapped or uprooted, and several homes were damaged. A private boat dock was destroyed.							
EF1	SE of Pineville to W of Seligman	McDonald, Barry	MO	36.53°N 94.18°W	0425 – 0440	12.39 mi (19.94 km)	100 yd (91 m)	$20,000
EF1	A house, a barn, and a pontoon boat were damaged. Numerous trees were downed.							

=== April 3 event ===
List of confirmed tornadoes – Friday, April 3, 2015
EF#	Location	County / Parish	State	Start Coord.	Time (UTC)	Path length	Max width	Damage (2015 USD)
EF1	S of Vanzant	Douglas	MO	36.9732°N 92.3045°W	0526–0529	0.92 mi (1.48 km)	100 yd (91 m)	$15,000
EF1	Several outbuildings were damaged, and numerous trees and power lines were downed.							
EF1	N of Harrison	Boone	AR	36.347°N 93.2498°W	0540–0550	6.9 mi (11.1 km)	300 yd (270 m)	$500,000
EF1	Numerous trees were snapped or uprooted. Several buildings on a ranch and some chicken houses were damaged.							
EF2	N of Pomona	Howell	MO	36.91°N 91.93°W	0552–0603	7.61 mi (12.25 km)	440 yd (400 m)	$600,000
EF2	Two well-built houses and three trailer homes were destroyed, and nine barns, two shops, and two public buildings were damaged. Numerous trees and power lines were downed.							
EF0	Rural Labette County	Labette	KS	37.036°N 95.145°W	0717–0718	0.03 mi (0.048 km)	50 yd (46 m)	$0
EF0	A trained storm spotter observed a brief tornado over open country.							
EF0	Kingfield to W of Franklin	Williamson	TN	35.9154°N 87.0422°W	2222–2230	5.6 mi (9.0 km)	75 yd (69 m)	$20,000
EF0	A carport was blown down a hillside, several homes and outbuildings sustained varying degrees of roof damage, and numerous trees were downed.							
EF0	Fyffe	DeKalb	AL	34.4609°N 86.0164°W	0115–0116	0.93 mi (1.50 km)	30 yd (27 m)	Unknown
EF0	Several trees were uprooted, and a large hay barn was destroyed.							
EF1	NE of Ider	DeKalb	AL	34.7437°N 85.6186°W	0205–0208	2.29 mi (3.69 km)	75 yd (69 m)	Unknown
EF1	Numerous homes and other buildings sustained minor to moderate roof and structural damage, although one home had nearly its entire roof removed. A small outbuilding was damaged, and an anchored outbuilding was destroyed as well. Many trees were downed, and a power pole was snapped.							
EF1	S of Rising Fawn	Dade	GA	34.7332°N 85.5388°W	0210–0211	0.11 mi (0.18 km)	30 yd (27 m)	$5,000
EF1	A brief tornado moved across Interstate 59, uprooting a tree and knocking down multiple large tree limbs. A few residences sustained shingle and siding damage.							

=== April 7 event ===
List of confirmed tornadoes – Tuesday, April 7, 2015
EF#	Location	County / Parish	State	Start Coord.	Time (UTC)	Path length	Max width	Damage (2015 USD)
EF1	N of Darmstadt	Vanderburgh, Warrick	IN	38.155°N 87.58°W	1920–1933	9.56 mi (15.39 km)	500 yd (460 m)	$430,000
EF1	Many trees were snapped or uprooted, and power poles were downed. At least three farm machinery sheds and garages, as well as three grain bins were destroyed, while several other small structures were overturned or destroyed. A home sustained major structural damage, with its exterior walls pushed outward from its foundation. Dozens of homes sustained partial shingle loss or had their gutters or fascia blown off.							
EF1	SW of Tennyson	Warrick	IN	38.0442°N 87.1655°W	1947–1950	1.5 mi (2.4 km)	300 yd (270 m)	$100,000
EF1	A barn was destroyed while several others sustained major roof damage. Several trees were felled, and the roof was removed from a garage.							
EF1	E of Tennyson	Warrick, Spencer	IN	38.08°N 87.0924°W	1954–2000	3.49 mi (5.62 km)	200 yd (180 m)	$12,000
EF1	Numerous trees were snapped or uprooted.							
EF1	N of Branchville	Perry	IN	38.1907°N 86.6108°W	2027–2030	2.6 mi (4.2 km)	100 yd (91 m)	$5,000
EF1	Several dozen trees were snapped or uprooted.							
EF0	S of Richmond	Madison	KY	37.66°N 84.29°W	2257–2258	0.6 mi (0.97 km)	35 yd (32 m)	$60,000
EF0	Three outbuildings were impacted, two completely destroyed and the other pushed off its foundation. Roof damage was observed on two homes, and several trees were snapped.							
EF1	SE of Blue Grass Army Depot	Madison	KY	37.66°N 84.18°W	2303–2306	2 mi (3.2 km)	215 yd (197 m)	$15,000
EF1	Several trees were snapped or uprooted, and a residence sustained minor shingle and porch damage.							
EF0	NE of Neodesha	Wilson	KS	37.47°N 95.62°W	0205–0207	0.05 mi (0.080 km)	50 yd (46 m)	$0
EF0	The public reported a brief tornado over open country.							
EF0	SE of Amoret	Bates	MO	38.238°N 94.511°W	0253–0254	0.55 mi (0.89 km)	20 yd (18 m)	$10,000
EF0	A machine shop was destroyed, and shingles were removed from a house garage.							
EF0	NE of Neodesha	Montgomery	KS	37.3412°N 95.5905°W	0359–0400	0.03 mi (0.048 km)	50 yd (46 m)	$0
EF0	A storm chaser reported a brief tornado over open country.							

=== April 8 event ===
List of confirmed tornadoes – Wednesday, April 8, 2015
EF#	Location	County / Parish	State	Start Coord.	Time (UTC)	Path length	Max width	Damage (2015 USD)
EF1	Potosi	Washington	MO	37.9446°N 90.7992°W	2020–2038	4.1 mi (6.6 km)	300 yd (270 m)	$0
EF1	Several churches and businesses sustained roof damage, and trees, power lines, and business signs were downed throughout the town. A mobile home used for storage along with a building at a saw mill were destroyed.							
EF0	E of Buttermilk	Comanche	KS	37.1188°N 99.1697°W	2324–2327	1.91 mi (3.07 km)	75 yd (69 m)	$0
EF0	A storm chaser observed a tornado with intermittent contact with the ground.							
EF0	NNE of Aetna	Barber	KS	37.1914°N 98.9503°W	2349–0003	16.24 mi (26.14 km)	250 yd (230 m)	$0
EF0	A large cone tornado remained mainly over open country, causing only tree damage.							
EF0	S of Lake City	Barber	KS	37.2559°N 98.8022°W	0115–0116	0.57 mi (0.92 km)	50 yd (46 m)	$0
EF0	A trained storm spotter observed a brief tornado.							
EF0	N of Garden Plain	Sedgwick	KS	37.71°N 97.60°W	0132 – 0140	2.27 mi (3.65 km)	75 yd (69 m)	$0
EF0	A brief rope tornado damaged the roof of a barn.							
EF0	Rural Reno County	Reno	KS	37.7427°N 97.699°W	0140–0142	0.82 mi (1.32 km)	75 yd (69 m)	$0
EF0	A portion of a barn roof was ripped off and tossed into a field. A pontoon boat was pushed from one property onto the adjacent property.							
EF0	SW of Zenda	Kingman	KS	37.7376°N 98.1793°W	0143–0146	0.73 mi (1.17 km)	70 yd (64 m)	$0
EF0	A storm chaser reported a tornado over open country.							
EF0	NE of Hammon	Custer	OK	35.653°N 99.312°W	0158	0.2 mi (0.32 km)	30 yd (27 m)	$0
EF0	Brief tornado remained over open country, causing no damage.							

=== April 9 event ===
List of confirmed tornadoes – Thursday, April 9, 2015
EF#	Location	County / Parish	State	Start Coord.	Time (UTC)	Path length	Max width	Damage (2015 USD)
EF0	SE of Akron	Peoria	IL	40.8716°N 89.6204°W	1832–1833	0.15 mi (0.24 km)	10 yd (9.1 m)	$0
EF0	An emergency manager reported a brief tornado in an open field.							
EF1	W of Maysville to SE of DeWitt	Scott, Clinton	IA	41.6353°N 90.8953°W	2204–2230	22.38 mi (36.02 km)	100 yd (91 m)	$20,000
EF1	Mainly farm outbuildings and trees were damaged. A gas station sign was blown over, and a grain bin was thrown into a field. Homes sustained minor roof, siding, and porch damage.							
EF0	N of Moscow	Hillsdale	MI	42.0634°N 84.4987°W	2222–2224	0.6 mi (0.97 km)	70 yd (64 m)	$0
EF0	A residence suffered minor window and structural damage. A barn on a farm was essentially destroyed, a center pivot was flipped, and trees were damaged.							
EF1	Clinton to NE of Fulton	Clinton, Whiteside	IA, IL	41.8128°N 90.3156°W	2240–2300	12.47 mi (20.07 km)	75 yd (69 m)	$0
EF1	Rental storage buildings and a garage were destroyed. A few residences sustained minor roof damage, and farm outbuildings and trees were damaged.							
EF1	NE of Fulton	Whiteside, Carroll	IL	41.9233°N 90.0757°W	2302–2315	8.3 mi (13.4 km)	50 yd (46 m)	$0
EF1	Trees and outbuildings were damaged, one of which was lifted into power lines and destroyed. A tractor trailer was flipped.							
EF0	S of Cherry Valley	Winnebago, Boone	IL	42.1926°N 88.9548°W	2337–2340	2.84 mi (4.57 km)	25 yd (23 m)	$0
EF0	The tornado was photographed by trained spotters and emergency management; no damage was reported.							
EF2	NE of Mount Selman	Cherokee	TX	32.0888°N 95.2289°W	2338–2345	1.77 mi (2.85 km)	340 yd (310 m)	$300,000
EF2	Numerous trees were snapped or uprooted. The roof was removed from one outbuilding, and a second outbuilding was overturned. A house sustained minor damage to its roof and gutters, while a second residence had its roof torn off and a few exterior walls collapsed.							
EF4	NNE of Franklin Grove to NNW of Kirkland	Lee, Ogle, DeKalb, Boone	IL	41.853°N 89.2896°W	2339–0020	30.14 mi (48.51 km)	700 yd (0.64 km)	$19,000,000
EF4	2 deaths – See the article on this tornado – A very high-end, long-tracked EF4 tornado caused significant to catastrophic damage, most notably around Rochelle and in Fairdale.							
EF0	ENE of Lindenwood	Ogle	IL	42.0583°N 88.9752°W	0005–0008	1.86 mi (2.99 km)	100 yd (91 m)	$0
EF0	An aerial damage survey confirmed a satellite tornado to the Rochelle–Fairdale tornado.							
EF1	NE of Longview	Gregg	TX	32.5179°N 94.7316°W	0010–0015	1.31 mi (2.11 km)	335 yd (306 m)	$1,000,000
EF1	A nursing home sustained roof damage. A nearby mobile home park sustained damage, houses sustained minor to moderate damage, and three mobile homes were completely destroyed by fallen trees. The roof was ripped off a church.							
EF1	NW of Kirkland	DeKalb, Boone	IL	42.1334°N 88.8776°W	0015–0021	4.01 mi (6.45 km)	100 yd (91 m)	$80,000
EF1	Three barns were destroyed and two small outbuildings sustained heavy damage.							
EF1	NW of Hallsville	Harrison	TX	32.5465°N 94.6734°W	0020–0032	4.52 mi (7.27 km)	760 yd (690 m)	$300,000
EF1	A significant portion of roofing in addition to HVAC equipment was removed from a warehouse building, and several houses sustained various degrees of damage. The wall of an outbuilding collapsed, while a second outbuilding lost a majority of its roofing. A mobile home was shifted off its foundation, while a second one had its roof removed and walls collapsed. Numerous trees were snapped or uprooted.							
EF0	S of Belvidere	Boone	IL	42.202°N 88.8465°W	0024–0025	0.42 mi (0.68 km)	30 yd (27 m)	$20,000
EF0	A satellite tornado to the EF4 Rochelle–Fairdale tornado heavily damaged a small zoo, killing four animals, and collapsed the walls of several outbuildings and small barns. Large softwood trees were snapped.							
EF1	SE of Belvidere	Boone	IL	42.1942°N 88.7748°W	0025–0031	3.92 mi (6.31 km)	50 yd (46 m)	$150,000
EF1	A detached garage was destroyed, the roof was ripped off a house, and several hardwood trees were snapped.							
EF0	SSE of Tovey	Christian	IL	39.5539°N 89.4361°W	0047–0048	0.14 mi (0.23 km)	10 yd (9.1 m)	$0
EF0	An emergency manager reported a brief tornado in an open field.							
EF1	ESE of Harvard	McHenry	IL	42.3982°N 88.5309°W	0050–0051	0.32 mi (0.51 km)	30 yd (27 m)	$0
EF1	Six to seven trees were uprooted, one of which landed on a house and caused roof damage. An antenna was blown off the roof as well.							
EF0	NW of Butler	Custer	OK	35.6809°N 99.2404°W	0208	0.2 mi (0.32 km)	30 yd (27 m)	$0
EF0	Trained storm spotters reported a brief tornado.							
EF0	N of Daisy	Cape Girardeau	MO	37.5251°N 89.8065°W	0216–0218	1.75 mi (2.82 km)	150 yd (140 m)	$6,000
EF0	Numerous trees and tree limbs were downed.							
EF0	W of Jackson	Cape Girardeau	MO	37.38°N 89.7246°W	0231–0233	1.7 mi (2.7 km)	130 yd (120 m)	$60,000
EF0	Approximately 12 houses had partial shingle loss or minor damage to gutters and fascia. Several mainly small trees or tree limbs were downed.							

=== April 11 event ===
List of confirmed tornadoes – Saturday, April 11, 2015
EF#	Location	County / Parish	State	Start Coord.	Time (UTC)	Path length	Max width	Damage (2015 USD)
EF0	SW of Fritch	Potter	TX	35.539°N 101.692°W	2336–2342	2.84 mi (4.57 km)	30 yd (27 m)	$0
EF0	A tornado was confirmed via storm chaser photographs.							
EF0	W of Moscow	Stevens	KS	37.33°N 101.44°W	0106–0108	0.52 mi (0.84 km)	50 yd (46 m)	$0
EF0	A trained storm spotter reported a brief tornado.							

=== April 12 event ===
List of confirmed tornadoes – Sunday, April 12, 2015
EF#	Location	County / Parish	State	Start Coord.	Time (UTC)	Path length	Max width	Damage (2015 USD)
EF0	N of Smith Center	Smith	KS	39.8248°N 98.7839°W	2346–2348	1.12 mi (1.80 km)	20 yd (18 m)	$20,000
EF0	The roof of an outbuilding was peeled back.							
EF0	N of Sharon	Barber	KS	37.3723°N 98.4181°W	0118–0120	0.5 mi (0.80 km)	75 yd (69 m)	$0
EF0	A storm chaser reported a brief tornado.							

=== April 13 event ===
List of confirmed tornadoes – Monday, April 13, 2015
EF#	Location	County / Parish	State	Start Coord.	Time (UTC)	Path length	Max width	Damage (2015 USD)
EF2	ESE of Winfield	Titus	TX	33.1602°N 95.0703°W	1854–1856	0.06 mi (0.097 km)	19 yd (17 m)	$100,000
EF2	Several vehicles were tossed, damaged, or destroyed. Two metal trash dumpsters were lofted, one of which was found 150 yd (140 m) away on the roof of a warehouse that was partially destroyed. The other was smashed into a pickup truck, which had one side crushed in by the impact.							
EF0	N of Terry	Hinds	MS	32.1314°N 90.3847°W	0011–0025	6.09 mi (9.80 km)	25 yd (23 m)	$7,000
EF0	A weak tornado uprooted several trees and caused minor fencing and roof damage.							
EF1	W of Harperville	Scott	MS	32.5063°N 89.5852°W	0046–0047	0.55 mi (0.89 km)	100 yd (91 m)	$10,000
EF1	Trees were felled or snapped, the roof was blown off a barn, and a home sustained minor roof damage.							
EF0	E of Walnut Grove	Leake	MS	32.5926°N 89.4563°W	0105–0107	1.15 mi (1.85 km)	50 yd (46 m)	$11,000
EF0	Trees were felled and a fence was blown down. A chicken house and a shed lost portions of their roofs.							

=== April 14 event ===
List of confirmed tornadoes – Tuesday, April 14, 2015
EF#	Location	County / Parish	State	Start Coord.	Time (UTC)	Path length	Max width	Damage (2015 USD)
EF0	SE of Eugene	Lane	OR	44.05°N 123.11°W	2305	0.1 mi (0.16 km)	20 yd (18 m)	$25,000
EF0	A brief tornado touched down at Lane Community College, severely damaging three vehicles; one car was moved 25 ft (7.6 m) and flipped upside down on a berm in a parking lot.							

=== April 16 event ===
List of confirmed tornadoes – Thursday, April 16, 2015
EF#	Location	County / Parish	State	Start Coord.	Time (UTC)	Path length	Max width	Damage (2015 USD)
EF0	WNW of Refugio	Refugio	TX	28.31°N 97.32°W	1916–1917	0.01 mi (0.016 km)	10 yd (9.1 m)	$0
EF0	A trained storm spotter reported a brief rope tornado.							
EF0	Quintana	Brazoria	TX	28.3482°N 97.1473°W	1951–1952	0.11 mi (0.18 km)	50 yd (46 m)	$5,000
EF0	Several large tree limbs were snapped, and six utility poles were damaged.							
EF0	SSW of Tivoli	Refugio	TX	28.4269°N 96.8994°W	2031–2032	0.11 mi (0.18 km)	50 yd (46 m)	$5,000
EF0	Several utility poles were damaged.							
EF0	N of Claude	Carson	TX	35.22°N 101.34°W	2058–2103	2.25 mi (3.62 km)	50 yd (46 m)	$0
EF0	A non-mesocyclonic tornado caused minor telephone pole damage.							
EF0	ENE of Groom	Gray	TX	35.239°N 101.01°W	2158–2204	2.34 mi (3.77 km)	30 yd (27 m)	$0
EF0	A weak tornado caused minor tree damage.							
EF0	NE of Briscoe	Hemphill	TX	35.649°N 100.228°W	2220–2251	7.17 mi (11.54 km)	75 yd (69 m)	$0
EF0	A tornado was well-videoed; no damage was reported.							
EF0	NE of Pampa	Roberts	TX	35.622°N 101.667°W	2235–2244	4.38 mi (7.05 km)	50 yd (46 m)	$0
EF0	A tornado was well photographed.							
EF0	NW of Syracuse	Hamilton	KS	38.1504°N 101.7323°W	2318–2319	0.37 mi (0.60 km)	30 yd (27 m)	$0
EF0	A storm chaser observed a brief tornado.							
EF0	WSW of Wheeler	Wheeler	TX	35.362°N 100.629°W	2320–2355	14.05 mi (22.61 km)	50 yd (46 m)	$0
EF0	Trees were uprooted with numerous branches snapped, and an old outbuilding was destroyed.							
EF0	E of Briscoe	Wheeler	TX	35.585°N 101.21°W	2322–2335	4.92 mi (7.92 km)	70 yd (64 m)	$0
EF0	Power poles were damaged.							
EF0	N of Syracuse	Hamilton	KS	38.2099°N 101.6955°W	0000–0005	1.57 mi (2.53 km)	50 yd (46 m)	$0
EF0	A storm chaser reported a tornado over open areas.							
EF0	E of Erick	Beckham	OK	35.207°N 99.77°W	0100–0115	4.5 mi (7.2 km)	150 yd (140 m)	$0
EF0	Some trees were damaged.							

=== April 17 event ===
List of confirmed tornadoes – Friday, April 17, 2015
EF#	Location	County / Parish	State	Start Coord.	Time (UTC)	Path length	Max width	Damage (2015 USD)
EF0	WSW of Yuma	Yuma	CO	40.11°N 102.74°W	2118–2120	0.25 mi (0.40 km)	25 yd (23 m)	$0
EF0	A trained storm spotter reported a landspout tornado.							
EF0	NNW of Kalvesta	Finney	KS	38.2°N 100.4°W	2313–2314	0.38 mi (0.61 km)	30 yd (27 m)	$0
EF0	A storm chaser reported a brief tornado.							
EF0	NNE of Yuma	Yuma	CO	40.34°N 102.53°W	2347–2350	0.5 mi (0.80 km)	25 yd (23 m)	$0
EF0	A trained storm spotter reported a rope tornado.							
EF0	SSE of Edson	Sherman	KS	39.17°N 101.5°W	2355–0000	1.5 mi (2.4 km)	50 yd (46 m)	$0
EF0	A storm chaser reported a tornado; its location was approximated using radar.							

=== April 18 event ===
List of confirmed tornadoes – Saturday, April 18, 2015
EF#	Location	County / Parish	State	Start Coord.	Time (UTC)	Path length	Max width	Damage (2015 USD)
EF0	SE of Sterling	Washington	CO	40.09°N 102.88°W	1940	0.1 mi (0.16 km)	50 yd (46 m)	$0
EF0	A trained storm spotter reported a tornado over open country.							
EF1	S of Dacoma	Woods	OK	36.549°N 98.581°W	2106	0.5 mi (0.80 km)	40 yd (37 m)	$0
EF1	A metal barn at a ranch was damaged and trees were snapped.							
EF0	SE of Magee	Simpson	MS	31.86°N 89.72°W	2308	0.01 mi (0.016 km)	25 yd (23 m)	$0
EF0	A trained storm spotter reported a brief tornado.							
EF0	NNE of Lake Granbury	Hood	TX	32.5124°N 97.8082°W	2347–2348	0.54 mi (0.87 km)	30 yd (27 m)	$0
EF0	Amateur radio operators reported a brief tornado.							

=== April 19 event ===
List of confirmed tornadoes – Sunday, April 19, 2015
EF#	Location	County / Parish	State	Start Coord.	Time (UTC)	Path length	Max width	Damage (2015 USD)
EF1	Southern DeRidder	Beauregard	LA	30.838°N 93.2902°W	0655–0657	1.43 mi (2.30 km)	50 yd (46 m)	$5,000
EF1	Multiple tree branches were snapped, two elevated signs were damaged, and portions of roofing was removed from several small retail buildings.							
EF1	ENE of Union Springs	Bullock	AL	32.159°N 85.6291°W	1219–1221	1.15 mi (1.85 km)	150 yd (140 m)	$0
EF1	Numerous trees were snapped or uprooted.							
EF0	E of Freeport	Walton	FL	30.48°N 86.03°W	1322–1325	0.33 mi (0.53 km)	25 yd (23 m)	$0
EF0	A debris signature was evident on radar; damage was likely confined to trees.							
EF0	E of Freeport	Walton	FL	30.49°N 85.95°W	1325–1326	0.3 mi (0.48 km)	25 yd (23 m)	$2,000
EF0	Trees and power lines were downed.							
EF0	N of Leesburg	Cherokee	AL	34.183°N 85.7777°W	1338–1343	3.52 mi (5.66 km)	200 yd (180 m)	$0
EF0	Multiple trees were snapped or uprooted; one fallen tree caused substantial damage to a residence and vehicle while a second destroyed a barn. A residence sustained minor porch and siding damage.							
EF1	W of Glenville	Russell	AL	32.1307°N 85.2295°W	1343–1345	0.44 mi (0.71 km)	188 yd (172 m)	$0
EF1	Numerous trees were snapped or uprooted before the tornado moved into inaccessible land areas.							
EF1	SW of Abbeville	Henry	AL	31.5135°N 85.3112°W	1346–1353	2.1 mi (3.4 km)	300 yd (270 m)	$1,000,000
EF1	Eight railroad cars were flipped off their tracks; otherwise, damage was confined to trees.							
EF1	N of Holy Trinity to ESE of Fort Benning	Russell, Chattahoochee	AL, GA	32.2689°N 85.0041°W	1417–1433	7.61 mi (12.25 km)	425 yd (389 m)	$10,000
EF1	The tornado caused structural damage to several businesses, including a metal building that lost its roof and had its rooftop air conditioning units tossed. Numerous residences sustained mainly roof and siding damage.							
EF1	N of Campbellton to SE of Blakely	Jackson (FL), Houston (AL), Early (GA)	FL, AL, GA	30.98°N 85.41°W	1447–1538	38.71 mi (62.30 km)	500 yd (460 m)	$155,000
EF1	Numerous trees were snapped or uprooted; a fallen tree caused substantial damage to a house. A large metal outbuilding was destroyed, with some debris removed from the foundation. Other structures had roofing material removed.							
EF1	W of Leslie	Sumter	GA	31.9643°N 84.1736°W	1538–1540	1.46 mi (2.35 km)	100 yd (91 m)	$50,000
EF1	Four large grain silos were completely destroyed with debris thrown approximately 0.25 mi (440 yd) into a nearby field, nearly metal buildings had two doors blown out, and 30 to 40 trees were snapped or uprooted.							
EF1	N of Tallahassee	Leon	FL	30.4981°N 84.3136°W	1651–1659	4.62 mi (7.44 km)	350 yd (320 m)	$40,000
EF1	Sporadic tree damage was observed, a fence was damaged, and a vehicle was crushed by a fallen tree.							
EF1	WSW of Dexter to WSW of Dublin	Laurens	GA	32.406°N 83.1281°W	1723–1738	11.57 mi (18.62 km)	300 yd (270 m)	$75,000
EF1	Approximately 200-300 trees were downed, and metal roofs were ripped off a barn and a storage shed.							
EF0	W of Douglas	Coffee	GA	31.5147°N 82.961°W	1801–1805	3.91 mi (6.29 km)	60 yd (55 m)	$20,000
EF0	A house sustained siding damage and several others sustained minor roof damage. Trees were pushed over, tree limbs were snapped, and small farm outbuildings had wood and metal panels removed.							
EF2	ESE of Hephzibah	Burke, Richmond	GA	33.2181°N 81.9498°W	1942–1949	4.68 mi (7.53 km)	200 yd (180 m)	Unknown
EF2	Several homes were damaged, a fifth wheel travel trailer was overturned and severely damaged, and several trees were snapped or uprooted.							
EF2	Southern Aiken	Aiken	SC	33.481°N 81.7618°W	2010–2036	19.54 mi (31.45 km)	660 yd (600 m)	Unknown
EF2	Numerous trees and many homes, vehicles, and other structures were damaged.							
EF0	NNW of Trenton	Edgefield	SC	33.7905°N 81.8643°W	2021–2028	2.86 mi (4.60 km)	50 yd (46 m)	$5,000
EF0	A tree inflicted minor damage to a home upon falling.							
EF1	N of Mayo	Suwannee	FL	30.1247°N 83.1807°W	2030–2033	3.63 mi (5.84 km)	60 yd (55 m)	Unknown
EF1	Extensive tree damage was observed; metal sheeting was lofted into tree tops.							
EF1	NNE of Gilbert	Lexington	SC	34.0192°N 81.3603°W	2115–2128	9.55 mi (15.37 km)	200 yd (180 m)	Unknown
EF1	Numerous trees were downed on the south side of Lake Murray, some of which fell on homes. A pontoon boat was lifted out of the water and deposited sideways on the end of a dock.							
EF1	WNW of St. Matthews	Calhoun	SC	33.6978°N 80.9298°W	2120–2123	0.26 mi (0.42 km)	200 yd (180 m)	$200,000
EF1	A single-wide mobile home was completely destroyed, injuring the two occupants, and significant tree damage was observed. Seven homes and six sheds or outbuildings were damaged.							
EF1	NE of Morrilton	Conway	AR	35.2244°N 92.6929°W	2235–2240	4.21 mi (6.78 km)	300 yd (270 m)	$50,000
EF1	Trees were snapped or downed, and minor damage was inflicted to outbuildings and chicken houses.							
EF0	SW of Lamar	Darlington	SC	34.1356°N 80.1172°W	2234–2235	0.46 mi (0.74 km)	75 yd (69 m)	$32,000
EF0	Two chicken houses were damaged and another was partially destroyed, with sheet metal found 1.75 mi (2.82 km) away in a field. Numerous trees were snapped or downed, in turn toppling a power pole and power line.							
EF0	Kettering	Montgomery	OH	39.6699°N 84.1171°W	0256–0258	0.86 mi (1.38 km)	75 yd (69 m)	$5,000
EF0	Trees were snapped or uprooted.							

=== April 20 event ===
List of confirmed tornadoes – Monday, April 20, 2015
EF#	Location	County / Parish	State	Start Coord.	Time (UTC)	Path length	Max width	Damage (2015 USD)
EF0	S of Pisgah	Limestone	AL	34.87°N 86.83°W	0645–0646	0.76 mi (1.22 km)	100 yd (91 m)	Unknown
EF0	Several pine trees were snapped or uprooted, one of which fell onto a home.							
EF1	SW of Ocala	Marion	FL	29.0609°N 82.2713°W	1931–1935	1.94 mi (3.12 km)	350 yd (320 m)	Unknown
EF1	Significant roof and tree damage occurred.							
EF0	Potter Township	Centre	PA	40.7891°N 77.6795°W	2355–2356	0.96 mi (1.54 km)	40 yd (37 m)	$5,000
EF0	A brief tornado caused sporadic tree damage and damaged the roof of one barn.							

=== April 21 event ===
List of confirmed tornadoes – Tuesday, April 21, 2015
EF#	Location	County / Parish	State	Start Coord.	Time (UTC)	Path length	Max width	Damage (2015 USD)
EF0	N of Desert Center	Riverside	CA	33.8°N 115.4°W	2250–2305	10 mi (16 km)	200 yd (180 m)	$5,000
EF0	A number of solar panels were destroyed, and several windshields were broken from flying rocks.							

=== April 22 event ===
List of confirmed tornadoes – Wednesday, April 22, 2015
EF#	Location	County / Parish	State	Start Coord.	Time (UTC)	Path length	Max width	Damage (2015 USD)
EF0	SE of Snyder	Scurry	TX	32.54°N 100.68°W	2318–2322	0.01 mi (0.016 km)	50 yd (46 m)	$0
EF0	The public reported a landspout tornado via social media.							
EF0	NNW of Wastella	Nolan	TX	32.5232°N 100.6628°W	2320–2324	0.09 mi (0.14 km)	30 yd (27 m)	$0
EF0	A resident videoed a landspout tornado.							
EF0	WNW of Aiken	Floyd	TX	34.14°N 101.56°W	0053–0054	0.09 mi (0.14 km)	50 yd (46 m)	$0
EF0	Several trained storm spotters observed a tornado over open land.							
EF0	NW of Knox City	Knox	TX	33.4814°N 99.8936°W	0250	0.2 mi (0.32 km)	30 yd (27 m)	$0
EF0	Emergency management reported a brief tornado.							

=== April 23 event ===
List of confirmed tornadoes – Thursday, April 23, 2015
EF#	Location	County / Parish	State	Start Coord.	Time (UTC)	Path length	Max width	Damage (2015 USD)
EF0	NNW of Belle Glade	Palm Beach	FL	26.7453°N 80.6987°W	1844–1847	0.4 mi (0.64 km)	10 yd (9.1 m)	$0
EF0	A waterspout moved ashore but caused no damage.							
EF1	NNE of Haxtun	Sedgwick	CO	40.8229°N 102.4669°W	2351	0.1 mi (0.16 km)	60 yd (55 m)	$25,000
EF1	A grain bin was destroyed and a power pole was downed.							
EF0	ENE of Barbers Point	Honolulu	HI	21.3231°N 158.0498°W	0056–0110	1 mi (1.6 km)	10 yd (9.1 m)	$0
EF0	A brief landspout tornado caused no damage.							

=== April 24 event ===
List of confirmed tornadoes – Friday, April 24, 2015
EF#	Location	County / Parish	State	Start Coord.	Time (UTC)	Path length	Max width	Damage (2015 USD)
EF1	W of Kirbyville to E of Call	Jasper, Newton	TX	30.6647°N 94.0114°W	1658–1718	13.27 mi (21.36 km)	50 yd (46 m)	$75,000
EF1	Numerous trees were snapped or uprooted; resultant debris damaged a few homes. Some outbuildings were also damaged.							
EF1	SE of Call to NW of Fields	Newton, Beauregard	TX, LA	30.5763°N 93.7917°W	1720–1732	12.3 mi (19.8 km)	50 yd (46 m)	$10,000
EF1	Numerous trees were snapped or uprooted, one of which damaged a home upon falling. A couple of outbuildings were also damaged.							
EF1	W of Novice	Runnels, Coleman	TX	31.9865°N 99.7777°W	2037–2048	8.42 mi (13.55 km)	350 yd (320 m)	$0
EF1	Trees were snapped or uprooted.							
EF0	W of Donaldsonville	Iberville	LA	30.07°N 91.28°W	2135–2136	0.2 mi (0.32 km)	30 yd (27 m)	$50,000
EF0	One mobile home was overturned and several others were damaged.							
EF0	NE of Hays	Ellis	KS	39.0208°N 99.1678°W	2156–2157	0.48 mi (0.77 km)	50 yd (46 m)	$0
EF0	A storm chaser reported a brief tornado.							
EF0	NNE of Emmeram	Ellis	KS	39.0184°N 99.1133°W	2200–2202	0.79 mi (1.27 km)	50 yd (46 m)	$0
EF0	A storm chaser reported a brief tornado.							
EF0	NE of Emmeram	Ellis	KS	39.0223°N 99.1092°W	2202–2208	3.02 mi (4.86 km)	100 yd (91 m)	$0
EF0	A storm chaser reported a brief tornado.							
EF0	NE of Emmeram	Wichita, Scott	KS	38.346°N 101.196°W	2209–2234	5.32 mi (8.56 km)	75 yd (69 m)	$0
EF0	The first of four simultaneous landspout tornadoes was reported by a storm chaser.							
EF0	SW of Paradise	Russell	KS	39.07°N 98.97°W	2214–2215	0.18 mi (0.29 km)	40 yd (37 m)	$0
EF0	Law enforcement reported a brief tornado.							
EF0	SW of Scott City	Scott	KS	38.31°N 101.12°W	2228–2235	0.5 mi (0.80 km)	75 yd (69 m)	$0
EF0	The second of four simultaneous landspout tornadoes was reported by a trained storm spotter.							
EF0	Scott County	Scott	KS	38.3866°N 101.0576°W	2229–2237	0.79 mi (1.27 km)	75 yd (69 m)	$0
EF0	The third of four simultaneous landspout tornadoes was reported by a trained storm spotter.							
EF0	Scott County	Scott	KS	38.436°N 100.9783°W	2234–2241	0.88 mi (1.42 km)	75 yd (69 m)	$0
EF0	The final of four simultaneous landspout tornadoes was reported by a trained storm spotter.							
EF0	SSE of Aledo	Parker	TX	32.6374°N 97.5775°W	2313–2314	0.98 mi (1.58 km)	40 yd (37 m)	$1,000
EF0	Minimal damage to trees and power lines was inflicted.							
EF1	WSW of Sylvan Grove	Lincoln	KS	39.0145°N 98.4014°W	2338–2340	0.2 mi (0.32 km)	40 yd (37 m)	Unknown
EF1	A large portion of the roof was peeled off a high school, and a press box at an associated football stadium was destroyed.							
EF0	SSE of Midlothian	Ellis	TX	32.4481°N 96.9599°W	2352–2353	1 mi (1.6 km)	60 yd (55 m)	$5,000
EF0	A few trees, power lines, and power poles were damaged.							
EF0	SW of Crystal City	Zavala	TX	28.6411°N 99.8698°W	0048–0053	1.27 mi (2.04 km)	50 yd (46 m)	$5,000
EF0	An irrigation pivot was overturned and an outbuilding sustained minor damage.							
EF1	WSW of Gilmer	Upshur	TX	32.7003°N 95.0864°W	0143–0147	1.9 mi (3.1 km)	700 yd (640 m)	$20,000
EF1	Numerous trees were snapped or uprooted, some of which caused minor to moderate damage to homes. A high school sustained roof damage.							
EF1	NW of Linden	Cass	TX	33.0972°N 94.4609°W	0216–0224	6.21 mi (9.99 km)	275 yd (251 m)	$0
EF1	Numerous trees were snapped or uprooted, some of which downed power lines.							
EF1	ESE of Haynesville	Claiborne	LA	32.9346°N 93.0201°W	0340–0353	9.29 mi (14.95 km)	820 yd (750 m)	$30,000
EF1	Numerous trees were snapped or uprooted; several trees downed power lines in the area caused major damage to a home.							
EF1	N of Bastrop	Morehouse	LA	32.8563°N 91.9171°W	0448–0454	4.26 mi (6.86 km)	100 yd (91 m)	$10,000
EF1	Several large trees were snapped or uprooted.							

=== April 25 event ===
List of confirmed tornadoes – Saturday, April 25, 2015
EF#	Location	County / Parish	State	Start Coord.	Time (UTC)	Path length	Max width	Damage (2015 USD)
EF1	E of Canton	Madison	MS	32.6094°N 89.9543°W	0658–0659	1.66 mi (2.67 km)	75 yd (69 m)	$20,000
EF1	A number of trees were either snapped or uprooted.							
EF1	NW of Lena	Leake	MS	32.6496°N 89.6589°W	0717–0721	2.5 mi (4.0 km)	300 yd (270 m)	$35,000
EF1	Dozens of trees were snapped or uprooted before the tornado dissipated near the Pearl River.							
EF0	SW of Carthage	Leake	MS	32.6807°N 89.6408°W	0720–0721	0.89 mi (1.43 km)	50 yd (46 m)	$10,000
EF0	Several trees were snapped and uprooted.							
EF1	SSE of Carthage	Leake	MS	32.6904°N 89.5277°W	0728–0732	3.38 mi (5.44 km)	500 yd (460 m)	$200,000
EF1	Five homes sustained mostly roof damage, a trampoline was flipped, and dozens of trees were uprooted.							
EF1	SE of Philadelphia	Neshoba	MS	32.6488°N 89.1155°W	0751–0758	6.52 mi (10.49 km)	500 yd (460 m)	$15,000
EF1	A shed was destroyed, a chicken house sustained roof damage, and several trees were snapped or uprooted, a few of which fell on and destroyed a mobile home.							
EF0	WSW of Cleveland	Kemper	MS	32.7395°N 88.8574°W	0810 – 0811	0.88 mi (1.42 km)	50 yd (46 m)	$10,000
EF0	Tin roofing was peeled off of a hay barn and thrown, and the tree tops and limbs of several pine trees were snapped.							
EF1	S of Jacksonville	Duval	FL	30.291°N 81.6565°W	2152–2158	3.39 mi (5.46 km)	350 yd (320 m)	Unknown
EF1	A brief tornado moved ashore from St. Johns River, snapping several trees and power poles; several structures were impacted by falling trees. Several businesses sustained minor roof damage, and additional trailers were damaged as well.							
EF0	Dixie	Henderson	KY	37.68°N 87.6891°W	2224–2225	0.75 mi (1.21 km)	275 yd (251 m)	$20,000
EF0	At least six trees were uprooted, causing damage to a carport and recreational vehicle upon falling. One home sustained partial shingle loss while another sustained gutter damage.							
EF1	SE of Columbia	Adair	KY	37.0324°N 85.2456°W	0129 – 0136	3.79 mi (6.10 km)	150 yd (140 m)	$150,000
EF1	Numerous trees were snapped or uprooted. A barn was completely destroyed with the top sheared off an adjacent silo, a portion of a second barn was destroyed with the remaining structure slid 2 ft (0.61 m) off its foundation and several well-anchored concrete footings ripped out of the ground, three additional barns sustained damage, and a residence sustained minor siding damage.							
EF2	NW of Brownsville	Edmonson	KY	37.2499°N 86.35°W	0212–0214	0.17 mi (0.27 km)	220 yd (200 m)	$0
EF2	Over 200 trees were snapped, uprooted, or severely twisted.							

=== April 26 event ===
List of confirmed tornadoes – Sunday, April 26, 2015
EF#	Location	County / Parish	State	Start Coord.	Time (UTC)	Path length	Max width	Damage (2015 USD)
EF0	NW of Burkett	Coleman	TX	32.01°N 99.23°W	1942 – 1944	0.13 mi (0.21 km)	50 yd (46 m)	$0
EF0	An emergency manager reported a brief tornado.							
EF0	WNW of May	Brown	TX	31.9871°N 99.0157°W	2010 – 2020	3.26 mi (5.25 km)	50 yd (46 m)	$0
EF0	Members of the public observed a tornado.							
EF0	NW of Sidney	Comanche	TX	32.0418°N 98.8526°W	2028 – 2029	0.95 mi (1.53 km)	25 yd (23 m)	$0
EF0	Amateur radio operators and storm chasers observed a tornado that caused little damage.							
EF0	NNW of Sidney	Comanche	TX	31.9815°N 98.7621°W	2045 – 2046	1.34 mi (2.16 km)	50 yd (46 m)	$0
EF0	Amateur radio operators and storm chasers observed a second tornado over ranch land.							
EF0	N of Proctor	Comanche	TX	32.0386°N 98.5161°W	2105 – 2106	0.79 mi (1.27 km)	50 yd (46 m)	$0
EF0	Trained storm spotters observed a tornado that damaged several trees.							
EF0	NE of Proctor	Comanche	TX	31.9992°N 98.4348°W	2115 – 2116	0.51 mi (0.82 km)	80 yd (73 m)	$0
EF0	Amateur radio operators and trained storm spotters observed a tornado that caused minimal damage to trees.							
EF0	SW of Dublin	Erath	TX	32.0578°N 98.3901°W	2130 – 2131	1.26 mi (2.03 km)	70 yd (64 m)	$0
EF0	Multiple trained storm spotters reported a tornado; spotty tree damage was observed.							
EF0	E of Stephenville	Erath	TX	32.2298°N 98.1017°W	2358 – 2359	0.8 mi (1.3 km)	50 yd (46 m)	$0
EF0	Trained storm spotters observed a tornado over open ranch land.							
EF0	SSW of Glen Rose	Somervell	TX	32.1691°N 97.7777°W	0209 – 0211	0.17 mi (0.27 km)	25 yd (23 m)	$0
EF0	A National Weather Service survey crew found evidence of a brief tornado that produced minimal damage.							
EF1	Lake Brownwood	Brown	TX	31.8639°N 99.0575°W	0300 – 0305	0.99 mi (1.59 km)	175 yd (160 m)	$0
EF1	Widespread damage to farm outbuildings, trees, homes, and boat docks occurred on Nichols Ranch. A well-anchored carport in cement was uplifted.							
EF0	W of Rio Vista	Johnson	TX	32.2335°N 97.507°W	0303 – 0306	2.02 mi (3.25 km)	200 yd (180 m)	$100,000
EF0	The tornado inflicted minor damage to three homes, trees, and a few power lines.							
EF0	W of Rio Vista	Johnson	TX	32.2267°N 97.4381°W	0324 – 0325	1.04 mi (1.67 km)	80 yd (73 m)	$0
EF0	Little damage was observed within an open field.							
EF0	N of Rio Vista	Johnson	TX	32.2326°N 97.383°W	0333 – 0336	2.15 mi (3.46 km)	200 yd (180 m)	$50,000
EF0	An abandoned building was destroyed, and several mobile homes suffered damage.							
EF0	WNW of Rio Vista	Johnson	TX	32.2382°N 97.4108°W	0345 – 0346	0.9 mi (1.4 km)	25 yd (23 m)	$0
EF0	Minimal damage to trees was observed across open fields.							
EF0	E of Rio Vista	Johnson	TX	32.2337°N 97.3468°W	0401 – 0412	5.4 mi (8.7 km)	220 yd (200 m)	$600,000
EF0	Approximately 20 homes sustained superficial damage. Numerous trees, barns, and farm buildings were destroyed.							
EF1	E of Rio Vista	Johnson	TX	32.2462°N 97.3168°W	0416 – 0418	1.03 mi (1.66 km)	100 yd (91 m)	$60,000
EF1	A well-built home had a large portion of its roof removed, and several areas of tree damage were observed.							
EF0	E of Rio Vista	Johnson	TX	32.2668°N 97.31°W	0416 – 0420	1.61 mi (2.59 km)	80 yd (73 m)	$0
EF0	The anticyclonic tornado produced minor damage to trees.							
EF0	ESE of Blum	Hill	TX	32.1219°N 97.3384°W	0424 – 0425	0.66 mi (1.06 km)	30 yd (27 m)	$0
EF0	Amateur radio operators observed a brief tornado that damaged several trees.							
EF0	W of Grandview	Johnson	TX	32.2948°N 97.2354°W	0425 – 0434	5.5 mi (8.9 km)	100 yd (91 m)	$200,000
EF0	Damage to trees, houses, and mobile homes was observed.							

=== April 27 event ===
List of confirmed tornadoes – Monday, April 27, 2015
EF#	Location	County / Parish	State	Start Coord.	Time (UTC)	Path length	Max width	Damage (2015 USD)
EF1	S of Brookeland	Jasper	TX	31.0639°N 93.992°W	1100–1109	3.47 mi (5.58 km)	80 yd (73 m)	$20,000
EF1	Several trees were damaged; fallen trees damaged two residences and destroyed a shed.							
EF1	N of Pierre Part	Assumption	LA	30.0037°N 91.1981°W	1415–1417	0.64 mi (1.03 km)	150 yd (140 m)	Unknown
EF1	Numerous large trees were snapped. A number of homes were impacted, including one that had its carport destroyed, a second that had its porch collapsed, a third that lost a majority of its tin roofing off the back of the residence, a fourth that had its chimney collapsed, and a fifth that had a large portion of its tin roofing removed and wooden beams exposed. A metal warehouse building had its doors blown inward.							
EF0	N of Napoleonville	Assumption	LA	30.0037°N 91.1981°W	1428–1430	0.64 mi (1.03 km)	75 yd (69 m)	$0
EF0	Several large tree branches were snapped and a few trees were uprooted.							
EF1	SSW of Chackbay	Lafourche	LA	29.8572°N 90.8043°W	1443–1444	0.5 mi (0.80 km)	75 yd (69 m)	Unknown
EF1	Several large trees were snapped or uprooted, and several power poles were snapped. A small professional building had large portions of siding and some shingles removed. Several residences had shingles removed, and a detached garage was collapsed.							
EF0	Bayou Gauche	St. Charles	LA	29.8094°N 90.4313°W	1508–1509	0.8 mi (1.3 km)	50 yd (46 m)	Unknown
EF0	Several trees and tree limbs were snapped or uprooted, minor damage to roof coverings was noted, power poles were observed leaning, and a home had some siding and shingles removed.							
EF1	Northwestern Kenner	Jefferson	LA	30.0254°N 90.2789°W	1523–1524	0.57 mi (0.92 km)	50 yd (46 m)	Unknown
EF1	Multiple wooden poles and trees were snapped or bent, the roof was removed from the back porch of a house, and a few residences sustained minor roof damage.							

== See also ==
- Tornadoes of 2015
- List of United States tornadoes from January to March 2015
- List of United States tornadoes in May 2015
