= List of United States tornadoes from January to March 2015 =

This is a list of all tornadoes that were confirmed by local offices of the National Weather Service in the United States from January to March 2015. Based on the 1991–2010 average, 35 tornadoes touch down in January, 29 touch down in February and 80 touch down in March. These tornadoes are commonly focused across the Southern United States due to their proximity to the unstable airmass and warm waters of the Gulf of Mexico, as well as California in association with winter storms.

Other than a moderate outbreak at the beginning of the month, January was quiet with 27 tornadoes touching down, which was slightly below average. Tornado activity in February and March was essentially non-existent and both months were significantly below average. February had only two tornadoes, and all ten tornadoes during the month of March touched down during a small outbreak between March 24–25 in Arkansas, Oklahoma, and Missouri.

== January ==
Confirmed tornadoes by Enhanced Fujita rating
EFU	EF0	EF1	EF2	EF3	EF4	EF5	Total
0	11	14	2	0	0	0	27

=== January 3 event ===
List of confirmed tornadoes – Saturday, January 3, 2015 (Note: All dates are based on the local time zone where the tornado touched down; however, all times are in Coordinated Universal Time for consistency.)
EF#	Location	County / Parish	State	Start Coord.	Time (UTC)	Path length	Max width	Damage (2015 USD)
EF0	S of Oak Vale	Lawrence	MS	31.43°N 89.96°W	2005	0.08 mi (0.13 km)	50 yd (46 m)	$1,000
EF0	A brief tornado was observed by storm spotters but caused no damage.							
EF1	WNW of Collins	Covington	MS	31.68°N 89.68°W	2036 – 2039	1.88 mi (3.03 km)	50 yd (46 m)	$20,000
EF1	The roof of a mobile home was damaged and trees were snapped.							
EF1	SSE of Mount Olive	Covington	MS	31.7°N 89.65°W	2039 – 2040	1.03 mi (1.66 km)	100 yd (91 m)	$40,000
EF1	Numerous trees were snapped.							
EF2	W of Rose Hill	Jasper, Newton	MS	32.1304°N 89.0711°W	2104 – 2117	8.03 mi (12.92 km)	200 yd (180 m)	$507,000
EF2	Six mobile homes, a shed, and an outbuilding were destroyed, much of the roof was removed from a home, and another home sustained minor structural damage. Ten buildings in all were damaged or destroyed by the tornado. Numerous trees and power poles were downed as well.							
EF1	S of Chunky to WSW of Nellieburg	Newton, Lauderdale	MS	32.27°N 88.93°W	2124 – 2136	9.89 mi (15.92 km)	100 yd (91 m)	$30,000
EF1	A house sustained roof damage, an outbuilding was damaged, and many trees were downed.							
EF1	W of Bailey	Lauderdale	MS	32.4741°N 88.7416°W	2148 – 2155	3.56 mi (5.73 km)	50 yd (46 m)	$47,000
EF1	Numerous pine trees were snapped, several houses sustained minor roof damage, and a shed was destroyed.							
EF0	E of Cuba	Sumter	AL	32.4312°N 88.3707°W	2206 – 2208	0.67 mi (1.08 km)	100 yd (91 m)	$0
EF0	A manufactured home sustained damage to its roof and anchoring system. Approximately 12 trees were downed.							
EF1	SE of Lauderdale	Lauderdale	MS	32.4876°N 88.482°W	2231 – 2235	2.57 mi (4.14 km)	50 yd (46 m)	$20,000
EF1	Multiple trees were snapped or uprooted and one building sustained minor structural damage.							
EF1	NNE of Emelle	Sumter	AL	32.8062°N 88.2937°W	2236 – 2237	1.23 mi (1.98 km)	200 yd (180 m)	$0
EF1	Hundreds of trees were snapped or uprooted.							
EF1	E of Tunnel Springs	Monroe	AL	31.6566°N 87.1667°W	2252 – 2253	0.11 mi (0.18 km)	50 yd (46 m)	$10,000
EF1	Trees were snapped or uprooted and roof damage was observed.							
EF0	NNE of Caledonia	Lowndes	MS	33.73°N 88.29°W	2253	0.25 mi (400 m)	50 yd (46 m)	$5,000
EF0	Brief tornado snapped the tops off of multiple pine trees.							
EF1	N of West Greene	Greene	AL	32.9596°N 88.1268°W	2255 – 2257	1.61 mi (2.59 km)	400 yd (370 m)	$0
EF1	Dozens of trees were snapped or uprooted; one tree fell on a home, causing major damage to the structure. A mobile home sustained minor skirting damage and a few outbuildings were damaged.							
EF0	NW of Ralph	Greene, Tuscaloosa	AL	33.1243°N 87.8438°W	2319 – 2321	1.27 mi (2.04 km)	100 yd (91 m)	$0
EF0	Several trees were uprooted. Two homes sustained roof damage and several outbuildings were damaged or destroyed.							
EF0	NNE of Hamilton	Marion	AL	34.1765°N 87.9537°W	2323 – 2324	0.28 mi (0.45 km)	60 yd (55 m)	$0
EF0	A brief, weak tornado caused roof damage to a home and downed several trees, with debris being thrown several hundred yards downstream.							

=== January 4 event ===
List of confirmed tornadoes – Sunday, January 4, 2015
EF#	Location	County / Parish	State	Start Coord.	Time (UTC)	Path length	Max width	Damage (2015 USD)
EF2	N of Dozier to E of Luverne	Crenshaw	AL	31.57°N 86.375°W	0911 – 0935	14.32 mi (23.05 km)	100 yd (91 m)	$200,000
EF2	Chicken houses and outbuildings were destroyed, a house and a car sustained significant damage, and many trees were downed.							
EF0	Pinckard	Dale	AL	31.304°N 85.561°W	1227 – 1228	1.5 mi (2.4 km)	50 yd (46 m)	$10,000
EF0	Minor damage to structures occurred.							
EF0	NW of Midland City	Dale	AL	31.3205°N 85.5041°W	1230	0.02 mi (0.032 km)	50 yd (46 m)	$5,000 (estimated)
EF0	A few structures surrounding the baseball field of a local high school were damaged.							
EF0	SSE of Shorterville	Henry	AL	31.522°N 85.086°W	1325 – 1326	0.56 mi (0.90 km)	50 yd (46 m)	$0
EF0	Trees were blown down.							
EF1	NW of Omega	Tift	GA	31.354°N 83.625°W	1627 – 1628	0.33 mi (0.53 km)	100 yd (91 m)	$3,000
EF1	An outbuilding was completely destroyed, a portion of a screened-in porch was blown down, and a small, old barn sustained roof damage. A few trees were snapped.							
EF0	N of Pineview	Pulaski	GA	32.1207°N 83.5002°W	1632 – 1634	0.16 mi (0.26 km)	50 yd (46 m)	$15,000
EF0	Approximately 20 trees were snapped; a large tree fell on a brick outbuilding, inflicting minor damage to the roof. A house sustained minor damage, and its wellhouse covering was blown off.							
EF0	SE of Hawkinsville	Pulaski	GA	32.173°N 83.3551°W	1644 – 1646	2.18 mi (3.51 km)	100 yd (91 m)	$10,000
EF0	A tin-covered barn was blown over, a house sustained minor roof damage, and two trees were downed.							
EF1	W of Enigma	Tift	GA	31.417°N 83.395°W	1645 – 1649	0.27 mi (0.43 km)	100 yd (91 m)	$10,000
EF1	One home's shed was destroyed, with debris being thrown into trees. A church building sustained substantial roof damage, including its steeple falling off, two associated storage sheds were destroyed, and a dumpster was moved off of its foundation. Several trees were downed. Two poles and a sign were damaged.							
EF1	NW of Eastman	Dodge	GA	32.2245°N 83.2403°W	1655 – 1657	0.32 mi (0.51 km)	120 yd (110 m)	$3,000
EF1	About 10 trees were downed.							
EF1	SSW of Rockingham	Bacon	GA	31.5345°N 82.4286°W	1803 – 1808	4.81 mi (7.74 km)	50 yd (46 m)	Unknown
EF1	Two mobile homes sustained significant damage and numerous trees were snapped.							
EF1	Western Savannah	Chatham	GA	32.0365°N 81.2301°W	2003 – 2005	3 mi (4.8 km)	440 yd (400 m)	Unknown
EF1	Shingles and vinyl siding were ripped off of several homes on the west side of Savannah. Several large wooden fences were damaged, a gazebo was damaged, and a trampoline was lifted and thrown. An air conditioner unit was lifted and moved several feet. Large trees were downed and snapped, with two homes sustaining damage after trees fell on them.							

=== January 18 event ===
List of confirmed tornadoes – Sunday, January 18, 2015
EF#	Location	County / Parish	State	Start Coord.	Time (UTC)	Path length	Max width	Damage (2015 USD)
EF1	Gig Harbor	Pierce	WA	47.33°N 122.59°W	2218	4.1 mi (6.6 km)	175 yd (160 m)	Unknown
EF1	Information listed is based on eyewitness reports and video.							

=== January 24 event ===
List of confirmed tornadoes – Saturday, January 24, 2015
EF#	Location	County / Parish	State	Start Coord.	Time (UTC)	Path length	Max width	Damage (2015 USD)
EF0	Myakka State Forest	Sarasota, Charlotte	FL	26.989°N 82.2878°W	0842 – 0849	4.89 mi (7.87 km)	50 yd (46 m)	$30,000
EF0	Trees within the forest were snapped or uprooted. A trailer on the grounds of a ranger station was tossed 30–40 yd (27–37 m) and destroyed.							

== February ==
Confirmed tornadoes by Enhanced Fujita rating
EFU	EF0	EF1	EF2	EF3	EF4	EF5	Total
0	1	1	0	0	0	0	2

=== February 5 event ===
List of confirmed tornadoes – Thursday, February 5, 2015
EF#	Location	County / Parish	State	Start Coord.	Time (UTC)	Path length	Max width	Damage (2015 USD)
EF1	ENE of Boca West	Palm Beach	FL	26.3839°N 80.153°W	1236 – 1238	1.4 mi (2.3 km)	70 yd (64 m)	$13,000
EF1	Several large trees were snapped or uprooted, and several light poles were downed, damaging vehicles and the roofs of homes.							

=== February 23 event ===
List of confirmed tornadoes – Monday, February 23, 2015
EF#	Location	County / Parish	State	Start Coord.	Time (UTC)	Path length	Max width	Damage (2015 USD)
EF0	SSE of Blackwells Corner	Kern	CA	35.48°N 119.79°W	1940 – 1950	0.5 mi (0.80 km)	50 yd (46 m)	$0
EF0	A cold-core funnel touched down, becoming a landspout. No damage was reported.							

== March ==
Confirmed tornadoes by Enhanced Fujita rating
EFU	EF0	EF1	EF2	EF3	EF4	EF5	Total
0	8	1	2	0	0	0	11

=== March 24 event ===
List of confirmed tornadoes – Tuesday, March 24, 2015
EF#	Location	County / Parish	State	Start Coord.	Time (UTC)	Path length	Max width	Damage (2015 USD)
EF0	E of Diamond City	Marion	AR	36.4586°N 92.8515°W	0011–0012	0.6 mi (0.97 km)	30 yd (27 m)	$0
EF0	An emergency manager observed a waterspout over Bull Shoals Lake.							

=== March 25 event ===
List of confirmed tornadoes – Wednesday, March 25, 2015
EF#	Location	County / Parish	State	Start Coord.	Time (UTC)	Path length	Max width	Damage (2015 USD)
EF2	SE of Westport to Sand Springs	Pawnee, Osage, Tulsa	OK	36.1832°N 96.302°W	2221–2238	11.1 mi (17.9 km)	800 yd (730 m)	$2,100,000
EF2	1 death – A strong tornado developed as a waterspout over Keystone Lake near the Pawnee/Osage County border. Many homes, barns, and a church were damaged, some heavily, and a doughnut shop was destroyed. Numerous mobile homes were badly damaged or destroyed, resulting in one fatality. Numerous trees and power lines were downed along the path, and 30 people were injured. Strong straight-line winds (up to 100 mph) accompanied the tornado, resulting in additional damage to structures, including a gymnasium.							
EF1	NW of Clifty	Madison	AR	36.2633°N 93.8306°W	2226–2233	3.9 mi (6.3 km)	650 yd (590 m)	$250,000
EF1	Five chicken houses and several homes, including one mobile home, were damaged, some severely. Several trees were downed or snapped as well.							
EF0	NNE of Clifty	Madison	AR	36.2698°N 93.7703°W	2232–2234	1 mi (1.6 km)	200 yd (180 m)	$25,000
EF0	A barn was destroyed, the roof of a house was damaged, and several large tree limbs were snapped.							
EF0	SSE of Tulsa International Airport	Tulsa	OK	36.1689°N 95.8815°W	2301–2305	2.3 mi (3.7 km)	600 yd (550 m)	$200,000
EF0	Numerous site-built homes and mobile homes, an apartment complex, a strip mall, and other businesses sustained mostly roof and minor structural damage. A carport was destroyed, and a garage was partially pushed inward as well. Many trees and tree limbs were snapped along the path. The tornado dissipated just 900 yd (820 m) east of the National Weather Service Office in Tulsa.							
EF0	WNW of Mountain View	Howell	MO	37.03°N 91.82°W	2301–2305	0.62 mi (1.00 km)	100 yd (91 m)	$5,000
EF0	Half of a barn's roof was blown off and a greenhouse was rolled over, and approximately 20 trees were snapped.							
EF0	WSW of Yukon	Canadian	OK	35.46°N 97.83°W	2312–2314	0.66 mi (1.06 km)	50 yd (46 m)	$0
EF0	A short-lived anticyclonic tornado was observed with no reported damage.							
EF0	S of Bethany	Oklahoma	OK	35.476°N 97.635°W	2329	0.2 mi (0.32 km)	30 yd (27 m)	$1,000
EF0	Two outbuildings were severely damaged, and three houses sustained shingle damage.							
EF2	Southwest Oklahoma City to SE of Moore	Cleveland	OK	35.3482°N 97.5658°W	2334–2350	11.21 mi (18.04 km)	50 yd (46 m)	$50,000,000
EF2	This tornado formed along the leading edge of a squall line, and caused considerable damage in parts of Oklahoma City and Moore. Many homes were damaged in residential areas, including several that had their roofs torn off. A few of these homes sustained loss of exterior walls. Three radio towers were bent in half or collapsed, a gas station sustained awning damage, and an elementary school sustained major damage to its roof. A tire shop had much of its roof blown off as well. Trees and power lines were downed, and vehicles were tossed and flipped, a few of which were overturned on I-35.							
EF0	NW of Mazie	Mayes	OK	36.1164°N 95.3903°W	0002	0.1 mi (0.16 km)	50 yd (46 m)	$0
EF0	Trained storm spotters and storm chasers observed a brief tornado.							
EF0	W of Watts	Adair	OK	36.12°N 94.6596°W	0106	0.1 mi (0.16 km)	50 yd (46 m)	$0
EF0	Storm chasers observed a brief tornado.							

== See also ==
- Tornadoes of 2015
- List of United States tornadoes from October to December 2014
- List of United States tornadoes in April 2015
