= List of United States tornadoes from August to September 2014 =

This is a list of all tornadoes that were confirmed by local offices of the National Weather Service in the United States from August to September 2014.

== United States yearly total ==
Confirmed tornadoes by Enhanced Fujita rating
EFU	EF0	EF1	EF2	EF3	EF4	EF5	Total
0	510	321	71	20	7	0	929

== August ==
Confirmed tornadoes by Enhanced Fujita rating
EFU	EF0	EF1	EF2	EF3	EF4	EF5	Total
0	63	8	0	0	0	0	71

=== August 4 event ===
List of confirmed tornadoes – Monday, August 4, 2014 (Note: All dates are based on the local time zone where the tornado touched down; however, all times are in Coordinated Universal Time for consistency.)
EF#	Location	County / Parish	State	Start Coord.	Time (UTC)	Path length	Max width	Damage (Note: All damage totals are in 2014 USD unless otherwise stated.)	Summary	Refs
EF0	S of Boulder City	Clark	NV	35.82°N 114.86°W	1940	0.08 mi (0.13 km)	25 yd (23 m)	$0	Brief tornado touchdown as documented on camera; no reported damage.	

=== August 6 event ===
List of confirmed tornadoes – Wednesday, August 6, 2014
EF#	Location	County / Parish	State	Start Coord.	Time (UTC)	Path length	Max width	Damage	Summary	Refs
EF0	S of Bennett	Adams	CO	39.76°N 104.42°W	0010	0.1 mi (0.16 km)	50 yd (46 m)	$0	Brief tornado touchdown; no damage.	

=== August 9 event ===
List of confirmed tornadoes – Saturday, August 9, 2014
EF#	Location	County / Parish	State	Start Coord.	Time (UTC)	Path length	Max width	Damage	Summary	Refs
EF0	N of St. Francis	Cheyenne	KS	39.84°N 101.80°W	2045–2047	0.5 mi (0.80 km)	10 yd (9.1 m)	$0	Brief landspout tornado as reported by a storm chaser; no reported damage.	
EF0	SE of St. Francis	Cheyenne	KS	39.70°N 101.71°W	2057–2058	0.25 mi (0.40 km)	10 yd (9.1 m)	$0	Brief tornado as reported by emergency management; no reported damage.	
EF0	Lake Cochrane	Deuel	SD	44.71°N 96.46°W	2130–2145	0.83 mi (1.34 km)	20 yd (18 m)	Unknown	Docks, boats, boat lifts, canopies, shoreline shrubbery, and a few trees sustained minor damage. Two homes were impacted, with the roof of one house rolled back and tossed a short distance.	
EF0	SSW of Bird City	Cheyenne	KS	39.62°N 101.63°W	2155	0.25 mi (0.40 km)	10 yd (9.1 m)	$0	Brief tornado as reported by a storm chaser; no reported damage.	

=== August 11 event ===
List of confirmed tornadoes – Monday, August 11, 2014
EF#	Location	County / Parish	State	Start Coord.	Time (UTC)	Path length	Max width	Damage	Summary	Refs
EF0	Chequamegon Bay	Ashland	WI	46.5843°N 90.9227°W	1846–1847	0.05 mi (0.080 km)	3 yd (2.7 m)	$0	A waterspout briefly moved ashore before dissipating.	
EF0	W of Trinway	Muskingum	OH	40.15°N 82.056°W	1900–1901	0.16 mi (0.26 km)	25 yd (23 m)	$1,000	Areas of corn in a field were knocked down and a large tree branch fell on a home.	

=== August 12 event ===
List of confirmed tornadoes – Tuesday, August 12, 2014
EF#	Location	County / Parish	State	Start Coord.	Time (UTC)	Path length	Max width	Damage	Summary	Refs
EF0	NE of Johnstown	Licking	OH	40.17°N 82.63°W	1515–1516	0.09 mi (0.14 km)	20 yd (18 m)	$0	A brief tornado as observed on video; no reported damage.	

=== August 13 event ===
List of confirmed tornadoes – Wednesday, August 13, 2014
EF#	Location	County / Parish	State	Start Coord.	Time (UTC)	Path length	Max width	Damage	Summary	Refs
EF0	E of Sunnyside	Benton	WA	46.32°N 119.80°W	0130–0133	0.25 mi (0.40 km)	15 yd (14 m)	$0	Brief tornado touchdown in an open field; no reported damage.	

=== August 15 event ===
List of confirmed tornadoes – Friday, August 15, 2014
EF#	Location	County / Parish	State	Start Coord.	Time (UTC)	Path length	Max width	Damage	Summary	Refs
EF0	Fort Pierce	St. Lucie	FL	27.52°N 80.36°W	1755–1756	0.15 mi (0.24 km)	15 yd (14 m)	$0	Brief tornado as observed by a motorist and on video; no reported damage.	
EF0	NW of Willcox	Cochise	AZ	32.2659°N 109.9993°W	2039–2045	0.79 mi (1.27 km)	50 yd (46 m)	$0	Brief tornado as documented on camera; no reported damage.	

=== August 16 event ===
List of confirmed tornadoes – Saturday, August 16, 2014
EF#	Location	County / Parish	State	Start Coord.	Time (UTC)	Path length	Max width	Damage	Summary	Refs
EF0	WNW of Boca West	Palm Beach	FL	26.42°N 80.27°W	2033–2035	0.37 mi (0.60 km)	10 yd (9.1 m)	$0	Brief tornado as observed by the public; no reported damage.	

=== August 17 event ===
List of confirmed tornadoes – Sunday, August 17, 2014
EF#	Location	County / Parish	State	Start Coord.	Time (UTC)	Path length	Max width	Damage	Summary	Refs
EF1	NE of Robards	Henderson	KY	37.69°N 87.56°W	2133–2136	1.65 mi (2.66 km)	60 yd (55 m)	$45,000	Three homes and a mobile home sustained minor roof and siding damage. Numerous tree limbs were broken and a few trees were uprooted.	
EF0	E of Central City	Muhlenberg	KY	37.30°N 87.02°W	2231–2232	0.59 mi (0.95 km)	125 yd (114 m)	$12,000	Several trees were snapped and a cornfield was damaged.	
EF0	SSE of Dolliver	Emmet	IA	43.42°N 94.60°W	0000–0002	0.83 mi (1.34 km)	25 yd (23 m)	$1,000	Brief tornado observed by emergency management.	

=== August 18 event ===
List of confirmed tornadoes – Monday, August 18, 2014
EF#	Location	County / Parish	State	Start Coord.	Time (UTC)	Path length	Max width	Damage	Summary	Refs
EF0	SSE of Medina	Winnebago	WI	44.23°N 88.62°W	2123–2125	2.06 mi (3.32 km)	50 yd (46 m)	$0	Two power poles were leaned and a few trees were blown downed.	

=== August 20 event ===
List of confirmed tornadoes – Wednesday, August 20, 2014
EF#	Location	County / Parish	State	Start Coord.	Time (UTC)	Path length	Max width	Damage	Summary	Refs
EF0	WSW of Richmond	Macomb	MI	42.78°N 82.83°W	1804–1807	0.29 mi (0.47 km)	100 yd (91 m)	$5,000	Minor tree damage was observed and thin medal sheds were destroyed.	
EF0	SE of Mackay	Custer	ID	43.89°N 113.58°W	1945–1950	0.1 mi (0.16 km)	5 yd (4.6 m)	$0	Numerous photographs of a brief tornado; no reported damage.	

=== August 21 event ===
List of confirmed tornadoes – Thursday, August 21, 2014
EF#	Location	County / Parish	State	Start Coord.	Time (UTC)	Path length	Max width	Damage	Summary	Refs
EF0	N of Mountain Lake	Cottonwood	MN	44.04°N 94.92°W	1020–1021	0.1 mi (0.16 km)	50 yd (46 m)	$0	Brief tornado; no reported damage.	
EF0	SW of Fuller	Jefferson	PA	41.09°N 78.99°W	2025–2026	0.54 mi (0.87 km)	20 yd (18 m)	$500	Damage was limited to hardwood trees.	
EF0	SE of Knox Dale	Jefferson	PA	41.07°N 79.01°W	2027–2035	5.36 mi (8.63 km)	50 yd (46 m)	$500	Hardwood trees were damaged.	

=== August 23 event ===
List of confirmed tornadoes – Saturday, August 23, 2014
EF#	Location	County / Parish	State	Start Coord.	Time (UTC)	Path length	Max width	Damage	Summary	Refs
EF0	W of Cresbard	Faulk	SD	45.17°N 99.09°W	2230–2235	2.13 mi (3.43 km)	10 yd (9.1 m)	$0	Only minor tree damage was observed.	
EF0	W of Cresbard	Faulk	SD	45.18°N 99.13°W	2235–2246	4.4 mi (7.1 km)	15 yd (14 m)	Unknown	A livestock trailer was blown over, a garage door was lofted over the roof of the building, and tree damage was observed.	
EF1	NE of Ipswich	Edmunds	SD	45.48°N 98.97°W	2331–2338	1.46 mi (2.35 km)	10 yd (9.1 m)	Unknown	A section of a farm roof was lost while the siding was damaged. A metal outbuilding lost a majority of its roof, and a tractor trailer was damaged due to flying debris. Tree damage and a dented grain building was observed.	

=== August 24 event ===
List of confirmed tornadoes – Sunday, August 24, 2014
EF#	Location	County / Parish	State	Start Coord.	Time (UTC)	Path length	Max width	Damage	Summary	Refs
EF0	SW of Morrill	Benton, Morrison	MN	45.80°N 93.98°W	2247–2302	5.67 mi (9.12 km)	150 yd (140 m)	$2,000	A roof was torn from a farm outbuilding; tree damage was observed.	

=== August 25 event ===
List of confirmed tornadoes – Monday, August 25, 2014
EF#	Location	County / Parish	State	Start Coord.	Time (UTC)	Path length	Max width	Damage	Summary	Refs
EF0	S of Florence	Fremont	CO	38.39°N 105.12°W	2340–2343	0.96 mi (1.54 km)	75 yd (69 m)	$0	Brief tornado; no reported damage.	

=== August 28 event ===
List of confirmed tornadoes – Thursday, August 28, 2014
EF#	Location	County / Parish	State	Start Coord.	Time (UTC)	Path length	Max width	Damage	Summary	Refs
EF0	ENE of Natoma	Osborne	KS	39.22°N 98.92°W	2230	0.1 mi (0.16 km)	25 yd (23 m)	$0	Brief tornado in open country; no reported damage.	
EF1	Milberger	Russell	KS	38.72°N 98.92°W	2330–2332	2 mi (3.2 km)	220 yd (200 m)	$0	Tractors were flipped and windows were broken in town.	
EF0	SW of Mayfield	Yankton	SD	43.04°N 97.38°W	2344–0008	3.74 mi (6.02 km)	50 yd (46 m)	$0	A tornado was observed over open country.	

=== August 31 event ===
List of confirmed tornadoes – Sunday, August 31, 2014
EF#	Location	County / Parish	State	Start Coord.	Time (UTC)	Path length	Max width	Damage	Summary	Refs
EF0	NNW of Arion	Crawford	IA	41.9687°N 95.5279°W	2324–2342	5.49 mi (8.84 km)	330 yd (300 m)	$5,000	High resolution satellite data confirmed a tornado.	
EF0	Odebolt	Sac	IA	42.3008°N 95.3064°W	2344–2350	2.13 mi (3.43 km)	60 yd (55 m)	$97,000	Four grain bins were destroyed and a few augers were damaged.	
EF0	Worcester	Worcester	MA	42.24°N 71.8°W	0010–0014	2.06 mi (3.32 km)	176 yd (161 m)	$100,000	Some trees were snapped or uprooted; fallen trees caused significant damage to cars and minor damage to homes.	
EF0	ESE of Vail	Crawford	IA	42.0285°N 95.147°W	0026–0033	2.13 mi (3.43 km)	200 yd (180 m)	$10,000	A tornado found using high resolution satellite imagery damaged crops.	
EF0	SE of Arcadia	Carroll	IA	42.0233°N 95.0192°W	0034–0044	4.96 mi (7.98 km)	90 yd (82 m)	$7,000	Two grain bins were severely damaged.	
EF0	ESE of Arcadia	Carroll	IA	42.0421°N 94.9734°W	0038–0044	2.71 mi (4.36 km)	140 yd (130 m)	$10,000	A tornado found using high-resolution satellite imagery damaged crops.	
EF0	NE of Carroll	Carroll	IA	42.0733°N 94.8315°W	0045–0048	3.34 mi (5.38 km)	200 yd (180 m)	$10,000	A tornado found using high-resolution satellite imagery damaged crops.	
EF0	N of Ralston	Carroll, Greene	IA	42.109°N 94.6813°W	0057–0107	5.64 mi (9.08 km)	100 yd (91 m)	$14,000	A small open farm structure was destroyed. Trees and crops were damaged.	
EF0	W of Paton	Greene	IA	42.1272°N 94.4183°W	0111–0116	4.49 mi (7.23 km)	45 yd (41 m)	$6,000	A small barn on a farmstead lost its roof.	
EF0	NE of Churdan	Greene, Webster	IA	42.1726°N 94.3781°W	0115–0125	9.79 mi (15.76 km)	360 yd (330 m)	$12,000	An old grain silo, trees, and crops were damaged.	
EF0	SW of Gowrie	Webster	IA	42.2344°N 94.3884°W	0119–0124	5.07 mi (8.16 km)	95 yd (87 m)	$6,000	Extensive crop damage was observed.	
EF0	S of Fort Dodge	Webster	IA	42.4399°N 94.2101°W	0122–0125	1.67 mi (2.69 km)	25 yd (23 m)	$3,000	A tornado produced crop damage.	
EF0	NNE of Paton	Webster	IA	42.2341°N 94.221°W	0124–0135	6.42 mi (10.33 km)	570 yd (520 m)	$10,000	Grain bins sustained minor damage.	
EF0	S of Gowrie	Webster	IA	42.2622°N 94.3064°W	0126–0129	2.85 mi (4.59 km)	400 yd (370 m)	$5,000	Well-defined swirls and convergence were noted in crops.	
EF0	SE of Perry	Dallas	IA	41.7206°N 94.1135°W	0131–0150	9.48 mi (15.26 km)	110 yd (100 m)	$4,000	A long-lived tornado damaged crops.	
EF1	N of Dayton	Webster	IA	42.3035°N 94.0837°W	0135–0141	5.33 mi (8.58 km)	100 yd (91 m)	$207,000	A hog containment building was destroyed and numerous corn fields were damaged. Minor tree damage occurred.	
EF1	NNW of Stratford	Webster, Hamilton	IA	42.3111°N 93.9704°W	0140–0145	4.62 mi (7.44 km)	205 yd (187 m)	$3,000	Crop and tree damage occurred.	
EF0	Stratford	Hamilton	IA	42.2747°N 93.9188°W	0140–0147	5.42 mi (8.72 km)	90 yd (82 m)	$4,000	Crop and tree damage occurred. This tornado merged with the 0142–0151 UTC EF0 tornado, the first documented instance of a tornado merger resultant from a squall line.	
EF0	NW of Stanhope	Hamilton	IA	42.289°N 93.8646°W	0142–0151	6.21 mi (9.99 km)	280 yd (260 m)	$7,000	Crop and tree damage occurred, and shingles were removed from a house. This tornado merged with the 0140–0147 UTC EF0 tornado, the first documented instance of a tornado merger resultant from a squall line.	
EF1	W of Story City	Boone, Hamilton	IA	42.1784°N 93.8183°W	0143–0149	6.15 mi (9.90 km)	90 yd (82 m)	$7,000	A lean-to was destroyed, trees were uprooted, and crops were damaged.	
EF0	NE of Stanhope	Hamilton	IA	42.2953°N 93.7786°W	0146–0152	5.24 mi (8.43 km)	65 yd (59 m)	$4,000	Minor tree and crop damage was documented.	
EF0	SW of Kamrar	Hamilton	IA	42.3591°N 93.7931°W	0150–0151	1.35 mi (2.17 km)	60 yd (55 m)	$100,000	Three grain bins on a farmstead were destroyed. Crops were damaged.	
EF0	SSW of Kamrar	Hamilton	IA	42.3704°N 93.7613°W	0152–0154	1.73 mi (2.78 km)	340 yd (310 m)	$79,000	The roof was ripped off a hog containment building, and crops were damaged.	
EF0	ENE of Kamrar	Hamilton	IA	42.3952°N 93.6383°W	0158–0203	3.72 mi (5.99 km)	60 yd (55 m)	$2,000	Crops were damaged.	
EF0	SSW of Dows	Hamilton, Wright	IA	42.5526°N 93.6369°W	0159–0207	7.04 mi (11.33 km)	170 yd (160 m)	$33,000	Two empty grain bins were destroyed and crops were damaged.	
EF0	W of Janesville	Bremer	IA	42.6518°N 92.5545°W	0201–0203	1.89 mi (3.04 km)	70 yd (64 m)	$2,000	Crops were damaged.	
EF0	SE of Williams	Hamilton	IA	42.4426°N 93.5181°W	0206–0207	1.15 mi (1.85 km)	50 yd (46 m)	$2,000	Some crop damage occurred.	
EF0	SE of Dows	Franklin	IA	42.595°N 93.4844°W	0207–0210	2.41 mi (3.88 km)	75 yd (69 m)	$2,000	Minor crop damage was documented.	
EF1	SW of Alden	Hamilton, Hardin	IA	42.4454°N 93.4911°W	0208–0210	2.63 mi (4.23 km)	150 yd (140 m)	$119,000	Two grain bins were destroyed and three outbuildings were severely damaged on a farmstead. Another outbuilding lost a portion of its roof. Crops were damaged.	
EF0	NNW of Buckeye	Hardin	IA	42.4635°N 93.4218°W	0211–0213	2.17 mi (3.49 km)	60 yd (55 m)	$1,000	Crops were damaged.	
EF1	W of Owasa	Hardin	IA	42.4188°N 93.2394°W	0218–0219	1.55 mi (2.49 km)	150 yd (140 m)	$29,000	A grain bin was destroyed and several trees were uprooted on a farmstead.	
EF0	S of Iowa Falls	Hardin	IA	42.4695°N 93.3009°W	0218–0219	1.39 mi (2.24 km)	200 yd (180 m)	$2,000	Swirls were distinct across several agricultural fields.	
EF0	SSE of Stuart	Adair	IA	41.4332°N 94.3047°W	0223–0224	0.86 mi (1.38 km)	50 yd (46 m)	$1,000	Crops were damaged.	
EF0	SE of Ackley	Grundy	IA	42.5134°N 93.0049°W	0235–0237	1.66 mi (2.67 km)	75 yd (69 m)	$2,000	Crops were damaged.	
EF0	Aplington	Butler	IA	42.5565°N 92.9018°W	0239–0242	1.96 mi (3.15 km)	55 yd (50 m)	$22,000	Two outbuildings were severely damaged and trees were uprooted on a farmstead.	
EF0	N of Parkersburg	Butler	IA	42.601°N 92.7704°W	0249–0252	2.2 mi (3.5 km)	85 yd (78 m)	$3,000	Crops were damaged. This tornado likely merged with the subsequent tornado before dissipating.	
EF0	NNE of Parkersburg	Butler	IA	42.627°N 92.7511°W	0251–0253	1.71 mi (2.75 km)	65 yd (59 m)	$2,000	Crops were damaged. This tornado likely merged with the preceding tornado before dissipating.	
EF0	SW of Waverly	Butler, Bremer	IA	42.652°N 92.5586°W	0300–0303	0.97 mi (1.56 km)	85 yd (78 m)	$4,000	Trees sustained minor damage on a farmstead and crops were damaged.	
EF0	SE of Janesville	Black Hawk	IA	42.6172°N 92.4655°W	0304–0307	2.07 mi (3.33 km)	130 yd (120 m)	$3,000	Trees and crops were damaged.	
EF0	SSE of Denver	Black Hawk	IA	42.5971°N 92.3275°W	0312–0317	3.22 mi (5.18 km)	80 yd (73 m)	$2,000	Crops were damaged.	
EF0	N of Readlyn	Bremer	IA	42.7095°N 92.2892°W	0317–0324	5.41 mi (8.71 km)	100 yd (91 m)	$2,000	Crops were damaged.	

== September ==
Confirmed tornadoes by Enhanced Fujita rating
EFU	EF0	EF1	EF2	EF3	EF4	EF5	Total
0	22	17	3	0	0	0	42

=== September 1 event ===
List of confirmed tornadoes – Monday, September 1, 2014
EF#	Location	County / Parish	State	Start Coord.	Time (UTC)	Path length	Max width	Damage	Summary	Refs
EF1	NE of Kalkaska	Kalkaska	MI	44.83°N 85.05°W	1747–1758	4.02 mi (6.47 km)	125 yd (114 m)	$160,000	Damage was confined to broken or downed trees, some of which fell on residences, damaging the roofs.	
EF1	SW of Frederic	Crawford	MI	44.76°N 84.77°W	1816–1829	9.14 mi (14.71 km)	75 yd (69 m)	$85,000	Many trees were snapped or uprooted. A house and a barn sustained significant roof damage.	
EF1	SSW of Johannesburg	Otsego	MI	44.91°N 84.51°W	1842–1856	7.21 mi (11.60 km)	210 yd (190 m)	$215,000	A large number of trees were downed, several of which fell on residencies.	
EF0	SE of Wolverine	Cheboygan	MI	45.33°N 84.54°W	1843–1844	0.67 mi (1.08 km)	30 yd (27 m)	$20,000	A number of trees were snapped or uprooted.	
EF0	N of Welch	Craig	OK	36.9279°N 95.1°W	0041	0.2 mi (0.32 km)	50 yd (46 m)	$0	Brief tornado reported over open country; no reported damage.	
EF0	W of Cedar Vale	Cowley	KS	37.1237°N 96.7113°W	0101–0112	3.69 mi (5.94 km)	100 yd (91 m)	$0	Tornado moved over open country; no reported damage.	
EF1	SW of Cedar Vale	Chautauqua	KS	37.11°N 96.50°W	0125–0140	7.4 mi (11.9 km)	100 yd (91 m)	Unknown	A barn was completely collapsed while another lost a portion of its metal roofing. Several trees were damaged.	
EF1	WNW of House Springs	Jefferson	MO	38.4299°N 90.6635°W	0343–0355	6.4 mi (10.3 km)	60 yd (55 m)	Unknown	A quarter of the roof to a business was torn off while its deck was uplifted. Tree damage was observed.	
EF1	E of Saginaw	Newton	MO	37.02°N 94.45°W	0413–0414	2.22 mi (3.57 km)	100 yd (91 m)	$50,000	Numerous trees were snapped, uprooted, or thrown. At least one mobile home was severely damaged after a tree fell on it.	
EF1	E of Saginaw	Newton	MO	37.02°N 94.43°W	0414–0415	2.7 mi (4.3 km)	400 yd (370 m)	$0	Numerous trees were damaged and destroyed.	
EF0	NW of Wentworth	Newton	MO	37.02°N 94.43°W	0436–0437	1.24 mi (2.00 km)	100 yd (91 m)	$10,000	A barn and a few trees were damaged.	

=== September 2 event ===
List of confirmed tornadoes – Tuesday, September 2, 2014
EF#	Location	County / Parish	State	Start Coord.	Time (UTC)	Path length	Max width	Damage	Summary	Refs
EF1	NE of Mansfield	DeSoto, Red River	LA	32.15°N 93.58°W	1909–1924	6.04 mi (9.72 km)	350 yd (320 m)	$250,000	In DeSoto Parish, the metal roof of a barn, as well as the metal walls and roof of an International Paper Plant, were peeled back. A car was flipped over while several others had their windows blown out before the tornado entered Red River Parish. Numerous trees were snapped in both parishes.	
EF1	E of Elmira	Chemung	NY	42.10°N 76.69°W	2310–2315	6 mi (9.7 km)	150 yd (140 m)	$100,000	Numerous trees were snapped and uprooted. A barn was completely destroyed while a second one had its roof blown off. A pickup truck was lifted and dropped several feet from its original location and an attached trailer was dragged several feet. Several homes were damaged.	
EF1	W of Afton	Chenango	NY	42.23°N 75.62°W	0032–0038	0.1 mi (0.16 km)	50 yd (46 m)	$10,000	Numerous trees were snapped and uprooted.	

=== September 4 event ===
List of confirmed tornadoes – Thursday, September 4, 2014
EF#	Location	County / Parish	State	Start Coord.	Time (UTC)	Path length	Max width	Damage	Summary	Refs
EF0	Skandia Township	Barnes	ND	46.79°N 98.09°W	0826–0828	1.05 mi (1.69 km)	30 yd (27 m)	Unknown	Several large tree branches were broken; path evident in nearby field.	
EF1	Leonard	Cass	ND	46.65°N 97.25°W	0917–0945	11.64 mi (18.73 km)	250 yd (230 m)	Unknown	Numerous large trees were snapped or blown over. Brick facing and portions of the roof were blown off a building in Leonard.	
EF2	N of Rothsay	Otter Tail	MN	46.30°N 96.16°W	0948–0952	2.7 mi (4.3 km)	200 yd (180 m)	$20,000	Numerous large trees were downed. Shingles, roofing, and siding were ripped off a house.	
EF1	Newton Township	Otter Tail	MN	46.49°N 95.39°W	1042–1045	2 mi (3.2 km)	250 yd (230 m)	$3,000	A hayrack was overturned, numerous trees were downed, and a few power poles were snapped.	

=== September 6 event ===
List of confirmed tornadoes – Saturday, September 6, 2014
EF#	Location	County / Parish	State	Start Coord.	Time (UTC)	Path length	Max width	Damage	Summary	Refs
EF0	Grand Lake	Cameron	LA	29.9401°N 92.7596°W	1839–1845	0.01 mi (0.016 km)	10 yd (9.1 m)	$0	A waterspout briefly moved ashore before dissipating.	

=== September 7 event ===
List of confirmed tornadoes – Sunday, September 7, 2014
EF#	Location	County / Parish	State	Start Coord.	Time (UTC)	Path length	Max width	Damage	Summary	Refs
EF0	ESE of Vance	Orangeburg	SC	33.43°N 80.40°W	1827–1829	0.43 mi (0.69 km)	30 yd (27 m)	$8,000	A mobile home lost a majority of its roof and yard items around the home were damaged. Crop damage was observed.	

=== September 8 event ===
List of confirmed tornadoes – Monday, September 8, 2014
EF#	Location	County / Parish	State	Start Coord.	Time (UTC)	Path length	Max width	Damage	Summary	Refs
EF2	E of Greenevers	Duplin	NC	34.83°N 77.90°W	2045–2046	0.15 mi (0.24 km)	100 yd (91 m)	$200,000	A single family home and two manufactured homes were either heavily damaged or destroyed. Several cars at the residences were moved or flipped.	

=== September 9 event ===
List of confirmed tornadoes – Tuesday, September 9, 2014
EF#	Location	County / Parish	State	Start Coord.	Time (UTC)	Path length	Max width	Damage	Summary	Refs
EF1	E of Lorton	Otoe	NE	40.6237°N 95.9883°W	2129–2951	7.72 mi (12.42 km)	965 yd (882 m)	$150,000	Several outbuildings were damaged or destroyed. Tree, power line, and crop damage was observed.	
EF0	N of Tarkio	Atchison	MO	40.44°N 95.38°W	2250–2257	4.89 mi (7.87 km)	25 yd (23 m)	Unknown	Minimal damage reported.	
EF0	Maitland to E of Graham	Holt, Nodaway	MO	40.20°N 95.07°W	0010–0015	3.04 mi (4.89 km)	30 yd (27 m)	Unknown	Minor tree and power line damage was observed, including within the town of Graham.	
EF0	SW of Maitland	Holt	MO	40.1757°N 95.1212°W	0035–0036	0.08 mi (0.13 km)	25 yd (23 m)	$0	Brief tornado; no reported damage.	
EF0	SW of Maitland	Holt	MO	40.18°N 95.11°W	0040–0041	0.11 mi (0.18 km)	25 yd (23 m)	Unknown	Brief tornado; little to no damage.	
EF0	S of St. Peters	St. Charles	MO	38.75°N 90.61°W	0210–0215	1.69 mi (2.72 km)	25 yd (23 m)	$0	A couple of trees were uprooted and numerous tree limbs were snapped.	
EF0	Fairport	De Kalb	MO	39.9877°N 94.3508°W	0322–0323	0.75 mi (1.21 km)	25 yd (23 m)	Unknown	Several trees were downed throughout town, some of which landed on homes, inflicting minor damage to the roofs.	

=== September 10 event ===
List of confirmed tornadoes – Wednesday, September 10, 2014
EF#	Location	County / Parish	State	Start Coord.	Time (UTC)	Path length	Max width	Damage	Summary	Refs
EF1	Kirksville	Adair	MO	40.17°N 92.74°W	0740–0806	18.27 mi (29.40 km)	20 yd (18 m)	Unknown	Minor tree and structural damage was observed. Several power poles were snapped.	
EF0	Stow	Summit	OH	41.17°N 81.40°W	2122–2124	0.47 mi (0.76 km)	50 yd (46 m)	$100,000	The roof and chimney of a house was heavily damaged while four other homes lost portions of their roof or siding. Many trees were downed.	
EF0	Sugar Bush Knolls	Portage	OH	41.191°N 81.377°W	2129–2132	0.96 mi (1.54 km)	50 yd (46 m)	$40,000	Many trees were downed.	
EF0	Southwestern Streetsboro	Portage	OH	41.202°N 81.299°W	2134–2135	0.1 mi (0.16 km)	20 yd (18 m)	$5,000	A tree was downed and limbs were broken off a couple others at the southwestern fringes of town.	
EF0	NW of Hirma	Portage	OH	41.335°N 81.185°W	2154–2156	0.76 mi (1.22 km)	50 yd (46 m)	$15,000	A couple of homes sustained minor damage. A few trees were uprooted and many tree branches were broken.	

=== September 17 event ===
List of confirmed tornadoes – Wednesday, September 17, 2014
EF#	Location	County / Parish	State	Start Coord.	Time (UTC)	Path length	Max width	Damage	Summary	Refs
EF0	SE of Hasty	Newton, Searcy	AR	35.9894°N 92.9662°W	2038–2044	2.73 mi (4.39 km)	250 yd (230 m)	$35,000	Trees were snapped or uprooted.	

=== September 19 event ===
List of confirmed tornadoes – Friday, September 19, 2014
EF#	Location	County / Parish	State	Start Coord.	Time (UTC)	Path length	Max width	Damage	Summary	Refs
EF2	NW of Northcote	Kittson	MN	48.86°N 97.02°W	2319–2340	10 mi (16 km)	500 yd (460 m)	$700,000	Numerous trees were snapped or uprooted. Numerous power poles were snapped. Several farm outbuildings, steer grain bins, and a steel pole shed were completely destroyed. A wooden grain elevator was completely dismantled with portions of the lift thrown several dozen yards.	
EF1	W of Greenbush	Roseau	MN	48.70°N 96.38°W	0121–0136	7 mi (11 km)	300 yd (270 m)	$400,000	Numerous trees were snapped or uprooted. Two steel grain bins were destroyed and an addition three more were heavily damaged. Steel roofing panels and doors were blown off pole sheds and thrown several dozen yards.	

=== September 20 event ===
List of confirmed tornadoes – Saturday, September 20, 2014
EF#	Location	County / Parish	State	Start Coord.	Time (UTC)	Path length	Max width	Damage	Summary	Refs
EF0	SSE of Hickison Summit	Nye	NV	39.07°N 116.51°W	0000–0005	0.4 mi (0.64 km)	20 yd (18 m)	$0	Brief tornado photographed over a mountain range.	

=== September 21 event ===
List of confirmed tornadoes – Sunday, September 21, 2014
EF#	Location	County / Parish	State	Start Coord.	Time (UTC)	Path length	Max width	Damage	Summary	Refs
EF1	WNW of Rochester	Oakland	MI	42.70°N 83.19°W	0947–0959	1.23 mi (1.98 km)	150 yd (140 m)	$470,000	Several homes lost portions of their roofs and numerous trees were downed.	

=== September 27 event ===
List of confirmed tornadoes – Saturday, September 27, 2014
EF#	Location	County / Parish	State	Start Coord.	Time (UTC)	Path length	Max width	Damage	Summary	Refs
EF0	SE of Prescott	Yavapai	AZ	34.52°N 112.38°W	2055–2105	2.1 mi (3.4 km)	700 yd (640 m)	$500,000	Three homes were significantly damaged while others sustained minor damage. Numerous trees were snapped and uprooted.	

=== September 29 event ===
List of confirmed tornadoes – Monday, September 29, 2014
EF#	Location	County / Parish	State	Start Coord.	Time (UTC)	Path length	Max width	Damage	Summary	Refs
EF0	WNW of Delta	Delta	CO	38.7679°N 108.2396°W	1929–1932	0.19 mi (0.31 km)	25 yd (23 m)	$0	The public reported a tornado over open country.	
EF1	W of Chama	Rio Arriba	NM	36.89°N 106.73°W	2225–2235	2.26 mi (3.64 km)	700 yd (640 m)	$100,000	Hundreds of trees were twisted, snapped, or uprooted. A chapel was destroyed and a residence suffered complete removal of its roof. Several storage sheds were significantly damaged.	

=== September 30 event ===
List of confirmed tornadoes – Tuesday, September 30, 2014
EF#	Location	County / Parish	State	Start Coord.	Time (UTC)	Path length	Max width	Damage	Summary	Refs
EF0	NW of Long Lake	McPherson	SD	45.89°N 99.25°W	2145–2146	0.3 mi (0.48 km)	10 yd (9.1 m)	$0	Brief tornado; no reported damage.	

== See also ==
- Tornadoes of 2014
- List of United States tornadoes from June to July 2014
- List of United States tornadoes from October to December 2014
