= List of United States tornadoes from October to December 2014 =

This is a list of all tornadoes that were confirmed by local offices of the National Weather Service in the United States from October to December 2014. Based on the 1991–2010 averaging period, 61 tornadoes occur across the United States throughout October, 58 through November, and 24 through December.

Multiple outbreaks struck during October, the biggest of which occurred between October 13–15. The month finished above average with 73 tornadoes. In comparison, November saw only two small outbreaks and significantly below average with only 23 tornadoes. December featured the first tornado to strike Los Angeles in a decade as well as a deadly outbreak between December 23–24. The month finished near average with 20 tornadoes.

== United States yearly total ==
Confirmed tornadoes by Enhanced Fujita rating
EFU	EF0	EF1	EF2	EF3	EF4	EF5	Total
0	510	321	71	20	7	0	929

== October ==
Confirmed tornadoes by Enhanced Fujita rating
EFU	EF0	EF1	EF2	EF3	EF4	EF5	Total
0	25	44	4	0	0	0	73

=== October 2 event ===
List of confirmed tornadoes – Thursday, October 2, 2014 (Note: All dates are based on the local time zone where the tornado touched down; however, all times are in Coordinated Universal Time for consistency.)
EF#	Location	County / Parish	State	Start Coord.	Time (UTC)	Path length	Max width	Damage (Note: All damage totals are in 2014 USD unless otherwise stated.)	Summary	Refs
EF1	SE of Wrightsville to ENE of England	Pulaski, Lonoke	AR	34.5317°N 92.1162°W	0124–0134	12.71 mi (20.45 km)	300 yd (270 m)	$140,000	The tornado began in Pulaski County, Arkansas, felling trees and power lines, inflicting considerable damage to a home, and blowing thousands of corn husks off farm fields into roadside ditches. In Lonoke County, additional trees were blown down and a farm shop was destroyed, while a house, tractor shed, and second farm shop were damaged.	
EF1	NNE of Stuttgart to SE of Slovak	Prairie	AR	34.6272°N 91.5553°W	0155–0200	4.08 mi (6.57 km)	200 yd (180 m)	$20,000	A majority of the path was across open farm fields; however, several power poles were either knocked down or broken off.	
EF0	NE of Waldenburg	Poinsett	AR	35.5725°N 90.9038°W	0228–0232	0.7 mi (1.1 km)	33 yd (30 m)	$0	A rice field was damaged.	

=== October 3 event ===
List of confirmed tornadoes – Friday, October 3, 2014
EF#	Location	County / Parish	State	Start Coord.	Time (UTC)	Path length	Max width	Damage	Summary	Refs
EF1	S of Benton	Marshall	KY	36.8302°N 88.3529°W	0510–0511	0.38 mi (0.61 km)	125 yd (114 m)	$75,000	A tire business was destroyed, with loss of roof and a large portion of a block wall. Two outbuildings sustained roof and wall damage, two homes sustained fascia, siding, and shingle damage, two garages lost shingles, and windows were cracked at a church. Several trees were snapped.	
EF1	W of Hopkinsville	Christian	KY	36.8523°N 87.5913°W	0615–0617	1.36 mi (2.19 km)	110 yd (100 m)	$35,000	Half the roof and some rafters were removed from a tobacco barn, and a volunteer fire station had a large portion of its roof blown off. Several trees were downed as well.	
EF0	SE of Madison	Madison	AL	34.6881°N 86.7267°W	0812 - 0813	0.7 mi (1.1 km)	250 yd (230 m)	Unknown	A weak, intermittent tornado removed metal roofing from a walkway and a building, pushed a large, heavy air conditioning unit on the roof of a shopping center off its moorings and onto the parking lot below, and snapped trees in a church parking lot.	
EF1	NNE of Albertville	Marshall	AL	34.401°N 86.149°W	0902–0904	0.48 mi (0.77 km)	75 yd (69 m)	Unknown	A brief tornado destroyed a chicken house and severely damaged a second one, caused roof and siding damage to a house, and snapped several trees.	

=== October 6 event ===
List of confirmed tornadoes – Monday, October 6, 2014
EF#	Location	County / Parish	State	Start Coord.	Time (UTC)	Path length	Max width	Damage	Summary	Refs
EF1	W of Spiro	LeFlore	OK	35.2508°N 94.7246°W	0601–0602	0.8 mi (1.3 km)	75 yd (69 m)	$50,000	Two chicken houses sustained roof and wall damage, several trees were uprooted, and a number of tree limbs were snapped off.	
EF1	NNE of Grider	Cumberland	KY	36.8339°N 85.3973°W	2302–2303	0.17 mi (0.27 km)	100 yd (91 m)	$0	Approximately 200 trees were snapped or uprooted.	
EF1	N of Albany	Clinton	KY	36.842°N 85.1959°W	2313–2317	2.17 mi (3.49 km)	150 yd (140 m)	$3,000	Numerous trees were snapped or uprooted and a few power poles were damaged along U.S. Highway 127.	
EF1	N of Ringgold	Catoosa	GA	34.9304°N 85.1225°W	2340–2341	0.29 mi (0.47 km)	100 yd (91 m)	$300,000	Dozens of trees were snapped or uprooted. Seven homes sustained damage: one lost a section of its roof and an attic wall, a second had its garage doors blown out, and a third was considered uninhabitable.	

=== October 7 event ===
List of confirmed tornadoes – Tuesday, October 7, 2014
EF#	Location	County / Parish	State	Start Coord.	Time (UTC)	Path length	Max width	Damage	Summary	Refs
EF1	SSE of Westport	Oldham	KY	38.4602°N 85.4629°W	1850–1851	0.12 mi (190 m)	50 yd (46 m)	$20,000	Two trees were toppled and the limbs were snapped off several others, and damage was sustained to a barn and several outbuildings.	
EF1	New Columbus to N of Sadieville	Owen, Scott	KY	38.4618°N 84.691°W	1939–1950	12.13 mi (19.52 km)	150 yd (140 m)	$65,000	An outbuilding was destroyed, several homes sustained minor roof damage, with windows blown out as well, and a porch was lifted from a home and thrown to an unknown location. The tornado then became intermittent, with several outbuildings destroyed and several homes sustaining minor roof damage. Barns and more homes sustained roof damage before the tornado moved into Scott County, where it destroyed an above-ground pool and ripped a porch from a house, throwing it over the top and causing roof damage. Many trees were downed along the path in both counties.	
EF1	NNE of Stamping Ground	Scott	KY	38.2846°N 84.6896°W	1948–1950	2.79 mi (4.49 km)	150 yd (140 m)	$0	Three outbuildings were destroyed and several homes sustained minor to moderate roof and siding damage. Numerous trees were downed as well.	
EF1	NNW of Georgetown	Scott	KY	38.2921°N 84.6292°W	1949–1952	3.55 mi (5.71 km)	150 yd (140 m)	$50,000	An outbuilding and a couple small barns were destroyed, a couple of homes sustained roof damage, and several trees were snapped.	
EF1	SW of Cynthiana	Harrison	KY	38.3789°N 84.358°W	2005–2010	3.66 mi (5.89 km)	275 yd (251 m)	$250,000	Numerous trees were snapped, uprooted, or sheered off, portions of a corn field were flattened, four outbuildings, two sheds, and three barns were damaged or destroyed, and a garage sustained significant roof damage.	
EF1	Paris	Bourbon	KY	38.2016°N 84.256°W	2012–2015	1.67 mi (2.69 km)	60 yd (55 m)	$250,000	The tornado touched down twice in town, with numerous homes and two warehouses sustaining significant roof, wall, attic, soffit, and siding damage. An empty tractor-trailer was flipped, and numerous trees and power lines were downed, with several trees falling on houses.	
EF1	NNW of Sharpsburg	Bath	KY	38.2059°N 83.9386°W	2035–2036	0.6 mi (0.97 km)	50 yd (46 m)	Unknown	Three barns were damaged, and sporadic tree damage was observed.	
EF1	NE of Olympia Springs	Bath	KY	38.0696°N 83.6598°W	2053–2054	0.3 mi (0.48 km)	35 yd (32 m)	Unknown	A boat trailer harboring a boat was overturned, and a camping trailer was blown onto a truck. Numerous shingles were blown off a house, and sporadic tree damage was observed.	
EF0	SE of Cloverdale	Putnam	IN	39.5006°N 86.7748°W	2235–2236	0.1 mi (160 m)	50 yd (46 m)	$2,000	A couple trees were damaged, and an Emergency Manager spotted corn stalks lofted.	
EF2	Odd area	Raleigh	WV	37.6014°N 81.2012°W	0241–0245	3.01 mi (4.84 km)	150 yd (140 m)	$275,000	A well-built garage or outbuilding was completely destroyed, about 10 to 20 houses sustained minor roof and porch damage, and a few barns and outbuildings were damaged. Numerous trees were snapped, sheared off, or felled, destroying at least two vehicles. A parked school bus had its front window broken and around 20 power poles were damaged, cutting power to several hundred customers.	
EF1	SW of Gulnare	Pike	KY	37.6127°N 82.5941°W	0244–0245	0.1 mi (160 m)	130 yd (120 m)	Unknown	A large section of roof was peeled off of a house, two barns sustained roof damage, and several large trees were snapped or uprooted.	
EF1	NE of Matoaka	Mercer	WV	37.4533°N 81.2164°W	0339–0349	5.54 mi (8,920 m)	180 yd (160 m)	$175,000 (estimated)	Numerous trees were snapped or downed, four homes and a shed sustained minor damage, and a mobile home was severely damaged.	

=== October 9 event ===
List of confirmed tornadoes – Thursday, October 9, 2014
EF#	Location	County / Parish	State	Start Coord.	Time (UTC)	Path length	Max width	Damage	Summary	Refs
EF1	S of Kings Mill	Gray	TX	35.4213°N 101.0445°W	0210–0222	7.03 mi (11.31 km)	125 yd (114 m)	$0	Three homesteads were damaged, consisting of roof damage and the destruction of an anchored porch to a manufactured home. Metal poles were thrown into the structure. A large tree was blown onto a neighboring house, damaging the roof. A flag pole was bent, an outbuilding was destroyed, several round hay bales were blown around, one of which damaged a fence, and several power poles were snapped, disrupting service to several hundred customers.	

=== October 10 event ===
List of confirmed tornadoes – Friday, October 10, 2014
EF#	Location	County / Parish	State	Start Coord.	Time (UTC)	Path length	Max width	Damage	Summary	Refs
EF1	NE of Centerville	Hickman	TN	35.8594°N 87.3851°W	0135–0139	1.97 mi (3.17 km)	100 yd (91 m)	$200,000	One home sustained minor siding damage and a second suffered partial roof loss and broken windows. A carport, garage, and outbuilding near the second home were destroyed, with debris blown about 100 yd (91 m) to the east into a stand of trees. Additionally, an RV was overturned, another carport was destroyed, and another home lost part of its roof. Further along the path, a fourth house was pushed off of its cinder-block foundation and another garage was destroyed, with debris blown through fields to the east. Many trees were downed along the path.	

=== October 13 event ===
List of confirmed tornadoes – Monday, October 13, 2014
EF#	Location	County / Parish	State	Start Coord.	Time (UTC)	Path length	Max width	Damage	Summary	Refs
EF1	NNW of Gilmer	Upshur	TX	32.7681°N 95.0456°W	0952–1000	5.8 mi (9.3 km)	275 yd (251 m)	$1,000,000	Numerous trees were snapped or uprooted, some of which caused significant damage to homes, and several barns sustained substantial damage.	
EF1	SW of Rocky to E of Mountain Fork	Polk	AR	34.5766°N 94.3911°W	1004–1010	3.66 mi (5.89 km)	300 yd (270 m)	$50,000	A pole barn was blown down, hundreds of trees were uprooted, and power lines were felled.	
EF1	N of Hindsville	Madison	AR	36.1783°N 93.8792°W	1019–1022	3 mi (4.8 km)	375 yd (343 m)	$150,000	A couple outbuildings were destroyed, several homes sustained roof damage, and numerous trees and tree limbs were snapped or uprooted.	
EF2	W of Ashdown	Little River	AR	33.6617°N 94.2303°W	1037–1042	2.51 mi (4.04 km)	400 yd (370 m)	$200,000	1 death – A strong tornado destroyed a mobile home, killing one of the five occupants, damaged another, and snapped or uprooted numerous trees.	
EF0	WSW of Wilton	Little River	AR	33.7279°N 94.2339°W	1043–1044	0.09 mi (140 m)	50 yd (46 m)	$10,000	A brief tornado snapped several trees and destroyed a poorly constructed barn.	
EF1	ENE of Blue Eye	Stone	MO	36.5048°N 93.39°W	1125–1126	0.09 mi (0.14 km)	75 yd (69 m)	$5,000	Several outbuildings were damaged, a home sustained minor damage, and multiple trees were uprooted.	
EF0	N of Chesapeake	Lawrence	MO	37.1593°N 93.6799°W	1158–1200	0.07 mi (0.11 km)	50 yd (46 m)	$5,000	A brief tornado caused roof damage to a home and structural damage to an outbuilding.	
EF0	NNW of Ash Grove	Greene	MO	37.3537°N 93.6061°W	1220–1221	0.43 mi (690 m)	100 yd (91 m)	$0	Several trees were damaged or uprooted.	
EF1	Griffithtown	Clark	AR	34.0405°N 92.9554°W	1240–1245	3.32 mi (5.34 km)	250 yd (230 m)	$150,000	Several outbuildings were either damaged or destroyed, and hundreds of trees were either snapped or uprooted, with several falling on a house.	
EF1	S of Mansfield	DeSoto	LA	31.9764°N 93.6991°W	1400–1402	0.9 mi (1.4 km)	200 yd (180 m)	$0	Numerous trees were snapped or uprooted.	
EF1	NW of England	Lonoke	AR	34.5441°N 92.0074°W	1427–1432	3.31 mi (5.33 km)	150 yd (140 m)	$75,000	A portion of a metal roof was pulled from a large tractor shed, an old farm shop was flattened, a house sustained damage, with its walls pushed in, pool damaged, yard ornaments tossed, and fence blown down, and a large intermodal shipping container was flipped onto its side.	
EF1	SW of West Monroe	Ouachita	LA	32.4375°N 92.2781°W	1611–1613	0.7 mi (1.1 km)	225 yd (206 m)	$250,000	Numerous trees were snapped, causing damage to several homes.	
EF2	SW of Claiborne to Northeast Monroe	Ouachita	LA	32.4921°N 92.2421°W	1616–1627	9.05 mi (14.56 km)	300 yd (270 m)	$3,750,000	Numerous trees were snapped or uprooted, many of which caused damage to vehicles and structures. After entering West Monroe, the tornado inflicted roof damage to many homes and businesses, and many business signs and power poles were damaged or blown down. West Monroe High School sustained significant roof damage to several of its building. In Monroe, heavy damage was inflicted to the second roof of an apartment complex and additional homes sustained damage, some of which was severe.	
EF0	McDougal	Clay	AR	36.439°N 90.3982°W	1748–1749	0.87 mi (1.40 km)	100 yd (91 m)	$150,000	The tornado removed approximately half the roof from a mobile home, damaged four houses, and knocked down several trees, a few of which fell onto homes.	
EF0	W of Ruma	Randolph	IL	38.1272°N 90.0143°W	1759–1800	0.29 mi (470 m)	50 yd (46 m)	$0	A barn had a portion of its roof removed and one of its walls blown out, several other buildings sustained minor to moderate roof damage, and two large trees were snapped, one of which caused minor roof damage to a house.	
EF1	NW of Freeburg to SE of Belleville	St. Clair	IL	38.4703°N 89.9263°W	1824–1827	1.38 mi (2.22 km)	100 yd (91 m)	$0	A few trees were downed.	
EF1	W of Puxico to NW of Sturdivant	Stoddard, Bollinger	MO	36.9498°N 90.1113°W	1830–1843	9.35 mi (15.05 km)	75 yd (69 m)	$53,000	Numerous trees were snapped or uprooted along the path, with several falling on a house and power lines.	
EF1	W of New Baden	St. Clair	IL	38.5363°N 89.7248°W	1843–1844	0.25 mi (400 m)	50 yd (46 m)	$0	A couple of outbuildings were destroyed.	
EF1	E of Zalma	Bollinger	MO	37.1193°N 90.0415°W	1845–1858	7.16 mi (11.52 km)	100 yd (91 m)	$250,000	Two small barns and a few silos were destroyed, a mobile home was shifted off of its foundation, a residence had the roof of its front porch blown over the house, and another home sustained mainly window damage. A carport collapsed onto vehicles, and numerous trees were snapped or uprooted.	
EF1	NW of Leopold	Bollinger	MO	37.2423°N 89.9396°W	1902–1904	2 mi (3.2 km)	50 yd (46 m)	$20,000	A few barns were damaged, one of which had its roof buckled, debris was thrown across a yard, and several trees were snapped or uprooted.	
EF2	ENE of Moweaqua	Shelby, Macon	IL	39.65°N 88.95°W	2054–2107	10 mi (16 km)	200 yd (180 m)	$510,000	Two machine sheds and several outbuildings were destroyed, a house sustained significant roof and window damage, with the attached garage being damaged, and a barn suffered roof damage. Areas of corn were either flattened or bent in different directions, and numerous trees were snapped just above the base.	
EF1	ENE of Dix to E of Kell	Jefferson, Marion	IL	38.4443°N 88.9185°W	2106–2112	3.52 mi (5.66 km)	100 yd (91 m)	$10,000	Shingles were blown off of a mobile home and patio furniture was blown about 25 yards (23 m) in all directions. A carport was destroyed, an outbuilding lost part of its roof, corn was flattened, and many trees were snapped or uprooted.	
EF1	NNW of Bluford	Jefferson	IL	38.3715°N 88.7566°W	2107–2108	0.66 mi (1.06 km)	50 yd (46 m)	$50,000	Brief tornado peeled up the metal roof of a barn, damaged a house's roof, and destroyed a second barn. It also pushed up metal chairs along a railing near the house and downed trees and power lines.	
EF1	S of Decatur Airport	Macon	IL	39.8184°N 88.88°W	2112–2113	0.2 mi (320 m)	50 yd (46 m)	$10,000	A brief tornado touched down near the intersection of Illinois Route 121 and U.S. Highway 36, where a traffic signal mast was rotated about 90 degrees and broken, a shed and dumpster were overturned at an Arby's, two trees were snapped off at a McDonald's, and power lines were downed.	
EF0	WNW of Scotts Ferry	Calhoun	FL	30.287°N 85.1792°W	2120–2125	2.58 mi (4.15 km)	30 yd (27 m)	$0	Approximately 30 trees were snapped or uprooted.	
EF0	NE of Argenta	Macon	IL	40.0188°N 88.7722°W	2129–2133	2.75 mi (4.43 km)	50 yd (46 m)	$0	The tornado remained in open fields; no damage occurred.	
EF0	NW of Hamilton	Marion	AL	34.208°N 88.1077°W	2143–2152	6.01 mi (9.67 km)	50 yd (46 m)	$0	A weak tornado uprooted numerous trees, one of which fell on a church, and peeled back the tin roof of a shed.	
EF1	E of New Harmony	Posey	IN	38.0981°N 87.9087°W	2225–2231	3.75 mi (6.04 km)	150 yd (140 m)	$30,000	The tin roof was blown off a barn, and many trees were snapped or uprooted.	
EF1	ESE of Clarksville	Montgomery	TN	36.5001°N 87.2952°W	2309–2315	4.18 mi (6.73 km)	75 yd (69 m)	$50,000	Several homes sustained roof and tree damage and several trees were downed along the path. This was the first October tornado in Montgomery County since reliable records began in 1950.	
EF0	N of Beaverton	Lamar	AL	34.0087°N 88.001°W	2348–2350	1.08 mi (1.74 km)	150 yd (140 m)	$0	The tornado tracked over mainly forest and open farm land, snapping or uprooting 20 to 30 trees.	
EF0	WNW of Hays Place	Franklin	FL	29.89°N 84.91°W	0029	0.01 mi (0.016 km)	20 yd (18 m)	$0	Several trees were downed.	
EF1	Downtown Tuscumbia to Muscle Shoals	Colbert	AL	34.7318°N 87.7029°W	0029–0033	3.48 mi (5.60 km)	200 yd (180 m)	Unknown	Homes, businesses, and a church sustained structural damage, roofing was peeled off of a used car dealership and gas station and thrown across the street, power poles were bent and snapped, and numerous awnings were either damaged or destroyed. Road signs were blown down, traffic lights were damaged, and numerous trees were snapped or uprooted.	
EF0	E of Sumatra	Liberty	FL	30.01°N 84.91°W	0050	0.01 mi (0.016 km)	20 yd (18 m)	$0	The tornado caused EF0 damage to trees.	
EF0	N of Sumatra	Liberty	FL	30.02°N 84.98°W	0159–0201	2.07 mi (3.33 km)	20 yd (18 m)	$5,000 (estimated)	The roof was blown off a shed, and trees were blown down.	
EF0	SSE of Central City	Liberty	FL	30.14°N 84.91°W	0258	0.01 mi (0.016 km)	20 yd (18 m)	$0	The tornado tracked through the Apalachicola National Forest, damaging trees.	

=== October 14 event ===
List of confirmed tornadoes – Tuesday, October 14, 2014
EF#	Location	County / Parish	State	Start Coord.	Time (UTC)	Path length	Max width	Damage	Summary	Refs
EF0	E of Cottondale	Jackson	FL	30.78°N 85.36°W	0800–0803	1.73 mi (2.78 km)	20 yd (18 m)	$20,000 (estimated)	A house had a garage door blown in and part of its roof removed, and tree damage was observed.	
EF1	SW of Shiloh to W of Manchester	Harris, Talbot, Meriwether	GA	32.80°N 84.71°W	0840–0848	5.86 mi (9.43 km)	200 yd (180 m)	$55,000	The tornado began in Harris County, Georgia, tracking into Talbot County before dissipating in Meriwether County. A home lost a portion of its roof and several others sustained minor damage, a large shed was destroyed, and approximately 100 trees were snapped or uprooted.	
EF0	W of College Park	Fulton	GA	33.65°N 84.54°W	0915–0920	2.99 mi (4.81 km)	75 yd (69 m)	$10,000	The tornado snapped or uprooted trees.	
EF0	NW of East Point	Fulton	GA	33.68°N 84.46°W	0920–0928	2.63 mi (4.23 km)	75 yd (69 m)	$10,000	Damage was confined mainly to snapped or uprooted trees.	
EF0	SSE of Vinings	Fulton	GA	33.85°N 84.46°W	0933–0938	1.07 mi (1.72 km)	75 yd (69 m)	$40,000	Several homes sustained damage from snapped or uprooted trees.	
EF1	SSE of Sandy Springs	Cobb, Fulton	GA	33.99°N 84.40°W	0943–0950	1.25 mi (2.01 km)	100 yd (91 m)	$75,000	Damage was confined to snapped or uprooted trees, some of which caused damage to homes.	
EF1	W of Alpharetta to NE of Milton	Fulton, Forsyth	GA	34.08°N 84.33°W	0955–1010	7.51 mi (12.09 km)	100 yd (91 m)	$95,000	Numerous large trees were snapped or uprooted, some of which caused damage to homes.	
EF0	WNW of Westminster	Oconee	SC	34.68°N 83.21°W	1211–1212	0.89 mi (1.43 km)	100 yd (91 m)	$0	A couple dozen trees were uprooted.	
EF0	SW of Landrum	Greenville	SC	35.12°N 82.24°W	0000–0002	1 mi (1.6 km)	50 yd (46 m)	$1,000	The roof was blown off a shed, and numerous trees were felled.	
EF0	SSW of Marion	McDowell	NC	35.55°N 82.07°W	0048–0049	0.5 mi (800 m)	100 yd (91 m)	$20,000	A portion of a barn's roof was blown off and thrown about 100 yards (91 m), a small shed was moved about 8 feet (2.4 m) off of its foundation and had its roof blown off, a carport at an equipment dealership was thrown over 200 yards (180 m) and destroyed, heavy motors and parts were thrown off of shelves in other carports at the dealership, a 70-pound (32 kg) piece of steel was thrown about 50 feet (15 m), and a barn that was under construction had scaffolding blown out of its doors and scattered different directions. Additionally, a small enclosed trailer was moved and hit by flying debris, an open-bed trailer was flipped and severely damaged, several trees were downed, and a hedge row and part of a corn field were flattened.	

=== October 15 event ===
List of confirmed tornadoes – Wednesday, October 15, 2014
EF#	Location	County / Parish	State	Start Coord.	Time (UTC)	Path length	Max width	Damage	Summary	Refs
EF0	Belle Haven to Alexandria	Fairfax, City of Alexandria	VA	38.780°N 77.060°W	1623–1626	2.32 mi (3.73 km)	75 yd (69 m)	Unknown	A tree was downed, and several large tree limbs were snapped.	
EF0	Savage	Howard	MD	39.128°N 76.829°W	1713–1714	0.3 mi (480 m)	75 yd (69 m)	Unknown	A large tree was uprooted and downed, damaging the south-facing side of an apartment complex, other large tree branches were snapped off trees, and a street sign was snapped.	

=== October 23 event ===
List of confirmed tornadoes – Thursday, October 23, 2014
EF#	Location	County / Parish	State	Start Coord.	Time (UTC)	Path length	Max width	Damage	Summary	Refs
EF1	Longview	Cowlitz	WA	46.13°N 122.9457°W	1940–1950	1.3 mi (2.1 km)	66 yd (60 m)	$182,000	Industrial buildings sustained significant roof damage, homes suffered minor roof damage, 30 to 35 trees and some power poles were snapped or downed, and vehicles were damaged by flying debris as the tornado passed near the Cowlitz River.	

== November ==
Confirmed tornadoes by Enhanced Fujita rating
EFU	EF0	EF1	EF2	EF3	EF4	EF5	Total
0	7	14	2	0	0	0	23

=== November 16 event ===
List of confirmed tornadoes – Sunday, November 16, 2014
EF#	Location	County / Parish	State	Start Coord.	Time (UTC)	Path length	Max width	Damage	Summary	Refs
EF0	SW of Walker	Livingston	LA	30.4023°N 90.9214°W	0148–0150	1.12 mi (1.80 km)	100 yd (91 m)	$5,000	Shingles were removed from some roofs, and a few small trees were snapped.	
EF1	N of Livingston	Livingston	LA	30.5597°N 90.7428°W	0211–0222	3.87 mi (6.23 km)	300 yd (270 m)	$2,000	Several pine trees were snapped at the base.	
EF1	E of Laurel	Jones	MS	31.683°N 88.9929°W	0227–0232	2.65 mi (4.26 km)	100 yd (91 m)	$45,000	A barn and the roof of a chicken house were heavily damaged, a mobile home was blown off of its blocks, and two power poles were snapped around U.S. Highway 84. Numerous trees and large tree limbs were downed as well.	

=== November 17 event ===
List of confirmed tornadoes – Monday, November 17, 2014
EF#	Location	County / Parish	State	Start Coord.	Time (UTC)	Path length	Max width	Damage	Summary	Refs
EF1	NW of Marion	Perry	AL	32.699°N 87.4659°W	0711–0715	3.53 mi (5.68 km)	300 yd (270 m)	$0	Numerous unsecured objects around a home were tossed into the woods, and numerous trees were snapped or uprooted.	
EF1	ESE of Chatom to SW of Grove Hill	Washington, Clarke	AL	31.4418°N 88.1545°W	0737–0810	21.9 mi (35.2 km)	150 yd (140 m)	$250,000	A house sustained minor roof damage and broken windows, a poorly constructed barn was severely damaged, three campers were flipped at a hunting camp, and a chicken coop was damaged. Many trees were downed, with one falling on a mobile home and another on a site-built home.	
EF0	N of Laguna Beach	Bay	FL	30.3°N 85.92°W	0851	0.01 mi (0.016 km)	50 yd (46 m)	$0	A brief tornado was observed using dual polarization radar; no structural damage was reported.	
EF1	Southern Georgiana	Butler	AL	31.6093°N 86.7471°W	0959–1005	5.89 mi (9.48 km)	150 yd (140 m)	$100,000	A few shed and outbuildings were destroyed, a couple homes sustained minor shingle damage, and a couple of mobile homes sustained minor structural damage. Many trees and power lines were downed as well, with a few trees causing heavy damage to two cars.	
EF2	SSW of Blountstown to ENE of Sycamore	Calhoun, Liberty, Gadsden	FL	30.4025°N 85.0746°W	1017–1049	22.21 mi (35.74 km)	420 yd (380 m)	$2,050,000	Several concrete buildings were heavily damaged at the Calhoun Correctional Institution, including a two-story printing facility, the eastern wall of which was completely collapsed and the roof almost entirely removed. Another concrete building had large sections of its roof removed and other buildings, including some warehouses, were also damaged. Over 30 cars in the prison parking lot were damaged, with some being tossed or rolled 50 to 100 yards (46 to 91 m). Several objects were driven into the ground near the prison, a screwdriver was driven into the bottom of a flipped vehicle, and some concrete curbs along the parking lot were ripped from the ground. Elsewhere, a few homes suffered minor exterior damage, and many trees and power poles were downed. Debris from the tornado was thrown into the Apalachicola River.	
EF1	W of Rutledge to WSW of Inverness	Crenshaw, Pike, Bullock	AL	31.7369°N 86.4303°W	1025–1117	40.73 mi (65.55 km)	500 yd (460 m)	$285,000	A double-wide mobile home was shifted off its blocks, several chicken houses were destroyed, and a home sustained minor shingle damage and broken windows. Many trees were downed, a few of which caused significant damage to several homes.	
EF0	Grand Ridge area	Jackson	FL	30.699°N 85.0191°W	1157–1158	0.5 mi (0.80 km)	50 yd (46 m)	$5,000 (estimated)	Three mobile homes were damaged.	
EF1	E of Pittsview	Russell	AL	32.199°N 85.0592°W	1224–1225	0.22 mi (350 m)	100 yd (91 m)	$0	A brief tornado snapped or downed many trees and a few power lines.	
EF1	SE of Mount Olive	Twiggs	GA	32.5567°N 83.3719°W	1457–1459	0.05 mi (0.080 km)	100 yd (91 m)	$15,000	A single-wide mobile home was destroyed, a barn was damaged, and several trees were downed.	
EF0	S of Sanderson	Baker	FL	30.1447°N 82.2818°W	1800–1810	0.8 mi (1.3 km)	75 yd (69 m)	$15,000 (estimated)	Several trees were snapped and uprooted, a shed was destroyed, and power lines in addition to a carport sustained damage.	

=== November 23 event ===
List of confirmed tornadoes – Sunday, November 23, 2014
EF#	Location	County / Parish	State	Start Coord.	Time (UTC)	Path length	Max width	Damage	Summary	Refs
EF0	E of Forkland	Greene	AL	32.6387°N 87.8364°W	1735–1738	2.05 mi (3.30 km)	150 yd (140 m)	$0	Several trees were snapped or uprooted.	
EF1	Walter F. George Lake to W of Union	Barbour (AL), Stewart (GA)	AL, GA	31.9603°N 85.094°W	2003–2027	16.72 mi (26.91 km)	400 yd (370 m)	$25,000	The tornado began in Barbour County, Alabama, snapping or uprooting hundreds of trees. Additional trees were damaged in Stewart County, Georgia before the tornado lifted.	
EF1	SSW of Lumpkin	Stewart	GA	32.0315°N 84.8078°W	2027–2029	0.47 mi (0.76 km)	100 yd (91 m)	$5,000	Tree damage was observed.	
EF1	W of Cusseta to N of Juniper	Chattahoochee, Marion, Talbot	GA	32.2982°N 84.7905°W	2037–2057	21.08 mi (33.92 km)	75 yd (69 m)	$32,500	The tornado began in Chattahoochee County, Georgia, entering Marion County before dissipating in Talbot County. Numerous trees were snapped or uprooted in all three counties.	
EF0	S of Talbotton	Talbot	GA	32.615°N 84.5513°W	2101–2105	3.16 mi (5.09 km)	50 yd (46 m)	$5,000	The tornado produced mainly tree damage before lifting.	
EF2	Western Thomaston to Piedmont	Upson, Lamar	GA	32.8945°N 84.3502°W	2120–2136	10.98 mi (17.67 km)	200 yd (180 m)	$45,000	A strong tornado began in Upson County, Georgia, snapping or uprooting numerous trees and destroying a small residential leasing office. Additional tree damage was observed in Lamar County.	
EF1	NW of Dyas to Juliette	Monroe	GA	32.8818°N 84.0179°W	2140–2201	20.02 mi (32.22 km)	70 yd (64 m)	$30,000	Many trees were snapped or uprooted, one of which fell on a home. A barn was collapsed while another had a portion of its roof peeled off. A shed was destroyed.	
EF0	S of Milner	Monroe	GA	33.0747°N 84.2059°W	2140–2144	1.44 mi (2.32 km)	40 yd (37 m)	$10,000	Numerous trees were snapped or uprooted, and a metal building had its roof and wall panels blown off.	
EF1	ENE of Liberty Hill to SSW of Stewart	Lamar, Butts, Newton	GA	33.1532°N 84.1128°W	2149–2214	21.55 mi (34.68 km)	100 yd (91 m)	$32,000	A long-tracked tornado began in Lamar County, Georgia, snapping or uprooting numerous trees. In Butts County, additional trees were damaged, and roof panels were removed from small outbuildings. In Newton County, additional trees were snapped or uprooted.	
EF1	NNE of Sugar Hill to E of Klondike	Houston, Pulaski	GA	32.3152°N 83.6336°W	2210–2217	6.4 mi (10.3 km)	50 yd (46 m)	$55,000	Shingles were ripped from a home, an above-ground pool was destroyed, a tied-down double wide was pushed off of its foundation, with its roof peeled off as well, a shed was overturned, another shed was damaged, and another house had windows blown out. Additionally, trees were downed, a fence was damaged, and a boat was tossed over 100 feet (30 m) into a cotton field.	

== December ==
Confirmed tornadoes by Enhanced Fujita rating
EFU	EF0	EF1	EF2	EF3	EF4	EF5	Total
0	12	4	3	1	0	0	20

=== December 12 event ===
List of confirmed tornadoes – Friday, December 12, 2014
EF#	Location	County / Parish	State	Start Coord.	Time (UTC)	Path length	Max width	Damage	Summary	Refs
EF0	South Los Angeles	Los Angeles	CA	33.9823°N 118.2913°W	1720–1725	0.73 mi (1.17 km)	10 yd (9.1 m)	$0	A weak tornado near the Augustus F. Hawkins High School in the Vermont-Slauson district of South Los Angeles caused roof damage to two homes and an apartment complex, in addition to damaging a steel billboard and downing trees.	

=== December 14 event ===
List of confirmed tornadoes – Sunday, December 14, 2014
EF#	Location	County / Parish	State	Start Coord.	Time (UTC)	Path length	Max width	Damage	Summary	Refs
EF0	SW of Arcadia	Oklahoma	OK	35.62°N 97.38°W	2309–2310	0.17 mi (0.27 km)	50 yd (46 m)	$0	A brief tornado was observed; no damage occurred.	
EF0	NE of Harper	Harper	KS	37.2915°N 98.0097°W	2338–2346	5.98 mi (9.62 km)	100 yd (91 m)	$0	Several trees and tree limbs were downed, and a large hay bale was rolled across a road.	

=== December 15 event ===
List of confirmed tornadoes – Monday, December 15, 2014
EF#	Location	County / Parish	State	Start Coord.	Time (UTC)	Path length	Max width	Damage	Summary	Refs
EF0	SW of Mize	Smith	MS	31.8276°N 89.6172°W	2302–2306	1.53 mi (2.46 km)	50 yd (46 m)	$6,000	Several trees and tree limbs were snapped, and a chicken house sustained roof damage.	
EF0	NNE of Bovina	Warren	MS	32.3668°N 90.7339°W	2356–0000	1.17 mi (1.88 km)	75 yd (69 m)	$12,000	A mobile home was damaged, a site-built home sustained minor roof damage, and a few trees and power lines were downed.	
EF0	ESE of Tylertown	Walthall	MS	31.0936°N 90.0188°W	0518–0523	1.33 mi (2.14 km)	150 yd (140 m)	$0	A barn and several chicken coops were damaged.	

=== December 23 event ===
List of confirmed tornadoes – Tuesday, December 23, 2014
EF#	Location	County / Parish	State	Start Coord.	Time (UTC)	Path length	Max width	Damage	Summary	Refs
EF0	SW of Valdosta	Lowndes	GA	30.77°N 83.33°W	1858–1900	0.1 mi (0.16 km)	25 yd (23 m)	$0	A fire department reported a brief tornado; no known structural damage occurred.	
EF2	E of Amite	Tangipahoa	LA	39.7289°N 90.4799°W	1919–1928	4.62 mi (7.44 km)	150 yd (140 m)	$400,000	Numerous homes had varying degrees of roof damage, an unanchored 12 by 24 ft (3.7 by 7.3 m) shed was pushed off of its foundation, and another outbuilding was completely destroyed. One home suffered a wall collapse, two travel trailers were moved about 50 yards (46 m) and destroyed, and many trees were downed as well. Most damage was at EF1-strength, with a few small areas of EF2 damage.	
EF3	S of Columbia to ESE of Improve	Marion	MS	31.23°N 89.83°W	2020–2036	12.51 mi (20.13 km)	880 yd (800 m)	$25,000,000	3 deaths – A rain-wrapped, very high-end EF3 tornado moved through southern and eastern fringes of Columbia, along U.S. Highway 98, either heavily damaging or destroying numerous businesses, industrial buildings, homes, mobile homes, and a National Guard building. The most intense damage was inflicted to a well-built, but small home that was almost completely leveled and largely reduced to its concrete slab foundation. Many trees and power poles were downed as well. Two fatalities occurred at a mobile home in a mobile home park, and the other occurred at a strip mall that was badly damaged. The tornado lifted just before reaching the Lamar County line. 50 people were injured.	
EF0	Southwest Sumrall	Lamar	MS	31.4143°N 89.5509°W	2045	0.06 mi (0.097 km)	50 yd (46 m)	$2,500	A brief tornado removed the tin roof from a daycare center and knocked down several large tree limbs.	
EF0	ENE of Sumrall	Lamar	MS	31.4247°N 89.5358°W	2046–2047	0.24 mi (0.39 km)	50 yd (46 m)	$23,000	A brief tornado caused minor roof damage to twelve homes in a subdivision. Several fences were damaged and two trees were downed as well.	
EF2	NW of Laurel	Jones	MS	31.6986°N 89.2239°W	2122–2127	5.89 mi (9.48 km)	350 yd (320 m)	$2,200,000	2 deaths – Numerous homes and a large barn received roof damage, a small and frail wood-frame home was moved off of its foundation and leveled, and a large wooden shed and a mobile home were completely destroyed, with the undercarriage of the mobile home being thrown a considerable distance. Many trees and power lines and portions of a wooden fence were downed.	
EF0	ENE of Crandall	Clarke	MS	32.0005°N 88.4854°W	2227–2229	0.49 mi (0.79 km)	100 yd (91 m)	$7,000	A brief tornado near the Alabama state line blew away a mobile home skirting and broke off a few trees and tree limbs.	

=== December 24 event ===
List of confirmed tornadoes – Wednesday, December 24, 2014
EF#	Location	County / Parish	State	Start Coord.	Time (UTC)	Path length	Max width	Damage	Summary	Refs
EF1	SSW of Castle Hayne	New Hanover	NC	34.3124°N 77.917°W	1530–1531	0.2 mi (0.32 km)	25 yd (23 m)	$60,000	A brief tornado near exit 17 on the south side of Interstate 140 north of Wrightsboro damaged a house, destroyed a large shed, moved a boxcar-type storage structure, and downed several trees.	
EF1	Bristol	Pierce	GA	31.406°N 82.251°W	1750–1754	5.69 mi (9.16 km)	100 yd (91 m)	Unknown	Trees were snapped, power lines were downed, and approximately seven homes sustained damage.	
EF0	WNW of Lancaster	Fairfield	OH	39.728°N 82.634°W	2216–2217	0.63 mi (1.01 km)	30 yd (27 m)	$15,000	A brief tornado near a shopping mall damaged a travel trailer, flipped a pickup truck, and blew windows out of several other vehicles. A storage building sustained roof damage and several trees and power poles were broken off as well.	

=== December 27 event ===
List of confirmed tornadoes – Saturday, December 27, 2014
EF#	Location	County / Parish	State	Start Coord.	Time (UTC)	Path length	Max width	Damage	Summary	Refs
EF0	ESE of Shepherd	Liberty	TX	30.3853°N 94.7823°W	1912–1915	0.23 mi (370 m)	75 yd (69 m)	$10,000	The roof was torn from a mobile home, and trees and power lines were damaged.	
EF1	WNW of Spurger	Tyler	TX	30.6829°N 94.2553°W	2000–2006	4.25 mi (6.84 km)	50 yd (46 m)	$15,000	Four homes sustained minor shingle loss, a few sheds, barns, carports, and garages had metal roofing peeled off, and numerous trees were snapped.	
EF1	SSE of Jasper	Jasper	TX	30.864°N 93.979°W	2035–2039	1.98 mi (3.19 km)	150 yd (140 m)	$100,000	Three outbuildings, a carport, and a portion of a home (mainly the garage) were destroyed, an awning was damaged, and a fourth outbuilding lost part of its roof. Also, four vehicles were either damaged or destroyed, and many trees were downed.	

=== December 29 event ===
List of confirmed tornadoes – Monday, December 29, 2014
EF#	Location	County / Parish	State	Start Coord.	Time (UTC)	Path length	Max width	Damage	Summary	Refs
EF2	Valdosta	Lowndes	GA	30.8157°N 83.2833°W	1626–1630	0.74 mi (1.19 km)	180 yd (160 m)	$750,000	A strong tornado impacted Langdale Forest Products on the south side of Valdosta, severely damaging or destroying several large metal buildings and tossing vehicles around 70 yards (64 m). It also flipped two rail cars, caused minor damage to a few other buildings, and downed trees and power lines. The tornado also caused nine injuries.	

== See also ==
- Tornadoes of 2014
- List of United States tornadoes from August to September 2014
- List of United States tornadoes from January to March 2015
