= Emmeram, Kansas =

Unincorporated community in Ellis County, Kansas

- Unincorporated community
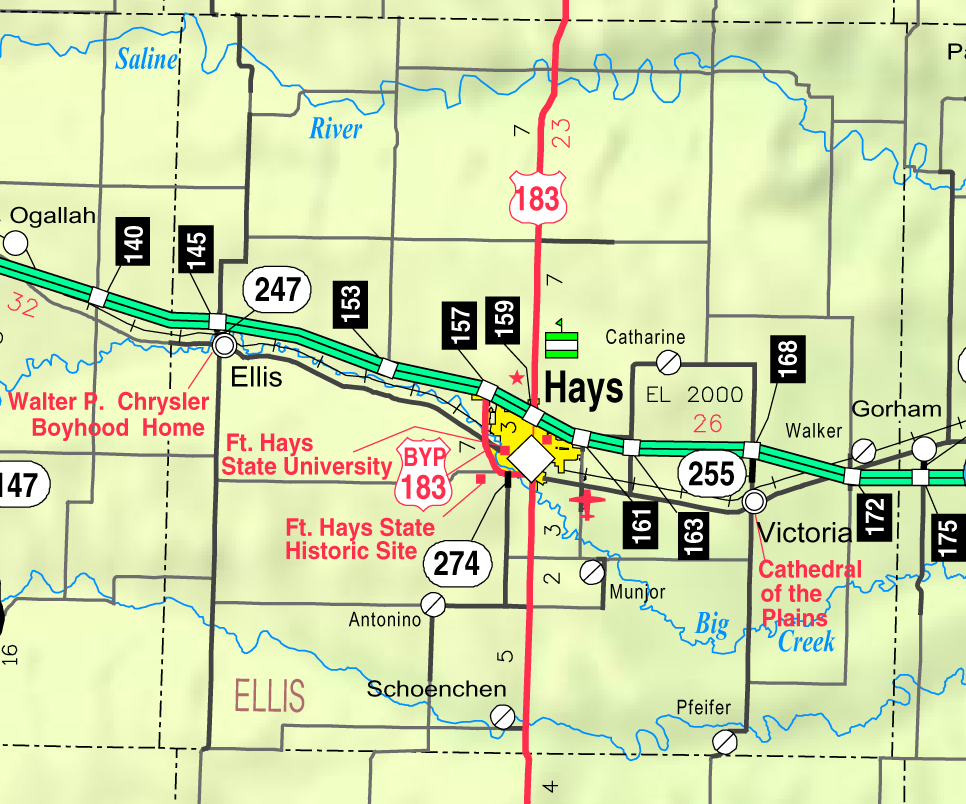
- KDOT map of Ellis County (legend)

- Location within Kansas Location within the United States
- Coordinates: 38°57′31″N 99°07′56″W
- Country: United States
- State: Kansas
- County: Ellis
- Platted: 1902
- Elevation: 2,001 ft (610 m)
- Time zone: UTC-6 (CST)
  - Summer (DST): UTC-5 (CDT)
- ZIP Code: 67640
- Area code: 785
- FIPS code: 20-21050
- GNIS ID: 484724

Emmeram is an unincorporated community in Herzog Township, Ellis County, Kansas, United States.

== History ==
In 1899, Catholic parishioners from nearby Herzog established a new parish six miles to the north and began construction of Sacred Heart Church, which they completed in 1901. Originally named Norddorf, the community was renamed Emmeram after Emmeram Kausler, the church pastor. The community grew to include two schools, and a town plot was filed in 1902, but the town was never built. A post office operated in Emmeram from 1903 to 1904.

== Geography ==
Emmeram is located approximately one-half mile northeast of Walker Creek, part of the Smoky Hill River watershed, in the Smoky Hills region of the Great Plains. Emmeram is roughly 5.5 miles (8.9 km) north of Interstate 70 and 11 miles (18 km) northeast of Hays, the county seat.

== Transportation ==
Emmeram lies at the intersection of two unpaved county roads, Emmeram Road, which runs east–west, and 350th Avenue, which runs north–south.
