= Akron, Illinois =

- Unincorporated community
- Location within Illinois Location within the United States
- Coordinates: 40°54′14″N 89°39′14″W
- Country: United States
- State: Illinois
- County: Peoria
- Elevation: 722 ft (220 m)
- Time zone: UTC-6 (Central (CST))
  - Summer (DST): UTC-5 (CDT)
- Area code: 309
- GNIS feature ID: 422393

Akron is an unincorporated community in Akron Township, Peoria County, in the U.S. state of Illinois.

== History ==
Akron was made a railroad station in 1901 when the Chicago and North Western Railway was extended to that point. A large share of the early settlers being natives of Akron, Ohio, caused the name to be selected.
