= Edge City (disambiguation) =

Edge City is a syndicated comic strip, begun in 2000.

Edge City also may refer to:

- Edge city, a city-planning concept
- Edge City: Life on the New Frontier, a 1991 book by Joel Garreau
- The fictional settings for works of The Mask franchise:
  - In the 1996 comics spinoff series Walter: Campaign of Terror
  - In the 1994 film The Mask
  - In the 1995–1997 television series The Mask: Animated Series
- A fictional metropolitan area on the Smallville television series (2001–2011)
- The production company for the 1984 film Repo Man
- Edge City (film), a 1998 film starring Charlie Hofheimer

== See also ==
- List of edge cities
- Edge of the City, a 1957 American film
- The City's Edge, a 1983 Australian film
