= KQWC =

KQWC may refer to:

- KQWC-FM, a radio station (95.7 FM) licensed to serve Webster City, Iowa, United States
- KZWC, a radio station (1570 AM) licensed to serve Webster City, Iowa, which held the call sign KQWC from 1971 to 2016
