= List of exurbs in the United States =

This list of exurbs in the United States from the Finding Exurbia report was identified by the Brookings Institution in 2006. Some of them form a Micropolitan Statistical Area or other small metro area that may connect with a larger one to form a Combined Statistical Area.

== Criteria ==
To qualify as an exurb in the Finding Exurbia report, a census tract must meet three criteria:

1. Economic connection to a large metropolis.
2. Low housing density: bottom third of census tracts with regard to housing density. In 2000, this was a minimum of 2.6 acres (11,000 m^{2}) per resident.
3. Population growth exceeding the average for its metropolitan area.

== List ==
These exurbs are listed in the report, sorted by Metropolitan Statistical Area and then by state. Occasional nuances in their economies and relevant population centers will be marked as well.

=== Albuquerque, New Mexico ===
- Torrance County, New Mexico
- Valencia County, New Mexico

=== Anchorage, Alaska ===
- Denali Borough, Alaska
- Kenai Peninsula Borough, Alaska

=== Atlanta, Georgia ===
- Barrow County, Georgia
- Bartow County, Georgia
- Butts County, Georgia
- Coweta County, Georgia
- Dawson County, Georgia
- Jackson County, Georgia (Jefferson micropolis)
- Jasper County, Georgia
- Lumpkin County, Georgia
- Newton County, Georgia
- Pickens County, Georgia
- Walton County, Georgia

=== Austin, Texas ===
- Bastrop County, Texas (Elgin)
- Blanco County, Texas
- Burnet County, Texas (Marble Falls)
- Caldwell County, Texas
- Hays County, Texas (San Marcos)

=== Baltimore, Maryland ===
==== Maryland ====
- Anne Arundel County, Maryland (home to state capital Annapolis)
- Carroll County, Maryland (Taneytown, Westminster)
- Queen Anne's County, Maryland

==== Pennsylvania ====
- York County, Pennsylvania (York)

=== Baton Rouge, Louisiana ===
- East Feliciana Parish, Louisiana
- Livingston Parish, Louisiana
- West Baton Rouge Parish, Louisiana
- West Feliciana Parish, Louisiana

=== Birmingham, Alabama ===
- Bibb County, Alabama
- Blount County, Alabama
- Shelby County, Alabama
- Saint Clair County, Alabama

=== Bismarck, North Dakota ===
- McHenry County, North Dakota (Towner, Velva)
- Ward County, North Dakota (Minot)
- Mountrail County, North Dakota (Stanley, New Town)
- Dunn County, North Dakota (Manning, Killdeer)
- Mercer County, North Dakota (Stanton, Beulah)
- Stark County, North Dakota (Dickinson)
- Grant County, North Dakota (Carson, Elgin)
- Sioux County, North Dakota (Fort Yates, Cannon Ball)
- Pierce County, North Dakota (Rugby)
- Wells County, North Dakota (Fessenden, Harvey)
- Stutsman County, North Dakota (Jamestown)
- Logan County, North Dakota (Napoleon)
- McIntosh County, North Dakota (Ashley, Wishek)

=== Boston, Massachusetts ===
==== Massachusetts ====
- Plymouth County, Massachusetts (Brockton, Plymouth)

==== New Hampshire ====
- Rockingham County, New Hampshire
- Strafford County, New Hampshire

=== Charleston, South Carolina ===
- Berkeley County, South Carolina

=== Charlotte, North Carolina ===
==== North Carolina ====
- Anson County, North Carolina
- Iredell County, North Carolina

==== South Carolina ====
- York County, South Carolina

=== Chicago, Illinois ===
==== Illinois ====
- Bureau County, Illinois (Princeton)
- DeKalb County, Illinois (home to college town DeKalb)
- Grundy County, Illinois (Morris)
- Kankakee County, Illinois (Kankakee)
- Kendall County, Illinois (Oswego)
- LaSalle County, Illinois (Ottawa, resort town Utica)
- Putnam County, Illinois (Hennepin, Granville)

==== Indiana ====
- Jasper County, Indiana (Rensselaer)
- LaPorte County, Indiana (LaPorte, Michigan City)
- Porter County, Indiana (home to college town Valparaiso)
- Newton County, Indiana (Kentland)

==== Wisconsin ====
- Kenosha County, Wisconsin (home of college town Kenosha)

=== Cincinnati, Ohio ===
==== Indiana ====
- Dearborn County, Indiana (Lawrenceburg)
- Franklin County, Indiana (Brookville,Batesville)

==== Kentucky ====
- Bracken County, Kentucky (Brooksville, Augusta)
- Gallatin County, Kentucky (Warsaw)
- Grant County, Kentucky (Williamstown)
- Pendleton County, Kentucky (Falmouth)

==== Ohio ====
- Brown County, Ohio (Georgetown)
- Clinton County, Ohio (home to college townWilmington)

=== Cleveland, Ohio ===
- Geauga County, Ohio (Chardon)
- Medina County, Ohio (Medina, Brunswick)

=== Colorado Springs, Colorado ===
- Teller County, Colorado

=== Columbia, South Carolina ===
- Calhoun County, South Carolina
- Fairfield County, South Carolina
- Kershaw County, South Carolina
- Lexington County, South Carolina
- Newberry County, South Carolina (Newberry)
- Saluda County, South Carolina

=== Columbus, Ohio ===
- Madison County, Ohio (London)
- Morrow County, Ohio (Mount Gilead)
- Perry County, Ohio (New Lexington)
- Pickaway County, Ohio (Circleville)
- Union County, Ohio (Marysville)

=== Dallas, Texas/ Fort Worth, Texas ===
==== Oklahoma ====
- Bryan County, Oklahoma (Durant)

==== Texas ====
- Ellis County, Texas (Waxahachie)
- Henderson County, Texas
- Hood County, Texas (Granbury)
- Kaufman County, Texas
- Hunt County, Texas
- Johnson County, Texas (Burleson)
- Parker County, Texas
- Rains County, Texas
- Van Zandt County, Texas
- Wise County, Texas

=== Davenport, Iowa/Moline, Illinois/East Moline, Illinois/Rock Island, Illinois ===
==== Iowa ====
- Jackson County, Iowa (Maquoketa)
- Jones County, Iowa (Anamosa)
- Linn County, Iowa (Cedar Rapids)
- Johnson County, Iowa (Iowa City)
- Louisa County, Iowa (Wapello)

==== Illinois ====
- Bureau County, Illinois (Princeton)
- Stark County, Illinois (Toulon, Wyoming)
- Knox County, Illinois (Galesburg)
- Warren County, Illinois (Monmouth)
- Henderson County, Illinois (Oquawka)

=== Denver, Colorado ===
- Clear Creek County, Colorado
- Elbert County, Colorado
- Gilpin County, Colorado
- Park County, Colorado

=== Des Moines, Iowa ===
- Hamilton County, Iowa (Webster City)
- Greene County, Iowa (Jefferson)
- Guthrie County, Iowa (Guthrie Center)
- Madison County, Iowa (Winterset)
- Marion County, Iowa (Knoxville, Pella)
- Poweshiek County, Iowa (Montezuma, Grinnell)
- Tama County, Iowa (Toledo, Tama)
- Marshall County, Iowa (home to college town Marshalltown)

=== Detroit, Michigan ===
- Lapeer County, Michigan (Lapeer)
- Livingston County, Michigan (Howell)
- Saint Clair County, Michigan (Port Huron)

=== Duluth, Minnesota/ Twin Ports ===
- Pine County, Minnesota (Pine City)

=== Eau Claire, Wisconsin ===
- Rusk County, Wisconsin (Ladysmith)
- Barron County, Wisconsin (Barron, Rice Lake)
- St. Croix County, Wisconsin (Hudson)
- Pierce County, Wisconsin (Ellsworth, college town River Falls)
- Taylor County, Wisconsin (Medford)
- Marathon County, Wisconsin (Wausau)
- Wood County, Wisconsin (Sparta)
- Juneau County, Wisconsin (Mauston)
- Monroe County, Wisconsin (Wisconsin Rapids, Marshfield)
- La Crosse County, Wisconsin (La Crosse)

=== Eugene, Oregon ===
- Linn County, Oregon
- Deschutes County, Oregon
- Klamath County, Oregon
- Douglas County, Oregon

=== Evansville, Indiana ===
- Spencer County, Indiana (Rockport, Santa Claus)
- Dubois County, Indiana (Jasper)
- Pike County, Indiana (Petersburg)
- Knox County, Indiana (Vincennes)

=== Fargo, North Dakota ===
- Grand Forks County, North Dakota (home to college town Grand Forks)
- Nelson County, North Dakota (Lakota)
- Griggs County, North Dakota (Cooperstown)
- Stutsman County, North Dakota (home to college town Jamestown)
- Kidder County, North Dakota (Steele)
- Logan County, North Dakota (Napoleon)
- LaMoure County, North Dakota (LaMoure)

=== Fort Wayne, Indiana ===
- Steuben County, Indiana (Angola)
- LaGrange County, Indiana (LaGrange)
- Kosciusko County, Indiana (Warsaw)
- Wabash County, Indiana (Wabash)
- Grant County, Indiana (Marion)
- Blackford County, Indiana (Hartford City)
- Jay County, Indiana (Portland)

=== Grand Rapids, Michigan ===
- Barry County, Michigan (Hastings)

=== Green Bay, Wisconsin ===
- Door County, Wisconsin (Sturgeon Bay)
- Marinette County, Wisconsin (Marinette)
- Forest County, Wisconsin (Crandon)
- Langlade County, Wisconsin (Antigo)
- Menominee County, Wisconsin (Keshena, Menominee)
- Marathon County, Wisconsin (Wausau)
- Waupaca County, Wisconsin (Waupaca, New London)
- Winnebago County, Wisconsin (Oshkosh)
- Fond Du Lac County, Wisconsin (Fon du Lac)
- Sheboygan County, Wisconsin (Sheboygan)

=== Honolulu, Hawaii ===
- Kauai County, Hawaii
- Maui County, Hawaii

=== Houston, Texas ===
- Chambers County, Texas
- Waller County, Texas (home to college town Prairie View)

=== Indianapolis, Indiana ===
- Clinton County, Indiana (Frankfort)
- Tipton County, Indiana (Tipton)
- Madison County, Indiana (home to college town Anderson)
- Henry County, Indiana (New Castle)
- Rush County, Indiana (Rushville)
- Bartholomew County, Indiana (Columbus)
- Brown County, Indiana (Nashville)
- Putnam County, Indiana (home to college town Greencastle)
- Montgomery County, Indiana (home to college town Crawfordsville)

=== Jackson, Mississippi ===
- Madison County, Mississippi

=== Kalamazoo, Michigan ===
- Jackson County, Michigan (Jackson)
- Hillsdale County, Michigan (Hillsdale)
- Branch County, Michigan (Coldwater)
- Eaton County, Michigan (Charlotte)
- Ionia County, Michigan (Ionia)
- Cass County, Michigan (Cassopolis, Dowagiac)

=== Kansas City, Missouri ===
==== Kansas ====
- Leavenworth County, Kansas (Leavenworth)
- Miami County, Kansas (Paola, Spring Hill)

==== Missouri ====
- Cass County, Missouri (Harrisonville)
- Johnson County, Missouri (Warrensburg)

=== Knoxville, Tennessee ===
- Blount County, Tennessee
- Campbell County (LaFollette micropolis)
- Cocke County (Newport micropolis)
- Grainger County, Tennessee
- Hamblen County, Tennessee (Morristown)
- Jefferson County, Tennessee (Morristown metropolis)
- Roane County, Tennessee (Harriman)
- Sevier County, Tennessee (Sevierville)
- Union County, Tennessee

=== Lansing, Michigan ===
- Clinton County, Michigan (St. Johns)
- Shiawassee County, Michigan (Corunna, Owosso)

=== Las Vegas, Nevada ===
- Nye County, Nevada (Pahrump)

=== Lincoln, Nebraska ===
- Nemaha County, Nebraska (Auburn)
- Johnson County, Nebraska (Tecumseh)
- Pawnee County, Nebraska (Pawnee City)
- Jefferson County, Nebraska (Fairbury)
- Fillmore County, Nebraska (Geneva)
- York County, Nebraska (York)
- Butler County, Nebraska (David City)

=== Little Rock, Arkansas ===
- Faulkner County, Arkansas
- Grant County, Arkansas
- Hot Spring County, Arkansas (Malvern)
- Lonoke County, Arkansas
- Perry County, Arkansas

=== Los Angeles, California ===
- Kern County, California (Bakersfield)
- Riverside County, California (Corona, Indio, Jurupa Valley, Menifee, Moreno Valley, Murrieta, Palm Desert, Palm Springs, Riverside, Temecula)
- San Bernardino County, California (Fontana, Ontario, Rancho Cucamonga, Rialto, San Bernardino, Victorville)
- Ventura County, California (Oxnard, San Buenaventura, Simi Valley, Thousand Oaks)

=== Madison, Wisconsin ===
- LaFayette County, Wisconsin (Darlington)
- Richland County, Wisconsin (Richland Center)
- Vernon County, Wisconsin (Viroqua)
- Juneau County, Wisconsin (Mauston)
- Adams County, Wisconsin (Friendship, Adams)
- Marquette County, Wisconsin (Montello)
- Green Lake County, Wisconsin (Green Lake, Berlin)
- Fond Du Lac County, Wisconsin (Fond Du Lac)

=== Memphis, Tennessee ===
==== Arkansas ====
- Saint Francis County, Arkansas (Forrest City)

==== Mississippi ====
- DeSoto County, Mississippi (Southaven)
- Marshall County, Mississippi
- Tate County, Mississippi

==== Tennessee ====
- Fayette County, Tennessee
- Tipton County, Tennessee (Oakland)

=== Milwaukee, Wisconsin ===
==== Wisconsin ====
- Kenosha County, Wisconsin (home of college town Kenosha)
- Walworth County, Wisconsin (home of college town Whitewater and resort town Lake Geneva)
- Jefferson County, Wisconsin (Jefferson, Watertown)
- Dodge County, Wisconsin (Juneau, Beaver Dam)
- Washington County, Wisconsin (West Bend)
- Sheboygan County, Wisconsin (Sheboygan)

=== Minneapolis, Minnesota/ Twin Cities ===
==== Minnesota ====
- Scott County, Minnesota (Shakopee)
- Sherburne County, Minnesota (Elk River)
- Wright County, Minnesota (Buffalo, Otsego)

==== Wisconsin ====
- Polk County, Wisconsin (Balsam Lake, Amery)
- Saint Croix County, Wisconsin (Hudson)

=== Nashville, Tennessee ===
- Cannon County, Tennessee
- Cheatham County, Tennessee
- Dickson County, Tennessee
- Hickman County, Tennessee
- Robertson County, Tennessee
- Rutherford County, Tennessee (Murfreesboro)
- Trousdale County, Tennessee (Hartsville)
- Wilson County, Tennessee (Mount Juliet, Lebanon)

=== New Orleans, Louisiana ===
- Plaquemines Parish, Louisiana
- Saint Tammany Parish, Louisiana (Covington, Mandeville, Slidell)

=== New York, New York ===
==== Connecticut ====
- Greater Bridgeport Planning Region, Connecticut (Bridgeport)
- Naugatuck Valley Planning Region, Connecticut (Waterbury)
- Northwest Hills Planning Region, Connecticut (Torrington)
- South Central Connecticut Planning Region, Connecticut (home to college town New Haven)
- Western Connecticut Planning Region, Connecticut (Stamford)

==== New Jersey ====
- Essex County, New Jersey (Newark)
- Hunterdon County, New Jersey
- Middlesex County, New Jersey (home to college town New Brunswick and to suburban Monroe Township
- Monmouth County, New Jersey (Asbury Park, Freehold, Long Branch, Red Bank, West Long Branch)
- Morris County, New Jersey (Morristown, Parsippany-Troy Hills)
- Ocean County, New Jersey (Lakewood)
- Passaic County, New Jersey (Passaic, Paterson, Clifton)
- Somerset County, New Jersey (Franklin Township)
- Sussex County, New Jersey
- Union County, New Jersey (Elizabeth)
- Warren County, New Jersey

==== New York ====
- Dutchess County, New York (Poughkeepsie)
- Orange County, New York (Middletown, Newburgh)
- Ulster County, New York (Kingston)
- Putnam County, New York (Brewster)
- Rockland County, New York (Ramapo)
- Suffolk County, New York (Amityville, Babylon, Brentwood, Fire Island, Hauppauge, Huntington, Islip, Montauk, Port Jefferson, Riverhead, Ronkonkoma, Stony Brook, The Hamptons)
- Sullivan County, New York (Monticello)

==== Pennsylvania ====
- Monroe County, Pennsylvania
- Pike County, Pennsylvania
- Wayne County, Pennsylvania

=== Oklahoma City, Oklahoma ===
- Grady County, Oklahoma
- Lincoln County, Oklahoma
- Logan County, Oklahoma
- McClain County, Oklahoma

=== Omaha, Nebraska/ Council Bluffs, Iowa ===
==== Iowa ====
- Harrison County, Iowa (Logan, Missouri Valley)
- Mills County, Iowa (Glenwood)

==== Nebraska ====
- Cass County, Nebraska (Plattsmouth)
- Dodge County, Nebraska (Fremont micropolis)
- Saunders County, Nebraska (Wahoo)
- Washington County, Nebraska (Blair)

=== Orlando, Florida ===
- Lake County, Florida
- Osceola County, Florida (Kissimmee)

=== Peoria, Illinois ===
- Bureau County, Illinois (Princeton)
- Henry County, Illinois (Cambridge, Kewanee)
- Mercer County, Illinois (Aledo)
- Warren County, Illinois (Monmouth)
- McDonough County, Illinois (Macomb)
- Schuyler County, Illinois (Rushville)
- Mason County, Illinois (Havana)
- McLean County, Illinois (Bloomington)
- Livingston County, Illinois (Pontiac)
- LaSalle County, Illinois (Ottawa)
- Putnam County, Illinois (Hennepin, Granville)

=== Phoenix, Arizona ===
- Pinal County, Arizona

=== Philadelphia, Pennsylvania/ Camden, New Jersey ===
==== Delaware ====
- Kent County, Delaware (home to state capital Dover)
- New Castle County, Delaware (Wilmington, New Castle, Newark)

==== Maryland ====
- Cecil County, Maryland (Wilmington metropolis)

==== New Jersey ====
- Atlantic County, New Jersey (Atlantic City, Hammonton)
- Cape May County, New Jersey (Cape May, Ocean City)
- Cumberland County, New Jersey (Vineland)
- Mercer County, New Jersey (home to state capital Trenton)
- Salem County, New Jersey (Wilmington metropolis)

==== Pennsylvania ====
- Berks County, Pennsylvania (Reading)

=== Portland, Oregon ===
==== Oregon ====
- Yamhill County, Oregon (McMinnville)

==== Washington ====
- Skamania County, Washington (home to resort townStevenson,Carson)

=== Providence, Rhode Island ===
==== Massachusetts ====
- Bristol County, Massachusetts (Fall River, New Bedford)

==== Rhode Island ====
- Newport County, Rhode Island (Aquidneck Island)
- Washington County, Rhode Island

=== Raleigh, North Carolina ===
- Franklin County, North Carolina
- Johnston County, North Carolina

=== Rapid City, South Dakota ===
- Butte County, South Dakota (Belle Fourche)
- Perkins County, South Dakota (Bison, Lemmon)
- Ziebach County, South Dakota (Dupree)
- Stanley County, South Dakota (Fort Pierre)
- Jones County, South Dakota (Murdo)
- Mellette County, South Dakota (White River)
- Bennett County, South Dakota (Martin)
- Fall River County, South Dakota (Hot Springs)

=== Richmond, Virginia ===
- Amelia County, Virginia
- Caroline County, Virginia
- Charles City County, Virginia
- Cumberland County, Virginia
- Goochland County, Virginia
- Hanover County, Virginia
- King William County, Virginia
- Louisa County, Virginia
- New Kent County, Virginia
- Powhatan County, Virginia
- Sussex County, Virginia

=== Rochester, New York ===
- Orleans County, New York

=== Rockford, Illinois ===
- Jo Daviess County, Illinois (Galena)
- Carroll County, Illinois (Mount Carroll, Savanna)
- Whiteside County, Illinois (Morrison, Sterling)
- Lee County, Illinois (Dixon)

=== Saint Louis, Missouri ===
==== Illinois ====
- Calhoun County, Illinois (Hardin)
- Macoupin County, Illinois (home to college town Carlinville)
- Monroe County, Illinois (Waterloo)

==== Missouri ====
- Franklin County, Missouri (Union, Washington)
- Jefferson County, Missouri (Hillsboro, Arnold)
- Lincoln County, Missouri (Troy)
- Montgomery County, Missouri (Montgomery City)
- Sainte Genevieve County, Missouri (Ste. Genevieve)
- Warren County, Missouri (Warrenton)
- Washington County, Missouri (Potosi)

=== Salem, Oregon ===
- Jefferson County, Oregon
- Linn County, Oregon
- Wasco County, Oregon
- Clackamas County, Oregon
- Yamhill County, Oregon

=== Salt Lake City, Utah ===
- Summit County, Utah (Park City, Heber City micropolis)
- Tooele County, Utah (Tooele)
- Wasatch County, Utah (Heber City)

=== San Antonio, Texas ===
- Atascosa County, Texas
- Bandera County, Texas
- Comal County, Texas (New Braunfels)
- Guadalupe County, Texas
- Kendall County, Texas
- Medina County, Texas
- Wilson County, Texas

=== San Diego, California ===
- Riverside County, California
- Imperial County, California
- Orange County, California
- Tecate, Baja California
- Tijuana, Baja California

=== Sacramento, California ===
- Butte County, California (home to college town Chico)
- Sutter County, California (Yuba City)
- Yolo County, California (home to college town Davis)

=== San Francisco, California/ Oakland, California ===
- Napa County, California (Napa)
- Santa Cruz County, California (home to college town Santa Cruz)
- Solano County, California (Fairfield, Vacaville, Vallejo)
- Sonoma County, California (Petaluma, Santa Rosa)

=== San Jose, California ===
- Merced County, California (Merced)
- San Benito County, California (Hollister)

=== Seattle, Washington ===
- Island County, Washington (Camano Island, Oak Harbor, Whidbey Island)
- Lewis County, Washington (Centralia)
- Mason County, Washington (Shelton)
- Kitsap County, Washington (Bremerton, Port Orchard, Silverdale)
- Skagit County, Washington (Mount Vernon, Anacortes)
- Thurston County, Washington (state capital Olympia, Lacey, Tumwater)

=== Sioux Falls, South Dakota ===
- Brookings County, South Dakota (home to college town Brookings)
- Kingsbury County, South Dakota (De Smet)
- Miner County, South Dakota (Howard)
- Hanson County, South Dakota (Alexandria)
- Hutchinson County, South Dakota (Olivet, Parkston)
- Bon Homme County, South Dakota (Tyndall, Springfield)

=== South Bend, Indiana/Niles, Michigan ===
- St. Joseph County, Michigan (Centreville, Sturgis)
- Fulton County, Indiana (Rochester)

=== Spokane, Washington ===
- Pend Oreille County, Washington
- Lincoln County, Washington
- Whitman County, Washington
- Bonner County, Idaho
- Kootenai County, Idaho
- Benewah County, Idaho

=== Springfield, Illinois ===
- Tazewell County, Illinois (Pekin)
- Mason County, Illinois (Havana)
- Schuyler County, Illinois (Rushville)
- Brown County, Illinois (Mount Sterling)
- Pike County, Illinois (Pittsfield)
- Scott County, Illinois (Winchester)
- Greene County, Illinois (Carrollton)
- Jersey County, Illinois (Jerseyville)
- Madison County, Illinois (college town Edwardsville, Granite City)
- Bond County, Illinois (Greenville)
- Fayette County, Illinois (Vandalia)
- Shelby County, Illinois (Shelbyville)
- Moultrie County, Illinois (Sullivan)
- Piatt County, Illinois (Monticello)
- DeWitt County, Illinois (Clinton)
- McLean County, Illinois (Bloomington)

=== Stockton, California ===
- Calaveras County, California
- Stanislaus County, California (Modesto)

=== Tampa, Florida ===
- Hernando County, Florida

=== Toledo, Ohio ===
- Sandusky County, Ohio (Fremont)
- Seneca County, Ohio (Tiffin)
- Hancock County, Ohio (Findlay)
- Putnam County, Ohio (Ottawa)
- Defiance County, Ohio (Defiance)
- Williams County, Ohio (Bryan)

=== Topeka, Kansas ===
- Nemaha County, Kansas (Seneca, Sabetha)
- Marshall County, Kansas (Marysville)
- Riley County, Kansas (Manhattan)
- Geary County, Kansas (Junction City)
- Morris County, Kansas (Council Grove)
- Lyon County, Kansas (Emporia)
- Coffey County, Kansas (Burlington)
- Franklin County, Kansas (Ottawa)
- Johnson County, Kansas (Olathe, Overland Park)
- Leavenworth County, Kansas (Leavenworth)
- Atchison County, Kansas (Atchison)
- Brown County, Kansas (Hiawatha)

=== Traverse City, Michigan ===
- Lake County, Michigan (Baldwin)
- Mason County, Michigan (Ludington)
- Osceola County, Michigan (Reed City)
- Clare County, Michigan (Harrison, Clare)
- Gladwin County, Michigan (Gladwin)
- Arenac County, Michigan (Standish)

=== Tulsa, Oklahoma ===
- Creek County, Oklahoma
- Okmulgee County, Oklahoma
- Osage County, Oklahoma
- Pawnee County, Oklahoma
- Rogers County, Oklahoma
- Wagoner County, Oklahoma

=== Virginia Beach, Virginia ===
==== North Carolina ====
- Currituck County, North Carolina
- Gates County, North Carolina

==== Virginia ====
- Accomack County, Virginia
- Gloucester County, Virginia
- Isle of Wight County, Virginia
- Middlesex County, Virginia
- Northampton County, Virginia
- Southampton County, Virginia
- Suffolk, Virginia
- Surry County, Virginia
- York County, Virginia

=== Washington, District of Columbia ===
==== Maryland ====
- Calvert County, Maryland
- Charles County, Maryland (Waldorf)
- Frederick County, Maryland (Frederick)
- Howard County, Maryland (Columbia)
- Saint Mary's County, Maryland
- Washington County, Maryland (Hagerstown)

==== Virginia ====
- Culpeper County, Virginia
- Fauquier County, Virginia
- Frederick County, Virginia (home to college town Winchester)
- King George County, Virginia
- Orange County, Virginia
- Fredericksburg, Virginia/ Spotsylvania County, Virginia
- Stafford County, Virginia
- Warren County, Virginia

==== West Virginia ====
- Berkeley County, West Virginia (Martinsburg)
- Jefferson County, West Virginia (Charles Town, Harpers Ferry)

=== Wichita, Kansas ===
- Butler County, Kansas (El Dorado, Andover)
- Kingman County, Kansas (Kingman)

== See also ==
- List of edge cities
