= Asher Howard =

American politician (1877–1945)

1916 portrait of Howard

Asher Howard (May 25, 1877 – July 7, 1945) was an American lawyer and politician.

Howard was born on a farm near Webster City, Hamilton County, Iowa. He went to law school and had studied business education. He lived in Chicago, Illinois for seven years and then moved to Kanabec County, Minnesota in 1902 where he served as the Kanabec County Attorney from 1908 to 1910. In 1910. he moved to Minneapolis, Minnesota with his wife and family and continued to practice law. Howard was also involved in the grain business. Howard served in the Minnesota House of Representatives from 1917 to 1922.
