= Boomburb =

Large, suburban-like city

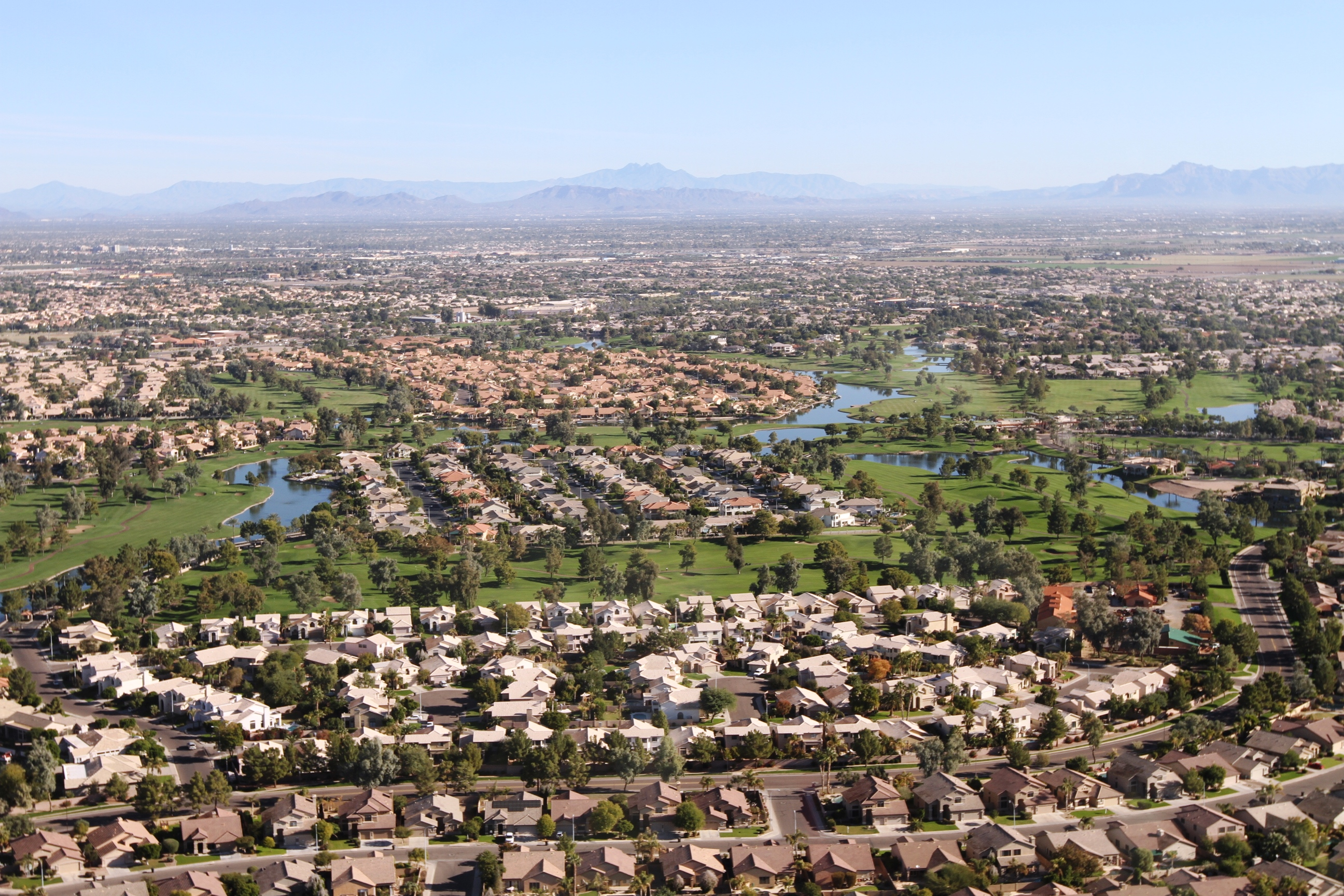
Aerial view of Chandler, Arizona, a city described as a boomburb

A boomburb is a large, rapidly growing city that remains essentially suburban in character, even as it reaches populations more typical of urban core cities. It describes a relatively recent phenomenon in a United States context. The neologism was principally promoted by American Robert E. Lang of the Metropolitan Institute at Virginia Tech in 2005.

== Definition ==
Boomburbs are defined as incorporated places in the top 50 Metropolitan areas in the United States of more than 100,000 residents, but that are not the core cities in their metropolitan areas and have maintained double-digit rates of population growth (10% or more) over consecutive censuses between 1970 and 2000.

As of the 2000 Census, the United States contained 54 boomburbs, which accounted for about half of the 1990s growth in cities with between 100,000 and 500,000 residents.

== List of boomburbs ==
The Robert E. Lang of Metropolitan Institute at Virginia Tech listed 54 boomburbs. Further examples not on Robert E. Lang's original list are marked with an asterisk below.

- Arizona
  - Chandler, Gilbert, Glendale, Mesa, Peoria, Scottsdale, Tempe
- California
  - Anaheim, Chula Vista, Corona, Costa Mesa, Daly City, Escondido, Fontana, Fremont, Fullerton, Irvine, Lancaster, Moreno Valley, Oceanside, Ontario, Orange, Oxnard, Palmdale, Rancho Cucamonga, Riverside, San Bernardino, Santa Ana, Santa Clarita, Santa Rosa, Simi Valley, Sunnyvale, Temecula*, Thousand Oaks
- Colorado
  - Aurora, Arvada*, Lakewood, Thornton*, Westminster
- Florida
  - Clearwater, Coral Springs, Davie*, Hialeah, Miramar*, Pembroke Pines, Pompano Beach*
- Kansas
  - Olathe*, Overland Park*
- Illinois
  - Aurora*, Elgin*, Joliet*, Naperville, Schaumburg*
- Michigan
  - Warren*, Sterling Heights*, Livonia*
- Nevada
  - Henderson, North Las Vegas
- Oregon
  - Hillsboro*, Gresham*
- Texas
  - Allen*, Arlington, Carrollton, Frisco*, Garland, Grand Prairie, Irving, McKinney*, Mesquite, Pasadena*, Pearland*, Plano, Richardson*, Round Rock*, Sugar Land*
- Utah
  - West Jordan*, West Valley City
- Washington
  - Bellevue, Everett*, Kent*, Renton*, Vancouver*
- Other States
  - Meridian, Idaho*; Cary, North Carolina*; Rio Rancho, New Mexico*; Chesapeake, Virginia

The boomburbs listed above are based on the populations of cities determined by and definitions of metropolitan areas used in the 2000 Census. Boomburbs have occurred mostly in the Southwest, with nearly half developing in areas of central and southern California.

== See also ==
- Edge city
- Urban sprawl
