= Faye Cashatt Lewis =

American doctor and author

Faye C. Lewis
- Born: Faye Cashatt; January 20, 1896
- Died: June 10, 1982 (aged 86)
- Education: University of South Dakota; Washington University in St. Louis

Faye Cashatt Lewis (20 January 1896 – 10 June 1982) was the first woman to graduate from Washington University School of Medicine in St. Louis. She is the author of multiple books including Doc's Wife, A Doctor Looks at Heart Trouble, and All Out Against Arthritis.

== Early life ==
Lewis was born on January 20, 1896 in Carroll County, Iowa and then moved with her family to South Dakota in 1909. Lewis received her undergraduate degree from University of South Dakota. In 1919, she transferred to Washington University School of Medicine in St. Louis as a third year student where she received her medical degree in 1921; she was the only woman in her class and the first to receive an M.D. from the university. She first practiced medicine in Michigan.

She married W.B. Lewis, who was a classmate at Washington University School of Medicine in 1923. She stopped practicing medicine and began writing, a life she described in her book Doc's Wife. They moved to Webster City, Iowa in 1928 and Faye re-started practicing medicine in 1943 during a period when her husband and others were serving in the military. While she did not intend to remain in practice, she ended up working as a doctor until she and her husband retired in 1969.

Lewis died on June 10, 1982.

== Selected publications ==
- Lewis, Faye Cashatt (1940-01-01). Doc's Wife. The Macmillan Company.
- Lewis, Faye Cashatt (1968-01-01). Patients, doctors, and families (First ed.). Doubleday.
- Lewis, Faye C. (1970). A Doctor Looks at Heart Trouble. M.D. Doubleday & Company, Inc., New York, N.Y.
- Lewis, Faye Cashatt (1971-01-01). Nothing To Make A Shadow (First ed.). Ames, Iowa: IA State Univ Press. ISBN 978-0-8138-0775-1.
- Lewis, Faye Cashatt (1973-01-01). All out against arthritis. Prentice-Hall. ISBN 978-0-13-022392-0.

== Awards and honors ==
At the 125th anniversary of Webster City, Iowa, Lewis was named the city's outstanding business woman.
