= KQWC-FM =

Radio station in Webster City–Fort Dodge, Iowa

- Webster City, Iowa; United States
- Broadcast area: Fort Dodge, Iowa
- Frequency: 95.7 MHz
- Branding: Q95

Programming
- Format: Classic rock
- Affiliations: ABC News Radio

Ownership
- Owner: Danette and Kirk Graeve; (Fieldview Broadcasting LLC)
- Sister stations: KZWC

History
- First air date: 1969
- Call sign meaning: "Q in Webster City"

Technical information
- Licensing authority: FCC
- Facility ID: 24661
- Class: C3
- ERP: 25,000 watts
- HAAT: 100 meters (330 ft)
- Transmitter coordinates: 42°28′04″N 93°47′48″W

Links
- Public license information: Public file; LMS
- Webcast: Listen Live
- Website: kqradio.com

KQWC-FM (95.7 MHz) is a radio station broadcasting a classic rock music format. Licensed to Webster City, Iowa, United States, the station serves the Fort Dodge area. The station is currently licensed to Fieldview Broadcasting LLC.

== History ==
The station first began broadcasting in 1969. In 1971, the Go-Rich Corporation, led by G.D. Warland, purchased the station from Jack Whitesell of Iowa Falls and changed the callsign to KQWC.

In 1991, the station underwent a significant technical upgrade, moving from its original frequency of 95.9 MHz to 95.7 MHz. This move coincided with the construction of a new 445-foot tower and an increase in power from 3,000 watts to 25,000 watts, expanding its coverage area across north-central Iowa. The station was acquired in 2019 by Danette and Kirk Graeve through Fieldview Broadcasting LLC.

== Programming ==
KQWC-FM is a long-time Iowa State Cyclones football and basketball affiliate, and carried the Chicago White Sox of the MLB from 2021 to 2023. The station also carries high school sports from the 5 high schools in the listening area, including Webster City, South Hamilton, Clarion-Goldfield-Dows, Eagle Grove, and Roland-Story.
