= KZWC =

Radio station in Webster City, Iowa

- Webster City, Iowa; United States
- Frequency: 1570 kHz
- Branding: 1570 - 92.9 The Breeze

Programming
- Format: Soft oldies
- Affiliations: ABC News Radio

Ownership
- Owner: Danette and Kirk Graeve; (Fieldview Broadcasting LLC)
- Sister stations: KQWC-FM

History
- First air date: February 9, 1950 (as KJFJ)
- Former call signs: KJFJ (1950–1971); KQWC (1971–2016)

Technical information
- Licensing authority: FCC
- Facility ID: 24660
- Class: D
- Power: 232 watts day 137 watts night
- Transmitter coordinates: 42°28′04″N 93°47′48″W
- Translator: 92.9 K225BZ (Webster City)

Links
- Public license information: Public file; LMS
- Webcast: Listen Live
- Website: kqradio.com

KZWC (1570 AM) is a commercial radio station serving the Webster City, Iowa, area. The station broadcasts a soft oldies format. KZWC is licensed to Fieldview Broadcasting LLC.

The station's frequency, 1570 AM, is a Mexican clear-channel frequency on which XERF-AM is the dominant Class A station.

KZWC also provides regular news, weather and sports coverage. A daily one-hour agricultural information called AgriTalk is locally produced and aired at 10 a.m. Monday through Friday.

Logo as "The Kruise"

The station first began broadcasting on February 9, 1950, originally using the callsign KJFJ. It was founded by the Daily Freeman-Journal, the local newspaper in Webster City, Iowa. In 1971, the Go-Rich Corporation purchased the station and changed its callsign to KQWC to match its FM sister station.

The station's call letters were changed to KZWC in 2016 following a move by then-owners Riverfront Broadcasting to differentiate the AM and FM programming. In 2019, the station was acquired by Danette and Kirk Graeve of Fieldview Broadcasting LLC, who continue to operate it today.

The transmitter and broadcast tower are located on the east outskirts of Webster City on East 2nd Street. According to the Antenna Structure Registration database, the tower is 132.9 m (436 ft) tall.
