= Webster City, Iowa =

City in Hamilton County, Iowa, U.S.

Webster City
- City
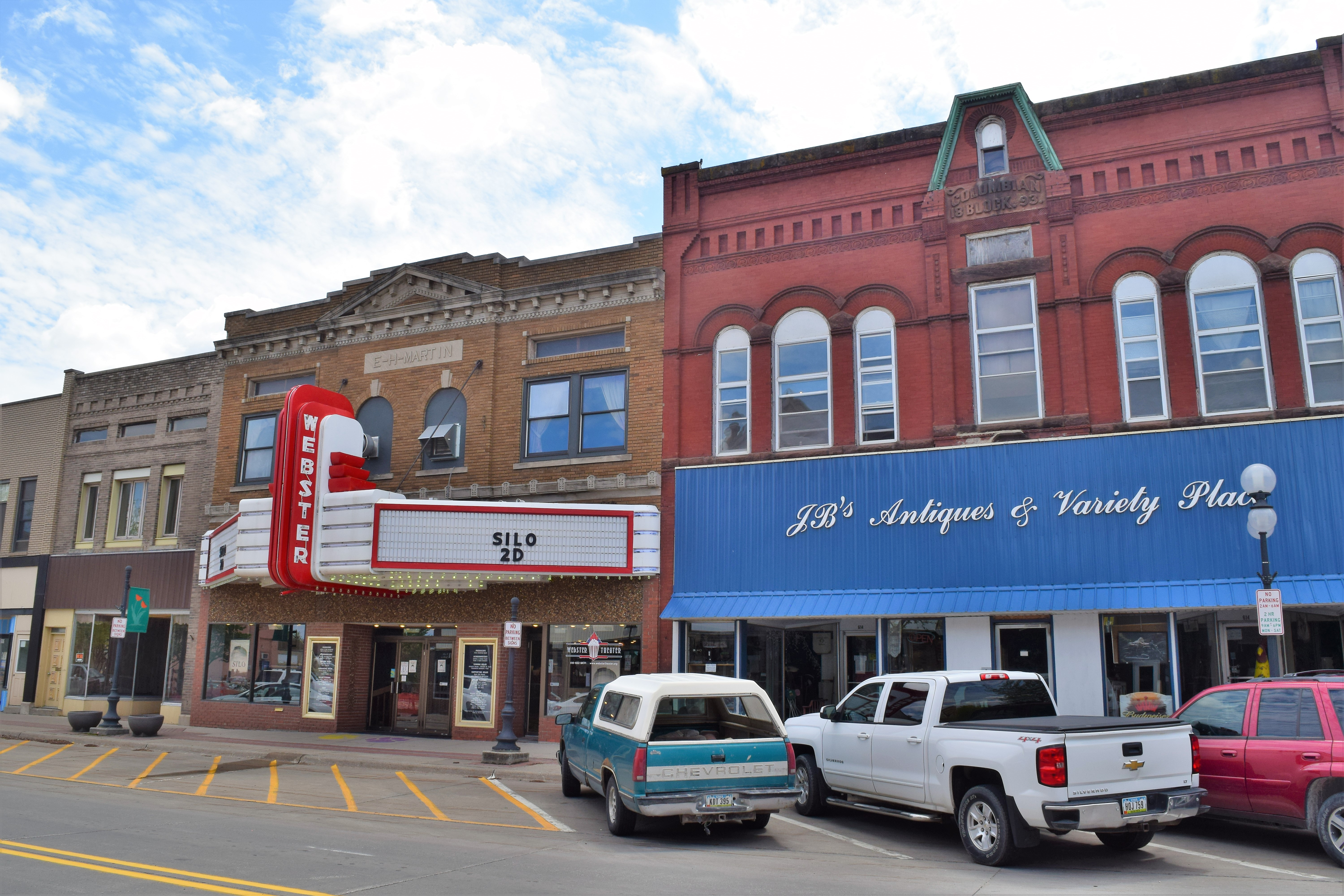
- Downtown Webster City

- Location of Webster City, Iowa
- Coordinates: 42°27′44″N 93°49′00″W
- Country: USA
- State: Iowa
- County: Hamilton

Area
  - Total: 8.91 sq mi (23.07 km^{2})
  - Land: 8.89 sq mi (23.03 km^{2})
  - Water: 0.015 sq mi (0.04 km^{2})
- Elevation: 1,037 ft (316 m)

Population (2020)
  - Total: 7,825
  - Density: 879.9/sq mi (339.73/km^{2})
- Time zone: UTC-6 (Central (CST))
  - Summer (DST): UTC-5 (CDT)
- ZIP code: 50595
- Area code: 515
- FIPS code: 19-83145
- GNIS feature ID: 468965
- Website: www.webstercity.com

Webster City is a city in Hamilton County, Iowa, United States. The population was 7,825 at the 2020 census. It is the county seat of Hamilton County. Webster City is known as 'Boone River Country', as the Boone River meanders along the east side of the city.

== History ==
Webster City was originally called Newcastle by settlers of European descent. Under the latter name it was changed in 1854 by Wilson Brewer. In 1855, Walter C. Willson came to Newcastle.

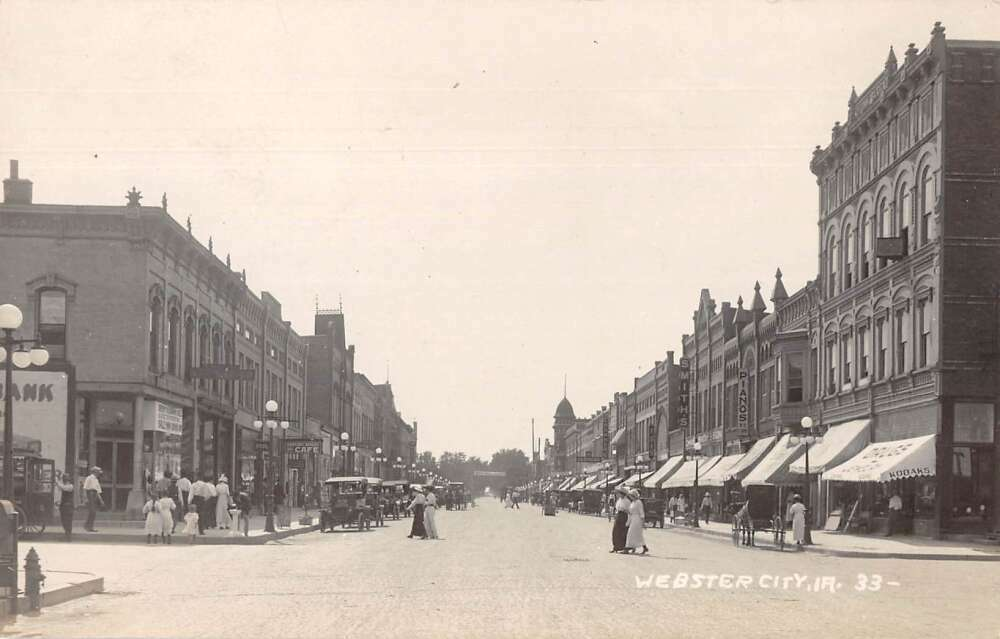
A main street in Webster City, Iowa was captured in a real photo postcard

Willson was elected to the Iowa State House the next year and, with John F. Duncombe, crafted a bill to divide the very large Webster County in half. Newcastle would be renamed "Webster City," named after Daniel Webster of Massachusetts and would become the county seat of the new county. Willson suggested "Hamilton County" after William W. Hamilton, the president of the State Senate. He helped pass the legislation. The law took effect on January 1, 1857, renaming Webster City and designating it as the county seat of the newly organized Hamilton County. Willson was also instrumental in getting the Dubuque & Sioux City rail line to be constructed through Webster City on its way to Fort Dodge. He personally oversaw the laying of track.

== Geography ==
According to the United States Census Bureau, the city has a total area of 8.88 square miles (23.00 km^{2}), of which 8.86 square miles (22.95 km^{2}) is land and 0.02 square miles (0.05 km^{2}) is water.

=== Climate ===
According to the Köppen Climate Classification system, Webster City has a hot-summer humid continental climate, abbreviated "Dfa" on climate maps.

Climate data for Webster City, Iowa, 1991–2020 normals, extremes 1893–present
Month	Jan	Feb	Mar	Apr	May	Jun	Jul	Aug	Sep	Oct	Nov	Dec	Year
Record high °F (°C)	72 (22)	72 (22)	89 (32)	97 (36)	107 (42)	107 (42)	109 (43)	109 (43)	103 (39)	96 (36)	81 (27)	69 (21)	109 (43)
Mean maximum °F (°C)	48.9 (9.4)	53.2 (11.8)	71.2 (21.8)	82.5 (28.1)	88.2 (31.2)	92.1 (33.4)	93.0 (33.9)	91.2 (32.9)	89.5 (31.9)	83.3 (28.5)	68.6 (20.3)	53.5 (11.9)	94.6 (34.8)
Mean daily maximum °F (°C)	26.2 (−3.2)	30.8 (−0.7)	44.1 (6.7)	58.9 (14.9)	70.0 (21.1)	79.5 (26.4)	82.8 (28.2)	80.5 (26.9)	74.8 (23.8)	61.9 (16.6)	45.4 (7.4)	31.7 (−0.2)	57.2 (14.0)
Daily mean °F (°C)	16.6 (−8.6)	20.9 (−6.2)	33.7 (0.9)	46.4 (8.0)	58.3 (14.6)	68.3 (20.2)	71.8 (22.1)	69.2 (20.7)	61.8 (16.6)	49.2 (9.6)	34.8 (1.6)	22.5 (−5.3)	46.1 (7.9)
Mean daily minimum °F (°C)	6.9 (−13.9)	10.9 (−11.7)	23.3 (−4.8)	33.9 (1.1)	46.7 (8.2)	57.2 (14.0)	60.8 (16.0)	58.0 (14.4)	48.9 (9.4)	36.5 (2.5)	24.1 (−4.4)	13.3 (−10.4)	35.0 (1.7)
Mean minimum °F (°C)	−15.2 (−26.2)	−10.5 (−23.6)	1.9 (−16.7)	19.8 (−6.8)	32.0 (0.0)	44.8 (7.1)	50.1 (10.1)	48.1 (8.9)	33.7 (0.9)	20.6 (−6.3)	7.5 (−13.6)	−7.5 (−21.9)	−19.0 (−28.3)
Record low °F (°C)	−33 (−36)	−34 (−37)	−29 (−34)	4 (−16)	17 (−8)	33 (1)	39 (4)	34 (1)	20 (−7)	−8 (−22)	−16 (−27)	−28 (−33)	−34 (−37)
Average precipitation inches (mm)	0.87 (22)	1.34 (34)	2.05 (52)	3.72 (94)	5.27 (134)	5.76 (146)	4.41 (112)	4.75 (121)	3.36 (85)	2.65 (67)	1.70 (43)	1.36 (35)	37.24 (945)
Average snowfall inches (cm)	7.9 (20)	9.8 (25)	4.4 (11)	1.0 (2.5)	0.2 (0.51)	0.0 (0.0)	0.0 (0.0)	0.0 (0.0)	0.0 (0.0)	0.1 (0.25)	1.4 (3.6)	8.1 (21)	32.9 (83.86)
Average precipitation days (≥ 0.01 in)	5.9	6.3	7.4	9.9	12.8	11.6	8.5	9.0	7.7	7.9	5.6	6.1	98.7
Average snowy days (≥ 0.1 in)	4.5	4.7	2.3	0.9	0.0	0.0	0.0	0.0	0.0	0.1	1.5	4.1	18.1
Source 1: NOAA
Source 2: National Weather Service

== Demographics ==
Historical populations
Year	Pop.	±%
1870	1,339	—
1880	1,848	+38.0%
1890	2,829	+53.1%
1900	4,613	+63.1%
1910	5,208	+12.9%
1920	5,657	+8.6%
1930	7,024	+24.2%
1940	6,738	−4.1%
1950	7,611	+13.0%
1960	8,520	+11.9%
1970	8,488	−0.4%
1980	8,572	+1.0%
1990	7,894	−7.9%
2000	8,176	+3.6%
2010	8,070	−1.3%
2020	7,825	−3.0%
Source:"U.S. Census website". United States Census Bureau. and Iowa Data Center; Source: U.S. Decennial Census

=== 2020 census ===
As of the 2020 census, there were 7,825 people, 3,320 households, and 1,992 families residing in the city. The population density was 879.9 inhabitants per square mile (339.7/km^{2}). There were 3,734 housing units at an average density of 419.9 per square mile (162.1/km^{2}). 97.2% of residents lived in urban areas, while 2.8% lived in rural areas.

Of the 3,320 households, 28.0% had children under the age of 18 living with them. Of all households, 43.6% were married-couple households, 7.2% were cohabitating couple households, 21.8% had a male householder with no spouse or partner present, and 27.3% had a female householder with no spouse or partner present. 40.0% of households were non-families. About 34.1% of all households were made up of individuals, and 15.9% had someone living alone who was 65 years of age or older.

The median age in the city was 40.7 years. 23.5% of residents were under the age of 18, and 20.9% were 65 years of age or older. By broader age groups, 25.6% of residents were under the age of 20; 5.3% were between the ages of 20 and 24; 23.7% were from 25 to 44; and 24.5% were from 45 to 64. The gender makeup of the city was 50.3% male and 49.7% female. For every 100 females, there were 101.3 males, and for every 100 females age 18 and over, there were 98.5 males.

There were 3,734 housing units, of which 11.1% were vacant. The homeowner vacancy rate was 3.5% and the rental vacancy rate was 12.9%.

Racial composition as of the 2020 census
Race	Number	Percent
White	6,320	80.8%
Black or African American	75	1.0%
American Indian and Alaska Native	56	0.7%
Asian	302	3.9%
Native Hawaiian and Other Pacific Islander	0	0.0%
Some other race	582	7.4%
Two or more races	490	6.3%
Hispanic or Latino (of any race)	1,190	15.2%

=== 2010 census ===
As of the census of 2010, there were 8,070 people, 3,433 households, and 2,096 families residing in the city. The population density was 910.8 inhabitants per square mile (351.7/km^{2}). There were 3,800 housing units at an average density of 428.9 per square mile (165.6/km^{2}). The racial makeup of the city was 90.8% White, 0.4% African American, 0.2% Native American, 3.4% Asian, 3.5% from other races, and 1.7% from two or more races. Hispanic or Latino of any race were 7.4% of the population.

There were 3,433 households, out of which 29.2% had children under the age of 18 living with them, 46.2% were married couples living together, 10.3% had a female householder with no husband present, 4.5% had a male householder with no wife present, and 38.9% were non-families. 33.5% of all households were made up of individuals, and 15.4% had someone living alone who was 65 years of age or older. The average household size was 2.31 and the average family size was 2.93.

The median age in the city was 40.2 years. 24.5% of residents were under the age of 18; 7.6% were between the ages of 18 and 24; 23.5% were from 25 to 44; 25.1% were from 45 to 64; and 19.3% were 65 years of age or older. The gender makeup of the city was 48.5% male and 51.5% female.

=== 2000 census ===
As of the census of 2000, there were 8,176 people, 3,502 households, and 2,227 families residing in the city. The population density was 955.5 inhabitants per square mile (368.9/km^{2}). There were 3,679 housing units at an average density of 430.0 per square mile (166.0/km^{2}). The racial makeup of the city was 95.41% White, 0.33% African American, 0.26% Native American, 2.45% Asian, 0.01% Pacific Islander, 0.48% from other races, and 1.06% from two or more races. Hispanic or Latino of any race were 1.32% of the population.

There were 3,502 households, out of which 28.4% had children under the age of 18 living with them, 50.5% were married couples living together, 9.5% had a female householder with no husband present, and 36.4% were non-families. 32.0% of all households were made up of individuals, and 15.3% had someone living alone who was 65 years of age or older. The average household size was 2.30 and the average family size was 2.89.

Age spread: 24.1% under the age of 18, 8.1% from 18 to 24, 26.7% from 25 to 44, 21.4% from 45 to 64, and 19.7% who were 65 years of age or older. The median age was 39 years. For every 100 females, there were 92.4 males. For every 100 females age 18 and over, there were 90.8 males.

The median income for a household in the city was $36,582, and the median income for a family was $44,342. Males had a median income of $30,404 versus $23,163 for females. The per capita income for the city was $19,057. About 5.2% of families and 7.3% of the population were below the poverty line, including 10.6% of those under age 18 and 5.6% of those age 65 or over.

== Business and industry ==
Webster City is the headquarters of several companies, including Vantec,Van Diest Supply Company, Mary Ann's Specialty Foods, Webster City Custom Meats, and Tasler. Webster City's top industries are advanced manufacturing, plastics manufacturing, food processing, agricultural related products, and warehousing and distribution.

Since 2010, Webster City has attracted new projects and business expansions, including the Van Diest Medical Center, a $35 million critical access hospital; and a $13 million competition gym at the high school

== Education ==
Public education in Webster City is provided by Webster City Community School District, with Webster City High School, Webster City Middle School, and Pleasant View or Sunset Heights for elementary education. A private Catholic school at St. Thomas Aquinas Catholic Church offers a preschool through 6th grade elementary education.

== Transportation ==
U.S. Route 20, a four-lane east-west corridor through north central Iowa, was built along Webster City. Approximately 12 miles east is Interstate 35. The city has a municipal airport with a 4,007 feet (1,221 m) runway and full-time Fixed-base operator. A junction of lines of the Canadian National and Union Pacific Railroads is located in Webster City. There is no Uber in the community.

== Recreation ==
Webster City has eleven parks, two golf courses, indoor and outdoor community swimming pools, a recreation center, more than seven miles of walking trails, and many camping areas:

- Kendall Young Park, along the Boone River, has 4 shelter houses, 6 picnic areas, a baseball diamond, 2 shuffle board courts, a volleyball court, horseshoe pit, playground, walking trail and fishing area.
- Twin Parks, located in downtown Webster City, features a new shelter house, picnic tables, modern playground, sun shelter, and a skatepark.
- Nokomis Park features a canoe access point.
- Middleton Sports Complex has 2 softball fields and an ice rink.
- Lions Park includes a play area, picnic area and basketball court.
- Riverside Park is located off East Second Street.
- Brewer Creek Park is open year-round and includes a shelter house with picnic tables along Brewer Creek. Brewer Creek is home to a 2.2-mile nature/walking trail, volleyball court and nine-hole disc golf course. In the winter "Hospital Hill" is a popular public sledding location.
- Sketchly Park features a picnic area and playground.
- E.V. Wehrhelm Park is a neighborhood park with play equipment and a shelter.
- Boone River Recreational Trail is a 5.7-mile trail from the Webster City Links Golf Course in the north part of the city limits to Briggs Woods Park in the south of the city limits. The trail winds along the Boone River and features a 10-foot-wide concrete pathway for biking, walking, running, and rollerblading.
- Briggs Woods Park is a 550-acre park with an 18-hole golf course, 81 campsites, 3 shelters, 4 cabins and a 62-acre lake for fishing, boating and swimming.
- Webster City Municipal Swimming Pool is an outdoor swimming pool with a zero-depth entry, 25-meter lap lanes, a diving well with high and low diving boards, and a waterslide.
- Fuller Hall Recreation Center is partially endowed and managed by the Fuller Hall Trust. It features activities for adults, children, and families, including a swimming pool with 25-meter lap lanes, a fitness room, a game room with pool tables, television lounge, basketball court, locker rooms, two racquetball courts, and a remodeled conference facility.
- Briggs Woods Golf Course is a public 18-hole golf course located south of town.
- The Webster City Links Golf Course is a nine-hole public course situated along the Boone River. It was formerly the private Webster City Country Club.

== Events and activities ==
Webster City is home to the Hamilton County Fairgrounds, which holds the county fair every July. In addition, the fairgrounds is home to the Historic Hamilton County Speedway.

Webster City's annual community celebration is the Boone Bash River Dash, which features a cardboard regatta. It is held every June.

== Media ==
The local radio stations are KZWC and KQWC-FM. The Daily Freeman Journal is the city's local newspaper and is published Monday through Friday.

== Notable people ==
- Jeremy Ferguson (Jinxx), Black Veil Brides' rhythm guitarist and violinist
- John Gregory, football coach and player
- Asher Howard, lawyer and Minnesota state legislator
- MacKinlay Kantor, writer and 1956 Pulitzer Prize winner for fiction for his novel Andersonville
- Chuck Lamson, professional football player
- Alan Larson (born 1949), diplomat and ambassador
- Faye Cashatt Lewis, doctor and writer
- Clark R. Mollenhoff, journalist and 1958 Pulitzer Prize winner for journalism in the category of National Reporting.
- Carla Nelson, Minnesota state Senator, candidate for United States House of Representatives in 2018
- Rod Rust, football coach
- Jennifer Simpson, distance runner, medalist at Olympics and World Championships
- Abastenia St. Leger Eberle, sculptor
