= Edge city =

New unstructured settlement created near a major city

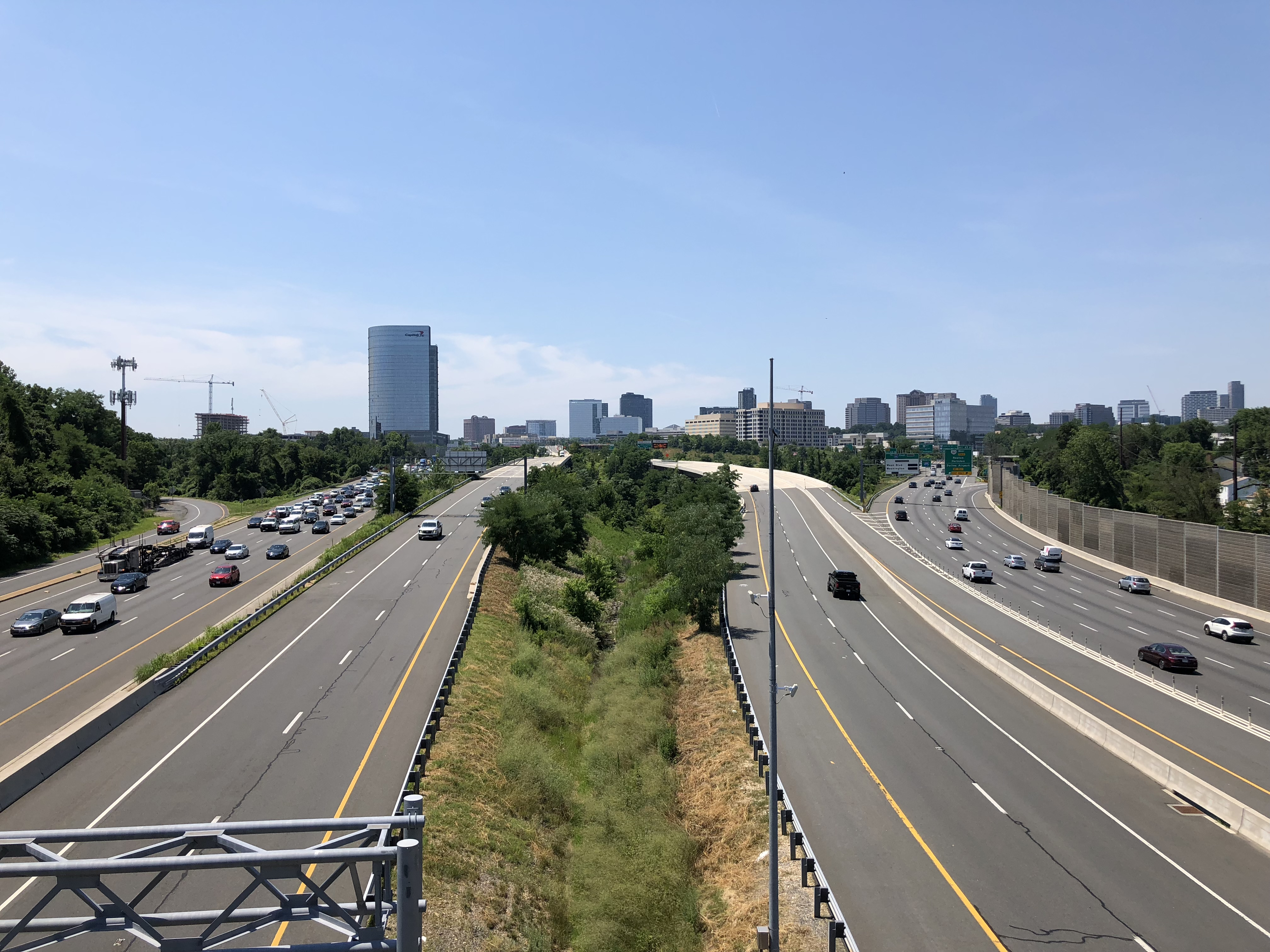
Tysons, Virginia, located outside Washington, D.C., is the classic example of an 'edge city' described by Joel Garreau in Edge City: Life on the New Frontier.

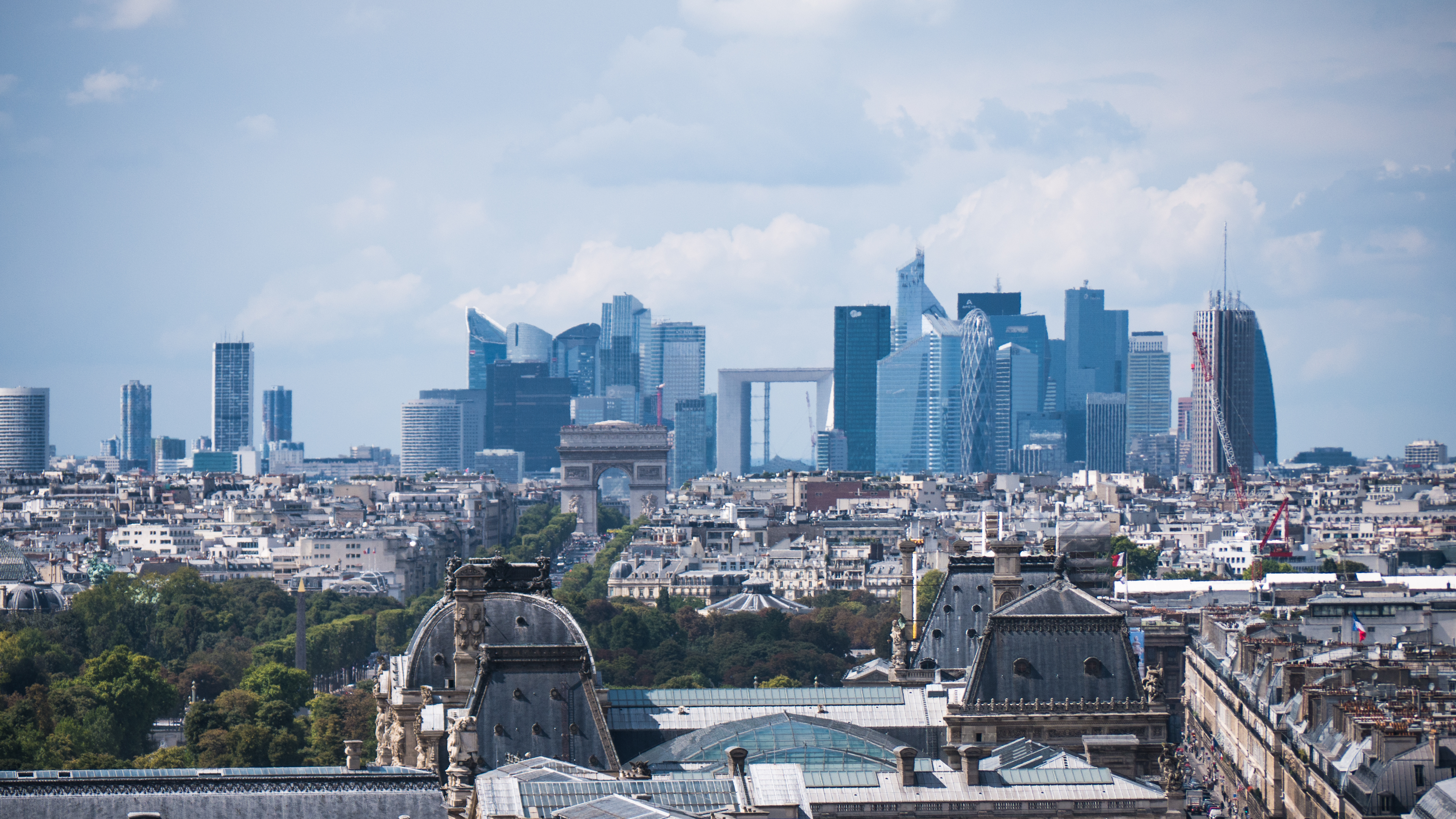
La Défense, an edge city of Paris

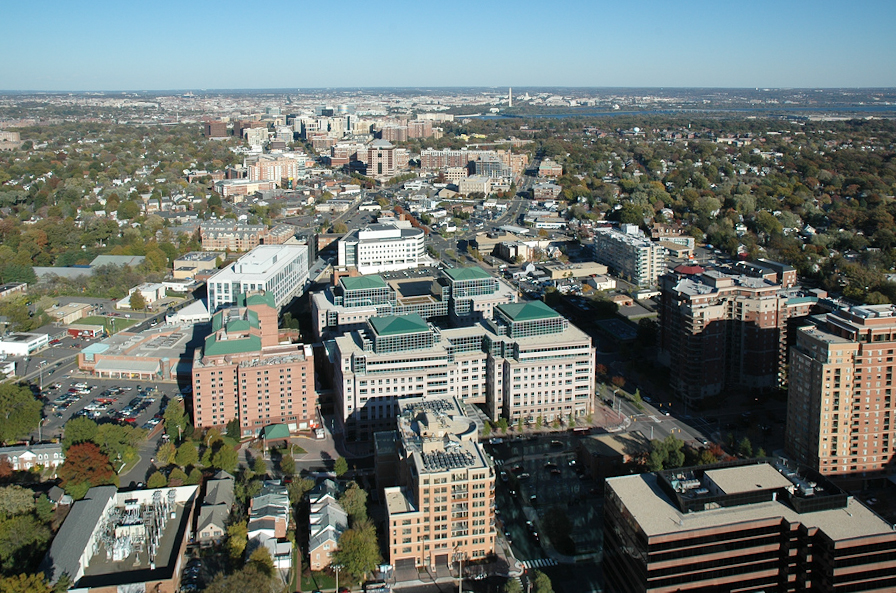
The Rosslyn–Ballston corridor in Arlington County near Washington, D.C.

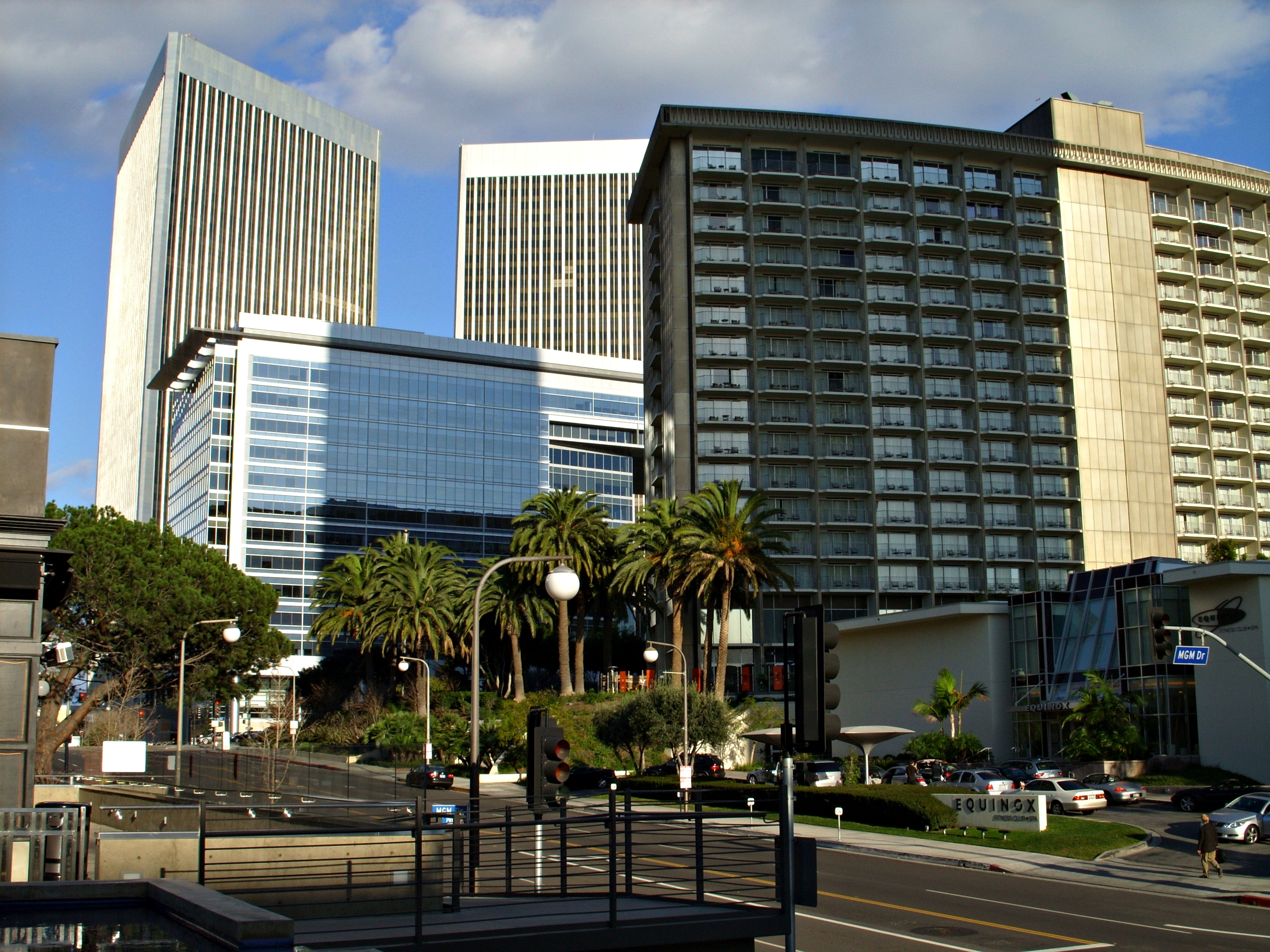
Century City, an edge city of Los Angeles

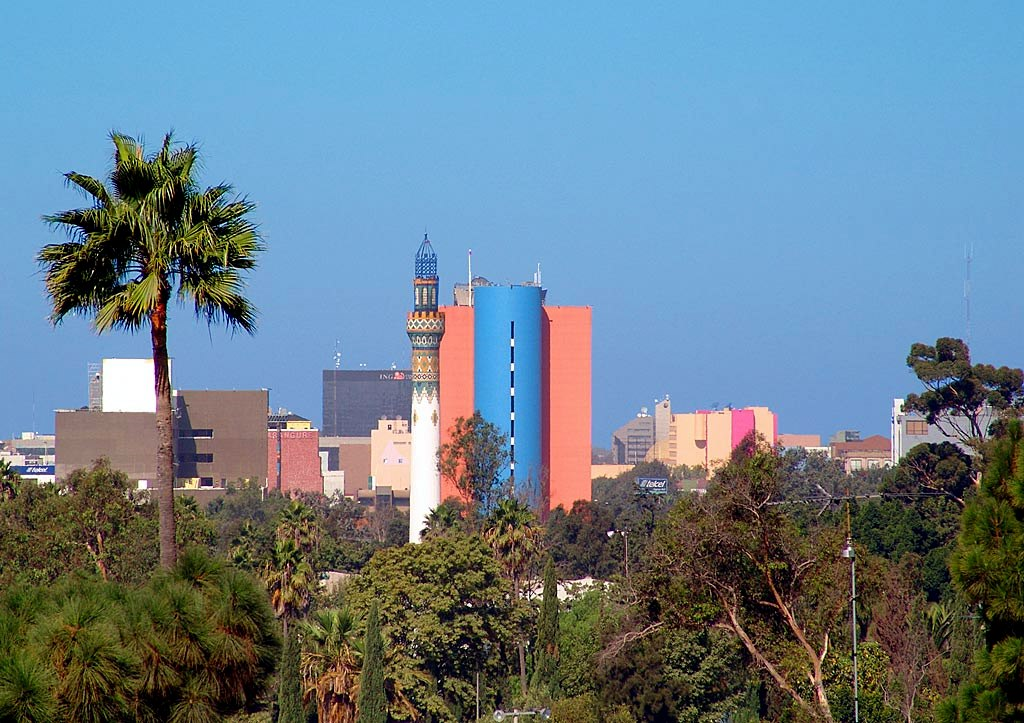
Zona Río, 1980s master-planned edge city and largest commercial district in Tijuana, Mexico

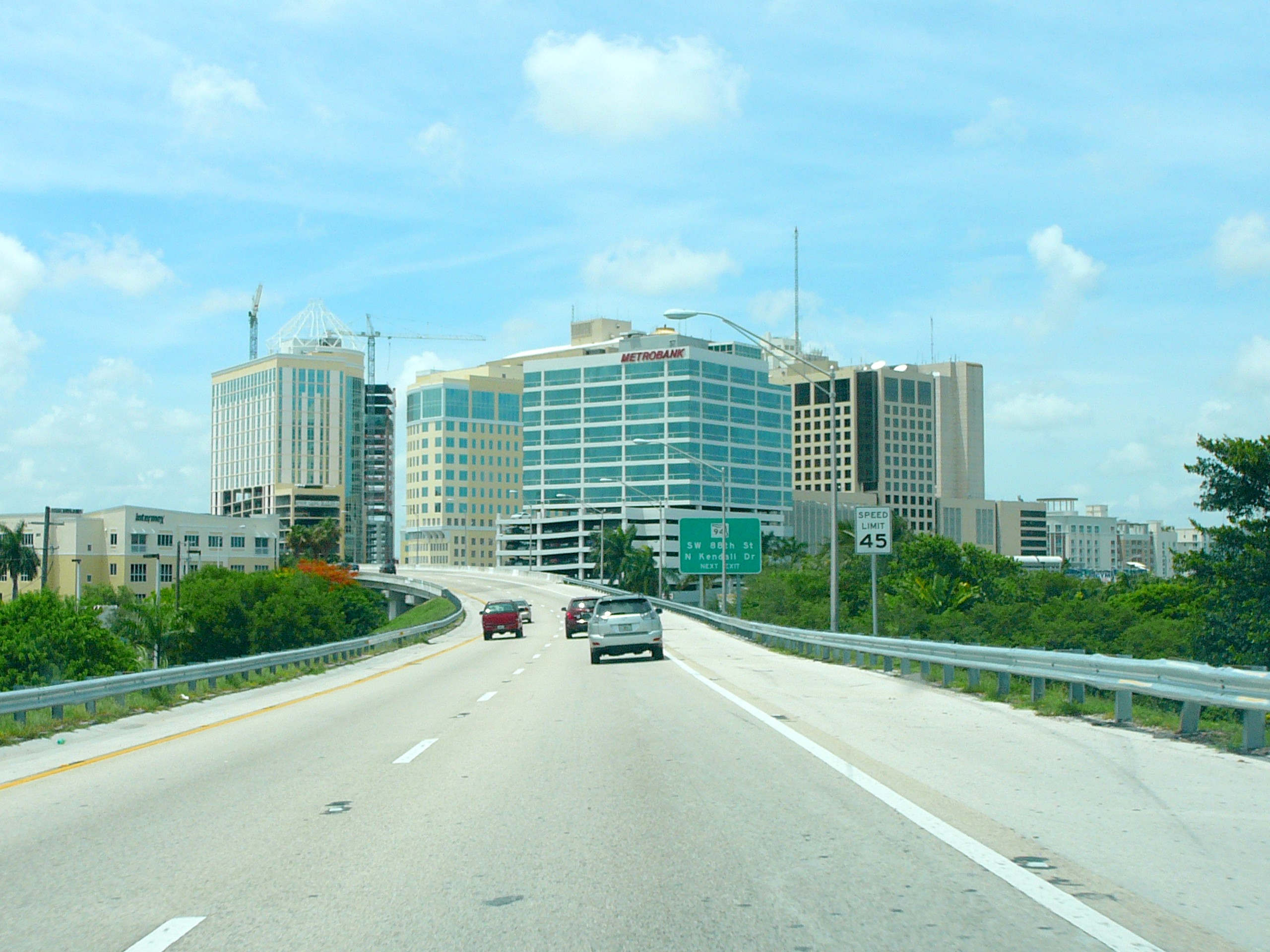
Dadeland is sometimes referred to as "downtown Kendall", despite the fact that Kendall is part of unincorporated Miami-Dade County. A special zoning area allowed high rise development in the area consisting mostly of single family homes.

An edge city is a concentration of business, shopping, and entertainment outside a traditional downtown or central business district, in what had previously been a suburban, residential or rural area. The term was popularized by the 1991 book Edge City: Life on the New Frontier by Joel Garreau, who established its current meaning while working as a reporter for The Washington Post. Garreau argues that the edge city has become the standard form of urban growth worldwide, representing a 20th-century urban form unlike that of the 19th-century central downtown. Other terms for these areas include suburban activity centers, megacenters, and suburban business districts. These districts have now developed in many countries.

== Definitions ==
In 1991, Garreau established five rules for a place to be considered an edge city:

- Has five million or more square feet (465,000 m^{2}) of leasable office space
- Has 600,000 or more square feet (56,000 m^{2}) of leasable retail space
- Has more jobs than bedrooms
- Is perceived by the population as one place
- Was nothing like a "city" as recently as 30 years ago, when it was just bedrooms, if not cow pastures.

Most edge cities develop at or near existing or planned freeway intersections, and are especially likely to develop near major airports. They rarely include heavy industry. They often are not separate legal entities but are governed as part of surrounding counties (this is more often the case in the East than in the Midwest, South, or West). They are numerous—almost 200 in the United States, compared to 45 downtowns of comparable size—and are large geographically because they are built at automobile scale.

=== Types of edge cities ===
Garreau identified three distinct varieties of the edge city phenomenon:

- Boomburbs or "boomers" – the most common type, having developed incrementally but rapidly around a shopping mall or highway interchange, for example Tysons, Virginia, near Washington, D.C.
- Greenfields – originally master-planned as new towns, generally on the suburban fringe, for example Reston Town Center in Reston, Virginia, near Washington, D.C.
- Uptowns – an older city, town, or satellite city, upon and around which a major regional hub of economic activity rises, for example Arlington, Virginia, across the Potomac River from Washington, D.C.

Additional terms are used to refer to edge cities, such as suburban business districts, major diversified centers, suburban cores, minicities, suburban activity centers, cities of realms, galactic cities, urban subcenters, pepperoni-pizza cities, superburbia, technoburbs, nucleations, disurbs, service cities, perimeter cities, peripheral centers, urban villages, and suburban downtowns.

== Density and cityscapes ==
Spatially, edge cities primarily consist of mid-rise office towers (with some skyscrapers) surrounded by massive surface parking lots and meticulously manicured lawns, almost reminiscent of the designs of Le Corbusier. Instead of a traditional street grid, their street networks are hierarchical, consisting of winding parkways (often lacking sidewalks) that feed into arterial roads or freeway ramps. However, edge cities feature job density similar to that of secondary downtowns found in places such as Newark and Pasadena; indeed, Garreau writes that edge cities' development proves that "density is back!".

== History ==
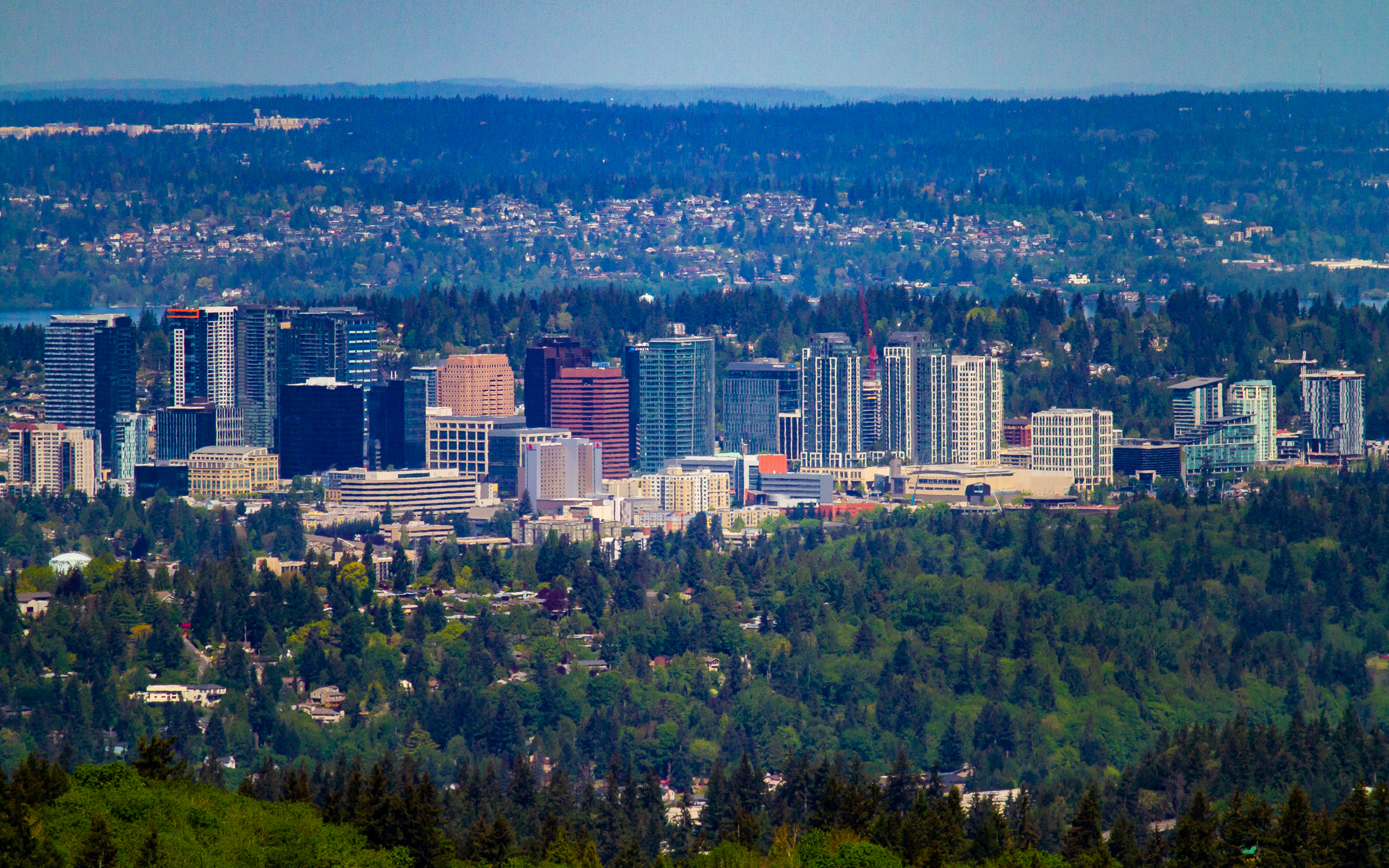
Aerial view of Bellevue, Washington, a typical edge city with a large amount of office and retail space

Garreau shows how edge cities developed in a U.S. context. Starting in the 1950s, businesses were incentivized to open branches in the suburbs and eventually in many cases, leave traditional downtowns entirely, due to increased use of the automobile and move of middle and upper class residents to suburbs, which in turn led to frustration with downtown traffic and lack of parking. Escalating land values in central downtown areas, and the development of communications (telephone, fax, email and other electronic communication) also enabled the trend.

Despite early examples in the 1920s, it was not until car ownership surged in the 1950s, after four decades of fast, steady growth, that it was possible for edge cities to emerge on a large scale. Whereas virtually every American central business district (CBD) or secondary downtown that developed around non-motorized transportation or the streetcar has a pedestrian-friendly grid pattern of relatively narrow streets, most edge cities instead have a hierarchical street arrangement centered on pedestrian-hostile arterial roads, making most of this generation of edge cities difficult to get to and get around with public transportation or by walking, although transit was sometimes added in later decades, such as the Silver Line metro linking Downtown Washington, D.C., with Arlington and Tysons edge cities, and government-planned edge cities in London (Canary Wharf) and Paris (La Défense) integrated transit from the start.

The first edge city was Detroit's New Center, developed in the 1920s, three miles (5 km) north of downtown, as a new downtown for Detroit. New Center and the Miracle Mile section of Wilshire Boulevard in Los Angeles are considered the earliest automobile-oriented urban forms. However the two were built with radically different purposes in mind (New Center as an office park, the Miracle Mile as a retail strip). Garreau's classic example of an edge city is the information technology center Tysons, Virginia, west of Washington, D.C.

=== Outside the U.S. ===
Garreau shows how edge cities have also developed in other countries, specifically citing Canada, Mexico, Australia, and cities such as Paris, London, Karachi, Jakarta, and Tianjin. In the cases of London and Paris he notes how these edge cities developed with government planning and with integrated public transportation.

== Problems ==
=== Mobility ===
Edge cities planned around freeway interchanges have a history of severe traffic problems if one of these freeways goes unbuilt. In particular, Century City, a pioneering 1960s edge city built on a former 20th Century Fox backlot in western Los Angeles, was built with long-term plans for access via an urban rail system and the planned Beverly Hills Freeway. Neither project ever came to fruition, resulting in massive congestion on the surface streets connecting Century City to existing freeways, every two miles (3 km) distant. More than a half-century later, the D Line subway extension will finally provide rail access, with Century City station planned to open in 2027.

=== Sustainability ===
As recently as 2003, some critics believed that edge cities might turn out to have been only a 20th-century phenomenon because of their limitations. The residents of the low-density housing areas around them tend to be fiercely resistant to their outward expansion (as has been the case in Tysons and Century City), but because their internal road networks are severely limited in capacity, densification is more difficult than in the traditional grid network that characterizes traditional CBDs and secondary downtowns. As a result, construction of medium- and high-density housing in edge cities ranges was perceived to be "difficult to impossible". Because most are built at automobile scale, it was felt that "mass transit frequently could not serve them well". Pedestrian access to and circulation within an edge city was perceived to be impractical if not impossible, even if residences are nearby. Revitalization of edge cities was seen to be "the major urban renewal project of the 21st century".

== In the 21st century ==
=== Densification ===
Today, many edge cities have plans for densification, sometimes around a walkable downtown-style core, often with a push for more accessibility by transit and bicycle, and addition of housing in denser, urban-style neighborhoods within the edge city. For example, at Tysons, in the Washington, D.C., metro area, the plan remains to see the city become the downtown core of Fairfax County. To this point "…eight districts have been delimited, with four centered on new metro stations being transit-oriented development districts". Future plans to transportation around the area continue to be made, the accessibility of the area is on the rise with many forms of transportation being formed. "The aims of the plan are for 75% of development to be within half a mile of metro stations, an urban center of 200,000 jobs and 100,000 residents, a jobs balance of 4.0 per household".

=== Outside North America ===
Despite the lessons of the American experience, in rapidly developing countries such as China and India and the United Arab Emirates, the edge city is quickly emerging as an important new development form as automobile ownership skyrockets and marginal land is bulldozed for development. For example, the outskirts of Bangalore, India are increasingly replete with mid-rise mirrored-glass office towers set amid lush gardens and sprawling parking lots where many foreign companies have set up shop. Dubai offers another example.

== Impact ==
=== Relation with metropolitan area ===
The emergence of edge cities has not been without consequences to the metropolitan areas they surround. Edge cities arise from population decentralization from large major core cities and has been ongoing since the 1960s. Shifts in socioeconomics in metro areas (including rising real estate prices during periods of stagnant wages), location of metro industrial areas, and labor competition between edge cities and their more central neighbors have been attributed to their development and continued expansion. There has been a considerable debate among economists as to whether "jobs follow people or people follow jobs," but in the context of the edge city phenomenon, workers have been drawn from metropolitan business hubs in favor of the edge city economy. Developers of edge cities have been shown to strategically plan expansion of such business areas to draw workers away from more dense port cities and thereby keep profits from surrounding interests.

Edge cities contribute greatly to urban development by creating new jobs by attracting workers from the metropolitan areas around it. Also as a result of the rise of edge cities, more department stores, hotels, apartments, and office spaces are created. There are more edge cities than their downtown counterparts of the same size. Garreau states one reason for the rise of edge cities is that, "Today, we have moved our means of creating wealth, the essence of urbanism - our jobs - out to where most of us have lived and shopped for two generations. That has led to the rise of Edge City." In comparison with urban centers edge cities offer global corporations many advantages: cheaper land, security, efficient land communications, advanced technological installations, and a high quality of life for their employees and executives. The appeal of edge cities attract large corporations as well, boosting the already growing city.

=== Impact on economy and industries ===
This concept has showcased the impact that national economies have on the edge city and the surrounding areas. Through Garreau, the term edge city has provided information on how corporate players remain important to the strength of urban and regional subsets. Garreau describes that the edge city has a tendency to have a large service-oriented industry linked to the national economy. The edge city offers supplies to the local area in the form of retail facilities and consumer services. Progressively different services begin to move towards the edge city as the population of corporate businesses increase. The corporate offices fill in space in edge cities and provide connections to exterior locations if decisions are being made from those locales. Not only do corporate, service, and transportation based edge cities exist, but the innovation-driven edge cities will generate extra-metropolitan linkages. These innovative edge cities expand various corporate activities as hosts. Edge cities may create a significant growth in sophisticated retail, entertainment, and consumer service facilities, which in turn leads to a rise in local employment opportunities. The edge city has a tendency to affect the surrounding areas by procuring more opportunities within the labor market. Edge cities are well suited to an economy which is known for a service-oriented market as well as sustaining major manufacturing sectors.

=== Political relations ===
Political groups aid the creation of the edge city in a particular way. There is usually a development commission or similar organization that operates in parallel to, and interact with standard city, county, and state government institutions. Some authors call such commissions private "proto-government" or "shadow governments". According to authors Phelps and Dear, these "shadow governments can tax, legislate for, and police their communities, but they are rarely accountable, are responsive primarily to wealth (as opposed to numbers of voters), and subject to few constitutional constraints", as "edge cities have had substantial investments placed in them". In most cases a "privatopia" is formed within edge city residential areas, where the private housing developments are administered by homeowner associations. In 1964 there were fewer than 500 associations, but "…by 1992, there were 150,000 associations privately governing approximately 32 million Americans".

As with any city, edge cities go through phases of growth and redevelopment. Politics within Edge Cities are unique in that they typically revolve around developing them. They contribute to a "growth machine" that spreads the urbanization of the United States. They can obscure smaller settlements that are also going through similar phases of redevelopment. Depending on the size of the settlements the modes of urban politics can change. "State interventions are important both conceptually and to the empirical matter of this article since the extent, timing, nature, and legacies of state interventions significantly shape the mode of urban politics in different places and in a single place over time". State interventions are essential to the politics in developing edge cities. Tysons, Virginia is an example that went through the process of development due to the county government's aggressive recruitment of businesses. Similar methods of development can be seen and applied to other edge cities as well. Tysons recruited businesses with the promise of growth in the future. More businesses coming in allowed for the city to grow which led to the businesses growing as well. A chain reaction was created which crafted the modern-day Tysons. This community was also an example of politics playing a role in developing an edge city. It could be traced to a special commission established at the request of the Fairfax County Board of Supervisors that examined the fiscal capacity of the County vis-à-vis perceived shortfalls in collective consumption expenditures (County of Fairfax 1976a).

== See also ==
- Bedroom community
- Boomburbs
- List of edge cities
- Urban sprawl
