= List of edge cities =

This is a list of edge cities by continent, country and metropolitan area.

== Definition ==
An edge city is a term coined by Joel Garreau's in his 1991 book Edge City: Life on the New Frontier, for a place in a metropolitan area, outside cities' original downtowns (thus, in the suburbs or, if within the city limits of the central city, an area of suburban density), with a large concentration of jobs, office space, and retail space. Originally, Garreau defined edge cities in the North American context, though he gave some examples outside North America. To qualify under Garreau's rules, an edge city:

- has five million or more square feet (465,000 m^{2}) of leasable office space
- has 600,000 square feet (56,000 m^{2}) or more of leasable retail space
- has more jobs than bedrooms
- is perceived by the population as one place
- was nothing like a "city" as recently as 30 years ago. As Garreau stated, "[then] it was just bedrooms, if not cow pastures."

== List by country and metropolitan area ==
This list is incomplete. You can help by expanding it with entries that meet the criteria and that reference a reliable source. Note: "Emerging 1991" indicated that Garreau assessed this area as an emerging edge city in his 1991 book.

=== Canada ===
==== Montreal ====
- Laval

==== Toronto ====
- Brampton
- Mississauga
- Markham
- Vaughan Metropolitan Centre

==== Vancouver ====
- Surrey
- Richmond

=== Chile ===
==== Santiago ====
- Providencia (Providencia, Chile)
- Sanhattan/Las Condes area

=== France ===
==== Paris ====
- La Défense
- Noisy-le-Grand

=== Korea (South) ===
==== Seoul ====
- Bundang
- Ilsan

=== Mexico ===
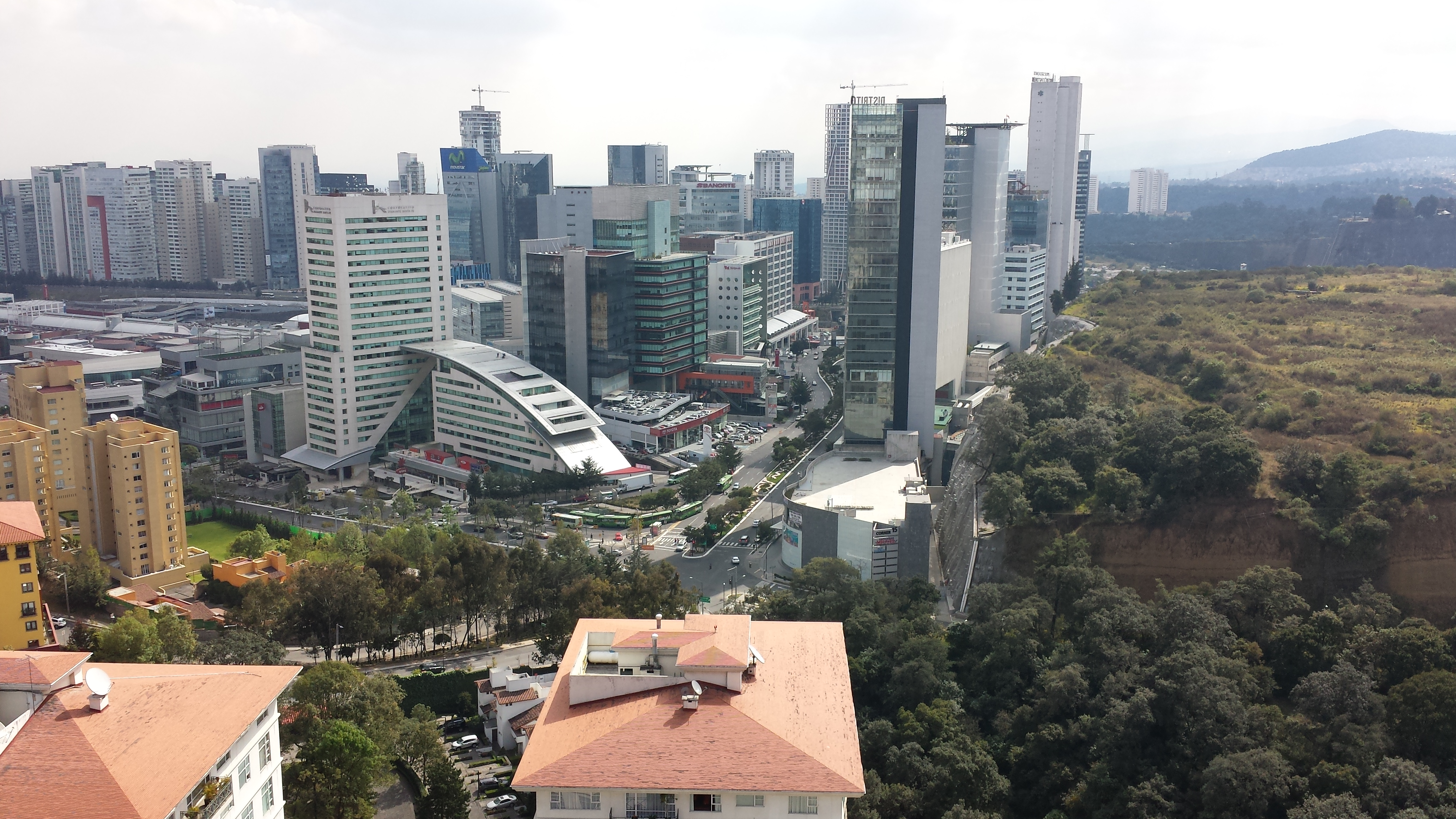
Santa Fe, Mexico City

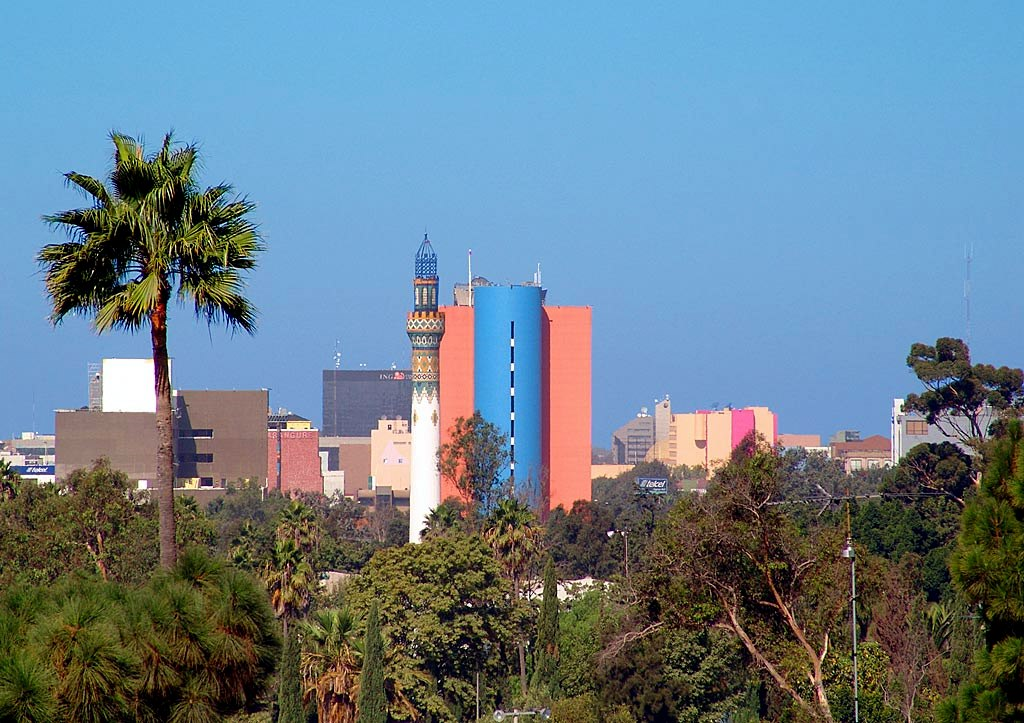
Zona Río, largest commercial area in Tijuana, master-planned in the 1980s

==== Monterrey ====
- San Pedro Garza García
- San Nicolás de los Garza

==== Guadalajara ====
- Zapopan

==== Mexico City ====
- Interlomas
- Santa Fe

==== Tijuana ====
- Zona Río: built in the 1980s and the city's new commercial center, the Zona Río and contiguous Agua Caliente submarkets had, in 2016, a total of 136,102 square metres (1,464,990 sq ft) of office space, in addition to having the city's largest concentration of retail, hospitality, and other commercial facilities, and hospitals.

=== Turkey ===
==== Istanbul ====
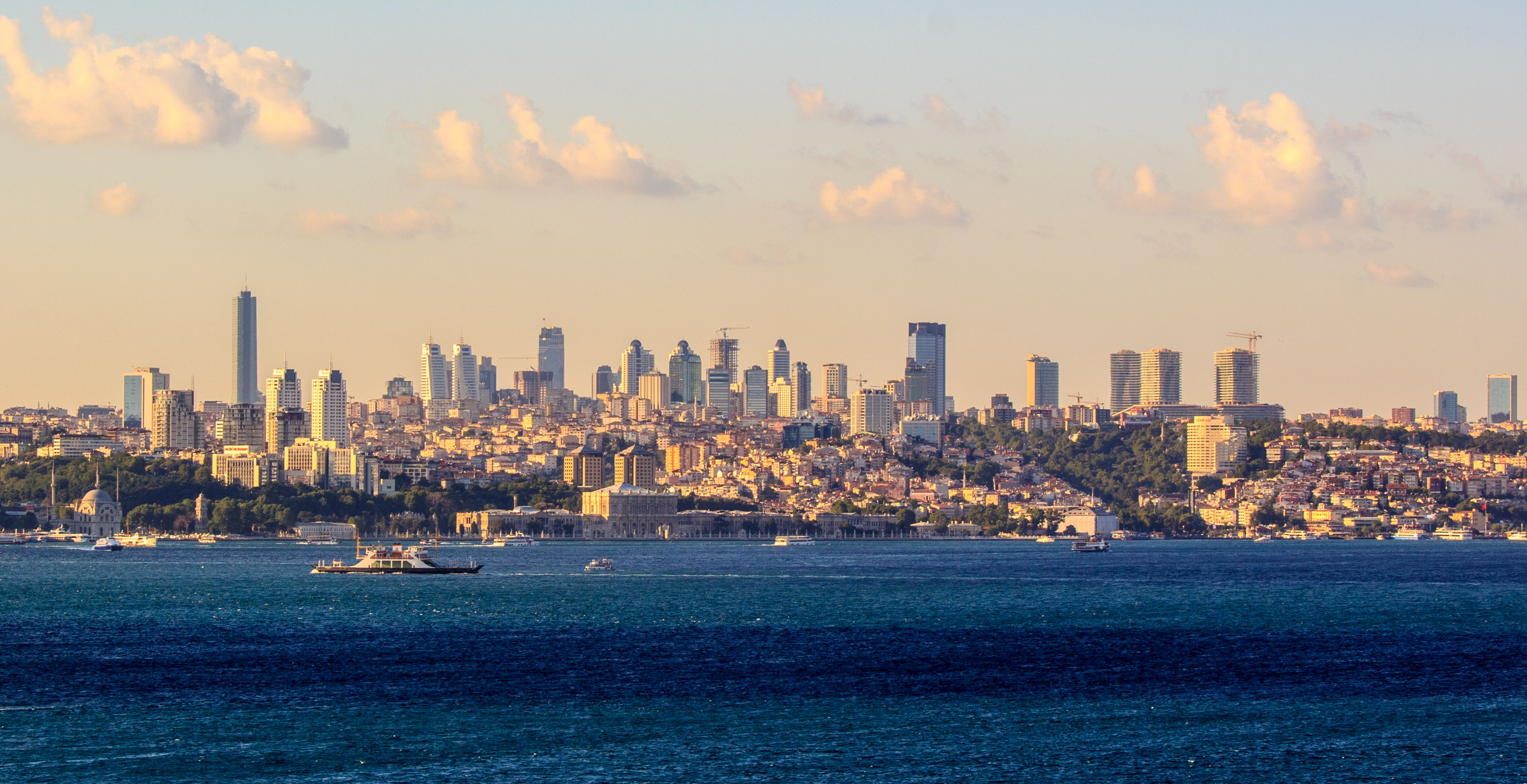
Levent skyline seen from the Bosphorus

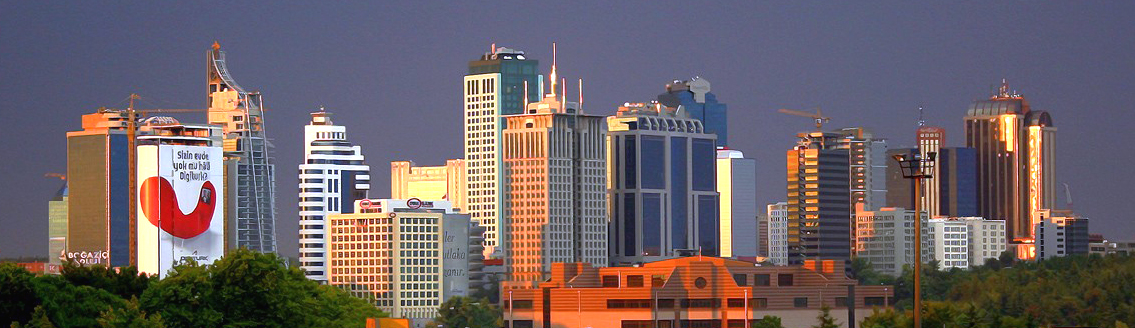
Maslak skyline (2007)

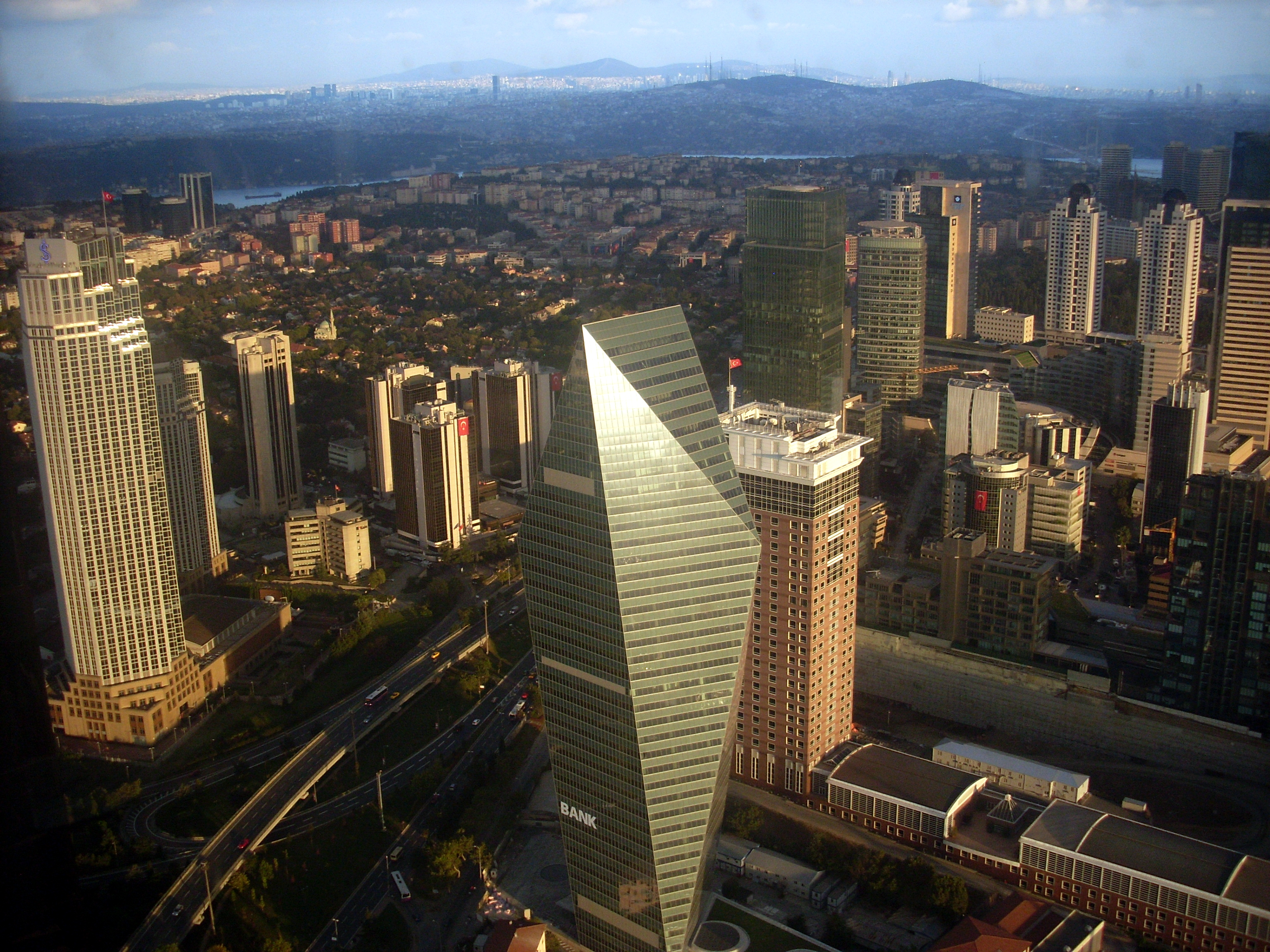
View of Levent and beyond from Istanbul Sapphire mall

The historic city center is in Fatih and contains historic sites, the Grand Bazaar and adjacent wholesale/retail districts, but is not a modern "central business district" in that it does not have modern retail formats, dense residential and hotel towers, etc. These can be found in the following edge cities with concentrations of office space, malls, residential towers, entertainment and educational facilities, hospitals, etc.:

- Taksim-Beyoğlu: Taksim Square in Beyoğlu to Nişantaşı in Şişli
- The Istanbul Central Business District as the real estate industry refers to it, which is not the historic city center, but is a 7-km-long north-south corridor of modern areas along Barbaros Boulevard and Büyükdere Avenue. Metro Line 2 runs along part of it. From south to north, the areas in the corridor are:
  - in Beşiktaş district:
    - Balmumcu
    - Gayrettepe incl. Profilo, Astoria and Trump Towers (Trump Alışveriş Merkezi) complexes
    - Etiler including Boğaziçi University
  - in Şişli district:
    - Fulya, Otim and the core Şişli neighborhood incl. the İstanbul Cevahir complex
    - Esentepe including Zincirlikuyu and the Zorlu Center complex
    - Levent including the Metrocity, Özdilekpark and Istanbul Sapphire complexes
  - in Sarıyer district:
    - Maslak including the İstinye Park complex and the Istanbul Technical University
    - the Vadistanbul mall and office complexes in Ayazağa
- Istanbul Atatürk Airport area: strip development along the O-7 highway north to the Mall of Istanbul, Bahçelievler district
- Asian side:
  - Kozyatagi in Kadıköy district incl. Palladium complex
  - Altunizade in Üsküdar district, site of the Capitol Shopping Center
  - Kavacık in Beykoz district
  - Ümraniye district incl. the Akyaka Park, Oryapark and Canpark complexes

=== United Kingdom ===
==== London ====
- Canary Wharf
- Croydon

=== United States ===
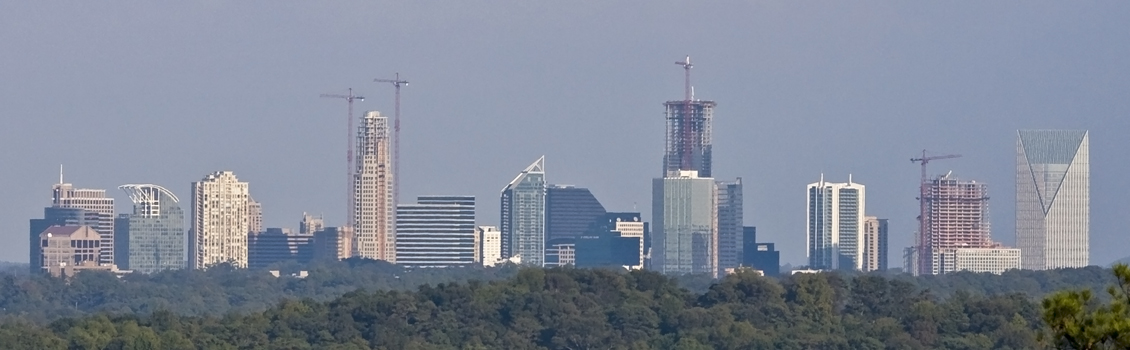
Skyline of Buckhead, Atlanta

==== Atlanta ====
- Airport area (incl. parts of College Park/Hapeville/East Point, emerging 1991)
- Brookhaven I-85 and Buford Highway corridors incl. Lenox Park, Century Center, Executive Park, Corporate Square, Northeast Plaza
- Buckhead
- Cumberland (Cumberland Mall/Cobb Galleria Centre area near I-285/I-75) – home to Cobb Energy Performing Arts Centre and Truist Park
- Gwinnett Place/Sugarloaf business districts along I-85, near interchange with SR 316 (emerging 1991)
- Johns Creek Technology Park
- Midtown Atlanta (emerging 1991)
- Perimeter Center (I-285 and Georgia 400, emerging 1991)

==== Austin ====
- The Domain-Northwest area
- Highland area
- South Round Rock

==== Baltimore ====
- Columbia
- Hanover, Maryland
- Hunt Valley
- Owings Mills
- Security Boulevard
- Towson
- White Marsh

==== Birmingham ====
- Brookwood Village area
- Inverness (Hwy 280/I-459 interchange area, incl. The Summit)
- Hoover (Riverchase area near Hwy 31/I-459)

==== Boston ====
- Alewife T Station area
- Braintree Split area
- Burlington Mall area
- Foxborough
- Framingham/Natick area
- Massachusetts Turnpike and I-495
- Massachusetts Turnpike and Route 128
- Route 128 and Interstate 93
- Nashua, New Hampshire
- Peabody-Danvers
- Salem, New Hampshire

==== Charlotte ====
- SouthEnd
- SouthPark
- University City
- Concord
- Ballantyne

==== Chicago ====
- I-88 ”Illinois Technology and Research Corridor” incl. parts of Oak Brook, Lisle, Naperville, Aurora along the East-West Tollway, Oakbrook Terrace, Lombard
- I-94 "Lake Shore Corridor": including parts of Skokie, Northbrook, Deerfield, Buffalo Grove Lincolnshire, Vernon Hills, Lake Forest

==== Cleveland ====
- Chagrin Boulevard and Interstate 271 area (Beachwood)
- Rockside Road and Interstate 77 area (Independence) - emerging 1991

==== Denver ====
- Greenwood Village - Denver Tech Ctr

==== Detroit ====
- Ann Arbor–Briarwood Mall area
- Southfield Town Center Complex
- Troy–Big Beaver Road area

==== Indianapolis ====
- Carmel
- Fishers

==== Kansas City ====
- College Boulevard–Overland Park area
- Country Club Plaza area
- Crown Center area
- Kansas City International Airport area

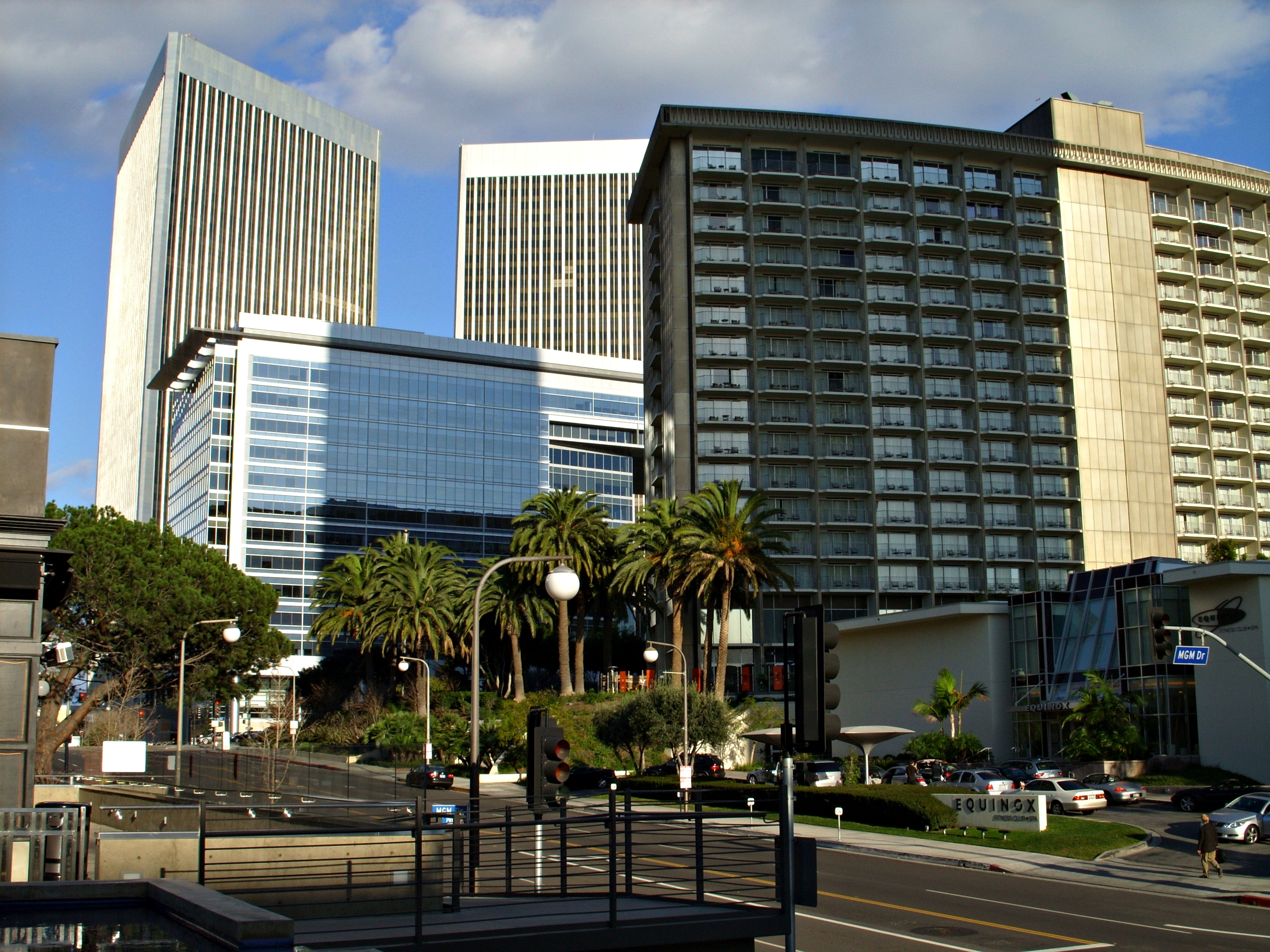
Century City, Los Angeles

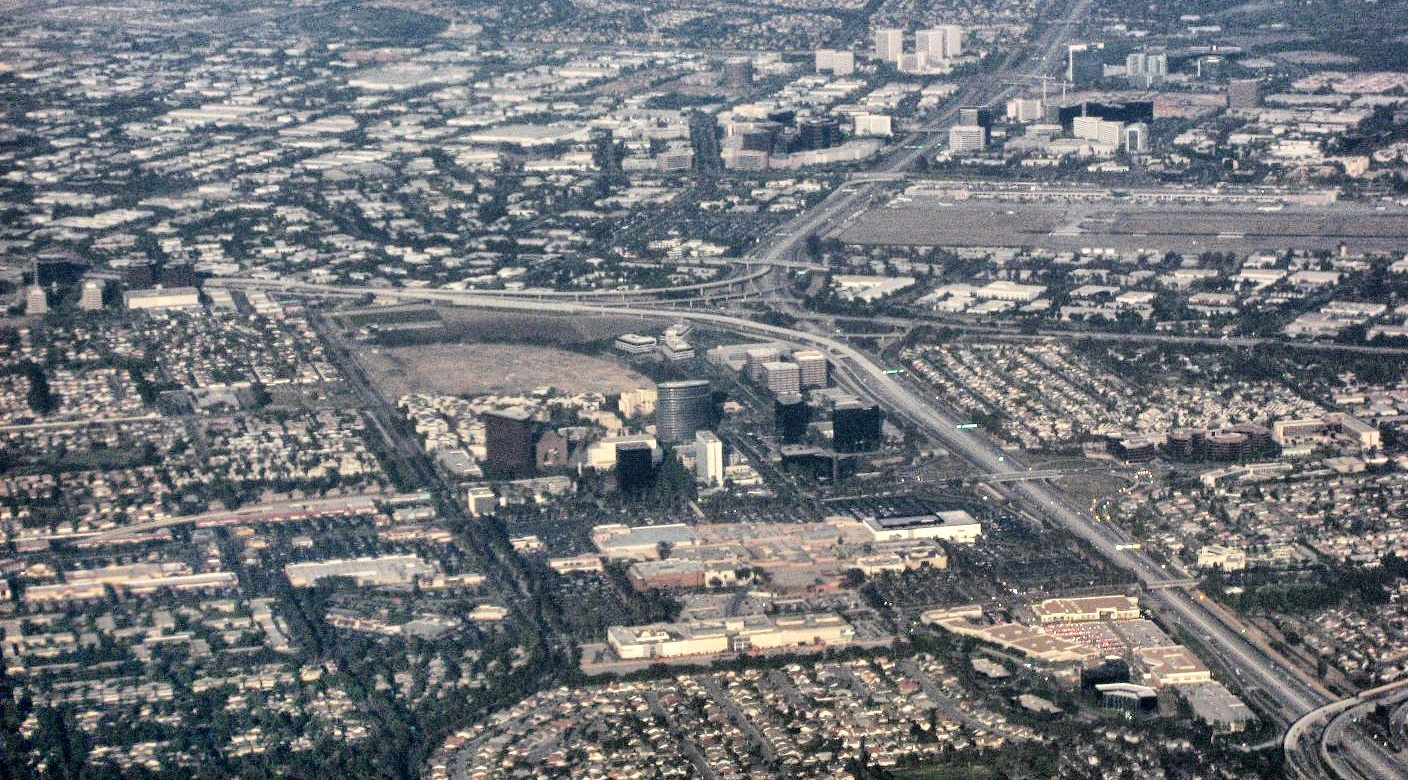
Aerial view of the South Coast Plaza–John Wayne Airport edge city: Irvine Business Complex (top), John Wayne Airport runway (upper center), South Coast Metro buildings (lower center) and below, the South Coast Plaza mall

==== Greater Los Angeles ====
- Central Los Angeles and Westside
  - Beverly Hills/Century City
  - LAX/El Segundo
  - Marina Del Rey/Culver City
  - Mid-Wilshire
  - Miracle Mile
  - West Los Angeles
- San Fernando Valley
  - Burbank/North Hollywood
  - Sherman Oaks/Van Nuys, Los Angeles
  - Warner Center, Los Angeles/West Valley
- Elsewhere in Los Angeles County
  - Pasadena
  - South Bay/Torrance/Carson
  - South Valley/Covina (emerging 1991)
  - Valencia (emerging 1991)
- Orange County
  - Anaheim–Santa Ana edge city
  - Fullerton/La Habra/Brea (emerging 1991)
  - Irvine Spectrum
  - Newport Center/Fashion Island (emerging 1991)
  - San Clemente/Laguna Niguel (emerging 1991)
  - South Coast Plaza–John Wayne Airport edge city
  - Westminster/Huntington Beach
- Other counties
  - Ontario Airport/Rancho Cucamonga
  - Riverside (emerging 1991)
  - San Bernardino (emerging 1991)
  - Ventura/Coastal Plain (emerging 1991)

==== Miami/Fort Lauderdale/West Palm Beach ====
- Aventura
- Boca Raton/Town Center at Boca Raton are
- Coral Gables
- Coral Springs
- Corporate Park at Cypress Creek area/Oakland Park
- Kendall/Dadeland
- Deerfield Beach
- Delray Beach
- Doral
- Flagami area/Miami International Airport area
- Hallandale Beach
- Hollywood
- Palm Beach Gardens/The Gardens Mall area
- Pembroke Pines
- Pompano Beach
- Sunrise/Sawgrass Mills area
- Wilton Manors

==== Milwaukee ====
- Brookfield

==== Minneapolis ====
- Bloomington (southern I-494 west of the airport)
- Golden Valley
- St. Louis Park

==== Nashville ====
- Franklin

==== New York City ====
- New York State
  - Nassau Co., Long Island: Great Neck-Lake Success, Mitchel Field-Garden City
  - Suffolk Co., Long Island: Hauppauge, New York State Route 110-Melville,
  - Westchester Co.: White Plains area, Purchase/Rye, Tarrytown (emerging 1991)
- Connecticut
  - Stamford–Greenwich
  - Westport and I-95 North area
- New Jersey
  - Bergen Co.: Fort Lee, Paramus–Montvale, Mahwah
  - Hudson Co.: Meadowlands–Hoboken, Newark International Airport–Jersey City (emerging 1991)
  - Middlesex Co.: Woodbridge area, Metropark station area
  - Mercer Co.: U.S. 1–Princeton
  - Morris Co.: Whippany–Parsippany–Troy Hills (287/80 area), Morristown (emerging 1991)
  - Bridgewater Commons 287/78 area (Bridgewater/Somerville)

==== Philadelphia ====
- Lower Bucks County, Pennsylvania
- Willow Grove
- Horsham/Ft. Washington
- Plymouth Meeting
- Conshohocken
- King of Prussia
- U.S. Route 202 Corridor around Malvern
- West Chester/Exton
- Upper Main Line
- Bala Cynwyd
- Delaware County
- Cherry Hill, New Jersey

==== Raleigh/Durham (Research Triangle) ====
- Research Triangle Park
- North Hills (Raleigh)

==== Sacramento ====
- Arden Fair Mall-California State Fair area (emerging 1991)
- Natomas area between downtown and airport (emerging 1991)

==== San Diego ====
- Mission Valley
- Kearny Mesa
- "North City" edge city: University City, eastern edge of La Jolla, Sorrento Mesa/Sorrento Valley, Torrey Pines, Del Mar Heights/Carmel Valley
- North Coast area (Encinitas to Oceanside along I-5)
- Interstate 15 north area (Marine Corps Air Station Miramar to Escondido), incl. the Carmel Mountain Ranch/Rancho Bernardo area, which has more than 6 million sq. ft. of office space, the 5th-largest submarket in the metro area.

==== San Francisco Bay Area ====
East:

- Berkeley including Emeryville (emerging 1991)
- Concord
- Contra Costa Centre/Pleasant Hill BART station area (emerging 1991)
- Walnut Creek
- Danville-Bishop Ranch-San Ramon
- Dublin-Pleasanton-Livermore

South:

- Daly City-northern San Mateo County area (emerging 1991)
- San Francisco International Airport area in and near South San Francisco
- Redwood City-northern San Mateo County area (emerging 1991)
- Silicon Valley: San Jose-Cupertino-Santa Clara-Sunnyvale-Mountain View-Palo Alto

Saint Louis

- Clayton
- Maryland Heights/Westport

==== Washington, DC ====
in Howard County, Maryland:

- part of Columbia

in Montgomery County, Maryland:

- Bethesda-Chevy Chase-Upper Wisconsin Avenue NW, D.C.
- Democracy Blvd.-North Bethesda-White Flint Mall area (I-270/Beltway)
- Gaithersburg-Germantown-I-270
- Rockville-I-270
- Shady Grove
- Silver Spring
- Wheaton

in Prince George's County, Maryland

- Lanham-Landover-Largo (Beltway and U.S. Route 50 east around New Carrollton station)
- Laurel–I-95 north (emerging 1991)
- Bowie New Town (emerging 1991)
- National Harbor/PortAmerica–Southern I-95 (emerging 1991)

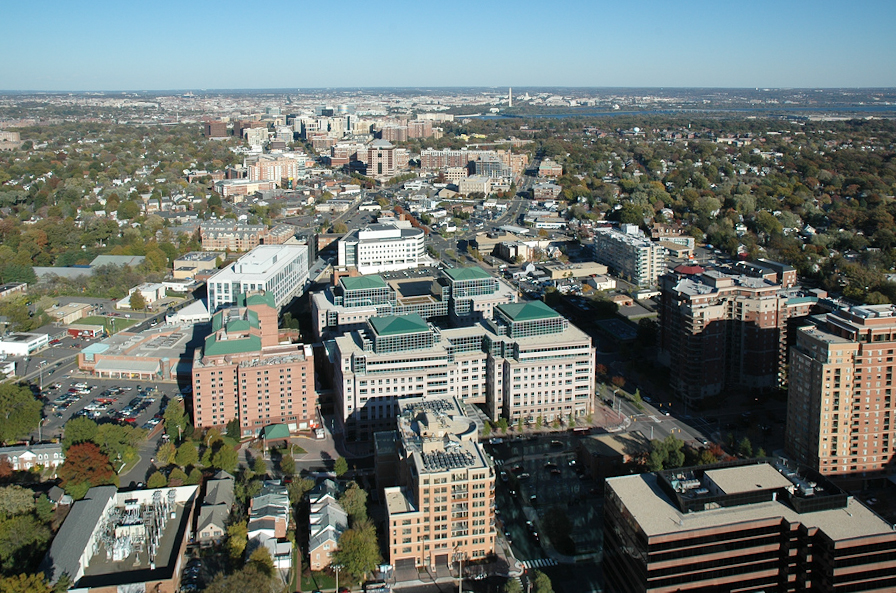
The Rosslyn–Ballston Corridor in Arlington near Washington, D.C.

in Arlington County, Virginia:

- Rosslyn-Ballston
- Crystal City

in Alexandria, Virginia:

- Old Town Alexandria
- I-395 corridor (emerging 1991)
- Eisenhower Valley area (emerging 1991)

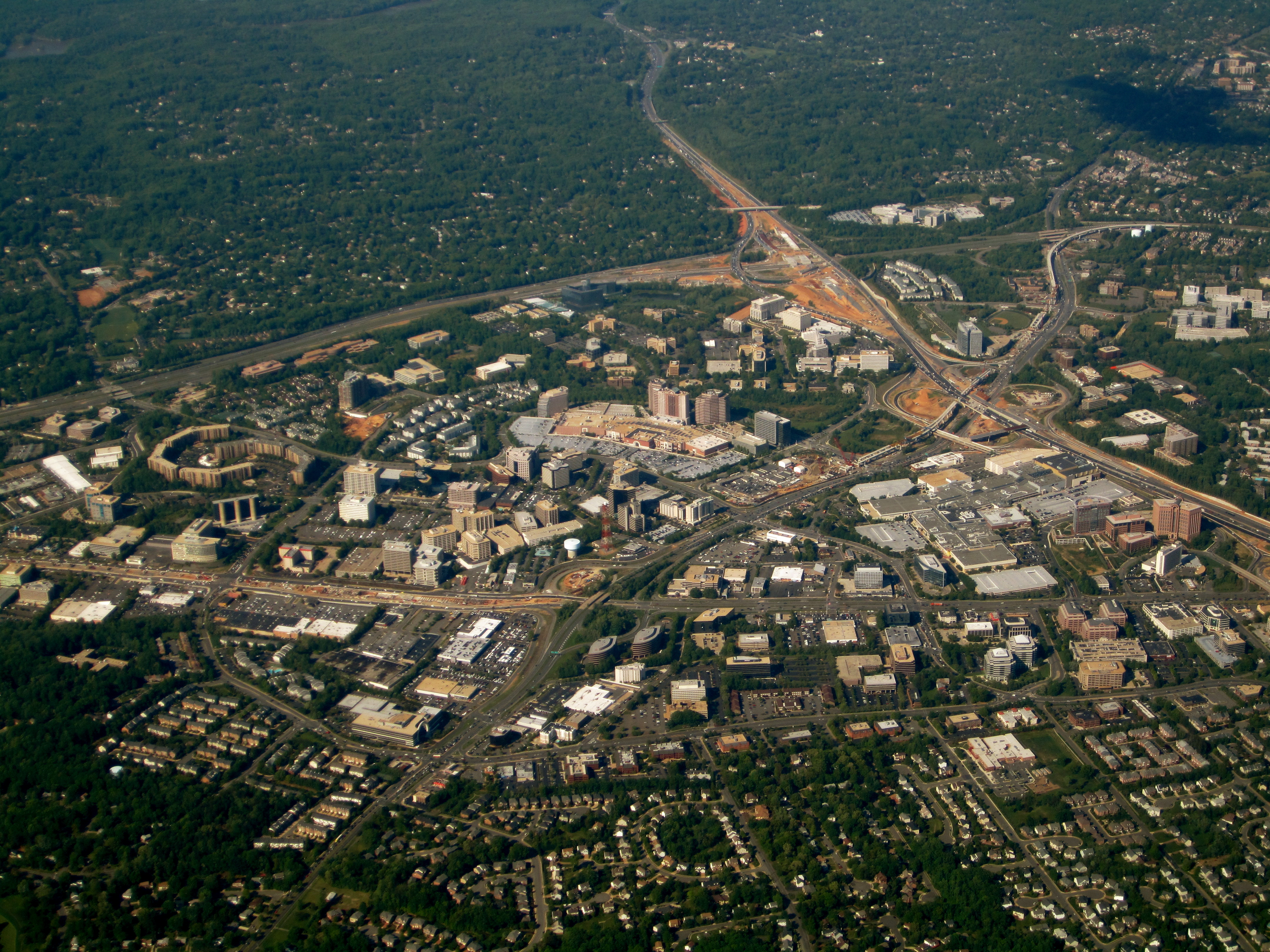
Aerial view of Tysons, Virginia

in Fairfax County, Virginia:

- Tysons, formerly Tysons Corner
- Dulles Technology Corridor: parts of Reston, Herndon and Dulles including the Dulles Airport-Route 28 area
- Fairfax Centre-Fair Oaks Mall area (I-66/Route 50)
- Merrifield (Beltway/Route 50 West)

Emerging edge cities in Virginia, as of 1991:

- Greater Leesburg–Route 7 area, Loudoun County
- Gainesville, Prince William County
