= List of United States tornadoes in December 2021 =

United States tornadoes in December 2021
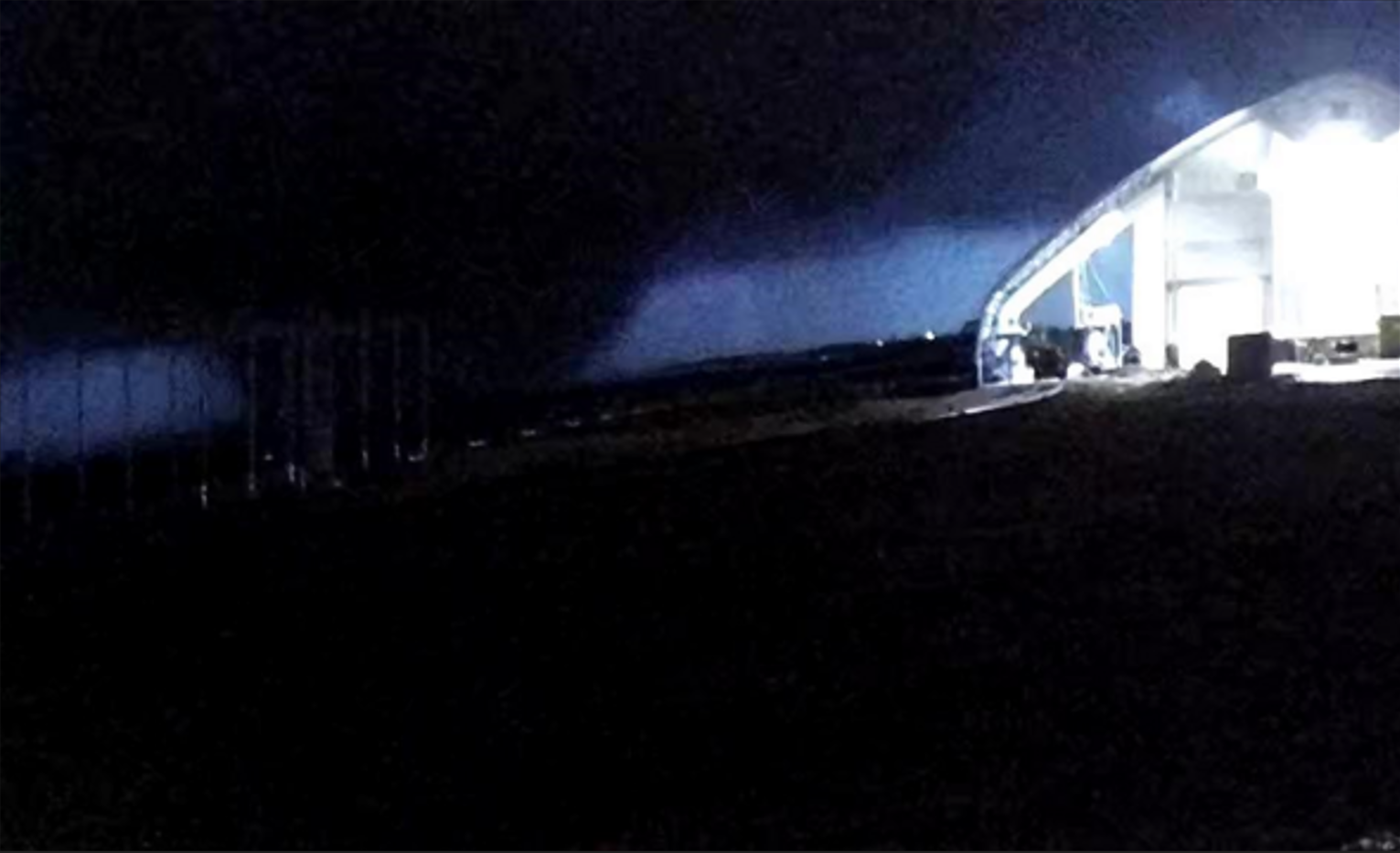
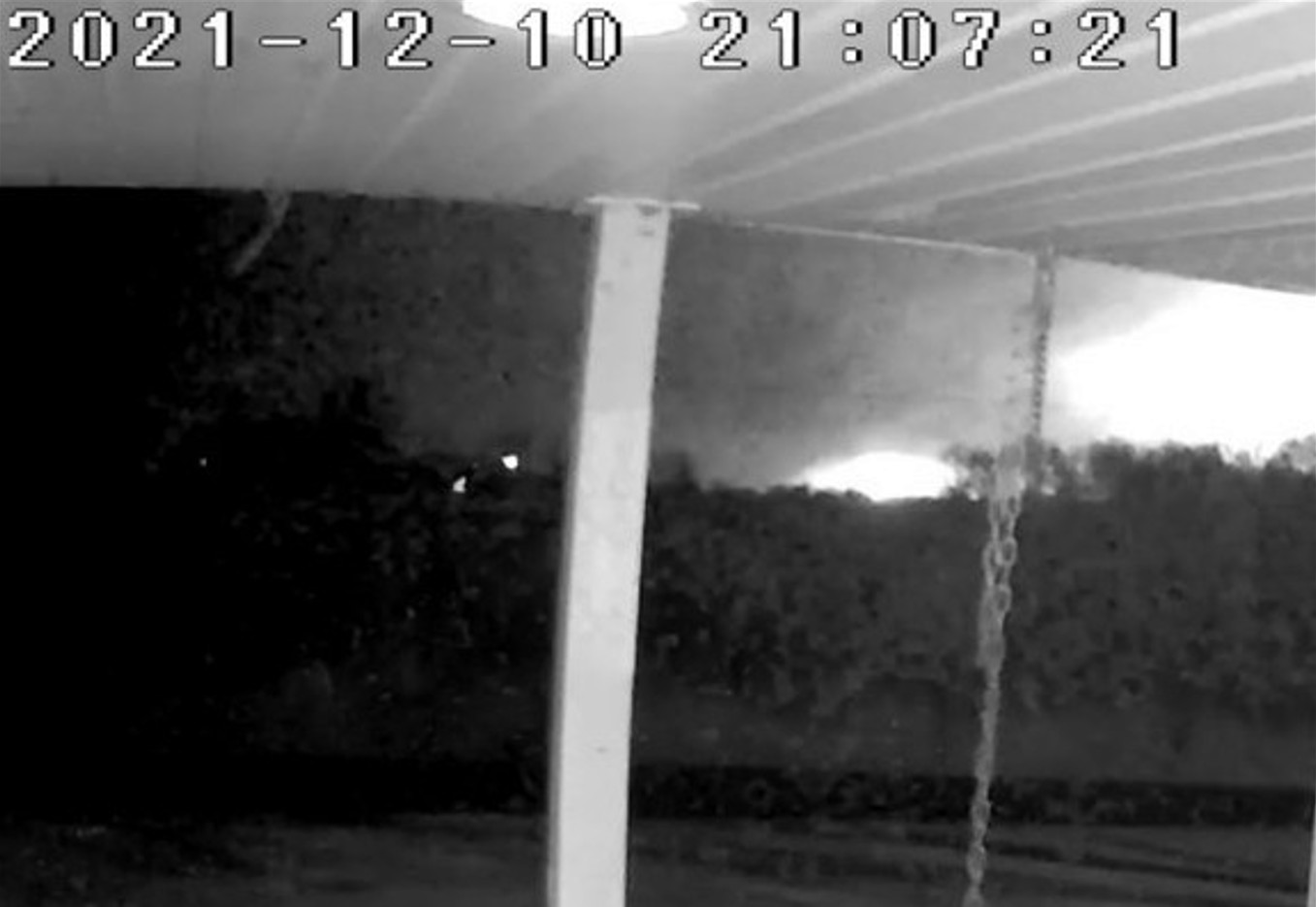
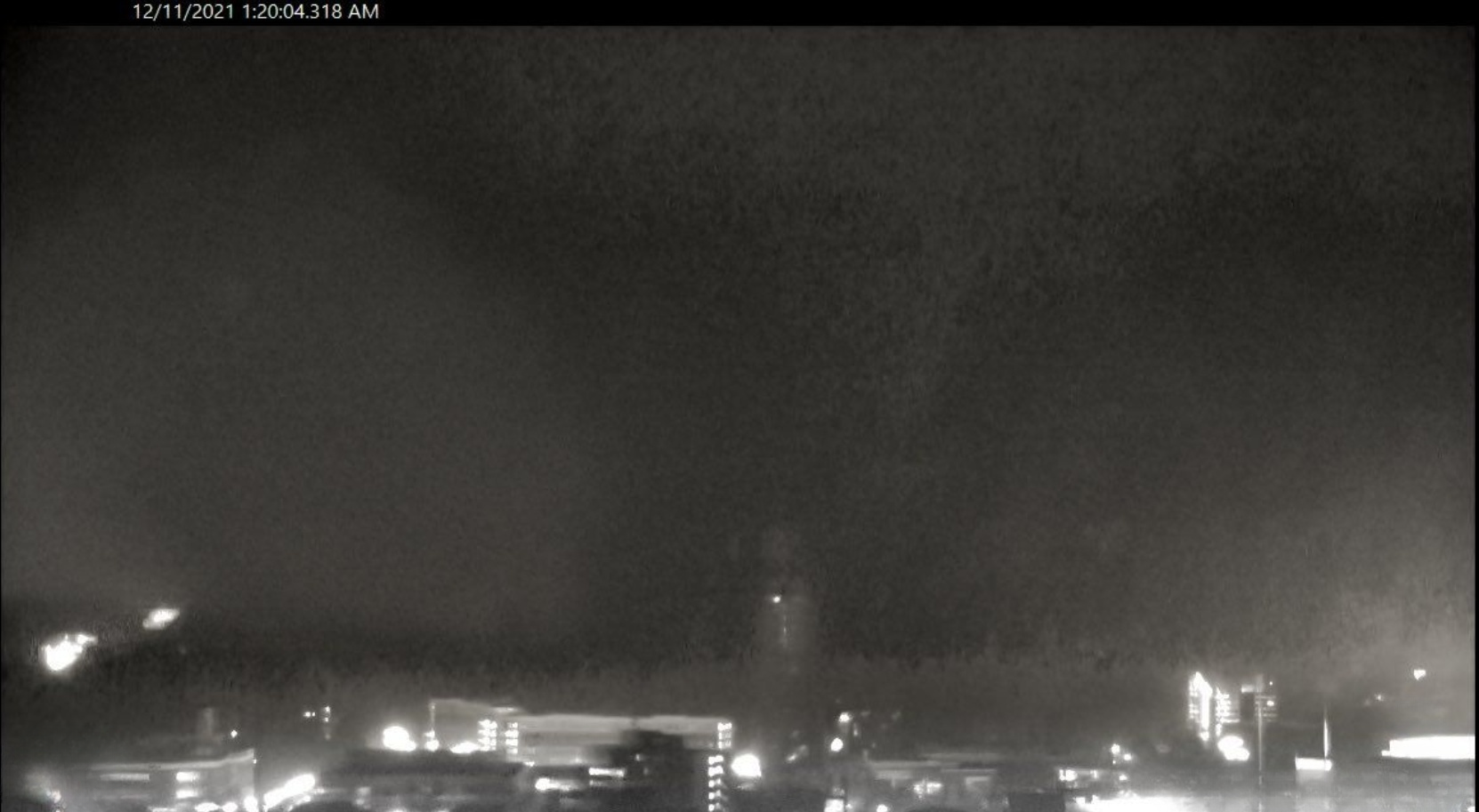
- Clockwise from top: An EF4 tornado over areas near Samburg, Tennessee on December 10; A strong EF3 tornado moving over Bowling Green, Kentucky on December 11; A deadly EF4 tornado as it was near Cayce, Kentucky on December 10.
- Timespan: December 5–31
- Maximum rated tornado: EF4 tornado: Shade, Missouri–Blue Bank, Tennessee on December 10; Cayce–Bremen, Kentucky on December 10
- Tornadoes: 227
- Fatalities: 89
- Injuries: 895

This page documents all tornadoes confirmed by various weather forecast offices of the National Weather Service in the United States in December 2021. In December, tornadoes are most likely in the southern states due to their proximity to the unstable airmass and warm waters of the Gulf of Mexico, with only occasional incursions farther north. The average number of tornadoes in December is 28.

After a small outbreak along with some isolated tornadoes at the beginning of the month, December unexpectedly produced two large, record-breaking tornado outbreaks during the middle of the month. The first one spawned 71 tornadoes, the most tornadoes ever recorded in a single outbreak in December. One supercell tracked over 250 miles (400 km) throughout the states of Missouri, Tennessee, Arkansas, Kentucky, spawning a family of 11 tornadoes, including two violent EF4 tornadoes. The first one killed eight people across three states while the second one killed 57 people in Kentucky along a track of over 160 miles (260 km). The outbreak killed 89 people, making it the deadliest outbreak ever recorded in December. However, the record number of tornadoes set by the first outbreak was shattered just four days later by a historic derecho that produced 120 tornadoes across the Midwestern United States. The outbreak was unprecedented since tornadoes in that region during late fall and early winter are rare, but tornadoes were confirmed as far north as southwestern Wisconsin. The derecho produced 61 tornadoes in Iowa, including 21 EF2 tornadoes, which set the record for the most tornadoes and the most EF2+ tornadoes ever recorded in the state during a single day. It also spawned tornadoes in Minnesota, marking the first time that December tornadoes had ever been recorded in the state. Some additional isolated activity and another small outbreak at the end of the month occurred before the month ended.

In all, 227 tornadoes were confirmed during December, making it by far the most active December on record as it more than doubled the previous record of 99 set in 2002. It also set the record for the most active month for tornado activity in meteorological winter, surpassing the previous record of 216 set in January 1999.

== United States yearly total ==
Confirmed tornadoes by Enhanced Fujita rating
| EFU | EF0 | EF1 | EF2 | EF3 | EF4 | EF5 | Total |
|---|---|---|---|---|---|---|---|
| 210 | 545 | 433 | 103 | 21 | 3 | 0 | 1,315 |

== December ==
Confirmed tornadoes by Enhanced Fujita rating
| EFU | EF0 | EF1 | EF2 | EF3 | EF4 | EF5 | Total |
|---|---|---|---|---|---|---|---|
| 7 | 59 | 104 | 49 | 6 | 2 | 0 | 227 |

=== December 5 event ===
List of confirmed tornadoes – Sunday, December 5, 2021 (Note: All dates are based on the local time zone where the tornado touched down; however, all times are in Coordinated Universal Time for consistency.)
| EF# | Location | County / Parish | State | Start Coord. | Time (UTC) | Path length | Max width |
|---|---|---|---|---|---|---|---|
| EF0 | WNW of Ledbetter | Livingston | KY | 37.0641°N 88.5377°W | 02:24–02:25 | 0.29 mi (0.47 km) | 25 yd (23 m) |
| EF0 | A tornado crossed the Ohio River, ripping the flag off a flagpole attached to the bow of a vessel. | | | | | | |
| EF1 | E of Highlandville | Christian | MO | 36.951°N 93.253°W | 04:02–04:07 | 3.43 mi (5.52 km) | 100 yd (91 m) |
| EF1 | This tornado touched down west of U.S. 65, where trees were uprooted and a pool house was pushed off of its foundation. More tree damage occurred after it crossed U.S. 65, and an outbuilding was destroyed before it lifted. | | | | | | |
| EF1 | West Frankfort | Franklin | IL | 37.90°N 88.97°W | 04:21–04:28 | 3.88 mi (6.24 km) | 175 yd (160 m) |
| EF1 | Homes, businesses, and trees were damaged. | | | | | | |

=== December 6 event ===
List of confirmed tornadoes – Monday, December 6, 2021
| EF# | Location | County / Parish | State | Start Coord. | Time (UTC) | Path length | Max width |
|---|---|---|---|---|---|---|---|
| EF1 | N of Frankfort | Franklin | KY | 38.2337°N 84.8811°W | 09:10–09:11 | 1.5 mi (2.4 km) | 50 yd (46 m) |
| EF1 | A brief tornado with an intermittent path caused significant roof and structural damage to two well-built barns and a two-story house, with a Ring doorbell camera catching the tornado on video. One of the barns was large tool chests and other heavy items scattered around and its concrete foundation shifted about an inch; a house next to the barn was undamaged. Numerous trees were twisted or uprooted along the path. | | | | | | |
| EF1 | Stamping Ground | Scott | KY | 38.2652°N 84.6827°W | 09:22–09:23 | 0.25 mi (0.40 km) | 60 yd (55 m) |
| EF1 | Several trailers at a mobile home park were lifted off of their foundations and flipped or turned. Siding and insulation were thrown into nearby trees. Deck pieces were impaled into the ground. Outbuildings were lofted and thrown, and trees were snapped. Two people were injured. | | | | | | |
| EF0 | SE of Wingo to N of Cuba | Graves | KY | 36.62°N 88.72°W | 09:23–09:29 | 5.92 mi (9.53 km) | 100 yd (91 m) |
| EF0 | A few barns and a chicken house were damaged, and trees and large branches were downed. | | | | | | |
| EF1 | NE of Lynnville to SW of Murray | Graves, Calloway | KY | 36.59°N 88.53°W | 09:34–09:43 | 9.57 mi (15.40 km) | 500 yd (460 m) |
| EF1 | Three large pole barns were destroyed, homes sustained roof damage, and trees were snapped or uprooted. | | | | | | |
| EF1 | Northern Elkton | Todd | KY | 36.83°N 87.22°W | 10:33–10:42 | 8.58 mi (13.81 km) | 100 yd (91 m) |
| EF1 | This tornado began northwest of Elkton and skirted the northern edge of town, where several older barns were heavily damaged or destroyed, and two semi-trailers were flipped over. | | | | | | |
| EF0 | S of Elkton | Todd | KY | 36.74°N 87.17°W | 10:40–10:45 | 4.43 mi (7.13 km) | 75 yd (69 m) |
| EF0 | Several sheds sustained roof damage and/or wall collapse. | | | | | | |
| EF0 | Hartsville | Trousdale | TN | 36.385°N 86.2221°W | 11:59–12:05 | 4.77 mi (7.68 km) | 100 yd (91 m) |
| EF0 | A couple barns and outbuildings were destroyed, and an RV was blown on top of a flipped school bus; the bus driver was uninjured. Numerous trees were downed along the path as well. This was the first recorded tornado to strike Trousdale County in the month of December. | | | | | | |
| EF0 | W of Lawrenceburg | Lawrence | TN | 35.234°N 87.544°W | 12:34–12:35 | 0.27 mi (0.43 km) | 25 yd (23 m) |
| EF0 | Trees were uprooted. | | | | | | |
| EF0 | Slagle | Vernon | LA | 31.2°N 93.13°W | 12:55–12:56 | 0.24 mi (0.39 km) | 10 yd (9.1 m) |
| EF0 | Multiple trees were damaged or downed. | | | | | | |
| EF0 | N of Livingston | Overton | TN | 36.4755°N 85.3063°W | 12:56–12:59 | 2.64 mi (4.25 km) | 100 yd (91 m) |
| EF0 | The metal roof of a home was blown off, and outbuildings and the roofs of several barns were damaged. Trees were downed along the path. This was the first recorded tornado to strike Overton County in the month of December. | | | | | | |
| EF0 | S of Midway | Overton, Pickett | TN | 36.479°N 85.195°W | 13:04–13:07 | 3.02 mi (4.86 km) | 200 yd (180 m) |
| EF0 | Several outbuildings were destroyed, and fencing around a recycling plant was damaged. Trees were downed along the path. | | | | | | |
| EF1 | SW of Normandy to NE of Tullahoma | Bedford, Moore, Coffee | TN | 35.3945°N 86.3314°W | 13:40–13:48 | 7.97 mi (12.83 km) | 100 yd (91 m) |
| EF1 | A wall was blown down at a community center in Raus. A large barn lost part of its roof. Signs and outbuildings were damaged on the northern side of Tullahoma. Trees were uprooted or snapped. This was the first tornado ever recorded in Coffee County in the month of December. | | | | | | |
| EF0 | NW of Falkville | Morgan | AL | 34.39°N 86.95°W | 15:05–15:10 | 1.33 mi (2.14 km) | 100 yd (91 m) |
| EF0 | A few large tree branches were downed. | | | | | | |
| EF0 | SE of Covington to Abita Springs | St. Tammany | LA | 30.438°N 90.0813°W | 20:56–21:00 | 2.13 mi (3.43 km) | 75 yd (69 m) |
| EF0 | The tornado damaged the Hollycrest Plaza Mall in Covington, collapsing an exterior wall. Minor roof and tree damage also occurred. | | | | | | |

=== December 8 event ===
List of confirmed tornadoes – Wednesday, December 8, 2021
| EF# | Location | County / Parish | State | Start Coord. | Time (UTC) | Path length | Max width |
|---|---|---|---|---|---|---|---|
| EF0 | W of Freeport | Walton | FL | 30.4952°N 86.1819°W | 06:07–06:13 | 1.74 mi (2.80 km) | 50 yd (46 m) |
| EF0 | A brief tornado downed a few trees and blew out windows of a house. A tornado debris signature was observed on radar. | | | | | | |
| EF1 | Starke | Bradford | FL | 29.9412°N 82.1101°W | 22:20–22:22 | 0.54 mi (0.87 km) | 200 yd (180 m) |
| EF1 | One home was shifted off its foundation due to a fallen tree. Several other homes were damaged by fallen trees. Metal roof panels were torn off a canopy. | | | | | | |

=== December 10 event ===
List of confirmed tornadoes – Friday, December 10, 2021 (Note: All dates are based on the local time zone where the tornado touched down; however, all times are in Coordinated Universal Time for consistency.)
| EF# | Location | County / Parish | State | Start Coord. | Time (UTC) | Path length | Max width |
|---|---|---|---|---|---|---|---|
| EF0 | SW of Emerald Mountain | Elmore | AL | 32.4364°N 86.1324°W | 22:12–22:13 | 0.19 mi (0.31 km) | 50 yd (46 m) |
| EF0 | A brief, weak tornado occurred just northeast of Montgomery and southeast of Wetumpka, causing some roof and fence damage to several homes. | | | | | | |
| EF1 | SE of Niangua | Webster, Wright | MO | 37.345°N 92.75°W | 00:13–00:23 | 6.34 mi (10.20 km) | 75 yd (69 m) |
| EF1 | Outbuildings and two barns were damaged or destroyed, and a few homes sustained minor damage. | | | | | | |
| EFU | N of Weldon to SSW of Amagon | Jackson | AR | 35.4747°N 91.2306°W | 00:15–00:23 | 6.69 mi (10.77 km) | 150 yd (140 m) |
| EFU | A tornado was caught on video over farmland; no damage was observed. This tornado was the first produced by the Quad-State supercell. | | | | | | |
| EF0 | Weiner | Poinsett | AR | 35.6067°N 90.9342°W | 00:40–00:43 | 2.97 mi (4.78 km) | 50 yd (46 m) |
| EF0 | Trees were downed in and around town, one of which fell on a house. This tornado was the second produced by the Quad-State supercell. | | | | | | |
| EF0 | NE of Wellsville | Montgomery | MO | 39.0749°N 91.5897°W | 00:55–01:00 | 4.27 mi (6.87 km) | 50 yd (46 m) |
| EF0 | A weak tornado downed trees and damaged corn crops. | | | | | | |
| EF1 | S of Jonesboro | Craighead | AR | 35.7084°N 90.7330°W | 00:57–01:01 | 6.14 mi (9.88 km) | 150 yd (140 m) |
| EF1 | A storage building was destroyed, a cotton gin was damaged, and several trees were downed. This tornado was the third produced by the Quad-State supercell. | | | | | | |
| EF0 | W of Bay | Craighead | AR | 35.7326°N 90.5971°W | 01:03–01:04 | 1.31 mi (2.11 km) | 50 yd (46 m) |
| EF0 | Trees were downed, and storage buildings sustained minor damage. This was the fourth tornado produced by the Quad-State supercell. | | | | | | |
| EF4 | N of Bay, AR to S of Hayti, MO to NE of Samburg, TN | Craighead (AR), Mississippi (AR), Dunklin (MO), Pemiscot (MO), Lake (TN), Obion (TN) | AR, MO, TN | 35.7867°N 90.5511°W | 01:07–02:36 | 81.17 mi (130.63 km) | 1,800 yd (1,600 m) |
| EF4 | 8 deaths – See article on this tornado – This was the fifth tornado, and first violent tornado produced by the Quad-State supercell. 16 people were injured. | | | | | | |
| EF1 | NW of Branson West | Stone | MO | 36.708°N 93.387°W | 01:37–01:40 | 0.62 mi (1.00 km) | 75 yd (69 m) |
| EF1 | Around 20 homes sustained roof and siding damage, and trees and power lines were downed. | | | | | | |
| EF3 | WNW of Augusta to Defiance to E of Harvester | St. Charles, St. Louis | MO | 38.598°N 90.907°W | 01:35–02:01 | 24.77 mi (39.86 km) | 150 yd (140 m) |
| EF3 | 1 death – See section on this tornado – 2 people were injured. | | | | | | |
| EF2 | SSW of Virginia to ESE of Chandlerville | Cass | IL | 39.8954°N 90.2398°W | 01:47–01:59 | 12.75 mi (20.52 km) | 200 yd (180 m) |
| EF2 | This tornado caused significant damage to a farmstead, heavily damaging a home and destroying several farm buildings. One horse was killed, and another was injured. A grain bin was destroyed, storage tanks were overturned, power poles were snapped or damaged, and trees were downed. | | | | | | |
| EF1 | NW of Merriam Woods | Taney | MO | 36.761°N 93.224°W | 01:49–01:52 | 1.57 mi (2.53 km) | 100 yd (91 m) |
| EF1 | Numerous trees were uprooted. | | | | | | |
| EF1 | Diaz | Jackson | AR | 35.6324°N 91.2636°W | 02:06–02:07 (1 minute) | 0.5 mi (0.80 km) | 80 yd (73 m) |
| EF1 | Apartment buildings were damaged in Diaz, as were structures at a nearby park. Several trees were also uprooted. | | | | | | |
| EF2 | NE of Atterberry | Menard | IL | 40.0607°N 89.9153°W | 02:07–02:16 | 4.56 mi (7.34 km) | 250 yd (230 m) |
| EF2 | A strong tornado severely damaged or destroyed several sheds and outbuildings. A house sustained significant roof damage, while many large trees were snapped or uprooted. A center pivot irrigation system was overturned. | | | | | | |
| EF2 | Northern Augusta to S of Tupelo | Woodruff, Jackson | AR | 35.3038°N 91.3689°W | 02:13–02:22 | 10.5 mi (16.9 km) | 500 yd (460 m) |
| EF2 | This high-end EF2 tornado touched down in the northern part of Augusta, where several homes suffered major structural damage and roof loss as it moved northeastward. Many trees were snapped or uprooted, and farm buildings were severely damaged. Three people were injured in this area. The tornado continued northeastward through rural farmland, destroying two farm shops and several grain bins, damaging trees, and blowing down powerlines before dissipating after crossing the county line. | | | | | | |
| EF3 | SW of Edwardsville | Madison | IL | 38.757°N 90.058°W | 02:27–02:35 | 4.22 mi (6.79 km) | 300 yd (270 m) |
| EF3 | 6 deaths – See section on this tornado – One person was injured. | | | | | | |
| EF1 | SSW of Beedeville | Jackson | AR | 35.4077°N 91.125°W | 02:30–02:31 (1 minute) | 0.5 mi (0.80 km) | 30 yd (27 m) |
| EF1 | Trees were uprooted and several travel trailers were blown over. | | | | | | |
| EF1 | W of Jonesboro | Craighead | AR | 35.822°N 90.919°W | 02:30–02:35 | 4.62 mi (7.44 km) | 75 yd (69 m) |
| EF1 | A barn was damaged and 12 utility poles were snapped northeast of Cash. | | | | | | |
| EF1 | SW of Central City | Muhlenberg | KY | 37.257°N 87.184°W | 02:32–02:37 | 2.7 mi (4.3 km) | 75 yd (69 m) |
| EF1 | Along the Western Kentucky Parkway, a metal building had some of its walls damaged and a significant portion of its roof removed. In addition, a church sustained minor structural damage, and a house had roof damage and windows blown out. Numerous trees were downed and a road sign was blown about one-tenth mile (0.16 km) as well. | | | | | | |
| EF1 | NE of Samburg | Obion | TN | 36.4192°N 89.2733°W | 02:39–02:40 (1 minute) | 0.68 mi (1.09 km) | 100 yd (91 m) |
| EF1 | Trees were uprooted. This tornado was the first of three brief tornadoes in the path break between the first EF4 tornado and the second EF4 tornado. | | | | | | |
| EF0 | W of Union City | Obion | TN | 36.4066°N 89.2241°W | 02:41–02:44 | 3.09 mi (4.97 km) | 80 yd (73 m) |
| EF0 | Trees were downed, and storage buildings were damaged. This was the second of three brief tornadoes in the path break between the first EF4 tornado and the second EF4 tornado. | | | | | | |
| EF0 | WNW of Union City | Obion | TN | 36.4430°N 89.2139°W | 02:43–02:44 (1 minute) | 0.39 mi (0.63 km) | 50 yd (46 m) |
| EF0 | Several trees were downed. This was the third of three brief tornadoes in the path break between the first EF4 tornado and the second EF4 tornado. | | | | | | |
| EF0 | E of Fisher | Poinsett | AR | 35.4845°N 90.9068°W | 02:45–02:47 | 0.5 mi (0.80 km) | 25 yd (23 m) |
| EF0 | Trees, homes, and several outbuildings were damaged. | | | | | | |
| EF4 | Woodland Mills, TN to Mayfield, KY to W of McDaniels, KY | Obion (TN), Fulton (KY), Hickman (KY), Graves (KY), Marshall (KY), Lyon (KY), Caldwell (KY), Hopkins (KY), Muhlenberg (KY), Ohio (KY), Breckinridge (KY), Grayson (KY) | TN, KY | 36.483°N 89.135°W | 02:54–05:48 | 165.6 mi (266.5 km) | 2,600 yd (2,400 m) |
| EF4 | 57 deaths – See article on this tornado – This was the ninth tornado, and second violent tornado produced by the Quad-State supercell. 515 people were injured. | | | | | | |
| EF0 | ENE of Fisher | Poinsett | AR | 35.5093°N 90.8431°W | 02:51–02:52 (1 minute) | 0.08 mi (0.13 km) | 20 yd (18 m) |
| EF0 | An outbuilding was destroyed by this brief tornado. | | | | | | |
| EF2 | S of Sorento to NW of Cowden | Bond, Montgomery, Fayette, Shelby | IL | 38.985°N 89.57°W | 02:53–03:36 | 41.54 mi (66.85 km) | 690 yd (630 m) |
| EF2 | This long-tracked tornado destroyed outbuildings, snapped, twisted, or uprooted many trees, and downed many power poles as it passed near the towns of Panama, Coffeen, Fillmore, Bingham, Ramsey, and Herrick. The most significant damage occurred near Herrick, where an addition to a house suffered heavy damage, injuring one person. | | | | | | |
| EF2 | Trumann | Poinsett | AR | 35.6654°N 90.5268°W | 03:11–03:15 | 3.6 mi (5.8 km) | 250 yd (230 m) |
| EF2 | This strong tornado was spawned by an embedded supercell within a QLCS complex moving through central and eastern Arkansas. Numerous homes, mobile homes, and businesses were damaged or destroyed in Trumann, with the most intense damage in the northeastern part of the town. A small vacant grocery store building was completely destroyed. The Trumann fire department building had its roof torn off, and a nursing home was significantly damaged, though no injuries occurred there, as the building had been evacuated prior to the tornado. Many large trees were snapped or uprooted throughout the town and an RV camper was overturned. | | | | | | |
| EF2 | SSE of Windsor to NE of Mattoon | Shelby, Moultrie, Coles | IL | 39.419°N 88.59°W | 03:50–04:04 | 15.86 mi (25.52 km) | 200 yd (180 m) |
| EF2 | A small farm outbuilding was destroyed, and power poles were broken southeast of Windsor. The tornado struck and severely damaged an agricultural services plant west of Gays, damaging or destroying several buildings and flipping three tanker trucks. A barn was destroyed, and farming equipment was tossed. A house had its roof torn off, some other homes were damaged to a lesser degree, and two large metal storage buildings were severely damaged as well. Many trees and power lines were downed along the path. | | | | | | |
| EF0 | N of Cedar Lake | Lake | IN | 41.4058°N 87.4543°W | 04:05–04:10 | 4.8 mi (7.7 km) | 100 yd (91 m) |
| EF0 | A weak tornado caused scattered light to moderate roof damage. Numerous tree limbs were snapped, and several trees and a power pole were downed. | | | | | | |
| EF2 | NE of Ellington | Reynolds | MO | 37.273°N 90.877°W | 04:05–04:11 | 6.32 mi (10.17 km) | 300 yd (270 m) |
| EF2 | A strong tornado completely unroofed two homes and destroyed the exterior wall of a third. Other homes and a single-wide trailer were damaged. Two outbuildings were destroyed, while trees and power lines were downed. | | | | | | |
| EF1 | Southern Rardin to E of Oakland | Coles | IL | 39.60°N 88.10°W | 04:18–04:22 | 6.33 mi (10.19 km) | 100 yd (91 m) |
| EF1 | This tornado touched town at the south edge of Rardin and moved to the northeast. Several trees were downed along the path. | | | | | | |
| EF3 | Northeastern Newbern, TN to Dresden, TN to W of Elkton, KY | Dyer (TN), Gibson (TN), Obion (TN), Weakley (TN), Henry (TN), Calloway (KY), Stewart (TN), Christian (KY), Todd (KY) | TN, KY | 36.12°N 89.26°W | 04:32–06:36 | 122.91 mi (197.80 km) | 2,000 yd (1,800 m) |
| EF3 | See section on this tornado – 38 people were injured. | | | | | | |
| EF2 | N of Chrisman | Edgar, Vermilion | IL | 39.8494°N 87.6693°W | 04:41–04:44 | 3.65 mi (5.87 km) | 200 yd (180 m) |
| EF2 | At a farmstead, several grain bins were damaged, and a machine shed lost large sections of its roof, with metal roofing debris scattered up to 1.5 miles (2.4 km) away. Trees were uprooted, power poles were snapped, and a barn was destroyed as well. | | | | | | |

=== December 11 event ===
List of confirmed tornadoes – Saturday, December 11, 2021
| EF# | Location | County / Parish | State | Start Coord. | Time (UTC) | Path length | Max width |
|---|---|---|---|---|---|---|---|
| EF1 | SW of Emerald Mountain | Hardin | KY | 37.7753°N 86.1383°W | 06:06–06:08 | 1.9 mi (3.1 km) | 50 yd (46 m) |
| EF1 | The walls and roofs of farm buildings were damaged, trees were snapped or uprooted, and power lines were downed. This was the tenth tornado from the Quad-State supercell. | | | | | | |
| EF0 | NW of Somerville | Fayette | TN | 35.308°N 89.463°W | 06:40–06:41 | 0.53 mi (0.85 km) | 50 yd (46 m) |
| EF0 | A brief tornado was photographed; no damage occurred. | | | | | | |
| EF3 | W of Russellville to NW of Bowling Green | Logan, Warren | KY | 36.8594°N 87.0315°W | 06:47–07:14 | 28.02 mi (45.09 km) | 1,400 yd (1,300 m) |
| EF3 | This tornado began in western Logan County after the previous long-tracked EF3 tornado dissipated approximately 12 miles (19 km) west near Elkton. It quickly intensified after touching down, tearing off the roof of a house and destroying multiple well-built dairy barns, outbuildings, and a Quonset hut at a large dairy farm. Many trees were snapped, some of which were debarked, and a semi-trailer was thrown. To the northeast, a home lost much of its second story and a nearby well-built log cabin was heavily damaged and lost its roof. The tornado then destroyed a double-wide mobile home, injuring the occupant, along with several nearby outbuildings. The tornado crossed US 431 north of Russellville and continued northeast, completely destroying many mobile homes, barns, and outbuildings and collapsing an electrical transmission tower. Several frame homes were damaged to a lesser degree, though a well-built brick home lost its roof and had a carport destroyed as well. Continuing northeast along KY 79, the tornado caused considerable damage in Chandlers Chapel, where a Methodist church lost its steeple and had several broken stained-glass windows, a school building sustained roof and window damage, and homes sustained partial to total roof loss. Further northeast, a couple of long chicken barns were leveled and swept away. Many trees and power lines were downed, and more barns, outbuildings, and homes were damaged (some heavily) as the tornado moved into Warren County. The tornado's path ended just before reaching I-165. | | | | | | |
| EF1 | SE of Mount Washington | Spencer | KY | 38.0035°N 85.4995°W | 06:51–06:53 | 1.9 mi (3.1 km) | 100 yd (91 m) |
| EF1 | The tornado struck a farm, knocking over a few silos and collapsing a barn, damaging outbuildings and downing trees. This tornado was the eleventh and last produced by the long-tracked Quad-State supercell. | | | | | | |
| EF3 | SW of Bowling Green to S of Plum Springs to NNW of Rocky Hill | Warren, Edmonson | KY | 36.916°N 86.618°W | 07:09–07:38 | 29.26 mi (47.09 km) | 440 yd (400 m) |
| EF3 | 16 deaths – See article on this tornado – 63 people were injured. | | | | | | |
| EF2 | Southeastern Bowling Green to SE of Plum Springs | Warren | KY | 36.9559°N 86.4231°W | 07:19–07:24 | 6.1 mi (9.8 km) | 300 yd (270 m) |
| EF2 | See article on this tornado | | | | | | |
| EF1 | ESE of Jackson to WSW of Lexington | Madison, Henderson | TN | 35.61°N 88.67°W | 07:32–07:40 | 7.86 mi (12.65 km) | 300 yd (270 m) |
| EF1 | One brick home sustained significant roof damage, while another had one of its garage walls blown out. A log cabin also had an exterior wall blown out, and a small and frail cottage was completely destroyed. An outbuilding and a shed were also destroyed, and another metal outbuilding was damaged. Trees were downed as well. | | | | | | |
| EF2 | WNW of Lexington to Natchez Trace State Park | Henderson | TN | 35.68°N 88.48°W | 07:40–07:58 | 15.34 mi (24.69 km) | 600 yd (550 m) |
| EF2 | This high-end EF2 tornado completely destroyed an outbuilding and multiple TVA transmission towers. A house sustained roof damage, a couple of metal buildings were heavily damaged or destroyed, and some metal power poles were bent. Numerous trees were snapped or uprooted, with minor debarking noted. One person was injured. | | | | | | |
| EF2 | SW of Park City to Cave City to NE of Horse Cave | Edmonson, Barren, Hart | KY | 37.066°N 86.088°W | 07:38–07:54 | 16.98 mi (27.33 km) | 900 yd (820 m) |
| EF2 | This tornado began in the southeast corner of Edmonson County after the Bowling Green EF3 tornado dissipated and moved northeast along I-65 into Barren County and Hart County, first passing directly through Park City, where many trees were snapped, barns and outbuildings were destroyed, and homes sustained roof damage. Past Park City, the tornado destroyed more barns, inflicted roof damage to additional homes, and heavily damaged a mobile home. The most severe damage occurred in Cave City, where hotels, motels, and restaurants in town suffered major roof loss or roof collapse, a trailer park was heavily damaged, and roads signs and metal light poles were knocked down. Homes and apartment buildings in Cave City sustained roof damage as well. In Horse Cave, the roofs of homes were damaged, and some older tobacco warehouses had their walls blown out and sustained roof damage. An office trailer in town also had its roof blown off. Many trees were downed along the path. The tornado dissipated as the parent storm merged with another storm producing a second EF2 tornado in Hart County as they passed south of Munfordville. | | | | | | |
| EF2 | SSW of Munfordville to Hardyville to NE of Summersville | Hart, Green | KY | 37.222°N 85.927°W | 07:55–08:17 | 23.82 mi (38.33 km) | 528 yd (483 m) |
| EF2 | Numerous homes, mobile homes, barns, and outbuildings were either damaged or destroyed, an Amish schoolhouse was destroyed, farm animals were killed, and many trees and power lines were downed along the beginning of this strong tornado’s. The tornado then passed through the north side of Hardyville, where several homes sustained major structural damage, garages and outbuildings were destroyed, and a truck was flipped. Past Hardyville, the tornado weakened and inflicted more minor damage to trees, roofs, and outbuildings in Summersville before the tornado dissipated. One person was injured. | | | | | | |
| EF1 | SSW of Holladay to SE of Sugar Tree | Decatur, Benton | TN | 35.819°N 88.028°W | 08:00–08:08 | 9.07 mi (14.60 km) | 100 yd (91 m) |
| EF1 | Several trees were snapped, one of which fell on and destroyed half of a mobile home. Debris from that structure was scattered into a nearby field. | | | | | | |
| EF1 | S of Ada | Hardin | OH | 40.7305°N 83.8264°W | 08:06–08:10 | 1.6 mi (2.6 km) | 150 yd (140 m) |
| EF1 | A business, a home, and nearby outbuildings sustained extensive damage. Debris from the outbuildings was blown 0.7 miles (1.1 km) away. Multiple trees were snapped. | | | | | | |
| EF2 | WNW of Lobelville to NW of Bucksnort | Perry, Humphreys, Hickman | TN | 35.7916°N 87.8868°W | 08:15–08:41 | 15.16 mi (24.40 km) | 600 yd (550 m) |
| EF2 | This strong EF2 tornado snapped and uprooted thousands of trees in a convergent pattern. An RV was overturned and had its roof torn off. Its rating was upgraded to EF2 in March 2023 after the delayed evaluation of extreme tree damage south of I-40. | | | | | | |
| EF3 | W of Saloma to W of Bradfordsville | Taylor, Marion | KY | 37.408°N 85.427°W | 08:20–08:36 | 14.54 mi (23.40 km) | 450 yd (410 m) |
| EF3 | 1 death – See section on this tornado – 36 people were injured. | | | | | | |
| EF1 | NNW of Centerville | Hickman | TN | 35.9246°N 87.6214°W | 08:32–08:39 | 8.54 mi (13.74 km) | 400 yd (370 m) |
| EF1 | Numerous trees were downed as the tornado crossed I-40. This tornado was originally rated EF0, but was upgraded to EF1 in March 2023 due to extensive tree damage in rural areas. | | | | | | |
| EF1 | SW of Gravel Switch | Marion | KY | 37.5282°N 85.1083°W | 08:41–08:43 | 1.9 mi (3.1 km) | 50 yd (46 m) |
| EF1 | This tornado formed after the EF3 Saloma tornado dissipated. One small farm building was destroyed, another sustained roof damage, and trees were downed. | | | | | | |
| EF2 | SSW of Dickson to NE of Burns | Hickman, Dickson | TN | 35.9759°N 87.4761°W | 08:40–08:51 | 10.87 mi (17.49 km) | 500 yd (460 m) |
| EF2 | A strong tornado severely damaged the roofs and exterior walls of several homes, shifting some off of their foundations. Less intense damage to trees and power poles occurred in and around Burns before tornado dissipated. Two people were injured. | | | | | | |
| EF0 | S of Burns to S of White Bluff | Dickson | TN | 36.0255°N 87.3054°W | 08:49–08:54 | 5.41 mi (8.71 km) | 175 yd (160 m) |
| EF0 | Several trees were downed and tree branches were broken off. | | | | | | |
| EF2 | E of White Bluff to NE of Pegram | Dickson, Cheatham, Davidson | TN | 36.1065°N 87.1941°W | 08:57–09:11 | 12.61 mi (20.29 km) | 400 yd (370 m) |
| EF2 | Several homes and businesses were significantly damaged along US 70 near Kingston Springs, including a few houses that sustained partial to total roof loss. Barns and outbuildings were destroyed, and trees and power poles were snapped. One person was injured. | | | | | | |
| EF2 | Eastern Junction City | Boyle | KY | 37.5792°N 84.7761°W | 09:01–09:02 | 0.63 mi (1.01 km) | 100 yd (91 m) |
| EF2 | A brief but strong tornado struck the Boyle County Airport on the east side of Junction City. Three hangars were destroyed and several aircraft were mangled. Elsewhere, several homes sustained roof damage, one home had its roof completely destroyed, and a barn was severely damaged. | | | | | | |
| EF1 | Danville | Boyle | KY | 37.6459°N 84.7908°W | 09:02–09:05 | 3.63 mi (5.84 km) | 400 yd (370 m) |
| EF1 | This tornado moved directly through Danville, where a church, a gas station, and some other businesses sustained significant roof damage, several homes sustained roof and fascia damage, and numerous trees were downed. A barn was destroyed outside of town before the tornado dissipated. | | | | | | |
| EF1 | SE of Danville to NW of Lancaster | Boyle, Lincoln, Garrard | KY | 37.603°N 84.726°W | 09:04–09:11 | 7.08 mi (11.39 km) | 100 yd (91 m) |
| EF1 | Near the community of Hedgeville, several site-built homes, manufactured homes, and barns sustained varying degrees of roof damage, and several trees were downed. One old barn was destroyed and debris was thrown onto US 27. | | | | | | |
| EF1 | SW of Bryantsville | Boyle, Garrard | KY | 37.678°N 84.694°W | 09:07–09:11 | 2.99 mi (4.81 km) | 950 yd (870 m) |
| EF1 | Numerous trees were downed, tree branches were broken, and a few roofs were damaged. | | | | | | |
| EF1 | NW of Lancaster | Garrard | KY | 37.6679°N 84.6279°W | 09:10–09:11 | 0.6 mi (0.97 km) | 100 yd (91 m) |
| EF1 | This brief tornado occurred just southeast of the path of the 09:04 UTC tornado that ended northwest of Lancaster. Two barns sustained major roof damage, a third barn was damaged, and several trees were downed. | | | | | | |
| EF0 | NE of Pegram to NNW of Downtown Nashville | Davidson | TN | 36.1819°N 86.9594°W | 09:12–09:21 | 9 mi (14 km) | 300 yd (270 m) |
| EF0 | The tornado formed just east of where the Kingston Springs EF2 dissipated. Numerous trees were blown down as the tornado crossed the Cumberland River three times, passing just north of John C. Tune Airport and through the Bordeaux neighborhood before dissipating along Whites Creek Pike (US 431). A nursery, the roof of a church, and the roofs of many homes were damaged along the path. | | | | | | |
| EF1 | NNW of Round Hill | Madison | KY | 37.687°N 84.4196°W | 09:22 | 0.25 mi (0.40 km) | 75 yd (69 m) |
| EF1 | A barn was damaged and trees were downed. | | | | | | |
| EF1 | NNW of Richmond | Madison | KY | 37.8244°N 84.3301°W | 09:31–09:32 | 1.2 mi (1.9 km) | 125 yd (114 m) |
| EF1 | A house and a tobacco barn sustained major roof damage, a second house sustained minor roof and gutter damage, and several trees were downed. | | | | | | |
| EF1 | Old Hickory to E of Hendersonville | Davidson, Sumner, Wilson | TN | 36.2635°N 86.6578°W | 09:30–09:37 | 6.82 mi (10.98 km) | 150 yd (140 m) |
| EF1 | Several homes sustained roof damage and trees were downed in Old Hickory before the tornado crossed Old Hickory Lake into Sumner County, downing numerous trees and power lines and causing roof damage to more homes. It crossed the lake again into Wilson County, downing more trees and power lines before dissipating. | | | | | | |
| EF1 | S of Hermitage to Mount Juliet | Davidson, Wilson | TN | 36.1424°N 86.5901°W | 09:31–09:39 | 7.67 mi (12.34 km) | 100 yd (91 m) |
| EF1 | This tornado moved from near Percy Priest Lake into Mount Juliet, impacting multiple subdivisions. Many homes sustained mostly minor roof and siding damage, although some homes suffered more moderate damage. One house had its east wall and garage blown out. Mount Juliet Elementary School sustained minor roof damage, and many trees were downed along the path as well. | | | | | | |
| EF0 | Hermitage | Davidson | TN | 36.1634°N 86.6223°W | 09:33–09:35 | 1.38 mi (2.22 km) | 50 yd (46 m) |
| EF0 | A tornado moved from near I-40 at J. Percy Priest Dam to near SR 45 (Old Hickory Boulevard), crossing through numerous subdivisions. Many homes sustained roof and siding damage, multiple apartment buildings sustained minor damage, and the roof of a medical building was damaged. Many trees were downed along the path as well. | | | | | | |
| EF0 | N of Gallatin to SW of Bethpage | Sumner | TN | 36.4430°N 86.4358°W | 09:42–09:48 | 6.21 mi (9.99 km) | 50 yd (46 m) |
| EF0 | An outbuilding was destroyed, a home sustained roof damage, and several trees were downed. | | | | | | |
| EF0 | N of Lebanon | Wilson, Sumner | TN | 36.3099°N 86.3301°W | 09:48–09:51 | 3.07 mi (4.94 km) | 50 yd (46 m) |
| EF0 | Several trees were downed along a path that crossed the Cumberland River twice. | | | | | | |
| EF0 | South Carthage to NW of Granville | Smith, Jackson | TN | 36.2416°N 85.9548°W | 10:04–10:11 | 7.35 mi (11.83 km) | 75 yd (69 m) |
| EF0 | This tornado started in South Carthage, causing minor roof damage, and crossed the Cumberland River into Carthage. It moved through the east side of Carthage before crossing the Cumberland River four more times. One structure sustained moderate roof damage, other buildings had minor damage, and numerous trees and tree limbs were downed. | | | | | | |
| EF1 | Hermitage Springs, TN to E of Hestand, KY | Clay (TN), Monroe (KY) | TN, KY | 36.5809°N 85.7738°W | 10:20–10:30 | 11.18 mi (17.99 km) | 75 yd (69 m) |
| EF1 | Four large agricultural buildings were destroyed in Clay County, several homes sustained roof damage, a barn was damaged near Hestand, and numerous trees were downed. | | | | | | |
| EF1 | N of Marietta | Prentiss | MS | 34.5365°N 88.4622°W | 10:30–10:35 | 4.5 mi (7.2 km) | 100 yd (91 m) |
| EF1 | A site-built home had a large part of its roof ripped off and its carport was destroyed. Two mobile homes had sections of their roofs peeled back. Numerous trees were snapped or uprooted along the path. | | | | | | |
| EF0 | S of Elkton | Giles | TN | 35.0314°N 86.9644°W | 12:17–12:22 | 4.99 mi (8.03 km) | 50 yd (46 m) |
| EF0 | A shed had its roof blown off, a house lost roof shingles, a few trees were downed, and a semi-truck was blown off I-65. | | | | | | |
| EF1 | Coalmont to N of Palmer | Grundy | TN | 35.3472°N 85.712°W | 13:39–13:48 | 8.92 mi (14.36 km) | 100 yd (91 m) |
| EF1 | The walls of a metal building were blown out and numerous trees were downed. | | | | | | |
| EF0 | S of Irwinton | Wilkinson | GA | 32.73°N 83.21°W | 22:16–22:23 | 3.8 mi (6.1 km) | 200 yd (180 m) |
| EF0 | A brief tornado downed some trees. | | | | | | |

=== December 15 event ===
List of confirmed tornadoes – Wednesday, December 15, 2021
| EF# | Location | County / Parish | State | Start Coord. | Time (UTC) | Path length | Max width |
|---|---|---|---|---|---|---|---|
| EF0 | N of Minden to SW of Gibbon | Kearney, Buffalo | NE | 40.5831°N 98.9391°W | 19:27–19:38 | 11.02 mi (17.73 km) | 150 yd (140 m) |
| EF0 | Center irrigation pivots were overturned, a couple of power poles were damaged, and the metal roof of a building at a nature preserve was peeled back; a wind gust of 83 mph (134 km/h) was measured there. | | | | | | |
| EF0 | S of Campbell to SW of Roseland | Franklin, Webster, Adams | NE | 40.2676°N 98.7285°W | 19:29–19:41 | 13.45 mi (21.65 km) | 100 yd (91 m) |
| EF0 | A building, an irrigation pivot, and some power poles were damaged in Webster County. A home suffered minor damage and several irrigation pivots were tipped over in Adams County. | | | | | | |
| EF0 | E of Lowell | Kearney, Buffalo | NE | 40.6563°N 98.8151°W | 19:33–19:41 | 7.13 mi (11.47 km) | 120 yd (110 m) |
| EF0 | A garage was destroyed, while center irrigation pivots and trees were damaged. | | | | | | |
| EF1 | WSW of Blue Hill to W of Glenvil | Webster, Adams | NE | 40.3214°N 98.5025°W | 19:44–19:56 | 14.84 mi (23.88 km) | 180 yd (160 m) |
| EF1 | Some irrigation pipe was strewn into a tree line, and trees were damaged west of Blue Hill. Several power poles were snapped southeast of Ayr. | | | | | | |
| EF1 | NNE of Juniata to S of Doniphan | Adams, Hall | NE | 40.6551°N 98.4578°W | 19:53–20:01 | 8.58 mi (13.81 km) | 150 yd (140 m) |
| EF1 | One home suffered a partial roof collapse, an outbuilding collapsed, and several irrigation pivots were overturned. | | | | | | |
| EF0 | SSW of Trumbull to SW of Giltner | Adams, Clay, Hamilton | NE | 40.6662°N 98.2789°W | 20:03–20:09 | 7.17 mi (11.54 km) | 60 yd (55 m) |
| EF0 | A horse barn and several irrigation pivots were damaged, and a tree was snapped. | | | | | | |
| EF1 | SSE of Giltner to Aurora | Hamilton | NE | 40.724°N 98.1115°W | 20:11–20:19 | 12.9 mi (20.8 km) | 400 yd (370 m) |
| EF1 | Several power poles were snapped, and numerous irrigation pivots were damaged along the path. Metal cladding was peeled off of storage buildings near the Hamilton County Fairgrounds at the south edge of Aurora. | | | | | | |
| EF1 | ESE of Marquette to N of Polk | Hamilton, Polk | NE | 40.9688°N 97.9153°W | 20:26–20:37 | 12 mi (19 km) | 400 yd (370 m) |
| EF1 | A hog facility was heavily damaged, and power poles were snapped. A large metal building was destroyed just before the tornado dissipated north of Polk. | | | | | | |
| EF1 | ESE of Polk to NW of Stromsburg | Polk | NE | 41.061°N 97.7318°W | 20:35–20:43 | 7.54 mi (12.13 km) | 350 yd (320 m) |
| EF1 | Multiple stretches of power poles were snapped, and several irrigation pivots were overturned along the path. | | | | | | |
| EF1 | Platte Center | Platte | NE | 41.53°N 97.49°W | 21:03–21:04 | 0.79 mi (1.27 km) | 30 yd (27 m) |
| EF1 | This tornado caused damage in Platte Center, where a large metal and wood-frame building collapsed, a house lost most of its roof, a garage was damaged, and trees were downed. Two sections of an irrigation pivot were tipped over outside of town. | | | | | | |
| EF2 | Columbus | Platte | NE | 41.44°N 97.38°W | 21:04–21:06 | 2.72 mi (4.38 km) | 50 yd (46 m) |
| EF2 | A house in Columbus had its attached garage and entire roof ripped off as a result of this small, but strong and fast-moving tornado. Many other homes sustained minor to moderate roof and siding damage in town. Power poles were snapped, and trees were damaged as well. Two people were injured. | | | | | | |
| EF2 | SE of Dorchester to ESE of Malcolm | Saline, Seward, Lancaster | NE | 40.62°N 97.07°W | 21:11–21:29 | 23.74 mi (38.21 km) | 70 yd (64 m) |
| EF2 | The top half of a 100-year-old barn was torn off and destroyed, and the structure itself was pulled from its rebar attachment to the foundation. Numerous irrigation pivots were overturned, and outbuildings, grain bins, power poles, and trees were damaged. | | | | | | |
| EF1 | Howells | Colfax | NE | 41.72°N 97.0°W | 21:27–21:28 | 1.5 mi (2.4 km) | 30 yd (27 m) |
| EF1 | An intermittent tornado damaged a building at a feed and seed business in Howells, caused roof damage to a house, and downed numerous trees. | | | | | | |
| EF2 | NNE of Howells | Cuming | NE | 41.77°N 96.98°W | 21:31–21:36 | 6.25 mi (10.06 km) | 100 yd (91 m) |
| EF2 | A strong tornado impacted numerous livestock barns, many of which had large sections of their roofs removed. One shed was blown 100 yards (91 m) at a farm, while two other sheds, one of which was larger and newly constructed, were demolished. Yet another shed and a house sustained minor roof and siding damage, while trees and five power poles were snapped. | | | | | | |
| EF1 | W of West Point | Cuming | NE | 41.78°N 96.81°W | 21:37–21:38 | 4.85 mi (7.81 km) | 50 yd (46 m) |
| EF1 | Power poles were snapped, and a shed was damaged. | | | | | | |
| EF1 | W of West Point | Cuming | NE | 41.82°N 96.84°W | 21:37–21:38 | 1.82 mi (2.93 km) | 50 yd (46 m) |
| EF1 | Five wooden power poles were snapped and trees were damaged. | | | | | | |
| EF1 | SSE of Beemer | Cuming | NE | 41.89°N 96.79°W | 21:41–21:42 | 0.36 mi (0.58 km) | 50 yd (46 m) |
| EF1 | A 40–60-foot (12–18 m) shed was destroyed, and a farm gravity wagon was moved about 100 yards (91 m). Trees were damaged, and a house sustained minor roof damage. | | | | | | |
| EF1 | E of Ceresco to NNW of Yutan | Saunders | NE | 41.06°N 96.56°W | 21:41–21:54 | 16.6 mi (26.7 km) | 100 yd (91 m) |
| EF1 | Several barns and outbuildings were damaged, some of which were completely destroyed. Several pivot irrigation systems was overturned, and several wooden power poles were snapped. Several buildings on the University of Nebraska Farm sustained damage. The tornado was accompanied by significant downburst winds on its eastern flank. | | | | | | |
| EF2 | ESE of Beemer to SSE of Pender | Cuming | NE | 41.91°N 96.75°W | 21:44–21:54 | 11.22 mi (18.06 km) | 200 yd (180 m) |
| EF2 | Several barns, some of which were large and well-built, were destroyed. Numerous power poles were snapped, and trees were damaged. | | | | | | |
| EF1 | N of Ithaca | Saunders | NE | 41.18°N 96.55°W | 21:46–21:47 | 0.72 mi (1.16 km) | 100 yd (91 m) |
| EF1 | Several outbuildings and a grain bin sustained major damage. A cattle feeder secured to the ground by concrete posts was ripped from its anchors and thrown 250 feet (76 m). Trees were also damaged. | | | | | | |
| EF1 | SW of Bancroft to NNW of Rosalie | Cuming, Thurston | NE | 41.98°N 96.61°W | 21:51–21:59 | 11.24 mi (18.09 km) | 20 yd (18 m) |
| EF1 | Outbuildings were damaged, shingles were ripped off the roof of a house, a windmill was collapsed, and large trees were snapped. | | | | | | |
| EF2 | W of Avoca | Otoe, Cass | NE | 40.78°N 96.16°W | 21:55–21:59 | 3.3 mi (5.3 km) | 20 yd (18 m) |
| EF2 | A large shed was destroyed, while vehicles and farm equipment sustained substantial damage, including a hay baler that was rolled into the side of an outbuilding. A tree limb was found speared into the ground. | | | | | | |
| EF1 | NW of Nebraska City | Otoe | NE | 40.75°N 95.93°W | 22:05–22:06 | 0.1 mi (0.16 km) | 200 yd (180 m) |
| EF1 | Power poles were snapped by this brief tornado. | | | | | | |
| EF1 | ENE of Summerfield | Pawnee | NE | 40.04°N 96.25°W | 22:05–22:06 | 0.18 mi (0.29 km) | 20 yd (18 m) |
| EF1 | An outbuilding was destroyed. | | | | | | |
| EF2 | NE of Nehawka | Cass | NE | 40.86°N 95.95°W | 22:06–22:09 | 3.59 mi (5.78 km) | 150 yd (140 m) |
| EF2 | A home was unroofed and moved slightly off its foundation. A roof of a garage was uplifted and displaced, and a farm outbuilding was destroyed. Power poles and trees were damaged. | | | | | | |
| EF0 | W of Du Bois | Pawnee | NE | 40.02°N 96.01°W | 22:06–22:08 | 2.18 mi (3.51 km) | 20 yd (18 m) |
| EF0 | Half of a large outbuilding was destroyed. | | | | | | |
| EF1 | E of Pawnee City | Pawnee | NE | 40.12°N 96.09°W | 22:07–22:08 | 0.8 mi (1.3 km) | 100 yd (91 m) |
| EF1 | Several outbuildings were destroyed, and a house had its wrap-around porch removed. | | | | | | |
| EF2 | E of Murray | Cass | NE | 40.92°N 95.88°W | 22:09–22:11 | 2.6 mi (4.2 km) | 200 yd (180 m) |
| EF2 | A house had its roof torn off, while another house had its extension destroyed. Trees were snapped or uprooted along the path, an irrigation pivot was flipped, a horse trailer was rolled, and one horse was killed. | | | | | | |
| EF1 | WNW of Tabor to NW of Malvern | Mills | IA | 40.92°N 95.75°W | 22:14–22:23 | 9.97 mi (16.05 km) | 100 yd (91 m) |
| EF1 | A metal outbuilding and two sheds were destroyed. Numerous houses and other outbuildings were damaged, trees were downed, and numerous power poles were snapped. | | | | | | |
| EFU | SW of Salix | Woodbury | IA | 42.288°N 96.304°W | 22:15–22:16 | 0.8 mi (1.3 km) | 20 yd (18 m) |
| EFU | A brief tornado touched down in an open field, causing no damage. | | | | | | |
| EF0 | SSW of Council Bluffs | Pottawattamie | IA | 41.19°N 95.89°W | 22:16–22:17 | 0.9 mi (1.4 km) | 30 yd (27 m) |
| EF0 | Minor tree damage occurred in an open area of the Missouri River bottom. | | | | | | |
| EF1 | E of Sergeant Bluff | Woodbury | IA | 42.366°N 96.302°W | 22:20–22:24 | 4.56 mi (7.34 km) | 75 yd (69 m) |
| EF1 | Four farmsteads were struck by the tornado, resulting in damage to several outbuildings. | | | | | | |
| EF2 | W of Weston | Pottawattamie | IA | 41.31°N 95.77°W | 22:24–22:27 | 2.3 mi (3.7 km) | 50 yd (46 m) |
| EF2 | A house had most of its roof removed, and several other homes were damaged to a lesser degree. Trees were damaged, outbuildings were destroyed, and power poles were snapped as well. | | | | | | |
| EF2 | S of Lawton to NW of Moville | Woodbury | IA | 42.429°N 96.182°W | 22:25–22:32 | 8.44 mi (13.58 km) | 100 yd (91 m) |
| EF2 | A home was unroofed, and several farmsteads sustained considerable damage from this tornado, while some other residences had shingles torn off. Two metal truss transmission towers collapsed along US 20 east of Lawton. | | | | | | |
| EF1 | S of Henderson | Mills | IA | 41.08°N 95.44°W | 22:31–22:32 | 0.63 mi (1.01 km) | 50 yd (46 m) |
| EF1 | A metal building was destroyed, with debris from the roof being scattered to the northeast. Two trucks inside were flipped, and several wooden power poles were snapped as well. | | | | | | |
| EF2 | E of Underwood to NNE of Neola | Pottawattamie | IA | 41.39°N 95.64°W | 22:31–22:36 | 6.68 mi (10.75 km) | 75 yd (69 m) |
| EF2 | One house sustained loss of its roof and had an exterior wall blown out, and a nearby garage was moved off its foundation. Large metal buildings sustained substantial damage at the southeast edge of Neola, two of which were destroyed. At least ten mature trees were uprooted as well. | | | | | | |
| EF1 | E of Macedonia to E of Oakland | Pottawattamie | IA | 41.18°N 95.36°W | 22:34–22:42 | 9.57 mi (15.40 km) | 50 yd (46 m) |
| EF1 | Trees, outbuildings, and homes were damaged along the path. | | | | | | |
| EF1 | ENE of Moville to NE of Kingsley | Woodbury, Plymouth | IA | 42.505°N 95.992°W | 22:35–22:43 | 8 mi (13 km) | 75 yd (69 m) |
| EF1 | The roof of one barn collapsed, while the roof of another was ripped off. One garage was destroyed and a second was collapsed. Trees and outbuildings were damaged at two additional farmsteads. | | | | | | |
| EF1 | WSW of Battle Creek to N of Ida Grove | Ida | IA | 42.293°N 95.667°W | 22:42–22:51 | 13 mi (21 km) | 75 yd (69 m) |
| EF1 | Several outbuildings were damaged or destroyed, a home lost shingles, power poles were snapped, and several trees were damaged. | | | | | | |
| EFU | SW of Kenwood | Crawford | IA | 41.9551°N 95.5749°W | 22:48–22:51 | 4.39 mi (7.07 km) | 50 yd (46 m) |
| EFU | A tornado was confirmed via a debris signature on radar, but caused no known damage. | | | | | | |
| EF2 | SW of Atlantic to ENE of Hamlin | Cass, Audubon | IA | 41.333°N 95.107°W | 22:49–23:09 | 27.11 mi (43.63 km) | 100 yd (91 m) |
| EF2 | Three metal truss transmission towers were blown over, while homes, outbuildings, power poles, and trees were damaged. | | | | | | |
| EF1 | NW of Galva to WSW of Alta | Ida, Cherokee, Buena Vista | IA | 42.526°N 95.435°W | 22:58–23:06 | 11.1 mi (17.9 km) | 75 yd (69 m) |
| EF1 | A home and at least four farmsteads were damaged, and numerous trees were snapped or uprooted. | | | | | | |
| EF1 | SSW of Aurelia to S of Peterson | Cherokee, Buena Vista | IA | 42.635°N 95.489°W | 22:59–23:12 | 18.1 mi (29.1 km) | 250 yd (230 m) |
| EF1 | A building at a hog farm was collapsed, resulting in the deaths of 13 hogs. The roofs and siding of homes and farm outbuildings were damaged. A grain elevator in Aurelia was damaged, several empty rail cars were overturned in town, power poles were downed, and trees were snapped. | | | | | | |
| EF1 | SSE of Brayton to NE of Exira | Cass, Audubon | IA | 41.4876°N 94.8961°W | 23:00–23:09 | 11.44 mi (18.41 km) | 80 yd (73 m) |
| EF1 | A garage was destroyed, a semi-truck was flipped, and trees were damaged. | | | | | | |
| EF1 | Larrabee to SE of Sutherland | Cherokee, O'Brien | IA | 42.858°N 95.541°W | 23:05–23:11 | 7.69 mi (12.38 km) | 100 yd (91 m) |
| EF1 | An outbuilding, machine shed, chicken barn, and four silos were destroyed. One barn, and the roof of a second barn were damaged. Trees were snapped as well. | | | | | | |
| EF1 | SW of Guthrie Center to NNE of Wichita | Guthrie | IA | 41.6206°N 94.6906°W | 23:10–23:18 | 11.45 mi (18.43 km) | 70 yd (64 m) |
| EF1 | Two farm buildings were destroyed, while houses and outbuildings were damaged as well. | | | | | | |
| EF2 | W of Breda to SW of Lytton | Carroll, Sac | IA | 42.1842°N 95.0694°W | 23:13–23:26 | 17.6 mi (28.3 km) | 100 yd (91 m) |
| EF2 | Power poles were snapped, an outbuilding was destroyed, and several other outbuildings and trees were damaged. | | | | | | |
| EF2 | SW of Wichita to NNE of Bayard | Guthrie, Greene | IA | 41.6998°N 94.7044°W | 23:14–23:28 | 19.67 mi (31.66 km) | 100 yd (91 m) |
| EF2 | The roof of a house was ripped off, and a garage and several grain bins were destroyed. Several large power poles were snapped, while trees and outbuildings were damaged. | | | | | | |
| EF2 | SE of Sioux Rapids | Buena Vista | IA | 42.834°N 95.171°W | 23:18–23:22 | 4.77 mi (7.68 km) | 100 yd (91 m) |
| EF2 | Power poles and trees were snapped along the path, and outbuildings were damaged at two farmsteads. | | | | | | |
| EF1 | NNE of Willey to E of Lidderdale | Carroll | IA | 42.0088°N 94.8095°W | 23:19–23:26 | 9.65 mi (15.53 km) | 80 yd (73 m) |
| EF1 | Homes and outbuildings were damaged along the path. | | | | | | |
| EF2 | N of Guthrie Center to W of Bagley to N of Dana | Guthrie, Greene | IA | 41.7522°N 94.4961°W | 23:21–23:42 | 29.99 mi (48.26 km) | 300 yd (270 m) |
| EF2 | Utility poles were snapped, several outbuildings were destroyed, and both trees and homes sustained damage. A semi-truck was overturned as well. | | | | | | |
| EF2 | E of Bagley to Grand Junction to NE of Dana | Guthrie, Greene | IA | 41.8432°N 94.4015°W | 23:27–23:45 | 23.4 mi (37.7 km) | 150 yd (140 m) |
| EF2 | Power poles were damaged or snapped, and an industrial windmill was toppled to the ground. A confinement building was destroyed, and houses sustained minor damage. | | | | | | |
| EF2 | SW of Jefferson | Greene | IA | 41.943°N 94.5058°W | 23:29–23:33 | 5.49 mi (8.84 km) | 100 yd (91 m) |
| EF2 | A series of high-voltage utility dual pole towers were snapped. An outbuilding was demolished and a confinement building was damaged. Additional utility poles were snapped elsewhere along the path. | | | | | | |
| EF2 | W of Jefferson | Greene | IA | 41.9863°N 94.4796°W | 23:32–23:36 | 5.83 mi (9.38 km) | 100 yd (91 m) |
| EF2 | Several large single pole utility poles were toppled. Additional high voltage poles were severely leaned over, and minor tree and house damage occurred. | | | | | | |
| EF2 | S of Churdan | Greene | IA | 42.081°N 94.4866°W | 23:34–23:36 | 2.74 mi (4.41 km) | 70 yd (64 m) |
| EF2 | Power poles were snapped along the path. | | | | | | |
| EFU | E of Lake City | Calhoun | IA | 42.2525°N 94.6317°W | 23:34–23:35 | 1.33 mi (2.14 km) | 40 yd (37 m) |
| EFU | A brief tornado was confirmed via high-resolution satellite imagery. No damage was observed. | | | | | | |
| EF1 | SSW of Lohrville to NE of Knierim | Calhoun | IA | 42.2211°N 94.583°W | 23:35–23:49 | 19.01 mi (30.59 km) | 100 yd (91 m) |
| EF1 | A tornado caused damage to trees, homes, and outbuildings. | | | | | | |
| EF1 | NE of Fostoria | Dickinson | IA | 43.265°N 95.088°W | 23:39–23:43 | 3.96 mi (6.37 km) | 50 yd (46 m) |
| EF1 | Power poles were damaged, and a house lost a portion of its roof. | | | | | | |
| EF2 | E of Grand Junction to E of Dayton | Greene, Boone, Webster | IA | 42.0405°N 94.2019°W | 23:39–23:52 | 17.69 mi (28.47 km) | 125 yd (114 m) |
| EF2 | Eight utility poles were snapped, and trees were damaged as well. | | | | | | |
| EF2 | NE of Lohrville to NNE of Barnum | Calhoun, Webster | IA | 42.2902°N 94.476°W | 23:40–23:54 | 17.97 mi (28.92 km) | 80 yd (73 m) |
| EF2 | Large utility poles were snapped, and trees and barns were damaged. Minor damage occurred to houses as well. | | | | | | |
| EF1 | NE of Ayrshire to S of Graettinger | Palo Alto | IA | 43.0586°N 94.8102°W | 23:41–23:50 | 11.16 mi (17.96 km) | 90 yd (82 m) |
| EF1 | Several trees, power poles, and the roof of an outbuilding were damaged. | | | | | | |
| EF2 | SW of Paton to NW of Lehigh | Greene, Webster | IA | 42.1489°N 94.282°W | 23:42–23:57 | 18.83 mi (30.30 km) | 150 yd (140 m) |
| EF2 | An old shed was blown apart, and a few more well-built outbuildings were destroyed too. Several large utility poles were also snapped. | | | | | | |
| EFU | SE of Palmer | Pocahontas | IA | 42.5797°N 94.5775°W | 23:43–23:44 | 1.04 mi (1.67 km) | 40 yd (37 m) |
| EFU | A tornado was confirmed using high-resolution satellite imagery. No damage was observed. | | | | | | |
| EF2 | S of Pilot Mound to NW of Stanhope | Boone, Webster, Hamilton | IA | 42.1272°N 94.0157°W | 23:49–00:01 | 16.25 mi (26.15 km) | 125 yd (114 m) |
| EF2 | Multiple large utility poles were snapped, and an outbuilding was damaged. | | | | | | |
| EFU | SW of Gilmore City to SSW of Bradgate | Pocahontas, Humboldt | IA | 42.6852°N 94.5062°W | 23:50–23:56 | 7.1 mi (11.4 km) | 80 yd (73 m) |
| EFU | A tornado was confirmed using high-resolution satellite imagery. No damage was observed. | | | | | | |
| EF2 | SSW of Stratford to W of Kamrar | Webster, Hamilton | IA | 42.2374°N 93.9463°W | 23:55–00:05 | 12.1 mi (19.5 km) | 100 yd (91 m) |
| EF2 | An outbuilding was completely destroyed, while additional outbuildings and trees were damaged. | | | | | | |
| EF1 | N of Rutland | Humboldt | IA | 42.7841°N 94.3105°W | 23:58–00:01 | 4.23 mi (6.81 km) | 80 yd (73 m) |
| EF1 | Several large utility poles were snapped by this tornado. | | | | | | |
| EF2 | W of Duncombe | Webster | IA | 42.4239°N 94.0578°W | 00:00–00:04 | 5.55 mi (8.93 km) | 80 yd (73 m) |
| EF2 | Several power poles were snapped, and an outbuilding was destroyed. | | | | | | |
| EF0 | S of Stanhope to NW of Jewell | Hamilton | IA | 42.2514°N 93.8019°W | 00:01–00:08 | 8.79 mi (14.15 km) | 70 yd (64 m) |
| EF0 | Trees and outbuildings sustained minor damage. | | | | | | |
| EF0 | ENE of Lehigh to WNW of Webster City | Webster, Hamilton | IA | 42.3813°N 93.9473°W | 00:01–00:07 | 7.63 mi (12.28 km) | 80 yd (73 m) |
| EF0 | An industrial plant sustained minor damage. | | | | | | |
| EF2 | W of Galt | Wright | IA | 42.6557°N 93.6664°W | 00:19–00:23 | 5.91 mi (9.51 km) | 70 yd (64 m) |
| EF2 | An animal confinement building and outbuildings were completely destroyed. | | | | | | |
| EF2 | N of Rowan to NW of Thornton | Wright, Franklin, Cerro Gordo | IA | 42.7555°N 93.5566°W | 00:25–00:38 | 16.69 mi (26.86 km) | 100 yd (91 m) |
| EF2 | Several farmsteads were impacted, where a few outbuildings were demolished. Trees were damaged along the path as well. | | | | | | |
| EF1 | N of Alden to NE of Bradford | Hardin, Franklin | IA | 42.5306°N 93.3697°W | 00:26–00:35 | 12.96 mi (20.86 km) | 125 yd (114 m) |
| EF1 | Tree trunks were snapped along the path of this tornado. | | | | | | |
| EF1 | SSW of Iowa Falls to W of Dumont | Hardin, Franklin | IA | 42.482°N 93.2841°W | 00:27–00:43 | 22.16 mi (35.66 km) | 140 yd (130 m) |
| EF1 | A tornado caused moderate damage to homes, trees, and outbuildings. | | | | | | |
| EF0 | E of Kanawha | Wright, Hancock | IA | 42.8998°N 93.7488°W | 00:28–00:32 | 5.23 mi (8.42 km) | 60 yd (55 m) |
| EF0 | Minor tree damage was observed along the path. | | | | | | |
| EF1 | SW of Chapin to E of Sheffield | Franklin | IA | 42.8225°N 93.2513°W | 00:38–00:43 | 6.01 mi (9.67 km) | 80 yd (73 m) |
| EF1 | An outbuilding on the property of a business was largely destroyed, and a private weather station recorded a wind gust of 108 mph (174 km/h). | | | | | | |
| EF2 | SSW of Hansell to NW of Dumont | Franklin | IA | 42.7153°N 93.114°W | 00:40–00:46 | 7.49 mi (12.05 km) | 90 yd (82 m) |
| EF2 | Extensive outbuilding damage occurred at two farmsteads, and a home had a considerable amount of roofing and siding ripped off at one of them. Trees and power poles were also damaged. | | | | | | |
| EF0 | E of Rockwell | Cerro Gordo | IA | 42.9664°N 93.1375°W | 00:44–00:46 | 2.86 mi (4.60 km) | 40 yd (37 m) |
| EF0 | Trees were damaged by this small, weak tornado. | | | | | | |
| EF1 | WNW of Scarville | Winnebago (IA), Faribault (MN) | IA, MN | 43.4643°N 93.6889°W | 00:48–00:51 | 2.85 mi (4.59 km) | 90 yd (82 m) |
| EF1 | A barn lost its roof, and several trees were downed. | | | | | | |
| EF1 | W of Greene | Butler, Floyd | IA | 42.8866°N 92.9117°W | 00:53–00:57 | 4.17 mi (6.71 km) | 100 yd (91 m) |
| EF1 | Trees were damaged along the path. | | | | | | |
| EF0 | NE of Rock Falls | Cerro Gordo | IA | 43.2076°N 93.0698°W | 00:54–00:57 | 3.54 mi (5.70 km) | 60 yd (55 m) |
| EF0 | Only minor tree damage occurred along the path of this tornado. | | | | | | |
| EF0 | WSW of Kensett to NE of Northwood | Worth | IA | 43.3432°N 93.2481°W | 00:58–01:05 | 9.11 mi (14.66 km) | 80 yd (73 m) |
| EF0 | A weak tornado damaged a few outbuildings. | | | | | | |
| EF1 | SSW of Alden | Freeborn | MN | 43.6155°N 93.6294°W | 00:58–01:01 | 3.61 mi (5.81 km) | 75 yd (69 m) |
| EF1 | Trees and utility poles were damaged along the path. | | | | | | |
| EF1 | NNE of Marble Rock to W of Charles City | Floyd | IA | 42.9847°N 92.8534°W | 00:59–01:04 | 6.7 mi (10.8 km) | 80 yd (73 m) |
| EF1 | Numerous farmsteads were struck by this tornado, where silos, sheds, barns, and outbuildings were damaged or destroyed, and a few homes were also damaged. Trees and power lines were downed as well. | | | | | | |
| EF0 | SE of Newton | Jasper | IA | 41.6317°N 93.0505°W | 01:01–01:06 | 6.27 mi (10.09 km) | 100 yd (91 m) |
| EF0 | The tornado tracked across the Newton Municipal Airport and Iowa Speedway before dissipating east of town. Several structures at the airport had minor damage. | | | | | | |
| EF1 | ENE of Alden | Freeborn | MN | 43.6725°N 93.5453°W | 01:03–01:05 | 1.64 mi (2.64 km) | 25 yd (23 m) |
| EF1 | Trees and a farm outbuilding were damaged. | | | | | | |
| EF1 | Rudd | Floyd | IA | 43.1117°N 92.925°W | 01:06–01:07 | 1.79 mi (2.88 km) | 65 yd (59 m) |
| EF1 | Power lines were toppled, trees were damaged, and some homes in town had their roofs blown off as a result of this high-end EF1 tornado. The local library also lost its roof, while a church sustained significant damage. | | | | | | |
| EF0 | SE of London, MN | Worth (IA), Freeborn (MN), Mower (MN) | IA, MN | 43.4877°N 93.0627°W | 01:09–01:12 | 2.63 mi (4.23 km) | 50 yd (46 m) |
| EF0 | An empty silo was destroyed, and trees were downed. | | | | | | |
| EF0 | SSW of Glenville | Freeborn | MN | 43.5323°N 93.3052°W | 01:10–01:13 | 2.62 mi (4.22 km) | 100 yd (91 m) |
| EF0 | Trees were downed, farm buildings were damaged, and hay bales were tossed across a road. | | | | | | |
| EF1 | SE of Glenville to NNE of Myrtle | Freeborn | MN | 43.5373°N 93.1981°W | 01:10–01:15 | 6.34 mi (10.20 km) | 100 yd (91 m) |
| EF1 | Seven outbuildings were badly damaged or destroyed at a farm. A house had multiple windows blown out, and many shingles were ripped off the roof of a second house. A machine shed had several of its support pillars ripped out of the ground. | | | | | | |
| EF1 | SSW of London to E of Myrtle | Freeborn | MN | 43.508°N 93.0741°W | 01:11–01:15 | 4.26 mi (6.86 km) | 75 yd (69 m) |
| EF1 | A machine shed was destroyed, a nearly full grain bin was dented, and a house had part of its roof ripped off. Outbuildings were damaged, two irrigation pivots were overturned, and trees were downed. | | | | | | |
| EF2 | Hartland | Freeborn | MN | 43.7976°N 93.4927°W | 01:11–01:13 | 2.17 mi (3.49 km) | 55 yd (50 m) |
| EF2 | Numerous buildings, trees, and utility poles suffered damage as a strong and fast-moving tornado moved through Hartland. The most severe damage occurred in the downtown area, where a couple of brick buildings were significantly damaged, windows were shattered, and streets were littered with debris. A light pole was broken, and a metal building had an exterior wall blown out as well. Homes in town were damaged, and a large RV camper was overturned. | | | | | | |
| EF1 | NE of Bassett | Chickasaw | IA | 43.0974°N 92.483°W | 01:15–01:18 | 3.99 mi (6.42 km) | 180 yd (160 m) |
| EF1 | Trees and farm outbuildings were damaged. | | | | | | |
| EF0 | S of Hayward to SSE of Hollandale | Freeborn | MN | 43.6113°N 93.2505°W | 01:15–01:21 | 6.71 mi (10.80 km) | 100 yd (91 m) |
| EF0 | The roofs of several outbuildings and a turkey barn were partially ripped off. A silo was dented, and trees were downed onto a number of sheds and vehicles. | | | | | | |
| EF0 | SW of Alta Vista to SE of Elma | Chickasaw, Howard | IA | 43.1713°N 92.489°W | 01:17–01:22 | 4.96 mi (7.98 km) | 50 yd (46 m) |
| EF0 | Farm equipment and trees were damaged. | | | | | | |
| EF0 | NE of Elma | Howard | IA | 43.2595°N 92.3979°W | 01:23–01:28 | 5.91 mi (9.51 km) | 45 yd (41 m) |
| EF0 | Numerous outbuildings and farms were damaged. | | | | | | |
| EF0 | W of Cresco | Howard | IA | 43.3085°N 92.2811°W | 01:29–01:32 | 4.44 mi (7.15 km) | 45 yd (41 m) |
| EF0 | Trees and several outbuildings were damaged, and the roof of a hog confinement building was ripped off. | | | | | | |
| EF0 | W of Cresco | Howard | IA | 43.3203°N 92.2087°W | 01:31–01:35 | 4.6 mi (7.4 km) | 90 yd (82 m) |
| EF0 | Falling trees largely destroyed one house and caused roof and window damage to a second. Two metal outbuildings were demolished and a third was damaged. | | | | | | |
| EF0 | N of Blooming Prairie | Steele | MN | 43.894°N 93.0592°W | 01:33–01:37 | 6.42 mi (10.33 km) | 75 yd (69 m) |
| EF0 | An irrigation system was overturned, farm outbuildings were damaged, a small shed was tossed, and trees were downed. | | | | | | |
| EF1 | SW of Hamilton to NE of Racine | Mower | MN | 43.7419°N 92.4836°W | 01:37–01:40 | 3.32 mi (5.34 km) | 85 yd (78 m) |
| EF1 | The roof of a home was blown off, and several outbuildings and tree stands were damaged. | | | | | | |
| EF0 | N of Spring Valley to SE of Pleasant Grove | Fillmore | MN | 43.7762°N 92.37°W | 01:42–01:46 | 4.6 mi (7.4 km) | 80 yd (73 m) |
| EF0 | Several sheds, outbuildings and trees were damaged. | | | | | | |
| EF0 | Preston | Fillmore | MN | 43.6699°N 92.0805°W | 01:48–01:49 | 0.51 mi (0.82 km) | 40 yd (37 m) |
| EF0 | Cars and sheds were damaged, the city hall and a fire department building in town sustained roof damage, and numerous trees were snapped. | | | | | | |
| EF1 | NE of Preston | Fillmore | MN | 43.6878°N 92.0736°W | 01:51–01:53 | 1.77 mi (2.85 km) | 75 yd (69 m) |
| EF1 | Extensive damage occurred to farm buildings, and numerous trees were damaged. | | | | | | |
| EF1 | N of West Concord to W of Roscoe | Dodge, Goodhue | MN | 44.1934°N 92.9007°W | 01:50–01:54 | 4.33 mi (6.97 km) | 75 yd (69 m) |
| EF1 | The top half of a barn was destroyed, and pine trees were snapped. | | | | | | |
| EF1 | SE of Kenyon | Goodhue | MN | 44.2085°N 92.9385°W | 01:51–01:55 | 4.39 mi (7.07 km) | 75 yd (69 m) |
| EF1 | Farm buildings were destroyed, and several trees were snapped. | | | | | | |
| EF1 | E of Arendahl | Fillmore | MN | 43.8184°N 91.9031°W | 02:01–02:02 | 1.19 mi (1.92 km) | 250 yd (230 m) |
| EF1 | A grove of trees was damaged by this tornado. | | | | | | |
| EF1 | S of Rushford | Fillmore | MN | 43.7464°N 91.7757°W | 02:02–02:04 | 2.35 mi (3.78 km) | 75 yd (69 m) |
| EF1 | Trees and some farm outbuildings were damaged. | | | | | | |
| EF1 | E of Plainview | Wabasha | MN | 44.1342°N 92.1343°W | 02:03–02:07 | 4.03 mi (6.49 km) | 40 yd (37 m) |
| EF1 | Numerous trees and several farm buildings were damaged. | | | | | | |
| EF1 | NW of Houston | Houston | MN | 43.7582°N 91.6525°W | 02:06–02:11 | 7.31 mi (11.76 km) | 250 yd (230 m) |
| EF1 | Numerous tree stands and farm outbuildings were damaged, and shingles were ripped off of a house. | | | | | | |
| EF0 | N of Wyattville | Winona | MN | 43.9605°N 91.7908°W | 02:10–02:11 | 0.63 mi (1.01 km) | 40 yd (37 m) |
| EF0 | Several outbuildings, a garage, and trees were damaged. | | | | | | |
| EF1 | Homer, MN | Winona (MN), Trempealeau (WI) | MN, WI | 43.9965°N 91.58°W | 02:17–02:21 | 4.85 mi (7.81 km) | 40 yd (37 m) |
| EF1 | This tornado struck Homer, where tree damage occurred. A few outbuildings and trees were damaged elsewhere. | | | | | | |
| EF0 | Trempealeau | Trempealeau | WI | 44.0059°N 91.4558°W | 02:23–02:24 | 0.74 mi (1.19 km) | 25 yd (23 m) |
| EF0 | Homes, outbuildings, trees, and crops sustained minor damage in and around Trempealeau. | | | | | | |
| EF1 | W of Levis | Trempealeau, Jackson | WI | 44.4995°N 91.1829°W | 02:53–02:55 | 2.68 mi (4.31 km) | 70 yd (64 m) |
| EF1 | Outbuildings, trees, and one home were damaged. | | | | | | |
| EF0 | W of Fairchild to E of Augusta | Eau Claire | WI | 44.6017°N 91.0761°W | 03:00–03:06 | 6.71 mi (10.80 km) | 75 yd (69 m) |
| EF0 | Two sheds suffered partial roof loss, and numerous trees were downed, some of which fell on sheds, homes, and vehicles. | | | | | | |
| EF0 | E of Chippewa Falls | Chippewa | WI | 44.9012°N 91.3039°W | 03:02–03:07 | 5.35 mi (8.61 km) | 75 yd (69 m) |
| EF0 | The tornado moved along the east side of Lake Wissota, near Bateman, downing hundreds of trees. Some homes were damaged by falling trees, while others sustained shingle and soffit removal. | | | | | | |
| EF2 | SW of Hewett | Jackson, Clark | WI | 44.5039°N 90.804°W | 03:05–03:08 | 3.13 mi (5.04 km) | 250 yd (230 m) |
| EF2 | This strong tornado moved through a large forested area, snapping hundreds of trees in a convergent pattern before it was overcome by downburst winds. | | | | | | |
| EF2 | W of Neillsville | Clark | WI | 44.5110°N 90.7491°W | 03:07–03:09 | 2.8 mi (4.5 km) | 250 yd (230 m) |
| EF2 | A small, poorly anchored house was swept off its foundation, and trees and power lines were downed. | | | | | | |
| EF2 | SE of Boyd to NE of Stanley | Chippewa, Clark | WI | 44.901°N 90.9834°W | 03:16–03:23 | 7.41 mi (11.93 km) | 50 yd (46 m) |
| EF2 | This tornado initially caused minor tree, roof, and outbuilding damage before it intensified and moved directly through Stanley. Many homes were damaged in town, some severely with roofs and exterior walls ripped off. Garages and metal buildings were completely destroyed, and a large metal trailer was lofted and thrown 250 yards (230 m). Many trees were snapped, power lines were downed, a couple of older brick buildings sustained some collapse of exterior walls, and a few businesses had windows blown out and roofing torn off. Past Stanley, the tornado caused damage to outbuildings and tree limbs outside of town before dissipating. | | | | | | |
| EF2 | NNE of Neillsville | Clark | WI | 44.5975°N 90.5799°W | 03:16–03:18 | 1.13 mi (1.82 km) | 50 yd (46 m) |
| EF2 | A brief but strong tornado struck a farm, where a house had much of its roof ripped off, windows were broken, and a barn was shifted off of its foundation. A truck on the property was tossed nearly 100 feet (30 m) away from where it originated. Trees were downed as well. | | | | | | |
| EF1 | W of Greenwood | Clark | WI | 44.7667°N 90.6642°W | 03:22–03:23 | 0.9 mi (1.4 km) | 50 yd (46 m) |
| EF1 | A pole shed was destroyed, a power pole was snapped, and trees were damaged. One barn had its roof ripped off while a second sustained roof damage. | | | | | | |

=== December 18 event ===
List of confirmed tornadoes – Saturday, December 18, 2021
| EF# | Location | County / Parish | State | Start Coord. | Time (UTC) | Path length | Max width |
|---|---|---|---|---|---|---|---|
| EF1 | NE of Cut and Shoot | Montgomery | TX | 30.388°N 95.3073°W | 16:47–16:52 | 1.57 mi (2.53 km) | 100 yd (91 m) |
| EF1 | Numerous large trees were uprooted and smaller trees were snapped. | | | | | | |

=== December 21 event ===
List of confirmed tornadoes – Tuesday, December 21, 2021
| EF# | Location | County / Parish | State | Start Coord. | Time (UTC) | Path length | Max width |
|---|---|---|---|---|---|---|---|
| EF1 | S of Fort Myers | Lee | FL | 26.5125°N 81.8421°W | 11:25–11:27 | 1.29 mi (2.08 km) | 50 yd (46 m) |
| EF1 | Numerous trees were downed, and dozens of houses sustained roof damage. Vehicles and swimming pool enclosures were damaged as well. One person was injured by broken glass. Damaging winds caused additional damage to the northeast after the tornado dissipated. | | | | | | |

=== December 29 event ===
List of confirmed tornadoes – Wednesday, December 29, 2021
| EF# | Location | County / Parish | State | Start Coord. | Time (UTC) | Path length | Max width |
|---|---|---|---|---|---|---|---|
| EF0 | Bainbridge | Decatur | GA | 30.9019°N 84.5761°W | 20:07–20:08 | 0.95 mi (1.53 km) | 50 yd (46 m) |
| EF0 | A small apartment building sustained minor damage, the roof of a store was peeled back, a home sustained minor roof damage, and a metal carport was damaged. A few trees and tree branches were knocked down, and a road sign was downed as well. | | | | | | |
| EF1 | NE of Sulligent to E of Winfield | Lamar, Marion | AL | 33.9167°N 88.0816°W | 00:27–00:47 | 17.53 mi (28.21 km) | 300 yd (270 m) |
| EF1 | The tornado touched down southwest of Beaverton and moved almost due east into Marion County. It downed trees sporadically and damaged a small barn in Lamar County before exiting. It straddled the Marion–Fayette county line, although the tornado never entirely entered Fayette County. More trees were downed as the tornado approached Winfield, where it strengthened to high-end EF1 intensity. In downtown Winfield, numerous homes and businesses were damaged. Several businesses sustained roof and structural damage, with windows being blown out of others, and a strip mall lost a large section of its roof. East of downtown, the tornado narrowed and weakened, with several homes sustaining minor roof damage and more trees being downed before it dissipated. | | | | | | |
| EF1 | SW of Powell to NNE of Rainsville | DeKalb | AL | 34.5167°N 85.9429°W | 02:21–02:29 | 6.03 mi (9.70 km) | 285 yd (261 m) |
| EF1 | Several houses sustained minor roof damage, the BlueScope Steel building in Rainsville sustained roof damage, and a small outbuilding and a couple carports were destroyed. Numerous trees and several power lines were downed as well. | | | | | | |
| EF0 | N of Glencoe | Etowah | AL | 33.9681°N 85.9351°W | 03:02–03:04 | 1.2 mi (1.9 km) | 100 yd (91 m) |
| EF0 | The roof of a barn was peeled back, a shed was destroyed, and a travel trailer was moved. A house sustained minor roof damage, and trees were downed. | | | | | | |
| EF0 | S of Folsom | Bartow | GA | 34.3433°N 84.8541°W | 03:52–03:55 | 1.93 mi (3.11 km) | 100 yd (91 m) |
| EF0 | Numerous trees were snapped or uprooted. | | | | | | |
| EF1 | NNW of Jemison to SSE of Shelby | Chilton, Shelby | AL | 33.0444°N 86.7754°W | 04:01–04:19 | 10.93 mi (17.59 km) | 400 yd (370 m) |
| EF1 | At least four structures were damaged, and many trees were downed by this high-end EF1 tornado. The tornado just crossed into Shelby County before lifting. | | | | | | |

=== December 30 event ===
List of confirmed tornadoes – Thursday, December 30, 2021
| EF# | Location | County / Parish | State | Start Coord. | Time (UTC) | Path length | Max width |
|---|---|---|---|---|---|---|---|
| EF0 | SW of Flowery Branch | Hall | GA | 34.1760°N 83.9808°W | 05:03–05:07 | 2 mi (3.2 km) | 75 yd (69 m) |
| EF0 | This weak tornado downed numerous trees along its path, with one falling on a two-car garage. | | | | | | |
| EF1 | N of Canton | Cherokee | GA | 34.3022°N 84.4754°W | 05:19–05:21 | 0.48 mi (0.77 km) | 100 yd (91 m) |
| EF1 | A large bedroom window was blown in on a home, a large fence on a tennis court was blown down, and a large trampoline was thrown approximately 150 yards (140 m) into a neighboring house. Hundreds of trees were downed in a wooded area; a small barn and an RV were destroyed by numerous falling trees, and a nearby house had a tree fall on it as well. | | | | | | |
| EF1 | SE of Moultrie | Colquitt | GA | 31.1087°N 83.7293°W | 20:16–20:24 | 3.82 mi (6.15 km) | 150 yd (140 m) |
| EF1 | Several homes and other buildings sustained roof and siding damage south of Spence Airport. Several small outbuildings were destroyed, a camper was rolled over, and several trees were downed as well. | | | | | | |
| EF1 | E of Sparks | Cook | GA | 31.1703°N 83.3804°W | 21:03–21:15 | 2.19 mi (3.52 km) | 150 yd (140 m) |
| EF1 | Several outbuildings were destroyed, several homes and other outbuildings sustained roof damage, and numerous trees were downed. | | | | | | |
| EF1 | SSW of Denton to SSW of Graham | Jeff Davis, Appling | GA | 31.69°N 82.73°W | 21:33–21:55 | 11.89 mi (19.14 km) | 300 yd (270 m) |
| EF1 | The roof of a farmhouse was lifted off, several other homes sustained roof damage, and large trees were snapped or uprooted. | | | | | | |
| EF0 | S of Hawkinsville | Pulaski | GA | 32.23°N 83.59°W | 23:09–23:32 | 10.1 mi (16.3 km) | 200 yd (180 m) |
| EF0 | An open barn was destroyed, as was a covered awning. Several homes sustained minor damage, including to roofs, gutters, siding, and a front porch awning. Several trees were downed along the path. | | | | | | |

=== December 31 event ===
List of confirmed tornadoes – Friday, December 31, 2021
| EF# | Location | County / Parish | State | Start Coord. | Time (UTC) | Path length | Max width |
|---|---|---|---|---|---|---|---|
| EF1 | SSW of Loveless | DeKalb | AL | 34.2875°N 85.7878°W | 20:49–20:52 | 0.95 mi (1.53 km) | 50 yd (46 m) |
| EF1 | A tornado impacted a mobile home park, flipping one structure and damaging the roofs of several others. The roof of a chicken house was damaged as well. Trees were snapped and uprooted. | | | | | | |
| EF1 | ENE of Temple | Carroll | GA | 33.7372°N 84.9998°W | 22:32–22:45 | 2.75 mi (4.43 km) | 150 yd (140 m) |
| EF1 | A barn was destroyed, a carport was detached from a manufactured home, and a shed was rolled about 20 feet (6.1 m) against the side of a house. Numerous trees were downed, one of which fell on a house and damaged the roof. | | | | | | |
| EF1 | WSW of Covington | Newton | GA | 33.5676°N 83.9877°W | 22:39–22:46 | 2.5 mi (4.0 km) | 75 yd (69 m) |
| EF1 | A middle school sustained significant loss of siding and roofing from the main building and the gymnasium, and at least twelve homes sustained mostly minor roof damage. A Chick-fil-A was damaged, a Publix sustained minor roof damage, and vehicles were tossed and flipped. Numerous trees were snapped or uprooted. Six people suffered minor injuries near the Chick-fil-A. | | | | | | |

== See also ==
- Tornadoes of 2021
- List of United States tornadoes from October to November 2021
- List of United States tornadoes from January to March 2022
