= Meservey, Iowa =

- City
- Location of Meservey, Iowa
- Coordinates: 42°54′56″N 93°28′24″W
- Country: USA
- State: Iowa
- County: Cerro Gordo
- Incorporated: August 24, 1893

Area
  - Total: 1.49 sq mi (3.87 km^{2})
  - Land: 1.49 sq mi (3.87 km^{2})
  - Water: 0 sq mi (0.00 km^{2})
- Elevation: 1,253 ft (382 m)

Population (2020)
  - Total: 222
  - Density: 148/sq mi (57.3/km^{2})
- Time zone: UTC-6 (Central (CST))
  - Summer (DST): UTC-5 (CDT)
- ZIP code: 50457
- Area code: 641
- FIPS code: 19-51420
- GNIS feature ID: 2395104
- Website: cityofmeservey.com

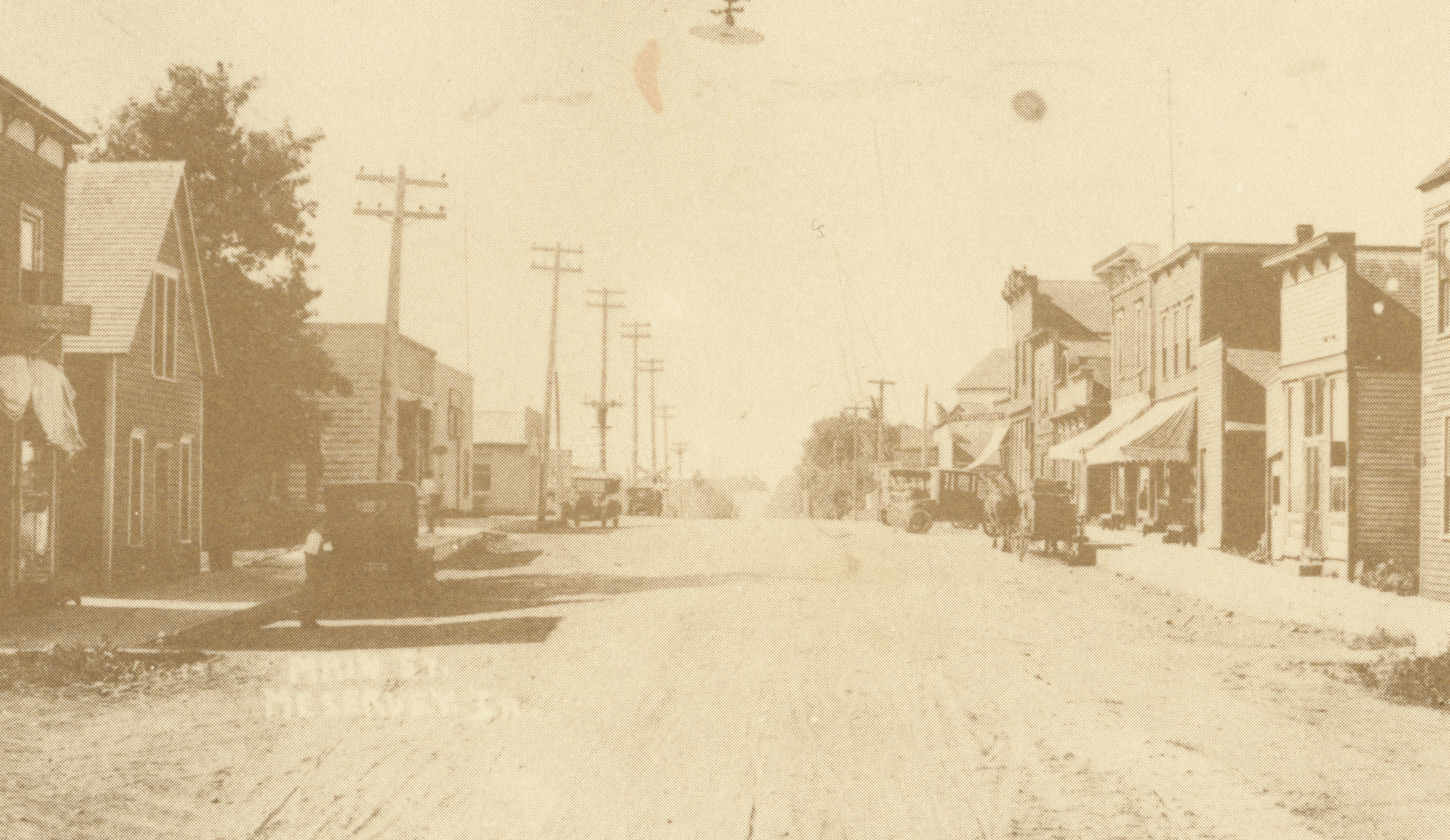
Main Street, Meservey, Iowa

Meservey is a city in Cerro Gordo County, Iowa, United States. The population was 222 at the time of the 2020 census. It is part of the Mason City Micropolitan Statistical Area.

== History ==
Meservey was founded in 1886, shortly after a railroad line was built connecting Mason City and Fort Dodge. It takes its name from the Meservey brothers, who were railroad employees at this time. The western portion of town was originally known as Kausville, and eventually merged into Meservey, and is still legally known as the "Kausville Addition".

== Geography ==
According to the United States Census Bureau, the city has a total area of 1.51 square miles (3.91 km^{2}), all land.

== Demographics ==
Historical populations
Year	Pop.	±%
1900	193	—
1910	193	+0.0%
1920	282	+46.1%
1930	255	−9.6%
1940	282	+10.6%
1950	297	+5.3%
1960	331	+11.4%
1970	354	+6.9%
1980	324	−8.5%
1990	292	−9.9%
2000	252	−13.7%
2010	256	+1.6%
2020	222	−13.3%
Source:"U.S. Census website". United States Census Bureau. and Iowa Data Center; Source: U.S. Decennial Census

=== 2020 census ===
As of the census of 2020, there were 222 people, 105 households, and 68 families residing in the city. The population density was 148.4 inhabitants per square mile (57.3/km^{2}). There were 125 housing units at an average density of 83.6 per square mile (32.3/km^{2}). The racial makeup of the city was 85.6% White, 0.9% Black or African American, 0.0% Native American, 0.0% Asian, 0.0% Pacific Islander, 2.7% from other races and 10.8% from two or more races. Hispanic or Latino persons of any race comprised 10.8% of the population.

Of the 105 households, 29.5% of which had children under the age of 18 living with them, 47.6% were married couples living together, 7.6% were cohabitating couples, 25.7% had a female householder with no spouse or partner present and 19.0% had a male householder with no spouse or partner present. 35.2% of all households were non-families. 28.6% of all households were made up of individuals, 10.5% had someone living alone who was 65 years old or older.

The median age in the city was 44.5 years. 21.6% of the residents were under the age of 20; 3.6% were between the ages of 20 and 24; 25.2% were from 25 and 44; 23.0% were from 45 and 64; and 26.6% were 65 years of age or older. The gender makeup of the city was 49.5% male and 50.5% female.

=== 2010 census ===
As of the census of 2010, there were 256 people, 122 households, and 68 families residing in the city. The population density was 169.5 inhabitants per square mile (65.4/km^{2}). There were 139 housing units at an average density of 92.1 per square mile (35.6/km^{2}). The racial makeup of the city was 99.2% White and 0.8% from two or more races. Hispanic or Latino of any race were 3.1% of the population.

There were 122 households, of which 19.7% had children under the age of 18 living with them, 44.3% were married couples living together, 8.2% had a female householder with no husband present, 3.3% had a male householder with no wife present, and 44.3% were non-families. 35.2% of all households were made up of individuals, and 21.4% had someone living alone who was 65 years of age or older. The average household size was 2.10 and the average family size was 2.69.

The median age in the city was 46.3 years. 17.2% of residents were under the age of 18; 10.5% were between the ages of 18 and 24; 20% were from 25 to 44; 26.6% were from 45 to 64; and 25.8% were 65 years of age or older. The gender makeup of the city was 50.4% male and 49.6% female.

=== 2000 census ===
As of the census of 2000, there were 252 people, 123 households, and 75 families residing in the city. The population density was 166.9 inhabitants per square mile (64.4/km^{2}). There were 137 housing units at an average density of 90.8 per square mile (35.1/km^{2}). The racial makeup of the city was 98.81% White, 0.40% from other races, and 0.79% from two or more races. Hispanic or Latino of any race were 3.97% of the population.

There were 123 households, out of which 21.1% had children under the age of 18 living with them, 52.0% were married couples living together, 8.1% had a female householder with no husband present, and 39.0% were non-families. 34.1% of all households were made up of individuals, and 20.3% had someone living alone who was 65 years of age or older. The average household size was 2.05 and the average family size was 2.60.

In the city, the population was spread out, with 16.7% under the age of 18, 7.5% from 18 to 24, 21.8% from 25 to 44, 26.6% from 45 to 64, and 27.4% who were 65 years of age or older. The median age was 48 years. For every 100 females, there were 93.8 males. For every 100 females age 18 and over, there were 89.2 males.

The median income for a household in the city was $32,500, and the median income for a family was $36,042. Males had a median income of $28,438 versus $16,406 for females. The per capita income for the city was $16,043. About 7.2% of families and 8.9% of the population were below the poverty line, including 20.0% of those under the age of eighteen and none of those 65 or over.

== Schools ==
Meservey is part of the West Fork Community School District, formed in 2011 by the merger of the Sheffield–Chapin–Meservey–Thornton (SCMT) Community School District and the Rockwell–Swaledale Community School District. Meservey became a part of the West Fork whole grade-sharing school system, prior to the official merging of districts, as of the 2008–09 school year. SCMT was formed in 2007 by the merger of the Meservey–Thornton Community School District and the Sheffield–Chapin Community School District. Prior to this, Meservey-Thornton had formed in 1963 from the merger of the Meservey Consolidated School District and the Thornton Consolidated School District.

=== Meservey School ===
The Consolidated Independent School District of Meservey, Iowa, was seeking a builder for its school in the 1920s.

The Meservey school building was built in the 1940s (as a Works Progress Administration project) as a K–12 facility for Meservey High School. In 1963, it became an elementary and junior high school for the combined Meservey–Thornton school district. At a later time it became elementary school only as junior high classes were moved to Thornton. Due to declining enrollments, the building was closed in 1983, when all K–12 classes met in the Thornton facility. In 1988, Meservey–Thornton began whole-grade sharing with Sheffield–Chapin school district. The Meservey school facility was razed sometime around 1993, and the property is now Schoolhouse Park.

Meservey High School's mascot was the Rockets. The Meservey–Thornton mascot was the "Lancers". When the high school classes moved to Sheffield in 1988, the Lancer mascot was retained for the middle-school sports teams. However, with further consolidation in 2007, the Lancer mascot was officially retired with a parade in Thornton in July 2007.

Due to continued declining enrollment, the former S-C, M-T, and neighboring Rockwell–Swaledale school districts entered into a grade-sharing agreement to form the West Fork school partnership in 2008, with the "Warhawks" as the new mascot. All students now attend Sheffield and Rockwell. Each remaining school will have K–3, Rockwell will house 4–8 and Sheffield 9–12. The districts legally merged in 2011.
