= West Fork Community School District =

Public school district in Rockwell, Iowa, United States

Coordinates: 42.983362°N 93.191598°W

Location
- Rockwell, Iowa Cerro Gordo, Franklin, Hancock, and Wright counties United States
- Coordinates: 42.983362, -93.191598

District information
- Type: Local school district
- Grades: K–12
- Established: 2011; 15 years ago
- Superintendent: Mike Kruger
- Schools: 4
- Budget: $11,672,000 (2020-21)
- NCES District ID: 1925920

Students and staff
- Students: 776 (2022-23)
- Teachers: 56.93 FTE
- Staff: 72.66 FTE
- Student–teacher ratio: 13.63
- Athletic conference: Top of Iowa
- District mascot: Warhawks
- Colors: Black and Red

Other information
- Website: www.westforkschool.org

The West Fork Community School District is a consolidated rural public school district in Iowa, with campuses in Rockwell and Sheffield. It resides in sections of Cerro Gordo and Franklin counties, with smaller portions in Hancock and Wright counties. The district is for students residing in the communities of Rockwell, Sheffield, Swaledale, Meservey, Thornton, Dougherty, and Chapin.

The district is about 300 square miles (780 km^{2}) large.

== History ==
It was established on July 1, 2011, by the merger of the Sheffield–Chapin–Meservey–Thornton (SCMT) Community School District and the Rockwell–Swaledale Community School District.

Three predecessor districts, Rockwell–Swaledale, Sheffield–Chapin Community School District, and Meservey–Thornton Community School District, established a joint whole grade-sharing agreement, in which from one school district attend another district's schools for certain levels, at the high school level in 2004. Sheffield–Chapin and Meservey–Thornton, which already had their own whole grade-sharing agreement, legally merged into the single SCMT district in 2007. The Rockwell–Swaledale and SCMT districts established a new whole-grade sharing agreement, under the name "West Fork", in 2008. The district website described July 1, 2008, the time of establishment of the grade-sharing, as the date of its founding, although it was not legally in existence as a single school district at that point.

In 2010, voters of the two districts formally agreed to merge, with Rockwell–Swaledale district residents approving it on a 253–201 basis, or 55%, while SCMT voters approved on a 501–42 basis, or 92.27%.

== Schools ==
Schools include:

- West Fork Elementary at Rockwell - Grades Pre-Kindergarten Through 5
- West Fork Middle School, Sheffield
- West Fork High School, Sheffield

A previous school configuration was having West Fork Elementary - Sheffield serving Pre-Kindergarten through Grade 2, West Fork Rockwell Campus serving PreK through Grade 8, and West Fork High School in a building separate from the elementary.

=== West Fork High School ===
==== Athletics ====
Their mascot is a Warhawk. The school's athletic teams play in the Top of Iowa Conference, after the merger of the Corn Bowl Conference, their former conference, and the North Iowa Conference. The teams were formerly known as the RS Rebels and the SCMT Spartans.

- Football
- Cross Country
- Volleyball
- Basketball
  - Boys' 2011 Class 2A State Champions
- Wrestling
- Golf
- Track and Field
- Baseball
- Softball
- Archery
  - 2021 Elementary 3-D State, Nationals, World Champions
  - 2021 Elementary Bullseye State Champion, Nationals Runner-Up

== See also ==
- List of school districts in Iowa
- List of high schools in Iowa
