= Thornton, Iowa =

- City
- Location of Thornton, Iowa
- Coordinates: 42°56′39″N 93°22′53″W
- Country: USA
- State: Iowa
- County: Cerro Gordo
- Incorporated: August 22, 1892

Area
  - Total: 1.24 sq mi (3.22 km^{2})
  - Land: 1.24 sq mi (3.22 km^{2})
  - Water: 0 sq mi (0.00 km^{2})
- Elevation: 1,191 ft (363 m)

Population (2020)
  - Total: 400
  - Density: 321.6/sq mi (124.18/km^{2})
- Time zone: UTC-6 (Central (CST))
  - Summer (DST): UTC-5 (CDT)
- ZIP code: 50479
- Area code: 641
- FIPS code: 19-77880
- GNIS feature ID: 2397021
- Website: www.cityofthorntonia.com

Thornton is a city in Cerro Gordo County, Iowa, United States. The population was 400 at the time of the 2020 census. It is part of the Mason City Micropolitan Statistical Area.

== Geography ==
Thornton, Iowa is located at 42°56′42″N 93°23′3″W (42.944972, -93.384115).

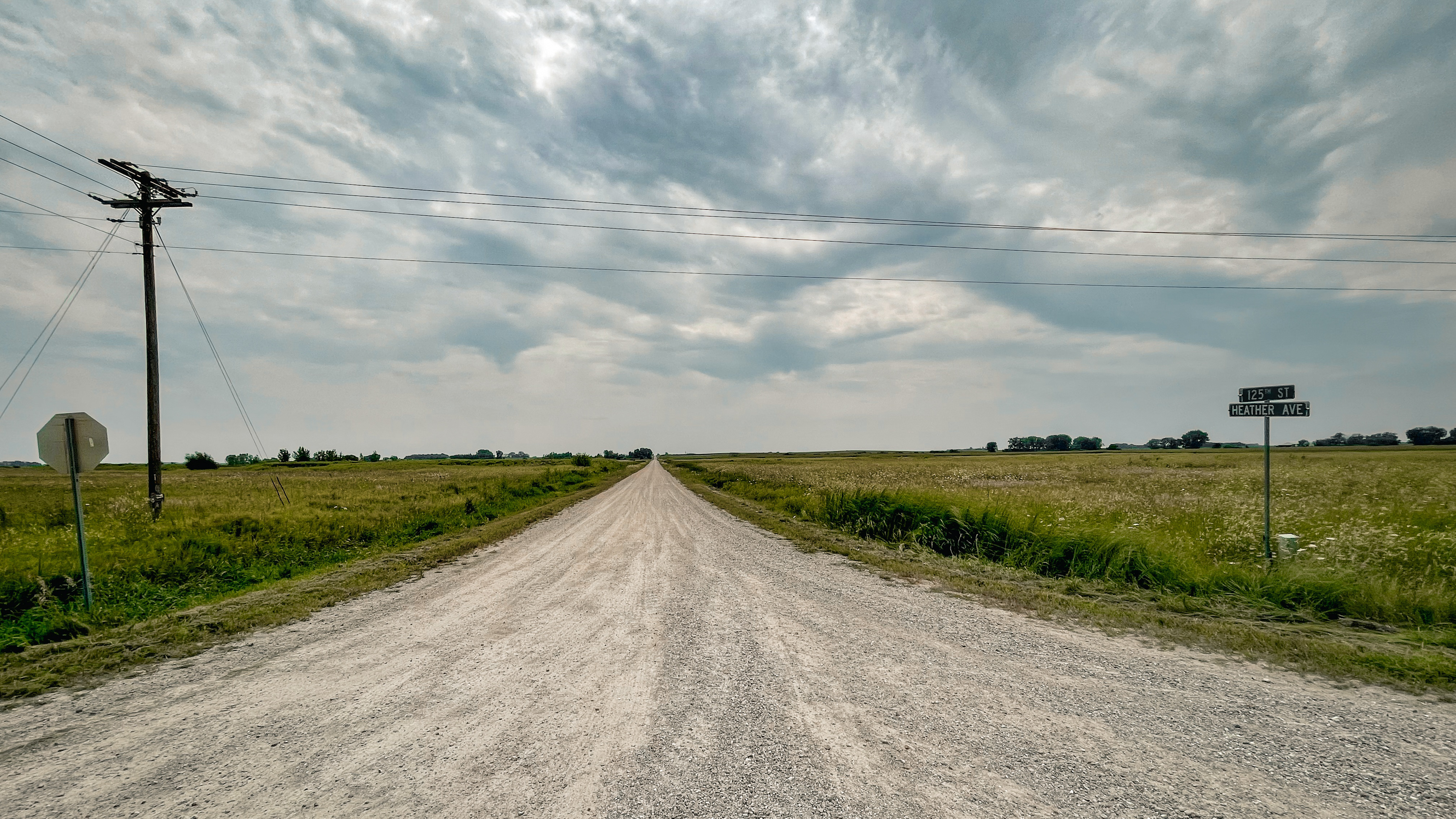
A road in Thornton in 2024

According to the United States Census Bureau, the city has a total area of 1.25 square miles (3.24 km^{2}), all land.

== Demographics ==
Historical populations
| Year | Pop. | ±% |
|---|---|---|
| 1900 | 299 | — |
| 1910 | 271 | −9.4% |
| 1920 | 317 | +17.0% |
| 1930 | 383 | +20.8% |
| 1940 | 398 | +3.9% |
| 1950 | 441 | +10.8% |
| 1960 | 449 | +1.8% |
| 1970 | 410 | −8.7% |
| 1980 | 442 | +7.8% |
| 1990 | 431 | −2.5% |
| 2000 | 422 | −2.1% |
| 2010 | 422 | +0.0% |
| 2020 | 400 | −5.2% |
Source:"U.S. Census website". United States Census Bureau. and Iowa Data Center; Source: U.S. Decennial Census

=== 2020 census ===
As of the census of 2020, there were 400 people, 185 households, and 119 families residing in the city. The population density was 321.6 inhabitants per square mile (124.2/km^{2}). There were 205 housing units at an average density of 164.8 per square mile (63.6/km^{2}). The racial makeup of the city was 95.2% White, 0.5% Black or African American, 0.0% Native American, 0.0% Asian, 0.0% Pacific Islander, 0.5% from other races and 3.8% from two or more races. Hispanic or Latino persons of any race comprised 2.8% of the population.

Of the 185 households, 28.1% of which had children under the age of 18 living with them, 49.7% were married couples living together, 11.4% were cohabitating couples, 15.1% had a female householder with no spouse or partner present and 23.8% had a male householder with no spouse or partner present. 35.7% of all households were non-families. 27.0% of all households were made up of individuals, 11.4% had someone living alone who was 65 years old or older.

The median age in the city was 38.0 years. 22.0% of the residents were under the age of 20; 8.2% were between the ages of 20 and 24; 27.8% were from 25 and 44; 22.8% were from 45 and 64; and 19.2% were 65 years of age or older. The gender makeup of the city was 50.2% male and 49.8% female.

=== 2010 census ===
As of the census of 2010, there were 422 people, 188 households, and 125 families residing in the city. The population density was 337.6 inhabitants per square mile (130.3/km^{2}). There were 204 housing units at an average density of 163.2 per square mile (63.0/km^{2}). The racial makeup of the city was 98.6% White, 0.5% African American, and 0.9% from two or more races. Hispanic or Latino of any race were 0.7% of the population.

There were 188 households, of which 27.7% had children under the age of 18 living with them, 56.4% were married couples living together, 6.9% had a female householder with no husband present, 3.2% had a male householder with no wife present, and 33.5% were non-families. 28.7% of all households were made up of individuals, and 13.3% had someone living alone who was 65 years of age or older. The average household size was 2.24 and the average family size was 2.72.

The median age in the city was 45.3 years. 20.4% of residents were under the age of 18; 9.2% were between the ages of 18 and 24; 20% were from 25 to 44; 30.1% were from 45 to 64; and 20.4% were 65 years of age or older. The gender makeup of the city was 50.5% male and 49.5% female.

Matt Ingebretson is the mayor of Thornton.

=== 2000 census ===
As of the census of 2000, there were 422 people, 183 households, and 124 families residing in the city. The population density was 338.6 inhabitants per square mile (130.7/km^{2}). There were 193 housing units at an average density of 154.8 per square mile (59.8/km^{2}). The racial makeup of the city was 98.58% White, 0.24% Native American, 0.71% from other races, and 0.47% from two or more races. Hispanic or Latino of any race were 1.18% of the population.

There were 183 households, out of which 24.0% had children under the age of 18 living with them, 59.6% were married couples living together, 5.5% had a female householder with no husband present, and 31.7% were non-families. 29.5% of all households were made up of individuals, and 16.9% had someone living alone who was 65 years of age or older. The average household size was 2.31 and the average family size was 2.81.

Age spread: 21.3% under the age of 18, 9.0% from 18 to 24, 24.9% from 25 to 44, 19.0% from 45 to 64, and 25.8% who were 65 years of age or older. The median age was 42 years. For every 100 females, there were 98.1 males. For every 100 females age 18 and over, there were 98.8 males.

The median income for a household in the city was $35,125, and the median income for a family was $43,750. Males had a median income of $30,893 versus $19,000 for females. The per capita income for the city was $16,622. About 5.0% of families and 11.0% of the population were below the poverty line, including 14.1% of those under age 18 and 6.5% of those age 65 or over.

== Education ==
Thornton is part of the West Fork Community School District, formed in 2011 by the merger of the Sheffield–Chapin–Meservey–Thornton (SCMT) Community School District and the Rockwell–Swaledale Community School District. Thornton became a part of the West Fork Schools whole grade-sharing partnership as of the 2008–09 school year, prior to the formal district merger. SCMT was formed in 2007 by the merger of the Meservey–Thornton Community School District and the Sheffield–Chapin Community School District. Meservey–Thornton, in turn, formed in 1963 from the merger of the Thornton Community School District and the Meservey Community School District.

Thornton Public Library serves the community.

=== Thornton School ===
The school building served the community until 2007. The mascot for secondary athletic teams was the Lancers.

There was a prior school building that was destroyed in a fire. The new building opened in 1936 and received extra classrooms, office space, a gymnasium, and a library in a 1955 addition. The building initially served Thornton and its associated school district only, but after it merged into Meservey–Thornton in 1963 it began serving the consolidated district's senior high school students. Junior high school students were later moved to the building. The Meservey School closed in 1983, making the Thornton School K–12. High school students were moved out of the building as a result of the grade-sharing agreement between Meservey–Thornton and Sheffield–Chapin. At that point the Lancers mascot was now only used at the middle school level.

Due to declining enrollment, the former S-C, M-T, and neighboring Rockwell–Swaledale school districts entered a whole-grade sharing agreement to become the West Fork school system in 2008, with the "Warhawks" as the new mascot. The Thornton building closed after the 2007–08 season after 72 years of service, and all students now attend Sheffield and Rockwell. Each remaining school will have K–3, Rockwell will house 4–8 and Sheffield 9–12. The school districts formally merged in 2011. On July 5, 2008, an all-school reunion was held to commemorate the closing of the Thornton School.

In 2007 the Lancers mascot was discontinued. The Thornton residents held a celebratory farewell parade at that time. The school closed that in July 2008. The Thornton school was demolished in 2012 by the Dumont company Peterson Backhoe; the SCMT district chose demolition after a tentative agreement for another party to buy the building fell through in 2009.
