= Chapin, Iowa =

- Census-designated place
- Location within Iowa
- Coordinates: 42°50′07″N 93°13′19″W
- Country: United States
- State: Iowa
- County: Franklin

Area
  - Total: 0.10 sq mi (0.26 km^{2})
  - Land: 0.10 sq mi (0.26 km^{2})
  - Water: 0 sq mi (0.00 km^{2})
- Elevation: 1,155 ft (352 m)

Population (2020)
  - Total: 71
  - Density: 720.4/sq mi (278.15/km^{2})
- Time zone: UTC-6 (Central (CST))
  - Summer (DST): UTC-5 (CDT)
- Zip Code: 50427
- Area code: 641
- GNIS feature ID: 2585476

Chapin is an unincorporated community and census-designated place (CDP) in northern Franklin County, Iowa, United States. It lies along local roads just off U.S. Route 65, north of the city of Hampton, the county seat of Franklin County. Although Chapin is unincorporated, it has a postal code of 50427. The Chapin post office opened on 29 February 1860 and closed in 2005. As of the 2020 census, its population was 71.

== History ==
Chapin was platted in 1858 by Josiah Bushnell Grinnell, who had previously founded Grinnell, Iowa. He gave this new town the name Chapin, the maiden name of his wife.

The original townsite was established two miles from the original townsite; when the railroad bypassed the community, Chapin was moved. The new site, originally called New Chapin, was established on July 29, 1871. The original townsite died, and New Chapin dropped the "New" in its name, becoming just "Chapin".

The population was 150 in 1940.

== Demographics ==
Historical population
Census	Pop.	Note	%±
2010	87		—
2020	71		−18.4%
U.S. Decennial Census

=== 2020 census ===
As of the census of 2020, there were 71 people, 38 households, and 18 families residing in the community. The population density was 720.4 inhabitants per square mile (278.2/km^{2}). There were 40 housing units at an average density of 405.9 per square mile (156.7/km^{2}). The racial makeup of the community was 85.9% White, 0.0% Black or African American, 0.0% Native American, 0.0% Asian, 0.0% Pacific Islander, 1.4% from other races and 12.7% from two or more races. Hispanic or Latino persons of any race comprised 5.6% of the population.

The most populous ancestries reported in Chapin are Russian (88 | 64.2%), French (22 | 16.1%), and Irish (6 | 4.4%), together accounting for 84.7% of all Chapin residents.

Of the 38 households, 10.5% of which had children under the age of 18 living with them, 44.7% were married couples living together, 5.3% were cohabitating couples, 34.2% had a female householder with no spouse or partner present and 15.8% had a male householder with no spouse or partner present. 52.6% of all households were non-families. 50.0% of all households were made up of individuals, 28.9% had someone living alone who was 65 years old or older.

The median age in the community was 55.3 years. 14.1% of the residents were under the age of 20; 2.8% were between the ages of 20 and 24; 14.1% were from 25 and 44; 36.6% were from 45 and 64; and 32.4% were 65 years of age or older. The gender makeup of the community was 73.2% male and 26.8% female.

== Education ==
Chapin is part of the West Fork Community School District, formed in 2011 by the merger of the Sheffield–Chapin–Meservey–Thornton (SCMT) Community School District and the Rockwell–Swaledale Community School District. SCMT was formed in 1987 by the merger of the Sheffield–Chapin Community School District and the Meservey–Thornton Community School District. Sheffield–Chapin, in turn, formed in 1960 from the merger of the Sheffield Community School District and the Chapin Community School District.

== See also ==
- Faulkner, Iowa
