= Corn Bowl Conference =

Former Iowa High School athletic conference

The Corn Bowl Conference was a high school athletic conference based in north central Iowa. The conference is made up of 1A and 2A schools, the two smallest classification of schools in Iowa.

Beginning in 2015–16, the Corn Bowl Conference and the North Iowa Conference will merge into the Top of Iowa Conference. There will be two divisions. The Top of Iowa - East will include Osage, Mason City Newman, West Fork, North Butler, Central Springs, Northwood-Kensett, Rockford, Nashua-Plainfield, and Saint Ansgar. The Top of Iowa - West will include Eagle Grove, Belmond-Klemme, Garner-Hayfield-Ventura, Forest City, West Hancock, Lake Mills, North Iowa, Algona Bishop Garrigan, and North Union. Riceville will join the Iowa Star Conference that same year. Clarion-Goldfield-Dows has also been involved in talks with the North Iowa Conference but has not acted on changing conference affiliation.

== Former Members ==
Institution	Location	Mascot	Colors	Affiliation	9-11 Enrollment (2013–2014)
Central Springs	Manly	Panthers		Public	183
Nashua-Plainfield	Nashua	Huskies		Public	130
North Butler	Greene	Bearcats		Public	136
Northwood-Kensett	Northwood	Vikings		Public	121
Riceville	Riceville	Wildcats		Public	72
Rockford	Rockford	Warriors		Public	116
Saint Ansgar	Saint Ansgar	Saints		Public	166
West Fork	Sheffield	Warhawks		Public	165

== Modern History ==
In 2000, there were eight schools in the conference. These eight were Greene, Nashua-Plainfield, North Central in Manly, Nora Springs-Rock Falls, Riceville, Rockford, Rockwell-Swaledale, and Saint Ansgar. In 2002, the league got two new members: Northwood-Kensett left the North Iowa Conference for the Corn Bowl, while SCMT in Sheffield joined from the North Star Conference. In 2004, Greene merged with Allison-Bristow to become North Butler, remaining in the conference. In 2007, North Central and Nora Springs-Rock Falls joined together to become the Central Springs school district, dropping league membership to nine schools. The following year that number dropped to eight, as two more league schools, Rockwell-Swaledale and SCMT joined to become West Fork.

The recent success of the conference includes Northwood-Kensett's state championship in men's basketball in 2006–07, North Butler's state championships in women's basketball in 2005–06 and 2006–07, West Fork's 2011 2A state championship in men's basketball, Nashua-Plainfield's 1A state dual wrestling titles in 2004 and 2012, and St. Ansgar's 1A football state championship in 2011.

Riceville Community School District voted unanimously to join the Iowa Star Conference. Riceville would join the Iowa Star in 2015.
