= Sheffield–Chapin–Meservey–Thornton Community School District =

School district in Iowa, United States

The Sheffield–Chapin–Meservey–Thornton (SCMT) Community School District was a school district headquartered in Sheffield, Iowa, serving Sheffield, Chapin, Meservey, and Thornton.

== History ==
It formed on July 1, 2007, as the result of the merger between the Sheffield–Chapin Community School District and the Meservey–Thornton Community School District. Those two districts began a whole-grade sharing agreement, in which students from one school district attend another district's schools for certain levels, in 1988, and these two districts together entered into a whole grade-sharing agreement with the Rockwell–Swaledale Community School District at the high school level in 2004.

The district did not have an election in 2007, even though other area districts did, as it had just merged and already formed a new school board.

Circa 2008 it began a new whole-grade sharing agreement with the Rockwell–Swaledale as "West Fork Schools". In 2010 voters of the two districts formally agreed to merge, with Rockwell–Swaledale district residents approving it on a 253–201 basis, or 55%, while SCMT voters approved on a 501–42 basis, or 92.27%. On July 1, 2011, it merged with Rockwell–Swaledale to form the West Fork Community School District.

== Schools ==
The district had a single SCMT Elementary School, which had 20 employees and 160 students in early 2008.

The common high school pre-July 2008 was SCMT Community High School.

Upon its formation SCMT received the Thornton School, a 1936 building which received extra classrooms, office space, a gymnasium, and a library in a 1955 addition. Thornton had been a combined elementary and junior high school since 1988 as a result of the SCMT grade-sharing agreement. The grade-shared Thornton school retained the Lancers as a mascot, but the mascot now only retained to junior high school teams as the school no longer covered high school. As the SCMT district legally formed in 2007, the Lancers mascot was now no longer in use. SCMT closed the Thornton School in July 2008. The Thornton school was demolished in 2012 by the Dumont company Peterson Backhoe; the SCMT district chose demolition after a tentative agreement for another party to buy the building fell through in 2009.
