= Sheffield, Iowa =

- City
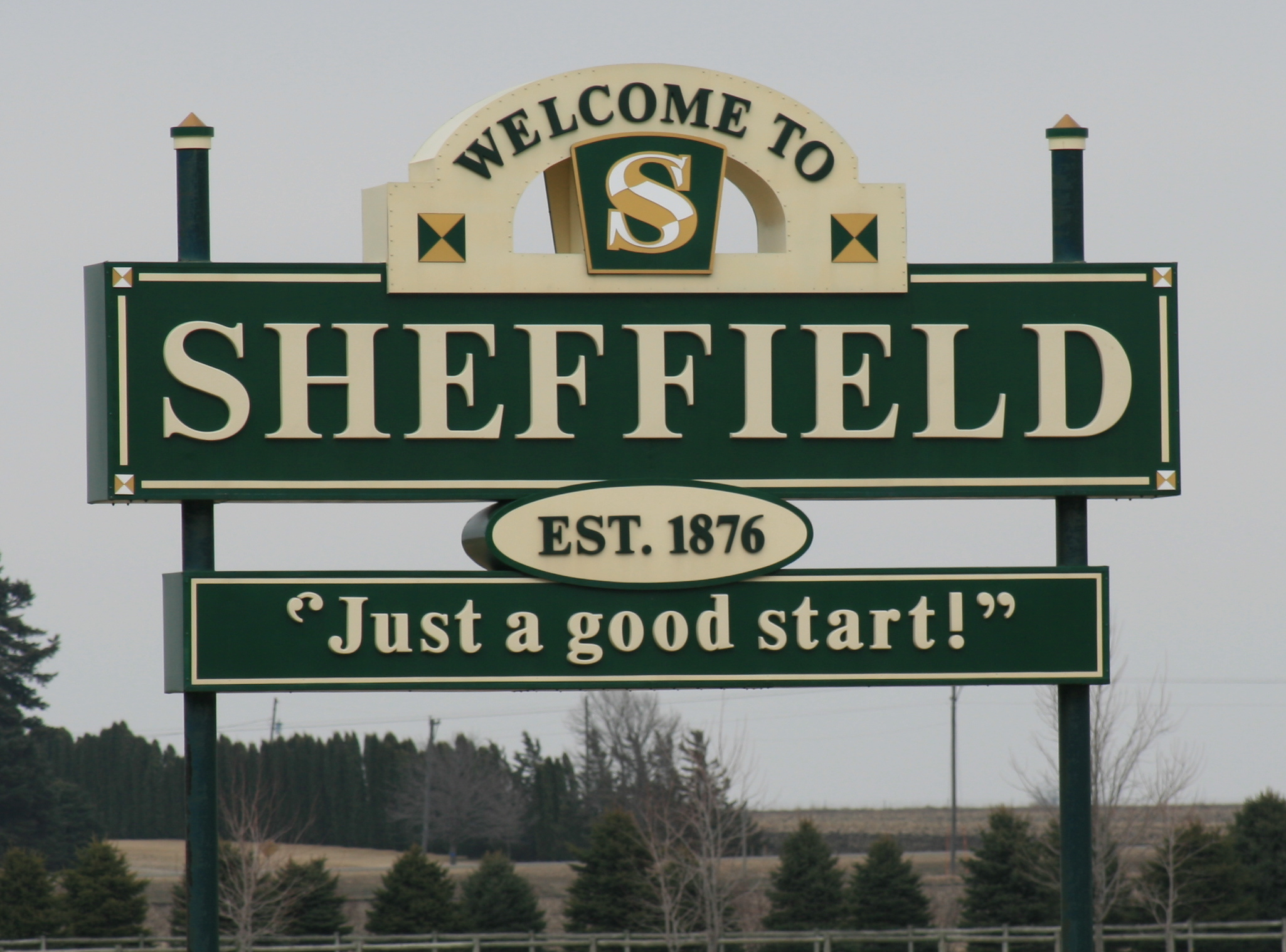

- Location of Sheffield, Iowa
- Coordinates: 42°53′34″N 93°12′31″W
- Country: USA
- State: Iowa
- County: Franklin

Area
  - Total: 5.60 sq mi (14.50 km^{2})
  - Land: 5.57 sq mi (14.42 km^{2})
  - Water: 0.027 sq mi (0.07 km^{2})
- Elevation: 1,073 ft (327 m)

Population (2020)
  - Total: 1,130
  - Density: 202.9/sq mi (78.35/km^{2})
- Time zone: UTC-6 (Central (CST))
  - Summer (DST): UTC-5 (CDT)
- ZIP code: 50475
- Area code: 641
- FIPS code: 19-72210
- GNIS feature ID: 468687
- Website: www.sheffieldiowa.com

Sheffield is a city in Franklin County, Iowa, United States. The population was 1,130 at the time of the 2020 census.

== History ==
Sheffield was platted in 1874, and it was named for a personal friend of the founder's. Sheffield was incorporated in 1876.

== Geography ==
According to the United States Census Bureau, the city has a total area of 5.58 square miles (14.45 km^{2}), of which 5.55 square miles (14.37 km^{2}) is land and 0.03 square miles (0.08 km^{2}) is water.

== Demographics ==
Historical populations
Year	Pop.	±%
1880	307	—
1890	610	+98.7%
1900	688	+12.8%
1910	824	+19.8%
1920	1,106	+34.2%
1930	1,057	−4.4%
1940	1,060	+0.3%
1950	1,163	+9.7%
1960	1,156	−0.6%
1970	1,070	−7.4%
1980	1,224	+14.4%
1990	1,174	−4.1%
2000	930	−20.8%
2010	1,172	+26.0%
2020	1,130	−3.6%
Source:"U.S. Census website". United States Census Bureau. and Iowa Data Center; Source: U.S. Decennial Census

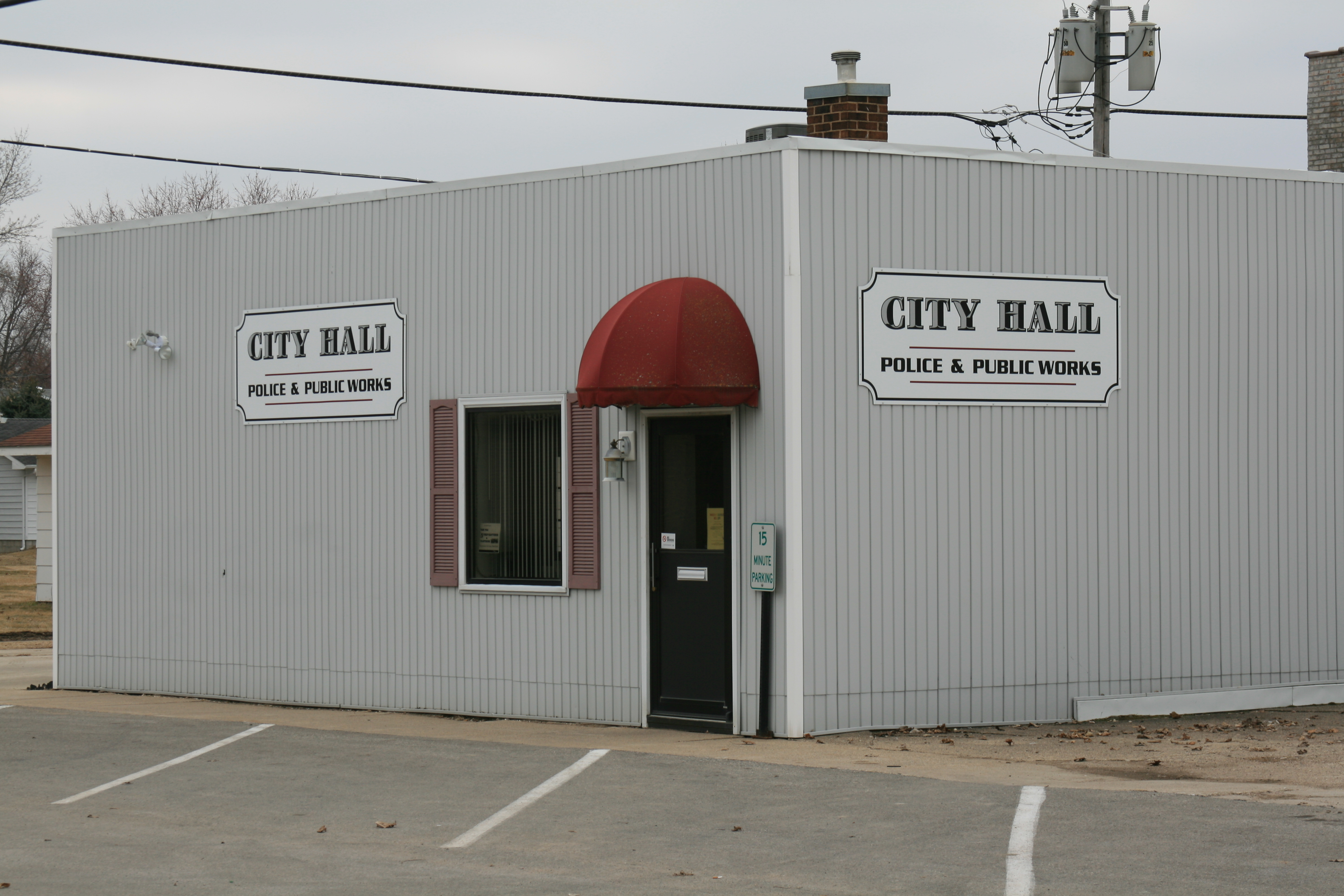
Sheffield City Hall

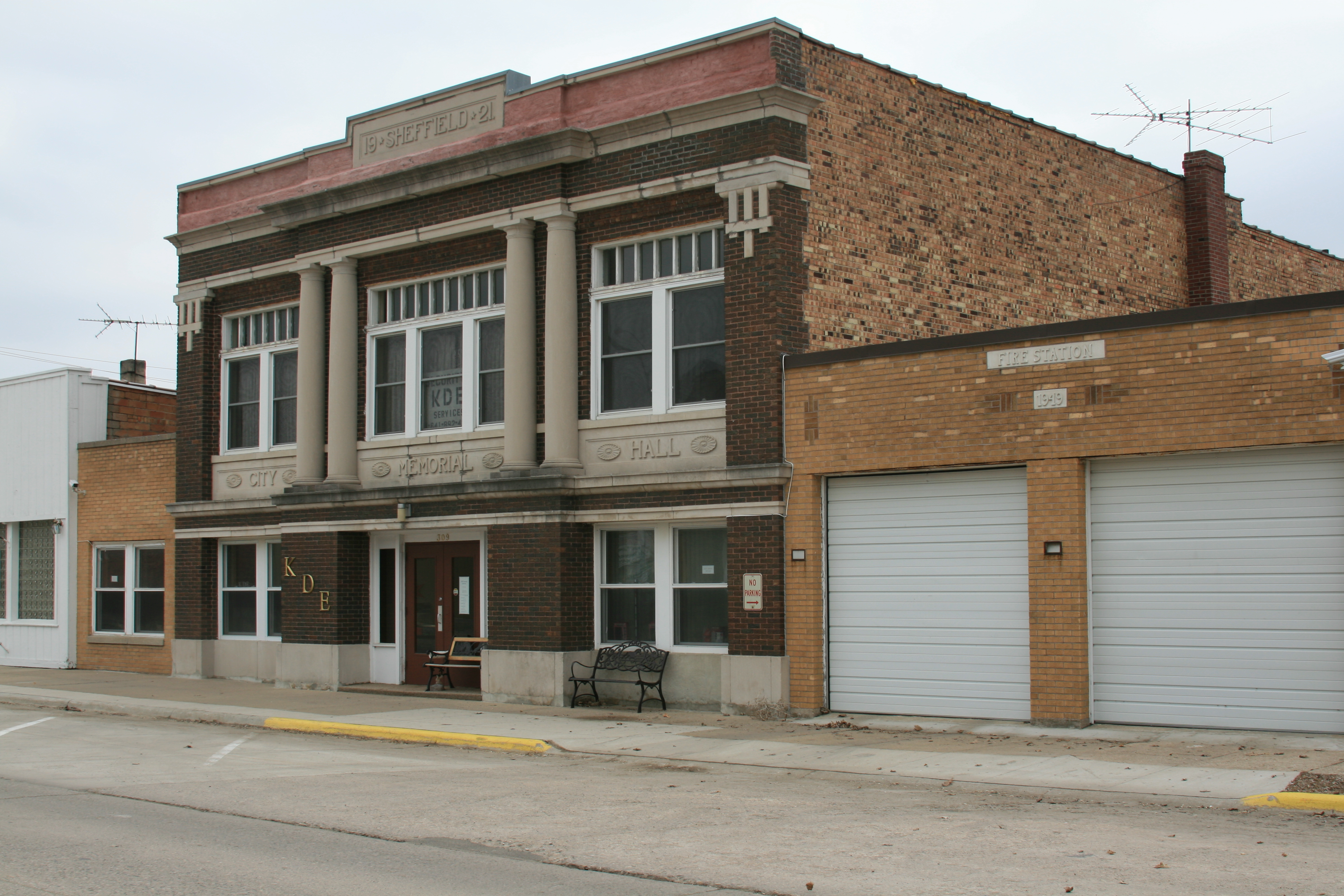
Buildings in downtown Sheffield

=== 2020 census ===
As of the 2020 census, there were 1,130 people, 472 households, and 314 families residing in the city. The median age was 43.3 years. 21.9% of residents were under the age of 18. For every 100 females there were 93.8 males, and for every 100 females age 18 and over there were 88.7 males age 18 and over.

23.7% of residents were under the age of 20; 4.5% were between the ages of 20 and 24; 23.5% were from 25 to 44; 25.0% were from 45 to 64; and 23.3% were 65 years of age or older. The gender makeup of the city was 48.4% male and 51.6% female.

0.0% of residents lived in urban areas, while 100.0% lived in rural areas.

Of the 472 households, 29.0% had children under the age of 18 living with them, 55.5% were married-couple households, 7.8% were cohabiting-couple households, 21.8% had a female householder with no spouse or partner present, and 14.8% had a male householder with no spouse or partner present. 33.5% of households were non-families. 26.6% of all households were made up of individuals, and 16.1% had someone living alone who was 65 years of age or older.

There were 501 housing units, of which 5.8% were vacant. The homeowner vacancy rate was 1.1% and the rental vacancy rate was 13.0%. The population density was 202.9 inhabitants per square mile (78.4/km^{2}), and the average housing unit density was 90.0 per square mile (34.7/km^{2}).

Racial composition as of the 2020 census
Race	Number	Percent
White	1,058	93.6%
Black or African American	9	0.8%
American Indian and Alaska Native	2	0.2%
Asian	7	0.6%
Native Hawaiian and Other Pacific Islander	0	0.0%
Some other race	6	0.5%
Two or more races	48	4.2%
Hispanic or Latino (of any race)	18	1.6%

=== 2010 census ===
As of the census of 2010, there were 1,172 people, 480 households, and 323 families living in the city. The population density was 211.2 inhabitants per square mile (81.5/km^{2}). There were 510 housing units at an average density of 91.9 per square mile (35.5/km^{2}). The racial makeup of the city was 98.2% White, 0.2% African American, 0.3% Native American, 0.5% Asian, 0.1% Pacific Islander, 0.1% from other races, and 0.6% from two or more races. Hispanic or Latino of any race were 0.9% of the population.

There were 480 households, of which 27.7% had children under the age of 18 living with them, 58.5% were married couples living together, 5.4% had a female householder with no husband present, 3.3% had a male householder with no wife present, and 32.7% were non-families. 29.8% of all households were made up of individuals, and 14.6% had someone living alone who was 65 years of age or older. The average household size was 2.36 and the average family size was 2.93.

The median age in the city was 44.6 years. 23.5% of residents were under the age of 18; 6.7% were between the ages of 18 and 24; 20.3% were from 25 to 44; 26.6% were from 45 to 64; and 22.7% were 65 years of age or older. The gender makeup of the city was 47.4% male and 52.6% female.

=== 2000 census ===
As of the census of 2000, there were 930 people, 369 households, and 259 families living in the city. The population density was 167.4 inhabitants per square mile (64.6/km^{2}). There were 397 housing units at an average density of 71.5 per square mile (27.6/km^{2}). The racial makeup of the city was 99.14% White, 0.32% Asian, and 0.54% from two or more races. Hispanic or Latino of any race were 0.65% of the population.

There were 369 households, out of which 30.4% had children under the age of 18 living with them, 58.5% were married couples living together, 8.4% had a female householder with no husband present, and 29.8% were non-families. 27.6% of all households were made up of individuals, and 20.9% had someone living alone who was 65 years of age or older. The average household size was 2.37 and the average family size was 2.86.

23.4% are under the age of 18, 6.8% from 18 to 24, 21.3% from 25 to 44, 22.9% from 45 to 64, and 25.6% who were 65 years of age or older. The median age was 44 years. For every 100 females, there were 84.9 males. For every 100 females age 18 and over, there were 74.9 males.

The median income for a household in the city was $38,594, and the median income for a family was $48,472. Males had a median income of $31,544 versus $22,237 for females. The per capita income for the city was $16,980. About 3.6% of families and 5.3% of the population were below the poverty line, including 0.9% of those under age 18 and 15.1% of those age 65 or over.

== Education ==
Sheffield is part of the West Fork Community School District, formed in 2011 by the merger of the Sheffield–Chapin–Meservey–Thornton (SCMT) Community School District and the Rockwell–Swaledale Community School District. SCMT was formed in 2007 by the merger of the Sheffield–Chapin Community School District and the Meservey–Thornton Community School District. Sheffield–Chapin, in turn, formed in 1960 from the merger of the Sheffield Community School District and the Chapin Community School District.

== Notable people ==
- Fred Schwengel, U.S. representative from Iowa
