= Meservey–Thornton Community School District =

Defunct school district in Iowa, United States

Meservey–Thornton Community School District was a school district headquartered in Thornton, Iowa, serving Thornton and Meservey.

== History ==
It formed in 1963 as the result of the merger between the Meservey Consolidated School District and the Thornton Community School District. The district initially operated schools in both Meservey and Thornton. It closed the school in Meservey in 1983.

In the fall of 1988, the district began a whole-grade sharing agreement, in which students from one school district attend another district's schools for certain levels, with the Sheffield–Chapin Community School District. At that point the Sheffield building hosted the senior high school (grades 9–12) while the Thornton building housed the middle school (grades 5–8). These two districts together entered into a whole grade-sharing agreement with the Rockwell–Swaledale Community School District at the high school level in 2004; the Rockwell–Swaledale and Sheffield–Chapin–Meservey–Thornton high schools at the time remained separate, but shared students and programs.

On July 1, 2007, Sheffield–Chapin and Meservey–Thornton legally merged into the Sheffield–Chapin–Meservey–Thornton (SCMT) Community School District.

== Schools ==
Upon the district's formation it had its elementary and middle school grades in Meservey while its high school was in Thornton. The mascot of the Thornton School was the Lancers. The Thornton school had been built in 1936 and received extra classrooms, office space, a gymnasium, and a library in a 1955 addition. Junior high school students were later moved to Thornton. The Meservey School closed in 1983, making the Thornton School K–12. High school students were moved out of the building as a result of the grade-sharing agreement between Meservey–Thornton and Sheffield–Chapin. The Lancers mascot only remained for middle school sports teams after 1988, and it was no longer in use after 2007. The Thornton School closed in 2008 by the consolidated SCMT district and was demolished in 2012.
