= Sheffield–Chapin Community School District =

School district in Iowa, United States

Sheffield–Chapin Community School District was a school district headquartered in Sheffield, Iowa, serving Sheffield and Chapin.

== History ==
It formed in 1960 as the result of the merger between the Sheffield Community School District and the Chapin Community School District. In fall 1988 the district began a whole-grade sharing agreement, in which students from one school district attend another district's schools for certain levels, with the Meservey–Thornton Community School District. At that point the Sheffield building hosted the senior high school (grades 9–12) while Thornton building housed the middle school (grades 5–8). These two districts together entered into a whole grade-sharing agreement with the Rockwell–Swaledale Community School District at the high school level in 2004; the Rockwell–Swaledale and Sheffield–Chapin–Meservey–Thornton high schools at the time remained separate but shared students and programs.

On July 1, 2007, Sheffield–Chapin and Meservey–Thornton legally merged into the Sheffield–Chapin–Meservey–Thornton (SCMT) Community School District.
