= Rockwell–Swaledale Community School District =

Former school district in Iowa, United States

Rockwell–Swaledale Community School District was a school district headquartered in Rockwell, Iowa, USA. Located in Cerro Gordo County, it served Rockwell and Swaledale.

== History ==
The district was formed in 1960 by the merger of the Rockwell Community School District and the Swaledale Community School District.

In fall 2004, Rockwell–Swaledale entered into a whole grade-sharing agreement, in which students from one school district attend another district's schools for certain levels, with the Sheffield–Chapin Community School District and the Meservey–Thornton Community School District, at the high school level; the Rockwell–Swaledale and Sheffield–Chapin–Meservey–Thornton high schools at the time remained separate but shared students and programs. The Sheffield–Chapin and Meservey–Thornton school districts, which had already entered into their own whole grade-sharing agreement with one another, legally merged into the Sheffield–Chapin–Meservey–Thornton (SCMT) Community School District in 2007.

Circa 2008, Rockwell–Swaledale began a new whole grade-sharing agreement with SCMT as "West Fork Schools". In 2010 voters of the two districts formally agreed to merge, with Rockwell–Swaledale district residents approving it on a 253–201 basis, or 55%, while SCMT voters approved on a 501–42 basis, or 92.27%. On July 1, 2011, it merged with SCMT to form the West Fork Community School District.
