= Hamilton Township, Franklin County, Iowa =

Hamilton Township
- Township
- Location in Franklin County
- Coordinates: 42°41′15″N 93°19′15″W
- Country: United States
- State: Iowa
- County: Franklin

Area
  - Total: 36.2 sq mi (93.8 km^{2})
  - Land: 36.2 sq mi (93.8 km^{2})
  - Water: 0 sq mi (0 km^{2}) 0%
- Elevation: 1,227 ft (374 m)

Population (2010)
  - Total: 155
  - Density: 4.4/sq mi (1.7/km^{2})
- Time zone: UTC-6 (CST)
  - Summer (DST): UTC-5 (CDT)
- ZIP codes: 50071, 50441, 50452
- GNIS feature ID: 0467992

Hamilton Township is one of sixteen townships in Franklin County, Iowa, United States. As of the 2010 census, its population was 155 and it contained 75 housing units.

== History ==
Hamilton Township was created in 1871. It was named for Andrew Hamilton, a pioneer settler and native of Ireland.

== Geography ==
As of the 2010 census, Hamilton Township covered an area of 36.22 square miles (93.8 km^{2}), all land.

=== Cities, towns, villages ===
- Coulter (southeast quarter)

=== Cemeteries ===
The township contains Saint Johns Lutheran Cemetery.

== School districts ==
- CAL Community School District
- Dows Community School District
- Hampton–Dumont Community School District

== Political districts ==
- Iowa's 4th congressional district
- State House District 54
- State Senate District 27
