= Lee Township, Franklin County, Iowa =

Lee Township
- Township
- Location in Franklin County
- Coordinates: 42°36′02″N 93°19′17″W
- Country: United States
- State: Iowa
- County: Franklin

Area
  - Total: 36.24 sq mi (93.85 km^{2})
  - Land: 36.24 sq mi (93.85 km^{2})
  - Water: 0 sq mi (0 km^{2}) 0%
- Elevation: 1,201 ft (366 m)

Population (2010)
  - Total: 179
  - Density: 4.9/sq mi (1.9/km^{2})
- Time zone: UTC-6 (CST)
  - Summer (DST): UTC-5 (CDT)
- ZIP codes: 50006, 50071, 50126
- GNIS feature ID: 0468199

Lee Township is one of sixteen townships in Franklin County, Iowa, United States. As of the 2010 census, its population was 179 and it contained 80 housing units.

== History ==
Lee Township was created in 1870. First called Iowa Township, it was soon renamed in honor of William H. Lee, a pioneer settler.

== Geography ==
As of the 2010 census, Lee Township covered an area of 36.24 square miles (93.9 km^{2}), all land.

=== Unincorporated towns ===
- Burdette at 42.5719223°N 93.3602049°W

(This list is based on USGS data and may include former settlements.)

== School districts ==
- Alden Community School District
- Dows Community School District
- Hampton–Dumont Community School District
- Iowa Falls Community School District

== Political districts ==
- Iowa's 4th congressional district
- State House District 54
- State Senate District 27
