= Marion Township, Franklin County, Iowa =

Marion Township
- Township
- Location in Franklin County
- Coordinates: 42°46′30″N 93°19′15″W
- Country: United States
- State: Iowa
- County: Franklin

Area
  - Total: 36.59 sq mi (94.78 km^{2})
  - Land: 36.56 sq mi (94.69 km^{2})
  - Water: 0.035 sq mi (0.09 km^{2}) 0.09%
- Elevation: 1,237 ft (377 m)

Population (2010)
  - Total: 1,030
  - Density: 28/sq mi (10.9/km^{2})
- Time zone: UTC-6 (CST)
  - Summer (DST): UTC-5 (CDT)
- ZIP codes: 50431, 50441, 50452, 50475
- GNIS feature ID: 0468351

Marion Township is one of sixteen townships in Franklin County, Iowa, United States. As of the 2010 census, its population was 1,030 and it contained 464 housing units.

== History ==
Marion Township was organized in 1874.

== Geography ==
As of the 2010 census, Marion Township covered an area of 36.6 square miles (95 km^{2}); of this, 36.56 square miles (94.7 km^{2}) (99.91 percent) was land and 0.03 square miles (0.078 km^{2}) (0.09 percent) was water.

=== Cities, towns, villages ===
- Coulter (northeast half)
- Latimer

=== Unincorporated towns ===
- Washington at 42.7477507°N 93.2713135°W

(This list is based on USGS data and may include former settlements.)

=== Cemeteries ===
The township contains Coulter Cemetery, Marion Center Cemetery and Saint Pauls Evangelical Lutheran Cemetery.

=== Transportation ===
- Interstate 35
- Iowa Highway 3

== School districts ==
- CAL Community School District
- Hampton–Dumont Community School District
- West Fork Community School District

== Political districts ==
- Iowa's 4th congressional district
- State House District 54
- State Senate District 27
