= Oakland Township, Franklin County, Iowa =

Oakland Township
- Township
- Location in Franklin County
- Coordinates: 42°36′04″N 93°26′24″W
- Country: United States
- State: Iowa
- County: Franklin

Area
  - Total: 36.36 sq mi (94.18 km^{2})
  - Land: 36.34 sq mi (94.11 km^{2})
  - Water: 0.027 sq mi (0.07 km^{2}) 0.07%
- Elevation: 1,152 ft (351 m)

Population (2010)
  - Total: 216
  - Density: 6.0/sq mi (2.3/km^{2})
- Time zone: UTC-6 (CST)
  - Summer (DST): UTC-5 (CDT)
- ZIP codes: 50006, 50071, 50227
- GNIS feature ID: 0468457

Oakland Township is one of sixteen townships in Franklin County, Iowa, United States. As of the 2010 census, its population was 216 and it contained 121 housing units.

== History ==
Oakland Township was created in 1868.

== Geography ==
As of the 2010 census, Oakland Township covered an area of 36.36 square miles (94.2 km^{2}); of this, 36.34 square miles (94.1 km^{2}) (99.93 percent) was land and 0.03 square miles (0.078 km^{2}) (0.07 percent) was water.

=== Cities, towns, villages ===
- Popejoy

=== Unincorporated towns ===
- Oakland at 42.5810884°N 93.4432620°W

(This list is based on USGS data and may include former settlements.)

=== Cemeteries ===
The township contains Oakland Valley Cemetery, Olson Cemetery and Otis Grove Cemetery.

=== Transportation ===
- Interstate 35

== School districts ==
- Alden Community School District
- Dows Community School District
- Iowa Falls Community School District

== Political districts ==
- Iowa's 4th congressional district
- State House District 54
- State Senate District 27
