= Scott Township, Franklin County, Iowa =

Scott Township
- Township
- Location in Franklin County
- Coordinates: 42°46′31″N 93°26′22″W
- Country: United States
- State: Iowa
- County: Franklin

Area
  - Total: 36.81 sq mi (95.34 km^{2})
  - Land: 36.80 sq mi (95.32 km^{2})
  - Water: 0.012 sq mi (0.03 km^{2}) 0.03%
- Elevation: 1,266 ft (386 m)

Population (2010)
  - Total: 382
  - Density: 10/sq mi (4/km^{2})
- Time zone: UTC-6 (CST)
  - Summer (DST): UTC-5 (CDT)
- ZIP codes: 50071, 50420, 50452
- GNIS feature ID: 0468668

Scott Township is one of sixteen townships in Franklin County, Iowa, United States. As of the 2010 census, its population was 382 and it contained 178 housing units.

== History ==
Scott Township was created in 1878.

== Geography ==
As of the 2010 census, Scott Township covered an area of 36.81 square miles (95.3 km^{2}); of this, 36.8 square miles (95 km^{2}) (99.97 percent) was land and 0.01 square miles (0.026 km^{2}) (0.03 percent) was water.

=== Cities, towns, villages ===
- Alexander
- Coulter (west quarter)

=== Cemeteries ===
The township contains Alexander Cemetery.

=== Transportation ===
- Interstate 35
- Iowa Highway 107
- Iowa Highway 3

== School districts ==
- Belmond–Klemme Community School District
- CAL Community School District
- Dows Community School District

== Political districts ==
- Iowa's 4th congressional district
- State House District 54
- State Senate District 27
