= North Central Conference (Iowa) =

Iowa High School athletic conference

- Conference: IHSAA / IGHSAU
- Founded: 1930
- Sports fielded: 18
- No. of teams: 12
- Region: North central Iowa
- Website: www.northcentralconf.org

Locations
- Current Members

The North Central Conference (NCC) is a twelve-team high school athletic conference based in North Central Iowa. The conference's membership is 3A (Iowa's second largest classification of schools), 2A, and sometimes even 1A (Iowa's smallest classification of schools). The conference dates to 1930 and has a long tradition together and many intense rivalries.

For many years, the North Central Conference was an eight-team league. Schools from Algona, Clarion, Clear Lake, Eagle Grove, Hampton, Humboldt, Iowa Falls, and Webster City competed in the conference. In the 1980s, Hampton and Clarion both began whole grade-sharing with smaller neighboring districts (Dumont and Goldfield, respectively). The districts reorganized into Hampton–Dumont and Clarion–Goldfield, respectively.

In 1993–94, the league expanded to include two of the region's strongest Catholic schools: Bishop Garrigan of Algona and St. Edmond of Fort Dodge.

Iowa Falls and Alden began whole grade-sharing in 2004, as did Clarion–Goldfield and Dows in 2005. Clarion–Goldfield and Dows consolidated into Clarion–Goldfield–Dows in 2014.

Humboldt and Twin Rivers began whole grade-sharing in 2012. Algona and Titonka began whole grade-sharing in 2012 and consolidated in 2014, and Lu Verne began whole grade-sharing with Algona in 2015. Webster City and Northeast Hamilton will begin a whole grade-sharing agreement in 2015 as well.

Despite the deep roots the member schools have with the conference, the disparity in the size of conference schools has recently become a pressing issue for league members. CAL (in Latimer) is looking at potentially beginning whole grade-sharing with Hampton–Dumont in 2018.

In October 2012, Bishop Garrigan Catholic looked at moving to the North Iowa Conference. In December 2012, NIC accepted Bishop Garrigan's request to join their conference and the move became official in 2014.

On Monday, December 10, 2012, the Eagle Grove Community School Board voted in favor of applying for North Iowa Conference membership. This was approved by the North Iowa Conference. Clarion–Goldfield–Dows has also been involved in discussions with the NIC, however no action was taken by CGD. Other NCC member institutions such as Iowa Falls-Alden, Hampton–Dumont, and St. Edmond have also suggested possible interest in leaving the NCC.

In February, the NCC superintendents approved on 9–0 and 8–0 votes to move to divisional play. There will be a large school division and a small school division, determined by enrollment. In basketball, baseball, and softball, teams will play schools in their own division twice and schools in the other division twice as well. It is hoped that this will not only hold the remaining eight teams of the NCC together, but also attract surrounding schools into the league. The large school division includes Webster City, Algona, Humboldt, and Iowa Falls-Alden. The small school division includes Clear Lake, Hampton–Dumont, Clarion–Goldfield–Dows, and St. Edmond.

In late 2024, the school districts of Eagle Grove, Forest City and Garner-Hayfield-Ventura voted to join and re-join (in Eagle Grove's case) the North Central Conference for the 2026-27 schoolyear. The 3 largest schools in the Top of Iowa Conference joined former Northeast Iowa Conference member Charles City to expand the league from 8 schools to 12 schools and usher in a divisional era of NCC athletics with the Tradition Division and Pride Division.

The Tradition Division will house the NCC's larger schools based on a 3-year BEDS enrollment average and will include Webster City, Charles City, Humboldt, Algona, Hampton-Dumont-CAL and Clear Lake. The Pride Division will house the NCC's smaller schools based on said BEDS enrollment average and will include Iowa Falls-Alden, Forest City, Clarion-Goldfield-Dows, Eagle Grove, Garner-Hayfield-Ventura and St. Edmond.

== Members ==
Institution	Location	Mascot	Colors	Affiliation	2026-2027 BEDS	Football class
Tradition Division
Algona	Algona	Bulldogs		Public	346	3A
Charles City	Charles City	Comets		Public	294	3A
Clear Lake	Clear Lake	Lions		Public	351	3A
Hampton–Dumont/CAL	Hampton	Bulldogs		Public	297	2A
Humboldt	Humboldt	Wildcats		Public	324	3A
Webster City	Webster City	Lynx		Public	386	3A
Pride Division
Clarion–Goldfield–Dows	Clarion	Cowboys		Public	196	1A
Eagle Grove	Eagle Grove	Eagles		Public	206	1A
Forest City	Forest City	Indians		Public	248	2A
Garner-Hayfield-Ventura	Garner	Cardinals		Public	190	1A
Iowa Falls–Alden	Iowa Falls	Cadets		Public	297	3A
St. Edmond's Catholic	Fort Dodge	Gaels		Private, Catholic	120	8P

=== Former members ===
Institution	Location	Mascot	Colors	Affiliation	2022-2023 BEDS	Current Conference
Bishop Garrigan Catholic	Algona	Golden Bears		Private	99	Top of Iowa Conference
Eagle Grove	Eagle Grove	Eagles		Public	239	Top of Iowa Conference
