= Grant Township, Franklin County, Iowa =

Grant Township
- Township
- Location in Franklin County
- Coordinates: 42°36′01″N 93°12′11″W
- Country: United States
- State: Iowa
- County: Franklin

Area
  - Total: 35.8 sq mi (92.8 km^{2})
  - Land: 35.8 sq mi (92.8 km^{2})
  - Water: 0 sq mi (0 km^{2}) 0%
- Elevation: 1,201 ft (366 m)

Population (2010)
  - Total: 331
  - Density: 9.3/sq mi (3.6/km^{2})
- Time zone: UTC-6 (CST)
  - Summer (DST): UTC-5 (CDT)
- ZIP codes: 50041, 50126, 50441, 50601, 50633
- GNIS feature ID: 0467937

Grant Township is one of sixteen townships in Franklin County, Iowa, United States. As of the 2010 census, its population was 331 and it contained 154 housing units.

== History ==
Grant Township was created in 1870.

== Geography ==
As of the 2010 census, Grant Township covered an area of 35.83 square miles (92.8 km^{2}), all land.

=== Cities, towns, villages ===
- Bradford

=== Cemeteries ===
The township contains Pleasant Hill Cemetery and Saint Peters Evangelical Cemetery.

=== Transportation ===
- Iowa Highway 57
- U.S. Route 20
- U.S. Route 65

== School districts ==
- AGWSR Community School District
- Hampton–Dumont Community School District
- Iowa Falls Community School District

== Political districts ==
- Iowa's 4th congressional district
- State House District 54
- State Senate District 27
