= June 12–13, 2013 derecho series =

Series of weather events

June 12–13, 2013 Derecho Series
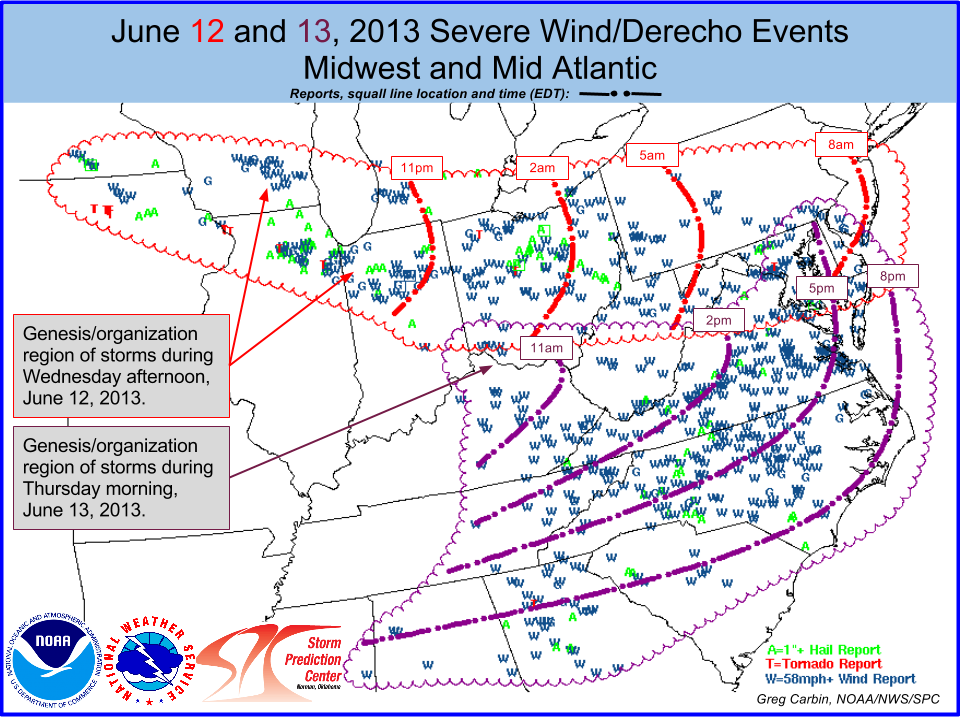
- Map of the two derecho events across the United States
- Date(s): June 12–13, 2013
- Duration: 11:00 p.m.–11:00 a.m. June 12–13 (12 hours); 11:00 a.m.–8:00 p.m. June 13 (9 hours) (UTC-04:00)
- Peak wind gust (measured): 95 mph (153 km/h; 42.5 m/s) (NW of Wabash, Indiana, on June 12)
- Largest hail: 2.75 in (7.0 cm) (Wells, Minnesota, on June 12 and W of Callaway, Maryland, on June 13)
- Tornado count: 30
- Strongest tornado^{1}: EF3 tornado
- Fatalities: 4
- Damage costs: Unknown
- Areas affected: United States Midwest, United States Mid-Atlantic, Southeastern United States
- ^{1}Most severe tornado damage; see Enhanced Fujita scale

From June 12 to June 13, 2013, two derechos occurred across different areas of the Eastern United States. The initial derecho formed on the afternoon of June 12 and tracked across a large section of the Midwestern United States, the central Appalachians, and the Mid-Atlantic states before moving into the Atlantic Ocean during the morning of June 13. A second, more widespread and intense derecho occurred on June 13 across the Southeastern United States, resulting in major wind damage across North Carolina, Virginia, and Maryland, among other states. These storms caused at least three deaths and extensive damage property damage – resulting from both tornadoes and straight-line winds – from Iowa to South Carolina. 28 tornadoes touched down in Iowa, Illinois, Ohio, Georgia, North Carolina, Maryland, Virginia, and Tennessee. One of the tornadoes in Iowa was rated as a high-end EF3, destroying a restaurant and two houses. One person was injured by another tornado, rated EF2, in Carroll County, Illinois, and nine people were injured by an EF1 in Cherokee County, Georgia.

== Storm overview ==
An upper level disturbance across the northern Great Plains interacted with a warm and moist air mass on the afternoon of June 12. This interaction led to the development of supercell thunderstorms across Iowa, Illinois, Wisconsin, and Minnesota. The cells gradually formed into a squall line and turned into a derecho in the Chicago area that evening.

=== June 12 supercells ===
Between 3 and 4 p.m. CDT (2000–2100 UTC) on June 12, numerous supercell thunderstorms developed across Iowa, Illinois, Wisconsin, and Minnesota. These supercells resulted in seven of the 13 tornadoes that touched down that day. Five tornadoes were confirmed across Wright and Franklin counties in Iowa. One of the tornadoes was rated high-end EF3, destroying two houses and a restaurant. Other tornadoes were rated EF2, EF1, and EF0, with numerous farm buildings suffering major damage. Two other tornadoes – rated EF0 and EF2 – touched down in Jo Daviess and Carroll County, Illinois. One person was injured near Savanna.

=== June 12–13 derecho ===
The supercell activity in Iowa and Illinois congealed into a powerful squall line as the storms moved into Indiana later that night. The newly formed derecho began producing numerous reports of damaging winds in northern Indiana. As the storms reached the town of Wabash, an embedded downburst within the main line produced winds up to 100 mph (160 km/h) in the town. Farm structures were destroyed and trees were snapped and uprooted. The derecho continued into Ohio and produced widespread damaging winds across much of the state, along with several embedded tornadoes. Henry County, Ohio, documented four separate touchdowns, and a total of nine tornadoes occurred in Ohio that night.

The derecho continued eastward into the early morning hours of the 13th, through Pennsylvania, Virginia, West Virginia, Maryland, New Jersey, and Delaware, producing wind damage in each state before dissipating.

=== June 13 derecho ===
On the morning of the 13, another linear complex of severe storms developed along a line near the southern border of Ohio. The storms eventually strengthened into a powerful derecho and raced to the south and east. As the storms reached eastern Tennessee and Kentucky, hundreds of damaging wind reports began coming into the Storm Prediction Center. In the Atlanta area, the storms produced two embedded EF1 tornadoes that moved through several suburbs. One of the tornadoes struck Canton, Georgia, and injured nine people. Fatalities and injuries occurred as a result of falling trees and power lines as the storms ripped through North Carolina and Virginia, along with numerous reports of damaging winds and power outages. The derecho downed numerous trees and damaged structures in West Virginia as well, with surveys indicating winds up to 80 mph (130 km/h) in some areas

In Maryland, the derecho produced an unusually fast moving, long track EF0 tornado that tracked through several northern DC suburbs, downing many trees, several of which landed on homes. Emdedded tornadoes also occurred in Tennessee, Virginia, and North Carolina. The derecho moved out over the Atlantic Ocean and dissipated later that evening. The SPC received a total of 794 damaging wind reports that day.

== Confirmed tornadoes ==
Confirmed tornadoes by Enhanced Fujita rating
EFU	EF0	EF1	EF2	EF3	EF4	EF5	Total
0	17	10	2	1	0	0	30

=== June 12 event ===
List of confirmed tornadoes – Wednesday, June 12, 2013 (Note: All dates are based on the local time zone where the tornado touched down; however, all times are in Coordinated Universal Time for consistency.)
EF#	Location	County / Parish	State	Start Coord.	Time (UTC)	Path length	Max width	Summary
EF3	Belmond	Wright	IA	42.8824°N 93.6832°W	2108 – 2127	6.2 mi (10.0 km)	200 yd (180 m)	High-end EF3 tornado touched down to the northwest of Belmond and tracked generally southeast, damaging a machine shed. Quickly intensifying, it reached EF2 strength as it struck a farmstead, causing significant damage. As it approached U.S. Highway 69, it reached high-end EF3 intensity. A home was detached from its cinder-block foundation and destroyed, and several business were heavily damaged, including a restaurant. A warehouse was also destroyed and partially swept off its foundation. Damage was relatively light for the remainder of the track northeast and east of town, with the tornado later roping out and dissipating to the east-southeast of Belmond. The tornado crossed the track of the 2119 UTC EF1 tornado that had passed through area east of Belmond almost 10 minutes earlier.
EF1	ESE of Belmond	Wright	IA	42.849°N 93.6044°W	2119 – 2132	5 mi (8.0 km)	125 yd (114 m)	As the 2108 UTC EF3 tornado was north of Belmond (eight minutes before the EF3 dissipated), another tornado touched down to the east of town. This tornado remained over mostly open areas, though it knocked a mesonet station off the roof of the elementary school and downed a grove of trees.
EF0	NW of Belmond	Wright	IA	42.8703°N 93.663°W	2121 – 2124	1.13 mi (1.82 km)	50 yd (46 m)	An anticyclonic tornado on the backside of the Belmond EF3 tornado moved across open farmland.
EF2	NNE of Alexander to NW of Latimer	Franklin	IA	42.8246°N 93.4745°W	2132 – 2144	5.2 mi (8.4 km)	300 yd (270 m)	As the 2126 UTC EF1 storm was dissipating, this tornado touched down further east. It heavily damaged several farms before dissipating just before reaching Interstate 35.
EF1	NE of Latimer to NW of Hampton	Franklin	IA	42.7917°N 93.3297°W	2146 – 2155	3.43 mi (5.52 km)	75 yd (69 m)	A small tornado damaged the roof of a barn and downed about a dozen trees at two farmsteads.
EF1	S of Shabbona	DeKalb	IL	41.7344°N 88.8923°W	2132 – 2137	2.27 mi (3.65 km)	100 yd (91 m)	Many trees and power poles were downed and one structure suffered minor shingle damage.
EF0	NW of Hampton	Franklin	IA	42.7939°N 93.2892°W	2153 – 2156	1.26 mi (2.03 km)	125 yd (114 m)	A well-documented tornado remained over open farmland.
EF0	NW of Hampton	Franklin	IA	42.7771°N 93.2299°W	2156 – 2159	1.11 mi (1.79 km)	50 yd (46 m)	Weak tornado caused minor damage to the roof of a barn and downed several trees.
EF0	S of Hanover	Jo Daviess	IL	42.2178°N 90.2422°W	2350	0.5 mi (0.80 km)	20 yd (18 m)	Brief, weak tornado with no damage.
EF2	N of Savanna to W of Mount Carroll	Carroll	IL	42.1668°N 90.15°W	2353 – 0003	6.6 mi (10.6 km)	880 yd (800 m)	A home was pushed off of its foundation, several outbuildings were damaged, and many trees were downed. One person was injured.
EF0	NW of Manteno	Kankakee	IL	41.2924°N 87.9086°W	0050 – 0051	0.24 mi (0.39 km)	50 yd (46 m)	Brief tornado touched down at a farmstead and collapsed a barn, killing a horse. Debris was tossed about 75 yd (69 m) to the southeast into a field, where the tornado dissipated.
EF0	Southern Willshire	Van Wert	OH	40.7469°N 84.8016°W	0327 – 0330	0.64 mi (1.03 km)	80 yd (73 m)	Weak, brief tornado on the south side of town caused major roof and window damage to 13 homes and rolled a garage off of its cinder-block foundation. One house lost a portion of its roof and it was thrown over the top of a neighboring house. Several trees were downed as well.
EF0	NW of Rockford	Mercer	OH	40.72°N 84.68°W	0335 – 0336	0.06 mi (0.097 km)	100 yd (91 m)	Part of the roof was removed from an aluminum barn and the barn had four large doors blown out. Debris from this buildings caused damage to surrounding structures, most notably large dents in two grain silos. Another aluminum building suffered siding damage and one window was blown out.
EF0	ESE of New Bavaria	Henry	OH	41.1852°N 84.109°W	0355 – 0356	0.04 mi (0.064 km)	25 yd (23 m)	Very brief tornado destroyed a barn, caused minor roof damage to a home, and downed trees before transitioning into a straight-line wind event.
EF1	N of Hamler	Henry	OH	41.2452°N 84.0358°W	0359 – 0401	0.43 mi (0.69 km)	50 yd (46 m)	A barn was destroyed, a soybean field was damaged, and several trees were downed.

=== June 13 event ===
List of confirmed tornadoes – Thursday, June 13, 2013
EF#	Location	County / Parish	State	Start Coord.	Time (UTC)	Path length	Max width	Summary
EF1	SE of Malinta (1st tornado)	Henry	OH	41.2976°N 84.0059°W	0402 – 0403	0.17 mi (0.27 km)	75 yd (69 m)	A barn lost its roof and a house and a detached garage suffered significant damage. The damage to the house included being impacted by a beam from the barn. The top half of a pine tree was thrown 50 feet (15 m) as well.
EF0	SE of Malinta (2nd tornado)	Henry	OH	41.298°N 83.9855°W	0403 – 0404	0.11 mi (0.18 km)	15 yd (14 m)	Very small, brief tornado downed wheat crops in a field. This tornado occurred simultaneously with the following event.
EF0	SE of Malinta (3rd tornado)	Henry	OH	41.3008°N 83.9923°W	0403 – 0404	0.25 mi (0.40 km)	15 yd (14 m)	Very small, brief tornado collapsed the doors and one wall of a pole barn and blew over corn crops. This tornado occurred simultaneously with the previous event.
EF0	E of New Knoxville	Auglaize	OH	40.4975°N 84.2966°W	0403 – 0406	2.32 mi (3.73 km)	50 yd (46 m)	The north side of the administrative building at Neil Armstrong Airport suffered minor damage, sheet metal and tree limbs were deposited on the runway, and six houses and three barns were damaged, with one barn being nearly destroyed. A double-wide mobile home was picked up and tossed 100 feet (30 m) and numerous trees were downed as well.
EF0	W of Custar	Wood	OH	41.2846°N 83.8650°W	0425 – 0427	0.94 mi (1.51 km)	50 yd (46 m)	Two homes and a garage suffered minor roof and door damage and several trees were downed, one of which was thrown 200 feet (61 m) to the northeast. Tornado was embedded in a larger area of straight-line winds.
EF0	SW of Radnor	Delaware	OH	40.361°N 83.182°W	0515 – 0516	0.21 mi (0.34 km)	50 yd (46 m)	Brief tornado destroyed a barn and caused heavy damage to another, with debris being thrown and wrapped around trees along the Scioto River. Some of the cinder-blocks that made up the wall of one barn were moved as well. A small shed was thrown 50 feet (17 yd) and destroyed, corn stalks were thrown about 0.25 mi (0.40 km), and numerous trees were downed.
EF0	WSW of Alsop to NE of Spotsylvania Courthouse	Spotsylvania	VA	38.198°N 77.661°W	1826 – 1833	6.94 mi (11.17 km)	50 yd (46 m)	Tornado downed trees intermittently to the west and north of Spotsylvania Courthouse.
EF0	S of Thornburg	Spotsylvania	VA	38.096°N 77.539°W	1835 – 1840	2.45 mi (3.94 km)	75 yd (69 m)	A shed was destroyed, other sheds suffered roof damage, and a farmhouse sustained minor roof and siding damage along U.S. Highway 1. The tornado then damaged two billboards, crossed Interstate 95, overturned two 8,000 pounds (3,600 kg) RVs at a dealership, and pulled a garage door off of its hinges before dissipating.
EF0	NE of Port Royal to E of Index	King George	VA	38.18°N 77.18°W	1857 – 1906	7.14 mi (11.49 km)	50 yd (46 m)	Intermittent tornado downed numerous trees, including three 20-to-30-inch (51 to 76 cm) in diameter Poplar trees.
EF1	NW of New Market	Jefferson	TN	36.1311°N 83.6315°W	1911 – 1914	2 mi (3.2 km)	120 yd (110 m)	One home sustained roof damage and numerous trees were downed.
EF0	N of Oakley to ENE of California	St. Mary's	MD	38.278°N 76.740°W	1924 – 1942	13.83 mi (22.26 km)	200 yd (180 m)	Weak, intermittent tornado downed many trees, a few of which fell onto other structures.
EF0	W of North Potomac to Burtonsville	Montgomery	MD	39.08°N 77.32°W	1938 – 1959	20.1 mi (32.3 km)	150 yd (140 m)	Weak, but fast moving and long-tracked tornado downed many trees, several of which fell onto more than 14 homes and several vehicles. The forward speed of the tornado exceeded 60 mph (97 km/h).
EF0	E of Broomes Island	Calvert	MD	38.401°N 76.541°W	1942 – 1945	1.8 mi (2.9 km)	75 yd (69 m)	Intermittent tornado downed several trees and damaged an outbuilding.
EF1	ESE of Sevierville	Sevier	TN	35.7919°N 83.3375°W	1955 – 1956	0.5 mi (0.80 km)	150 yd (140 m)	A home lost part of its roof, an awning was removed from a porch, and many trees were downed.
EF1	W of Mount Sterling	Haywood	NC	35.74°N 83.179°W	2010 – 2012	1.88 mi (3.03 km)	100 yd (91 m)	Hundreds of trees were downed just south of Big Creek along the Deep Creek trail within the Great Smoky Mountains National Park (southwest of the Interstate 40 intersection with the NC/TN border and several miles north-northwest of Maggie Valley). The exact start point is unknown, as much of the path was inaccessible, but the park maintenance crew and a survey team from the University of North Carolina at Asheville determined that the tornado may have either touched down near the Tennessee state line or touched down in Tennessee and crossed the state line. A hiker was injured by a fallen tree and was airlifted to a hospital when he was discovered the next day. This was the first documented F/EF1+ tornado on the North Carolina side of the park.
EF1	Canton	Cherokee	GA	34.2662°N 84.5574°W	2300 – 2325	8.5 mi (13.7 km)	75 yd (69 m)	A Chevron gas station had a portion of its roof peeled back and a blown over gas pump and hundreds of trees were downed. Two people were injured.
EF1	S of Woodstock	Cherokee, Cobb, Fulton	GA	34.0783°N 84.5164°W	2330 – 2343	12.93 mi (20.81 km)	200 yd (180 m)	Dozens of trees were downed, many of which fell onto homes. Roofs at apartment buildings were damaged and netting poles at a golf course driving range were damaged as well, with the netting being ripped off and tangled. The tornado crossed the Chattahoochee River near the Morgan Falls Dam.

== See also ==
- June 2012 North American derecho
- Derecho
