= Morgan Township, Franklin County, Iowa =

Morgan Township
- Township
- Location in Franklin County
- Coordinates: 42°41′17″N 93°26′23″W
- Country: United States
- State: Iowa
- County: Franklin

Area
  - Total: 36.17 sq mi (93.69 km^{2})
  - Land: 36.05 sq mi (93.38 km^{2})
  - Water: 0.12 sq mi (0.32 km^{2}) 0.34%
- Elevation: 1,207 ft (368 m)

Population (2010)
  - Total: 265
  - Density: 7.3/sq mi (2.8/km^{2})
- Time zone: UTC-6 (CST)
  - Summer (DST): UTC-5 (CDT)
- ZIP codes: 50071, 50441, 50452
- GNIS feature ID: 0468406

Morgan Township is one of sixteen townships in Franklin County, Iowa, United States. As of the 2010 census, its population was 265 and it contained 148 housing units.

== History ==
Morgan Township was named for Lewis H. Morgan, a pioneer settler and native of Kentucky.

== Geography ==
As of the 2010 census, Morgan Township covered an area of 36.18 square miles (93.7 km^{2}); of this, 36.05 square miles (93.4 km^{2}) (99.66 percent) was land and 0.12 square miles (0.31 km^{2}) (0.34 percent) was water.

=== Cities, towns, villages ===
- Coulter (west edge)
- Dows (east quarter)

=== Cemeteries ===
The township contains Morgan Cemetery, Morgan Township Cemetery, Mount Hope Cemetery and Saint Peter's Lutheran Cemetery.

=== Transportation ===
- Interstate 35

== School districts ==
- CAL Community School District
- Dows Community School District

== Political districts ==
- Iowa's 4th congressional district
- State House District 54
- State Senate District 27
