= Richland Township, Franklin County, Iowa =

Richland Township
- Township
- Location in Franklin County
- Coordinates: 42°51′48″N 93°19′15″W
- Country: United States
- State: Iowa
- County: Franklin

Area
  - Total: 36.64 sq mi (94.89 km^{2})
  - Land: 36.64 sq mi (94.89 km^{2})
  - Water: 0 sq mi (0 km^{2}) 0%
- Elevation: 1,198 ft (365 m)

Population (2010)
  - Total: 219
  - Density: 6.0/sq mi (2.3/km^{2})
- Time zone: UTC-6 (CST)
  - Summer (DST): UTC-5 (CDT)
- ZIP codes: 50441, 50452, 50475, 50479
- GNIS feature ID: 0468604

Richland Township is one of sixteen townships in Franklin County, Iowa, United States. As of the 2010 census, its population was 219 and it contained 99 housing units.

== History ==
Richland Township was organized in 1872.

== Geography ==
As of the 2010 census, Richland Township covered an area of 36.64 square miles (94.9 km^{2}), all land.

=== Cemeteries ===
The township contains Old Chapin Cemetery, Shobes Grove Cemetery and Zion Reformed Cemetery.

=== Transportation ===
- Interstate 35

== School districts ==
- CAL Community School District
- Hampton–Dumont Community School District
- West Fork Community School District

== Political districts ==
- Iowa's 4th congressional district
- State House District 54
- State Senate District 27
