= Wisner Township, Franklin County, Iowa =

Wisner Township
- Township
- Location in Franklin County
- Coordinates: 42°51′50″N 93°26′21″W
- Country: United States
- State: Iowa
- County: Franklin

Area
  - Total: 37.00 sq mi (95.82 km^{2})
  - Land: 37.00 sq mi (95.82 km^{2})
  - Water: 0 sq mi (0 km^{2}) 0%
- Elevation: 1,276 ft (389 m)

Population (2010)
  - Total: 161
  - Density: 4.4/sq mi (1.7/km^{2})
- Time zone: UTC-6 (CST)
  - Summer (DST): UTC-5 (CDT)
- ZIP codes: 50420, 50452, 50457, 50479
- GNIS feature ID: 0469012

Wisner Township is one of sixteen townships in Franklin County, Iowa, United States. As of the 2010 census, its population was 161 and it contained 85 housing units.

== History ==
Wisner Township was created in 1882.

== Geography ==
As of the 2010 census, Wisner Township covered an area of 37 square miles (96 km^{2}), all land.

=== Cemeteries ===
The township contains Holland Cemetery and Meservey Cemetery.

=== Transportation ===
- Iowa Highway 107

== School districts ==
- CAL Community School District
- West Fork Community School District

== Political districts ==
- Iowa's 4th congressional district
- State House District 54
- State Senate District 27
