= Ingham Township, Franklin County, Iowa =

Ingham Township
- Township
- Location in Franklin County
- Coordinates: 42°46′29″N 93°05′05″W
- Country: United States
- State: Iowa
- County: Franklin

Area
  - Total: 36.31 sq mi (94.04 km^{2})
  - Land: 36.30 sq mi (94.01 km^{2})
  - Water: 0.012 sq mi (0.03 km^{2}) 0.03%
- Elevation: 1,040 ft (317 m)

Population (2010)
  - Total: 311
  - Density: 8.5/sq mi (3.3/km^{2})
- Time zone: UTC-6 (CST)
  - Summer (DST): UTC-5 (CDT)
- ZIP codes: 50441, 50605, 50625
- GNIS feature ID: 0468073

Ingham Township is one of sixteen townships in Franklin County, Iowa, United States. As of the 2010 census, its population was 311 and it contained 145 housing units.

== History ==
Ingham Township was organized in 1858. It was named for George H. Ingham, a pioneer settler and native of Ohio.

== Geography ==
As of the 2010 census, Ingham Township covered an area of 36.31 square miles (94.0 km^{2}); of this, 36.3 square miles (94 km^{2}) (99.97 percent) was land and 0.01 square miles (0.026 km^{2}) (0.03 percent) was water.

=== Cities, towns, villages ===
- Hansell

=== Cemeteries ===
The township contains Hansell Cemetery.

=== Transportation ===
- Iowa Highway 3

== School districts ==
- Hampton–Dumont Community School District

== Political districts ==
- Iowa's 4th congressional district
- State House District 54
- State Senate District 27
