= Reeve Township =

Reeve Township may refer to the following places in the United States:

- Reeve Township, Daviess County, Indiana
- Reeve Township, Franklin County, Iowa
