= Oakland, Franklin County, Iowa =

Oakland, Iowa
- Unincorporated community
- Location within Iowa
- Coordinates: 42°34′52″N 93°26′36″W
- Country: United States
- State: Iowa
- County: Franklin
- Elevation: 1,125 ft (343 m)
- Time zone: UTC-6 (Central (CST))
  - Summer (DST): UTC-5 (CDT)
- Area code: 641
- GNIS feature ID: 464677

Oakland is an unincorporated community in Oakland Township, Franklin County, Iowa, United States. Oakland is located along county highways C70 and S21, 1.2 miles (1.9 km) southwest of Popejoy.
