= Mott Township, Franklin County, Iowa =

Mott Township
- Township
- Location in Franklin County
- Coordinates: 42°46′42″N 93°12′09″W
- Country: United States
- State: Iowa
- County: Franklin

Area
  - Total: 32.76 sq mi (84.85 km^{2})
  - Land: 32.57 sq mi (84.36 km^{2})
  - Water: 0.19 sq mi (0.49 km^{2}) 0.58%
- Elevation: 1,109 ft (338 m)

Population (2010)
  - Total: 498
  - Density: 15/sq mi (5.9/km^{2})
- Time zone: UTC-6 (CST)
  - Summer (DST): UTC-5 (CDT)
- ZIP codes: 50441, 50475
- GNIS feature ID: 0468413

Mott Township is one of sixteen townships in Franklin County, Iowa, United States. As of the 2010 census, its population was 498 and it contained 237 housing units.

== History ==
Mott Township was organized in 1879. The Mott family were prominent landowners.

== Geography ==
As of the 2010 census, Mott Township covered an area of 32.76 square miles (84.8 km^{2}); of this, 32.57 square miles (84.4 km^{2}) (99.42 percent) was land and 0.19 square miles (0.49 km^{2}) (0.58 percent) was water.

=== Cemeteries ===
The township contains Trinity Cemetery.

=== Transportation ===
- Iowa Highway 3
- U.S. Route 65

== School districts ==
- Hampton–Dumont Community School District

== Political districts ==
- Iowa's 4th congressional district
- State House District 54
- State Senate District 27
