= Burdette, Iowa =

- Unincorporated community
- Location within Iowa
- Coordinates: 42°34′19″N 93°21′37″W
- Country: United States
- State: Iowa
- County: Franklin
- Elevation: 1,168 ft (356 m)
- Time zone: UTC-6 (Central (CST))
  - Summer (DST): UTC-5 (CDT)
- Area code: 641
- GNIS feature ID: 464481

Burdette is an unincorporated community in Lee Township, Franklin County, Iowa, United States. Burdette is located at the intersection of Heather Avenue and 30th Street, 3.7 miles (6.0 km) east-southeast of Popejoy.

== History ==
Burdette's population was 20 in 1925. The population was 43 in 1940.
