= Iowa Highway 107 =

Former state highway in Iowa, United States

Iowa Highway 107
- Iowa 107 highlighted in red

Route information
- Maintained by Iowa State Highway Commission
- Length: 32.22 mi (51.85 km)
- Existed: 1920–June 30, 2011

Major junctions
- South end: Iowa 3 south of Alexander
- North end: US 18 in Clear Lake

Location
- Country: United States
- State: Iowa
- Counties: Franklin; Cerro Gordo

Highway system
- Iowa Primary Highway System; Interstate; US; State; Secondary; Scenic
← Iowa 105	→ Iowa 110

Iowa Highway 107 (Iowa 107) was a 32-mile-long (51 km) state highway in north central Iowa. It began south of Alexander at an intersection with Iowa 3 and ended at U.S. Route 18 (US 18) in Clear Lake. The highway was designated in 1920 as a spur route connecting Thornton to US 18, then Primary Road No. 19 (PR No. 19). After Interstate 35 (I-35) was completed through northern Iowa, Iowa 107's role in the primary highway system began to diminish. Portions of the route were removed from the system altogether. In 2003, the majority of the route was turned over to Franklin and Cerro Gordo counties. The only remaining segments were 1 mile (1.6 km) and 1 1/2 miles (2.4 km) in length, each segment wholly within the city limits of Meservey and Thornton. After it was discovered that the two segments were still being maintained by the Iowa Department of Transportation, the two communities were asked to accept jurisdiction of the segments. The City of Meservey accepted its section in 2010, and the City of Thornton accepted its section on June 30, 2011.

== Route description ==
Iowa 107 began at an intersection with Iowa 3 three miles (4.8 km) south of Alexander. From Iowa 3, the highway passed through Alexander, continued north along a flat area of northwestern Franklin County. At Meservey, Iowa 107 crossed into Cerro Gordo County. One mile (1.6 km) north of Meservey, the highway turned east towards Thornton, splitting from County Road S14 (CR S14). The route's east–west jaunt was 5 1/2 miles (8.9 km) long. At Thornton, the route turned north again.

North of Thornton, Iowa 107 followed a straight highway that traveled over gently rolling hills and only passed a few houses until it reached Clear Lake. At the southern city limit, it intersected CR B35. When the route was nearly removed from the primary highway system in 2003, CR B35 served as the northern end of the route. In Clear Lake, the route skirted the downtown area to east before ending at US 18.

== History ==
Designated in 1920, Iowa 107 originally was a spur highway connecting Thornton to Primary Road No. 19, now U.S. Route 18 in Clear Lake. In 1935, 107 was extended west and south through Meservey and Alexander to Primary Road 10, now Iowa Highway 3. Between 1935 and 1987, Iowa 107 was a 32-mile-long (51 km) highway. In 1987, the portion of Iowa 107 within Clear Lake's city limits was turned over to the city. Signs on US 18 in Clear Lake were changed to say To Iowa 107.

On December 30, 2002, the Cerro Gordo County Board of Supervisors agreed to accept jurisdiction of the portion of Iowa 107 in rural Cerro Gordo County. The Iowa Department of Transportation accepted the transfer on February 18, 2003. The towns of Meservey and Thornton did not accept jurisdictional transfer of Iowa 107. In April 2003, the Iowa DOT drafted a report which identified roadways, including the Franklin County portion of Iowa 107, that would make a more efficient use of Iowa's Road Use Tax Fund if they were classified as secondary roads. Over 600 miles of roads, including the Franklin County portion of Iowa 107 was turned over to local jurisdictions on July 1, 2003.

In early 2010, the Cerro Gordo County Engineer sent letters of inquiry to the cities of Meservey and Thornton regarding their interest in taking over their segments of Iowa 107. The City of Meservey immediately accepted control of its section. The City of Thornton accepted the transfer of jurisdiction on June 30, 2011.

== Major intersections ==
County	Location	mi	km	Destinations	Notes
Franklin	Scott Township	0.00	0.00	Iowa 3	
Cerro Gordo	Grimes Township	13.06	21.02	CR S14	
Cerro Gordo	Clear Lake	30.03	48.33	CR B35	
Cerro Gordo	Clear Lake	32.22	51.85	US 18	
1.000 mi = 1.609 km; 1.000 km = 0.621 mi
