= EGHS =

EGHS may refer to:

- Eagle Grove High School, Eagle Grove, Iowa, United States
- East Gadsden High School, Gadsden County, Florida, United States
- East Gaston High School, Mount Holly, North Carolina, United States
- East Greenwich High School, East Greenwich, Rhode Island, United States
- Eastern Guilford High School, Gibsonville, North Carolina, United States
- Eau Gallie High School, Melbourne, Florida, United States
- Elk Grove High School (Elk Grove, California), United States
- Elk Grove High School (Elk Grove Village, Illinois), United States
