= West Fork Township, Franklin County, Iowa =

West Fork Township
- Township
- Location in Franklin County
- Coordinates: 42°51′48″N 93°05′03″W
- Country: United States
- State: Iowa
- County: Franklin

Area
  - Total: 36.65 sq mi (94.93 km^{2})
  - Land: 36.65 sq mi (94.93 km^{2})
  - Water: 0 sq mi (0 km^{2}) 0%
- Elevation: 1,040 ft (317 m)

Population (2010)
  - Total: 143
  - Density: 3.9/sq mi (1.5/km^{2})
- Time zone: UTC-6 (CST)
  - Summer (DST): UTC-5 (CDT)
- ZIP codes: 50433, 50441, 50475, 50605
- GNIS feature ID: 0468977

West Fork Township is one of sixteen townships in Franklin County, Iowa, United States. As of the 2010 census, its population was 143 and it contained 77 housing units.

== History ==
West Fork Township was created in 1868. It is named from the west fork of the Cedar River.

== Geography ==
As of the 2010 census, West Fork Township covered an area of 36.65 square miles (94.9 km^{2}), all land.

=== Cemeteries ===
The township contains West Fork Cemetery.

== School districts ==
- Hampton–Dumont Community School District
- West Fork Community School District

== Political districts ==
- Iowa's 4th congressional district
- State House District 54
- State Senate District 27
