= Alden School District =

Alden School District may refer to:

- Alden Community School District - Iowa
- Alden Central School District - New York
