= Geneva Township, Franklin County, Iowa =

Geneva Township
- Township
- Location in Franklin County
- Coordinates: 42°41′14″N 93°05′06″W
- Country: United States
- State: Iowa
- County: Franklin

Area
  - Total: 36.13 sq mi (93.57 km^{2})
  - Land: 36.04 sq mi (93.34 km^{2})
  - Water: 0.089 sq mi (0.23 km^{2}) 0.24%
- Elevation: 1,063 ft (324 m)

Population (2010)
  - Total: 324
  - Density: 9.1/sq mi (3.5/km^{2})
- Time zone: UTC-6 (CST)
  - Summer (DST): UTC-5 (CDT)
- ZIP codes: 50601, 50625, 50633
- GNIS feature ID: 0467906

Geneva Township is one of sixteen townships in Franklin County, Iowa, United States. As of the 2010 census, its population was 324 and it contained 155 housing units.

== History ==
Geneva Township was created in 1858.

== Geography ==
As of the 2010 census, Geneva Township covered an area of 36.13 square miles (93.6 km^{2}); of this, 36.04 square miles (93.3 km^{2}) (99.76 percent) was land and 0.09 square miles (0.23 km^{2}) (0.24 percent) was water.

=== Cities, towns, villages ===
- Geneva

=== Cemeteries ===
The township contains Fourmile Grove Cemetery and Lindenwood Cemetery.

== School districts ==
- AGWSR Community School District
- Hampton–Dumont Community School District

== Political districts ==
- Iowa's 4th congressional district
- State House District 54
- State Senate District 27
