= Ross Township, Franklin County, Iowa =

Ross Township
- Township
- Location in Franklin County
- Coordinates: 42°51′29″N 93°12′05″W
- Country: United States
- State: Iowa
- County: Franklin

Area
  - Total: 31.34 sq mi (81.16 km^{2})
  - Land: 31.34 sq mi (81.16 km^{2})
  - Water: 0 sq mi (0 km^{2}) 0%
- Elevation: 1,086 ft (331 m)

Population (2010)
  - Total: 303
  - Density: 9.6/sq mi (3.7/km^{2})
- Time zone: UTC-6 (CST)
  - Summer (DST): UTC-5 (CDT)
- ZIP codes: 50441, 50475
- GNIS feature ID: 0468643

Ross Township is one of sixteen townships in Franklin County, Iowa, United States. As of the 2010 census, its population was 303 and it contained 131 housing units.

== History ==
Ross Township was organized in 1879. It was named for Abner S. Ross, an early settler.

== Geography ==
As of the 2010 census, Ross Township covered an area of 31.34 square miles (81.2 km^{2}), all land.

=== Cities, towns, villages ===
- Chapin

=== Cemeteries ===
The township contains Saint John Zion Cemetery and Way Side Cemetery.

=== Transportation ===
- U.S. Route 65

== School districts ==
- Hampton–Dumont Community School District
- West Fork Community School District

== Political districts ==
- Iowa's 4th congressional district
- State House District 54
- State Senate District 27
