= Karson Sharar =

American football player (born 2003)

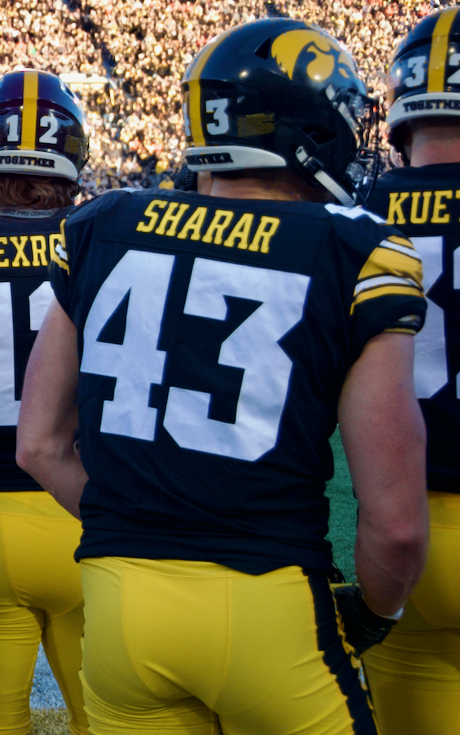
- Sharar with Iowa in 2023

No. 43 – Arizona Cardinals
- Position: Inside linebacker
- Roster status: Active

Personal information
- Born: March 7, 2003 (age 23)
- Listed height: 6 ft 1 in (1.85 m)
- Listed weight: 231 lb (105 kg)

Career information
- High school: Iowa Falls-Alden (Iowa Falls, Iowa)
- College: Iowa (2021–2025)
- NFL draft: 2026: 6th round, 183rd overall pick

Career history
- Arizona Cardinals (2026–present)

Career NFL statistics as of Week 4, 2026
- Tackles: 5
- Stats at Pro Football Reference

Karson Sharar (born March 7, 2003) is an American professional football inside linebacker for the Arizona Cardinals of the National Football League (NFL). He played college football for the Iowa Hawkeyes and was selected by the Cardinals in the sixth round of the 2026 NFL draft.

== Early life ==
Sharar attended Iowa Falls-Alden High School in Iowa Falls, Iowa, and committed to play college football for the Iowa Hawkeyes.

== College career ==
As a freshman in 2021, Sharar played in four games, using the season to redshirt. In 2022, he played in seven games before suffering a season-ending injury. During the 2023 and 2024 season, Sharar combined to play in 24 games, notching 20 tackles with one and a half being for a loss, and a fumble recovery. In week 13 of the 2025 season, Sharar notched ten tackles with three being for a loss, and a sack in a victory over Michigan State Spartans. He finished his 2025 season with 83 tackles with 12 going for a loss, four sacks, a forced fumble, and a pass deflection. After the conclusion of the 2025 season, Sharar declared for the 2026 NFL draft. He was invited to participate in the 2026 NFL scouting combine.

== Professional career ==
Pre-draft measurables
Height	Weight	Arm length	Hand span	Wingspan	40-yard dash	10-yard split	20-yard split	20-yard shuttle	Three-cone drill	Vertical jump	Broad jump	Bench press
6 ft 1 1/2 in (1.87 m)	231 lb (105 kg)	31 1/8 in (0.79 m)	10 1/8 in (0.26 m)	6 ft 4 1/4 in (1.94 m)	4.56 s	1.59 s	2.65 s	4.20 s	6.98 s	40.0 in (1.02 m)	10 ft 3 in (3.12 m)	13 reps
All values from NFL Combine/Pro Day

Sharar was drafted by the Arizona Cardinals in the 6th round with the 183rd overall pick of the 2026 NFL Draft.
