= Osceola Township, Franklin County, Iowa =

Osceola Township
- Township
- Location in Franklin County
- Coordinates: 42°36′00″N 93°05′08″W
- Country: United States
- State: Iowa
- County: Franklin

Area
  - Total: 35.87 sq mi (92.91 km^{2})
  - Land: 35.8 sq mi (92.8 km^{2})
  - Water: 0.042 sq mi (0.11 km^{2}) 0.11%
- Elevation: 1,132 ft (345 m)

Population (2010)
  - Total: 268
  - Density: 7.5/sq mi (2.9/km^{2})
- Time zone: UTC-6 (CST)
  - Summer (DST): UTC-5 (CDT)
- ZIP codes: 50601, 50633
- GNIS feature ID: 0468479

Osceola Township is one of sixteen townships in Franklin County, Iowa, United States. As of the 2010 census, its population was 268 and it contained 129 housing units.

== History ==
Osceola Township was created in 1857.

== Geography ==
As of the 2010 census, Osceola Township covered an area of 35.87 square miles (92.9 km^{2}); of this, 35.83 square miles (92.8 km^{2}) (99.89 percent) was land and 0.04 square miles (0.10 km^{2}) (0.11 percent) was water.

=== Cities, towns, villages ===
- Ackley (north quarter)

=== Unincorporated towns ===
- Faulkner at 42.6152547°N 93.0860330°W

(This list is based on USGS data and may include former settlements.)

=== Cemeteries ===
The township contains Oak Wood Cemetery, Pleasant Hill Cemetery and Saint Marys Cemetery.

=== Transportation ===
- Iowa Highway 57

== School districts ==
- AGWSR Community School District

== Political districts ==
- Iowa's 4th congressional district
- State House District 54
- State Senate District 27
