= Faulkner, Iowa =

- Unincorporated community
- Location within Iowa
- Coordinates: 42°36′55″N 93°05′10″W
- Country: United States
- State: Iowa
- County: Franklin
- Elevation: 1,109 ft (338 m)
- Time zone: UTC-6 (Central (CST))
  - Summer (DST): UTC-5 (CDT)
- Area code: 641
- GNIS feature ID: 456560

Faulkner is an unincorporated community in Osceola Township, Franklin County, Iowa, United States. Faulkner is located along county highways C55 and S56, 4.5 miles (7.2 km) north-northwest of Ackley.

== History ==
Founded in the 1800s, Faulkner's population was 16 in 1902, and 54 in 1925. The population was 54 in 1940.
