= Reeve Township, Franklin County, Iowa =

Reeve Township
- Township
- Location in Franklin County
- Coordinates: 42°41′12″N 93°12′09″W
- Country: United States
- State: Iowa
- County: Franklin

Area
  - Total: 35.59 sq mi (92.17 km^{2})
  - Land: 35.59 sq mi (92.17 km^{2})
  - Water: 0 sq mi (0 km^{2}) 0%
- Elevation: 1,180 ft (360 m)

Population (2010)
  - Total: 262
  - Density: 7.3/sq mi (2.8/km^{2})
- Time zone: UTC-6 (CST)
  - Summer (DST): UTC-5 (CDT)
- ZIP codes: 50441, 50633
- GNIS feature ID: 0468595

Reeve Township is one of sixteen townships in Franklin County, Iowa, United States. As of the 2010 census, its population was 262 and it contained 135 housing units.

== History ==
Reeve Township was organized in 1855. It was named for J. B. Reeve, a pioneer settler.

== Geography ==
As of the 2010 census, Reeve Township covered an area of 35.59 square miles (92.2 km^{2}), all land.

=== Unincorporated towns ===
- Reeve at 42.6721974°N 93.2604804°W

(This list is based on USGS data and may include former settlements.)

=== Cemeteries ===
The township contains Maynes Grove Cemetery, Maysville Cemetery, Redding Cemetery and Towle Cemetery.

=== Transportation ===
- U.S. Route 65

== School districts ==
- AGWSR Community School District
- Hampton–Dumont Community School District

== Political districts ==
- Iowa's 4th congressional district
- State House District 54
- State Senate District 27
