= Bradford, Franklin County, Iowa =

Bradford, Iowa
- Census-designated place
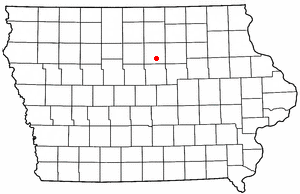
- Location of Bradford, Iowa
- Coordinates: 42°37′59″N 93°14′42″W
- Country: United States
- State: Iowa
- County: Franklin

Area
  - Total: 0.93 sq mi (2.41 km^{2})
  - Land: 0.93 sq mi (2.41 km^{2})
  - Water: 0 sq mi (0.00 km^{2})
- Elevation: 1,253 ft (382 m)

Population (2020)
  - Total: 84
  - Density: 90.4/sq mi (34.89/km^{2})
- Time zone: UTC-6 (Central (CST))
  - Summer (DST): UTC-5 (CDT)
- Area code: 641
- FIPS code: 19-08020
- GNIS feature ID: 2585467

Bradford is an unincorporated community and census-designated place (CDP) in Franklin County, Iowa, United States. Its population was 84 as of the 2020 census.

Bradford was platted in 1906.

The population was 100 in 1940.

== Demographics ==
Historical population
Census	Pop.	Note	%±
2010	99		—
2020	84		−15.2%
U.S. Decennial Census

=== 2020 census ===
As of the census of 2020, there were 84 people, 32 households, and 13 families residing in the community. The population density was 90.4 inhabitants per square mile (34.9/km^{2}). There were 53 housing units at an average density of 57.0 per square mile (22.0/km^{2}). The racial makeup of the community was 98.8% White, 0.0% Black or African American, 0.0% Native American, 0.0% Asian, 0.0% Pacific Islander, 1.2% from other races and 0.0% from two or more races. Hispanic or Latino persons of any race comprised 1.2% of the population.

Of the 32 households, 15.6% of which had children under the age of 18 living with them, 34.4% were married couples living together, 6.2% were cohabitating couples, 18.8% had a female householder with no spouse or partner present and 40.6% had a male householder with no spouse or partner present. 59.4% of all households were non-families. 53.1% of all households were made up of individuals, 34.4% had someone living alone who was 65 years old or older.

The median age in the community was 46.0 years. 15.5% of the residents were under the age of 20; 2.4% were between the ages of 20 and 24; 28.6% were from 25 and 44; 25.0% were from 45 and 64; and 28.6% were 65 years of age or older. The gender makeup of the community was 73.8% male and 26.2% female.
