= Eagle Grove High School =

Public secondary school in Eagle Grove, Iowa, United States

Eagle Grove Community School District

Location
- 415 NW 2nd Avenue; Eagle Grove, Iowa 50533; 42.666°N 93.906°W

Information
- Type: Public secondary school
- Established: 1800
- School district: Eagle Grove Community School District
- Principal: Radney Roosa
- Faculty: 25.31 FTE
- Grades: 9-12
- Campus: Rural
- Colors: Purple & Gold
- Athletics conference: North Central Conference (Iowa)
- Mascot: Eagle
- Nickname: Eagles
- Website: www.eaglegrove.school/high-school/

Eagle Grove High School is a rural public high school located in Eagle Grove, Iowa. It is part of the Eagle Grove Community School District.

== Overview ==
The school district is the largest district in Wright county and draws students from the towns of Eagle Grove, Thor, Vincent, Woolstock, and surrounding areas in Iowa.

The mascot of Eagle Grove High School (EGHS) is the eagle, and school colors are purple and gold. The school song is set to the tune of the Notre Dame Victory March.

Notable clubs at this school include Future Business Leaders of America (FBLA), Spanish Club, Fellowship of Christian Athletes (FCA), Future Farmers of America (FFA), National Honor Society (NHS), Student Council, and others.

== Athletics ==
The Eagles participate in the North Central Conference (Iowa) in the following sports:

- Football
- Cross Country
  - Boys' 2-time Class 2A State Champions (1984, 1987)
- Volleyball
- Basketball
- Wrestling
  - Boys' 3-time State Champions (1974, 1986, 1987)
- Track and Field
- Baseball
  - 2002 Class 2A State Champions
- Softball
- Esports

== See also ==
- List of high schools in Iowa
