= Hansell, Iowa =

- City
- Location of Hansell, Iowa
- Coordinates: 42°45′28″N 93°06′15″W
- Country: USA
- State: Iowa
- County: Franklin

Area
  - Total: 0.22 sq mi (0.58 km^{2})
  - Land: 0.22 sq mi (0.58 km^{2})
  - Water: 0 sq mi (0.00 km^{2})
- Elevation: 1,034 ft (315 m)

Population (2020)
  - Total: 82
  - Density: 364.7/sq mi (140.81/km^{2})
- Time zone: UTC-6 (Central (CST))
  - Summer (DST): UTC-5 (CDT)
- ZIP code: 50441
- Area code: 641
- FIPS code: 19-34365
- GNIS feature ID: 2394290

Hansell is a city in Franklin County, Iowa, United States. The population was 82 at the time of the 2020 census.

== History ==
Hansell was platted in 1880. It was named by its founders, George W. Hansell and his wife, Laura B. Hansell.

== Geography ==
According to the United States Census Bureau, the city has a total area of 0.23 square miles (0.60 km^{2}), all land.

== Demographics ==
Historical populations
Year	Pop.	±%
1920	163	—
1930	172	+5.5%
1940	183	+6.4%
1950	190	+3.8%
1960	168	−11.6%
1970	124	−26.2%
1980	138	+11.3%
1990	83	−39.9%
2000	96	+15.7%
2010	98	+2.1%
2020	82	−16.3%
Source:"U.S. Census website". United States Census Bureau. and Iowa Data Center; Source: U.S. Decennial Census

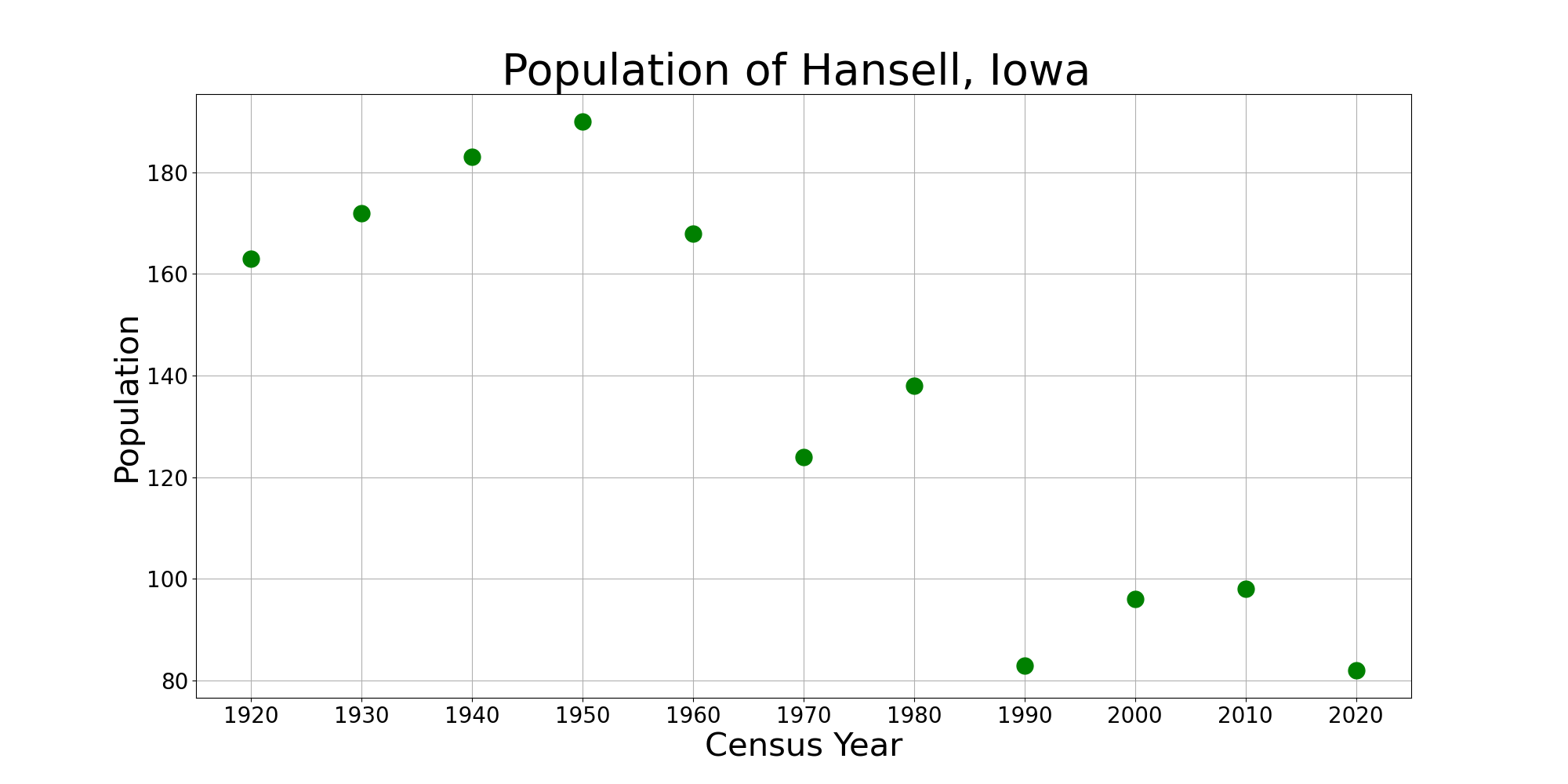
The population of Hansell, Iowa from US census data

=== 2020 census ===
As of the census of 2020, there were 82 people, 41 households, and 26 families residing in the city. The population density was 365.8 inhabitants per square mile (141.2/km^{2}). There were 44 housing units at an average density of 196.3 per square mile (75.8/km^{2}). The racial makeup of the city was 95.1% White, 0.0% Black or African American, 2.4% Native American, 1.2% Asian, 0.0% Pacific Islander, 0.0% from other races and 1.2% from two or more races. Hispanic or Latino persons of any race comprised 4.9% of the population.

Of the 41 households, 46.3% of which had children under the age of 18 living with them, 48.8% were married couples living together, 9.8% were cohabitating couples, 24.4% had a female householder with no spouse or partner present and 17.1% had a male householder with no spouse or partner present. 36.6% of all households were non-families. 31.7% of all households were made up of individuals, 9.8% had someone living alone who was 65 years old or older.

The median age in the city was 46.5 years. 20.7% of the residents were under the age of 20; 4.9% were between the ages of 20 and 24; 24.4% were from 25 and 44; 20.7% were from 45 and 64; and 29.3% were 65 years of age or older. The gender makeup of the city was 52.4% male and 47.6% female.

=== 2010 census ===
As of the census of 2010, there were 98 people, 48 households, and 29 families living in the city. The population density was 426.1 inhabitants per square mile (164.5/km^{2}). There were 52 housing units at an average density of 226.1 per square mile (87.3/km^{2}). The racial makeup of the city was 99.0% White and 1.0% Asian.

There were 48 households, of which 18.8% had children under the age of 18 living with them, 54.2% were married couples living together, 4.2% had a female householder with no husband present, 2.1% had a male householder with no wife present, and 39.6% were non-families. 29.2% of all households were made up of individuals, and 14.6% had someone living alone who was 65 years of age or older. The average household size was 2.04 and the average family size was 2.55.

The median age in the city was 50.5 years. 14.3% of residents were under the age of 18; 9.2% were between the ages of 18 and 24; 18.4% were from 25 to 44; 32.6% were from 45 to 64; and 25.5% were 65 years of age or older. The gender makeup of the city was 48.0% male and 52.0% female.

=== 2000 census ===
As of the census of 2000, there were 96 people, 42 households, and 27 families living in the city. The population density was 441.8 inhabitants per square mile (170.6/km^{2}). There were 46 housing units at an average density of 211.7 per square mile (81.7/km^{2}). The racial makeup of the city was 97.92% White, 2.08% from other races. Hispanic or Latino of any race were 3.12% of the population.

There were 42 households, out of which 21.4% had children under the age of 18 living with them, 59.5% were married couples living together, 2.4% had a female householder with no husband present, and 35.7% were non-families. 28.6% of all households were made up of individuals, and 16.7% had someone living alone who was 65 years of age or older. The average household size was 2.29 and the average family size was 2.85.

In the city, the population was spread out, with 19.8% under the age of 18, 9.4% from 18 to 24, 27.1% from 25 to 44, 31.3% from 45 to 64, and 12.5% who were 65 years of age or older. The median age was 42 years. For every 100 females, there were 88.2 males. For every 100 females age 18 and over, there were 97.4 males.

The median income for a household in the city was $32,250, and the median income for a family was $47,500. Males had a median income of $31,250 versus $23,750 for females. The per capita income for the city was $17,389. There were 13.9% of families and 12.3% of the population living below the poverty line, including no under eighteens and 12.0% of those over 64.

== Education ==
Hampton–Dumont Community School District operates the area public schools. It was established on July 1, 1995, by the merger of the Dumont and Hampton school districts.
