= Alexander, Iowa =

- City
- Location of Alexander, Iowa
- Coordinates: 42°48′16″N 93°28′43″W
- Country: USA
- State: Iowa
- County: Franklin

Area
  - Total: 4.27 sq mi (11.05 km^{2})
  - Land: 4.27 sq mi (11.05 km^{2})
  - Water: 0 sq mi (0.00 km^{2})
- Elevation: 1,257 ft (383 m)

Population (2020)
  - Total: 164
  - Density: 38.4/sq mi (14.84/km^{2})
- Time zone: UTC-6 (Central (CST))
  - Summer (DST): UTC-5 (CDT)
- ZIP code: 50420
- Area code: 641
- FIPS code: 19-01090
- GNIS feature ID: 2393915
- Website: cityofalexander-iowa.com

Alexander is a city in Franklin County, Iowa, United States. The population was 164 at the 2020 census.

== History ==
Alexander was platted in 1885, not long after the Central Railroad of Iowa had been built through the territory.

== Geography ==
According to the United States Census Bureau, the city has a total area of 4.27 square miles (11.06 km^{2}), all land.

== Demographics ==
Historical populations
| Year | Pop. | ±% |
|---|---|---|
| 1910 | 262 | — |
| 1920 | 315 | +20.2% |
| 1930 | 334 | +6.0% |
| 1940 | 324 | −3.0% |
| 1950 | 278 | −14.2% |
| 1960 | 294 | +5.8% |
| 1970 | 249 | −15.3% |
| 1980 | 190 | −23.7% |
| 1990 | 170 | −10.5% |
| 2000 | 165 | −2.9% |
| 2010 | 175 | +6.1% |
| 2020 | 164 | −6.3% |
Source:"U.S. Census website". United States Census Bureau. and Iowa Data Center; Source: U.S. Decennial Census

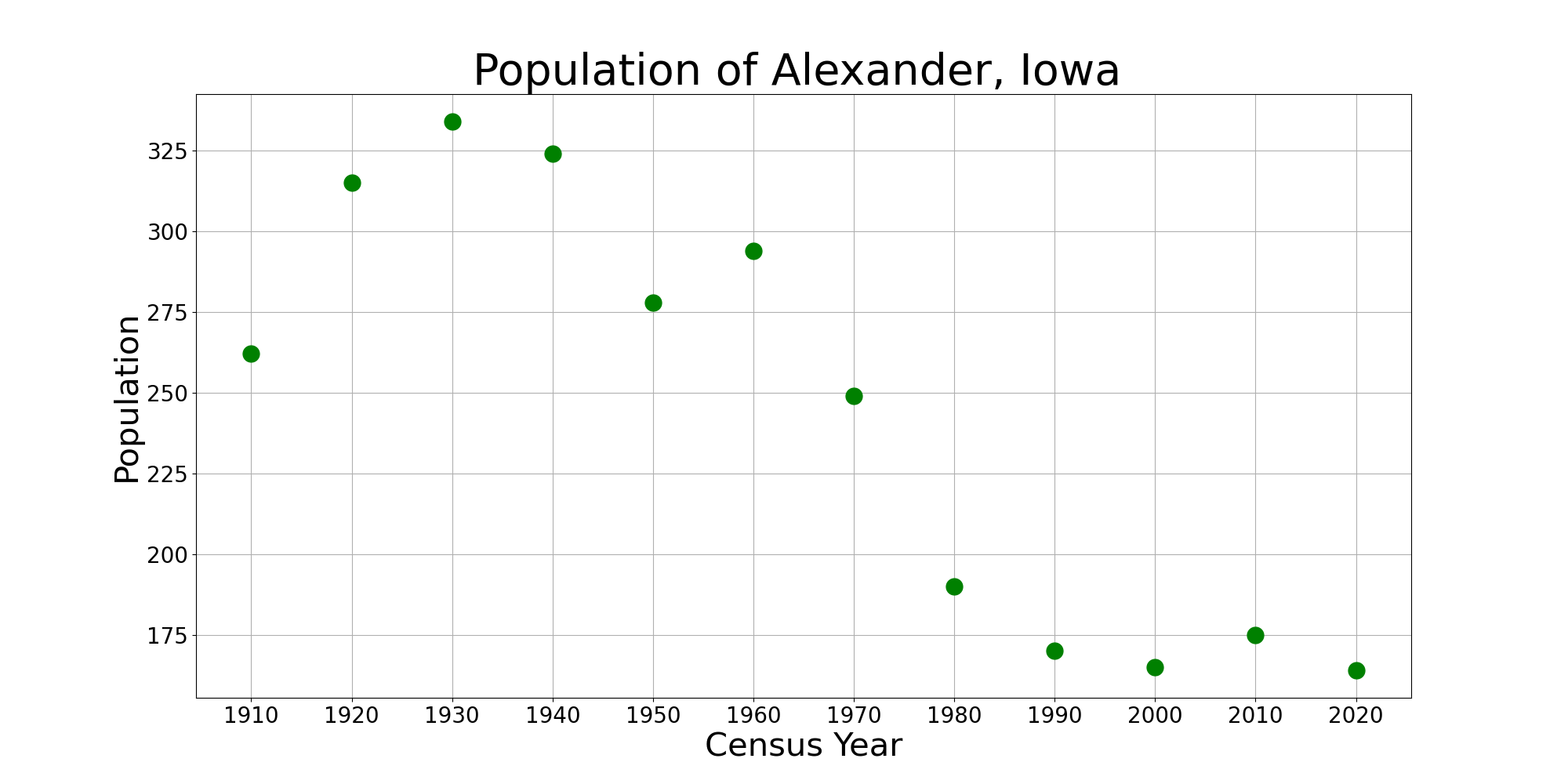
The population of Alexander, Iowa from US census data

=== 2020 census ===
As of the census of 2020, there were 164 people, 60 households, and 40 families residing in the city. The population density was 38.4 inhabitants per square mile (14.8/km^{2}). There were 79 housing units at an average density of 18.5 per square mile (7.1/km^{2}). The racial makeup of the city was 82.3% White, 0.0% Black or African American, 0.0% Native American, 1.8% Asian, 0.0% Pacific Islander, 4.9% from other races and 11.0% from two or more races. Hispanic or Latino persons of any race comprised 17.7% of the population.

Of the 60 households, 30.0% of which had children under the age of 18 living with them, 50.0% were married couples living together, 6.7% were cohabitating couples, 16.7% had a female householder with no spouse or partner present and 26.7% had a male householder with no spouse or partner present. 33.3% of all households were non-families. 28.3% of all households were made up of individuals, 8.3% had someone living alone who was 65 years old or older.

The median age in the city was 37.0 years. 28.0% of the residents were under the age of 20; 9.8% were between the ages of 20 and 24; 23.2% were from 25 and 44; 28.7% were from 45 and 64; and 10.4% were 65 years of age or older. The gender makeup of the city was 53.7% male and 46.3% female.

=== 2010 census ===
As of the census of 2010, there were 175 people, 70 households, and 50 families living in the city. The population density was 41.0 inhabitants per square mile (15.8/km^{2}). There were 86 housing units at an average density of 20.1 per square mile (7.8/km^{2}). The racial makeup of the city was 96.0% White, 0.6% Native American, 1.7% from other races, and 1.7% from two or more races. Hispanic or Latino of any race were 6.9% of the population.

There were 70 households, of which 37.1% had children under the age of 18 living with them, 57.1% were married couples living together, 8.6% had a female householder with no husband present, 5.7% had a male householder with no wife present, and 28.6% were non-families. 24.3% of all households were made up of individuals, and 17.1% had someone living alone who was 65 years of age or older. The average household size was 2.50 and the average family size was 2.88.

The median age in the city was 34.8 years. 29.7% of residents were under the age of 18; 5.1% were between the ages of 18 and 24; 24.6% were from 25 to 44; 25.2% were from 45 to 64; and 15.4% were 65 years of age or older. The gender makeup of the city was 47.4% male and 52.6% female.

=== 2000 census ===
As of the census of 2000, there were 165 people, 79 households, and 48 families living in the city. The population density was 38.6 inhabitants per square mile (14.9/km^{2}). There were 88 housing units at an average density of 20.6 per square mile (7.9/km^{2}). The racial makeup of the city was 96.36% White, 3.64% from other races. Hispanic or Latino of any race were 3.64% of the population.

There were 79 households, out of which 24.1% had children under the age of 18 living with them, 55.7% were married couples living together, 3.8% had a female householder with no husband present, and 38.0% were non-families. 35.4% of all households were made up of individuals, and 27.8% had someone living alone who was 65 years of age or older. The average household size was 2.09 and the average family size was 2.59.

Age spread: 17.0% under the age of 18, 7.3% from 18 to 24, 24.2% from 25 to 44, 24.8% from 45 to 64, and 26.7% who were 65 years of age or older. The median age was 46 years. For every 100 females, there were 87.5 males. For every 100 females age 18 and over, there were 95.7 males.

The median income for a household in the city was $31,250, and the median income for a family was $33,750. Males had a median income of $27,344 versus $20,833 for females. The per capita income for the city was $14,995. About 6.3% of families and 9.3% of the population were below the poverty line, including none of those under the age of eighteen and 11.3% of those 65 or over.

== Education ==
The CAL Community School District operates public schools.

== Notable people ==
- Alexander is the hometown of Iowa Congressman Tom Latham who served from 1995 to 2015.
