= Latimer, Iowa =

- City
- Location of Latimer, Iowa
- Coordinates: 42°45′40″N 93°22′20″W
- Country: USA
- State: Iowa
- County: Franklin

Area
  - Total: 2.41 sq mi (6.23 km^{2})
  - Land: 2.41 sq mi (6.23 km^{2})
  - Water: 0 sq mi (0.00 km^{2})
- Elevation: 1,237 ft (377 m)

Population (2020)
  - Total: 477
  - Density: 198.4/sq mi (76.62/km^{2})
- Time zone: UTC-6 (Central (CST))
  - Summer (DST): UTC-5 (CDT)
- ZIP code: 50452
- Area code: 641
- FIPS code: 19-43590
- GNIS feature ID: 2395640
- Website: latimeriowa.com

Latimer is a city in Franklin County, Iowa, United States. The population was 477 at the time of the 2020 census.

== History ==
Latimer got its start in the year 1882, following construction of the Iowa Central railroad through that territory. It was named for its founder, J. F. Latimer.

== Geography ==
According to the United States Census Bureau, the city has a total area of 2.40 square miles (6.22 km^{2}), all land.

== Demographics ==
Historical populations
Year	Pop.	±%
1910	378	—
1920	359	−5.0%
1930	352	−1.9%
1940	416	+18.2%
1950	434	+4.3%
1960	445	+2.5%
1970	393	−11.7%
1980	441	+12.2%
1990	430	−2.5%
2000	535	+24.4%
2010	507	−5.2%
2020	477	−5.9%
Source:"U.S. Census website". United States Census Bureau. and Iowa Data Center; Source: U.S. Decennial Census

=== 2020 census ===
As of the census of 2020, there were 477 people, 191 households, and 118 families residing in the city. The population density was 194.5 inhabitants per square mile (75.1/km^{2}). There were 215 housing units at an average density of 87.7 per square mile (33.9/km^{2}). The racial makeup of the city was 70.4% White, 0.0% Black or African American, 2.9% Native American, 0.0% Asian, 0.0% Pacific Islander, 16.4% from other races and 10.3% from two or more races. Hispanic or Latino persons of any race comprised 35.8% of the population.

Of the 191 households, 35.6% of which had children under the age of 18 living with them, 48.7% were married couples living together, 8.4% were cohabiting couples, 28.8% had a female householder with no spouse or partner present and 14.1% had a male householder with no spouse or partner present. 38.2% of all households were non-families. 31.9% of all households were made up of individuals, 16.8% had someone living alone who was 65 years old or older.

The median age in the city was 34.4 years. 29.4% of the residents were under the age of 20. 4.6% were between the ages of 20 and 24; 30.2% were from 25 and 44; 17.2% were from 45 and 64; and 18.7% were 65 years of age or older. The gender makeup of the city was 47.2% male and 52.8% female.

=== 2010 census ===
As of the census of 2010, there were 507 people, 210 households, and 136 families living in the city. The population density was 211.3 inhabitants per square mile (81.6/km^{2}). There were 230 housing units at an average density of 95.8 per square mile (37.0/km^{2}). The racial makeup of the city was 91.5% White, 0.2% African American, 0.4% Native American, 0.2% Asian, 7.3% from other races, and 0.4% from two or more races. Hispanic or Latino of any race were 20.1% of the population.

There were 210 households, of which 31.0% had children under the age of 18 living with them, 52.4% were married couples living together, 7.6% had a female householder with no husband present, 4.8% had a male householder with no wife present, and 35.2% were non-families. 32.9% of all households were made up of individuals, and 21% had someone living alone who was 65 years of age or older. The average household size was 2.41 and the average family size was 3.07.

The median age in the city was 38.8 years. 24.3% of residents were under the age of 18; 10.2% were between the ages of 18 and 24; 22.6% were from 25 to 44; 22.2% were from 45 to 64; and 20.5% were 65 years of age or older. The gender makeup of the city was 46.0% male and 54.0% female.

=== 2000 census ===
As of the census of 2000, there were 535 people, 210 households, and 144 families living in the city. The population density was 228.9 inhabitants per square mile (88.4/km^{2}). There were 225 housing units at an average density of 96.3 per square mile (37.2/km^{2}). The racial makeup of the city was 87.29% White, 2.06% Native American, 9.35% from other races, and 1.31% from two or more races. Hispanic or Latino of any race were 17.57% of the population.

There were 210 households, out of which 29.0% had children under the age of 18 living with them, 61.0% were married couples living together, 5.2% had a female householder with no husband present, and 31.4% were non-families. 31.0% of all households were made up of individuals, and 22.4% had someone living alone who was 65 years of age or older. The average household size was 2.55 and the average family size was 3.15.

In the city, the population was spread out, with 26.4% under the age of 18, 6.5% from 18 to 24, 21.5% from 25 to 44, 17.0% from 45 to 64, and 28.6% who were 65 years of age or older. The median age was 42 years. For every 100 females, there were 88.4 males. For every 100 females age 18 and over, there were 87.6 males.

The median income for a household in the city was $29,028, and the median income for a family was $35,833. Males had a median income of $30,313 versus $21,042 for females. The per capita income for the city was $14,332. About 2.9% of families and 6.6% of the population were below the poverty line, including none of those under age 18 and 8.7% of those age 65 or over.

== Education ==
The CAL Community School District operates public schools.

St. Paul's Lutheran School operates an accredited private school for age ranges of K-12. The school has been in operation since 1925. The school received its accreditation by the National Lutheran School Association.
