= Iowa Falls Community School District =

Public school district in Iowa Falls, Iowa, united States

Location
- Iowa Falls, Iowa Hardin and Franklin counties United States
- Coordinates: 42.5292°N 93.26597°W

District information
- Type: Local school district
- Grades: K–12
- Superintendent: Tony Neumann
- Schools: 4
- Budget: $16,496,000 (2020-21)
- NCES District ID: 1914730

Students and staff
- Students: 1278 (2022-23)
- Teachers: 96.55 FTE
- Staff: 87.78 FTE
- Student–teacher ratio: 13.24
- Athletic conference: North Central
- District mascot: Cadets
- Colors: Black, Gold, and Red

Other information
- Website: www.ifacadets.net

Iowa Falls Community School District is a rural public school district headquartered in Iowa Falls, Iowa. The district occupies sections of Hardin and Franklin counties.

In 2006, parents in the northern portion of the Hubbard–Radcliffe Community School District preferred the idea of that district grade-sharing with Iowa Falls instead of the Eldora–New Providence Community School District.

From the 2014–15 school year until the 2017–18 school year, the district had entered into a grade-sharing agreement with the Alden Community School District in which students of particular grade levels attend schools in another districts' schools. Initially it was a two-way sharing agreement, or one in that both districts sent students to each other's schools. Alden hosted the 6th grade for both districts. By 2017 there was a proposal to modify it so only Alden sends students to Iowa Falls, and not the other way around, for a period until the 2027–28 school year. That way 6th-graders at Iowa Falls and Alden would go to their respective schools. All five members of the Iowa Falls CSD board approved this on May 9, 2016. The Iowa Falls CSD board, in 2016, had asked Alden to merge.

The school mascot is the Cadets. Their colors are black, gold, and red.

== Schools ==
The district operates:

- Iowa Falls-Alden High School
- Riverbend Middle School
- Rock Run Elementary School - grades 2–5
- Pineview Elementary School - grades PK–1

== Iowa Falls-Alden High School ==
=== Athletics ===
The Cadets compete in the North Central Conference in the following sports:

- Cross country
- Volleyball
  - 1999 Class 2A state champions
- Football
  - 1996 Class 2A state champions
- Basketball
  - Boys' 2-time Class 2A state champions (1998, 1999)
- Wrestling
- Track and field
  - Boys' 4-time state champions (1974, 1978, 1979, 1995)
- Golf
  - Boys' 1963 Class B state champions
- Tennis
- Soccer
- Baseball
  - 1998 Class 2A state champions
- Softball

== See also ==
- List of school districts in Iowa
- List of high schools in Iowa
