= Alden Community School District =

American public school district in Iowa

Location
- Alden, Iowa Hardin and Franklin counties United States
- Coordinates: 42.517654°N 93.372634°W

District information
- Type: Local school district
- Grades: K-6
- Schools: Alden Elementary School
- Budget: $3,975,000 (2020-21)
- NCES District ID: 1900032

Students and staff
- Students: 159 (2022-23)
- Teachers: 17.04 FTE
- Staff: 18.63 FTE
- Student–teacher ratio: 9.33

Other information
- Website: www.ifacadets.net

Alden Community School District is a rural public school district headquartered in Alden, Iowa. The district occupies sections of Hardin and Franklin counties. In addition to Alden, it serves Buckeye and Popejoy.

From the 2014–2015 school year until the 2017–2018 school year, the district had entered into a grade-sharing agreement with the Iowa Falls Community School District in which students of particular grade levels attend schools in another districts' schools. Initially it was a two-way sharing agreement, or one in that both districts sent students to each other's schools. Alden hosted the 6th grade for both districts. By 2017 there was a proposal to modify it so only Alden sends students to Iowa Falls, and not the other way around, for a period until the 2027–2028 school year. That way 6th graders at Iowa Falls and Alden would go to their respective schools. All five members of the Iowa Falls CSD board approved this on May 9, 2016. The Iowa Falls CSD board, in 2016, had asked Alden to merge.

== Schools ==
The district operates Alden Elementary School.

It grade-shares for Iowa Falls-Alden High School and Riverbend Middle School, both in Iowa Falls.

Previously the district operated Alden Junior High School and Alden High School.
