= Popejoy, Iowa =

- City
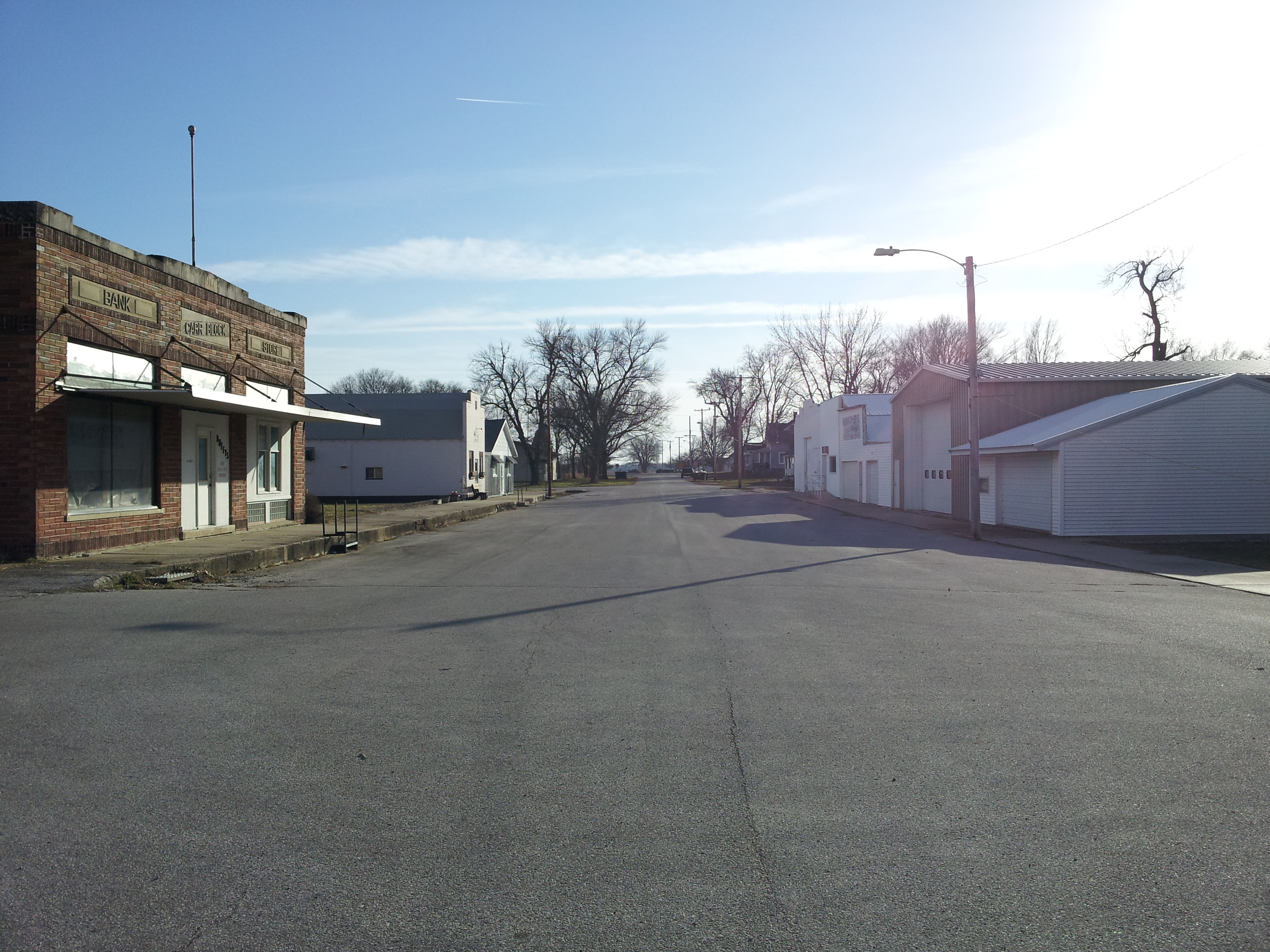
- Looking north down Main Street

- Location of Popejoy, Iowa
- Coordinates: 42°35′38″N 93°25′40″W
- Country: USA
- State: Iowa
- County: Franklin

Government
  - Mayor: Dale Maas

Area
  - Total: 0.75 sq mi (1.95 km^{2})
  - Land: 0.75 sq mi (1.95 km^{2})
  - Water: 0 sq mi (0.00 km^{2})
- Elevation: 1,158 ft (353 m)

Population (2020)
  - Total: 77
  - Density: 102.4/sq mi (39.52/km^{2})
- Time zone: UTC-6 (Central (CST))
  - Summer (DST): UTC-5 (CDT)
- ZIP code: 50227
- Area code: 515
- FIPS code: 19-64110
- GNIS feature ID: 2396251

Popejoy is a city in Franklin County, Iowa, United States. The population was 77 at the time of the 2020 census.

== History ==
Popejoy was platted in 1880; it was originally called Carleton. Popejoy was incorporated in 1908.

== Geography ==
According to the United States Census Bureau, the city has a total area of 0.74 square miles (1.92 km^{2}), all land.

== Demographics ==
Historical populations
Year	Pop.	±%
1910	200	—
1920	204	+2.0%
1930	207	+1.5%
1940	199	−3.9%
1950	201	+1.0%
1960	190	−5.5%
1970	147	−22.6%
1980	112	−23.8%
1990	92	−17.9%
2000	78	−15.2%
2010	79	+1.3%
2020	77	−2.5%
Source:"U.S. Census website". United States Census Bureau. and Iowa Data Center; Source: U.S. Decennial Census

=== 2020 census ===
As of the census of 2020, there were 77 people, 30 households, and 20 families residing in the city. The population density was 102.3 inhabitants per square mile (39.5/km^{2}). There were 42 housing units at an average density of 55.8 per square mile (21.6/km^{2}). The racial makeup of the city was 93.5% White, 0.0% Black or African American, 1.3% Native American, 0.0% Asian, 0.0% Pacific Islander, 0.0% from other races and 5.2% from two or more races. Hispanic or Latino persons of any race comprised 5.2% of the population.

Of the 30 households, 36.7% of which had children under the age of 18 living with them, 50.0% were married couples living together, 10.0% were cohabitating couples, 26.7% had a female householder with no spouse or partner present and 13.3% had a male householder with no spouse or partner present. 33.3% of all households were non-families. 23.3% of all households were made up of individuals, 10.0% had someone living alone who was 65 years old or older.

The median age in the city was 31.8 years. 36.4% of the residents were under the age of 20; 3.9% were between the ages of 20 and 24; 19.5% were from 25 and 44; 29.9% were from 45 and 64; and 10.4% were 65 years of age or older. The gender makeup of the city was 51.9% male and 48.1% female.

=== 2010 census ===
As of the census of 2010, there were 79 people, 33 households, and 21 families living in the city. The population density was 106.8 inhabitants per square mile (41.2/km^{2}). There were 42 housing units at an average density of 56.8 per square mile (21.9/km^{2}). The racial makeup of the city was 98.7% White and 1.3% from two or more races.

There were 33 households, of which 27.3% had children under the age of 18 living with them, 57.6% were married couples living together, 3.0% had a female householder with no husband present, 3.0% had a male householder with no wife present, and 36.4% were non-families. 27.3% of all households were made up of individuals, and 9.1% had someone living alone who was 65 years of age or older. The average household size was 2.39 and the average family size was 3.00.

The median age in the city was 35.5 years. 25.3% of residents were under the age of 18; 3.8% were between the ages of 18 and 24; 31.6% were from 25 to 44; 22.8% were from 45 to 64; and 16.5% were 65 years of age or older. The gender makeup of the city was 50.6% male and 49.4% female.

=== 2000 census ===
As of the census of 2000, there were 78 people, 33 households, and 22 families living in the city. The population density was 106.7 inhabitants per square mile (41.2/km^{2}). There were 37 housing units at an average density of 50.6 per square mile (19.5/km^{2}). The racial makeup of the city was 96.15% White, and 3.85% from two or more races.

There were 33 households, out of which 24.2% had children under the age of 18 living with them, 57.6% were married couples living together, 3.0% had a female householder with no husband present, and 33.3% were non-families. 21.2% of all households were made up of individuals, and 15.2% had someone living alone who was 65 years of age or older. The average household size was 2.36 and the average family size was 2.86.

In the city, the population was spread out, with 20.5% under the age of 18, 12.8% from 18 to 24, 25.6% from 25 to 44, 17.9% from 45 to 64, and 23.1% who were 65 years of age or older. The median age was 40 years. For every 100 females, there were 110.8 males. For every 100 females age 18 and over, there were 100.0 males.

The median income for a household in the city was $29,464, and the median income for a family was $35,625. Males had a median income of $28,333 versus $14,375 for females. The per capita income for the city was $13,666. There were no families and 6.3% of the population living below the poverty line, including no under eighteens and 10.0% of those over 64.

== Education ==
Alden Community School District operates public schools serving the community.
