= Coulter, Iowa =

- City
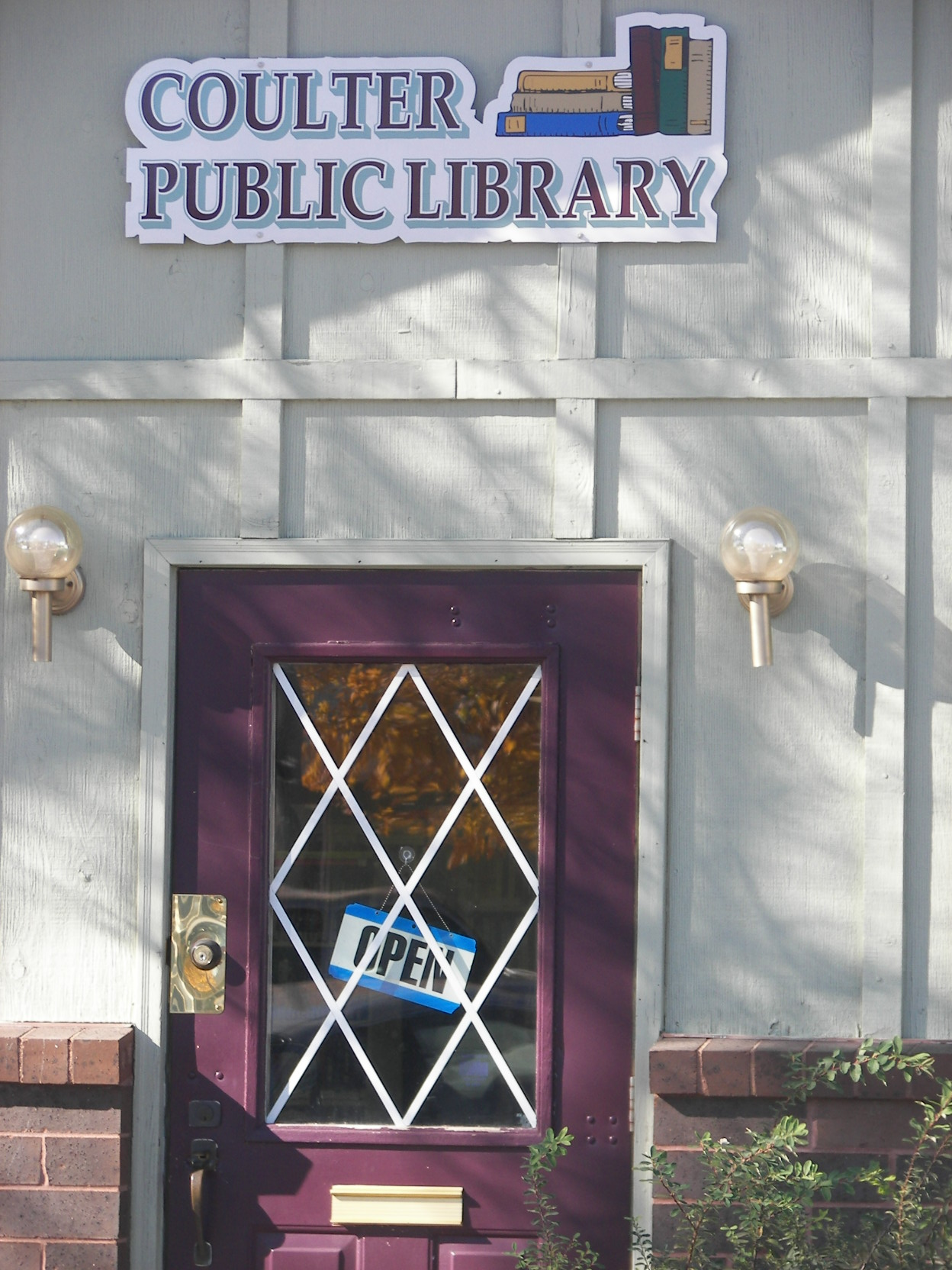
- Coulter Public Library in 2007

- Location of Coulter, Iowa
- Coordinates: 42°43′59″N 93°22′34″W
- Country: USA
- State: Iowa
- County: Franklin

Area
  - Total: 2.47 sq mi (6.40 km^{2})
  - Land: 2.47 sq mi (6.40 km^{2})
  - Water: 0 sq mi (0.00 km^{2})
- Elevation: 1,237 ft (377 m)

Population (2020)
  - Total: 219
  - Density: 88.7/sq mi (34.24/km^{2})
- Time zone: UTC-6 (Central (CST))
  - Summer (DST): UTC-5 (CDT)
- ZIP code: 50431
- Area code: 641
- FIPS code: 19-16815
- GNIS feature ID: 2393649

Coulter is a city in Franklin County, Iowa, United States. The population was 219 at the 2020 census.

== History ==
Coulter got its start in the 1880s, following construction of the Chicago & Great Western Railway through that territory.

== Geography ==
According to the United States Census Bureau, the city has a total area of 2.45 square miles (6.35 km^{2}), all land.

== Demographics ==
Historical populations
Year	Pop.	±%
1910	198	—
1920	277	+39.9%
1930	266	−4.0%
1940	236	−11.3%
1950	271	+14.8%
1960	315	+16.2%
1970	262	−16.8%
1980	264	+0.8%
1990	252	−4.5%
2000	262	+4.0%
2010	281	+7.3%
2020	219	−22.1%
Source:"U.S. Census website". United States Census Bureau. and Iowa Data Center; Source: U.S. Decennial Census

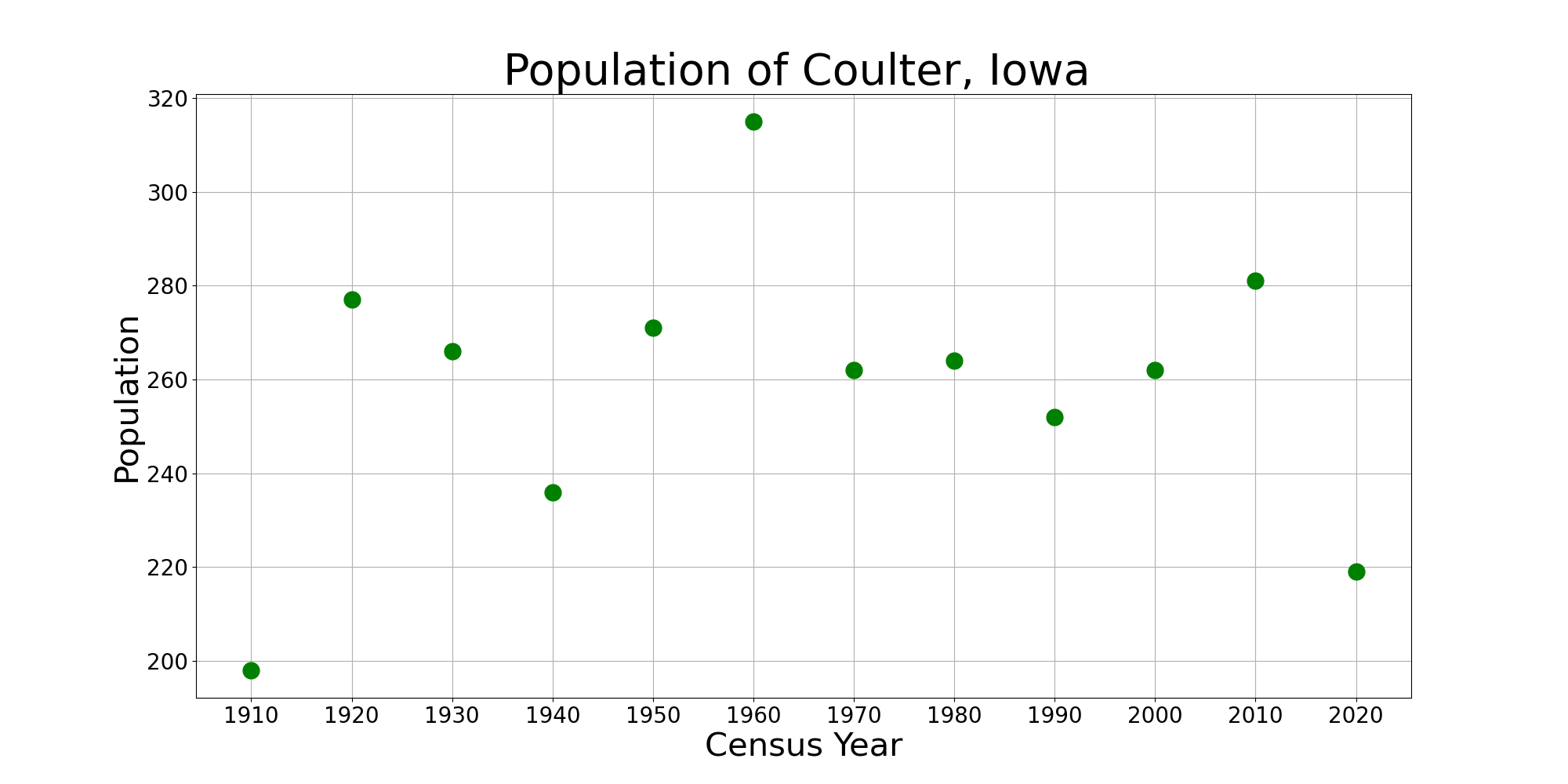
The population of Coulter, Iowa from US census data

=== 2020 census ===
As of the census of 2020, there were 219 people, 102 households, and 56 families residing in the city. The population density was 88.7 inhabitants per square mile (34.3/km^{2}). There were 113 housing units at an average density of 45.8 per square mile (17.7/km^{2}). The racial makeup of the city was 83.1% White, 0.0% Black or African American, 0.0% Native American, 0.0% Asian, 0.0% Pacific Islander, 9.6% from other races and 7.3% from two or more races. Hispanic or Latino persons of any race comprised 24.2% of the population.

Of the 102 households, 24.5% of which had children under the age of 18 living with them, 36.3% were married couples living together, 8.8% were cohabitating couples, 27.5% had a female householder with no spouse or partner present and 27.5% had a male householder with no spouse or partner present. 45.1% of all households were non-families. 36.3% of all households were made up of individuals, 8.8% had someone living alone who was 65 years old or older.

The median age in the city was 40.5 years. 26.9% of the residents were under the age of 20; 4.6% were between the ages of 20 and 24; 23.7% were from 25 and 44; 28.3% were from 45 and 64; and 16.4% were 65 years of age or older. The gender makeup of the city was 56.6% male and 43.4% female.

=== 2010 census ===
At the 2010 census there were 281 people, 107 households, and 76 families living in the city. The population density was 114.7 inhabitants per square mile (44.3/km^{2}). There were 117 housing units at an average density of 47.8 per square mile (18.5/km^{2}). The racial makeup of the city was 87.2% White, 0.4% African American, 12.1% from other races, and 0.4% from two or more races. Hispanic or Latino people of any race were 14.9%.

Of the 107 households 37.4% had children under the age of 18 living with them, 55.1% were married couples living together, 6.5% had a female householder with no husband present, 9.3% had a male householder with no wife present, and 29.0% were non-families. 26.2% of households were one person and 11.2% were one person aged 65 or older. The average household size was 2.63 and the average family size was 3.12.

The median age was 34.5 years. 29.5% of residents were under the age of 18; 8% were between the ages of 18 and 24; 24.6% were from 25 to 44; 27.3% were from 45 to 64; and 10.7% were 65 or older. The gender makeup of the city was 55.2% male and 44.8% female.

=== 2000 census ===
At the 2000 census there were 262 people, 105 households, and 66 families living in the city. The population density was 106.8 inhabitants per square mile (41.2/km^{2}). There were 118 housing units at an average density of 48.1 per square mile (18.6/km^{2}). The racial makeup of the city was 96.18% White, 3.82% from other races. Hispanic or Latino people of any race were 4.20%.

Of the 105 households 29.5% had children under the age of 18 living with them, 51.4% were married couples living together, 8.6% had a female householder with no husband present, and 37.1% were non-families. 27.6% of households were one person and 9.5% were one person aged 65 or older. The average household size was 2.50 and the average family size was 3.14.

The age distribution was 27.9% under the age of 18, 7.6% from 18 to 24, 26.3% from 25 to 44, 20.6% from 45 to 64, and 17.6% 65 or older. The median age was 37 years. For every 100 females, there were 114.8 males. For every 100 females age 18 and over, there were 110.0 males.

The median household income was $35,208 and the median family income was $38,958. Males had a median income of $26,538 versus $20,625 for females. The per capita income for the city was $14,056. About 13.4% of families and 18.4% of the population were below the poverty line, including 36.3% of those under the age of eighteen and none of those sixty five or over.

== Education ==
The CAL Community School District operates public schools serving Coulter.
