= Franklin County, Iowa =

County in Iowa, United States

- County
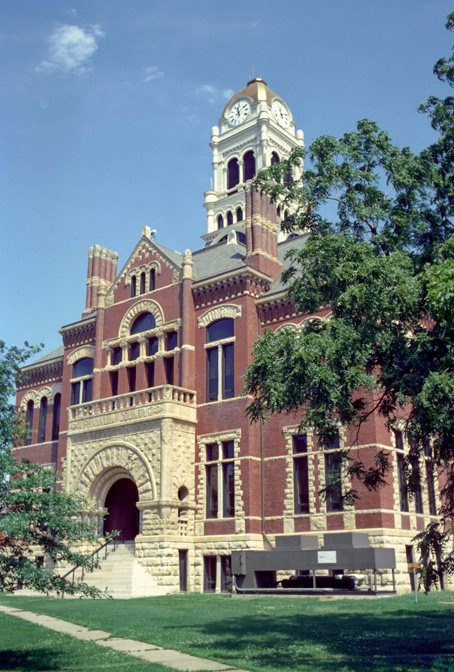
- The Franklin County Courthouse in Hampton

- Location within the U.S. state of Iowa
- Coordinates: 42°43′51″N 93°16′03″W
- Country: United States
- State: Iowa
- Founded: January 15, 1851 (created); March 3, 1856(organized)
- Named for: Benjamin Franklin
- Seat: Hampton
- Largest city: Hampton

Area
  - Total: 583 sq mi (1,510 km^{2})
  - Land: 582 sq mi (1,510 km^{2})
  - Water: 0.6 sq mi (1.6 km^{2}) 0.09%

Population (2020)
  - Total: 10,019
  - Estimate (2025): 9,868 ▼
  - Density: 17.2/sq mi (6.65/km^{2})
- Time zone: UTC−6 (Central)
  - Summer (DST): UTC−5 (CDT)
- Congressional district: 4th
- Website: www.franklincountyia.gov
- Iowa county number 35

Franklin County is a county located in the U.S. state of Iowa. As of the 2020 census, the population was 10,019. The county seat is Hampton. The county was formed on January 15, 1851 and named after Benjamin Franklin.

== Geography ==
According to the United States Census Bureau, the county has a total area of 583 square miles (1,510 km^{2}), of which 582 square miles (1,510 km^{2}) is land and 0.6 square miles (1.6 km^{2}) (0.09%) is water.

=== Major highways ===
- Interstate 35
- U.S. Highway 65
- Iowa Highway 3
- Iowa Highway 57

=== Adjacent counties ===
- Cerro Gordo County (north)
- Butler County (east)
- Hardin County (south)
- Wright County (west)
- Grundy County (southeast)

== Demographics ==
Historical population
Census	Pop.	Note	%±
1860	1,309		—
1870	4,738		262.0%
1880	10,249		116.3%
1890	12,871		25.6%
1900	14,996		16.5%
1910	14,780		−1.4%
1920	15,807		6.9%
1930	16,382		3.6%
1940	16,379		0.0%
1950	16,268		−0.7%
1960	15,472		−4.9%
1970	13,255		−14.3%
1980	13,036		−1.7%
1990	11,364		−12.8%
2000	10,704		−5.8%
2010	10,680		−0.2%
2020	10,019		−6.2%
2025 (est.)	9,868	▼	−1.5%
U.S. Decennial Census; 1790–1960 1900–1990; 1990–2000 2010–2020

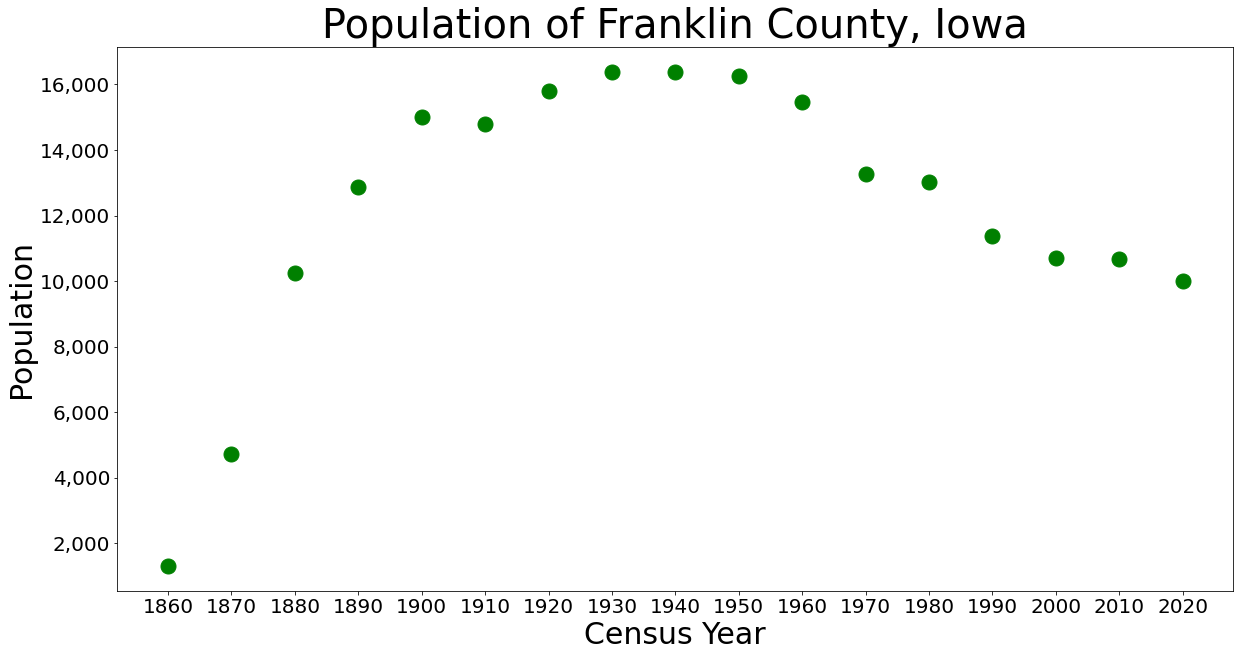
Population of Franklin County from US census data

=== 2020 census ===
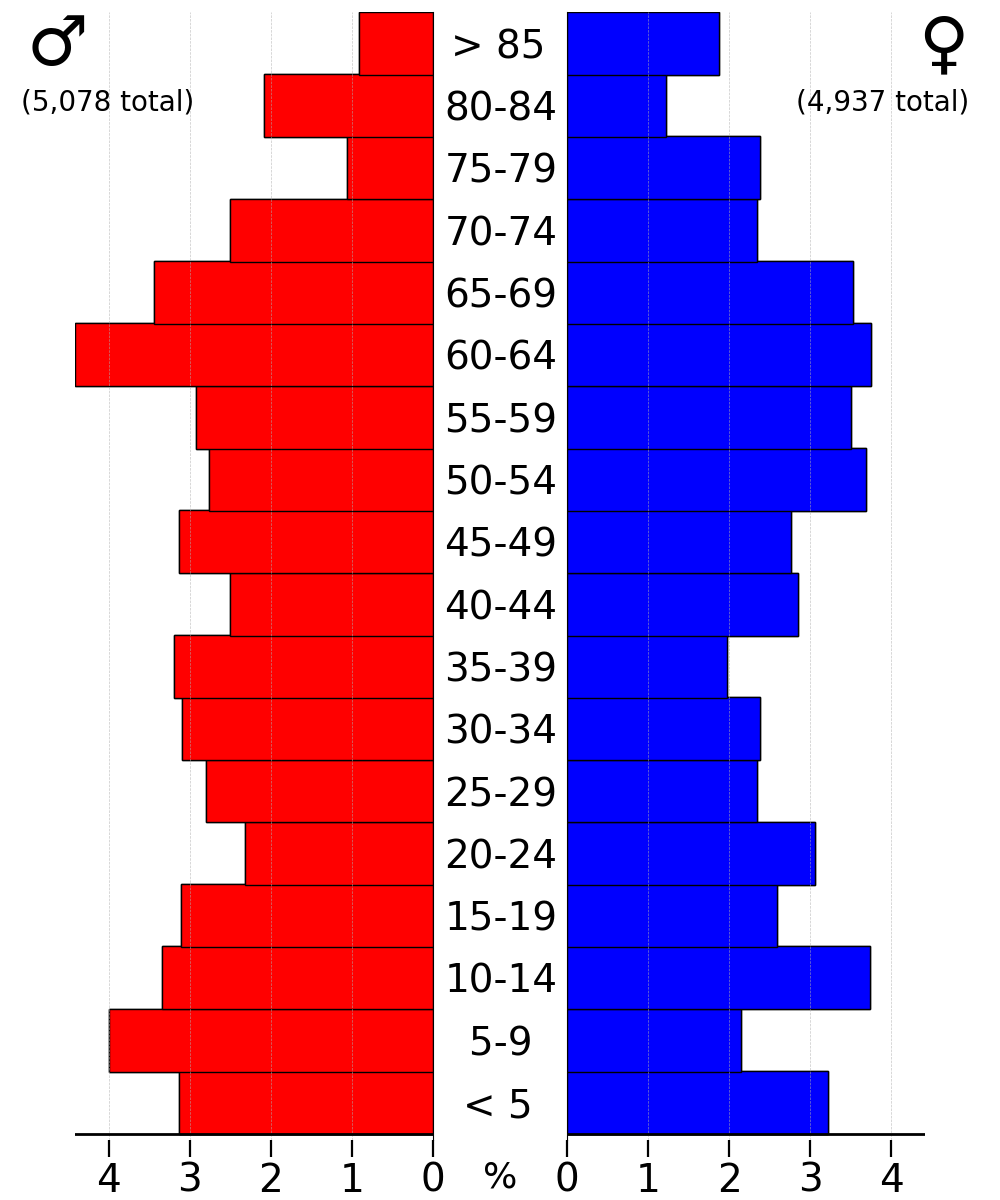
2022 US Census population pyramid for Franklin County from ACS 5-year estimates

As of the 2020 census, the county had a population of 10,019, a population density of 17.2/sq mi (6.6/km^{2}), and 92.62% of the population reported being of one race.

The median age was 42.5 years, 23.5% of residents were under the age of 18, and 22.1% were 65 years of age or older. For every 100 females there were 102.3 males, and for every 100 females age 18 and over there were 98.1 males.

The racial makeup of the county was 83.5% White, 0.3% Black or African American, 0.7% American Indian and Alaska Native, 0.5% Asian, <0.1% Native Hawaiian and Pacific Islander, 7.6% from some other race, and 7.4% from two or more races. Hispanic or Latino residents of any race comprised 16.3% of the population.

<0.1% of residents lived in urban areas, while 100.0% lived in rural areas.

There were 4,141 households in the county, of which 27.8% had children under the age of 18 living in them. Of all households, 52.4% were married-couple households, 18.9% were households with a male householder and no spouse or partner present, and 21.8% were households with a female householder and no spouse or partner present. About 28.8% of all households were made up of individuals and 14.2% had someone living alone who was 65 years of age or older.

There were 4,656 housing units, of which 11.1% were vacant. Among occupied housing units, 74.6% were owner-occupied and 25.4% were renter-occupied. The homeowner vacancy rate was 2.2% and the rental vacancy rate was 8.4%.

Franklin County Racial Composition
Race	Number	Percent
White (NH)	8,034	80.2%
Black or African American (NH)	32	0.32%
Native American (NH)	18	0.2%
Asian (NH)	49	0.5%
Pacific Islander (NH)	0	0%
Other/Mixed (NH)	252	2.5%
Hispanic or Latino	1,634	16.31%

=== 2010 census ===
The 2010 census recorded a population of 10,680 in the county, with a population density of 18.3/sq mi (7.1/km^{2}). There were 4,894 housing units, of which 4,332 were occupied.

=== 2000 census ===
As of the census of 2000, there were 10,704 people, 4,356 households, and 2,983 families residing in the county. The population density was 18 people per square mile (6.9 people/km^{2}). There were 4,763 housing units at an average density of 8 units per square mile (3.1 units/km^{2}). The racial makeup of the county was 94.92% White, 0.08% Black or African American, 0.23% Native American, 0.16% Asian, 0.02% Pacific Islander, 4.05% from other races, and 0.53% from two or more races. 6.00% of the population were Hispanic or Latino of any race.

There were 4,356 households, out of which 29.30% had children under the age of 18 living with them, 58.90% were married couples living together, 6.40% had a female householder with no husband present, and 31.50% were non-families. 27.60% of all households were made up of individuals, and 15.40% had someone living alone who was 65 years of age or older. The average household size was 2.41 and the average family size was 2.93.

In the county, the population was spread out, with 24.20% under the age of 18, 7.30% from 18 to 24, 24.00% from 25 to 44, 23.90% from 45 to 64, and 20.50% who were 65 years of age or older. The median age was 41 years. For every 100 females there were 96.40 males. For every 100 females age 18 and over, there were 93.90 males.

The median income for a household in the county was $36,042, and the median income for a family was $45,184. Males had a median income of $29,694 versus $21,115 for females. The per capita income for the county was $18,767. About 5.70% of families and 8.00% of the population were below the poverty line, including 9.70% of those under age 18 and 7.10% of those age 65 or over.

== Franklin County Fair ==
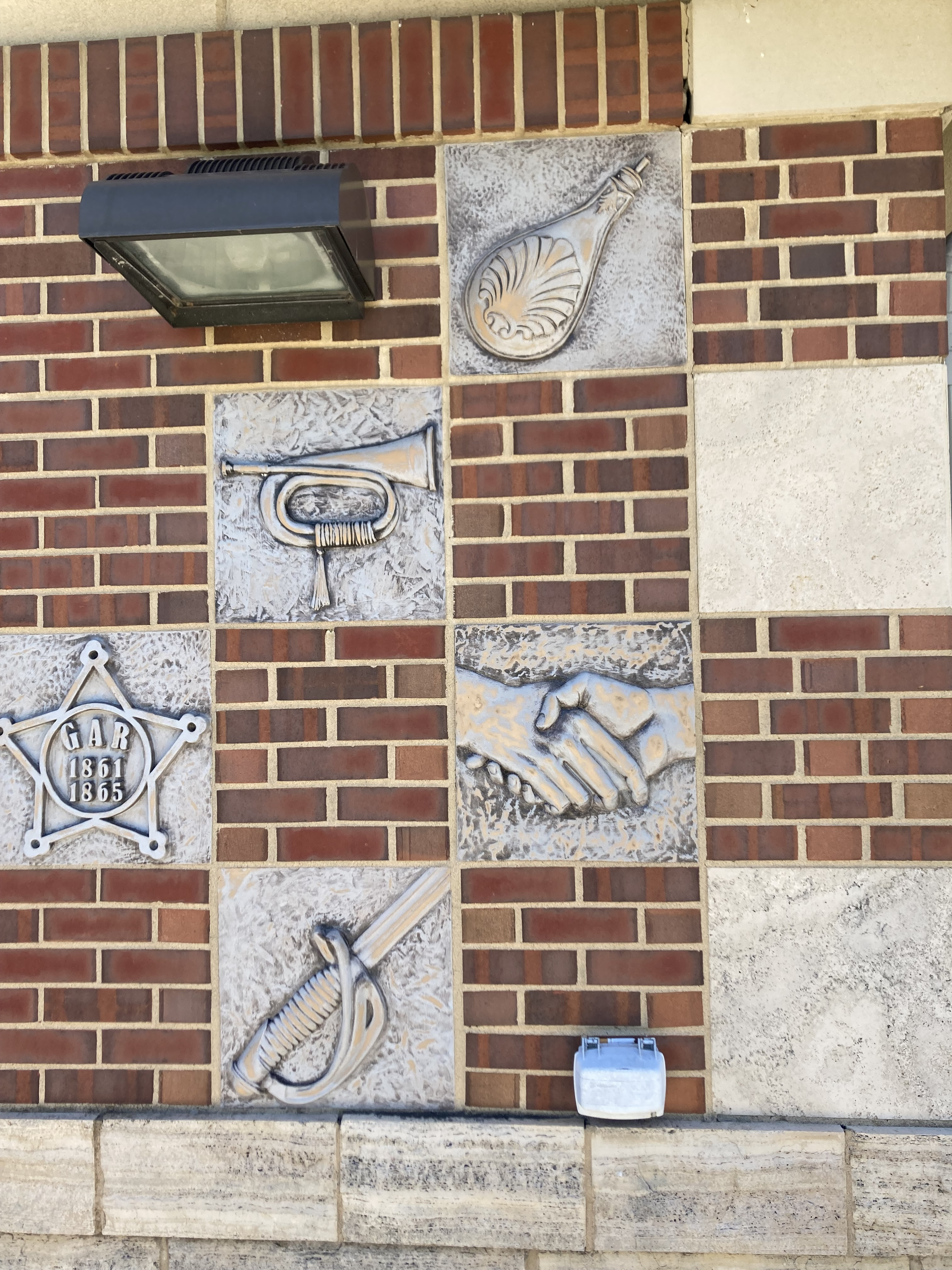
Outside wall display honoring Civil War veterans on I-35 rest stop in the county

Franklin County is home to the Franklin County Fair. Held annually for five days in mid-July, the Franklin County Fair is held on the fairgrounds located on the west side of Hampton. Traditionally, grandstand entertainment begins on Wednesday with the Barnes PRCA Rodeo. Thursday, Friday, and Saturday are usually concerts featuring nationally known entertainment. In 2007 such names as Terri Clark, Marshall Tucker Band, and Trent Tomlinson & Danielle Peck brought fans to the grandstand. On Sunday the Figure 8 Races generally fill the grandstand. The fair also includes free entertainment and a carnival midway. The fairgrounds features the Franklin County Historical Museum, Pleasant Hill (turn of the century village with stores, crafters, old west shows, music and entertainment), and Grandpa's Farm (all phases of farming demonstrated with vintage implements powered by draft horses, steam engines and antique tractors).

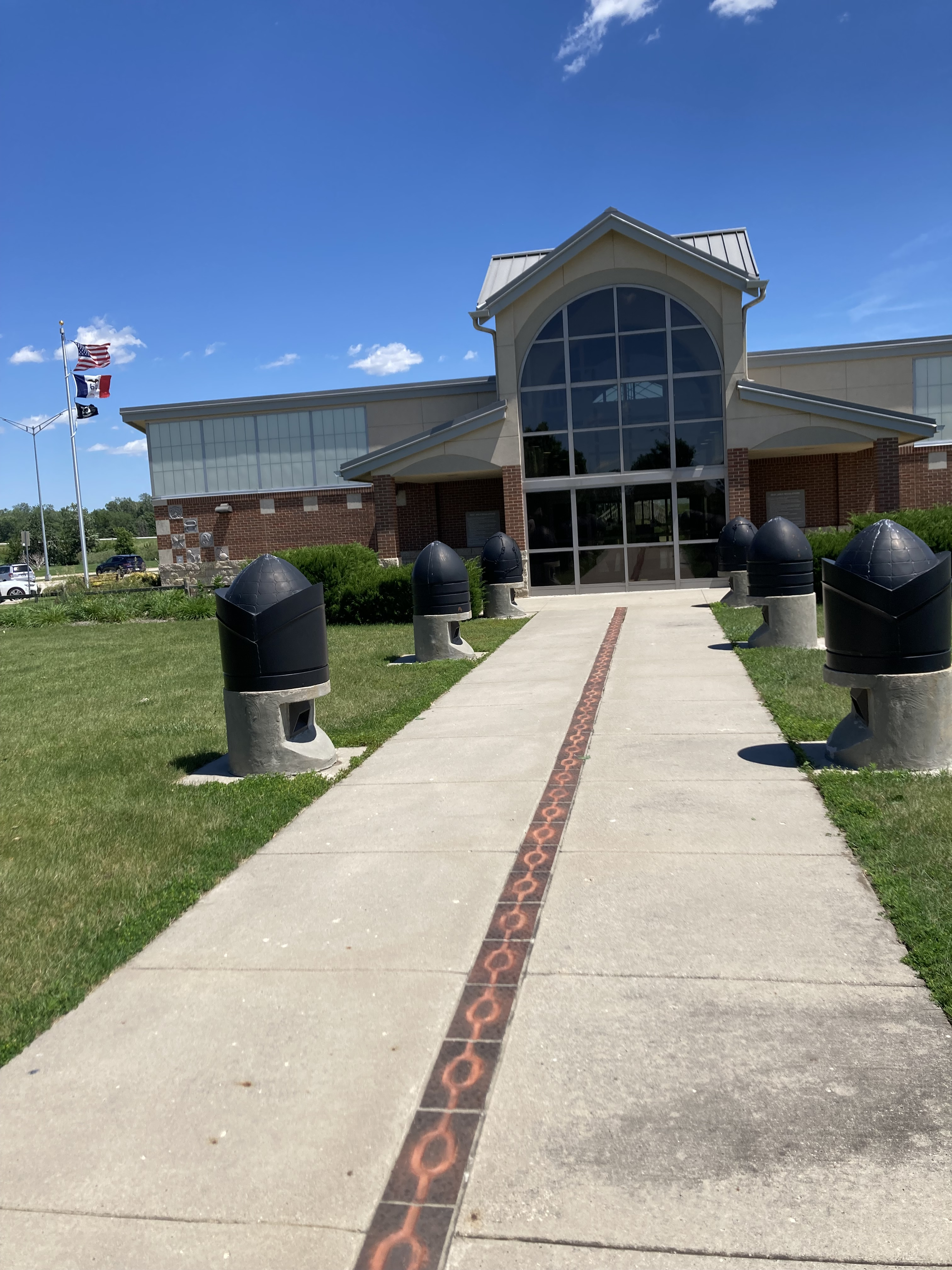
Outside landscape display honoring Civil War veterans on I-35 rest stop in the county

== Education ==
There are four high schools in Franklin County. The Hampton–Dumont Community School District is a P/K-12 school system located in Hampton and serving the communities of Hampton, Dumont, Aredale, and Hansell. Hampton-Dumont has a K-12 enrollment of 1,194. The West Fork Community School District is made up of a whole grade sharing agreement between SCMT and Rockwell-Swaledale. West Fork serves the communities of Sheffield, Chapin, Meservey, Thornton, Rockwell, and Swaledale and has a combined enrollment of 764 between the two districts. The AGWSR Community School District serves the communities of Ackley, Geneva, Wellsburg, and Steamboat Rock and has a K-12 enrollment of 654 students. The CAL Community School District, located just south of Latimer, serves the communities of Coulter, Alexander, and Latimer and has a K-12 enrollment of 274 students.

== Communities ==
=== Cities ===
- Ackley
- Alexander
- Coulter
- Dows
- Geneva
- Hampton
- Hansell
- Latimer
- Popejoy
- Sheffield

=== Census-designated places ===
- Bradford
- Chapin

Unincorporated communities

- Burdette
- Faulkner
- Oakland

=== Townships ===
Franklin County is divided into sixteen townships:

- Geneva
- Grant
- Hamilton
- Ingham
- Lee
- Marion
- Morgan
- Mott
- Oakland
- Osceola
- Reeve
- Richland
- Ross
- Scott
- West Fork
- Wisner

=== Population ranking ===
The population ranking of the following table is based on the 2020 census of Franklin County.

† county seat

Rank	City/Town/etc.	Municipal type	Population (2020 Census)
1	† Hampton	City	4,337
2	Ackley (partially in Hardin County)	City	1,599
3	Sheffield	City	1,130
4	Dows (partially in Wright County)	City	521
5	Latimer	City	477
6	Coulter	City	219
7	Alexander	City	163
8	Geneva	City	136
9	Bradford	CDP	84
10	Hansell	City	82
11	Popejoy	City	77
12	Chapin	CDP	71

== Politics ==
United States presidential election results for Franklin County, Iowa
Year	Republican		Democratic		Third party(ies)	
Year	No.	%	No.	%	No.	%
1896	2,439	72.57%	894	26.60%	28	0.83%
1900	2,537	76.37%	748	22.52%	37	1.11%
1904	2,346	79.63%	531	18.02%	69	2.34%
1908	2,154	73.02%	737	24.98%	59	2.00%
1912	773	25.21%	694	22.64%	1,599	52.15%
1916	2,464	77.24%	691	21.66%	35	1.10%
1920	4,397	86.06%	601	11.76%	111	2.17%
1924	3,064	58.74%	360	6.90%	1,792	34.36%
1928	3,424	65.54%	1,688	32.31%	112	2.14%
1932	2,013	32.95%	3,782	61.90%	315	5.16%
1936	2,530	37.73%	3,993	59.55%	182	2.71%
1940	3,623	49.56%	3,540	48.43%	147	2.01%
1944	3,150	51.96%	2,851	47.03%	61	1.01%
1948	2,716	45.11%	2,871	47.68%	434	7.21%
1952	5,432	72.72%	1,941	25.98%	97	1.30%
1956	4,563	64.41%	2,513	35.47%	8	0.11%
1960	4,514	64.52%	2,476	35.39%	6	0.09%
1964	2,452	40.46%	3,582	59.10%	27	0.45%
1968	3,604	63.48%	1,777	31.30%	296	5.21%
1972	3,643	62.96%	1,986	34.32%	157	2.71%
1976	3,056	52.30%	2,682	45.90%	105	1.80%
1980	3,290	57.90%	1,920	33.79%	472	8.31%
1984	3,129	56.43%	2,349	42.36%	67	1.21%
1988	2,320	46.86%	2,594	52.39%	37	0.75%
1992	2,137	40.58%	2,049	38.91%	1,080	20.51%
1996	2,054	43.40%	2,232	47.16%	447	9.44%
2000	2,657	53.81%	2,122	42.97%	159	3.22%
2004	3,128	56.66%	2,340	42.38%	53	0.96%
2008	2,501	48.57%	2,575	50.01%	73	1.42%
2012	2,823	54.44%	2,266	43.69%	97	1.87%
2016	3,163	63.67%	1,493	30.05%	312	6.28%
2020	3,422	66.71%	1,626	31.70%	82	1.60%
2024	3,431	70.02%	1,393	28.43%	76	1.55%

== See also ==
- National Register of Historic Places listings in Franklin County, Iowa
- The Franklin County Courthouse in Hampton was built in 1891 and was listed on the National Register of Historic Places in 1976.
