= Dows Community School District =

Former school district in Iowa

Dows Community School District was a school district headquartered in Dows, Iowa. It covered 101 square miles (260 km^{2}) of area.

== History ==
Previously it did a grade-sharing program with the CAL Community School District, with each district having its own elementary school, Dows operating the middle school, and CAL operating the high school. Circa 2004 the Dows district had 154 students.

In 2005 it began sharing programs and employees with the Clarion–Goldfield Community School District. The two school districts sought a merger because of declining enrollments and because a State of Iowa funding program for small schools was to be terminated in 2013.

The election for whether the districts should be merged was scheduled for September 10, 2013; 98% of Clarion–Goldfield voters and 85% of the Dows voters approved of the merger. On July 1, 2014, they merged into the Clarion–Goldfield–Dows Community School District.

Dows Community School District was established in 1880. The old high school was located in what is today city park. In 1914 a brick school building was built in the northwest side of town, where it stands today. In 1935, a two-story addition was built to the west that includes the gymnasium, office space, home economics room, and the upper level includes the library media center with two computer labs. In 1954 a one-story addition was built to the west that includes six elementary classrooms, band room, art room, ICN room, and Ag/Shop area. In 1961 an addition was built to the west of the elementary wing and includes four additional elementary classrooms. It was in the 1950s and 1960s that enrollment reached record levels of 532 students. In 1980 a multipurpose room was built to the north of the gym. In the 1980s and 1990s a bond issue was passed an extensive renovations were completed to all parts of the building.

Dows had many successes in sports over the years. The Dows Tigers won the state baseball championship in 1928. They also qualified for state in 1937. Dows had 2 individual girls state track championships. Dows/CAL qualified for the Class 1A State Football Playoffs in 1993. Dows had basketball players receive all-state basketball recognition in 1991, 1992, 1995, and 1996. Dows and CAL shared football, track, baseball, and softball in the last few years of the Dows High School. Dows and Northeast Hamilton also shared a girls basketball team for the 1997–98 season, which finished with a record of 19–4. The CAL/Dows High School began a wrestling program in 2002, with meets and practices being held at Dows. This lasted until the CAL/Dows partnership ended and included one year of a shared CAL/Dows/Northeast Hamilton wrestling program being held at Dows.

Dows was a founding member of the North Star Conference and continued membership into the 1950s and early 1960s. Teams in the early years of the North Star Conference included Boone Valley (Renwick), Corwith-Wesley, Dows, Fertile, Franklin Consolidated (now CAL of Latimer), Goldfield, Kanawha, Klemme, LuVerne, Rockwell, Sheffield, and Ventura. Dows was a member of the Iowa River Valley Conference in the 1960s and 1970s, which included Alden, Dows, Gilbert, Hubbard, NESCO, Northeast Hamilton, Radcliffe, and Union-Whitten. In the late 1970s, Dows rejoined the North Star Conference, which over the years included Alden, CAL of Latimer (later CAL/Dows), Corwith-Wesley/LuVerne, Dows, Meservey-Thornton, Northeast Hamilton of Blairsburg, Sheffield-Chapin (later SCMT, now West Fork), Southeast Webster-Grand, Twin River Valley of Bode, Ventura, and Woden-Crystal Lake/Titonka. CAL/Dows High School continued to be a member of the North Star Conference until it dissolved in 2004. At that time CAL/Dows joined the Iowa Star Conference. Dows began whole grade sharing with Clarion–Goldfield in 2005 and consolidated to become Clarion–Goldfield–Dows in 2014. Clarion–Goldfield–Dows is a member of the North Central Conference, which currently includes Algona, Clarion–Goldfield-Dows, Clear Lake, Hampton-Dumont, Humboldt, Iowa Falls-Alden, St. Edmond Catholic (Fort Dodge), and Webster City.

Starting in 1996 and 1997, discussions were held on the future of the school district due to declining enrollment, which resulted in less funding. Scenarios were considered by the school board, including a 2-way or 1-way whole grade sharing agreement with CAL (Latimer). Dows and CAL already shared several sports since 1987, many of which were hosted by Dows. A 1-way whole grade sharing agreement was also considered with Belmond-Klemme, Northeast Hamilton (Blairsburg), Clarion-Goldfield, and Alden. Under a 1-way whole grade sharing arrangement, Dows would have maintained a K-8 or K-6 building and send the upper grades to another partner district. Dows and Northeast Hamilton had a history of sharing programs, including Vocational Agriculture, Industrial Arts, Physics, Golf, and Girls Basketball. Ultimately, the decision was made to pursue a 2-way whole grade sharing partnership with CAL.

Dows maintained a K-12 elementary program, with a community funded preschool program, until 1998. The last class to graduate from Dows High School was in 1998. In the fall of that same year, the district began a whole grade sharing agreement with CAL Community School of Latimer, IA that would last for the next seven years. Under the agreement, both Dows and CAL maintained separate elementary schools (K-5), the shared Dows/CAL Middle School (6-8) was housed at Dows, and the shared CAL/Dows High School was at Latimer. The districts shared a superintendent and several staff members.

In 2003 and 2004, much discussion was held about the future of the districts. Possibilities were discussed including a 3-way whole grade sharing agreement between Hampton-Dumont, CAL, and Dows; continuing or expanding 2-way sharing between CAL and Dows; and Dows beginning a 1-way whole grade sharing agreement with either Clarion–Goldfield, Belmond-Klemme, or CAL. After much discussion it was ultimately it was decided that Clarion–Goldfield would provide the best educational opportunities and stability for the long-term future of Dows area students. When the partnership with CAL Community School ended, CAL re-established itself as an independent P/K-12 school district. Initially, quite a few of the high school students that were already attending CAL open enrolled to finish attending school at CAL. Over time, as those classes graduated a vast majority of the Dows students were attending school in Clarion.

In 2005 the district began a ten-year whole grade sharing agreement with Clarion–Goldfield School District. Dows maintains its own separate P/K-5 elementary school and students in grades 6–12 attended school in Clarion. The districts also shared a superintendent, principal, and several other staff members.

In 2006, the district began the Tiger Learning Center (TLC), an after school program. In 2008, Dows Elementary School became a multi-age school that combines classrooms kindergarten and first grade, second and third grades, and fourth and fifth grades. Dows Elementary offered small class sizes that provide individualized attention and an academic program that can compete with any in the state. In 2008–09, the Dows Elementary School reported some of the highest Iowa Tests of Basic Skills results of any school in the state. The Dows district received a grant for the preschool program to be funded by the state in 2009–10. In 2013–14, the sharing agreement was expanded to include grades 4–12. The Dows Elementary School educated students in Dows for preschool through third grade for that year.

On September 10, 2013, voters in both districts approved consolidation into one district. Beginning with the 2014–15 school year, the Dows and Clarion–Goldfield districts became the Clarion–Goldfield–Dows Community School District. The new district covers 363 square miles in include portions of Wright, Franklin, Hancock, and Humboldt Counties, and stretches approximately 50 miles from the northwest corner near Renwick to the southeast corner near Dows. During the final year as an independent school district, the certified enrollment at Dows increased from 124 to 139. With the consolidation, the Dows building was closed in its centennial year of operation. All students will be bussed to Clarion for all classes and activities. The district sold the school building and bus barn to a company wanting to use it to warehouse pioneer seed. Some people in the community were unhappy, stating that they feel that there was no public involvement or communication in that decision. The playground and football/track/baseball complex were being given to the City of Dows to be maintained. The new district has a K–12 enrollment of nearly 1,000 students in grades K–12.

Clarion–Goldfield–Dows, with a theme of "Preparing Students Today for Tomorrow", has a one-to-one laptop program for high school students and a one-to-one iPad program for middle school students. Since Dows began its partnership in 2005, Clarion–Goldfield–Dows has qualified for the Class 2A State Football Playoffs five times (2005, 2010, 2011, 2012, and 2014). Clarion–Goldfield–Dows won the State Wrestling Team Duals in 2014 and 2015. CGD has had two individual girls state track champions. CGD has had some very successful girls basketball and volleyball teams as well.

Dows Corn Days in 2014 was held as an all-school reunion. The school building was opened one last time for past alumni, students, teachers, staff, and community members to take one last look. The building was full of people reminiscing of years gone. The football field will be used to host a fireworks display at Dows Corn Days starting in 2015.
