= CAL Community School District =

School district in Iowa, US

Coordinates: 41.662855°N 92.018800°W

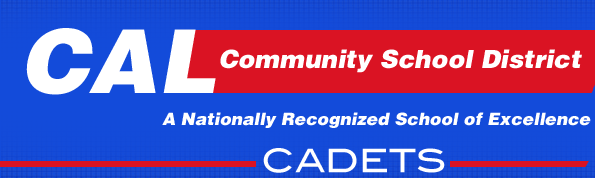

Location
- Latimer, Iowa Franklin County and Wright County United States
- Coordinates: 41.662855, -92.018800

District information
- Type: Local school district
- Grades: K–6
- Superintendent: Todd Lettow
- Budget: $4,517,000 (2020-21)
- NCES District ID: 1905970

Students and staff
- Students: 176 (2022-23)
- Teachers: 15.68 FTE
- Staff: 20.84 FTE
- Student–teacher ratio: 11.22
- District mascot: Cadets
- Colors: Blue and Red

Other information
- Website: www.cal.k12.ia.us

CAL Community School District is a public school district headquartered in Latimer, Iowa.

The district is mostly in Franklin County with a section in Wright County, and serves Latimer, Alexander, and Coulter.

== History ==
The first consolidation among the three towns that later made up CAL was in 1947, with the merger of the Coulter Consolidated School and the Latimer Consolidated School, to form the Franklin Consolidated School District. Shortly thereafter, land was acquired at a site approximately halfway between Latimer and Coulter, two miles to the south, and construction began on a new school, which opened in 1951. In 1962, Franklin Consolidated merged with the Alexander Consolidated School, and the district rebranded itself as CAL Community School. In 1998, after a long period of declining enrollment in both districts, CAL and the Dows Community School District began a grade-sharing program with each district having its own elementary school, Dows operating the middle school, and CAL operating the high school. Circa 2004, the CAL district had 241 students. In the 2016–17 school year the district had 261 students.

As a way to lower costs, the district was scheduled to begin sharing a superintendent with the Hampton–Dumont Community School District in 2016. The school board of Hampton–Dumont CSD approved the arrangement, effective July 1 that year. In 2018, the district entered into a whole grade-sharing agreement with Hampton–Dumont, sending its secondary students there. Shortly after the grade-sharing agreement was allowed to lapse in 2014, Dows opted to consolidate with the much larger Clarion-Goldfield Community School, which renamed itself Clarion-Goldfield-Dows Community School.

== Schools ==
- CAL Elementary School, Latimer

Secondary students attend Hampton–Dumont Community School District through a grade sharing agreement.

=== Athletics ===
Prior to the agreement, the CAL Cadets competed in the Iowa Star Conference.

- 1987 boys' class 1A track & field state champions
