= Hampton–Dumont Community School District =

Public school district in Hampton, Iowa, United States

Coordinates: 42.751990°N 93.198193°W

Location
- Hampton, Iowa Franklin and Butler counties United States
- Coordinates: 42.751990, -93.198193

District information
- Type: Local school district
- Grades: K–12
- Established: 1995
- Superintendent: Tim Felderman
- Schools: 4
- Budget: $19,141,000 (2020-21)
- NCES District ID: 1913470

Students and staff
- Students: 1298 (2022-23)
- Teachers: 100.14 FTE
- Staff: 106.92 FTE
- Student–teacher ratio: 12.96
- Athletic conference: North Central
- District mascot: Bulldogs
- Colors: Black and red

Other information
- Website: www.hdcsd.org

Hampton–Dumont Community School District is a rural public school district headquartered in Hampton, Iowa.

It is in Franklin and Butler counties, serving Hampton, Dumont, Hansell, and Aredale.

As of 2020, the district had 1,275 students.

== History ==
It was established on July 1, 1995, by the merger of the Dumont and Hampton school districts. The two districts had established a grade sharing agreement in 1989.

The district was scheduled to begin sharing a superintendent with the CAL Community School District in 2016. The school board of Hampton–Dumont CSD approved the arrangement, effective July 1 that year. In 2018, the Hampton district entered into a whole grade-sharing agreement with CAL, with the latter sending its secondary students to Hampton–Dumont.

== List of schools ==
- North Side Elementary
- South Side Elementary
- Hampton–Dumont Middle School
- Hampton–Dumont High School

== Hampton–Dumont High School ==
=== Athletics ===
The Bulldogs compete in the North Central Conference in the following sports:

- Cross country
- Volleyball
- Football
  - 2007 Class 2A state champions
- Basketball
  - Girls' 2-time state champions (1926, 1933)
- Swimming
- Wrestling
- Track and field
- Golf
  - 2007 boy's Class 2A state champions
  - 2007 coed Class 1A state champions
  - 2008 girls' Class 2A state champions
- Soccer
- Baseball
- Softball

== See also ==
- List of school districts in Iowa
- List of high schools in Iowa
