= National Register of Historic Places listings in Franklin County, Iowa =

Location of Franklin County in Iowa

This is a list of the National Register of Historic Places listings in Franklin County, Iowa.

This is intended to be a complete list of the properties and districts on the National Register of Historic Places in Franklin County, Iowa, United States. Latitude and longitude coordinates are provided for many National Register properties and districts; these locations may be seen together in a map.

There are 12 properties and districts listed on the National Register in the county, one of which is a National Historic Landmark

This National Park Service list is complete through NPS recent listings posted March 21, 2025.

	Name on the Register	Image	Date listed	Location	City or town	Description
1	Beeds Lake State Park, Civilian Conservation Corps Area	Beeds Lake State Park, Civilian Conservation Corps Area	November 15, 1990 (#90001672)	Junction of Iowa Highways 3 and 134; 42°46′15″N 93°14′21″W	Hampton	
2	H.E. Boehmler House	H.E. Boehmler House	December 13, 1991 (#91001829)	105 2nd St., SE. 42°44′26″N 93°12′18″W	Hampton	
3	Franklin County Courthouse	Franklin County Courthouse	August 13, 1976 (#76000772)	Central Ave. and 1st St., NW. 42°44′29″N 93°12′32″W	Hampton	
4	Franklin County G. A. R. Soldiers' Memorial Hall	Franklin County G. A. R. Soldiers' Memorial Hall	December 13, 1991 (#91001828)	3 Federal St., N. 42°44′29″N 93°12′25″W	Hampton	
5	Franklin County Sheriff's Residence and Jail	Franklin County Sheriff's Residence and Jail	August 16, 1996 (#96000896)	18 E. Central Ave. 42°44′31″N 93°12′23″W	Hampton	
6	Hampton Double Square Historic District	Hampton Double Square Historic District	August 28, 2003 (#03000834)	Roughly bounded by 2nd Ave., 1st Ave., the alley west of 1st St., and the alley east of Federal; 42°44′31″N 93°12′28″W	Hampton	
7	Dr. O.B. Harriman House	Dr. O.B. Harriman House	February 5, 1987 (#87000011)	26 10th St., NW. 42°44′31″N 93°13′14″W	Hampton	
8	Maysville Schoolhouse	Maysville Schoolhouse	June 17, 1981 (#81000237)	South of Hampton; 42°40′00″N 93°12′11″W	Hampton	
9	Reeve Electric Association Plant	Reeve Electric Association Plant	April 6, 1990 (#89002307)	Rural Route 1 southwest of Hampton; 42°41′14″N 93°13′58″W	Hampton	Designated a National Historic Landmark December 13, 2024.
10	Leander Reeve House	Leander Reeve House	July 17, 1979 (#79000896)	Southeast of Hampton on Iowa Highway 134; 42°40′36″N 93°09′49″W	Hampton	
11	St. John's Danish Evangelical Lutheran Church Historic District	St. John's Danish Evangelical Lutheran Church Historic District	October 13, 2015 (#15000726)	1207 Indigo Ave. 42°43′10″N 93°20′24″W	Hampton	
12	Herman Wood Round Barn	Herman Wood Round Barn	June 30, 1986 (#86001431)	U.S. Route 65; 42°33′28″N 93°15′02″W	Iowa Falls	

== See also ==
- List of National Historic Landmarks in Iowa
- National Register of Historic Places listings in Iowa
- Listings in neighboring counties: Butler, Cerro Gordo, Hardin, Wright
