= Hardin County Courthouse (Iowa) =

- U.S. National Register of Historic Places
- U.S. Historic district – Contributing property
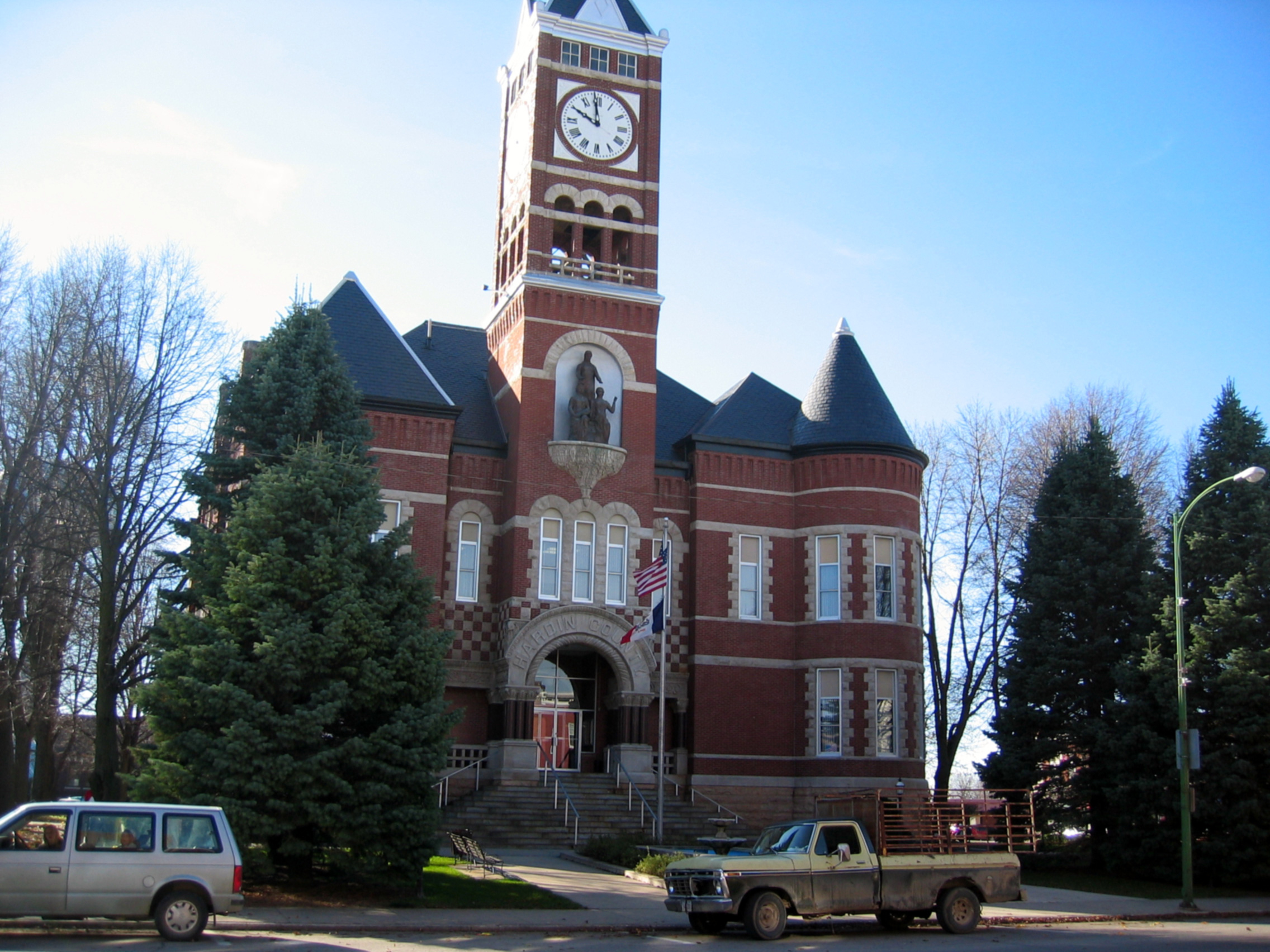

- Location within Iowa Location within the United States
- Interactive map showing the location of Hardin County Courthouse
- Location: Edgington Avenue; Eldora, Iowa
- Coordinates: 42°21′37″N 93°05′56″W
- Built: 1892
- Built by: J.F. Atkinson
- Architect: T.D. Allen
- Architectural style: Romanesque
- Part of: Eldora Downtown Historic District (ID09000297)
- MPS: County Courthouses in Iowa TR
- NRHP reference No.: 81000242
- Added to NRHP: July 2, 1981

The Hardin County Courthouse, located in Eldora, Iowa, United States, was built in 1892. The courthouse is the third building to house court functions and county administration. It was individually listed on the National Register of Historic Places in 1981. In 2010 it was included as a contributing property in the Eldora Downtown Historic District.

== History ==
The first courthouse in Hardin County was a two-story frame structure built in 1856. It was destroyed in a fire in October of the same year and a new courthouse replaced it the following year. The current courthouse opened in 1892 at a cost of $48,000.

In 1921, the roof and tower were damaged by a fire which spread from the adjacent Wisner Opera House. In 1967, the state fire marshall declared the structure unsafe. The following year, voters approved a bond sale to fund repairs. Work included replacing electrical, mechanical systems and windows; filling-in the central rotunda; replacing wood beams and floors with concrete and steel and installing an elevator. County workers vacated the building in July 1969 and returned to the renewed facility in October 1970. The final cost ran to $422,000, supplemented by private donations for landscaping.

== Architecture ==
T.D. Allen, architect of the courthouses in Dickinson and Franklin counties, designed Hardin's courthouse in the Romanesque Revival style with elements of other styles. The exterior of the building is faced with St. Louis pressed brick and rests on a raised ground story covered in rusticated pink Kasota stone. A checkerboard pattern of brick and rusticated stone adorns the area just above the main entrance and the façades of the east and west gables. The same stone frames the windows in modified Gibbs surrounds. Characteristic Richardsonian arches, supported by red granite columns, frame the north and south entrances. However, the corner turrets, hipped roof, cross gables, and hewn stone trim are more typical of the Queen Anne style. The building's 128-foot (39 m) bell tower is reminiscent of those in Italian town centers. Statues of Justice, Mercy and Liberty occupy the alcove beneath the bell tower. The semi-circular transoms on the middle east and west windows feature the seal of the State of Iowa in frosted glass. The significance of the courthouse is derived from its association with county government, and the political power and prestige of Eldora as the county seat.
