= Representative Rankin =

Representative Rankin may refer to:

- Arthur E. Rankin (1888–1962), member of the Iowa House of Representatives
- Bob Rankin (born 1942), former member of the Colorado House of Representatives
- Christopher Rankin (1788–1826), member of the US House of Representatives for Mississippi
- James Rankin (Ohio politician) (1926–1978), member of the Ohio House of Representatives
- Jeannette Rankin (1880–1973), member of the US House of Representatives for Montana
- John E. Rankin (1882–1960), member of the US House of Representative for Mississippi
- John M. Rankin (1873–1947), member of the Iowa House of Representatives
