= Maysville Schoolhouse =

- U.S. National Register of Historic Places
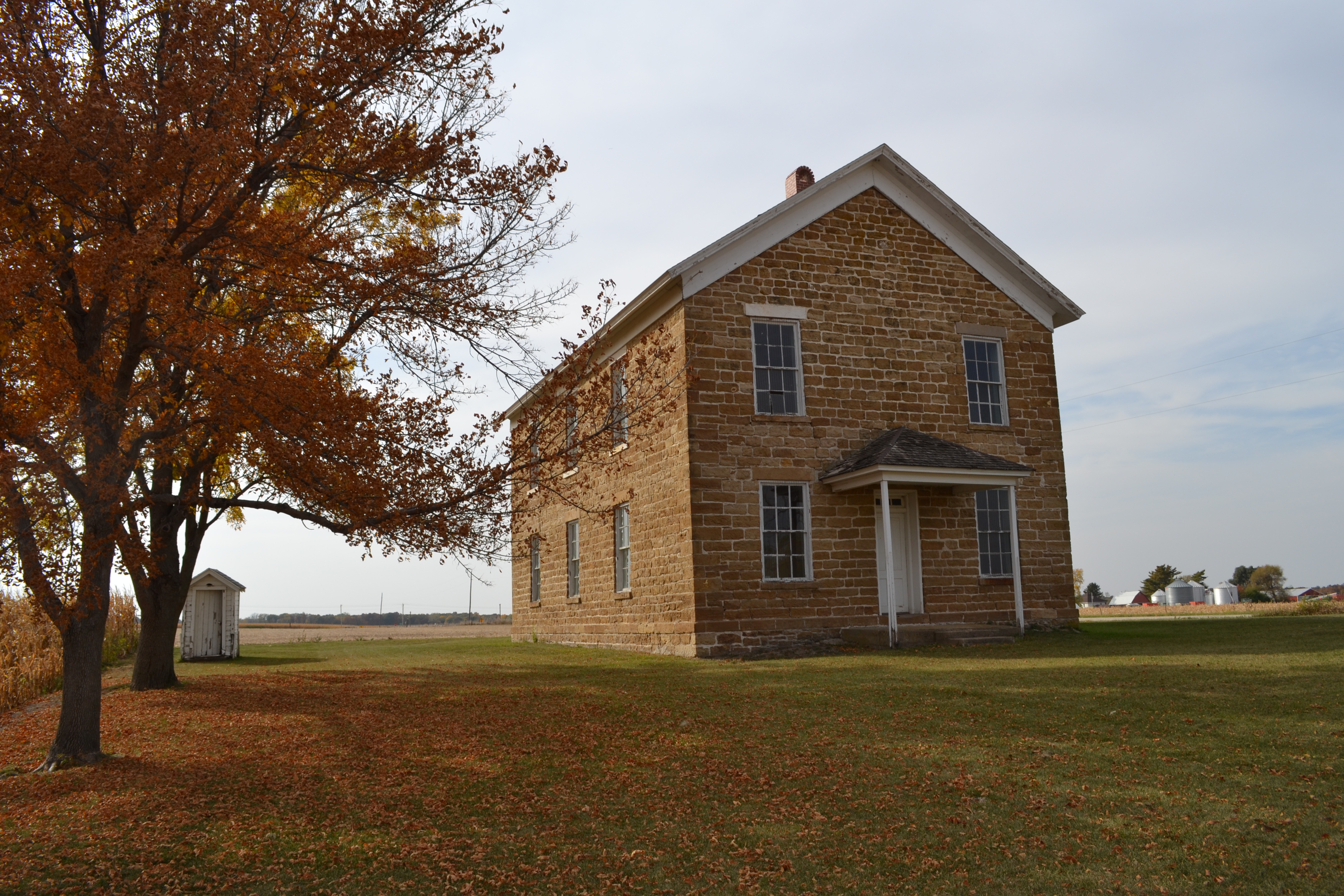

- Location within Iowa Location within the United States
- Location: South of Hampton, Iowa
- Coordinates: 42°40′0″N 93°11′56″W
- Area: less than one acre
- Built: 1867
- Built by: James Carn
- Architectural style: Vernacular
- NRHP reference No.: 81000237
- Added to NRHP: June 17, 1981

The Maysville Schoolhouse is a historic building located south of Hampton, Iowa, United States. The former school building is the only structure left from the defunct town of Maysville, the first town established in Franklin County. It was platted in 1865, and it was located on the stage line between Ackley and Hampton. Many merchants and professional moved into the community. This two-story, vernacular stone structure was built for $5,000 in 1867 by James Carn as a combination schoolhouse and meeting hall. The citizens of Maysville hoped that their community would be chosen as the county seat, but in 1872 the railroad went north to Hampton. In the 1880s the businessmen and professionals moved out, and the post office closed in 1890. By the turn of the 20th-century Maysville had become a ghost town. The school remained in operation until 1957, but the second floor hall continued to be used by various community organizations and the Methodist Church. The building was listed on the National Register of Historic Places in 1981.
