= First Congregational Church (Eldora, Iowa) =

- U.S. National Register of Historic Places
- U.S. Historic district – Contributing property
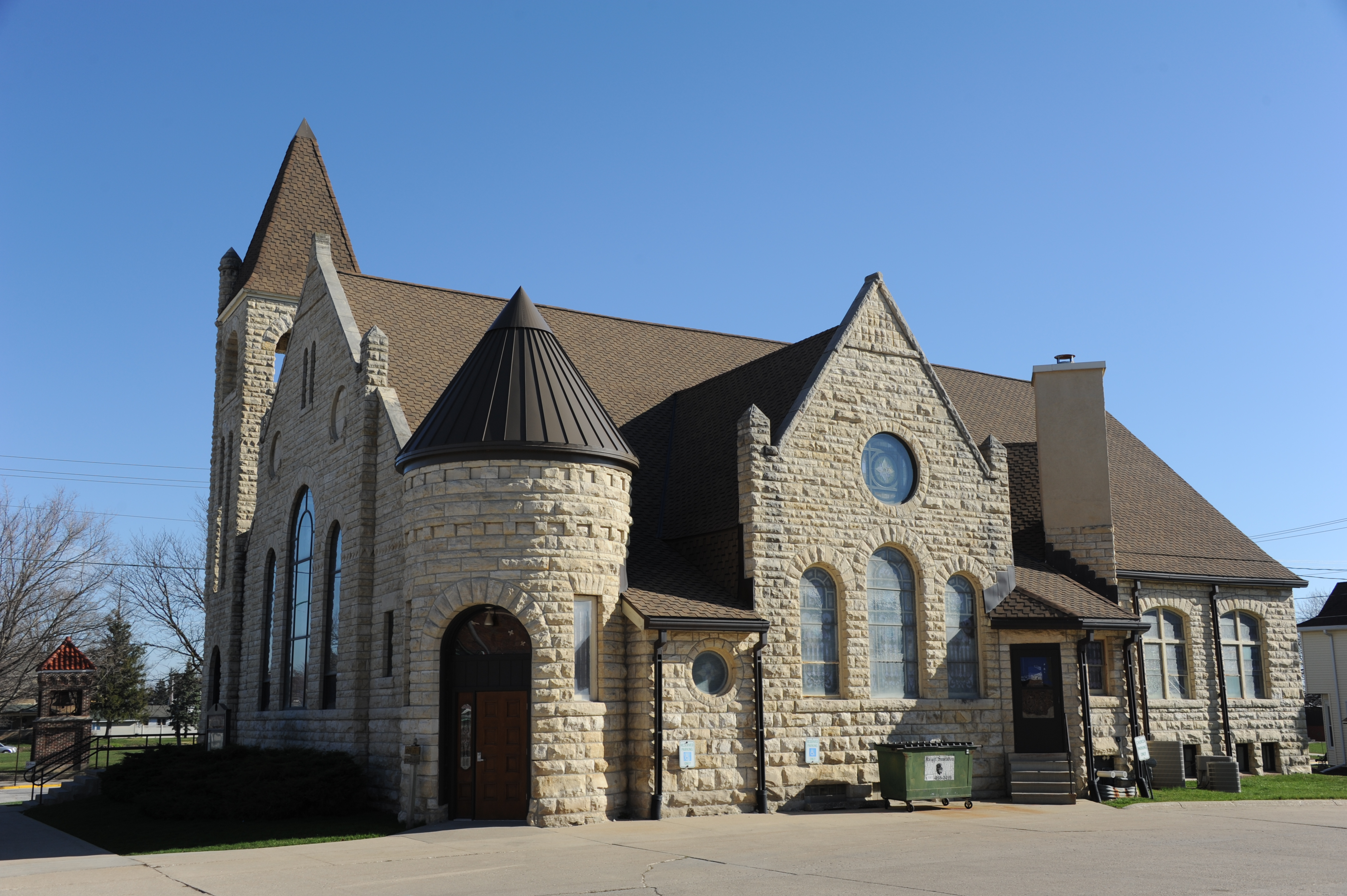
- First Congregational Church

- Location within Iowa Location within the United States
- Location: 1209 12th St. Eldora, Iowa
- Coordinates: 42°21′41″N 93°5′52″W
- Built: 1894
- Architect: C.A. Dunham, John F. Atkinson
- Architectural style: Romanesque
- Part of: Eldora Downtown Historic District (ID09000297)
- NRHP reference No.: 96001372
- Added to NRHP: December 4, 1996

First Congregational Church is a congregation of the United Church of Christ located in Eldora, Iowa, United States. The congregation was organized in 1868 and the church building was individually listed on the National Register of Historic Places in 1996. In 2010 it was included as a contributing property in the Eldora Downtown Historic District in 2010.

== Architecture ==
The church building was designed in the late Victorian, Romanesque Revival style by Charles Durham and was built from 1893–1894. The church is constructed of LeGrand hammer dressed limestone. It measures 47 by 90 feet and the tower rises 57 and a half feet above the cornice line. The door sills and steps are made of blue stone and the interior is finished in antique oak and hard pine. Stained glass windows help to illuminate the interior.

== See also ==
Other properties of religious function on the National Register of Historic Places in Hardin County:

- Honey Creek Friends' Meetinghouse
- St. Matthew's by the Bridge Episcopal Church
