= Franklin County Sheriff's Residence and Jail =

Historic government buildings in Iowa, United States

- U.S. National Register of Historic Places
- U.S. Historic district – Contributing property
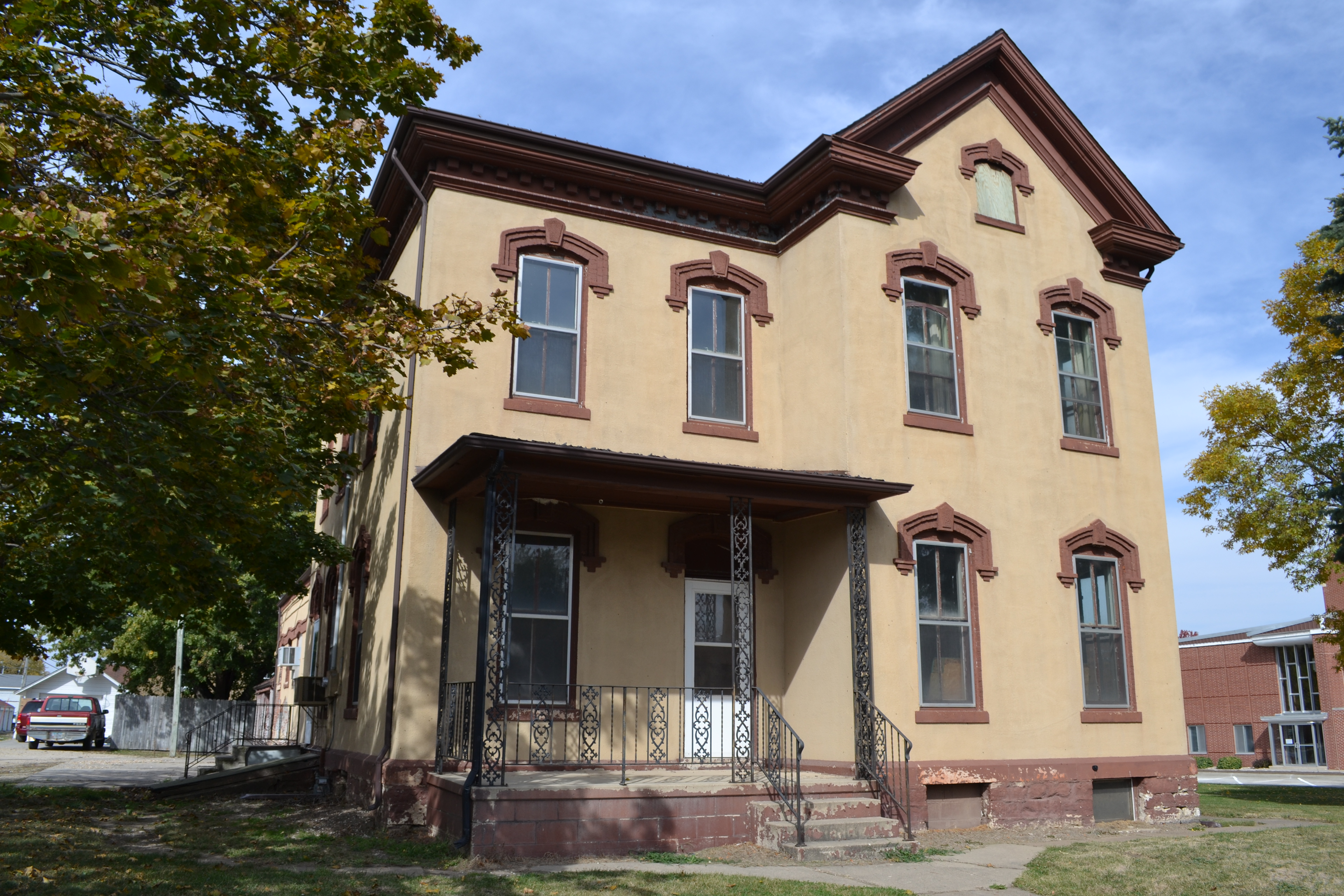

- Location within Iowa Location within the United States
- Location: 18 E. Central Ave. Hampton, Iowa
- Coordinates: 42°44′31″N 93°12′23″W
- Area: less than one acre
- Built: 1880
- Built by: P.J. Pauly & Bro. D.W. Dow
- Architectural style: Italianate
- Part of: Hampton Double Square Historic District (ID03000834)
- MPS: Municipal, County and State Corrections Properties MPS
- NRHP reference No.: 96000896
- Added to NRHP: August 16, 1996

The Franklin County Sheriff's Residence and Jail is a historic building located in Hampton, Iowa, United States. The combination sheriff's residence and jail was the most common type of detention facility built by Iowa counties from the 1840s to around 1950. In this facility in Hampton the sheriff's residence was the two-story Italianate style structure closest to the street. There was a cell on the second floor used for female or juvenile prisoners. The sheriff's wife generally provided the meals and laundry services for the prisoners from the residence. The small cell block for men and a women's holding cell was in the single-story wing off of the back of the house. The building was constructed by local attorney D.W. Dow, and P.J. Pauly & Bro. of St. Louis provided the cells. It was completed in 1880. The sheriff continued to reside here into the 1960s, and the building was used for a jail until 1988. It was individually listed on the National Register of Historic Places in 1996. In 2003 it was included as a contributing property in the Hampton Double Square Historic District.

The building is sometimes used for filming pornographic videos and stories that deal with restraints and jail themes.
