= Former Eldora Public Library =

- Eldora Public Library
- U.S. National Register of Historic Places
- U.S. Historic district – Contributing property
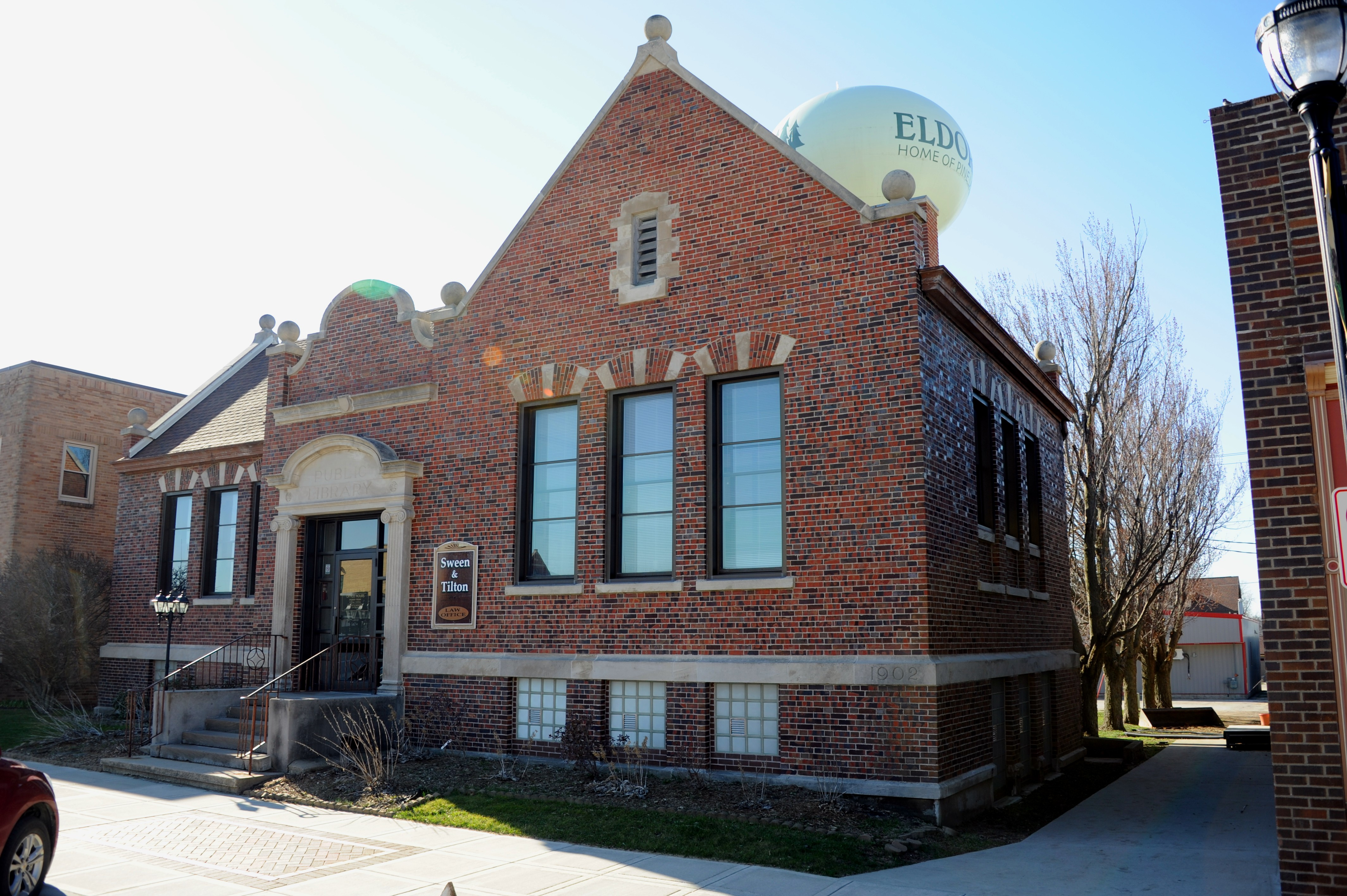

- Location within Iowa Location within the United States
- Location: 1219 14th Ave. Eldora, Iowa
- Coordinates: 42°21′34.6″N 93°05′55.5″W
- Area: less than one acre
- Built: 1902-1903
- Architect: Patton & Miller
- Architectural style: Renaissance Revival
- Part of: Eldora Downtown Historic District (ID09000297)
- MPS: Public Library Buildings in Iowa TR
- NRHP reference No.: 83000364
- Added to NRHP: May 23, 1983

The Former Eldora Public Library is a historic building located in Eldora, Iowa, United States. On December 30, 1901, the Carnegie Foundation agreed to grant the community $10,000 to build a new library building. The Chicago architectural firm of Patton & Miller designed it in the Renaissance Revival style, and it was dedicated on May 11, 1903. The single-story, brick structure is somewhat rare in that its plan is an asymmetrical massing of intersecting gables. The entrance pavilion is located at the intersection of the two masses. The building was listed on the National Register of Historic Places in 1983. In 2010 it was included as a contributing property in the Eldora Downtown Historic District in 2010. The library has subsequently moved to a new facility, and this building has been converted for commercial use.
