= T. Dudley Allen =

American architect

Truman Dudley Allen
- Born: April 16, 1829; Greenwich, New York
- Died: October 7, 1897 (aged 68); Racine, Wisconsin
- Occupation: Architect

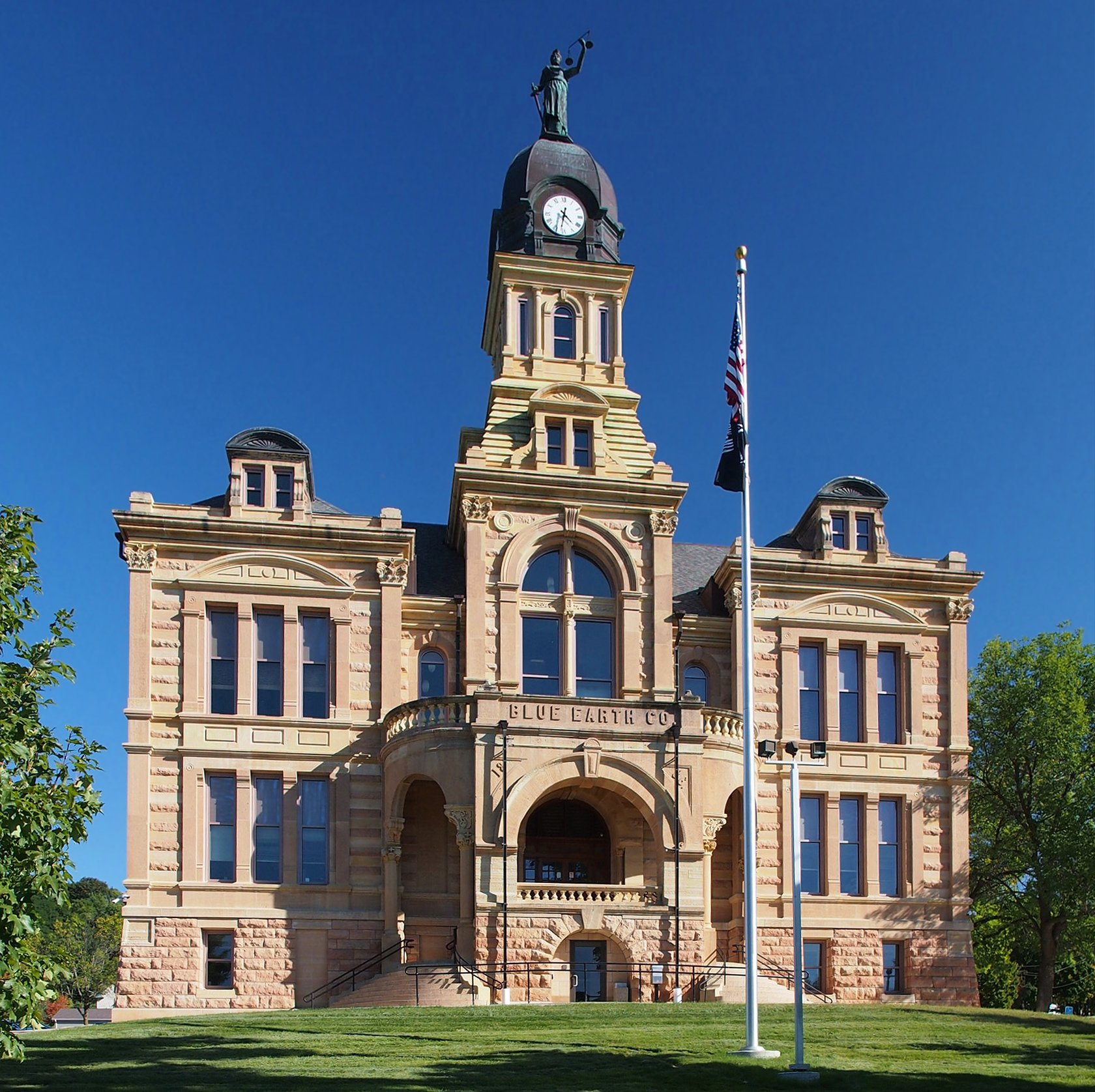
Blue Earth County Courthouse, Mankato, Minnesota, 1886.

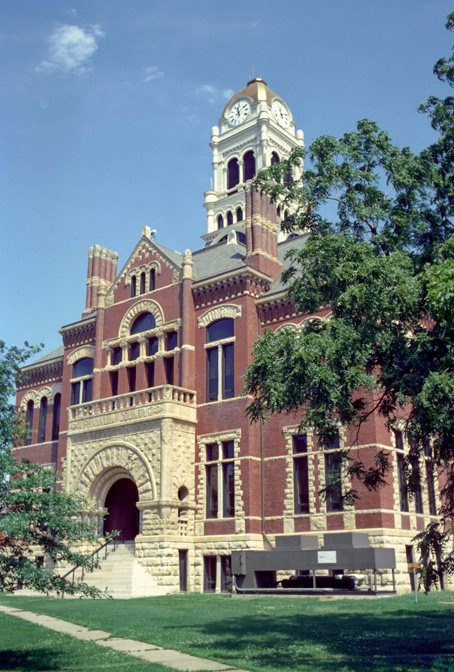
Franklin County Courthouse, Hampton, Iowa, 1890.

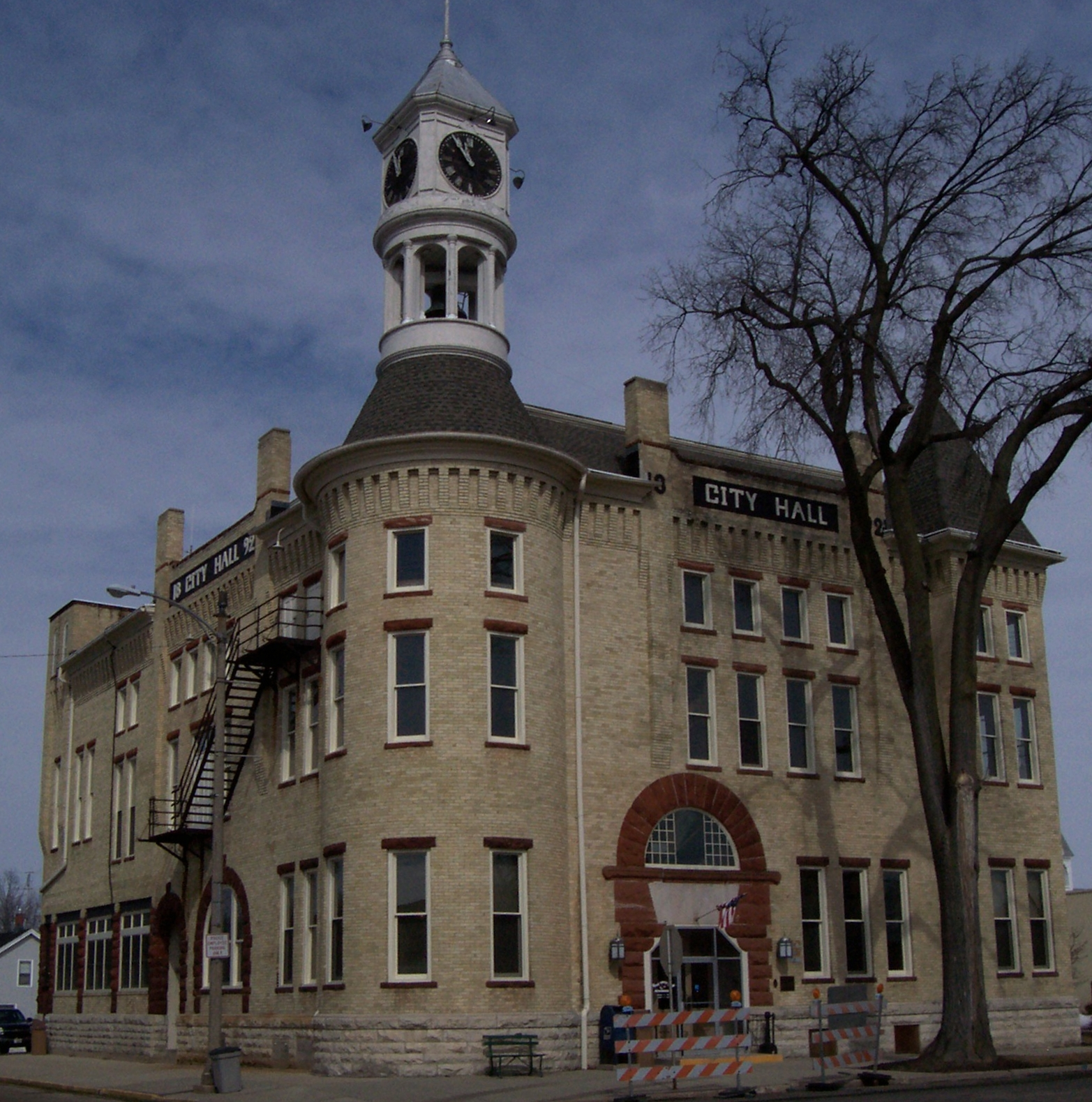
Columbus City Hall, Columbus, Wisconsin, 1891.

Truman Dudley Allen (1829-1897), commonly known as T. D. Allen or T. Dudley Allen, was an American architect. He moved frequently throughout his career, practicing in Iowa, Minnesota, Nebraska, Ohio and Wisconsin, but most of his prominent works date from his residence in Minneapolis at the close of his career.

== Early life and career ==
Truman Dudley Allen was born April 16, 1829, in Greenwich, New York. In 1848 he moved to western Pennsylvania, where he began to study architecture. He continued these studies in northern Ohio, eventually starting an architectural practice in Medina. In 1872 he went to Cleveland, but soon afterwards went further west, to Oshkosh, Wisconsin, and then Council Bluffs, Iowa. He remained there until 1879, when he relocated to Grand Island, Nebraska. He then went to Lincoln in 1882, where he remained until 1885. Later that year he was in Anoka, Minnesota, and was in Minneapolis by 1886.

When he arrived in Minneapolis he associated himself with A. Leonard Haley, (Note: Haley's father, Joseph, was an architect who had begun practicing in Minneapolis in 1869. The younger Haley would move to Los Angeles in 1888.) who had initiated his practice in Minneapolis in late 1885. Haley & Allen lasted for only a few months, and by 1887 was instead associated with Homer L. Patten, though Allen & Patten too only lasted a few months. In about 1892 Allen began practicing as T. D. Allen & Company, and retired in 1893, when ill health obligated it. He spent a year in Florida before coming back west to Racine, Wisconsin, to live with his daughter, Wrennie, and her husband. He died in Racine, October 7, 1897.

== Personal life ==
In 1866 Allen married Harriet E. Hinckley of Warren County, Pennsylvania. They had four children, and Harriet Allen died in Grand Island in 1880. In 1882 he remarried, to Lucinda Thorspeckan of Omaha, though she may have died by 1885. He married a third time in 1886, to Carrie E. Mullekin of St. Paul.

One of his sons, Glenn Allen, would go on to be a successful architect in Texas and California.

In 1891 Allen's daughter, Wrennie, married David R. Davis, an employee of her father's. In 1892 they moved to Racine, Wisconsin, where Davis established his own practice. Allen was living with his daughter and son-in-law at the time of his death.

== Legacy ==
A number of his works are listed on the U.S. National Register of Historic Places.

== Reception ==
If Allen's work was ever substantially noted in the national architectural press, it is not apparent. In the twentieth century, several writers have commented on his later works in the Richardsonian Romanesque style. In their contribution to a 1978 study of American courthouse architecture, Henry-Russell Hitchcock and William Seale found Allen's courthouses of the 1880s and 1890s to be "crass and vulgar...very remote from Richardson's own work," which sets the tone. This is echoed by Kathryn Bishop Eckert in her 2000 study of sandstone architecture around Lake Superior, noting in particular an impression of a lack of planning.

In their 1993 survey of the architecture of Iowa, David Gebhard and Gerald Mansheim are more diplomatic, instead calling Allen's approach "rather personal." They identify the Franklin County Courthouse (1890) as a high point.

== Architectural works ==
Year	Building	Address	City	State	Notes	Image	Reference
1871	Lincoln School	144 N Broadway St	Medina	Ohio	Demolished.		
1873	Medina County Courthouse	99 Public Sq	Medina	Ohio	Listed on the National Register of Historic Places in 1970.		
1875	German Methodist Church (former)	101 W Tenth Ave	Oshkosh	Wisconsin			
1880	Whittier School	Third Ave	Kearney	Nebraska	Demolished.		
1882	Polk County Courthouse	400 Hawkeye St	Osceola	Nebraska	Demolished.		
1883	Stanton County Courthouse	804 Ivy St	Stanton	Nebraska	Demolished.		
1886	Blue Earth County Courthouse (Note: Credited to the firm of Haley & Allen.)	204 S 5th St	Mankato	Minnesota	Listed on the National Register of Historic Places in 1980.		
1887	Ramsey County Courthouse	524 Fourth Ave NE	Devils Lake	North Dakota	Demolished.		
1887	Rock County Courthouse	204 E Brown St	Luverne	Minnesota	Listed on the National Register of Historic Places in 1977.		
1888	College Hall, Dakota Wesleyan University	1200 W University Ave	Mitchell	South Dakota	Burned in 1955.		
1888	Merrill City Hall	717 E 2nd St	Merrill	Wisconsin	Listed on the National Register of Historic Places in 1978.		
1889	Hand County Courthouse	415 W First Ave	Miller	South Dakota	Demolished.		
1889	Richland County Courthouse	181 W Seminary St	Richland	Wisconsin			
1890	Dickinson County Courthouse	1802 Hill Ave	Spirit Lake	Iowa	Listed on the National Register of Historic Places in 1981, but demolished in 2006.		
1890	Franklin County Courthouse	12 1st Ave NW	Hampton	Iowa	Listed on the National Register of Historic Places in 1976.		
1890	Kandiyohi County Courthouse	505 Becker Ave SW	Willmar	Minnesota	Demolished.		
1891	Columbus City Hall	105 N Dickason Blvd	Columbus	Wisconsin	Listed on the National Register of Historic Places in 1979.		
1892	Hardin County Courthouse	1215 Edgington Ave	Eldora	Iowa	Listed on the National Register of Historic Places in 1981.		
1892	Luling School	1010 Huron Street	Manitowoc	Wisconsin	Listed on the National Register of Historic Places in 2025.		
1892	Old Main, Mayville State University	330 3rd St NE	Mayville	North Dakota			
1892	Steele County Courthouse	111 Main St E	Owatonna	Minnesota	Listed on the National Register of Historic Places in 1976.		
1893	Walker School	Washington Ave	Washburn	Wisconsin	Burned in 1947.		
