= Columbus City Hall (Wisconsin) =

- U.S. National Register of Historic Places
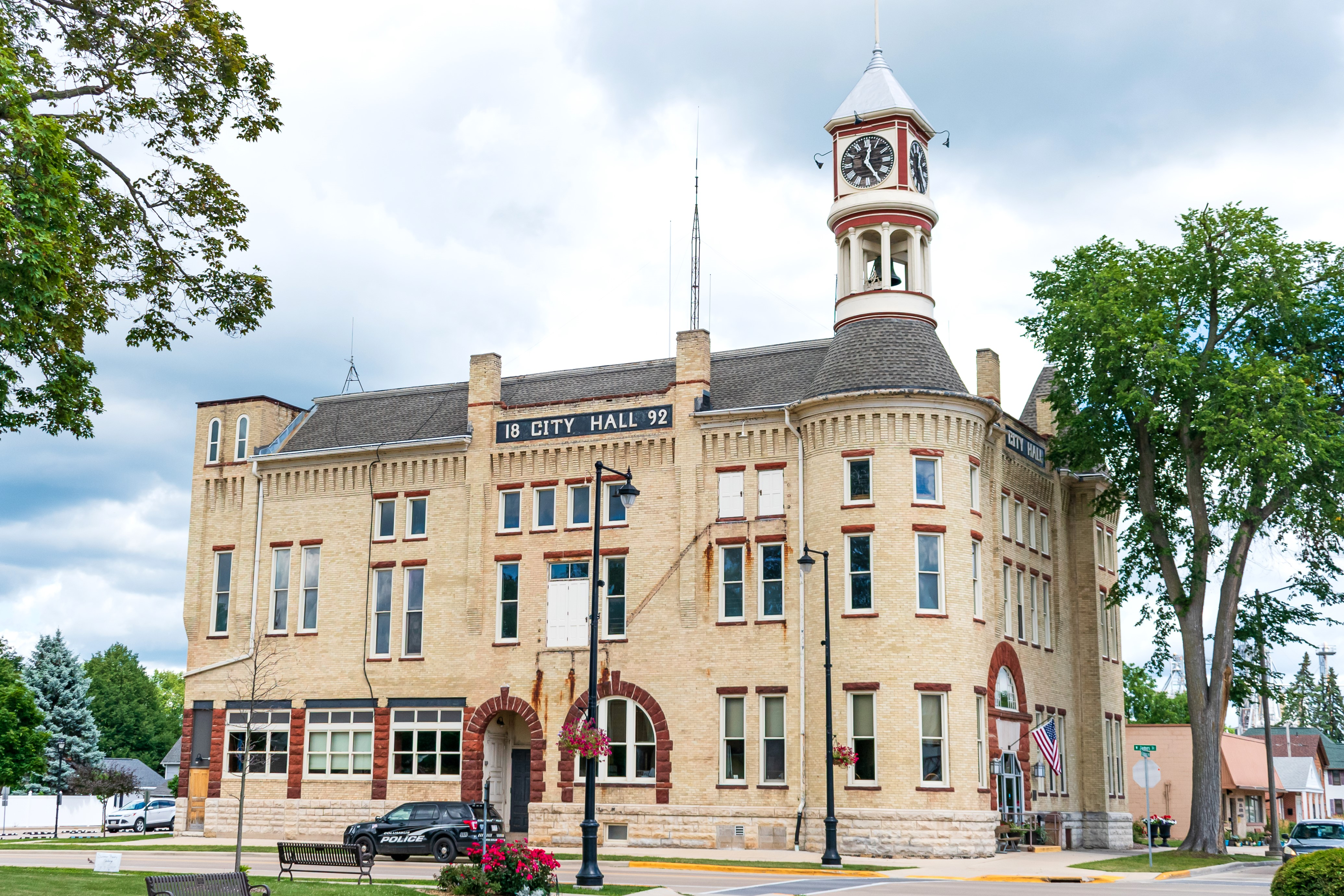

- Location within Wisconsin Location within the United States
- Location: 105 N. Dickason St., Columbus, Wisconsin
- Coordinates: 43°20′15″N 89°0′56″W
- Area: 0.1 acres (0.040 ha)
- Built: 1892
- Architect: T. D. Allen
- Architectural style: Late Victorian
- NRHP reference No.: 79000065
- Added to NRHP: September 4, 1979

The Columbus City Hall was added to the National Register of Historic Places in 1979.

It was designed by architect Truman Dudley Allen.

== History ==
In addition to the offices of the city government, when the building opened in 1892, it also housed the police department, the fire department, the jail and the city library. A public auditorium is located on in the building. It has hosted traveling theater troupes, class plays, graduation ceremonies and served as a movie theater until 1917 when a separate theater opened in the city.

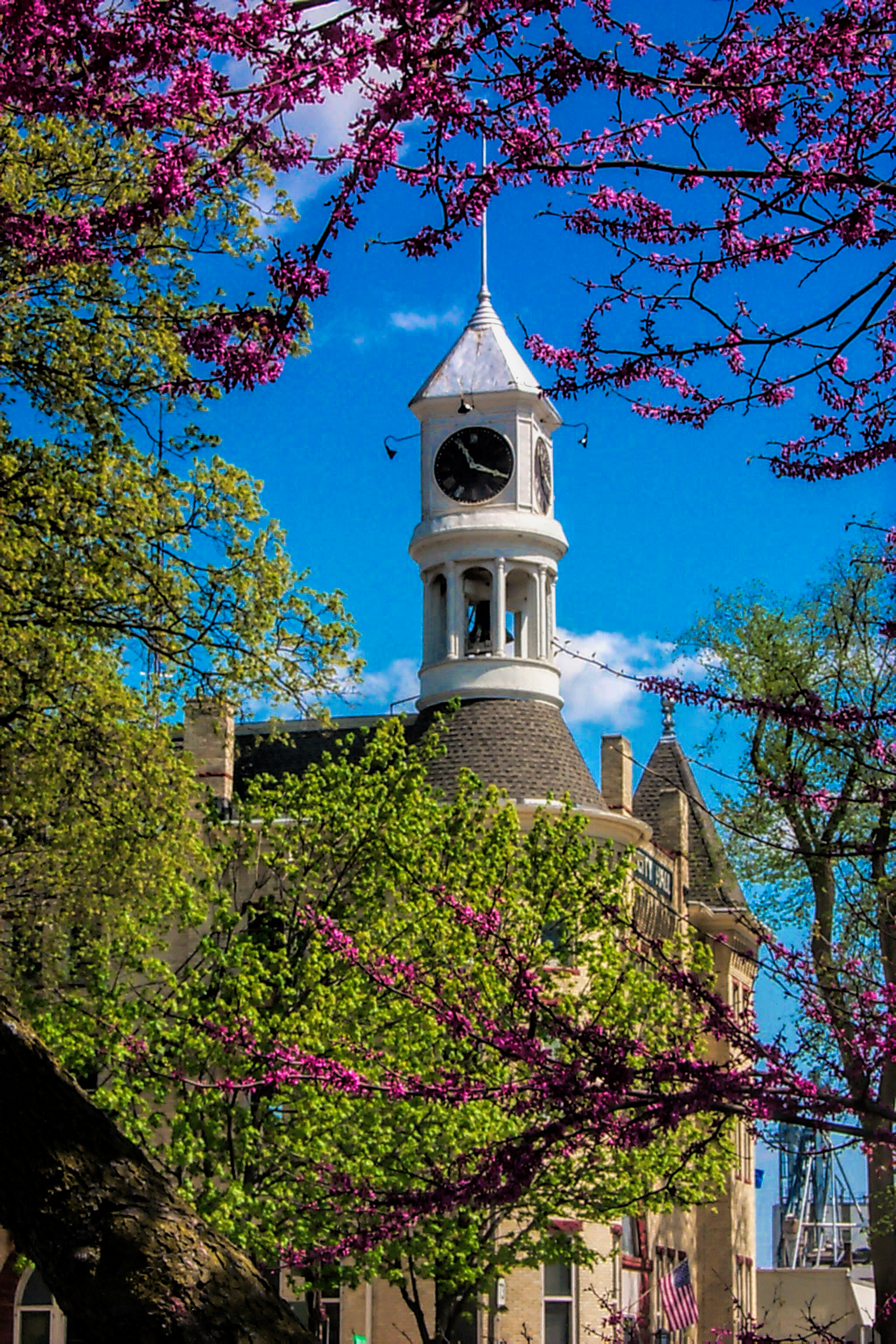
Historic City Hall, Columbus, Wisconsin
