= Hampton Double Square Historic District =

Historic district in Iowa, United States

- U.S. National Register of Historic Places
- U.S. Historic district
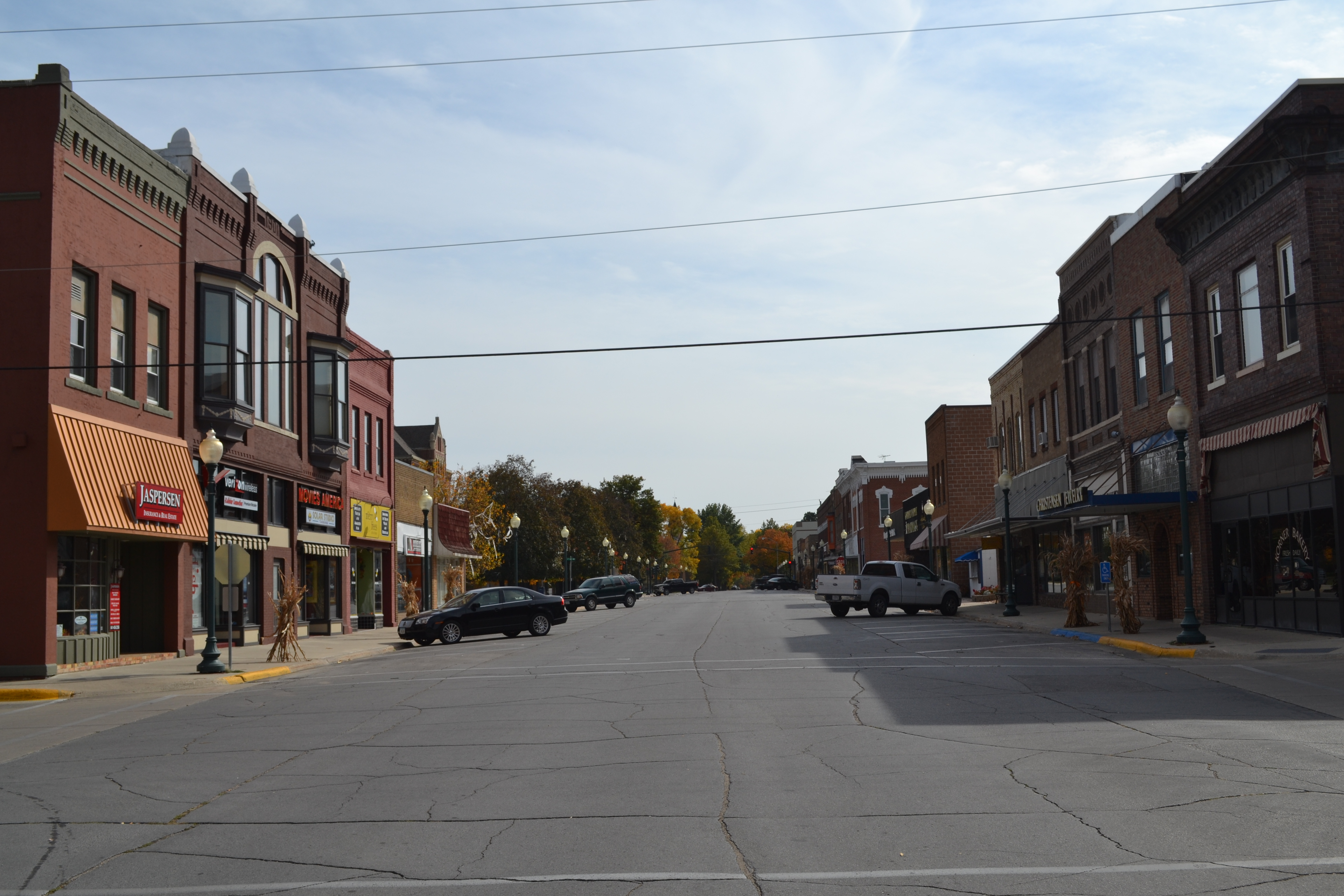

- Location within Iowa Location within the United States
- Location: Roughly bounded by 2nd Ave., 1st Ave., the alley west of 1st St., and the alley east of Federal, Hampton, Iowa
- Coordinates: 42°44′31″N 93°12′28″W
- Area: 28 acres (11 ha)
- Architect: Liebbe, Nourse & Rasmussen; T. D. Allen
- Architectural style: Italianate
- NRHP reference No.: 03000834
- Added to NRHP: August 28, 2003

The Hampton Double Square Historic District is a historic district located in Hampton, Iowa, United States. It has been listed on the National Register of Historic Places since 2003. At the time of its nomination it contained 43 resources, which included 28 contributing buildings, two contributing sites, 10 non-contributing buildings, one non-contributing site, one non-contributing structures, and one non-contributing object. The town of Hampton was laid out by H. P. Allen, who was the county surveyor, in June 1856. The original plat was eight blocks by eight blocks in the shape of an "L". Near the center of the "L" was the two-block, or double, square. While many county seats in Iowa have a courthouse square, the double square is a rarity. Four double squares were platted in Iowa, but only those in Hampton and Sidney survived their early period of development. Estherville's square was platted as a four-block square, but its development created a double square instead. Hampton has the only symmetrical double square plan in the state. The double square exemplifies the two primary functions of a public square, both commercial and public development.

The district's period of significance is from 1856, when it was of platted, to 1935 when the last public building was constructed. Building usage is largely commercial with a few public/government buildings, and the Congregational Church. The buildings are largely two stories tall and constructed of brick in the styles that were popular at the time. Many of the commercial blocks are Italianate in design. The Franklin County Sheriff's Residence and Jail (1880), the Franklin County G. A. R. Soldiers' Memorial Hall (1890; Edward Carl Keifer), and the Franklin County Courthouse (1891; T. D. Allen) are individually listed on the National Register of Historic Places.
