= Blue Earth County Courthouse =

- Historic Blue Earth County Courthouse
- U.S. National Register of Historic Places
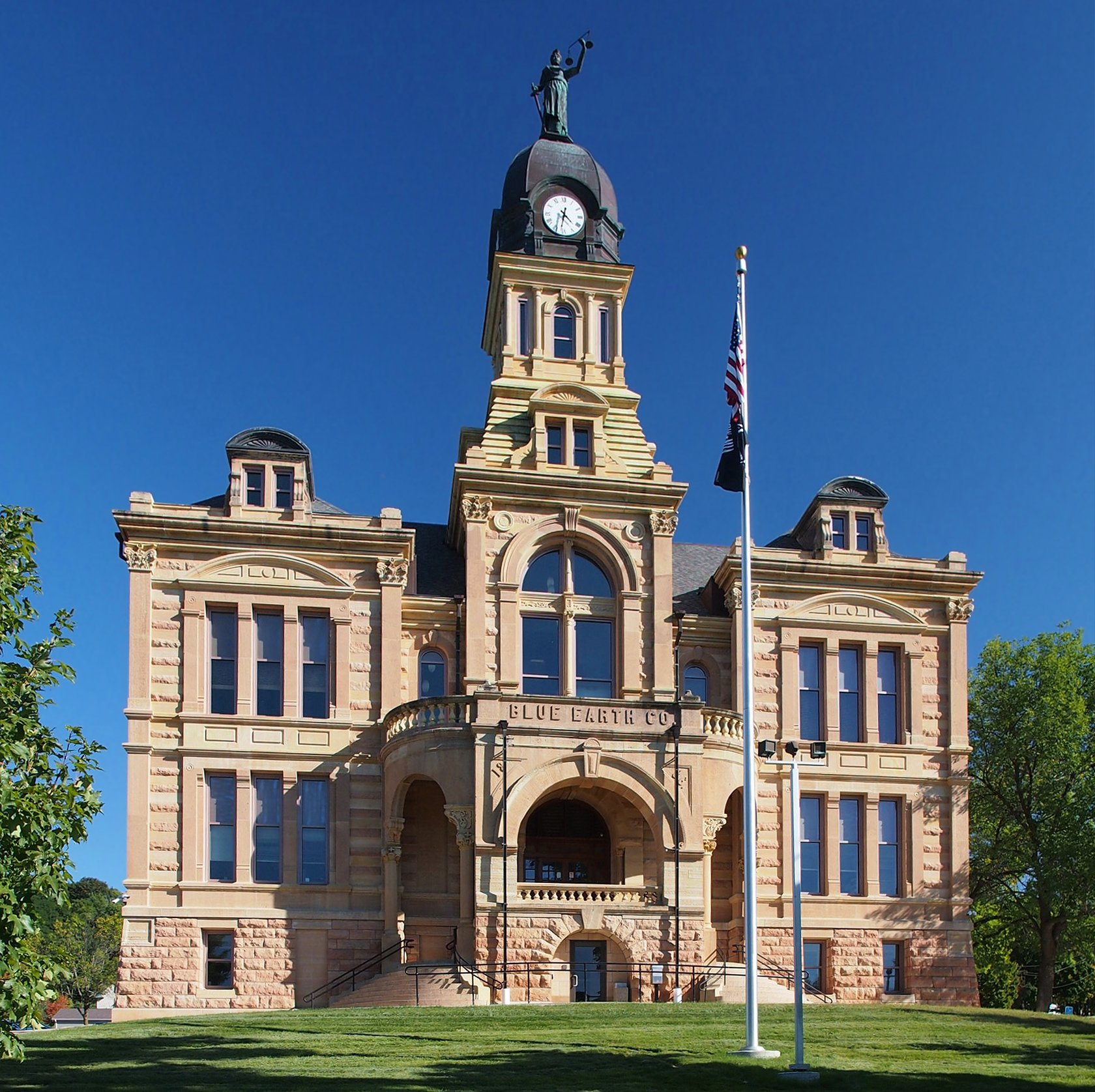
- The Blue Earth County Courthouse from the northwest

- Location within Minnesota Location within the United States
- Interactive map showing the location of Blue Earth County Courthouse
- Location: 204 S. 5th St., Mankato, Minnesota
- Coordinates: 44°9′49″N 93°59′57″W
- Built: 1886–9
- Architect: Haley & Allen; Ring & Tobin
- Architectural style: Late 19th And 20th Century Revivals
- MPS: Blue Earth County MRA
- NRHP reference No.: 80001940
- Added to NRHP: July 28, 1980

The Blue Earth County Historic Courthouse is the former courthouse of Blue Earth County, Minnesota, United States, in the city of Mankato, the county seat. It is listed on the National Register of Historic Places. Court services were moved from the Historic Courthouse to the Blue Earth County Justice Center, located at 401 Carver Rd, Mankato, Minnesota in 2009.

== History ==
The building, completed in 1889, was the second courthouse in the county. The first courthouse in the county, a 20-by-24 foot one-story stone building, was built in 1857.

According to local Welsh-language poet James D. Price, whose Bardic name was "Ap Dewi", the first Eisteddfod held in Mankato took place at the Blue Earth County Courthouse on January 1, 1873.

By the mid 1800s, the county commissioners felt that the previous buildings were a "disgrace and gave strangers that we were behind the times. That the county was either poverty stricken or greatly lacking in enterprise." At this time, there was a debate on whether to relocate the county seat to Garden City or have it remain in Mankato.

After much debate, a building was started in 1886. The new building, designed by Minneapolis architects Haley & Allen, combined a Second Empire roof and dome with Italianate features. The stone was provided by a local quarry, with various techniques giving it both rusticated and ashlar surfaces. The copper-sheathed dome is capped with a statue of Lady Justice.

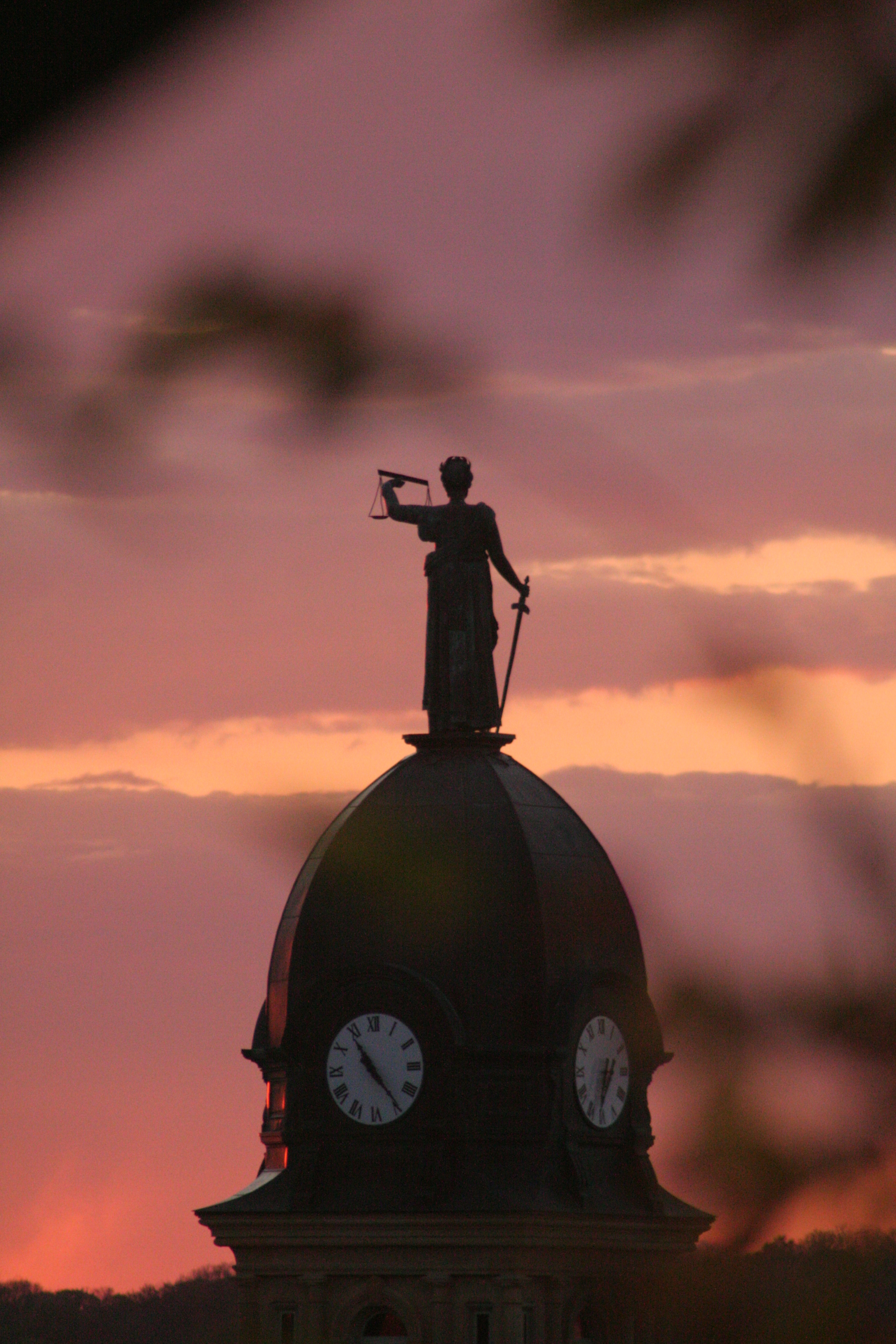
Lady Justice

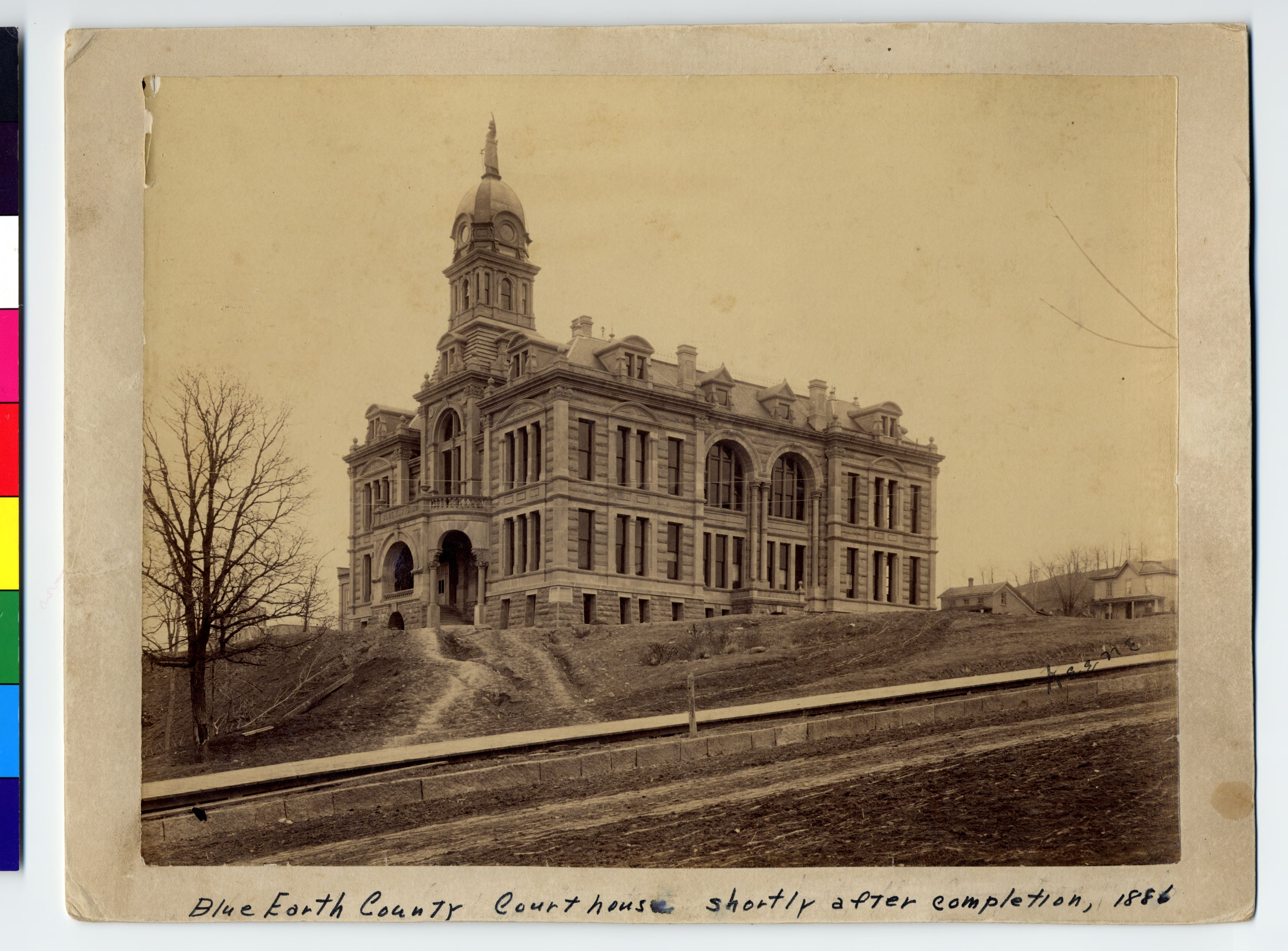
Blue Earth County Courthouse
