= Eldora Downtown Historic District =

Historic district in Iowa, United States

- U.S. National Register of Historic Places
- U.S. Historic district
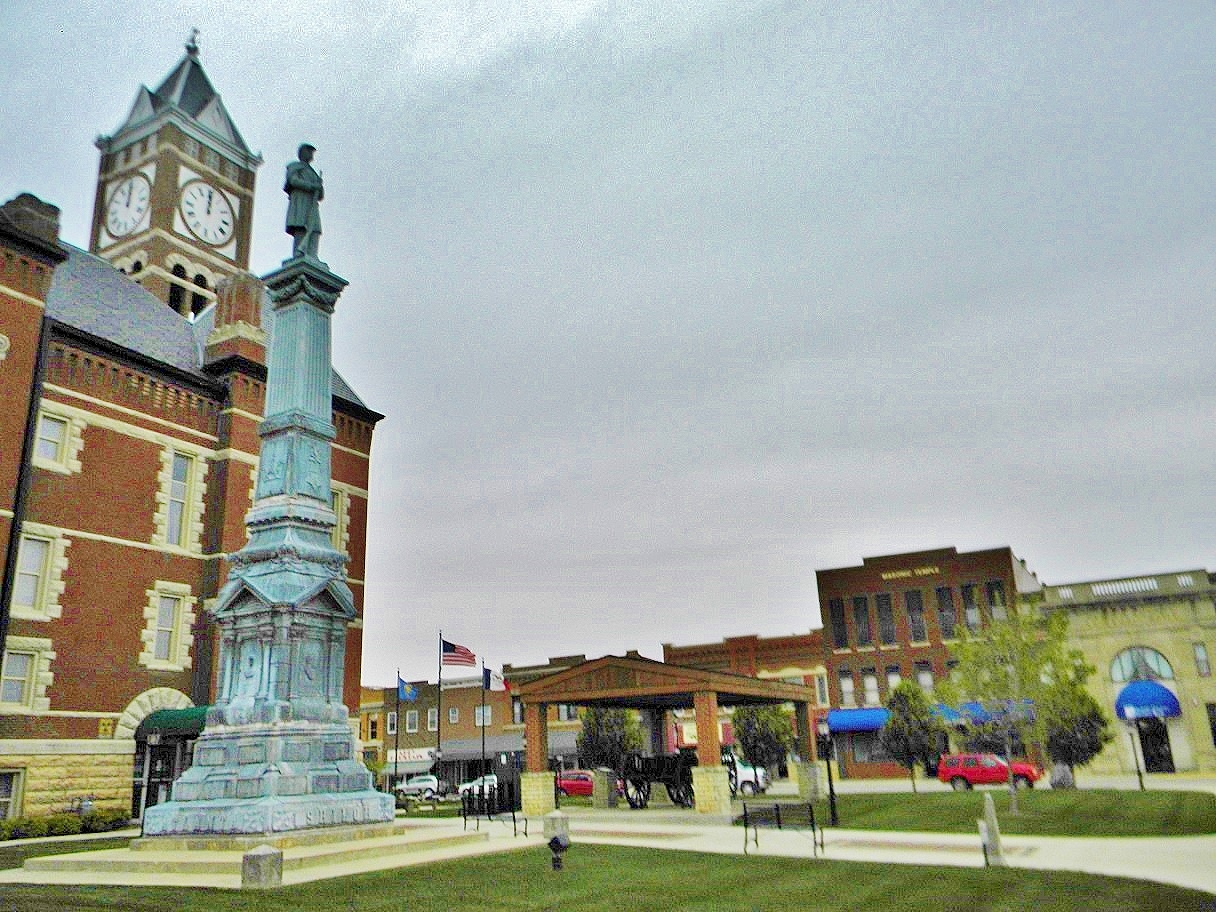
- The Hardin County courthouse is located in the downtown area in Eldora

- Location within Iowa Location within the United States
- Location: Approximately ten blocks in downtown Eldora around the courthouse square
- Coordinates: 42°21′36.7″N 93°05′56.1″W
- Area: 11 acres (4.5 ha)
- Architectural style: Late Victorian; Late 19th and 20th Century Revivals
- NRHP reference No.: 09000297
- Added to NRHP: May 12, 2009

The Eldora Downtown Historic District is a nationally recognized historic district located in Eldora, Iowa, United States. It was listed on the National Register of Historic Places in 2009. At the time of its nomination the district consisted of 84 resources, including 65 contributing buildings, one contributing site, three contributing objects and 15 non-contributing buildings. The district takes in the city's central business district, which also includes its governmental, educational, and religious activities. It is located in the original town plat from 1853. Development began around the public square and spread out from there. The present building stock is second generation at the earliest. The oldest extant buildings were built in the 1870s, although the greatest number of buildings were constructed in the 1890s. There were also peak years of construction in the 1910s, and the late 1930s and 1940s. The commercial buildings generally range from one to two stories, but the tallest structure is three stories in height. They are primarily composed of brick construction. Late Victorian and various revival styles from the late 19th and 20th centuries are dominant. The non-commercial buildings include four government buildings, four churches, three residences, a hospital, and a school.

Three buildings that were individually listed on the National Register of Historic Places are contributing properties in the district. They include: the Hardin County Courthouse (1892), the First Congregational Church (1894), and the former Eldora Public Library (1903). The three contributing objects include the Civil War monument, a Civil War cannon, and a World War I gun. They are all located on the courthouse square, which is the contributing site.
