= H.E. Boehmler House =

Historic house in Iowa, United States

- U.S. National Register of Historic Places
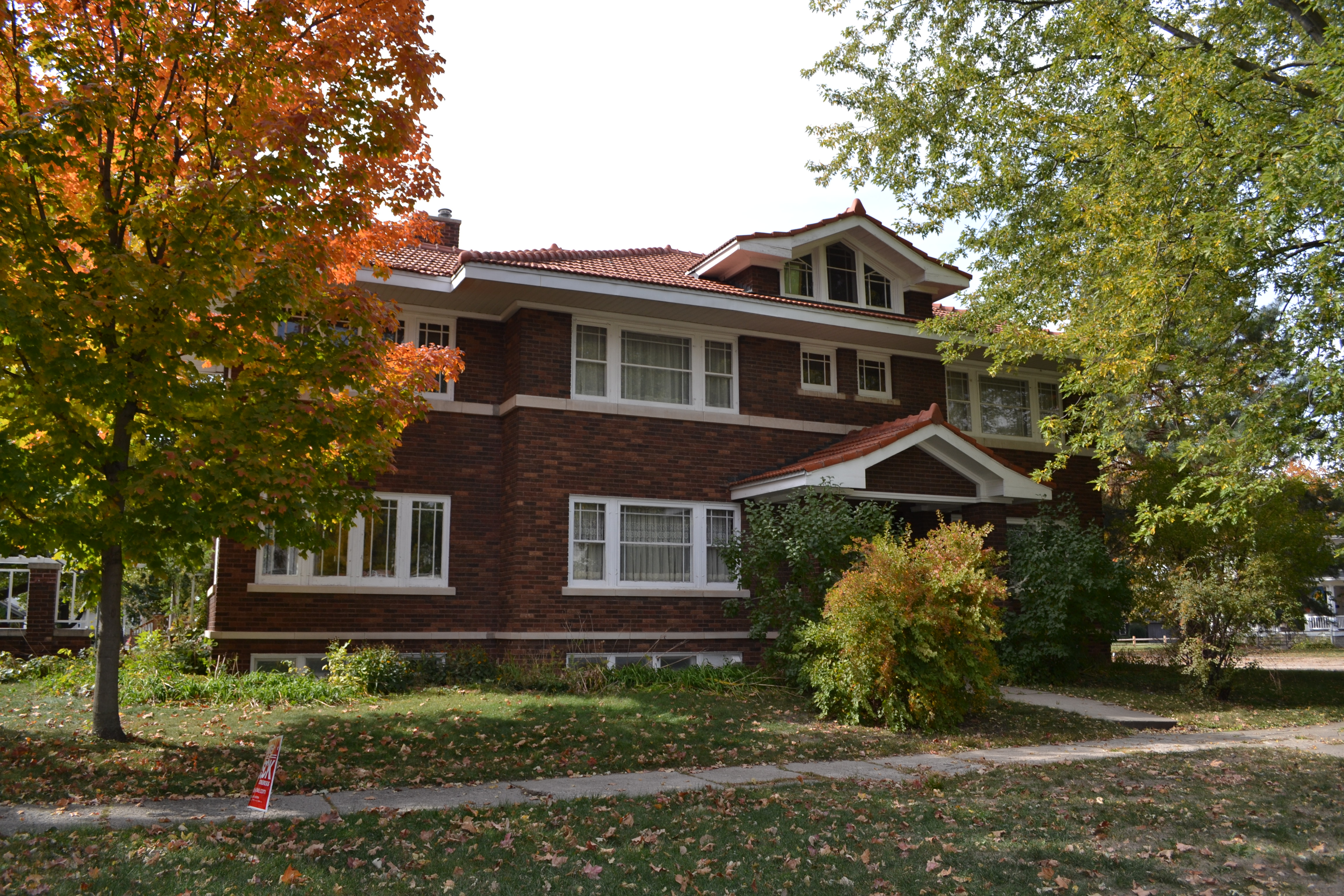

- Location within Iowa Location within the United States
- Location: 105 2nd St., SE. Hampton, Iowa
- Coordinates: 42°44′26″N 93°12′18″W
- Area: less than one acre
- Built: 1915
- Architect: J.H. Jeffers; Einar Broaten
- Architectural style: Prairie School
- NRHP reference No.: 91001829
- Added to NRHP: December 13, 1991

The H.E. Boehmler House is a historic dwelling located in Hampton, Iowa, United States. Boehmler was a pharmacist, and his wife conducted art classes in their home. This house was built in 1915, and designed in the Prairie School style by J.H. Jeffers and Einar Broaten. The two-story brick structure features banded windows, belt courses, a low hipped roof, wide eaves, and a connecting arbor-and-fence extension from the house to the garage. It was listed on the National Register of Historic Places in 1991.
