= Franklin County G. A. R. Soldiers' Memorial Hall (Iowa) =

- U.S. National Register of Historic Places
- U.S. Historic district – Contributing property
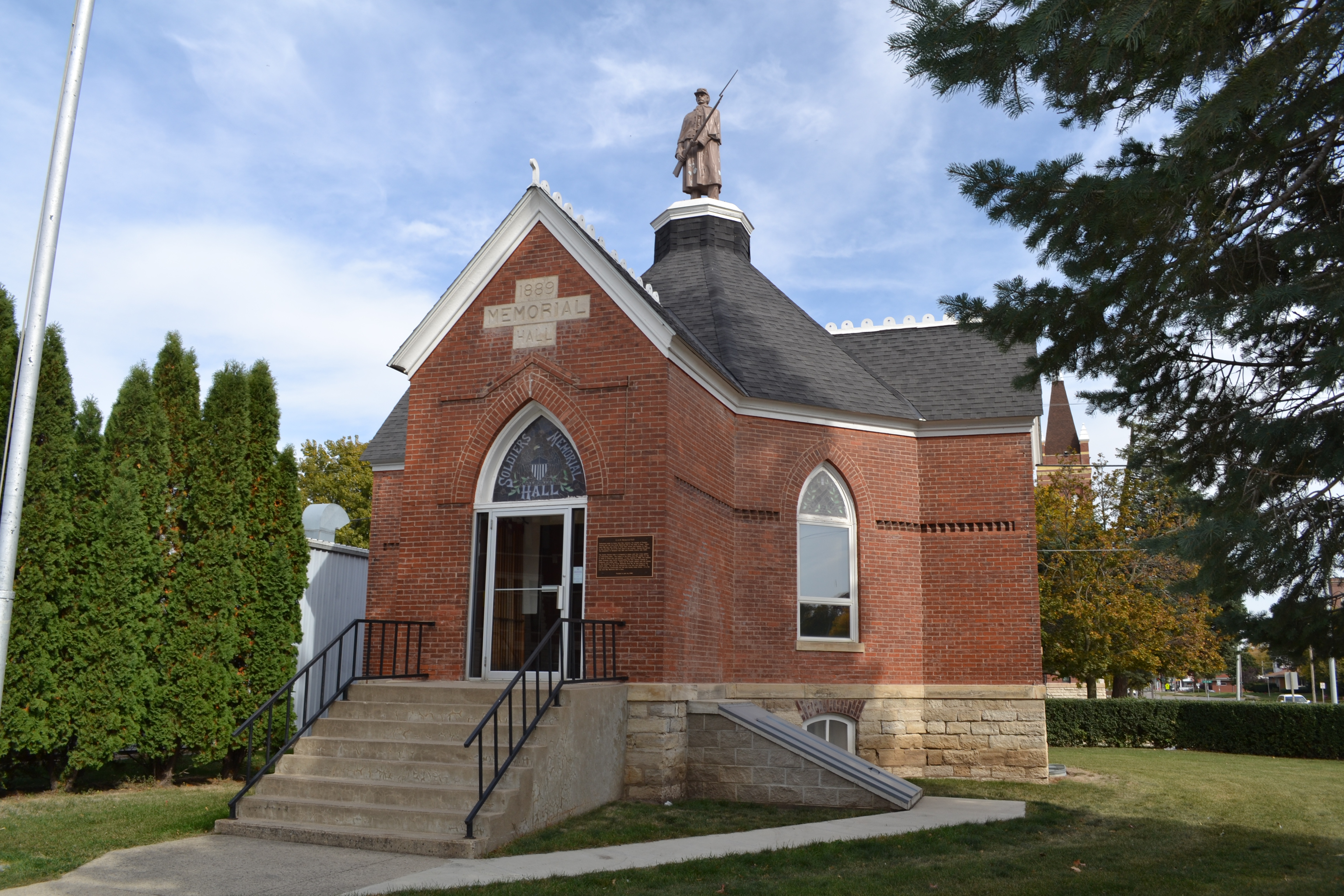

- Location within Iowa Location within the United States
- Location: 3 Federal St. N. Hampton, Iowa
- Coordinates: 42°44′31.3″N 93°12′25.4″W
- Area: less than one acre
- Built: 1890
- Architect: Edward Carl Keifer
- Architectural style: Octagon Mode
- Part of: Hampton Double Square Historic District (ID03000834)
- NRHP reference No.: 91001828
- Added to NRHP: December 13, 1991

The Franklin County G. A. R. Soldiers' Memorial Hall, also known simply as the Soldiers' Memorial Hall, is a historic building located in Hampton, Iowa, United States. The octagonal-style structure was designed and built in 1890 by Edward Carl Keifer. It was the meeting place of the J.W. McKenzie Post No. 81, Grand Army of the Republic (G.A.R.), which was one of 519 GAR posts in Iowa. The building is architecturally significant as it is one of the few examples of a Gothic Revival style structure of this type in the area. It is a memorial chapel that follows a cross-shaped plan capped by an octagonal cupola with a statue of a Union soldier on top. Its significance is also derived from it being the first G.A.R. Memorial Hall built in Iowa. The Iowa legislature had passed a law in 1884 that allowed counties to levy a tax to support building G.A.R. memorials. Captain Rufus S. Benson, a local state representative, had the law amended in 1886 so that it allowed for the construction of a memorial hall, as the local G.A.R. chapter wanted it to be a place where they could meet.

The hall was individually listed on the National Register of Historic Places in 1991. In 2003 it was included as a contributing property in the Hampton Double Square Historic District.

== See also ==
- Grand Army of the Republic
- Grand Army of the Republic Hall (disambiguation)
- Sons of Union Veterans of the Civil War
