= Arthur E. Rankin =

American teacher and politician (1888–1962)

Member of the Iowa House of Representatives from the 74th district
- In office January 13, 1947 – January 7, 1951

Personal details
- Born: July 24, 1888 Morgan Township, Franklin County, Iowa, U.S.
- Died: December 7, 1962 (aged 74) Mason City, Iowa, U.S.
- Party: Republican
- Spouse: Mabel Brinton (m. 1914)
- Children: 2
- Education: Drake University (BS); University of Iowa (MA)
- Occupation: Politician, educator

Military service
- Allegiance: United States
- Branch/service: United States Navy
- Battles/wars: World War II

Arthur E. Rankin (July 24, 1888 – December 7, 1962) was an American teacher and politician.

Born near Dows, Iowa, in Morgan Township, Franklin County, Iowa, Rankin graduated from Dows High School. He served in the United States Navy during World War I. Rankin received his bachelor's degree from Drake University in 1914 and his master's degree from the University of Iowa in 1931. Rankin taught in rural schools and was principal and superintendent of schools. From 1947 to 1951, Rankin served in the Iowa House of Representatives and was a Republican. From 1958 to 1962, Rankin served on the Hampton, Iowa City Council. He then served as mayor of Hampton until his death. Rankin died in a hospital in Mason City, Iowa, after a short illness.
