= Franklin County Courthouse (Iowa) =

- U.S. National Register of Historic Places
- U.S. Historic district – Contributing property
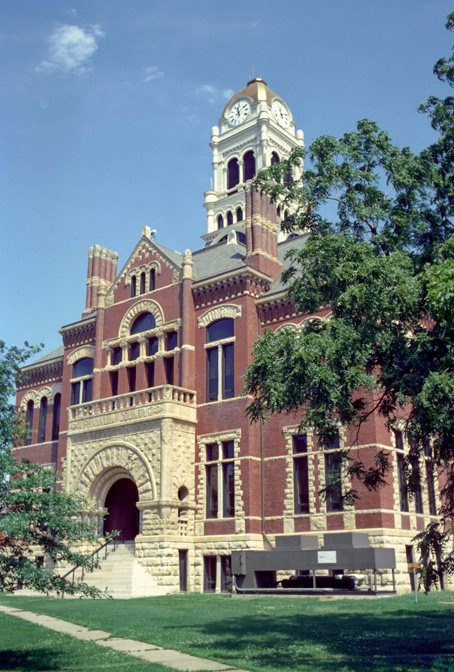
- Franklin County Courthouse in 1982

- Location within Iowa Location within the United States
- Interactive map showing the location for Franklin County Courthouse
- Location: Central Ave. and 1st St., NW., Hampton, Iowa
- Coordinates: 42°44′29″N 93°12′32″W
- Area: less than one acre
- Built: 1891
- Architect: T.D. Allen
- Architectural style: Romanesque
- Part of: Hampton Double Square Historic District (ID03000834)
- MPS: County Courthouses in Iowa TR (AD)
- NRHP reference No.: 76000772
- Added to NRHP: August 13, 1976

The Franklin County Courthouse in Hampton, Iowa, United States was built in 1891. It was individually listed on the National Register of Historic Places in 1976 as a part of the County Courthouses in Iowa Thematic Resource. In 2003 it was included as a contributing property in the Hampton Double Square Historic District. The courthouse is the third facility to house court functions and county administration.

== History ==
Initially, Franklin County business was enacted in the home of Judge James B. Reeve. County commissioners selected a small community called Jefferson as the county seat in deference to Judge Reeve who was from Jefferson, Ohio. However, a county commissioner opposed the proposal, and with the backing of county residents, Hampton was designated as the county seat. In 1857, commissioners built a single-story frame building to serve as the initial courthouse. Subsequently, they sold it to a church, which converted it into a residence. Eventually, it was repurposed as a stable. County records were kept at a school until a new courthouse built of stone was constructed in the middle of the square. It measured 48 by 70 feet (15 m × 21 m) and cost $12,500. The present Romanesque Revival building, by Minneapolis architect T.D. Allen, was completed in 1891 at a cost of $60,000. The courthouse is a fine example of the Romanesque Revival style popular in the late 19th century. It was built during a transitional period of county government that saw movement from simple utilitarian structures to more elaborate structures that reflected the need for more space and bestowed a sense of dignity to its work.

== Architecture ==
The courthouse is a two-story brick structure built over a raised basement. It is roughly rectangular in shape, and measures 102 by 76 feet (31 m × 23 m). The high foundation of the building and surround of the large round-arch main entrance is composed of rusticated stone. All of the windows feature stone ornamentation with rusticated stone surrounds on the first-floor windows. The building also features a machicolated cornice and clusters of circular chimneys. It is capped with a hipped roof and a tall domed clock tower. The tower itself has a four-faced clock and a statue of a classical figure at each corner of the bell chamber. A statue of Lady Justice is on top of the dome.
