= Beeds Lake State Park =

State park in Franklin County, Iowa

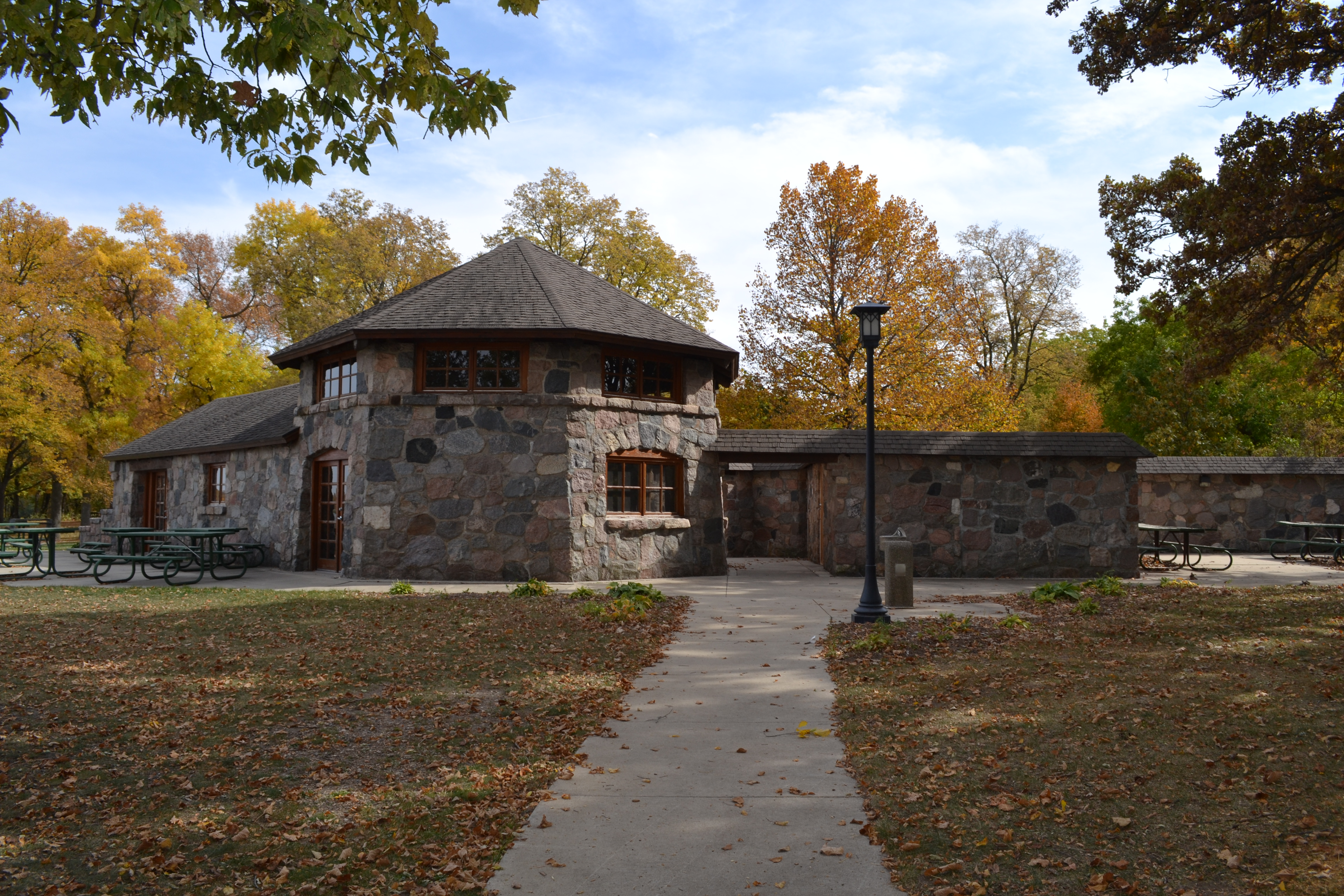
- The park's CCC-era bathouse

- Location within Iowa Location within the United States
- Location: Franklin County, Iowa, United States
- Nearest city: Hampton, Iowa
- Coordinates: 42°46′13″N 93°14′37″W
- Area: 319 acres (129 ha)
- Elevation: 1,135 ft (346 m)
- Established: 1934
- Administrator: Iowa Department of Natural Resources
- Website: Official website
- Beeds Lake State Park, Civilian Conservation Corps Area
- U.S. National Register of Historic Places
- U.S. Historic district
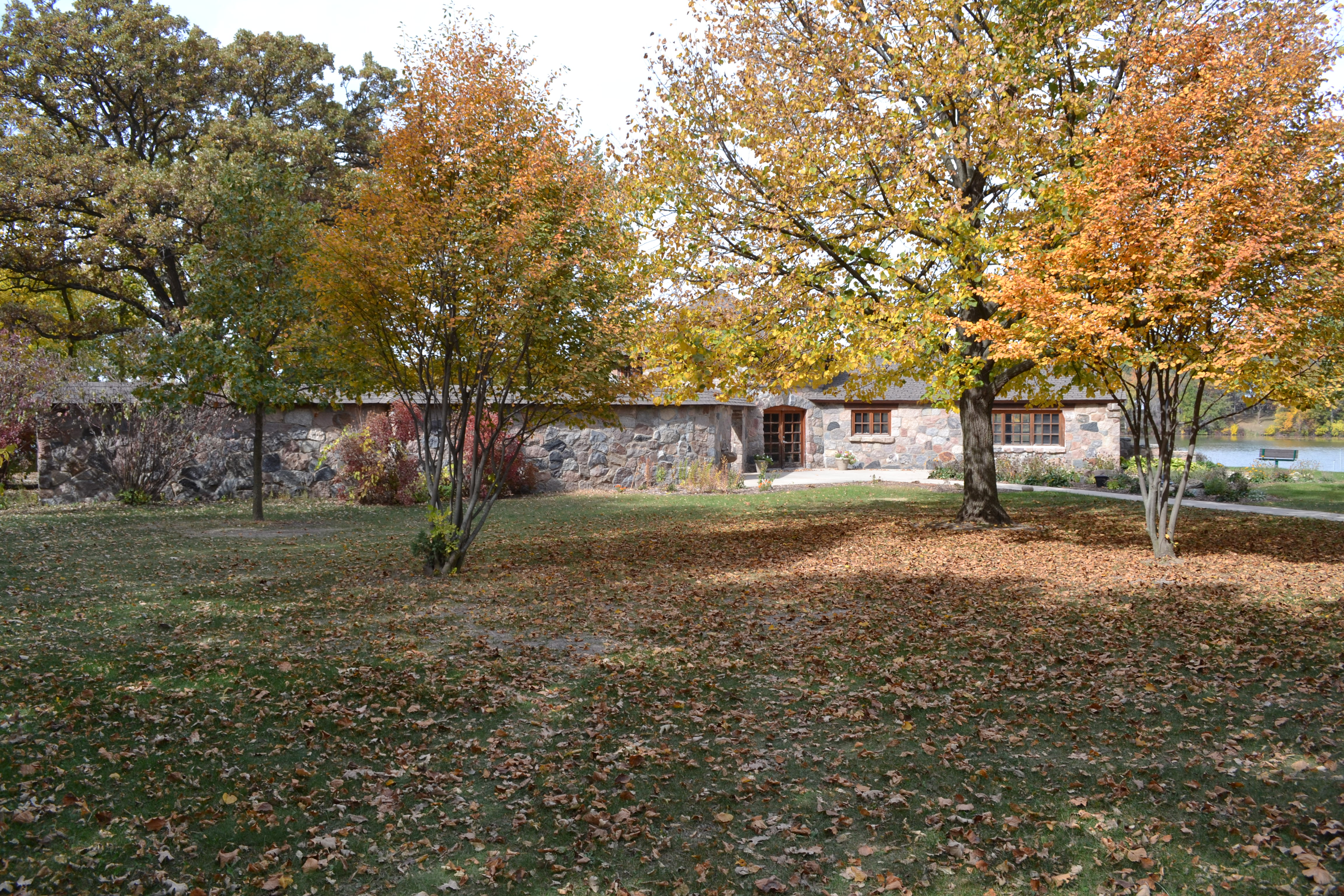
- Area: 79.89 acres (32.33 ha)
- Built: 1934-1938
- Architect: Central Design Office, Ames
- Architectural style: Rustic
- MPS: CCC Properties in Iowa State Parks MPS
- NRHP reference No.: 90001672
- Added to NRHP: November 15, 1990

Beeds Lake State Park is a public recreation area located northwest of Hampton, Iowa, United States. The 319-acre (129 ha) park surrounds a 99-acre (40 ha) reservoir. It features hiking trails, boating, fishing, swimming, camping, picnic areas and shelters, lodges and concessions. The park was listed as a historic district on the National Register of Historic Places as Beeds Lake State Park, Civilian Conservation Corps Area in 1990. At the time of its nomination, it contained 21 resources, which included one contributing building, 15 contributing structures, and five non-contributing structures.

== History ==
Springbrook Creek was dammed and a sawmill was built in 1857. A flour mill was established two years later. The property was bought by William Beed in 1864 and he continued the operation until 1903-1904. The dike washed-out between 1910 and 1913, and the mill was taken down in 1916. The following year the 40-acre (16 ha) mill pond was drained. The local Izaak Walton League desired to create a 120-acre (49 ha) lake as early as 1926. They were able to buy options for 254 acres (103 ha) in 1933. The City of Hampton and several civic organizations bought the property the following year and presented it to the State of Iowa. The city requested that the Civilian Conservation Corps (CCC) develop a 258.68-acre (104.68 ha) park.

The CCC worked from 1934 to 1938 developing the park. They set up camp in the Franklin County Fairgrounds. The dam and spillway were constructed between 1934 and 1936. They began filling the lake by August 1937. Five fish rearing ponds were created from 1936 to 1937 to the east of the lake on 15 acres (6.1 ha) bought by the State Board of Conservation in 1935. A causeway was created on top of the old dike. The bathhouse was built between 1935 and 1936, and a footbridge was built in 1937. The beach adjacent to the bathhouse was completed in October 1936. The boulders for the spillway and bathhouse construction came from adjacent fields. Other minor structures, which include a flagstone walk and roadways, are also considered historic and were built by the CCC. The park officially opened on June 5, 1938. The non-contributing structures were all built after the CCC's involvement.
