= Dickinson County Courthouse (Iowa) =

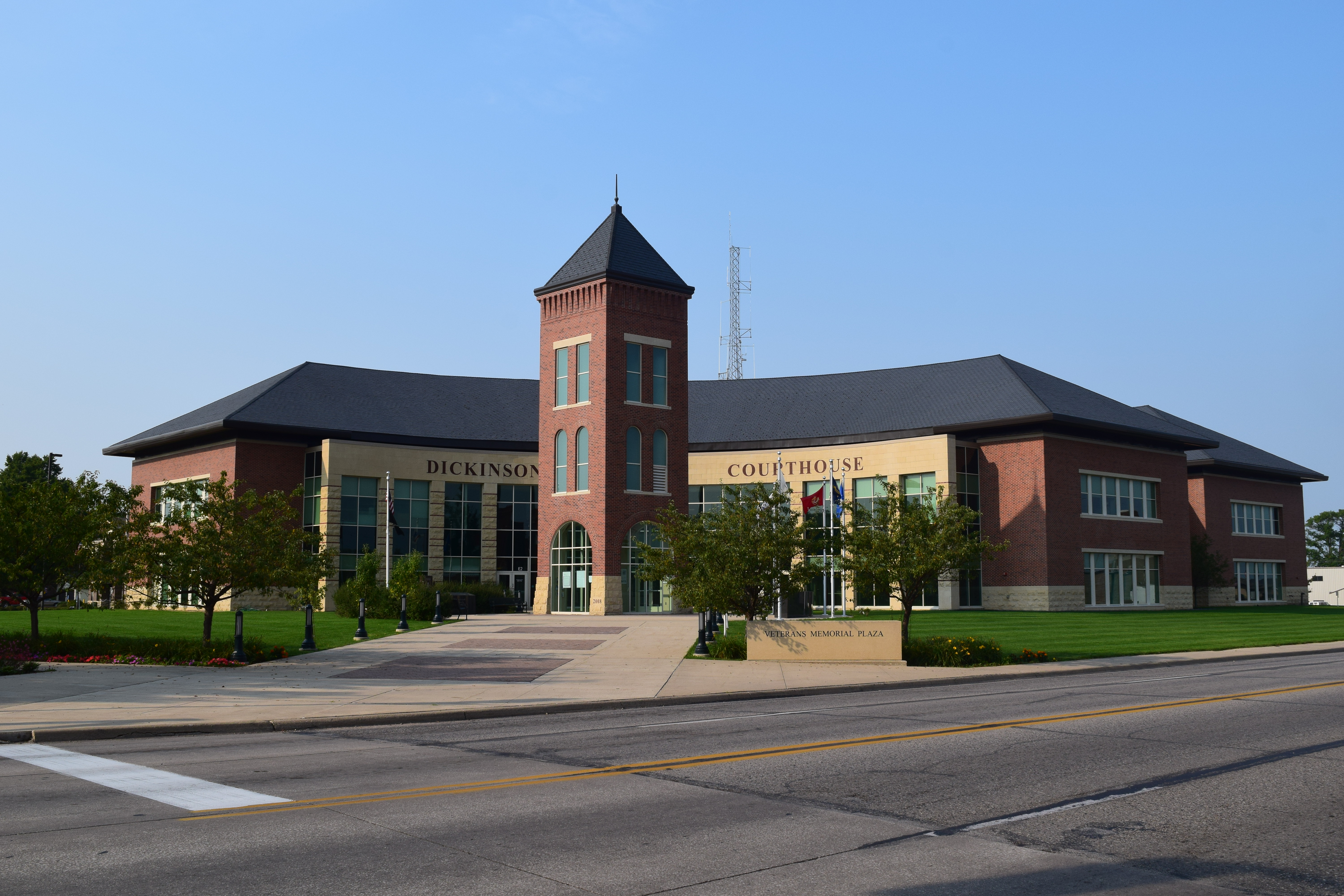
- The current courthouse
- Interactive map of the Dickinson County Courthouse area

General information
- Type: Courthouse
- Architectural style: Post-modern
- Location: 1802 Hill Ave., Spirit Lake, Iowa, United States
- Coordinates: 43.422086°N 95.103305°W
- Construction started: August 2004
- Inaugurated: June 2009
- Cost: $14.9 million

Technical details
- Floor count: Two

Design and construction
- Architecture firm: RDG Planning and Design
- Dickinson County Courthouse
- Formerly listed on the U.S. National Register of Historic Places
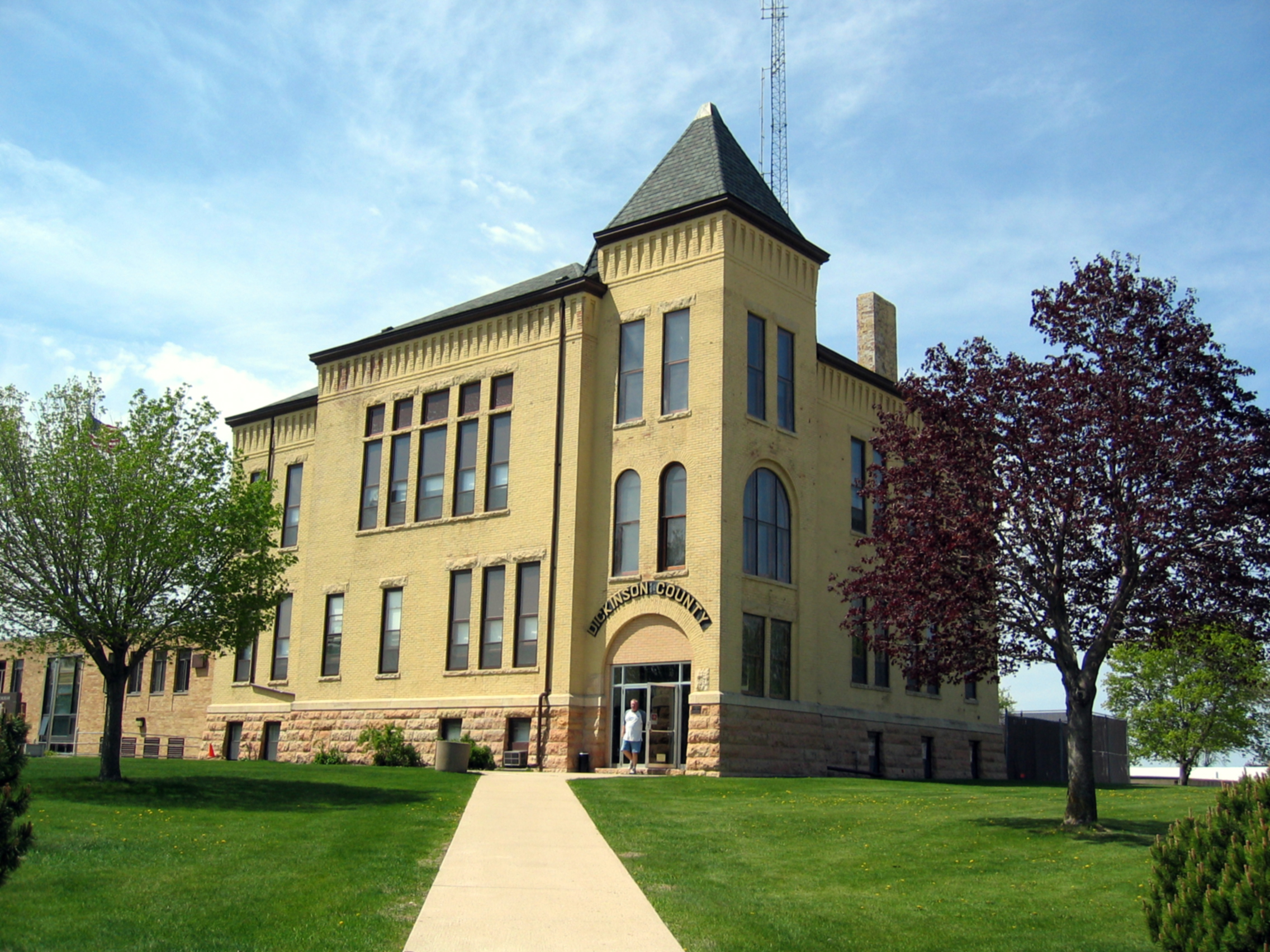
- The former Dickinson County Courthouse
- Coordinates: 43.422086°N 95.103305°W
- Built: 1891
- Architect: T. Dudley Allen
- Architectural style: Romanesque
- NRHP reference No.: 81000235

Significant dates
- Added to NRHP: July 2, 1981
- Removed from NRHP: September 13, 2006

The Dickinson County Courthouse is located in Spirit Lake, Iowa, United States. Built in two phases in 2006 and 2009, it is the fourth building to house court functions and county administration.

== History ==
Construction for Dickinson County's first courthouse was begun in 1859, but it wasn't finished until 1868. Native Americans attacked settlers along the Des Moines River in 1862. There were between 25 and 40 families who took up shelter in the unfinished building for protection. A company of Union Army soldiers from Sioux City, Iowa took up quarters in the building, and the settlers returned to their homes. The troops remained until 1865, and work was done to the building sporadically until the brick Greek Revival structure was completed in 1868. In addition to a courthouse, this building was used for a schoolhouse, revival meetings, dances, traveling shows, political meetings, and other civic functions. It and some of the county records were destroyed in a fire on November 24, 1871.

The second county courthouse was a brick structure that was built using some of the bricks from the original courthouse. The building was condemned in the late 1880s.

The third courthouse was begun in October 1890 and it opened in 1891 at a cost of almost $15,000. T. Dudley Allen designed the structure in a Romanesque Revival style featuring a square tower with a hip roof on one corner. Bricks from the first two courthouses were mixed in with the concrete that was used for the foundation. It was expanded in 1957, 1976, and 1978 to accommodate the growing county government. The third county courthouse was listed on the National Register of Historic Places (NRHP) in 1981. By the early 21st-century, the historic structure started to fail and the County Board of Supervisors determined it was not worth renovating. Voters authorized spending for the current facility in 2003 after three failed attempts. RDG Planning and Design of Des Moines was hired to design the new courthouse.

Construction on the present courthouse was begun in July 2004 by McHan Construction of Sioux City. Former U.S. Congressman Berkley Bedell gave the keynote address at the groundbreaking ceremony on August 12. The old courthouse remained in use during the first phase of construction until it was razed in 2005. It was removed from the NRHP the following year. Phase one construction, the western half of the building, was completed in March 2006 and the county jail, communications center and sheriff's department, assessor, recorder, treasurer, veterans affairs, clerk of courts, and community services moved into the new facility during an 8-inch (20 cm) snowstorm. The courtrooms and law library were also finished at this time. Phase II of the $14.9 million project was completed in January 2009, and the remaining county offices moved into the building. It was the first time in 50 years that all county offices were in the same building. The courthouse was the first new county courthouse built in Iowa in more than 30 years. It was dedicated in June 2009.

== Architecture ==
The 60,000-square-foot (5,600 m^{2}) facility is two stories, faced with red brick and limestone accents, and features large windows on its curved front façade. Adjacent is a tower at the same location of the tower of the former courthouse and visually similar. It rises 62 feet (19 m) and houses information on county history, attractions, and veterans named on the nearby memorial. Designed to last at least 100 years, the courthouse features three courtrooms, a state-of-the-art jail system and 911 communications center, a community/supervisors room that seats more than 100 people, decorative medallions on the terrazzo floor that depict county townships and lakes, and an eco-friendly parking lot that uses low impact development techniques to manage stormwater runoff.
