= Hampton, Iowa =

Town in Iowa, United States

- City
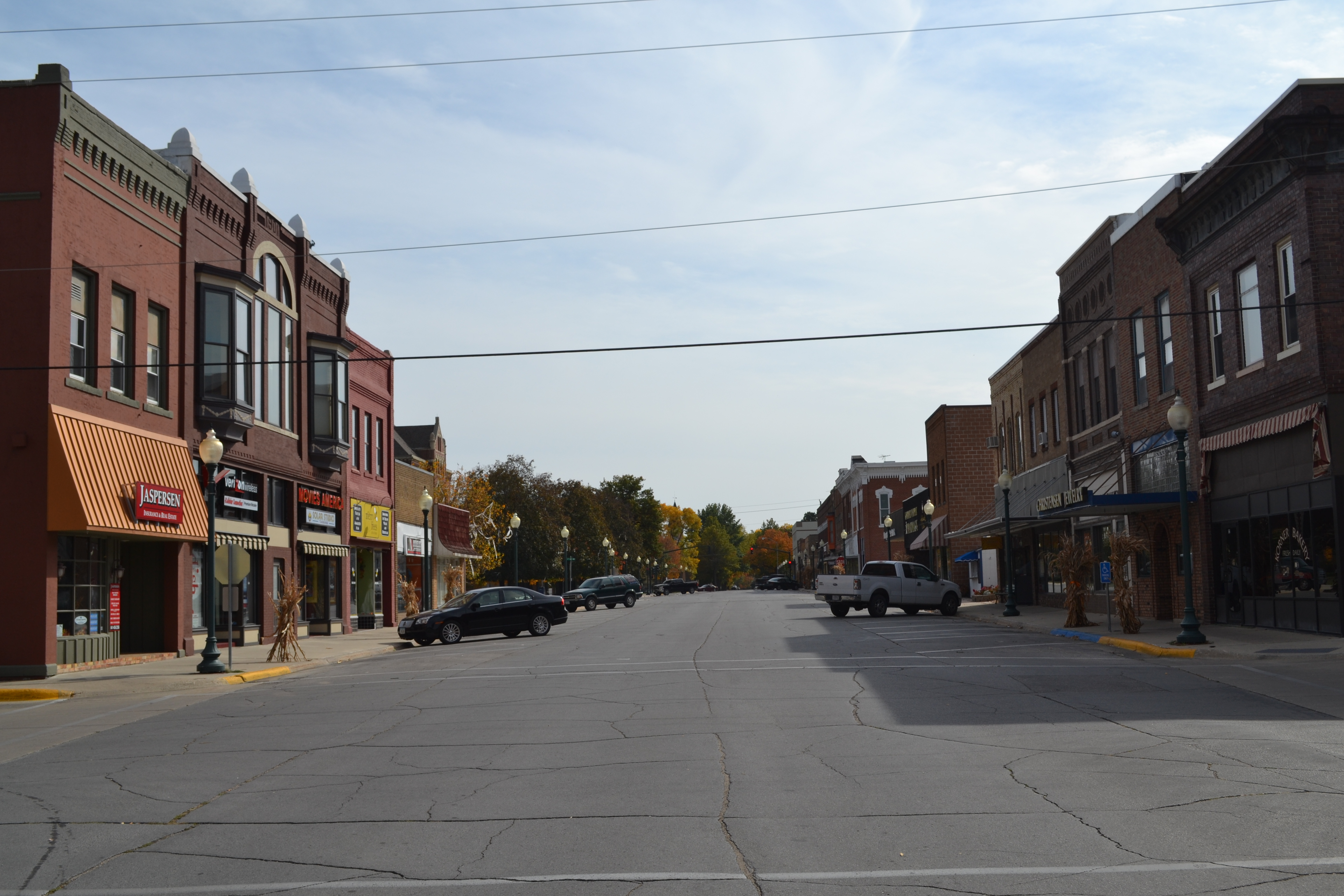
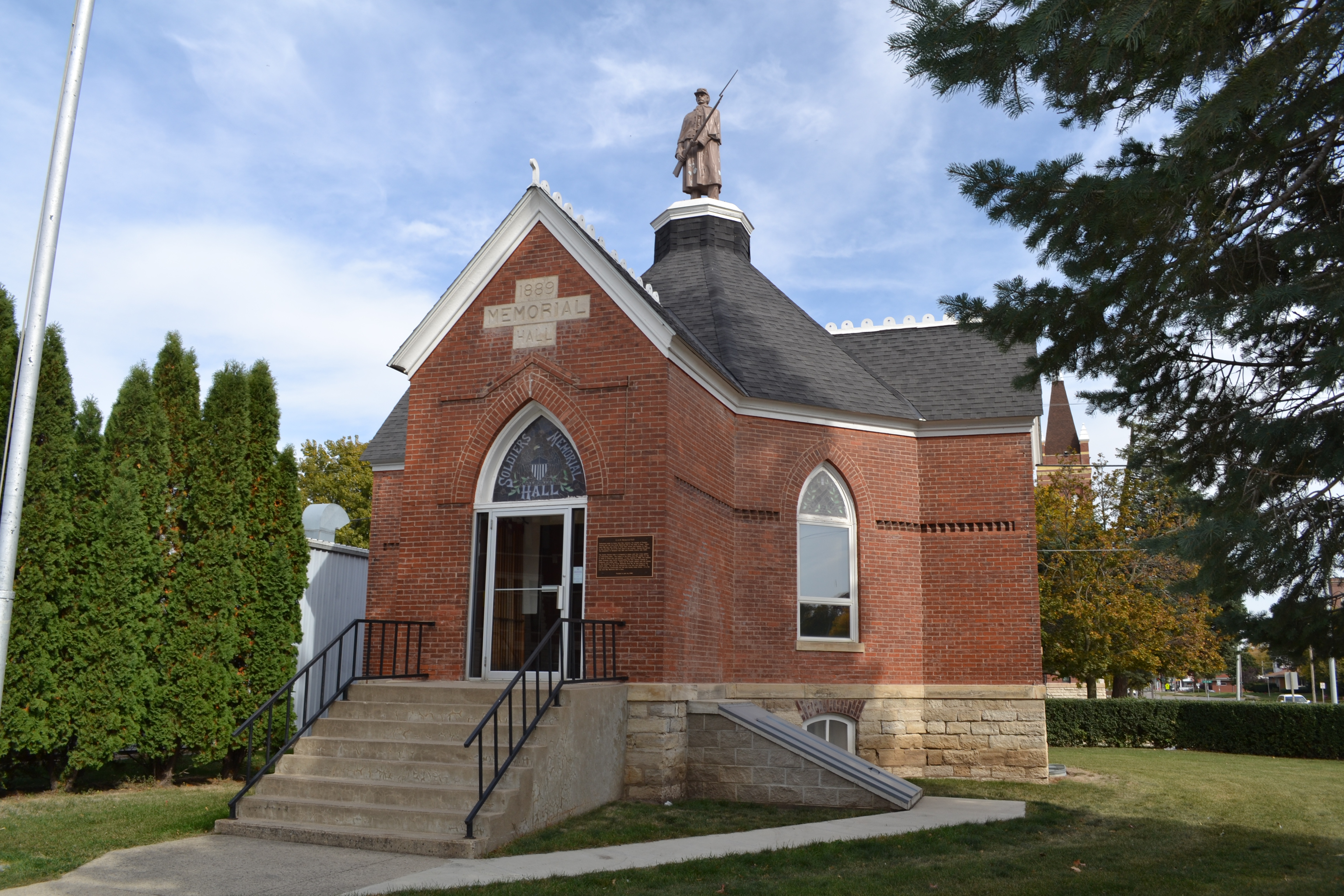
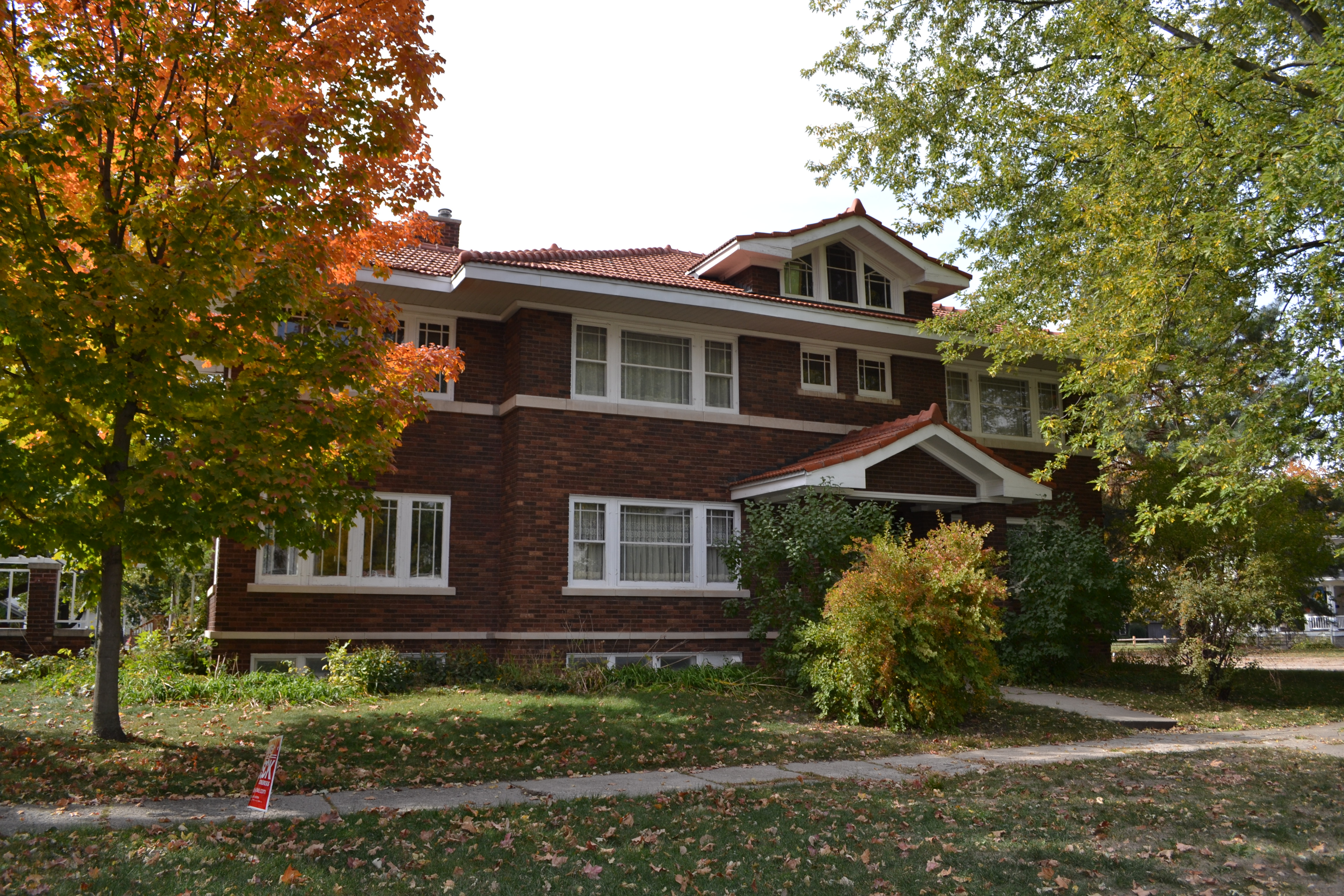
- Hampton Double Square Historic District G.A.R Soldiers' Memorial Hall H.E. Boehmler House
- Interactive map of Hampton, Iowa
- Coordinates: 42.741989°N 93.204992°W
- Country: United States
- State: Iowa
- County: Franklin
- Founded of as Benjamin: 1856
- Incorporated of as Hampton: 1870

Government
  - Type: Mayor–council
  - Mayor: Steve Birdsall
  - City Council: Kristin Roode; Barry Lamos; Bill Holmstrom; Jerre Grefe; Jim Davies; Patrick Palmer

Area
  - Total: 4.425 sq mi (11.460 km^{2})
  - Land: 4.425 sq mi (11.460 km^{2})
  - Water: 0 sq mi (0.000 km^{2}) 0.0%
- Elevation: 1,142 ft (348 m)

Population (2020)
  - Total: 4,337
  - Estimate (2024): 4,340
  - Density: 980.2/sq mi (378.4/km^{2})
- Time zone: UTC−6 (Central (CST))
  - Summer (DST): UTC−5 (CDT)
- ZIP Code: 50441
- Area code: 641
- FIPS code: 19-33960
- GNIS feature ID: 0467996
- Website: hamptonia.us

Hampton is a city in and the county seat of Franklin County, Iowa, United States. The population was 4,337 at the 2020 census, and was estimated at 4,340 in 2024. The city is located two miles southeast of Beeds Lake State Park.

== History ==
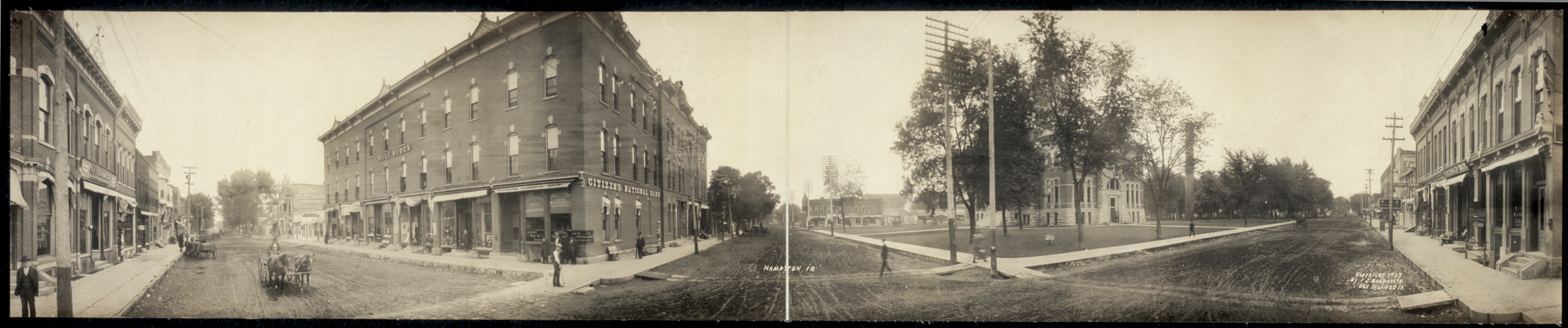
Hampton in 1907

Hampton was established in 1856 and named after Hampton, New Hampshire.

== Geography ==
According to the United States Census Bureau, the city has a total area of 4.425 square miles (11.46 km^{2}), all land.

=== Climate ===
According to the Köppen Climate Classification system, Hampton has a hot-summer humid continental climate, abbreviated "Dfa" on climate maps.

Climate data for Hampton, Iowa, 1991–2020 normals, extremes 1893–present
Month	Jan	Feb	Mar	Apr	May	Jun	Jul	Aug	Sep	Oct	Nov	Dec	Year
Record high °F (°C)	65 (18)	68 (20)	88 (31)	95 (35)	107 (42)	106 (41)	109 (43)	105 (41)	102 (39)	96 (36)	80 (27)	70 (21)	109 (43)
Mean maximum °F (°C)	46.3 (7.9)	50.3 (10.2)	69.1 (20.6)	80.9 (27.2)	88.2 (31.2)	92.5 (33.6)	93.3 (34.1)	91.2 (32.9)	89.5 (31.9)	83.2 (28.4)	67.3 (19.6)	50.9 (10.5)	95.1 (35.1)
Mean daily maximum °F (°C)	25.4 (−3.7)	30.2 (−1.0)	43.3 (6.3)	58.2 (14.6)	70.2 (21.2)	80.3 (26.8)	83.4 (28.6)	81.4 (27.4)	75.4 (24.1)	61.9 (16.6)	45.1 (7.3)	31.4 (−0.3)	57.2 (14.0)
Daily mean °F (°C)	16.7 (−8.5)	21.1 (−6.1)	33.4 (0.8)	46.5 (8.1)	58.9 (14.9)	69.3 (20.7)	72.7 (22.6)	70.3 (21.3)	62.8 (17.1)	49.9 (9.9)	35.2 (1.8)	22.9 (−5.1)	46.6 (8.1)
Mean daily minimum °F (°C)	7.9 (−13.4)	11.9 (−11.2)	23.6 (−4.7)	34.8 (1.6)	47.6 (8.7)	58.3 (14.6)	61.9 (16.6)	59.1 (15.1)	50.2 (10.1)	38.0 (3.3)	25.4 (−3.7)	14.5 (−9.7)	36.1 (2.3)
Mean minimum °F (°C)	−13.9 (−25.5)	−8.8 (−22.7)	1.6 (−16.9)	21.6 (−5.8)	34.0 (1.1)	45.9 (7.7)	51.5 (10.8)	49.1 (9.5)	35.7 (2.1)	23.3 (−4.8)	8.6 (−13.0)	−6.5 (−21.4)	−16.7 (−27.1)
Record low °F (°C)	−34 (−37)	−31 (−35)	−35 (−37)	9 (−13)	22 (−6)	35 (2)	40 (4)	36 (2)	22 (−6)	−1 (−18)	−14 (−26)	−23 (−31)	−35 (−37)
Average precipitation inches (mm)	0.97 (25)	1.31 (33)	2.09 (53)	4.26 (108)	5.25 (133)	6.06 (154)	4.70 (119)	4.24 (108)	3.30 (84)	2.54 (65)	1.80 (46)	1.59 (40)	38.11 (968)
Average snowfall inches (cm)	7.9 (20)	6.7 (17)	4.5 (11)	1.7 (4.3)	trace	0.0 (0.0)	0.0 (0.0)	0.0 (0.0)	0.0 (0.0)	0.2 (0.51)	2.9 (7.4)	8.1 (21)	32.0 (81)
Average precipitation days (≥ 0.01 in)	6.5	5.9	7.8	10.7	13.5	12.3	9.4	8.9	9.1	9.3	6.7	7.4	107.5
Average snowy days (≥ 0.1 in)	4.7	3.8	2.5	0.9	0.0	0.0	0.0	0.0	0.0	0.2	2.2	4.9	19.2
Source 1: NOAA (average snow/snow days 1981–2010)
Source 2: National Weather Service

== Demographics ==
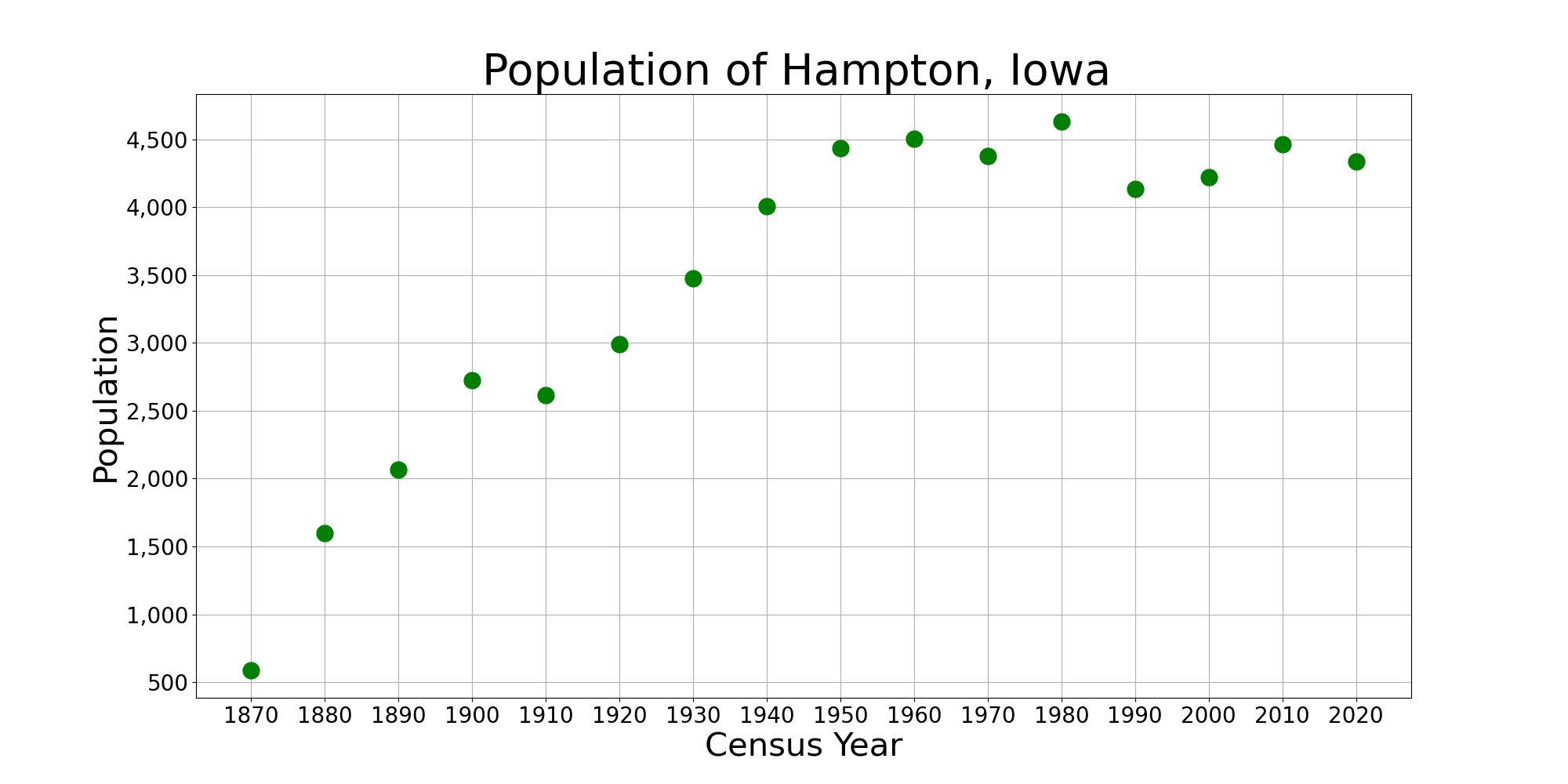
The population of Hampton, Iowa from the U.S. Census Data

Historical population
Census	Pop.	Note	%±
1870	588		—
1880	1,598		171.8%
1890	2,067		29.3%
1900	2,727		31.9%
1910	2,617		−4.0%
1920	2,992		14.3%
1930	3,473		16.1%
1940	4,006		15.3%
1950	4,432		10.6%
1960	4,501		1.6%
1970	4,376		−2.8%
1980	4,630		5.8%
1990	4,133		−10.7%
2000	4,218		2.1%
2010	4,461		5.8%
2020	4,337		−2.8%
2024 (est.)	4,340		0.1%
U.S. Decennial Census; 2020 Census

According to realtor website Zillow, the average price of a home as of October 31, 2025, in Hampton is $137,868.

=== Racial and ethnic composition ===
Hampton, Iowa – racial and ethnic composition Note: the US Census treats Hispanic/Latino as an ethnic category. This table excludes Latinos from the racial categories and assigns them to a separate category. Hispanics/Latinos may be of any race.
Race / ethnicity (NH = non-Hispanic)	Pop. 1990	Pop. 2000	Pop. 2010	Pop. 2020	% 1990	% 2000	% 2010	% 2020
White alone (NH)	4,007	3,720	3,432	2,936	96.95%	88.19%	76.93%	67.70%
Black or African American alone (NH)	3	6	12	22	0.07%	0.14%	0.27%	0.51%
Native American or Alaska Native alone (NH)	1	2	4	10	0.02%	0.05%	0.09%	0.23%
Asian alone (NH)	7	8	14	28	0.17%	0.19%	0.31%	0.65%
Pacific Islander alone (NH)	—	0	0	0	—	0.00%	0.00%	0.00%
Other race alone (NH)	1	0	1	8	0.02%	0.00%	0.02%	0.18%
Mixed race or multiracial (NH)	—	19	40	84	—	0.45%	0.90%	1.94%
Hispanic or Latino (any race)	114	463	958	1,249	2.76%	10.98%	21.48%	28.80%
Total	4,133	4,218	4,461	4,337	100.00%	100.00%	100.00%	100.00%

=== 2020 census ===
As of the 2020 census, there were 4,337 people, 1,755 households, and 1,067 families residing in the city. The population density was 980.11 inhabitants per square mile (378.4/km^{2}). There were 1,937 housing units at an average density of 437.74 per square mile (169.0/km^{2}).

There were 1,755 households, 29.2% of which had children under the age of 18 living with them. 44.6% were married-couple households, 19.9% were households with a male householder and no spouse or partner present, and 28.9% were households with a female householder and no spouse or partner present. 39.2% of all households were non-families, 32.8% were made up of individuals, and 16.1% had someone living alone who was 65 years of age or older.

The median age in the city was 39.7 years. 25.6% of residents were under the age of 18 and 21.7% were 65 years of age or older. 28.2% of residents were under the age of 20; 4.7% were between the ages of 20 and 24; 23.0% were from 25 to 44; and 22.3% were from 45 to 64. For every 100 females there were 96.2 males, and for every 100 females age 18 and over there were 90.8 males age 18 and over. The gender makeup of the city was 49.0% male and 51.0% female.

0.0% of residents lived in urban areas, while 100.0% lived in rural areas. There were 1,937 housing units, of which 9.4% were vacant. The homeowner vacancy rate was 3.8% and the rental vacancy rate was 7.8%.

=== Demographic estimates ===
As of the 2023 American Community Survey, Hampton has an average of 2.43 persons per household. The city has a median household income of $48,922. Approximately 20.9% of the city's population lives at or below the poverty line. Hampton has an estimated 54.9% employment rate, with 14.5% of the population holding a bachelor's degree or higher and 89.9% holding a high school diploma.

The top five reported languages (people were allowed to report up to two languages, thus the figures will generally add to more than 100%) were English (76.2%), Spanish (21.1%), Indo-European (2.4%), Asian and Pacific Islander (0.4%), and Other (0.0%).

The median age in the city was 43.3 years.

=== 2010 census ===
As of the 2010 census, there were 4,461 people, 1,752 households, and 1,125 families residing in the city. The population density was 1,008.14 inhabitants per square mile (389.2/km^{2}). There were 1,971 housing units at an average density of 445.42 per square mile (172.0/km^{2}). The racial makeup of the city was 89.06% White, 0.56% African American, 0.20% Native American, 0.31% Asian, 0.07% Pacific Islander, 7.17% from some other races and 2.62% from two or more races. Hispanic or Latino people of any race were 21.48% of the population.

There were 1,752 households 31.7% had children under the age of 18 living with them, 48.6% were married couples living together, 10.2% had a female householder with no husband present, 5.5% had a male householder with no wife present, and 35.8% were non-families. 30.7% of households were one person and 15.4% were one person aged 65 or older. The average household size was 2.46 and the average family size was 3.05.

The median age was 38.9 years. 26% of residents were under the age of 18; 7.4% were between the ages of 18 and 24; 23.7% were from 25 to 44; 23.9% were from 45 to 64; and 19% were 65 or older. The gender makeup of the city was 49.4% male and 50.6% female.

=== 2000 census ===
As of the 2000 census, there were 4,218 people, 1,766 households, and 1,110 families residing in the city. The population density was 986.4 inhabitants per square mile (380.9/km^{2}). There were 1,928 housing units at an average density of 450.9 per square mile (174.1/km^{2}). The racial makeup of the city was 90.90% White, 0.14% African American, 0.26% Native American, 0.19% Asian, 0.00% Pacific Islander, 7.68% from some other races and 0.83% from two or more races. Hispanic or Latino people of any race were 10.98% of the population.

There were 1,766 households 28.0% had children under the age of 18 living with them, 50.8% were married couples living together, 8.4% had a female householder with no husband present, and 37.1% were non-families. 32.4% of households were one person and 18.6% were one person aged 65 or older. The average household size was 2.30 and the average family size was 2.89.

Age spread: 23.2% under the age of 18, 8.3% from 18 to 24, 24.3% from 25 to 44, 22.1% from 45 to 64, and 22.1% 65 or older. The median age was 41 years. For every 100 females, there were 90.7 males. For every 100 females age 18 and over, there were 88.1 males.

The median household income was $33,005 and the median family income was $45,391. Males had a median income of $29,706 versus $20,909 for females. The per capita income for the city was $19,907. About 7.0% of families and 9.4% of the population were below the poverty line, including 12.6% of those under age 18 and 8.2% of those age 65 or over.

== Economy ==
In 2007, the 200 MW Buffalo Creek Wind Farm was developed by Wind Capital Group and later sold to Alliant Energy later the same year. Hampton was at one time home of Winnebago Industries Fiberglass division until the plant was moved to Forest City in 2008.

== Education ==
Hampton–Dumont Community School District operates the area public schools. It was established on July 1, 1995, by the merger of the Dumont and Hampton school districts.

== Arts and culture ==
The Franklin Country Fair is held in Hampton. In past years the star attractions have been Marty Robbins, Marty Stuart, Luke Bryan, Trace Adkins, Rascal Flatts, David Nail, The Marshall Tucker Band and Lonestar. At the 2011 fair the acts were Lincoln Brewster, Kellie Pickler, and Charlie Daniels Band.

== Franklin County Soldiers Memorial Hall ==
The city has an unusual octagonal building constructed in 1890 to commemorate the local soldiers who fought in the American Civil War. It can be toured by appointment.

== Parks and recreation ==
Beeds Lake State Park is located a few miles northwest of the city.

== Transportation ==
The city is intersected by two major highways: U.S. Route 65 and Iowa Highway 3. Interstate 35 is nine miles west of town. There is also an airport, Hampton Municipal, located on the city's southwest side.

== Notable people ==
- Jack Bailey (1907–1980), actor, host of the game show Queen for a Day
- Raef LaFrentz (born 1976), former NBA player for the Portland Trail Blazers.
- George Lambert, Olympic medalist
- Tom Latham (born 1948), U.S. Representative for Iowa's 4th congressional district
- William D. Leahy (1875–1959), Fleet Admiral, Chief of Staff to President Roosevelt during World War II
- Arthur E. Rankin (1888–1962), Iowa educator and politician
- Thomas J. B. Robinson (1868–1958), U.S. Representative from Iowa
- Kent Slater (born 1945), Illinois state legislator and judge

== See also ==
- All-American Red Heads
