= Cobblestone House =

Cobblestone House or Cobblestone Farmhouse can refer to:

- Cobblestone House (Eau Claire, Wisconsin)
- Cobblestone House (Bath, New York)
- Cobblestone House (Cazenovia, New York)
- Cobblestone Farmhouse at 1229 Birdsey Road, Junius, New York
- Cobblestone Farmhouse at 1027 Stone Church Road, Junius, New York
- Cobblestone Farmhouse at 1111 Stone Church Road, Junius, New York

== See also ==
- List of cobblestone buildings
- John Graves Cobblestone Farmhouse, Junius, New York
- Cobblestone Historic District, Childs, New York
- Cobblestone architecture
- Stone House (disambiguation)
