= Stone House =

Stone House — or Stonehouse — may refer to:

== Communities ==
=== Canada ===
- Stonehouse, Nova Scotia

=== United Kingdom ===
- Stone House, Cumbria, England
- Stonehouse, Gloucestershire, a town now in Stroud District, England
- Stonehouse, Plymouth, a former town in England
- Stonehouse, South Lanarkshire, Scotland

=== United States ===
- Stone House, Nevada, an unincorporated community
- Stone House, West Virginia

== Buildings ==
=== Australia ===
- Stonehouse, Moore, Queensland, Australia

=== China ===
- Stone House (Diamond Hill), the last structure remaining from the former Tai Hom squatter village in Hong Kong

=== India ===
- Stone House, Ooty

=== United Kingdom ===
- Stone House, Deptford, London
- Stone House, Hawes, North Yorkshire

=== United States ===
- Stone House (Fayetteville, Arkansas)
- Stone House (Arcata, California), on the National Register of Historic Places listings in Humboldt County, California
- Stone House of John Marsh, in Contra Costa County, California
- Stone House (Lake County, California)
- Stone House (Sun Valley, California), on the List of Los Angeles Historic-Cultural Monuments in the San Fernando Valley
- Tuttle Creek Ashram, also known as The Stone House
- Stone House (Lakewood, Colorado), on the National Register of Historic Places listings in Jefferson County, Colorado
- Stone House (Le Claire, Iowa)
- Stone House (Portland, Oregon)
- Stone House (Bridgton, Maine)
- Stone House (Taunton, Massachusetts)
- Stone Houses (St. Louis, Missouri), on the National Register of Historic Places listings in St. Louis, Missouri
- Stone House by the Stone House Brook the "Old Stone House", South Orange, New Jersey, on National Register of Historic Places in Essex County, New Jersey
- Ralph Hardesty Stone House the "Old Stone House", on the National Register of Historic Places listings in Muskingum County, Ohio
- Stone House (New Berlin, Ohio), on the National Register of Historic Places listings in Erie County, Ohio
- Clemuel Ricketts Mansion in Sullivan County, Pennsylvania
- Stone House (Lexington, Virginia)
- Sloan–Parker House, near Junction, West Virginia

=== Yemen ===
- Dar al-Hajar, a palace near Sana‘a

== Other uses ==
- Stonehouse (Bristol Road) railway station, disused; in Stonehouse, Gloucestershire, England
- Stonehouse (surname), several people
- Stonehouse Signs, American manufacturer of safety signs
- Stonehouse railway station, in Stonehouse, Gloucestershire, England
- Stonehouse (TV series), 2023 docudrama about British politician John Stonehouse
- Stone House, a 2001 album by George Lynch
- Shiwu or Stonehouse (1272–1352), Chinese Chan poet and hermit

== See also ==
- Bluestone
- Brownstone
- Greystone (architecture)
- Old Stone House (disambiguation)
- Cobblestone House (disambiguation)
- Dry stone hut
- Stonhouse (disambiguation)
- Stone (disambiguation)
- House (disambiguation)
