= Iowa River Railroad =

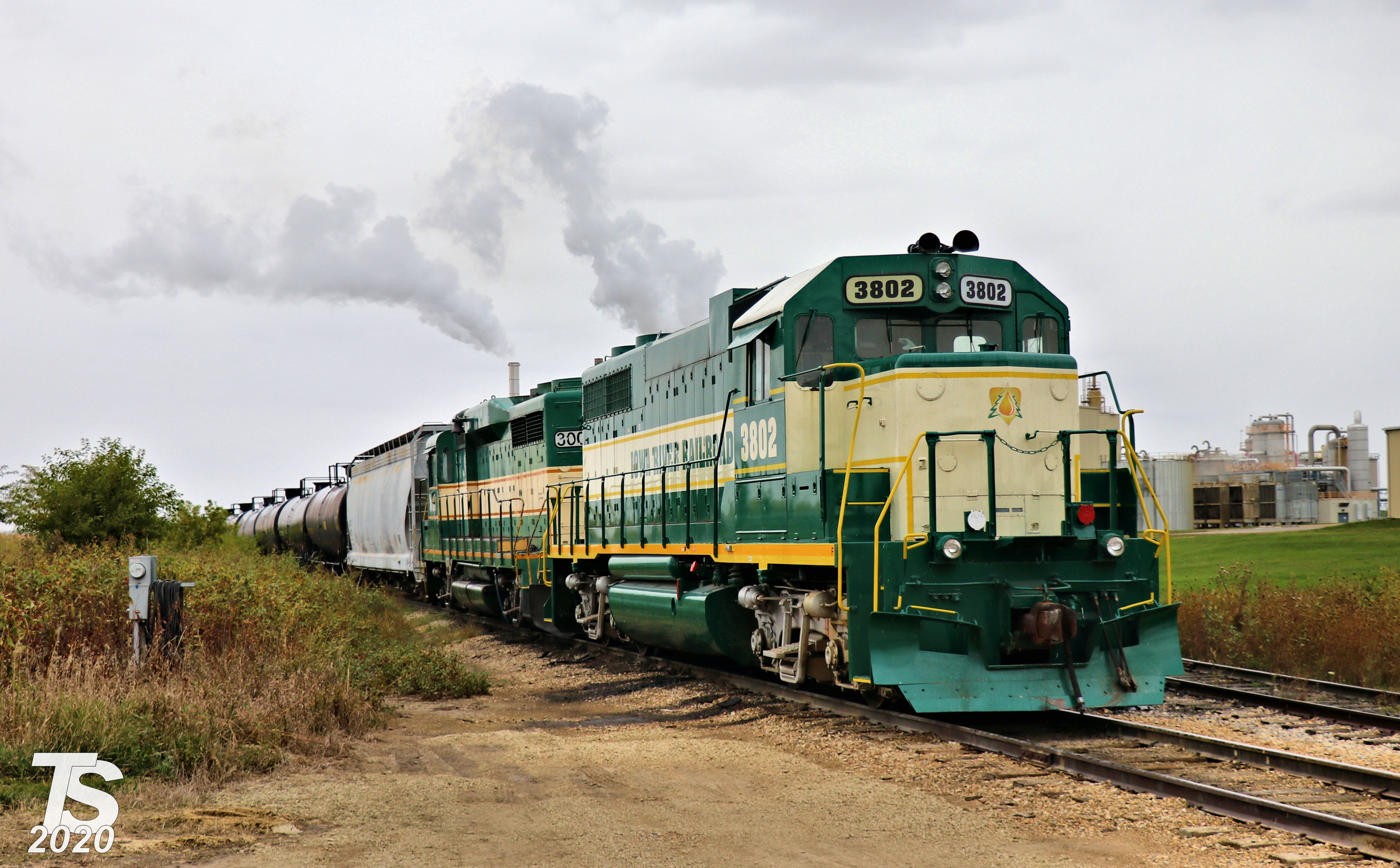
- IARR 3802 in Cleves, Iowa, 30 October 2020

Overview
- Headquarters: Marshalltown, IA
- Reporting mark: IARR
- Locale: Iowa
- Dates of operation: 2006–present

Technical
- Track gauge: 4 ft 8 1/2 in (1,435 mm) standard gauge

The Iowa River Railroad (reporting mark IARR) operates freight service from Ackley, Iowa to end of track 1.4 miles south of U.S. Highway 20, north of Steamboat Rock, Iowa, for a distance of about 9 miles. With its office located in Steamboat Rock, Iowa, IARR carries corn byproducts and ethanol from Pine Lake Corn Processors to the interchange with the Canadian National Railroad in Ackley, Iowa.

== History ==
In June 2006, the IARR purchased from the UP and started operations of the Marshalltown Industrial Lead from Marshalltown, Iowa to Steamboat Rock, Iowa. In June 2006, the IARR also purchased from North Central Railway Association a rail line running between Steamboat Rock and Ackley, Iowa, which needed rehabilitation prior to operating over. Rehabilitation has been completed and that portion of the line is currently in use.

In 2012, the Iowa River Railroad filed to abandonment of line running from Steamboat Rock to Marshalltown with the Surface Transportation Board.

The same year, a request for imposition of a public use condition and issuance of an interim trail use for the line was filed on behalf of the conservation boards of both Marshall and Hardin Counties, as well as the cities of Marshalltown, Union, Steamboat Rock, Liscomb, Eldora and Albion and the Iowa Natural Heritage Foundation. The action was approved by the Surface Transportation Board.

The abandoned line will be turned into the Iowa River Rail Trail.

== Connection ==
The IARR connects with the Canadian National (formerly Illinois Central) at Ackley. Before abandonment the line also connected with the Union Pacific Railroad at Marshalltown.

== Motive power ==
Current motive power consists of GP38-2 #4206, and GP38M #3802. GP30 #3004 is also still on property but stored.
