= Old Stone House =

Old Stone House may refer to:

- Old Stone House (Hampton, Iowa)
- Stone House by the Stone House Brook (South Orange, New Jersey)
- Old Stone House (Brooklyn), New York
- Old Stone House (Granite Quarry, North Carolina)
- Old Stone House (Vale, Oregon)
- Old Stone House (Winnsboro, South Carolina)
- Old Stone House (Winooski, Vermont)
- Old Stone House Museum, in Brownington Village, Vermont
- Old Stone House (Richmond, Virginia)/Edgar Allan Poe Museum
- Old Stone House (Millboro Springs, Virginia)
- Old Stone House (Washington, D.C.)
- Old Stone House (Morgantown, West Virginia)
- Old Stone House (Pennsboro, West Virginia)
- Wallace Estill Sr. House, near Union, West Virginia

== See also ==
- Old Stone House (Hampton, Iowa), an 1853 NRHP-listed building
- Old Stone House Library, an 1825 NHRP-listed building in Fort Ann, New York
- Stone House (disambiguation)
