= Wellsburg, Iowa =

- City
- Location of Wellsburg, Iowa
- Coordinates: 42°26′02″N 92°55′36″W
- Country: USA
- State: Iowa
- County: Grundy

Area
  - Total: 1.10 sq mi (2.84 km^{2})
  - Land: 1.10 sq mi (2.84 km^{2})
  - Water: 0 sq mi (0.00 km^{2})
- Elevation: 1,096 ft (334 m)

Population (2020)
  - Total: 720
  - Density: 655.8/sq mi (253.22/km^{2})
- Time zone: UTC-6 (Central (CST))
  - Summer (DST): UTC-5 (CDT)
- ZIP code: 50680
- Area code: 641
- FIPS code: 19-83325
- GNIS feature ID: 2397250
- Website: wellsburgiowa.net

Wellsburg is a city in Grundy County, Iowa, United States. The population was 720 at the 2020 census, a slight increase from 716 in 2000. It is part of the Waterloo–Cedar Falls Metropolitan Statistical Area. The city is named for George Wells, an early settler in the region.

== Geography ==
Wellsburg is located at 42°26′1″N 92°55′41″W (42.433723, -92.928172).

According to the United States Census Bureau, the city has a total area of 1.09 square miles (2.82 km^{2}), all land.

== Demographics ==
Historical populations
Year	Pop.	±%
1900	203	—
1910	288	+41.9%
1920	482	+67.4%
1930	508	+5.4%
1940	616	+21.3%
1950	744	+20.8%
1960	827	+11.2%
1970	754	−8.8%
1980	761	+0.9%
1990	682	−10.4%
2000	716	+5.0%
2010	707	−1.3%
2020	720	+1.8%
Source:"U.S. Census website". United States Census Bureau. and Iowa Data Center; Source: U.S. Decennial Census

=== 2020 census ===
As of the census of 2020, there were 720 people, 321 households, and 208 families residing in the city. The population density was 655.8 inhabitants per square mile (253.2/km^{2}). There were 363 housing units at an average density of 330.6 per square mile (127.7/km^{2}). The racial makeup of the city was 96.1% White, 0.0% Black or African American, 0.0% Native American, 0.1% Asian, 0.0% Pacific Islander, 0.3% from other races and 3.5% from two or more races. Hispanic or Latino persons of any race comprised 1.0% of the population.

Of the 321 households, 26.5% of which had children under the age of 18 living with them, 52.3% were married couples living together, 2.8% were cohabitating couples, 25.5% had a female householder with no spouse or partner present and 19.3% had a male householder with no spouse or partner present. 35.2% of all households were non-families. 31.8% of all households were made up of individuals, 17.8% had someone living alone who was 65 years old or older.

The median age in the city was 43.5 years. 24.2% of the residents were under the age of 20; 3.3% were between the ages of 20 and 24; 23.6% were from 25 and 44; 25.1% were from 45 and 64; and 23.8% were 65 years of age or older. The gender makeup of the city was 49.7% male and 50.3% female.

=== 2010 census ===
As of the census of 2010, there were 707 people, 333 households, and 201 families residing in the city. The population density was 648.6 inhabitants per square mile (250.4/km^{2}). There were 367 housing units at an average density of 336.7 per square mile (130.0/km^{2}). The racial makeup of the city was 98.4% White, 0.3% Asian, 0.6% from other races, and 0.7% from two or more races. Hispanic or Latino of any race were 2.1% of the population.

There were 333 households, of which 25.5% had children under the age of 18 living with them, 50.8% were married couples living together, 6.6% had a female householder with no husband present, 3.0% had a male householder with no wife present, and 39.6% were non-families. 34.2% of all households were made up of individuals, and 17.7% had someone living alone who was 65 years of age or older. The average household size was 2.12 and the average family size was 2.72.

The median age in the city was 45.3 years. 20.8% of residents were under the age of 18; 6.6% were between the ages of 18 and 24; 22.1% were from 25 to 44; 26.9% were from 45 to 64; and 23.6% were 65 years of age or older. The gender makeup of the city was 50.5% male and 49.5% female.

=== 2000 census ===
As of the census of 2000, there were 716 people, 338 households, and 201 families residing in the city. The population density was 725.6 inhabitants per square mile (280.2/km^{2}). There were 363 housing units at an average density of 367.8 per square mile (142.0/km^{2}). The racial makeup of the city was 98.88% White, 0.42% Asian, and 0.70% from two or more races.

There were 338 households, out of which 23.4% had children under the age of 18 living with them, 53.0% were married couples living together, 4.7% had a female householder with no husband present, and 40.5% were non-families. 37.9% of all households were made up of individuals, and 26.6% had someone living alone who was 65 years of age or older. The average household size was 2.12 and the average family size was 2.81.

In the city, the population was spread out, with 21.8% under the age of 18, 4.6% from 18 to 24, 22.3% from 25 to 44, 23.0% from 45 to 64, and 28.2% who were 65 years of age or older. The median age was 46 years. For every 100 females, there were 82.7 males. For every 100 females age 18 and over, there were 78.9 males.

The median income for a household in the city was $30,417, and the median income for a family was $38,750. Males had a median income of $30,724 versus $21,250 for females. The per capita income for the city was $17,636. About 4.5% of families and 6.0% of the population were below the poverty line, including 3.9% of those under age 18 and 8.6% of those age 65 or over.

== Education ==
AGWSR Community School District operates area public schools. The district formed on July 1, 2001, with the merger of the Wellsburg-Steamboat Rock Community School District and the Ackley–Geneva Community School District. The former was established on July 1, 1992, by the merger of the Steamboat Rock and Wellsburg school districts.
