= Steamboat Rock, Iowa =

- City
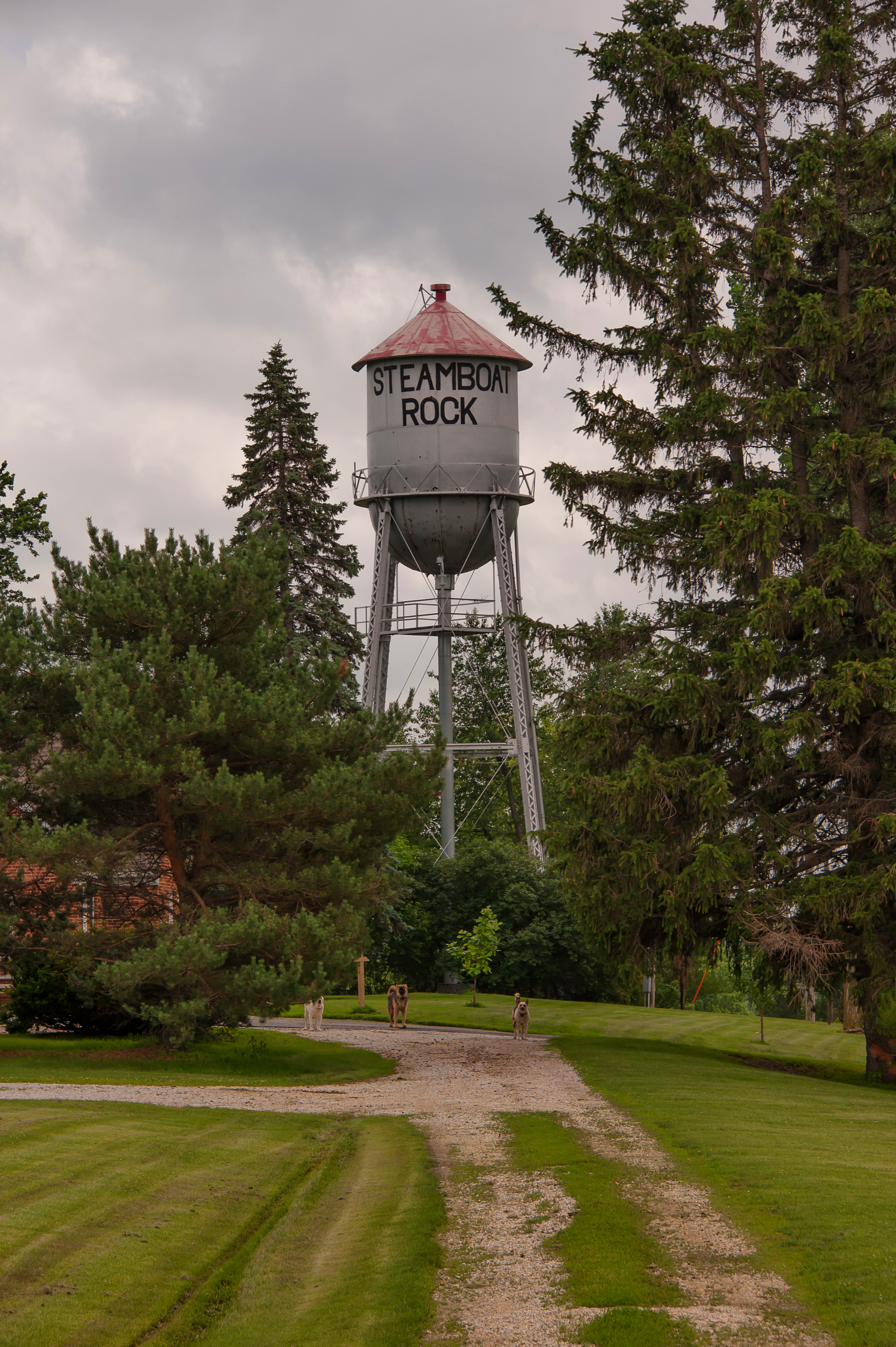
- Steamboat Rock water tower

- Location of Steamboat Rock, Iowa
- Coordinates: 42°24′29″N 93°03′58″W
- Country: US
- State: Iowa
- County: Hardin

Area
  - Total: 0.54 sq mi (1.40 km^{2})
  - Land: 0.54 sq mi (1.40 km^{2})
  - Water: 0 sq mi (0.00 km^{2})
- Elevation: 1,011 ft (308 m)

Population (2020)
  - Total: 264
  - Density: 488.5/sq mi (188.62/km^{2})
- Time zone: UTC-6 (Central (CST))
  - Summer (DST): UTC-5 (CDT)
- ZIP code: 50672
- Area code: 641
- FIPS code: 19-75180
- GNIS feature ID: 2395960
- Website: www.steamboatrockiowa.com

Steamboat Rock is a city in Hardin County, Iowa, United States. The population was 264 at the time of the 2020 census.

== History ==
Steamboat Rock was platted in 1855. It was named from a large rock on the river bluff which is said to resemble a queue of steamboats from a distance.

== Geography ==
According to the United States Census Bureau, the city has a total area of 0.55 square miles (1.42 km^{2}), all land.

Steamboat Rock is located on the Iowa River, at a point where the river marks the east edge of the Altmont Moraine, the glacial moraine that marks the east border of the Des Moines Lobe of the Wisconsin Glaciation. The river valley here is a deep gorge through the sandstone bedrock underlying the moraine. Unlike most of Iowa, where prairie dominated, this area was historically woodland.

=== Climate ===
Designated as having a humid continental climate, this region typically has a large seasonal temperature differences, with warm to hot (and often humid) summers and cold (sometimes severely cold) winters. Precipitation is relatively well distributed year-round in many areas with this climate. The Köppen Climate Classification subtype for this climate is "Dfa". (Hot Summer Continental Climate).

== Demographics ==
Historical populations
Year	Pop.	±%
1880	523	—
1890	367	−29.8%
1900	410	+11.7%
1910	378	−7.8%
1920	399	+5.6%
1930	377	−5.5%
1940	385	+2.1%
1950	395	+2.6%
1960	426	+7.8%
1970	394	−7.5%
1980	387	−1.8%
1990	335	−13.4%
2000	336	+0.3%
2010	310	−7.7%
2020	264	−14.8%
Source:"U.S. Census website". United States Census Bureau. and Iowa Data Center; Source: U.S. Decennial Census

=== 2020 census ===
As of the census of 2020, there were 264 people, 128 households, and 79 families residing in the city. The population density was 488.5 inhabitants per square mile (188.6/km^{2}). There were 156 housing units at an average density of 288.7 per square mile (111.5/km^{2}). The racial makeup of the city was 93.9% White, 0.0% Black or African American, 0.0% Native American, 0.8% Asian, 0.0% Pacific Islander, 0.0% from other races and 5.3% from two or more races. Hispanic or Latino persons of any race comprised 3.8% of the population.

Of the 128 households, 24.2% of which had children under the age of 18 living with them, 44.5% were married couples living together, 7.0% were cohabitating couples, 25.0% had a female householder with no spouse or partner present and 23.4% had a male householder with no spouse or partner present. 38.3% of all households were non-families. 35.2% of all households were made up of individuals, 18.8% had someone living alone who was 65 years old or older.

The median age in the city was 48.0 years. 22.0% of the residents were under the age of 20; 1.9% were between the ages of 20 and 24; 24.6% were from 25 and 44; 30.3% were from 45 and 64; and 21.2% were 65 years of age or older. The gender makeup of the city was 49.6% male and 50.4% female.

=== 2010 census ===
As of the census of 2010, there were 310 people, 146 households, and 81 families living in the city. The population density was 563.6 inhabitants per square mile (217.6/km^{2}). There were 164 housing units at an average density of 298.2 per square mile (115.1/km^{2}). The racial makeup of the city was 98.1% White, 0.6% Asian, 1.0% from other races, and 0.3% from two or more races. Hispanic or Latino of any race were 7.7% of the population.

There were 146 households, of which 23.3% had children under the age of 18 living with them, 47.9% were married couples living together, 3.4% had a female householder with no husband present, 4.1% had a male householder with no wife present, and 44.5% were non-families. 42.5% of all households were made up of individuals, and 21.3% had someone living alone who was 65 years of age or older. The average household size was 2.12 and the average family size was 2.89.

The median age in the city was 45.3 years. 19.7% of residents were under the age of 18; 6.9% were between the ages of 18 and 24; 23.2% were from 25 to 44; 30.3% were from 45 to 64; and 20% were 65 years of age or older. The gender makeup of the city was 50.0% male and 50.0% female.

=== 2000 census ===
As of the census of 2000, there were 336 people, 150 households, and 91 families living in the city. The population density was 617.6 inhabitants per square mile (238.5/km^{2}). There were 158 housing units at an average density of 290.4 per square mile (112.1/km^{2}). The racial makeup of the city was 93.45% White, 0.89% African American, 0.60% Asian, 4.17% from other races, and 0.89% from two or more races. Hispanic or Latino of any race were 6.25% of the population.

There were 150 households, out of which 25.3% had children under the age of 18 living with them, 54.0% were married couples living together, 5.3% had a female householder with no husband present, and 39.3% were non-families. 35.3% of all households were made up of individuals, and 22.0% had someone living alone who was 65 years of age or older. The average household size was 2.24 and the average family size was 2.93.

In the city, the population was spread out, with 25.0% under the age of 18, 6.3% from 18 to 24, 25.0% from 25 to 44, 22.6% from 45 to 64, and 21.1% who were 65 years of age or older. The median age was 40 years. For every 100 females, there were 92.0 males. For every 100 females age 18 and over, there were 92.4 males.

The median income for a household in the city was $28,125, and the median income for a family was $39,125. Males had a median income of $26,607 versus $25,156 for females. The per capita income for the city was $13,777. About 12.9% of families and 14.6% of the population were below the poverty line, including 17.6% of those under age 18 and 17.7% of those age 65 or over.

== Economy ==
Steamboat Rock is a major producer of corn (for ethanol fuel) and producer of ethanol, which is made from corn. The city was covered on a segment of the 60 Minutes television news program on May 7, 2006, in regard to its production of ethanol. The long dormant railroad line through the town was reactivated in 2007 with the establishment of the Iowa River Railroad - a rail line that primarily serves the ethanol industry.

== Education ==
AGWSR Community School District operates area public schools. The district formed on July 1, 2001, with the merger of the Wellsburg-Steamboat Rock Community School District and the Ackley–Geneva Community School District. The former was established on July 1, 1992, by the merger of the Steamboat Rock and Wellsburg school districts.
