= AGWSR Community School District =

Public school district in Ackley, Iowa, United States

Coordinates: 42.549381°N 93.049022°W

Location
- Ackley, Iowa Butler, Franklin, Grundy, and Hardin counties United States
- Coordinates: 42.549381, -93.049022

District information
- Type: Local school district
- Grades: K-12
- Established: 2001
- Superintendent: Ben Petty
- Schools: 5
- Budget: $11,400,000 (2020-21)
- NCES District ID: 1903060

Students and staff
- Students: 650 (2022–23)
- Teachers: 53.84 FTE
- Staff: 61.68 FTE
- Student–teacher ratio: 12.07
- Athletic conference: North Iowa Cedar League
- District mascot: Cougars
- Colors: Purple, Navy and Black

Other information
- Website: www.agwsr.org

Ackley Geneva Wellsburg Steamboat Rock (AGWSR) Community School District is a rural public school district headquartered in Ackley, Iowa.

It occupies sections of Butler, Franklin, Grundy, and Hardin counties. It serves Ackley, Geneva, Steamboat Rock, and Wellsburg.

The district formed on July 1, 2001, with the merger of the Wellsburg-Steamboat Rock Community School District and the Ackley–Geneva Community School District.

On January 23, 2026, the AGWSR School Board approved the move to the [Iowa Star Conference]. Iowa Star Conference

== Schools ==
- AGWSR High School (Ackley)
- AGWSR Elementary School at Wellsburg (Wellsburg)
- AGWSR Elementary School (Ackley)
- AGWSR Middle School (Wellsburg)
- The Cougars Den (Ackley)

=== AGWSR High School ===
==== Athletics ====
The Cougars compete in the North Iowa Cedar League Conference in the following sports:

- Bowling
- Cross Country (boys and girls)
- Volleyball (girls)
- Football (boys)
- Basketball (boys and girls)
  - Girls' 2009 Class 1A State Champions
- Wrestling (boys and girls)
- Track and Field (boys and girls)
- Golf (boys and girls)
  - Boys' 2021 Class 1A State Champions
- Baseball (boys)
- Softball (girls)
  - 2015 Class 1A State Champions
- Soccer (boys and girls)
- Tennis (boys and girls)

== See also ==
- List of school districts in Iowa
- List of high schools in Iowa
