= Leander Reeve House =

Historic house in Iowa, United States

- U.S. National Register of Historic Places
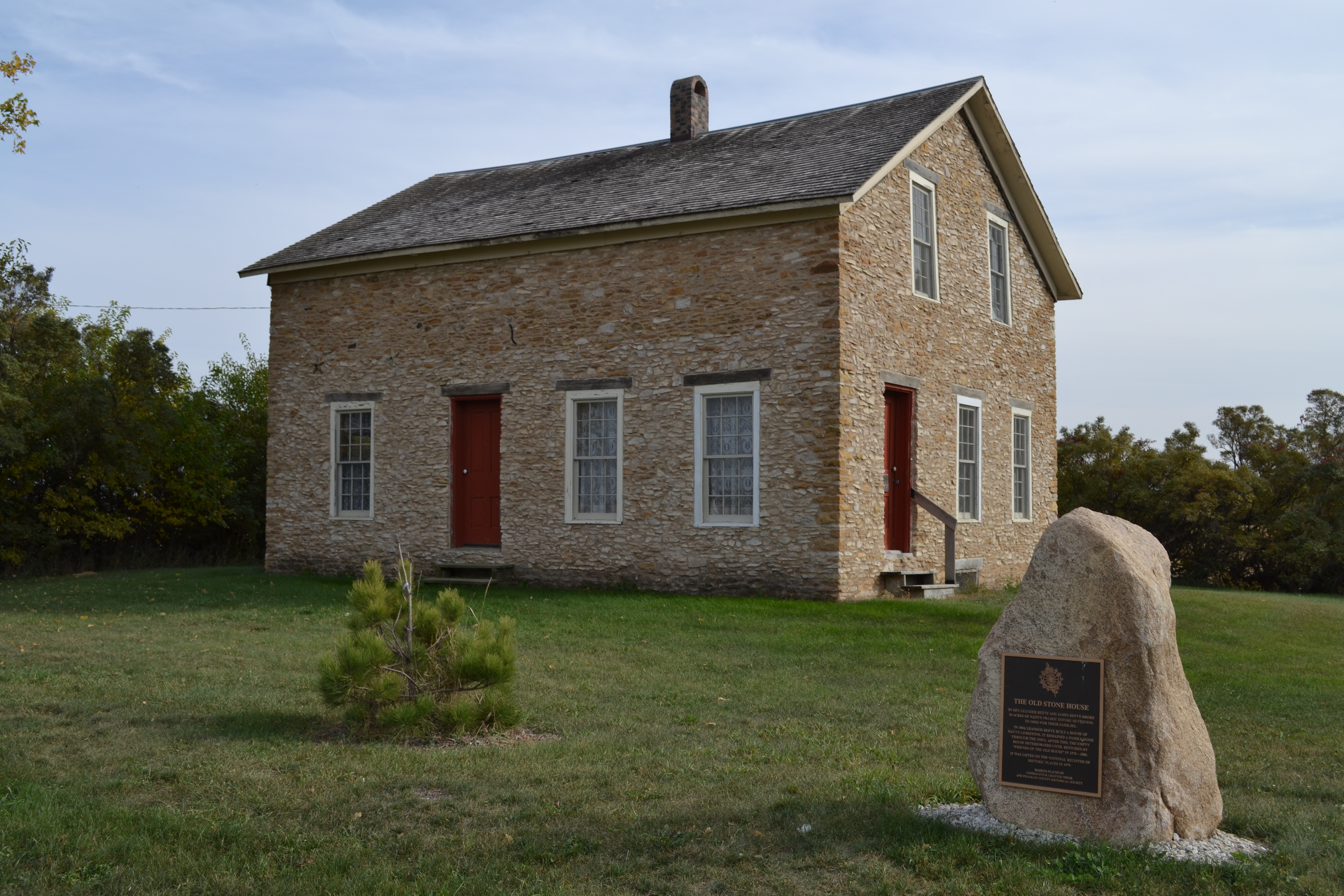

- Location within Iowa Location within the United States
- Interactive map showing the location of Leander Reeve House
- Location: Southeast of Hampton on Iowa Highway 134
- Coordinates: 42°40′36″N 93°09′49″W
- Built: 1854
- NRHP reference No.: 79000896
- Added to NRHP: July 17, 1979

The Leander Reeve House, also known as the Old Stone House, is a historic structure located near Geneva, Iowa in the United States. Leander Reeve came to Franklin County from Ashtabula County, Ohio in 1853. He initially worked as a trapper until he acquired 10 acres (4.0 ha) of land from Allison Phelps and began to farm. He built the stone house in 1854 and brought his family from Ohio the same year. It is the first permanent structure built in the county. His wife did not care for the pioneer lifestyle and they returned to Ohio three years later. Although some said she wanted to have her last child at her Ohio home, and she also didn't get along with her sister in law. Simeon Carter bought the house from the Reeves. His daughter and son-in-law, a lawyer named D. W. Dow, were the next people to live in the house. They were followed by 13 other families. The floor plan of the house has never been altered and it did not have electricity until the restoration committee had plug-ins installed. The house is still in excellent shape, and an Old Stone House Committee remains active through the Franklin County Historical Society. The house has been listed on the National Register of Historic Places since 1979.
