= Art Reinhart =

American baseball player (1899–1946)

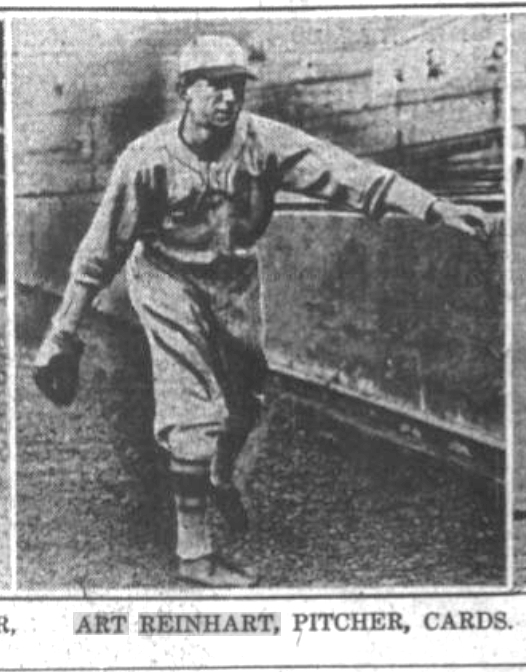
- shown circa 1926
- Pitcher
- Born: May 29, 1899; Ackley, Iowa, U.S.
- Died: November 11, 1946 (aged 47); Houston, Texas, U.S.
- Batted: Left Threw: Left

MLB debut
- April 26, 1919, for the St. Louis Cardinals

Last MLB appearance
- September 15, 1928, for the St. Louis Cardinals

MLB statistics
- Win–loss record: 30–18
- Earned run average: 3.60
- Strikeouts: 79
- Stats at Baseball Reference

Teams
- St. Louis Cardinals (1919, 1925–1928)

Arthur Conrad Reinhart (May 29, 1899 - November 11, 1946) was an American Major League Baseball pitcher from 1919 to 1928.

== Biography ==
Reinhart was in born in Ackley, Iowa, and attended the University of Iowa. He was a left-handed pitcher and pitched in the Texas League and other minor leagues.

Reinhart pitched for the St. Louis Cardinals from 1919 to 1928. He played in a total of 123 games, 45 as a starting pitcher. He had a record of 30 wins and 18 losses.

He was an exceptional hitting pitcher, compiling a .301 batting average (56-for-186) with 25 runs and 19 RBI. He recorded a .984 fielding percentage with only 2 errors in 122 total chances.

Reinhart died in Houston, Texas, and is interred at Oak Wood Cemetery in Ackley, Iowa.
