= City of Quincy v. Jackson =

Quincy v. Jackson
- Supreme Court of the United States

Argued January 9, 1885 Decided February 2, 1885
- Full case name: Quincy v. Jackson
- Citations: 113 U.S. 332 (more) 5 S. Ct. 544; 28 L. Ed. 1001

Court membership
- Chief Justice Morrison Waite Associate Justices Samuel F. Miller · Stephen J. Field; Joseph P. Bradley · John M. Harlan; William B. Woods · Stanley Matthews; Horace Gray · Samuel Blatchford

Case opinion
- Majority: Harlan, joined by unanimous

Quincy v. Jackson, 113 U.S. 332 (1885), was a writ of error brought to reverse a judgment by the court below by Jackson, a relator, who recovered a judgment against the City of Quincy, Illinois, for the sum of $9,546.24, with costs of suit.

== Background ==
There were no funds in the city's treasury out of which the judgment could be paid, and its corporate authorities refused to satisfy it, in the only way in which it can be paid, by a levy of taxes for that specific purpose. The judgment in the present action, which was commenced by a petition for mandamus, requires the City Council of Quincy to levy and collect a special tax sufficient to discharge the amount thereof with interest from the date of its rendition and also the costs of this and the former action. We have only to inquire whether the corporate authorities of the city have the power under the laws of Illinois to levy and collect such a tax.

It was conceded that the revenue of the city for its fiscal year ending March 31, 1885, to accrue from the taxes it could levy under the act of 1881, after meeting its necessary current expenses and other demands prior to that of the relator Jackson, will be insufficient to pay his judgment interest, and costs.

On behalf of the city, it was contended that when these bonds were issued, the act of 1863 prohibited any annual levy of taxes "to pay the debts and meet the general expenses of the city" in excess of fifty cents on each one hundred dollars of the assessed value of its real and personal property. To this it may be replied, as was done in Quincy v. Cooke in reference to similar language in the original charter of the city, that the act of 1863 related to debts and expenses incurred for ordinary municipal purposes, and not to indebtedness arising from railroad subscriptions, the authority to make which is not implied from any general grant of municipal power, but must be expressly conferred by statute. When the legislature in 1869 legalized and confirmed what the city council had previously done touching the subscription to the stock of the Mississippi and Missouri River Air Line Railroad Company, and thereby authorized bonds in payment thereof to be issued, it could not have been contemplated that indebtedness thus created would be met by such taxation as was permitted for ordinary municipal purposes. In giving authority to incur obligations for such extraordinary indebtedness, the legislature did not restrict its corporate authorities to the limit of taxation provided for ordinary debts and expenses. In Loan Association v. Topeka, 20 Wall. 660, the Court, after observing that the validity of a contract, which can only be fulfilled by a resort to taxation, depends on the power to levy the tax for that purpose, said:

It is therefore to be inferred that, when the legislature of the state authorizes a county or city to contract a debt by bond, it intends to authorize it to levy such taxes as are necessary to pay the debt, unless there is in the act itself, or in some general statute, a limitation upon the power of taxation which repels such an inference.

== Decision ==
So, in United States v. New Orleans, 98 U. S. 381, 98 U. S. 393:

When authority to borrow money or incur an obligation, in order to execute a public work, is conferred upon a municipal corporation, the power to levy a tax for its payment, or the discharge of the obligation, accompanies it, and this too without any special mention that such power is granted. This arises from the fact that such corporations seldom possess—so seldom, indeed, as to be exceptional—any means to discharge their pecuniary obligations except by taxation.

The same question arose in Ralls County v. United States, 105 U. S. 735, where it was said:

It must be considered as settled in this Court that when authority is granted by the legislative branch of the government to a municipality, or a subdivision of a state, to contract an extraordinary debt by the issue of negotiable securities, the power to levy taxes sufficient to meet at maturity the obligations to be incurred is conclusively implied, unless the law which confers the authority, or some general law in force at the time, clearly manifests a contrary legislative intention.

Again:

If what the law requires to be done can only be done through taxation, then taxation is authorized to the extent that may be needed, unless it is otherwise expressly declared. The power to tax in such cases is not an implied power, but a duty growing out of the power to contract. The one power is as much express as the other.

See also Parkersburg v. Brown, 106 U. S. 501. The doctrine announced in these cases is sustained by United States v. County of Macon, 99 U. S. 582, upon which the plaintiff in error relies; for, in that case, the very act, conferring upon the county authority to make a subscription to the stock of a railroad corporation, made special provision for a tax to meet the subscription, and thus negatived the inference that the legislature intended to permit any taxation beyond that allowed by that special act and the general laws of the state.

These decisions covered the present case, for, in the first place, neither the act of 1869, from which the city derived authority to issue negotiable bonds in payment of its subscription, nor any general law of the state, forbids, expressly or by necessary implication, taxation to the extent necessary to meet the obligations thus incurred, and, in the second place, the limitation imposed by the city's charter upon its power of taxation had reference to its ordinary municipal debts and expenses.

In reference to the act of 1881, it is only necessary to say that, if it refers to indebtedness for railroad subscriptions, the limit imposed by it cannot be made to apply to indebtedness created prior to its passage, accompanied, as the latter was, with power in the city at the time it was created, to impose taxation sufficient to discharge it.

The judgment was affirmed.

== See also ==
- Ackley School District v. Hall: Supreme Court case on defaulted municipal bonds from Iowa
- Findlay v. McAllister: Supreme Court case on defaulted county bonds from Missouri
- List of United States Supreme Court cases, volume 113
