= Ackley School District v. Hall =

- Supreme Court of the United States

Argued December 2–3, 1884 Decided January 19, 1885
- Full case name: Ackley School District v. Hall
- Citations: 113 U.S. 135 (more) 5 S. Ct. 371; 28 L. Ed. 954

Holding
- Municipal bonds issued under a statute that allows them to be paid at any time before the due date, are negotiable because they are payable at a time certain to arrive.

Court membership
- Chief Justice Morrison Waite Associate Justices Samuel F. Miller · Stephen J. Field; Joseph P. Bradley · John M. Harlan; William B. Woods · Stanley Matthews; Horace Gray · Samuel Blatchford

Case opinion
- Majority: Harlan, joined by unanimous

Ackley School District v. Hall, 113 U.S. 135 (1885), was a suit to recover principal and interest claimed to be due the defendant on negotiable bonds issued by the plaintiff.

== Background ==
Municipal bonds issued under the authority of law for the payment at all events to a named person or order a fixed sum of money at a designated tune therein limited, being endorsed in blank, is a negotiable security. Its negotiability is not affected by a provision of the statute under which it was issued that it should be "payable at the pleasure of the district at any time before due."

An act of the Legislature of Iowa entitled "An act to authorize independent school districts to borrow money and issue bonds therefor for the purpose of erecting and completing schoolhouses, legalizing bonds heretofore issued, and making school orders draw six percent interest in certain cases" is not in violation of the provision in the Constitution of that state which declares that "every act shall embrace but one subject and matters properly connected therewith, which subject shall be expressed in the title.

By an Act of the General Assembly of the State of Iowa approved April 6, 1868, it is provided that independent school districts shall have power and authority to borrow money for the purpose of erecting and completing school houses by issuing negotiable bonds of the independent district, to run any period not exceeding ten years, drawing a rate of interest not exceeding ten percent, which interest may be paid semiannually, which indebtedness shall be binding and obligatory on the independent school district for the use of which said loan shall have been made.

The Independent School District of Ackley, Hardin County, Iowa, promises to pay to Foster Brothers, or order at the Hardin County Bank at Eldora, Iowa, on the first day of May, 1872, five hundred dollars for value received, with interest at the rate of ten percent per annum, said interest payable semiannually, on the first day of May and November in each year thereafter at the Hardin County Bank at Eldora, on the presentation and surrender of the interest coupons hereto attached

This bond is issued by the board of school directors by authority of an election of the voters of said school district held on the 23d day of August, 1869, in conformity with the provisions of chapter 98, acts 12, General Assembly of the State of Iowa.

In testimony whereof the said Independent School District, by the board of directors thereof, have caused the same to be signed by the President and secretary, this first day of November, 1869.

Treasurer of Independent School District, Ackley, Hardin County, Iowa, will pay the holder hereof, on the 1st day of November, 1874 at the Hardin County Bank at Eldora, Iowa, twenty-five dollars, for interest due on school house bond No. 8.

== Decision ==
The defendant,...who is averred to be a citizen of New York, became the holder of eight of these obligations with interest coupons attached, each one being endorsed in blank by Foster Brothers, the original payees. This suit was brought to recover the amount due thereon, without any averment in the pleadings as to the citizenship of the payees. The district made defense upon various grounds. The case was tried by the court without the intervention of a jury, and there was a general finding for the plaintiff, upon which a judgment was entered against the district. To that finding and judgment the defendant excepted (but without preserving, by bill of exceptions, the evidence upon which the court acted), and brought this writ of error.

Judgment was affirmed.

== See also ==
- City of Quincy v. Jackson: Supreme Court case on defaulted municipal bonds form Illinois
- Findlay v. McAllister: Supreme Court case on defaulted county bonds from Missouri
