= Sauerkraut Days =

- Frequency: Annually
- Location: Ackley, Iowa
- Country: USA
- Inaugurated: 1902

Sauerkraut Days is an annual festival event held in Ackley, Iowa during the summer (typically in June). The first one was held in 1902. The Ackley Chamber of Commerce organizes and operates the festival.

The festival itself consists of several activities. There are entertainers such as singers, bands, magicians, midway rides, as well as a dog show and parades. There is also a tractor pull, put on by the Central Iowa Tractor Association. The event culminates in a large fireworks display at the local country club.

There was no event held in 1917–18, 1942–45 & 2020.

The festival celebrated its 120th anniversary in 2023.
