= Franklin Merrell-Wolff =

American philosopher

- Born: Franklin Fowler Wolff; 11 July 1887; Pasadena, California, U.S.
- Died: 4 October 1985 (aged 98); Inyo, California, U.S.
- Writing career
- Genre: Esoteric philosophy
- Notable works: Pathways Through To Space; The Philosophy of Consciousness Without an Object

Franklin Merrell-Wolff (born Franklin Fowler Wolff; 11 July 1887 – 4 October 1985) was an American mystic and esoteric philosopher. After formal education in philosophy and mathematics at Stanford and Harvard, Wolff devoted himself to the goal of transcending the normal limits of human consciousness. After exploring various mystical teachings and paths, he dedicated himself to the path of jnana yoga and the writings of Shankara, the expounder of the Advaita Vedanta school of Hindu philosophy.

== Life ==
Franklin Fowler Wolff was born in Pasadena, California in 1887. He was raised as a Methodist, but abandoned Christianity during his youth. Wolff studied mathematics and philosophy at Stanford and Harvard. At Stanford, he was elected to Phi Beta Kappa society in 1911. He briefly taught mathematics at Stanford in 1914, but left academia the following year. In 1920, Wolff married Sarah Merrell Briggs. The couple joined their original surnames; hence Wolff became Franklin Merrell-Wolff. Merrell-Wolff and his wife founded an esoteric group called the Assembly of Man in 1928, which congregated in Tuttle Creek Ashram in the Sierra Nevada mountains near Mount Whitney. Sarah Merrell-Wolff, also known as Sherifa, died in 1959. Franklin Merrell-Wolff remarried and lived the rest of his life in the mountains until his death in 1985. He authored various books and a great number of recorded lectures explaining his philosophy.

== Publications and philosophy ==
Wolff's publications are "an elaboration of the significance of [his] mystical experiences," described by religious scholar Arthur Versluis as a "consistent and extensive body of work with a unique vocabulary and set of concepts". In his works, Wolff described his mystic experiences and their implications, examining his experience in the light of his extensive knowledge of mathematics and philosophy. Although he started an Ashram, his form of spirituality was not necessarily compatible with a religious structure.

In his book Pathways Through to Space, Wolff describes having a profound spiritual realization in 1936, which provided the basis for his transcendental philosophy. It was induced "in a context of sustained reflective observation and deep thought," rather than by the usual practice of meditation. He called this experience the "Fundamental Realization". In its aftermath, Wolff found himself being in a state of euphoric consciousness he called the "Current of Ambrosia", which he described as being "above time, space and causality". It also led Wolff to a state of "High Indifference", or consciousness without an object. At the center of these experiences was the realization of "Primordial consciousness", which, according to Wolff, is beyond and prior to the subject or the object and is unaffected by their presence or absence.

The notion of "Introception", or "Knowledge through Identity," "[describes] the inward focus of consciousness upon its own nature". (Note: Compare svasaṃvedana in Buddhism, Chinul's "turning back the radiance," also found with other Zen teachers, and svayam-prakāśa in Advaita Vedanta.)

Wolff's other published books detailing his experience and philosophy include The Philosophy of Consciousness Without an Object and Transformations in Consciousness: The Metaphysics and Epistemology (originally published under the title Introceptualism).

== Selected works ==
- Merrell-Wolff, Franklin (1973). Pathways Through To Space (New York : Julian Press). ISBN 0-517-54961-1.
- Merrell-Wolff, Franklin (1973). The Philosophy of Consciousness Without an Object (New York : Julian Press). ISBN 0-517-54949-2.
- Merrell-Wolff, Franklin (1994). Franklin Merrell-Wolff's Experience and Philosophy: a personal record of transformation and a discussion of transcendental consciousness: containing his Philosophy of Consciousness Without An Object and his Pathways Through To Space (Albany : SUNY Press). ISBN 0-7914-1964-9
- Merrell-Wolff, Franklin (1995). Transformations in Consciousness: The Metaphysics and Epistemology, edited by Ron Leonard (Albany : SUNY Press). ISBN 0-7914-2676-9.

== See also ==
- American philosophy
- List of American philosophers

== Sources ==
Printed sources

- Versluis, Arthur (2014), American Gurus: From American Transcendentalism to New Age Religion, Oxford University Press, ISBN 0199368139

Web-sources
