= Dublin, New York =

Hamlet in New York, United States

Coordinates: 42°59′41″N 76°55′20″W

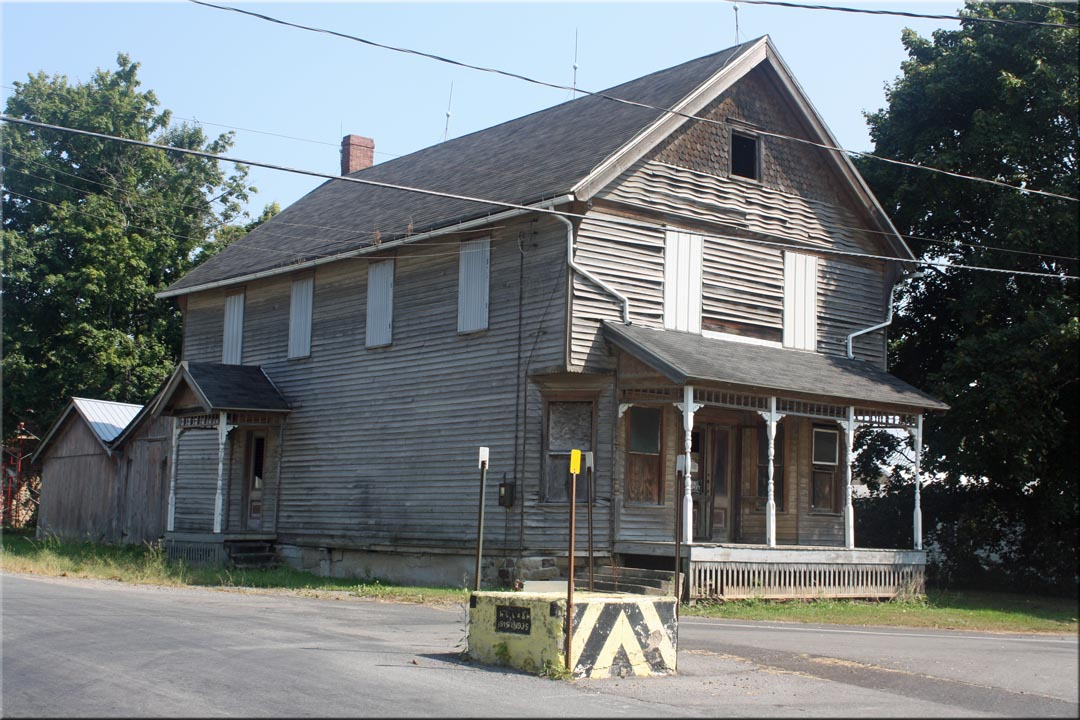
The old well and historic building at the intersection of Dublin and Nine Foot roads in the hamlet of Dublin, New York

Dublin is a hamlet in the Town of Junius, Seneca County, New York, United States. It is located nine miles (14 km) northwest of the Village of Waterloo, at an elevation of 443 feet (135 m). The primary intersection in the hamlet is at Dublin Road (CR 109) and Nine Foot Road (CR 108). Government offices for the Town of Junius are located in the hamlet.

Dublin was originally known as "Junius Post Office," or simply called Junius after the town according to old township maps.

An old well sits in the middle of Nine Foot Road at the intersection of Dublin Road. On the southeast corner is a historic two-story vacant building in fair condition, facing Nine Foot Road.
