= Junius, New York =

- Town
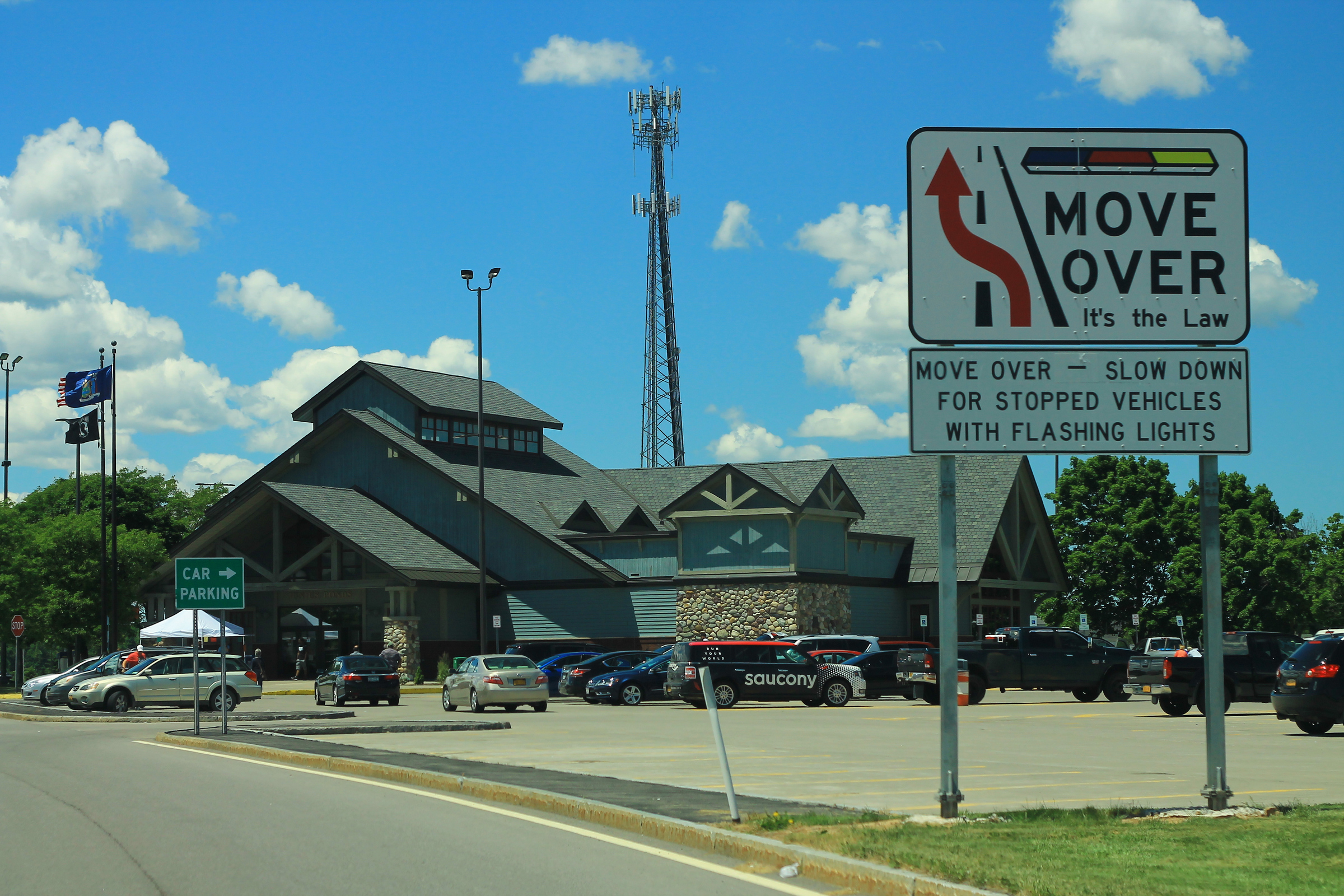
- The New York State Thruway's Junius Ponds Service Area, as seen in 2018

- Location within the state of New York
- Coordinates: 42°59′N 76°55′W
- Country: United States
- State: New York
- County: Seneca
- Settled: 1795
- Established: February 12, 1803

Government
  - Type: Town Board
  - Supervisor: C. Ernest Brownell
  - Clerk: Mary T. Prosser
  - Court: Justice Brian S. Erway; Justice Brian J. Laird

Area
  - Total: 26.85 sq mi (69.55 km^{2})
  - Land: 26.71 sq mi (69.18 km^{2})
  - Water: 0.15 sq mi (0.38 km^{2})
- Elevation: 518 ft (158 m)

Population (2020)
  - Total: 1,370 ▼
  - Estimate (2021): 1,364
  - Density: 54.8/sq mi (21.16/km^{2})
- Time zone: UTC-5 (Eastern (EST))
  - Summer (DST): UTC-4 (EDT)
- Area codes: 315 and 680
- FIPS code: 36-38858
- GNIS feature ID: 0979112
- Website: http://www.townofjunius.org/

Junius is a town in Seneca County, New York, United States. The population was 1,370 at the 2020 census.

The Town of Junius is in the northwest corner of the county and is east of Geneva, New York.

There is no post office in the Town of Junius. The primary postal district covering much of the area is ZIP Code 14433 for Clyde. Other sections of the town have either a Zip Code of 13165 for Waterloo, ZIP Code 14489 for Lyons or ZIP Code 14532 for Phelps.

Government offices for the town are located in Dublin.

== History ==
Junius was part of the Central New York Military Tract used to pay soldiers of the American Revolution. The region was first settled around 1795.

The town was set apart from the Town of Fayette in 1803. Junius was subsequently divided to form new towns: Wolcott, in Wayne County (1807), Galen also in Wayne County (1812), Seneca Falls (1829), Tyre (1829), and Waterloo (1829).

The Cobblestone Farmhouse at 1027 Stone Church Rd., Cobblestone Farmhouse at 1111 Stone Church Road, Cobblestone Farmhouse at 1229 Birdsey Road, and John Graves Cobblestone Farmhouse are listed on the National Register of Historic Places.

== Geography ==
According to the United States Census Bureau, the town has a total area of 26.9 square miles (70 km^{2}), of which, 26.7 square miles (69 km^{2}) of it is land and 0.1 square miles (0.26 km^{2}) of it (0.41%) is water.

The west town line is the border of Ontario County, and the north town line is the border of Wayne County.

The New York State Thruway (Interstate 90) passes across the town. New York State Route 318 is an east-west highway in the town running parallel to the Thruway. New York State Route 414 is a north-south highway crossing a few arces in the far north-eastern part of Junius.

== Demographics ==
Historical population
| Census | Pop. | Note | %± |
|---|---|---|---|
| 1820 | 5,113 | | — |
| 1830 | 1,581 | | −69.1% |
| 1840 | 1,594 | | 0.8% |
| 1850 | 1,516 | | −4.9% |
| 1860 | 1,316 | | −13.2% |
| 1870 | 1,420 | | 7.9% |
| 1880 | 1,356 | | −4.5% |
| 1890 | 1,134 | | −16.4% |
| 1900 | 1,053 | | −7.1% |
| 1910 | 957 | | −9.1% |
| 1920 | 829 | | −13.4% |
| 1930 | 775 | | −6.5% |
| 1940 | 738 | | −4.8% |
| 1950 | 846 | | 14.6% |
| 1960 | 871 | | 3.0% |
| 1970 | 1,111 | | 27.6% |
| 1980 | 1,354 | | 21.9% |
| 1990 | 1,354 | | 0.0% |
| 2000 | 1,362 | | 0.6% |
| 2010 | 1,471 | | 8.0% |
| 2020 | 1,370 | | −6.9% |
| 2021 (est.) | 1,364 | | −0.4% |
U.S. Decennial Census

As of the census of 2010, there were 1,471 people, 543 households, and 381 families residing in the town. The population density was 55.1 inhabitants per square mile (21.3/km^{2}). The racial makeup of the town was 97.6% White, 0.3% Black or African American, 0.3% Native American, 0.2% Asian, 0.0% Pacific Islander, 0.6% from other races, and 1.% from two or more races. Hispanic or Latino of any race were 2.5% of the population.

There were 543 households, out of which 28.2% had children under the age of 18 living with them, 55.2% were married couples living together, 8.7% had a female householder with no husband present, and 29.8% were non-families. 21.5% of all households were made up of individuals, and 7.0% had someone living alone who was 65 years of age or older. The average household size was 2.71 and the average family size was 3.15.

In the town, the population was spread out, with 29.3% under the age of 20, 5.5% from 20 to 24, 22.3% from 25 to 44, 29.2% from 45 to 64, and 13.8% who were 65 years of age or older. The median age was 39.4 years. For every 100 females, there were 103.5 males. For every 100 females age 18 and over, there were 100.4 males.

The median income for a household in the town was $45,350, and the median income for a family was $55,529. Males had a median income of $37,500 versus $34,625 for females. The per capita income for the town was $20.833. About 12.9% of families and 25.4% of the population were below the poverty line, including 45.7% of those under age 18 and 24.2% of those age 65 or over.

=== Housing ===
There were 608 housing units at an average density of 22.8 per square mile (8.8/km^{2}). 10.7% of housing units were vacant.

There were 543 occupied housing units in the town. 445 were owner-occupied units (82.0%), while 98 were renter-occupied (18.0%). The homeowner vacancy rate was 2.0% of total units. The rental unit vacancy rate was 8.4%.

== Communities and locations in Junius ==
- Dublin – A hamlet in the central part of the town, formerly called "Junius Post Office." The community is at the junction of County Roads 108 and 109.
- Junius Ponds – A cluster of ponds near the west town line. The name is also used for a nearby service area on the Thruway.
- Malcom – A location on NY-414 in the northeast of the town.
- Stone Church Corner – A hamlet on NY-318.
- Thompson – A hamlet at the west town line in the northwest of Junius on County Road 109.
- West Junius is a hamlet, not in the Town of Junius, but just west of the west town line in Ontario County

== Notable people ==
- Ruby I. Gilbert, business woman
- Emma L. Shaw, editor
