= Findlay v. McAllister =

- Supreme Court of the United States

Submitted December 2, 1884 Decided January 12, 1885
- Full case name: Findlay v. McAllister
- Citations: 113 U.S. 104 (more) 5 S. Ct. 401; 28 L. Ed. 930

Court membership
- Chief Justice Morrison Waite Associate Justices Samuel F. Miller · Stephen J. Field; Joseph P. Bradley · John M. Harlan; William B. Woods · Stanley Matthews; Horace Gray · Samuel Blatchford

Case opinions
- Majority: Woods, joined by Waite, Bradley, Harlan, Matthews, Gray, Blatchford
- Dissent: Miller, Field (without opinions)

Findlay v. McAllister, 113 U.S. 104 (1885), was a suit brought against Thomas McAllister and 14 other defendants, to recover damages as follows:

== Background ==
Findlay, the plaintiff, owned bonds with coupons issued by Scotland County, Missouri, which were recovered on September 25, 1877 in the same circuit court where action was brought, with a judgment on the coupons against the county in the amount of $4,008.86. The county failed to pay the judgment, so the circuit court issued a peremptory writ of mandamus, which commanded the county court to levy and cause to be collected a special tax on all taxable property within the county in order to pay the judgment, including interest as well as other costs. This was also ordered for several other plaintiffs in like circumstances.

The county court levied a special tax, called a 'judgment tax,' with an amount sufficient to pay off all the judgments, and placed it on the books of the county to be delivered to the county tax collector for collection of the tax.

After the special tax had been levied, and the tax-book placed in the hands of the collector for collection, the defendants, with about 2,000 other evil-disposed persons, all residents of Scotland county, conspired to hinder and prevent the county court and the collector from collecting and paying the special tax. They did this in order to try and depreciate the value of the bonds held by the plaintiff in an attempt to compromise the judgment and bonds at much less than their value. This was done unlawfully and maliciously, and in contempt of the orders and mandates of the circuit court.

The defendants and their confederates organized into an association called 'The Tax-payers Association of Scotland County,' with branch organizations in various school-districts of the county, for the purpose, among other things, of resisting the collection of the special tax, and the defendants and their confederates did pledge themselves to contribute of their means and influence, and to protect each other in all efforts made, to resist the payment thereof. In furtherance of their design, the defendants and their confederates, members of said association, made and published threats of violence against the attorneys of the plaintiff, who were employed to represent him in the collection of his judgment, and gave out and circulated the threat that no person would be allowed to bid upon or purchase any property that might be offered for sale by the collector to enforce the payment of the special tax, intending thereby to intimidate any person from bidding upon or purchasing any property offered for sale by the collector for the payment thereof. To induce the tax-payers of the county to join the association and aid in carrying out their unlawful conspiracy, the defendants and their confederates falsely and fraudulently gave out and published that such bonds and special tax were illegal, null, and void, and that they were under no obligation, legal or moral, to pay the same, well knowing that such declarations were false.

During the month of February, 1878, the collector of the county levied upon a large number of horses and mules, and advertised them to be sold on February 28, 1878, at Memphis, in said county of Scotland; whereupon the defendants and their confederates, in order to prevent the sale of the property so levied on, and prevent the payment of the plaintiff's judgment, and so to harass and wrong him as to induce him to compromise his judgment and bonds at much less than their value, assembled in vast numbers at the time and place advertised for the sale, and, by their combined influence, threats, and hostile demonstrations, did so overawe and intimidate the persons who had gone to the place of sale, for the purpose of and with intent to bid on the property, as to prevent them from bidding when the same was offered for sale; and, by reason of such combined influence, threats, and menaces, the defendants and their confederates, members of said association, acting under its orders, did prevent any person from bidding on the property when so offered for sale, and did prevent it from being sold.

The unlawful combination and conspiracy of the defendants, to injure and defraud the plaintiff, and prevent the collection of his judgment, still exists; and, by reason of the combined influence, threats, menaces, and hostile demonstrations of the defendants, the tax-payers of Scotland county are overawed and intimidated, and so influenced that they do not pay the special tax, nor has the collector, by reason of said combination and association, been able to collect the same. The plaintiff, by reason of the premises, has been damaged to the amount of his judgment, to-wit, $4,008.86, with interest thereon from September 25, 1877, and costs; for which, with $3,000 exemplary damages, he demands judgment against the defendants.

The defendants demurred to the petition. In support of their demurrer they assigned and argued, both in the circuit court and this court, the following grounds: (1) That the plaintiff had no such legal property interest in the taxes in question as to entitle him to maintain actions for conspiracy; (2) that he had sustained no legal damages by the alleged acts of the defendants. The court sustained the demurrer, and rendered a judgment for the defendants, to reverse which the plaintiff brings this writ of error.

== Decision ==
It was found that the plaintiff could not sue the collector; for he has done his duty, and no suit lies against him. Unless the plaintiff has a cause of action against the defendants, he is without remedy. To hold that the facts of this case do not give a cause of action against them would be to decide that a citizen might be subjected to a willful and malicious injury at the hands of private persons without redress; that an organized band of conspirators could, without subjecting themselves to any liability, fraudulently and maliciously obstruct and defeat the process of the courts, issued for the satisfaction of the judgment of a private suitor, and thus render the judgment nugatory and worthless. Such a conclusion would be contrary to the principles of the common law and of right and justice.

It is no answer to the case made by the petition to say, as the defendant, by his counsel, does, that the judgment of the plaintiff is still in force and bearing interest, and the liability of the county still remains undisturbed. What is a judgment worth that cannot be enforced? The gravamen of the plaintiff's complaint is that the defendants have obstructed, and continue to obstruct, the collection of his judgment, and he avers that he has been damaged thereby to the amount of his judgment and interest; in other words, that by reason of the unlawful and malicious conduct of the defendants, his judgment has been rendered worthless. To reply to this that the judgment still remains in force on the records of the court is an inadequate answer to the plaintiff's cause of action.

From the views expressed by the higher court, it was determined that the circuit court erred in sustaining the demurrer to the petition. Its judgment was reversed, and the cause remanded for further proceedings in conformity with this opinion; and it was so ordered.

Justices Miller and Field dissented.

== See also ==
- Ackley School District v. Hall: Supreme Court case on defaulted municipal bonds from Iowa
- City of Quincy v. Jackson: Supreme Court case on defaulted municipal bonds form Illinois
- List of United States Supreme Court cases, volume 113
