= Stonehouse (surname) =

Stonehouse is an English surname. Notable people with the surname include:

== Arts and entertainment ==
- Cathy Stonehouse, British-Canadian poet
- Ethel Nhill Victoria Stonehouse (1883–1964), Australian novelist and poet
- Ruth Stonehouse (1892–1941), American actress

== Military ==
- Brian Stonehouse (1918–1998), British Special Operations Executive
- Herbert Arthur Stonehouse (1909–1984), British naval officer

== Politics ==
- Aaron Stonehouse, Australian politician
- John Stonehouse (1925–1988), British politician who faked his disappearance

- Stonehouse (TV series) - 2023 British TV series based on John Stonehouse's life.

== Religion ==
- George Stonehouse (1808–1871), Baptist minister in South Australia
- Ned Stonehouse (1902–1962), New Testament scholar

== Science ==
- Bernard Stonehouse (1926–2014), British polar scientist
- Nicola Stonehouse, British professor of molecular virology

== Sport ==
- Jack Stonehouse, American football player
- Jimmy Stonehouse (born 1964), South African rugby union coach
- Ken Stonehouse (born 1956), Australian rules footballer
- Kevin Stonehouse (1959–2019), English footballer
- Ryan Stonehouse (born 1999), American football player

== Other ==
- Alpheus George Barnes Stonehouse (1862–1931), circus owner
- Kenneth Stonehouse (1908–1943), journalist
