= Cobblestone Farmhouse at 1229 Birdsey Road =

Historic house in New York, United States

- U.S. National Register of Historic Places
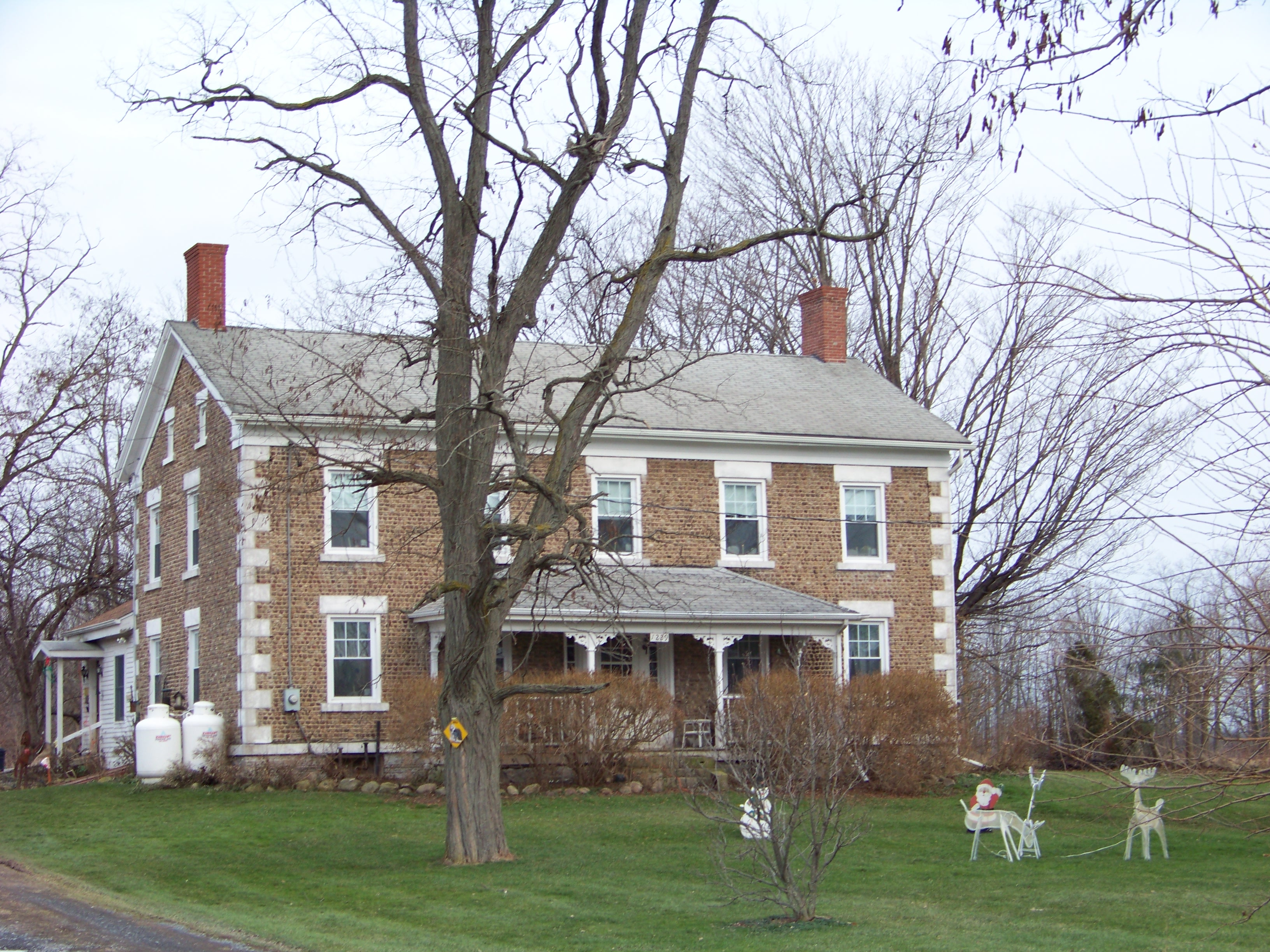

- Location within New York Location within the United States
- Location: 1229 Birdsey Road, Junius, New York
- Coordinates: 42°58′1.3368″N 76°51′51.015″W
- Area: 12 acres (4.9 ha)
- Built: 1840
- MPS: Cobblestone Architecture of New York State MPS
- NRHP reference No.: 08000772
- Added to NRHP: August 6, 2008

Cobblestone Farmhouse at 1229 Birdsey Road is a farmhouse in the town of Junius, New York, in Seneca County, New York. It is significant as a well-preserved example of cobblestone architecture, in a vernacular Greek Revival style. North of the house, there is also a large barn believed to date to the late 19th century. This property was listed on the National Register of Historic Places on August 6, 2008. It is the sixth property listed as a featured property of the week in a program of the National Park Service that began in July, 2008.

== House ==
The house is thought to have been built in the 1830s or 1840s.

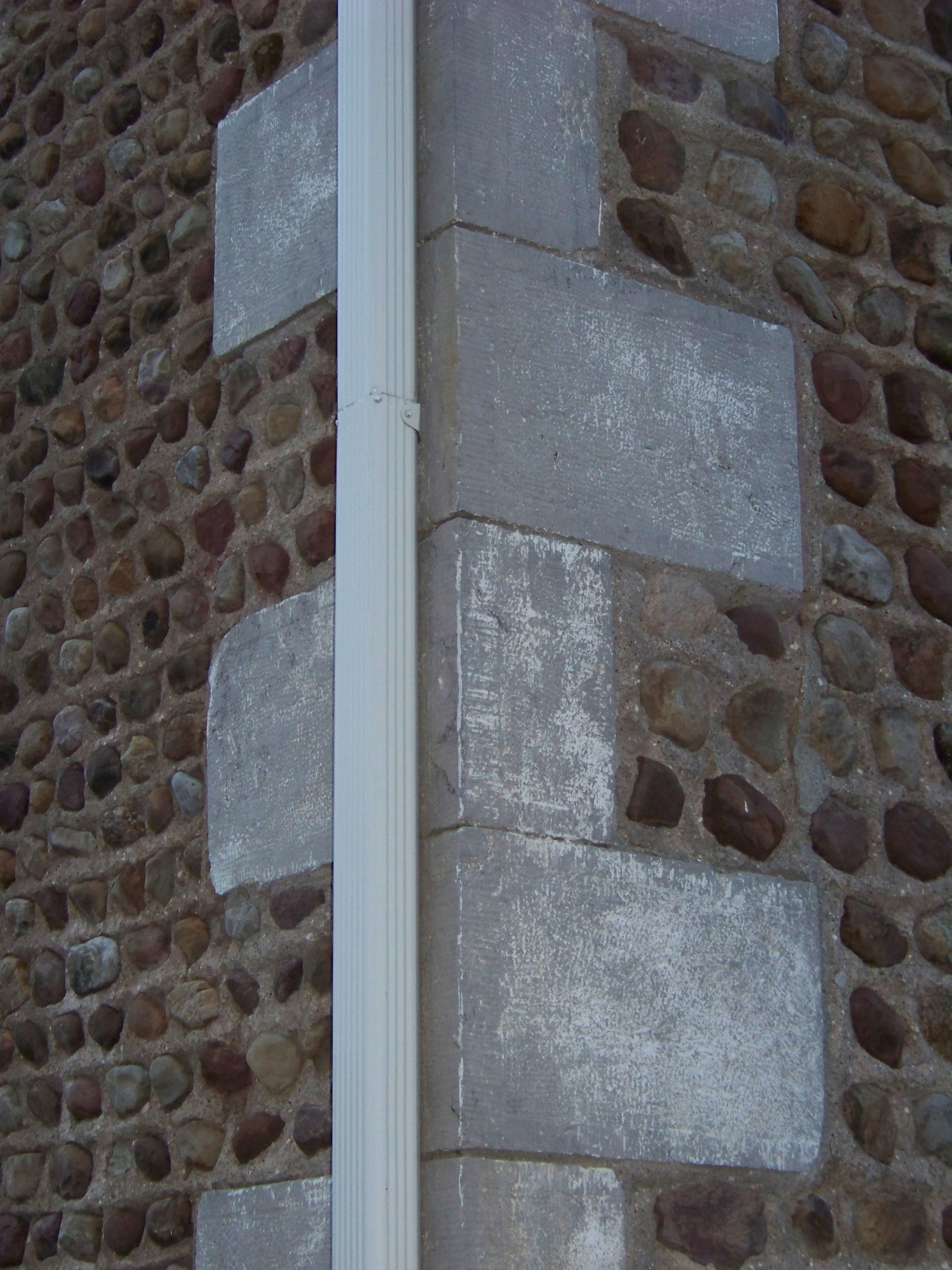
These are the quoins on southeast corner of house. Note the difference in workmanship between the wall on the left (south side) and the wall on the right (rear), showing that the better craftsmen worked on the more visible surfaces of the house.

The walls of the two-story structure are made with rounded field stones between limestone quoins that both decorate and stabilize the walls. The multi-colored field cobbles are held in place with limestone mortared "V" joints, typical of cobblestone construction of the Middle Period. The quoins are twelve inches (300 mm) high, and there are three to four courses of cobblestones for each quoin. The house is laid out with two windows on either side of a central entrance. The one-story porch outside the front door has Victorian details under a hip roof. The Greek Revival features of the entrance include square pilasters and half side-lights. The builder and/or architect is not known.

== Architecture ==
Cobblestone architecture was developed in New York State to a high degree. A survey identified 660 cobblestone structures in 21 New York counties. There may be approximately 300 elsewhere in the United States, concentrated in Michigan, Ohio, Illinois, and Vermont.

== Barn ==
The barn on the property is constructed of wood siding attached vertically to the frame. It is itself significant as a typical example of late 19th century barn construction.

== Location ==
The property is located on Birdsey Road, a north–south county road, directly adjacent to the New York State Thruway, effectively on the northeast corner of that intersection. The town of Junius remains largely rural in character. The 12-acre (49,000 m^{2}) property is what remains of the original 100-acre (0.40 km^{2}) farmstead. The topography is fairly flat, and the land mostly cleared, with scattered groups of trees.

There are three other cobblestone farmhouses in the same township which are also listed on the National Register: Cobblestone Farmhouse at 1027 Stone Church Road, Cobblestone Farmhouse at 1111 Stone Church Road, and John Graves Cobblestone Farmhouse.

== See also ==
- Cobblestone Historic District
