= Geneva, Iowa =

- City
- Location of Geneva, Iowa
- Coordinates: 42°40′29″N 93°07′38″W
- Country: USA
- State: Iowa
- County: Franklin

Area
  - Total: 0.41 sq mi (1.06 km^{2})
  - Land: 0.41 sq mi (1.06 km^{2})
  - Water: 0 sq mi (0.00 km^{2})
- Elevation: 1,102 ft (336 m)

Population (2020)
  - Total: 136
  - Density: 332.7/sq mi (128.47/km^{2})
- Time zone: UTC-6 (Central (CST))
  - Summer (DST): UTC-5 (CDT)
- ZIP code: 50633
- Area code: 641
- FIPS code: 19-30135
- GNIS feature ID: 2394877

Geneva is a city in Franklin County, Iowa, United States. The population was 136 at the time of the 2020 census.

== History ==
Geneva was platted in 1871, and it was incorporated as a town in 1903.

== Geography ==
According to the United States Census Bureau, the city has a total area of 0.42 square miles (1.09 km^{2}), all land.

== Demographics ==
Historical populations
| Year | Pop. | ±% |
|---|---|---|
| 1910 | 199 | — |
| 1920 | 244 | +22.6% |
| 1930 | 249 | +2.0% |
| 1940 | 268 | +7.6% |
| 1950 | 242 | −9.7% |
| 1960 | 219 | −9.5% |
| 1970 | 201 | −8.2% |
| 1980 | 218 | +8.5% |
| 1990 | 169 | −22.5% |
| 2000 | 171 | +1.2% |
| 2010 | 165 | −3.5% |
| 2020 | 136 | −17.6% |
Source:"U.S. Census website". United States Census Bureau. and Iowa Data Center; Source: U.S. Decennial Census

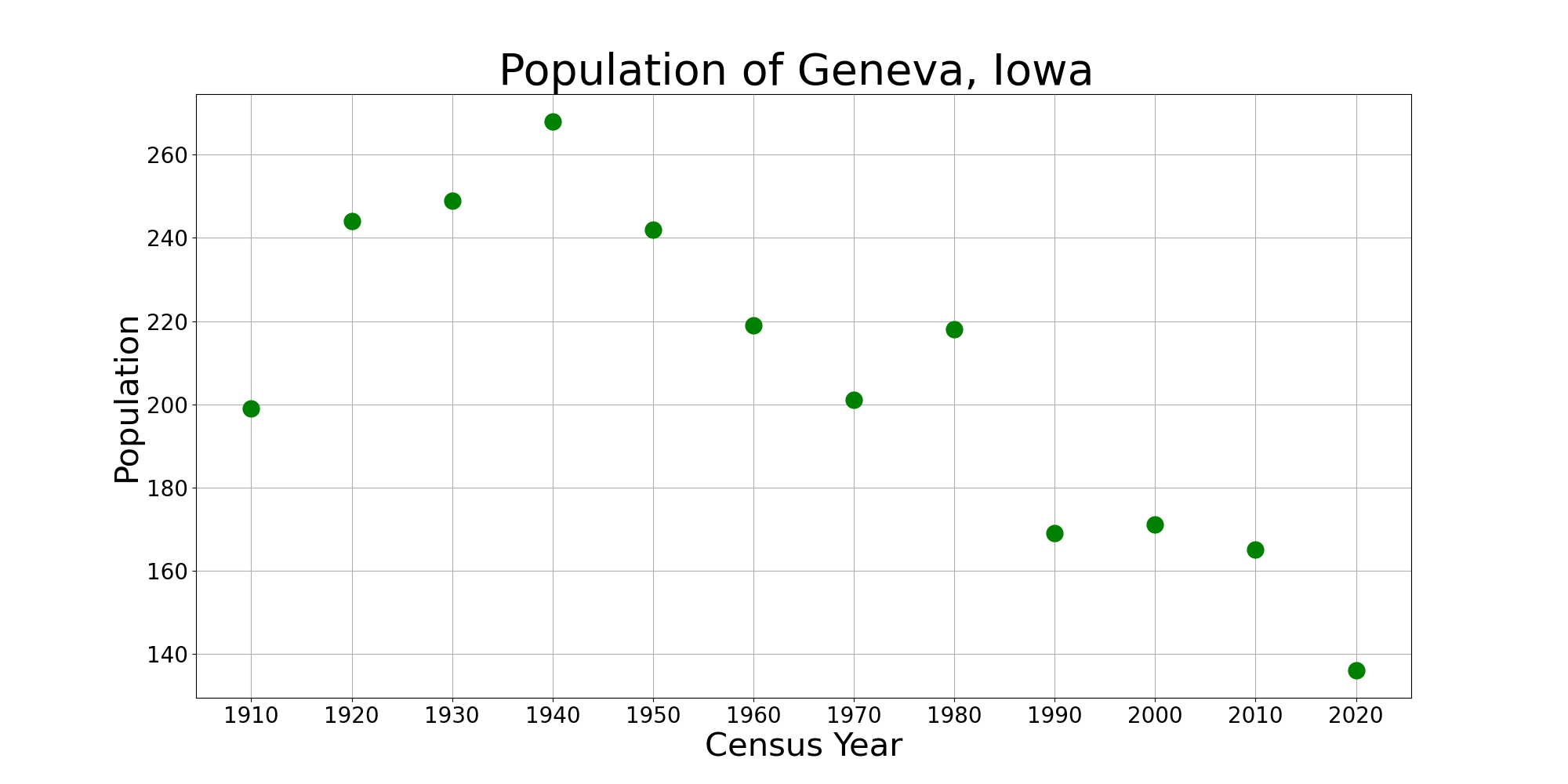
The population of Geneva, Iowa from U.S. census data

=== 2020 census ===
As of the census of 2020, there were 136 people, 64 households, and 37 families residing in the city. The population density was 332.7 inhabitants per square mile (128.5/km^{2}). There were 73 housing units at an average density of 178.6 per square mile (69.0/km^{2}). The racial makeup of the city was 90.4% White, 0.0% Black or African American, 0.0% Native American, 0.7% Asian, 0.0% Pacific Islander, 0.0% from other races and 8.8% from two or more races. Hispanic or Latino persons of any race comprised 1.5% of the population.

Of the 64 households, 28.1% of which had children under the age of 18 living with them, 43.8% were married couples living together, 7.8% were cohabitating couples, 23.4% had a female householder with no spouse or partner present and 25.0% had a male householder with no spouse or partner present. 42.2% of all households were non-families. 39.1% of all households were made up of individuals, 17.2% had someone living alone who was 65 years old or older.

The median age in the city was 42.6 years. 23.5% of the residents were under the age of 20; 4.4% were between the ages of 20 and 24; 23.5% were from 25 and 44; 22.8% were from 45 and 64; and 25.7% were 65 years of age or older. The gender makeup of the city was 51.5% male and 48.5% female.

=== 2010 census ===
As of the census of 2010, there were 165 people, 68 households, and 42 families residing in the city. The population density was 392.9 inhabitants per square mile (151.7/km^{2}). There were 74 housing units at an average density of 176.2 per square mile (68.0/km^{2}). The racial makeup of the city was 98.2% White and 1.8% from two or more races. Hispanic or Latino of any race were 0.6% of the population.

There were 68 households, of which 30.9% had children under the age of 18 living with them, 51.5% were married couples living together, 7.4% had a female householder with no husband present, 2.9% had a male householder with no wife present, and 38.2% were non-families. 32.4% of all households were made up of individuals, and 16.1% had someone living alone who was 65 years of age or older. The average household size was 2.43 and the average family size was 3.12.

The median age in the city was 40.2 years. 24.2% of residents were under the age of 18; 8.6% were between the ages of 18 and 24; 21.8% were from 25 to 44; 27.9% were from 45 to 64; and 17.6% were 65 years of age or older. The gender makeup of the city was 46.7% male and 53.3% female.

=== 2000 census ===
As of the census of 2000, there were 171 people, 69 households, and 42 families residing in the city. The population density was 400.4 inhabitants per square mile (154.6/km^{2}). There were 77 housing units at an average density of 180.3 per square mile (69.6/km^{2}). The racial makeup of the city was 100.00% White. Hispanic or Latino of any race were 0.58% of the population.

There were 69 households, out of which 29.0% had children under the age of 18 living with them, 55.1% were married couples living together, 4.3% had a female householder with no husband present, and 37.7% were non-families. 34.8% of all households were made up of individuals, and 23.2% had someone living alone who was 65 years of age or older. The average household size was 2.48 and the average family size was 3.28.

The population was 29.8% under the age of 18, 5.8% from 18 to 24, 22.2% from 25 to 44, 24.0% from 45 to 64, and 18.1% who were 65 years of age or older. The median age was 40 years. For every 100 females, there were 78.1 males. For every 100 females age 18 and over, there were 81.8 males.

The median income for a household in the city was $33,542, and the median income for a family was $40,625. Males had a median income of $33,750 versus $20,000 for females. The per capita income for the city was $15,112. None of the families and 5.9% of the population were living below the poverty line, including no under eighteens and 8.5% of those over 64.

== Education ==
AGWSR Community School District operates area public schools. The district formed on July 1, 2001, with the merger of the Wellsburg-Steamboat Rock Community School District and the Ackley–Geneva Community School District.
