= Cobblestone Farmhouse at 1027 Stone Church Road =

Historic house in New York, United States

- Cobblestone Farmhouse at 1027 Stone Church Rd.
- U.S. National Register of Historic Places
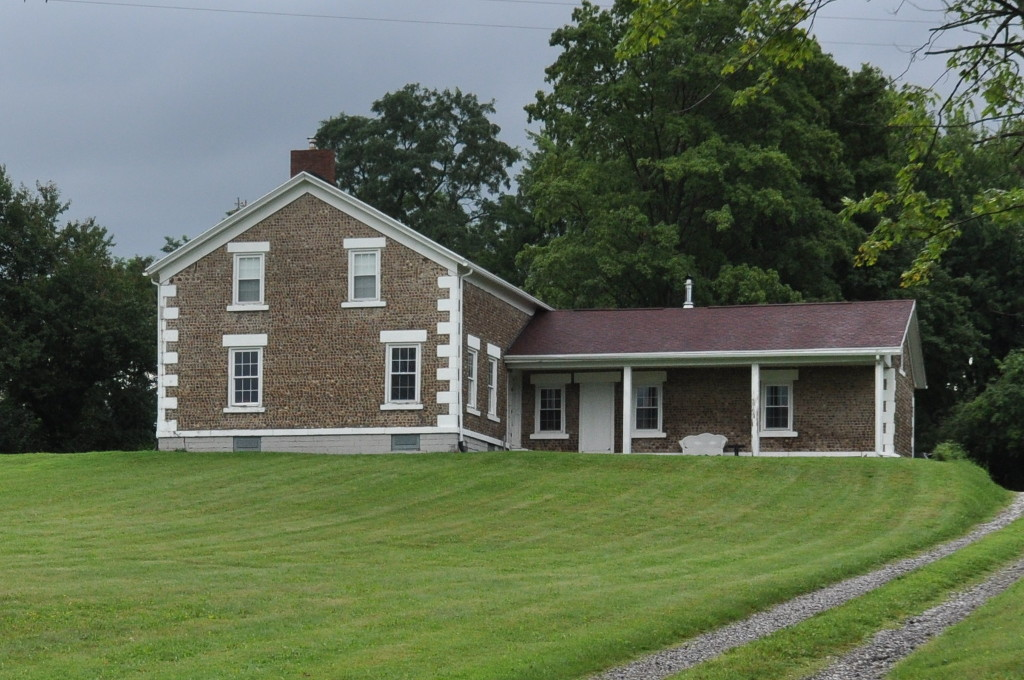

- Location within New York Location within the United States
- Location: 1027 Stone Church Rd., Junius, New York
- Coordinates: 42°58′34″N 76°53′5″W
- Area: 4.3 acres (1.7 ha)
- Built: c. 1840
- Architectural style: Greek Revival
- MPS: Cobblestone Architecture of New York State MPS
- NRHP reference No.: 07001017
- Added to NRHP: September 28, 2007

1027 Stone Church Road is a historic house located at the address of the same name in Junius, Seneca County, New York.

== Description and history ==
It is a vernacular Greek Revival style, cobblestone L-shaped farmhouse. It consists of a 1 1/2-story, gable-roofed main block with a 1-story former kitchen wing. It was built in about 1840, and is constructed of irregularly sized and variously colored field cobbles. The house is among the approximately 18 surviving cobblestone buildings in Seneca County.

It was listed on the National Register of Historic Places on September 28, 2007.

== See also ==
- Cobblestone Farmhouse at 1229 Birdsey Road
- Cobblestone Farmhouse at 1111 Stone Church Road
- John Graves Cobblestone Farmhouse
