= Cobblestone House (Eau Claire, Wisconsin) =

Historic house in Wisconsin, United States

- U.S. National Register of Historic Places
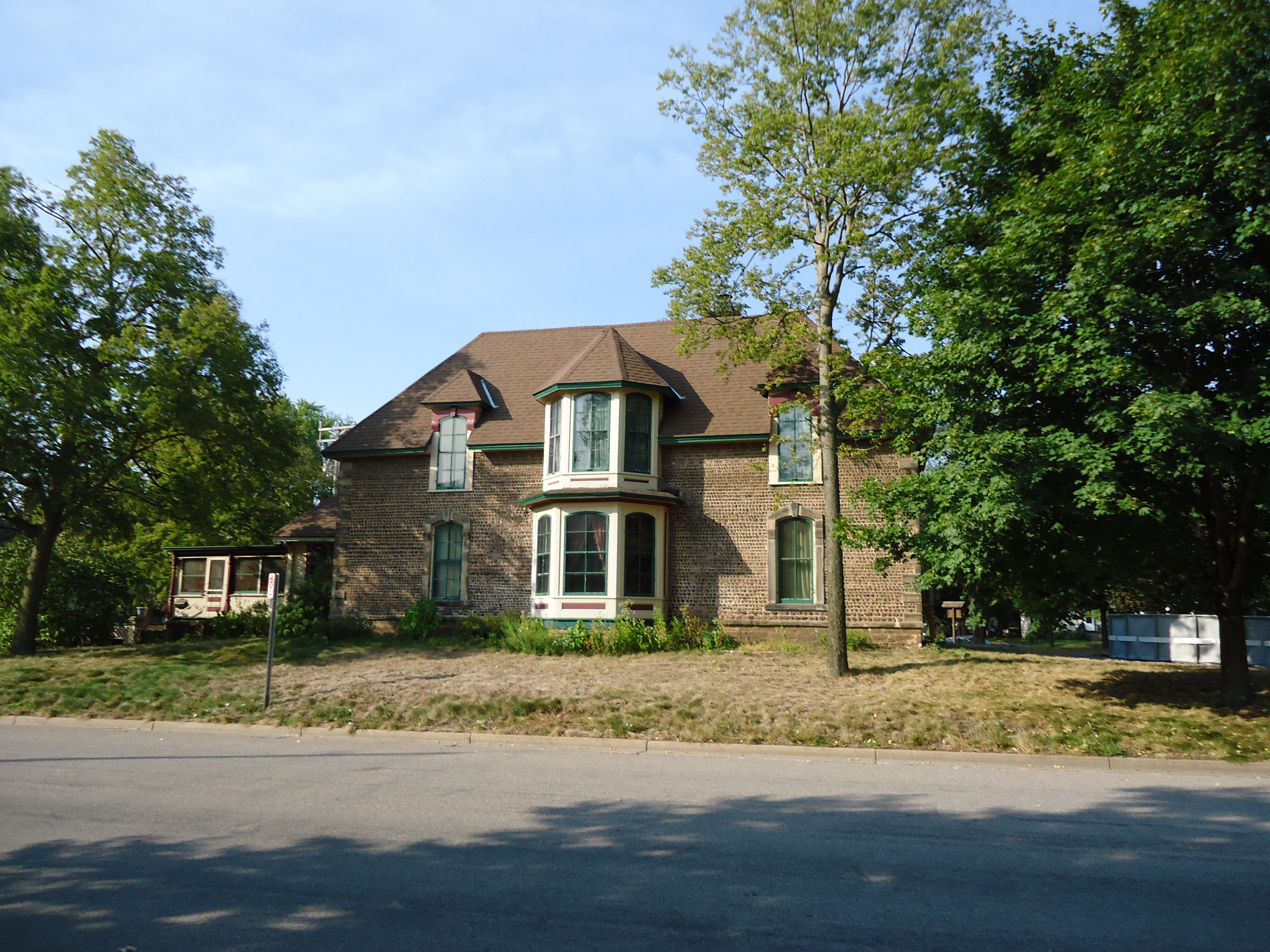

- Location within Wisconsin Location within the United States
- Location: 1011 State St., Eau Claire, Wisconsin
- Coordinates: 44°48′18″N 91°29′38″W
- Area: less than one acre
- Built: 1866
- Architect: Marcy, Bradley C.
- Architectural style: Gothic
- NRHP reference No.: 74000084
- Added to NRHP: November 19, 1974

The Cobblestone House in Eau Claire, Wisconsin is a Gothic Revival style house that was built in 1866. It reflects cobblestone architecture brought by settlers from upstate New York. It has also been known as Bradley H. Marcy House. It was listed on the National Register of Historic Places in 1974; the listing included one contributing building and one other contributing structure.

It is the only cobblestone house known to exist in northwestern Wisconsin. It is also unusual for its Gothic Revival style, instead of Greek Revival style that is far more common for cobblestone buildings.
