= John Graves Cobblestone Farmhouse =

Historic house in New York, United States

- U.S. National Register of Historic Places
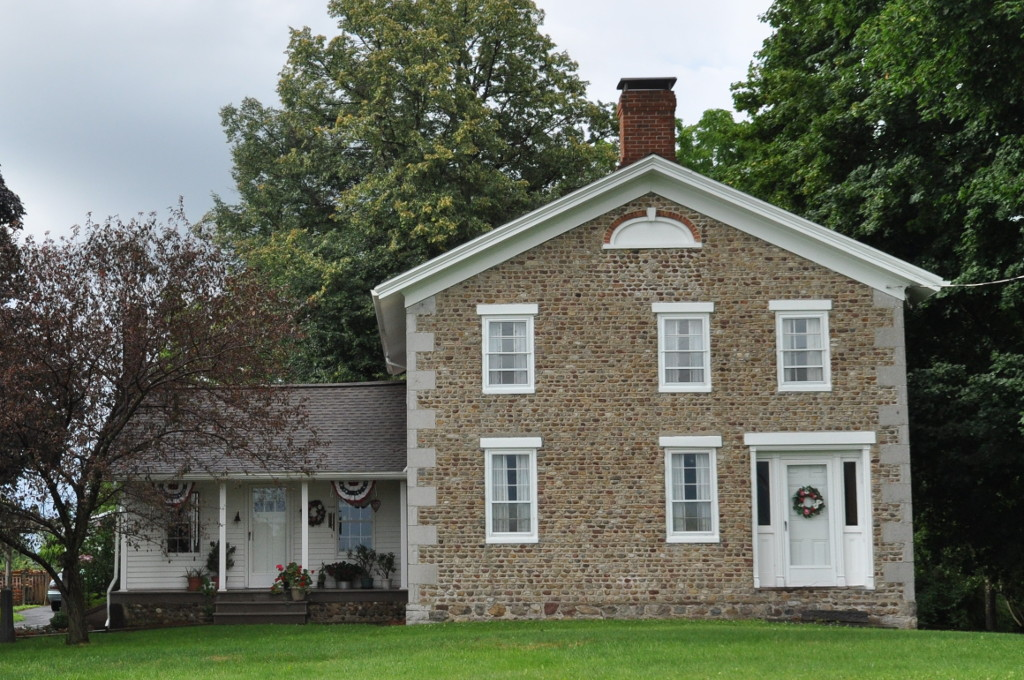

- Location within New York Location within the United States
- Location: 1370 NY 318, Junius, New York
- Coordinates: 42.95958°N 76.8737°W
- Area: 68.5 acres (27.7 ha)
- Built: 1837
- Architectural style: Federal
- MPS: Cobblestone Architecture of New York State MPS
- NRHP reference No.: 08000107
- Added to NRHP: February 28, 2008

John Graves Cobblestone Farmhouse is an American historic home located at Junius in Seneca County, New York. It is a late Federal style, two-story, three-bay wide side hall structure, with a one-story frame wing. It was built about 1837 and is constructed of irregularly sized and variously colored field cobbles. The house is among the approximately 18 surviving cobblestone buildings in Seneca County.

It was listed on the National Register of Historic Places in 2008.

== See also ==
- Cobblestone Farmhouse at 1229 Birdsey Road
- Cobblestone Farmhouse at 1027 Stone Church Road
- Cobblestone Farmhouse at 1111 Stone Church Road
