= Tuttle Creek Ashram =

Historic building in California

- Location within California Tuttle Creek Ashram (the United States)
- Alternative names: Ajna Ashrama; The Ashrama; The Monastery; The Stone House

General information
- Location: Inyo County, California
- Coordinates: 36.5491°N 118.1938°W
- Elevation: 7,600 ft (2,300 m)
- Year built: 1939-1951
- Owner: United States Forest Service

Technical details
- Material: Stone and concrete
- Floor area: 2,000 ft (610 m)

The Tuttle Creek Ashram is a historic building from 1939. It is located in the Sierra Nevada, in Inyo County, California. The building is on a cliff between two forks of Tuttle Creek. It is associated with the philosopher Franklin Merrell-Wolff.

It was originally called the Ajna Ashrama, but Merrell-Wolff's modern students refer to it simply as The Ashrama. Locals gave it the name The Monastery and some hiking guides call it The Stone House. Its more widely used name, Tuttle Creek Ashram, was given to it by the United States Forest Service.

== History ==
In 1929, Franklin Merrell-Wolff and his wife Sherifa visited Mount Whitney. Their Native American friend told them that the spiritual center of the country was near its highest point, and Alaska was not considered a state yet. Because of this, they decided to work on writing projects near the mountain. They set up their camp near one of Lone Pine Creek's waterfalls and wrote for two months.

The Merrell-Wolffs decided to use the camping area as a summer school for their organization, the Assembly of Man, which they had recently created. Merrell-Wolff asked the United States Forest Service for a special use permit and was told that a permanent structure would have to be created. He was also informed that the permits for Whitney Portal (then Hunter Flat) were not available. However, Merrell-Wolff was able to discover Tuttle Creek Canyon as a suitable spot for the camp.

The Assembly of Man and the Merrell-Wolffs were able to secure their permit in 1930, but construction did not start until 1939 because leveling the site took time. Merrell-Wolff was inspired to use stone in the structure when the dynamite he used left plentiful amounts over. It was nearly finished, but Sherifa, the main leader of the project, became unable to reach the site, so construction was paused in 1951 before windows and doors were installed.

In 1964, the Wilderness Act was passed, incorporating the building into the John Muir Wilderness, changing some rules relating to the legality of buildings in wilderness areas. Since they were usually not permitted, the U.S. Forest Service thought about destroying the structure entirely. The building was evaluated in the early 1980s for historical significance and passed, saving the ashram.

== Features ==
The building is built in the shape of a cross with equal side lengths. It measures 2,000 ft (610 m) and is made from stone and concrete. It has a beamed roof and a large fireplace. There is also a large altar patterned with granite in mortar.

In the 1960s, a visitor chiseled "Father, Into thy eternal wisdom, all creative love, and infinite power I direct my thoughts, give my devotion and manifest my energy that I may know, love, and serve thee." into the rock face. South of the altar is a 32 in (81 cm) square hole, called the "cornerstone". It was the place a person addressing the congregation was supposed to stand.
