= Ackley, Iowa =

City in Franklin and Hardin Counties, Iowa

- City
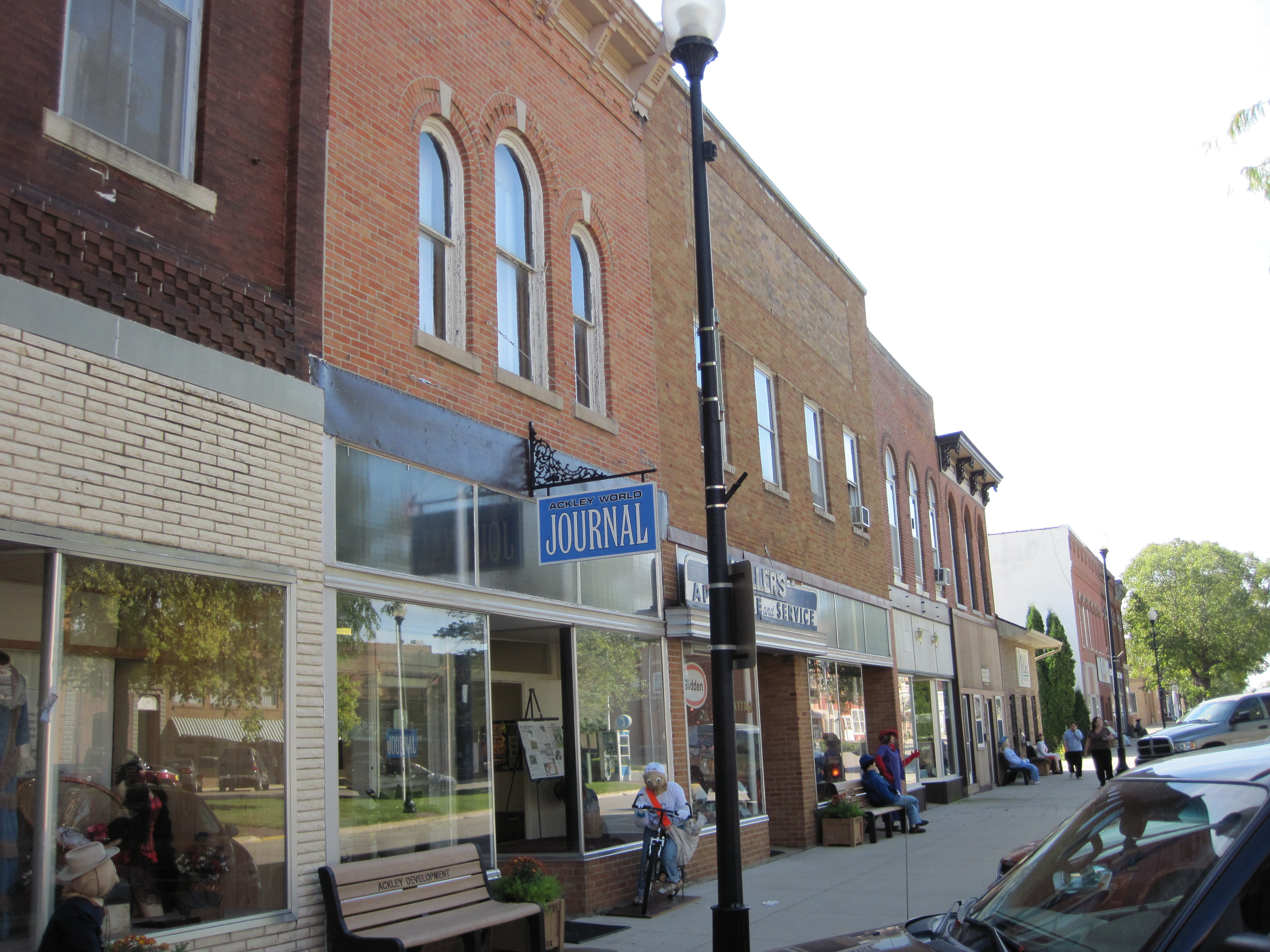
- Street scene in Ackley (2009)
- Motto: Values from the past, Vision for the future.
- Location within Hardin County and Iowa
- Coordinates: 42°33′7″N 93°3′10″W
- Country: United States
- State: Iowa
- Counties: Hardin, Franklin
- Founded: 1852

Area
  - Total: 2.49 sq mi (6.45 km^{2})
  - Land: 2.46 sq mi (6.36 km^{2})
  - Water: 0.035 sq mi (0.09 km^{2}) 1.21%
- Elevation: 1,083 ft (330 m)

Population (2020)
  - Total: 1,599
  - Density: 651/sq mi (251/km^{2})
- Time zone: UTC−6 (CST)
  - Summer (DST): UTC−5 (CDT)
- ZIP Code: 50601
- Area code: 641
- FIPS code: 19-00190
- GNIS ID: 2393877
- Website: ackleyiowa.net

Ackley is a city in both Franklin and Hardin counties in the U.S. state of Iowa. The population was 1,599 at the 2020 census.

== History ==
In 1852, immigrants began purchasing farms and settling in the north Hardin County area. In the fall of 1852, Lemuel Harvy "Seth" Arledge, a frontiersman who acted as both a physician and preacher originally from Kentucky staked a claim just north of the Hardin County line and built a cabin close to where Highway 57 now passes. Another settler, Thomas Downs, became the first permanent resident of Ackley when he bought Dr. Arledge's claim. Later his widow sold a strip of land from Butler Street to the four county corner for $3.00 an acre to Minor Gallop. Gallop built a house, just east of Highway 57 which became an inn, a stopover for stagecoaches, and the first post office.

Many caravans arrived in anticipation of settling in this area. Roby Parriott and wife, Abigail, settled in Washington Township, Butler County. Parriott immediately began to acquire more land and purchased what is now the business section of Ackley.

Mills were built on the Iowa River south of the community and in 1856 a stage line was built from Cedar Falls to Fort Dodge. The Dubuque and Pacific Railroad Company received a charter from the State of Iowa in the 1850s to build a railroad. Surveying teams were sent out. One of the members was J. William Ackley. He decided Etna Township was a good place for a railroad station. The land was owned by Parriott and his wife, who had purchased it for speculation.

William Ackley purchased the land for the railroad route and discussed founding a town. He and three other land developers purchased the land which is now the town itself for $25.00 an acre. They then sold sites for developing the town. In 1857, the town of Ackley was staked out. The plan was signed December 12, 1857. Even though Ackley never lived here, he gave the town his name.

In 1865, the Dubuque and Sioux City Railroad bought nearly all the timber at Island Grove and corded it up where the Illinois Central depot stands. By October, when the railroad reached Ackley, there were 10 business establishments and several homes. The completion of the railroad brought on a rush of settlers and businessmen and the town boomed.

The Fontaine post office was moved to Ackley and its name was changed. The town of Ackley was incorporated and William A. Francis became the first mayor. The Ackley Civic Center now stands at the site of a store once owned by Francis. As Ackley expanded more buildings were being constructed in the business area. A brick, six-room school was built at State and Second Street for $14,000. Catholics, Methodists and Presbyterians built frame churches. The population soared to 500.

The town was incorporated on August 28, 1869. By 1870, the town had a brick schoolhouse, five churches, a mayor and council, a newspaper, and many stores. In the next thirty years the town replaced the frame buildings on Main Street with brick structures, built a waterworks, established a light plant, and built hotels. The population at that time was approximately 2,000.

In the 1870s, Ackley acquired businesses such as a hardware store, furniture store, harness shop, boots and shoe store, general merchandise, jewelry and a brewery. The Ackley Independent Newspaper as well as lawyers, a doctor and fraternal organizations became part of the town.

The Hook and Ladder fire department was organized in the 1880s. The Goettels and the C.H. Doepke buildings appeared on the landscape in the 1880s. C. H. Doepke also built a home at 2nd Ave and Grundy St. A four-year high school opened with an enrollment of 40 students. The Iowa state constitution was amended in 1882, making the production and sale of alcoholic beverages illegal within the state (i.e. Iowa became a “dry state.”) The Supreme Court declared the amendment unconstitutional in 1883, but the Iowa legislature then passed another very strict prohibition law. Due to this, the Ackley brewery closed.

In 1885, the local school district went before the Supreme Court in Ackley School Dist. v. Hall over a bond dispute.

The streets were lit with oil lamps by the late 19th century. Seven students graduated from the high school in the 1890s. Plans for the Ackley Hotel were developed in the last decade of the 19th century. The project was financed by selling shares for $25 to $1000 a share. The hotel was built on the corner of State and Railroad Street (Park). During the 1890s, water mains and sewer drains were laid. Electric lights and telephone service also appeared in Ackley.

The first rural mail route was established in 1900. The first Sauerkraut Days celebration was held September 17, 1903. A high school building was erected on the northeast corner of the playground. The wooden water tower was replaced with a steel tower at Main and Cerro Gordo Streets.

There was much excitement over the coming of the automobile. A local mechanic constructed a horseless carriage in 1905 which ran to Spencer and back but was not further promoted. Ackley did pave its main streets by 1915 and many auto dealers started business.

Marshall Canning Plant and husking shed was built in 1918 and canning began in 1919. The "Glacier Trail" (the road now designated as "County S-56") was marked through Ackley in 1922. More streets were paved. In 1927, a new school was built to house 12 grades. Ackley participated in athletic sports, music and academic activities with surrounding schools. A food processing company was established.

The 1930s brought the Great Depression and 3 banks in Ackley closed. The Municipal Building was erected in 1939. The mayor and town council, fire department, police station, library and a large meeting room were housed in the building.

School buses started running in 1946. City mail delivery was inaugurated in 1947. In 1948, the Ackley Golf Club was designed and the club house was built. In 1954, twenty-two rural school districts joined with Ackley to form the Ackley Community School. Ackley celebrated its Centennial in 1957. Ackley has drawn positive publicity to the community through the frequent stops by RAGBRAI and a new Country Club.

== Geography ==
According to the United States Census Bureau, the city has a total area of 2.48 square miles (6.42 km^{2}), of which 2.45 square miles (6.35 km^{2}) is land and 0.03 square miles (0.08 km^{2}) is water.

== Demographics ==
Historical population
| Year | Pop. | ±% |
|---|---|---|
| 1880 | 1,517 | — |
| 1890 | 1,286 | −15.2% |
| 1900 | 1,445 | +12.4% |
| 1910 | 1,244 | −13.9% |
| 1920 | 1,529 | +22.9% |
| 1930 | 1,524 | −0.3% |
| 1940 | 1,586 | +4.1% |
| 1950 | 1,608 | +1.4% |
| 1960 | 1,731 | +7.6% |
| 1970 | 1,794 | +3.6% |
| 1980 | 1,900 | +5.9% |
| 1990 | 1,696 | −10.7% |
| 2000 | 1,809 | +6.7% |
| 2010 | 1,589 | −12.2% |
| 2020 | 1,599 | +0.6% |
Total Population for Iowa's Incorporated Places: 1850-2000; Source: U.S. Decennial Census

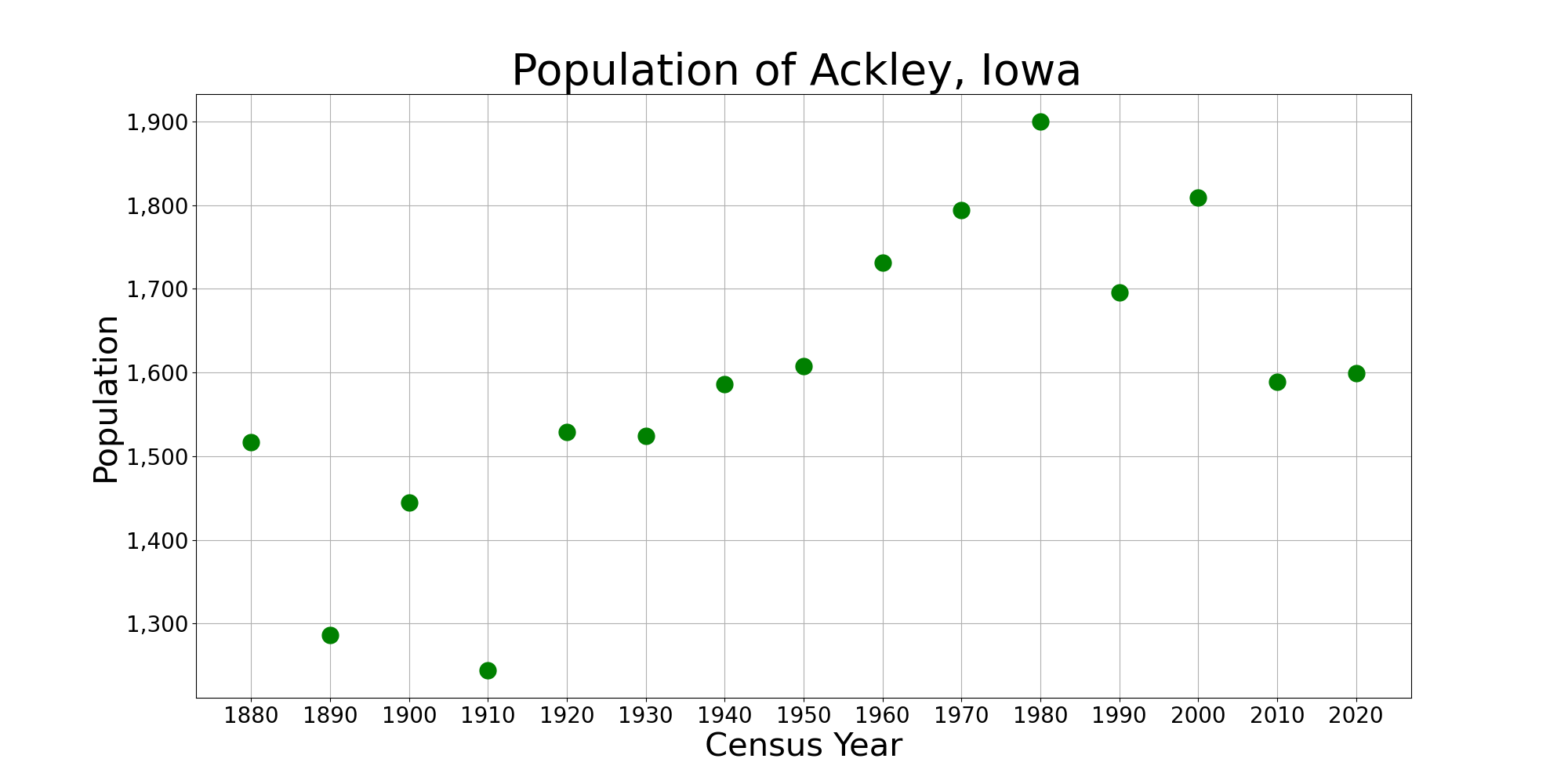
The population of Ackley, Iowa from US census data

=== 2020 census ===
As of the 2020 census, Ackley had a population of 1,599. The median age was 46.5 years. 21.5% of residents were under the age of 18 and 27.1% of residents were 65 years of age or older. For every 100 females there were 98.6 males, and for every 100 females age 18 and over there were 95.5 males age 18 and over.

0.0% of residents lived in urban areas, while 100.0% lived in rural areas.

There were 695 households in Ackley, of which 25.8% had children under the age of 18 living in them. Of all households, 48.8% were married-couple households, 17.8% were households with a male householder and no spouse or partner present, and 26.9% were households with a female householder and no spouse or partner present. About 34.1% of all households were made up of individuals and 19.5% had someone living alone who was 65 years of age or older.

There were 785 housing units, of which 11.5% were vacant. The homeowner vacancy rate was 2.1% and the rental vacancy rate was 11.2%.

Racial composition as of the 2020 census
| Race | Number | Percent |
|---|---|---|
| White | 1,430 | 89.4% |
| Black or African American | 4 | 0.3% |
| American Indian and Alaska Native | 0 | 0.0% |
| Asian | 7 | 0.4% |
| Native Hawaiian and Other Pacific Islander | 0 | 0.0% |
| Some other race | 97 | 6.1% |
| Two or more races | 61 | 3.8% |
| Hispanic or Latino (of any race) | 159 | 9.9% |

=== 2010 census ===
As of the census of 2010, there were 1,589 people, 699 households, and 447 families residing in the city. The population density was 648.6 inhabitants per square mile (250.4/km^{2}). There were 789 housing units at an average density of 322.0 per square mile (124.3/km^{2}). The racial makeup was 94.8% White, 0.1% African American, 0.1% Native American, 4.0% from other races, and 1.0% from two or more races. Hispanic or Latino of any race were 8.8% of the population.

There were 699 households, of which 24.7% had children under the age of 18 living with them, 52.1% were married couples living together, 9.3% had a female householder with no husband present, 2.6% had a male householder with no wife present, and 36.1% were non-families. 33.5% of all households were made up of individuals, and 18.2% had someone living alone who was 65 years of age or older. The average household size was 2.18 and the average family size was 2.71.

The median age was 48.9 years. 20.3% of residents were under the age of 18; 5.7% were between the ages of 18 and 24; 17.6% were from 25 to 44; 26.9% were from 45 to 64; and 29.5% were 65 years of age or older. The gender makeup was 47.1% male and 52.9% female.

=== 2000 census ===
As of the census of 2000, there were 1,809 people, 734 households, and 482 families residing in the city. The population density was 737.8 inhabitants per square mile (284.9/km^{2}). There were 817 housing units at an average density of 333.2 per square mile (128.6/km^{2}). The racial makeup was 93.75% White, 0.17% African American, 0.28% Asian, 0.06% Pacific Islander, 4.48% from other races, and 1.27% from two or more races. Hispanic or Latino of any race were 8.24% of the population.

There were 734 households, out of which 29.0% had children under the age of 18 living with them, 55.6% were married couples living together, 7.5% had a female householder with no husband present, and 34.2% were non-families. 32.3% of all households were made up of individuals, and 18.8% had someone living alone who was 65 years of age or older. The average household size was 2.32 and the average family size was 2.94.

23.4% are under the age of 18, 6.0% from 18 to 24, 22.4% from 25 to 44, 21.8% from 45 to 64, and 26.5% are 65 years of age or older. The median age was 44 years. For every 100 females, there were 85.3 males. For every 100 females age 18 and over, there were 80.9 males.

The median income for a household was $36,250, and the median income for a family was $44,200. Males had a median income of $30,428 versus $21,607 for females. The per capita income was $17,406. About 5.8% of families and 8.3% of the population were below the poverty line, including 11.9% of those under age 18 and 2.8% of those age 65 or over.

== Education ==
AGWSR Community School District operates area public schools. The district formed on July 1, 2001, with the merger of the Wellsburg-Steamboat Rock Community School District and the Ackley–Geneva Community School District.

== Notable people ==
- Art Reinhart, MLB pitcher
