= Ackley–Geneva Community School District =

Defunct school district in Iowa, United States

Location
- Ackley, Iowa; United States

District information
- Closed: July 1, 2001 (replaced by AGWSR Community School District)

Ackley–Geneva Community School District was a school district headquartered in Ackley, Iowa, serving both Ackley and Geneva, Iowa.

On July 1, 2001, it merged with the Wellsburg-Steamboat Rock Community School District to form the AGWSR Community School District.
