= List of United States tornadoes from August to October 2017 =

This page documents all tornadoes confirmed by various weather forecast offices of the National Weather Service in the United States from August to October 2017.

== United States yearly total ==
Confirmed tornadoes by Enhanced Fujita rating
EFU	EF0	EF1	EF2	EF3	EF4	EF5	Total
67	618	592*	128	13	2	0	1,420

- Note: An EF2 tornado from Canada crossed into the United States, where that portion of the track was rated EF1.

== August ==
Confirmed tornadoes by Enhanced Fujita rating
EFU	EF0	EF1	EF2	EF3	EF4	EF5	Total
1	75	34	6	0	0	0	116

=== August 2 event ===
List of confirmed tornadoes – Wednesday, August 2, 2017 (Note: All dates are based on the local time zone where the tornado touched down; however, all times are in Coordinated Universal Time for consistency.)
EF#	Location	County / Parish	State	Start Coord.	Time (UTC)	Path length	Max width
EF0	Rend Lake	Jefferson	IL	38.15°N 88.9368°W	23:27–23:29	0.5 mi (0.80 km)	40 yd (37 m)
EF0	A waterspout was photographed.						

=== August 3 event ===
List of confirmed tornadoes – Thursday, August 3, 2017
EF#	Location	County / Parish	State	Start Coord.	Time (UTC)	Path length	Max width
EF0	Kewadin	Antrim	MI	44.9285°N 85.3808°W	22:10–22:11	0.09 mi (0.14 km)	55 yd (50 m)
EF0	A few homes and outbuildings sustained minor damage.						
EF0	Lake Winnibigoshish (1st tornado)	Cass	MN	47.4506°N 94.2105°W	23:04–22:15	0.34 mi (0.55 km)	20 yd (18 m)
EF0	The public documented three simultaneous waterspouts.						
EF0	Lake Winnibigoshish (2nd tornado)	Cass	MN	47.4341°N 94.2526°W	23:04–22:15	0.2 mi (0.32 km)	10 yd (9.1 m)
EF0	The public documented three simultaneous waterspouts.						
EF0	Lake Winnibigoshish (3rd tornado)	Cass	MN	47.3999°N 94.2862°W	23:10–22:15	0.1 mi (0.16 km)	20 yd (18 m)
EF0	The public documented three simultaneous waterspouts.						
EF0	South Phoenix	Maricopa	AZ	33.41°N 112.07°W	00:05–00:10	0.25 mi (0.40 km)	100 yd (91 m)
EF0	A brief landspout tornado was documented.						

=== August 4 event ===
List of confirmed tornadoes – Friday, August 4, 2017
EF#	Location	County / Parish	State	Start Coord.	Time (UTC)	Path length	Max width
EFU	Great Sacandaga Lake	Saratoga	NY	43.17°N 74.11°W	18:50–18:51	0.05 mi (0.080 km)	20 yd (18 m)
EFU	Video via Facebook documented a tornado over the Great Sacandaga Lake.						
EF1	N of Needmore	Fulton	PA	39.8548°N 78.15°W	21:55–22:01	1.22 mi (1.96 km)	200 yd (180 m)
EF1	Approximately 150 trees were snapped or uprooted.						
EF1	S of Macon	Bibb	GA	32.7145°N 83.6986°W	23:46–23:50	1.86 mi (2.99 km)	200 yd (180 m)
EF1	A home sustained significant roof damage, an outbuilding was removed from its foundation and destroyed, and many trees were snapped or uprooted. A barn and an outbuilding also sustained roof damage, and a sunflower field was damaged.						

=== August 5 event ===
List of confirmed tornadoes – Saturday, August 5, 2017
EF#	Location	County / Parish	State	Start Coord.	Time (UTC)	Path length	Max width
EF1	NE of Millinocket	Penobscot	ME	45.69°N 68.69°W	02:47–02:59	2.53 mi (4.07 km)	33 yd (30 m)
EF1	Over 1,000 trees were snapped or downed in a convergent pattern.						
EF1	Sherman	Aroostook	ME	45.91°N 68.36°W	03:30–03:31	0.48 mi (0.77 km)	20 yd (18 m)
EF1	A large section of a roof was ripped off one barn, and a second barn partially damaged. A chicken coop was destroyed, and a residence sustained significant shingle damage. A few trees were uprooted.						

=== August 6 event ===
List of confirmed tornadoes – Sunday, August 6, 2017
EF#	Location	County / parish	State	Start Coord.	Time (UTC)	Path length	Max width	Summary
EF2	Southeastern Tulsa to N of Broken Arrow	Tulsa	OK	36.1097°N 95.9367°W	06:19–06:25	6.9 mi (11.1 km)	550 yd (500 m)	See section on this tornado – 30 people were injured and losses totaled $50 million.
EF1	N of Broken Arrow	Tulsa, Wagoner	OK	36.0919°N 95.7936°W	06:27–06:31	2.9 mi (4.7 km)	400 yd (370 m)	Numerous homes sustained roof damage, and numerous large trees were snapped or uprooted. The roof of an outbuilding was blown off.
EF1	E of Oologah	Rogers	OK	36.4443°N 95.6908°W	06:32–06:40	4.5 mi (7.2 km)	200 yd (180 m)	Barns, trees, and a home were damaged. Power poles were snapped.
EF1	S of Chelsea	Rogers, Mayes	OK	36.4496°N 95.4409°W	07:11–07:13	0.9 mi (1.4 km)	400 yd (370 m)	An agricultural building sustained minor roof damage.

=== August 7 event ===
List of confirmed tornadoes – Monday, August 7, 2017
EF#	Location	County / Parish	State	Start Coord.	Time (UTC)	Path length	Max width
EF1	Salisbury	Wicomico	MD	38.3408°N 75.6066°W	17:40–17:41	1.47 mi (2.37 km)	150 yd (140 m)
EF1	Several businesses were damaged near Salisbury University. Cars in the parking lot of a strip mall were tossed, and structures nearby sustained minor damage. A concrete block building collapsed when its bay doors were left open.						
EF0	Weems to Irvington	Lancaster	VA	37.6571°N 76.45°W	18:51–18:55	2.09 mi (3.36 km)	50 yd (46 m)
EF0	A couple of homes lost some of their siding and shingles. Trees were blown down.						
EF0	S of Champion	Chase	NE	40.43°N 101.75°W	22:22	0.1 mi (0.16 km)	10 yd (9.1 m)
EF0	A trained storm spotter reported a brief landspout tornado.						

=== August 9 event ===
List of confirmed tornadoes – Wednesday, August 9, 2017
EF#	Location	County / Parish	State	Start Coord.	Time (UTC)	Path length	Max width
EF0	SE of Wagon Mound	Mora	NM	35.8595°N 104.6608°W	23:50–23:51	0.33 mi (0.53 km)	50 yd (46 m)
EF0	A KRQE viewer submitted a picture of a small tornado.						

=== August 11 event ===
List of confirmed tornadoes – Friday, August 11, 2017
EF#	Location	County / Parish	State	Start Coord.	Time (UTC)	Path length	Max width
EF0	ENE of Key West	Monroe	FL	24.5688°N 81.7339°W	21:03–21:05	0.22 mi (0.35 km)	25 yd (23 m)
EF0	A metal tube roof structure was flipped airborne, a boat tarp was lifted, and a folding tent structure was tossed. A boat covering frame was removed and tossed, and numerous small limbs were snapped.						
EF0	Broad Run	Fauquier	VA	38.8222°N 77.7330°W	22:08–22:10	1.38 mi (2.22 km)	100 yd (91 m)
EF0	Numerous trees were snapped or uprooted, some of which fell on power lines and homes.						

=== August 12 event ===
List of confirmed tornadoes – Saturday, August 12, 2017
EF#	Location	County / Parish	State	Start Coord.	Time (UTC)	Path length	Max width
EF1	McAlisterville	Juniata	PA	40.6462°N 77.2744°W	19:12–19:20	5.53 mi (8.90 km)	200 yd (180 m)
EF1	A tractor trailer was flipped, homes and sheds were damaged, and a long swath of trees was snapped and uprooted. The roof was also lifted off of its base at the Juniata Mennonite School.						
EF0	ENE of Anton	Washington	CO	39.78°N 103.15°W	23:10	0.01 mi (0.016 km)	25 yd (23 m)
EF0	A trained storm spotter reported a tornado over open country.						
EF0	S of Akron	Washington	CO	39.7°N 103.15°W	23:27–23:30	0.01 mi (0.016 km)	25 yd (23 m)
EF0	The public reported a tornado over open country.						
EF0	Anton	Washington	CO	39.75°N 103.22°W	23:30	0.01 mi (0.016 km)	25 yd (23 m)
EF0	The public reported a tornado over open country.						
EF0	SE of Anton	Washington	CO	39.68°N 103.13°W	23:45	0.01 mi (0.016 km)	25 yd (23 m)
EF0	The public reported a tornado over open country.						

=== August 13 event ===
List of confirmed tornadoes – Sunday, August 13, 2017
EF#	Location	County / Parish	State	Start Coord.	Time (UTC)	Path length	Max width
EF0	NNE of Amarillo	Potter	TX	35.32°N 101.71°W	01:00–01:01	0.09 mi (0.14 km)	20 yd (18 m)
EF0	A storm chaser observed a tornado.						

=== August 15 event ===
List of confirmed tornadoes – Tuesday, August 15, 2017
EF#	Location	County / Parish	State	Start Coord.	Time (UTC)	Path length	Max width
EF0	N of Potter	Cheyenne	NE	41.33°N 103.31°W	00:10–00:25	6.78 mi (10.91 km)	50 yd (46 m)
EF0	Broadcast media documented a tornado over open country.						

=== August 16 event ===
List of confirmed tornadoes – Wednesday, August 16, 2017
EF#	Location	County / Parish	State	Start Coord.	Time (UTC)	Path length	Max width
EF0	S of Nicollet	Nicollet	MN	44.2279°N 94.1762°W	21:46–21:52	3.87 mi (6.23 km)	75 yd (69 m)
EF0	A garage was damaged on a farmstead. Trees were damaged.						
EF0	S of Nicollet	Nicollet	MN	44.244°N 94.1705°W	22:03–22:09	1.94 mi (3.12 km)	25 yd (23 m)
EF0	Crops and trees were damaged.						
EF0	E of New Sweden	Nicollet	MN	44.3939°N 94.1851°W	22:32–22:34	1.27 mi (2.04 km)	20 yd (18 m)
EF0	High-resolution satellite imagery confirmed a tornado that damaged corn fields.						
EF1	S of Gaylord	Nicollet, Sibley	MN	44.4065°N 94.1975°W	22:33–22:48	5.22 mi (8.40 km)	75 yd (69 m)
EF1	A multi-vortex tornado struck a farmstead, causing significant damage to trees and outbuildings.						
EF0	SW of Gaylord	Sibley	MN	44.5377°N 94.2398°W	23:15–23:19	1.37 mi (2.20 km)	60 yd (55 m)
EF0	Video and spotter reports indicated a weak tornado crossed a road.						
EF0	ENE of Winthrop	Sibley	MN	44.5654°N 94.2676°W	23:26–23:33	4.08 mi (6.57 km)	75 yd (69 m)
EF0	Corn was flattened; a tree was uprooted and others were damaged. A structurally-compromised barn was destroyed.						
EF0	New Prague	Le Sueur, Scott	MN	44.5359°N 93.5852°W	00:05–00:11	1.26 mi (2.03 km)	10 yd (9.1 m)
EF0	Minor damage to trees was noted.						
EF0	SW of Stewart	Sibley	MN	44.694°N 94.5097°W	00:21–00:22	0.61 mi (0.98 km)	25 yd (23 m)
EF0	A storm chaser videoed a tornado.						
EF1	W of Freeport	Stephenson	IL	42.2741°N 89.7316°W	00:21–00:28	2.79 mi (4.49 km)	75 yd (69 m)
EF1	Numerous trees were damaged. Two homes suffered minor damage.						
EF1	WNW of Elizabeth	Jo Daviess	IL	42.3414°N 90.3187°W	00:22–00:24	0.54 mi (0.87 km)	60 yd (55 m)
EF1	Large walnut trees were snapped and uprooted.						
EF0	WNW of Freeport	Stephenson	IL	42.3222°N 89.7119°W	00:28–00:38	3.25 mi (5.23 km)	20 yd (18 m)
EF0	Trees were damaged.						
EF0	NW of Prior Lake	Scott	MN	44.7246°N 93.4707°W	00:46–00:49	1.2 mi (1.9 km)	75 yd (69 m)
EF0	Fencing and tents were downed, trees were uprooted, and a fish house was rotated.						
EF0	NW of Biscay	McLeod	MN	44.8517°N 94.3090°W	01:05–01:07	0.77 mi (1.24 km)	50 yd (46 m)
EF0	Corn was damaged.						
EF0	Southern Lester Prairie	McLeod	MN	44.8802°N 94.0465°W	01:08–01:09	0.05 mi (0.080 km)	30 yd (27 m)
EF0	Some trees were uprooted and tree limbs were broken in the southern part of town.						

=== August 17 event ===
List of confirmed tornadoes – Thursday, August 17, 2017
EF#	Location	County / Parish	State	Start Coord.	Time (UTC)	Path length	Max width
EF1	ESE of Cortland	Trumbull	OH	41.3121°N 80.6561°W	23:11–23:19	1.04 mi (1.67 km)	100 yd (91 m)
EF1	Over 100 trees were snapped and uprooted. A mobile home was moved, with several pieces of aluminum siding and insulation displaced.						
EF0	SE of Lupton	Ogemaw	MI	44.4016°N 83.9742°W	23:34–23:35	0.26 mi (0.42 km)	75 yd (69 m)
EF0	A few houses, an outbuilding, and several boats and docks were damaged.						
EF0	SE of Kingston	Tuscola	MI	43.391°N 83.146°W	01:10–01:17	3.07 mi (4.94 km)	100 yd (91 m)
EF0	Sporadic tree and crop damage was observed, as well as the removal of roofing material from an outbuilding.						

=== August 18 event ===
List of confirmed tornadoes – Friday, August 18, 2017
EF#	Location	County / Parish	State	Start Coord.	Time (UTC)	Path length	Max width
EF0	SW of Fellsmere	Indian River	FL	27.715°N 80.6857°W	21:40–21:43	0.18 mi (0.29 km)	20 yd (18 m)
EF0	A sheriff's deputy observed a landspout tornado.						
EF0	SW of Rockledge	Brevard	FL	28.3162°N 80.7468°W	22:29–22:30	0.36 mi (0.58 km)	15 yd (14 m)
EF0	A home's roof was peeled back from an overhanging and partially removed. Minor damage occurred to a screen porch, a carport, trees, and fences.						
EF1	NW of Rushmore	Nobles	MN	43.65°N 95.84°W	00:26–00:35	3.03 mi (4.88 km)	100 yd (91 m)
EF1	Crops were damaged, and a hog farm sustained damage, killing 20 to 30 hogs inside.						
EF1	WNW of Rushmore	Nobles	MN	43.63°N 95.82°W	00:37–00:43	1.34 mi (2.16 km)	100 yd (91 m)
EF1	Crops were damaged.						
EF1	Bigelow	Nobles, Osceola	MN, IA	43.5014°N 95.7401°W	00:47–00:54	1.63 mi (2.62 km)	100 yd (91 m)
EF1	Crops were damaged, a grain bin was rolled, and a garage was destroyed.						
EF2	NW of Melvin	Osceola	IA	43.34°N 95.68°W	01:07–01:27	5.14 mi (8.27 km)	250 yd (230 m)
EF2	Large trees were snapped or uprooted, corn was flattened, and farm buildings were damaged or destroyed. A pickup truck was overturned, and up to 30 head of cattle were missing after the tornado.						
EF0	ESE of Larrabee	Cherokee	IA	42.85°N 95.49°W	02:21–02:25	0.81 mi (1.30 km)	50 yd (46 m)
EF0	Trees and crops sustained minor damage.						

=== August 19 event ===
List of confirmed tornadoes – Saturday, August 19, 2017
EF#	Location	County / Parish	State	Start Coord.	Time (UTC)	Path length	Max width
EF0	NW of Almeria	Loup	NE	41.93°N 99.66°W	00:40	0.1 mi (0.16 km)	10 yd (9.1 m)
EF0	A debris signature was evident on radar.						
EF1	NW of Almeria	Loup	NE	41.87°N 99.6°W	00:48–00:50	2.3 mi (3.7 km)	840 yd (770 m)
EF1	Wooden power poles were snapped, trees were damaged, and a large corrugated metal quonset hut was twisted and collapsed.						
EF1	NW of Almeria	Loup	NE	41.87°N 99.59°W	00:48–00:50	0.69 mi (1.11 km)	330 yd (300 m)
EF1	An outbuilding was flipped and severe tree damage was noted.						
EF0	W of Almeria	Loup	NE	41.84°N 99.59°W	01:03	0.1 mi (0.16 km)	10 yd (9.1 m)
EF0	An emergency manager reported a brief tornado.						
EF2	W of Almeria	Loup	NE	41.8294°N 99.5806°W	01:14–01:17	0.65 mi (1.05 km)	540 yd (490 m)
EF2	Numerous trees were snapped and twisted, and all outbuildings were destroyed at a farmstead. Debris from the outbuildings was scattered up to a half-mile away. A boat from this location was thrown and destroyed, with parts found in a field less than a mile away. A house sustained roof damage and sustained damage from projectiles.						

=== August 21 event ===
List of confirmed tornadoes – Monday, August 21, 2017
EF#	Location	County / Parish	State	Start Coord.	Time (UTC)	Path length	Max width
EF0	SW of Ames	Boone, Story	IA	41.949°N 93.7256°W	22:52–22:55	3.28 mi (5.28 km)	60 yd (55 m)
EF0	High-resolution satellite image indicated a tornado damaged trees.						
EF0	SE of Ames	Story	IA	41.9496°N 93.5614°W	22:58–22:59	1.08 mi (1.74 km)	10 yd (9.1 m)
EF0	High-resolution satellite image indicated a tornado damaged bean and corn fields.						

=== August 22 event ===
List of confirmed tornadoes – Tuesday, August 22, 2017
EF#	Location	County / Parish	State	Start Coord.	Time (UTC)	Path length	Max width
EF1	N of Brave	Greene	PA	39.7580°N 80.2871°W	20:23–20:25	1.5 mi (2.4 km)	250 yd (230 m)
EF1	Numerous trees were snapped at their trunks or uprooted. A home lost a majority of its roof, as well as its deck; a piece of deck became a missile that was driven into the windshield of a vehicle. A 35 lb (16 kg) battery in front of a camper was lifted and tossed 20 yards.						
EF1	NW of Georgetown	Madison	NY	42.8041°N 75.7403°W	20:55–20:56	0.15 mi (0.24 km)	30 yd (27 m)
EF1	Extensive tree damage was observed in a forest.						
EF1	NW of Brookfield	Madison	NY	42.8571°N 75.4318°W	21:25–21:26	0.43 mi (0.69 km)	150 yd (140 m)
EF1	A couple dozen trees were downed. A greenhouse had its entire roof ripped off, while two barns had portions of their roofs blown off. A home lost a few shingles.						

=== August 25 event ===
Events were associated with Hurricane Harvey.

List of confirmed tornadoes – Friday, August 25, 2017
EF#	Location	County / Parish	State	Start Coord.	Time (UTC)	Path length	Max width
EF0	NE of Galveston	Galveston	TX	29.3104°N 94.7699°W	19:18–19:19	0.12 mi (0.19 km)	20 yd (18 m)
EF0	A metal fence was damaged.						
EF0	WSW of Jones Creek	Brazoria	TX	28.9811°N 95.483°W	20:30–20:31	0.23 mi (0.37 km)	30 yd (27 m)
EF0	Numerous trees were snapped or uprooted. A barn was damaged.						
EF1	SW of Jones Creek	Matagorda	TX	28.7699°N 95.6255°W	21:08–21:14	2.18 mi (3.51 km)	50 yd (46 m)
EF1	A home sustained significant damage, a motor home was overturned, and numerous trees were snapped or downed. Several other houses and businesses sustained minor roof damage.						
EF0	ENE of Seadrift	Calhoun	TX	28.4239°N 96.6671°W	21:14–21:15	0.16 mi (0.26 km)	20 yd (18 m)
EF0	A shed and a carport were destroyed.						
EF0	SW of Angleton	Brazoria	TX	29.1464°N 95.5448°W	23:11–23:20	3.98 mi (6.41 km)	50 yd (46 m)
EF0	Numerous trees, roofs, and outbuildings were damaged. A barn and several outbuildings were destroyed.						
EF0	SSW of Danbury	Brazoria	TX	29.2216°N 95.3505°W	03:44–03:52	4.76 mi (7.66 km)	50 yd (46 m)
EF0	A barn and several trees were damaged.						

=== August 26 event ===
Texas and Louisiana events were associated with Hurricane Harvey.

List of confirmed tornadoes – Saturday, August 26, 2017
EF#	Location	County / Parish	State	Start Coord.	Time (UTC)	Path length	Max width
EF0	W of Liverpool	Brazoria	TX	29.2987°N 95.3045°W	05:28–05:37	4.31 mi (6.94 km)	50 yd (46 m)
EF0	Four power poles and several trees were downed. Some barns and outbuildings were damaged.						
EF0	W of Iowa Colony	Brazoria, Fort Bend	TX	29.4379°N 95.45°W	05:50–05:57	1.57 mi (2.53 km)	50 yd (46 m)
EF0	Roofs and fences were damaged in a fairly new subdivision. Trees were snapped or downed.						
EF1	SW of Fresno	Fort Bend	TX	29.4873°N 95.517°W	05:56–05:59	1.46 mi (2.35 km)	100 yd (91 m)
EF1	Homes were damaged, resulting in minor injuries. A responding police deputy was blown off the road.						
EF0	S of Egypt	Wharton	TX	29.3421°N 96.25°W	07:10–07:12	1.45 mi (2.33 km)	30 yd (27 m)
EF0	A tornado debris signature was spotted on radar.						
EF0	WNW of Pecan Grove	Fort Bend	TX	29.7°N 95.76°W	07:12–07:14	0.11 mi (0.18 km)	30 yd (27 m)
EF0	A home sustained minor roof damage.						
EF0	SE of Humble	Harris	TX	29.9243°N 95.1516°W	09:30–09:32	1.02 mi (1.64 km)	30 yd (27 m)
EF0	Roof, tree, and fence damage was reported by broadcast media.						
EF1	WSW of Katy	Fort Bend, Waller	TX	29.7756°N 95.8442°W	09:57–10:00	0.4 mi (0.64 km)	50 yd (46 m)
EF1	An RV boat and storage facility sustained significant damage.						
EF0	S of College Station	Brazos	TX	30.4803°N 96.315°W	13:05–13:06	0.16 mi (0.26 km)	20 yd (18 m)
EF0	Tree damage was reported.						
EF0	SE of Hackberry	Cameron	LA	29.9692°N 93.3495°W	17:22–17:25	1.66 mi (2.67 km)	25 yd (23 m)
EF0	A travel trailer was rolled onto its side, and shingles were ripped off a home.						
EF0	SW of Oelrichs	Fall River	SD	43.0595°N 103.2956°W	21:20–21:21	0.66 mi (1.06 km)	10 yd (9.1 m)
EF0	Tree damage was observed.						
EF1	W of Jersey Village	Harris	TX	29.907°N 95.6872°W	20:50–20:57	0.94 mi (1.51 km)	50 yd (46 m)
EF1	Trees were blown over and minor roof damage was reported.						
EF0	NW of Jersey Village	Harris	TX	29.9528°N 95.6704°W	21:20–21:22	0.52 mi (0.84 km)	50 yd (46 m)
EF0	Evidence of a tornado was relayed through social media.						
EF0	NW of East Bernard	Wharton	TX	29.5438°N 96.0845°W	22:23–22:26	0.54 mi (0.87 km)	30 yd (27 m)
EF0	Trees were downed, a home was damaged, and a horse trailer was overturned.						
EF1	S of Stafford	Fort Bend	TX	29.5706°N 95.5125°W	01:15–01:23	5.78 mi (9.30 km)	100 yd (91 m)
EF1	Damage to 28 homes was reported, with some sustaining higher-end EF1 impacts.						
EF0	Samoset	Manatee	FL	27.4769°N 82.554°W	01:19–01:22	0.32 mi (0.51 km)	50 yd (46 m)
EF0	A County Public Works Facility sustained minor damage. Aluminum debris was tossed, and several trees and large limbs were downed.						

=== August 27 event ===
Events were associated with Hurricane Harvey.

List of confirmed tornadoes – Sunday, August 27, 2017
EF#	Location	County / Parish	State	Start Coord.	Time (UTC)	Path length	Max width
EF0	Webster	Harris	TX	29.55°N 95.11°W	05:00–05:02	0.03 mi (0.048 km)	30 yd (27 m)
EF0	Brief tornado heavily damaged a gas station awning.						
EF1	East Bernard	Wharton	TX	29.5246°N 96.0669°W	06:43–06:47	2.27 mi (3.65 km)	50 yd (46 m)
EF1	Several large mature oak and pecan trees were snapped. A house sustained significant brick facade damage, and four apartments were damaged in town.						
EF0	NW of Bacliff	Galveston	TX	29.5106°N 95.0057°W	09:03–09:07	0.73 mi (1.17 km)	30 yd (27 m)
EF0	Trees were downed and roofs sustained minor damage.						
EF0	ENE of West University	Harris	TX	29.717°N 95.4151°W	15:15–15:16	0.08 mi (0.13 km)	20 yd (18 m)
EF0	Windows were blown out at the Torchy's Tacos and Banana Republic.						
EF0	NNW of Erath	Vermilion	LA	29.9893°N 92.0415°W	19:15–19:17	0.21 mi (0.34 km)	25 yd (23 m)
EF0	Tin was pulled off a large barn, a travel trailer was tipped over, and a large section of a sugar cane field was blown over.						
EF0	NE of Lydia	Iberia	LA	29.9708°N 91.7559°W	19:35–19:36	0.15 mi (0.24 km)	25 yd (23 m)
EF0	A tornado was videoed in a sugar cane field.						

=== August 28 event ===
Events were associated with Hurricane Harvey.

List of confirmed tornadoes – Monday, August 28, 2017
EF#	Location	County / Parish	State	Start Coord.	Time (UTC)	Path length	Max width
EF0	W of Johnson Bayou	Cameron	LA	29.7638°N 93.71°W	09:39–09:41	0.28 mi (0.45 km)	25 yd (23 m)
EF0	A shed was flipped, trees were damaged, and a portion of roofing was ripped from a home.						

=== August 29 event ===
Events were associated with Hurricane Harvey.

List of confirmed tornadoes – Tuesday, August 29, 2017
EF#	Location	County / Parish	State	Start Coord.	Time (UTC)	Path length	Max width
EF0	SSE of Wright	Vermilion	LA	29.96°N 92.41°W	22:00–22:01	0.02 mi (0.032 km)	25 yd (23 m)
EF0	An emergency manager witnessed a tornado in an open field.						
EF2	S of Evangeline	Acadia	LA	30.2276°N 92.5776°W	22:09–22:15	2.18 mi (3.51 km)	175 yd (160 m)
EF2	Numerous trees were snapped or uprooted and a small trailer was flipped. Four homes, a pick-up truck, a motorcycle, and fencing were damaged. Of the homes damaged, two sustained roof damage, one was moved off its blocks, and one was destroyed, with a majority of its roof removed and exterior walls collapsed. Three power poles were downed.						
EF0	Ridge	Lafayette	LA	30.16°N 92.18°W	22:34–22:35	0.14 mi (0.23 km)	25 yd (23 m)
EF0	A tornado briefly touched down but caused no damage.						

=== August 30 event ===
Events were associated with Hurricane Harvey.

List of confirmed tornadoes – Wednesday, August 30, 2017
EF#	Location	County / Parish	State	Start Coord.	Time (UTC)	Path length	Max width
EF0	Biloxi	Harrison	MS	30.3962°N 88.9121°W	06:00–06:02	0.15 mi (0.24 km)	30 yd (27 m)
EF0	Minor tree damage was observed. Two homes and a vehicle were damaged.						
EF0	SW of Pascagoula	Jackson	MS	30.3431°N 88.5479°W	07:20–07:22	0.25 mi (0.40 km)	200 yd (180 m)
EF0	A waterspout moved ashore, producing light to moderate damage to trees, fences, and two homes.						
EF1	W of Purvis	Lamar	MS	31.1606°N 89.5365°W	15:04–15:07	1.71 mi (2.75 km)	100 yd (91 m)
EF1	Numerous pine trees were snapped or uprooted, and a V-based truss tower was downed. Much of the area was inaccessible due to power crews working to repair a downed transmission line. Further investigation is pending.						
EF1	Silver Run	Pearl River	MS	30.7239°N 89.3618°W	15:07–15:13	3.25 mi (5.23 km)	200 yd (180 m)
EF1	A large farmstead saw two of its barns heavily damaged. Large trees were split as well. Unusual phenomenon was observed, including a small tree limb that was wedged between a window frame and the brick wall without breaking the glass, and walnuts that were driven through airborne roofing shingles, leaving holes.						
EF0	Gulf Park Estates	Jackson	MS	30.3638°N 88.769°W	16:31–16:35	2.32 mi (3.73 km)	250 yd (230 m)
EF0	A large waterspout moved ashore, producing mainly tree damage, inflicting minor awning and shingle damage, and tossing light objects. Tin sheeting was flung into trees, and several fences were blown down.						
EF1	WNW of Petal	Forrest	MS	31.3462°N 89.2692°W	16:41–16:45	1.26 mi (2.03 km)	160 yd (150 m)
EF1	Two businesses sustained minor roof damage. Several trees were uprooted, resulting in two crushed vehicles, and a fence was downed.						
EF0	N of Bassfield	Jefferson Davis	MS	31.5687°N 89.7513°W	17:35–17:37	1.08 mi (1.74 km)	50 yd (46 m)
EF0	A large tree was downed onto a truck. Other tree limbs and debris were downed.						

=== August 31 event ===
Events were associated with Hurricane Harvey.

List of confirmed tornadoes – Thursday, August 31, 2017
EF#	Location	County / Parish	State	Start Coord.	Time (UTC)	Path length	Max width
EF0	S of Helena	Phillips	AR	34.4751°N 90.6242°W	13:19–13:22	1.71 mi (2.75 km)	50 yd (46 m)
EF0	A house sustained minor damage.						
EF0	SW of Michigan City	Benton	MS	34.9455°N 89.3006°W	16:57–16:58	0.27 mi (0.43 km)	30 yd (27 m)
EF0	A metal barn was unroofed, and a few trees were uprooted.						
EF0	N of Tupelo	Lee	MS	34.3144°N 88.7272°W	18:13–18:15	1.07 mi (1.72 km)	40 yd (37 m)
EF0	A tornado moved through an open field, causing no damage.						
EF1	NW of Fulton	Itawamba	MS	34.4294°N 88.5135°W	18:23–18:27	2.47 mi (3.98 km)	150 yd (140 m)
EF1	Three mobile homes were damaged, one of which was carried 100 ft (30 m). A small commercial building sustained roof damage, and trees were damaged.						
EF0	S of Booneville	Prentiss	MS	34.5998°N 88.5679°W	18:43–18:44	0.25 mi (0.40 km)	30 yd (27 m)
EF0	A few trees were uprooted, the roof and carport of an uninhabited home were damaged, and the roof of a barn was damaged.						
EF0	WNW of Crump	Hardin	TN	35.2294°N 88.3411°W	20:07–20:09	1.25 mi (2.01 km)	50 yd (46 m)
EF0	Irrigation equipment was damaged.						
EF2	Western Reform to ESE of Bluff	Pickens, Lamar, Fayette	AL	33.3793°N 88.0344°W	20:40–21:26	31.24 mi (50.28 km)	600 yd (550 m)
EF2	This strong, long-tracked tornado was first seen touching down in the western part of Reform live from the ABC 33/40 skycam near Reform Elementary School. The tornado quickly reached it peak intensity as it moved northeastward, destroying several homes and a mobile home, and flipped vehicles. A small, unanchored frame home was also obliterated and swept from its block foundation. The tornado then weakened, but still caused extensive tree and power line damage as it moved into and through Palmetto, where a fire station was also heavily damaged. Elsewhere along the path, power lines were downed, many trees were snapped and uprooted, and a few homes sustained minor to moderate damage. Six people were injured.						
EF0	W of Hohenwald	Perry	TN	35.5402°N 87.7327°W	21:19–21:20	0.25 mi (0.40 km)	50 yd (46 m)
EF0	A home lost its porch and most of its metal roof. Several trees were toppled.						
EF0	Olive Hill	Hardin	TN	35.2669°N 88.0316°W	22:03–22:04	0.75 mi (1.21 km)	70 yd (64 m)
EF0	Carports, sheds, and trees were damaged.						
EF0	WNW of Mount Pleasant	Maury	TN	35.5178°N 87.2251°W	22:11–22:20	3.42 mi (5.50 km)	75 yd (69 m)
EF0	Many large tree limbs were snapped and a number of large trees were uprooted. Sheet metal was ripped off a home's large porch and several farm storage outbuildings and sheds.						
EF1	SW of Eoline	Bibb	AL	32.9173°N 87.3345°W	23:57–00:10	6.5 mi (10.5 km)	100 yd (91 m)
EF1	An anchored barn and shed were both collapsed, an unanchored mobile home was rolled over, and numerous trees were snapped. The roofs of an abandoned structure and a shed were damaged.						
EF1	SW of West Blocton	Bibb	AL	33.1008°N 87.1718°W	00:28–00:30	0.56 mi (0.90 km)	200 yd (180 m)
EF1	Numerous trees were snapped or uprooted.						
EF0	SE of Woodstock	Bibb	AL	33.196°N 87.1277°W	00:42–00:44	0.3 mi (0.48 km)	35 yd (32 m)
EF0	Several trees were uprooted.						
EF2	SE of Holly Pond to NW of Arab	Cullman, Marshall	AL	34.1522°N 86.6058°W	01:58–02:17	13.63 mi (21.94 km)	300 yd (270 m)
EF2	A strong tornado completely destroyed many chicken houses, with debris scattered hundreds of yards. Many trees and power poles were snapped, and a house sustained minor roof damage.						
EF1	Northeastern Nashville	Davidson	TN	36.2073°N 86.854°W	04:21–04:22	0.62 mi (1.00 km)	75 yd (69 m)
EF1	A house had a large portion of its roof ripped off. Other homes sustained less severe roof damage, two carports were collapsed, and nearly 100 large trees were snapped or uprooted.						
EF0	Southeastern Nashville	Davidson	TN	36.1597°N 86.7079°W	04:47–04:48	0.94 mi (1.51 km)	50 yd (46 m)
EF0	Several trees were uprooted, a small garage and a carport were damaged, and warehouse had a large section of its wall blown out. An 18-wheeler was flipped over as well.						

== September ==
Confirmed tornadoes by Enhanced Fujita rating
EFU	EF0	EF1	EF2	EF3	EF4	EF5	Total
1	22	24	4	0	0	0	51

=== September 1 event ===
List of confirmed tornadoes – Friday, September 1, 2017
EF#	Location	County / Parish	State	Start Coord.	Time (UTC)	Path length	Max width
EF0	Stump Lake	Nelson	ND	47.92°N 98.42°W	22:30–22:31	0.07 mi (0.11 km)	50 yd (46 m)
EF0	A water swirl was noted on the northern end of Stump Lake.						
EF0	E of Stump Lake	Nelson	ND	47.91°N 98.35°W	22:38–22:54	6.02 mi (9.69 km)	150 yd (140 m)
EF0	A trained storm spotter reported a persistent rope tornado with intermittent dust swirls.						
EF0	ENE of Cooperstown	Griggs	ND	47.5053°N 98.0044°W	00:16–00:22	1.67 mi (2.69 km)	150 yd (140 m)
EF0	Large tree branches were broken.						

=== September 4 event ===
List of confirmed tornadoes – Monday, September 4, 2017
EF#	Location	County / Parish	State	Start Coord.	Time (UTC)	Path length	Max width
EF2	W of North Robinson to N of Mansfield	Crawford, Richland	OH	40.7892°N 82.877°W	02:42–03:02	16.67 mi (26.83 km)	400 yd (370 m)
EF2	This strong tornado touched down near North Robinson and struck the northern part of town, where homes were significantly damaged, detached garages were completely destroyed, and severe tree damage occurred. A house outside of town was shifted off of its foundation. The tornado continued east and passed north of Leesville, severely damaging a large barn, causing extensive tree damage, and destroying two outbuildings. North of Crestline, a brick garage collapsed, a house had its roof partially torn off, an outbuilding was destroyed, and many trees or snapped or had their tops twisted off. High-end EF2 damage shortly occurred after the tornado crossed into Richland County, as a home had half of its roof torn off and a few exterior walls collapsed. Two residents at this home were injured after being thrown from their bedroom into the yard. A nearby garage was completely destroyed, with debris and a riding mower thrown 100 yards downwind. Less severe tree and structural damage occurred along the remainder of the path before the tornado dissipated near Mansfield.						

=== September 9 event ===
Florida events were associated with Hurricane Irma.

List of confirmed tornadoes – Saturday, September 9, 2017
EF#	Location	County / Parish	State	Start Coord.	Time (UTC)	Path length	Max width
EF1	ESE of Miramar	Broward	FL	25.9878°N 80.3756°W	12:10–12:11	0.1 mi (0.16 km)	50 yd (46 m)
EF1	Sections of trees were completely ripped apart.						
EF1	W of Ochopee	Collier	FL	25.9022°N 81.3274°W	16:20–16:23	0.25 mi (0.40 km)	50 yd (46 m)
EF1	Wooden power poles were leant.						
EFU	NW of Falcon	El Paso	CO	38.9517°N 104.6513°W	20:45–20:49	0.28 mi (0.45 km)	50 yd (46 m)
EFU	Two brief landspouts caused no damage.						
EF0	Wilton Manors	Broward	FL	26.1383°N 80.1039°W	22:35–22:39	1.93 mi (3.11 km)	100 yd (91 m)
EF0	A discontinuous tornado track was discovered. Multiple trees were damaged.						
EF0	SE of Homestead	Miami-Dade	FL	25.44°N 80.39°W	23:20–23:22	0.5 mi (0.80 km)	75 yd (69 m)
EF0	A member of the public reported a tornado.						

=== September 10 event ===
Events were associated with Hurricane Irma.

List of confirmed tornadoes – Sunday, September 10, 2017
EF#	Location	County / Parish	State	Start Coord.	Time (UTC)	Path length	Max width
EF1	NNW of Miramar	Broward	FL	26.0139°N 80.4065°W	11:40–11:42	0.25 mi (0.40 km)	50 yd (46 m)
EF1	Several trees were ripped apart, and roof tiles were damaged.						
EF1	N of Wauchula	Hardee	FL	27.565°N 81.8147°W	12:59–13:01	0.03 mi (0.048 km)	50 yd (46 m)
EF1	A business sustained roof damage and power poles were downed. The survey crew experienced trouble differentiating tornadic damage versus hurricane damage.						
EF0	Melbourne Beach	Brevard	FL	28.0701°N 80.5584°W	13:19	0.2 mi (0.32 km)	50 yd (46 m)
EF0	A waterspout moved ashore, causing minor damage to the second floors of two homes.						
EF1	ENE of Palm Bay	Brevard	FL	28.0317°N 80.5755°W	15:00–15:02	1.33 mi (2.14 km)	75 yd (69 m)
EF1	A waterspout moved ashore, damaging several residences including a waterfront home whose second floor was ripped off and carried downwind. A university building sustained minor roof damage, several mobile homes were heavily damaged or destroyed, and many trees were damaged.						
EF2	WSW of Polk City	Polk	FL	28.1529°N 81.8789°W	15:19–15:21	0.59 mi (0.95 km)	50 yd (46 m)
EF2	Seven wooden high power transmission poles were snapped.						
EF1	Indialantic	Brevard	FL	28.0943°N 80.5665°W	15:24–15:26	1.21 mi (1.95 km)	75 yd (69 m)
EF1	A waterspout moved ashore, ripping part of the roof off a beachfront condo and depositing it onto a bank. Damage was inflicted to trees, roof shingles, and the soffits of several homes.						
EF1	N of St. Augustine	St. Johns	FL	29.9°N 81.31°W	17:40–17:45	1.2 mi (1.9 km)	50 yd (46 m)
EF1	A waterspout moved ashore, causing significant tree damage in Huguenot Cemetery and farther inland.						
EF2	N of Mims	Brevard	FL	28.6864°N 80.8366°W	21:48–21:50	1.55 mi (2.49 km)	125 yd (114 m)
EF2	Numerous homes were impacted by this strong tornado, several of which were left uninhabitable due to severe roof damage. Many trees were snapped or uprooted, and a pick-up truck was rolled about 30 ft (9.1 m) into a fence.						
EF1	NW of Mims	Brevard	FL	28.6894°N 80.8551°W	22:00–22:01	0.48 mi (0.77 km)	60 yd (55 m)
EF1	Several trees were snapped or uprooted. Over a dozen homes were damaged in the Northgate Mobile Home Park and RV Park. Several power poles were snapped, one of which landed on a house. Several unoccupied RVs were rolled onto their sides.						
EF1	Umatilla	Lake	FL	28.9394°N 81.6238°W	22:28–22:30	3.84 mi (6.18 km)	500 yd (460 m)
EF1	Several homes had their roofs peeled back. Numerous trees were snapped or uprooted. A scoreboard was toppled and three power poles were snapped at the North Lake Community Park. Approximately 10 recreational vehicles were destroyed and another 25 others were damaged at the Olde Mill RV Resort. The roofs of the Umatilla Inn, an elementary school, and a residence were damaged.						
EF1	SSE of Vilano Beach	St. Johns	FL	29.93°N 81.30°W	23:50–23:56	4.99 mi (8.03 km)	200 yd (180 m)
EF1	A waterspout moved ashore in Vilano Beach, snapping and uprooting a few trees.						
EF1	Ormond Beach	Volusia	FL	29.2901°N 81.0574°W	01:04–01:05	0.78 mi (1.26 km)	175 yd (160 m)
EF1	A waterspout moved onshore, initially causing minor siding and shingle damage to a few two-story homes. Other houses and two commercial buildings further inland sustained major roof damage. Trees were downed or uprooted.						
EF1	Patrick Air Force Base	Brevard	FL	28.2302°N 80.5997°W	01:04–01:05	1.23 mi (1.98 km)	50 yd (46 m)
EF1	A waterspout moved onshore and removed the roof of a small building. Several storage buildings sustained minor to moderate damage, several large steel CONEX storage containers were rolled over 100 ft (30 m) downwind, and antennas mounted on free-standing towers were damaged. Small trees and shrubs were damaged.						
EF1	SSE of Rockledge	Brevard	FL	28.2791°N 80.6899°W	01:14–01:15	0.3 mi (0.48 km)	60 yd (55 m)
EF1	Approximately six homes sustained significant roof damage while several other houses sustained lesser degrees of shingle damage. At least one screen patio was destroyed while several others were damaged; fences were blown over and carried downwind. Numerous trees were snapped or uprooted.						
EF1	N of Merritt Island	Brevard	FL	28.4171°N 80.6767°W	01:48–01:50	3.36 mi (5.41 km)	60 yd (55 m)
EF1	Over a dozen homes sustained significant shingle damage; six pool screen enclosures were destroyed. Numerous trees were snapped and other homes sustained lesser damage. At the Island Lakes Mobile Home Park, over 25 homes mobile homes were impacted, several of which were destroyed and many others sustained moderate to major damage. The steeple was toppled at the Orsino Baptist Church.						
EF0	S of Marineland	Flagler	FL	29.6455°N 81.21°W	04:20–04:30	4.12 mi (6.63 km)	200 yd (180 m)
EF0	An aerial survey found a swath of tree damage.						

=== September 11 event ===
Events were associated with Hurricane Irma.

List of confirmed tornadoes – Monday, September 11, 2017
EF#	Location	County / Parish	State	Start Coord.	Time (UTC)	Path length	Max width
EF2	SE of Crescent Beach	St. Johns	FL	29.72°N 81.23°W	05:15–05:20	1.2 mi (1.9 km)	300 yd (270 m)
EF2	Brief but strong tornado caused major damage to several large condominium buildings, which had roofs torn off and top floor exterior walls collapsed. Tree damage occurred as well.						
EF0	NNW of Amelia City	Nassau	FL	30.61°N 81.57°W	06:25–06:30	5.95 mi (9.58 km)	100 yd (91 m)
EF0	Though the tornado tracked over open territory, a tornado debris signature was noted.						
EF0	NNW of Fernandina Beach	Nassau	FL	30.69°N 81.46°W	06:25–06:35	10.69 mi (17.20 km)	100 yd (91 m)
EF0	Though the tornado tracked over open marsh, a tornado debris signature was noted.						
EF0	Joint Base Charleston	Charleston	SC	32.8915°N 80.0436°W	18:48–18:50	1.46 mi (2.35 km)	60 yd (55 m)
EF0	On Joint Base Charleston, the edge of the roof on the control tower was pushed back, the fascia of a nearby building was damaged, and the roof of another metal building on the base was damaged. Two large oak trees and several large branches were downed.						
EF1	S of Charleston Executive Airport	Charleston	SC	32.6750°N 80.0055°W	21:45–21:47	0.43 mi (0.69 km)	30 yd (27 m)
EF1	A shed was destroyed, and a large live oak tree was snapped (and many other threes were damaged). A well pump and cement anchors for a chain link fence were ripped from the ground. A home was knocked off pilings, sustaining significant roof damage and crushing a pickup truck.						
EF0	E of James Island	Charleston	SC	32.7264°N 79.9111°W	22:19–22:21	0.12 mi (0.19 km)	55 yd (50 m)
EF0	A residence had part of its roof blown off while a second lost four shutters. Debris carried from the second home inflicted soffit damage to a third. A few trees were damaged.						
EF0	NNW of Olar	Bamberg	SC	33.19°N 81.19°W	23:01–23:05	2 mi (3.2 km)	50 yd (46 m)
EF0	A few trees and several large limbs were downed.						
EF0	E of Mount Pleasant	Charleston	SC	32.8027°N 79.8403°W	23:13–23:15	0.57 mi (0.92 km)	90 yd (82 m)
EF0	Large tree limbs were downed, a few trees were uprooted, and a wooden fence was toppled.						

=== September 13 event ===
List of confirmed tornadoes – Wednesday, September 13, 2017
EF#	Location	County / Parish	State	Start Coord.	Time (UTC)	Path length	Max width
EF0	Lake Tahoe	Washoe	NV	39.1785°N 119.9606°W	22:51–23:15	2.01 mi (3.23 km)	50 yd (46 m)
EF0	North Lake Tahoe Fire Protection District reported a confirmed waterspout.						

=== September 15 event ===
List of confirmed tornadoes – Friday, September 15, 2017
EF#	Location	County / Parish	State	Start Coord.	Time (UTC)	Path length	Max width
EF0	ENE of Windfred	Lake	SD	44.0202°N 97.3186°W	00:04–00:08	0.1 mi (0.16 km)	100 yd (91 m)
EF0	Very old outbuildings at an abandoned farmstead were damaged.						

=== September 19 event ===
List of confirmed tornadoes – Tuesday, September 19, 2017
EF#	Location	County / Parish	State	Start Coord.	Time (UTC)	Path length	Max width
EF1	ENE of Lacomb	Linn	OR	44.5918°N 122.7041°W	20:07–20:15	0.69 mi (1.11 km)	167 yd (153 m)
EF1	Several large trees were snapped, five farm buildings were damaged, and two power poles were downed.						
EF1	ENE of Litchville	Barnes	ND	46.66°N 98.17°W	21:41–21:47	3.7 mi (6.0 km)	200 yd (180 m)
EF1	Several trees were snapped and uprooted. Roofing material and a door of a shed were damaged.						
EF1	SW of Tulare	Spink	SD	44.6717°N 98.5656°W	00:46–00:57	2.75 mi (4.43 km)	155 yd (142 m)
EF1	An outbuilding sustained significant structural and roof damage. A few trees were uprooted. Slight crop damage occurred through a soybean field. An irrigation unit was toppled and corn crop was leveled.						
EF1	Beltrami	Norman, Polk	MN	47.48°N 96.53°W	00:50–01:01	4.57 mi (7.35 km)	100 yd (91 m)
EF1	Several trees were snapped, while a metal garage and metal storage building in town were damaged with debris scattered through a nearby field.						
EF0	SW of Clark	Clark	SD	44.8338°N 97.7961°W	01:55–01:56	0.08 mi (0.13 km)	10 yd (9.1 m)
EF0	A trained storm spotter reported a brief tornado in an open field.						
EF0	E of Bradley	Clark	SD	45.0904°N 97.6304°W	02:26–02:27	0.11 mi (0.18 km)	10 yd (9.1 m)
EF0	A WeatherNation meteorologist reported a brief tornado in an open field.						

=== September 20 event ===
List of confirmed tornadoes – Wednesday, September 20, 2017
EF#	Location	County / Parish	State	Start Coord.	Time (UTC)	Path length	Max width
EF0	S of Montevideo	Chippewa	MN	44.936°N 95.7351°W	05:18–05:20	2.12 mi (3.41 km)	100 yd (91 m)
EF0	Siding and shingles were taken off a few homes. Trees were damaged.						
EF1	S of Montevideo	Chippewa	MN	44.9213°N 95.7191°W	05:22–05:23	0.11 mi (0.18 km)	80 yd (73 m)
EF1	Dozens of trees were snapped and uprooted.						
EF1	N of Murdock to N of Sunburg	Swift, Kandiyohi	MN	45.255°N 95.423°W	05:28–05:39	12.59 mi (20.26 km)	550 yd (500 m)
EF1	A church and a restaurant lost part of their roofs, six empty grain bins were blown apart, and five machine storage sheds were destroyed. Corn fields were destroyed and many trees were downed or snapped.						
EF1	NW of Sunburg	Swift, Pope	MN	45.3909°N 95.4114°W	05:32–05:39	9.2 mi (14.8 km)	880 yd (800 m)
EF1	Corn fields were damaged or destroyed. Part of the roof was ripped from a turkey barn, a mobile home was rolled, and two machine sheds and several outbuildings were destroyed. A modular home had its windows blown in, porch blown away, and roof uplifted. Trees were damaged.						
EF0	Belgrade	Stearns	MN	45.4528°N 95.009°W	05:48–05:49	1.16 mi (1.87 km)	330 yd (300 m)
EF0	Several dozen trees were downed, many of which landed on cars and sheds, and one of which landed on a mobile home. A storage building was destroyed.						
EF1	N of Elrosa	Stearns	MN	45.5505°N 95.0572°W	05:49–05:56	8.18 mi (13.16 km)	360 yd (330 m)
EF1	Several metal sheds were destroyed on a farm. Many trees were downed or uprooted, and crops were severely damaged, especially corn crops ready for harvest.						
EF1	W of Swanville	Todd	MN	45.882°N 94.7425°W	06:04–06:11	6.75 mi (10.86 km)	440 yd (400 m)
EF1	A number of lake homes and cabins sustained roof damage. A boat and attached dock in the community of Pillsbury were blown westward into Long Lake. Dozens of trees were downed or snapped. One home was shifted off its foundation while another sustained roof and window damage.						

=== September 21 event ===
List of confirmed tornadoes – Thursday, September 21, 2017
EF#	Location	County / Parish	State	Start Coord.	Time (UTC)	Path length	Max width
EF0	Lake Tahoe	Douglas	NV	39.04°N 119.97°W	22:29–22:34	0.44 mi (0.71 km)	20 yd (18 m)
EF0	A citizen reported two brief waterspouts on Lake Tahoe.						

=== September 25 event ===
List of confirmed tornadoes – Monday, September 25, 2017
EF#	Location	County / Parish	State	Start Coord.	Time (UTC)	Path length	Max width
EF0	Lake Corpus Christi	Live Oak	TX	28.0531°N 97.8921°W	19:10–19:11	0.1 mi (0.16 km)	15 yd (14 m)
EF0	Law enforcement reported a waterspout on Lake Corpus Christi.						

=== September 30 event ===
List of confirmed tornadoes – Saturday, September 30, 2017
EF#	Location	County / Parish	State	Start Coord.	Time (UTC)	Path length	Max width
EF0	SE of Laguna	Cibola	NM	34.9611°N 107.1871°W	20:55–20:57	2.45 mi (3.94 km)	30 yd (27 m)
EF0	An emergency manager reported a tornado.						

== October ==
Confirmed tornadoes by Enhanced Fujita rating
EFU	EF0	EF1	EF2	EF3	EF4	EF5	Total
2	32	32	6	0	0	0	72

=== October 2 event ===
List of confirmed tornadoes – Monday, October 2, 2017
EF#	Location	County / Parish	State	Start Coord.	Time (UTC)	Path length	Max width
EF0	N of Morland	Graham	KS	39.3785°N 100.1223°W	22:53–22:59	3.4 mi (5.5 km)	100 yd (91 m)
EF0	A storm chaser reported a tornado.						
EF0	NE of Hill City	Graham	KS	39.4578°N 99.7739°W	23:30–23:31	0.59 mi (0.95 km)	100 yd (91 m)
EF0	A storm chaser reported a tornado.						
EF0	NNW of Webster	Rooks	KS	39.5499°N 99.4754°W	23:57	0.01 mi (0.016 km)	15 yd (14 m)
EF0	Multiple people reported a tornado.						
EF0	NNW of Modoc	Scott	KS	38.5512°N 101.1186°W	23:53–23:57	4.47 mi (7.19 km)	100 yd (91 m)
EF0	A well-documented tornado caused light damage.						
EF1	NNW of Modoc	Scott	KS	38.5434°N 101.0318°W	00:02–00:05	2.5 mi (4.0 km)	150 yd (140 m)
EF1	Irrigation sprinklers, power poles, and trees were damaged.						
EF2	S of Elkader	Scott, Gove	KS	38.6056°N 100.9164°W	00:09–00:33	18.31 mi (29.47 km)	450 yd (410 m)
EF2	EF2-level damage was inflicted to outbuildings, power poles, and farm equipment.						
EF0	SE of Whitelaw	Greeley	KS	38.3805°N 101.6131°W	00:15–00:16	0.73 mi (1.17 km)	100 yd (91 m)
EF0	A storm chaser observed a tornado.						
EF1	SSW of Gove City	Gove	KS	38.8132°N 100.5402°W	00:43–00:44	0.41 mi (0.66 km)	75 yd (69 m)
EF1	Several large trees were snapped, a few farm structures sustained significant roof damage, and sheet metal was blown from fencing.						
EF0	ESE of Gove City	Gove	KS	38.9296°N 100.3967°W	00:58–00:59	0.14 mi (0.23 km)	50 yd (46 m)
EF0	A structure collapsed, a trailer blown over, several tree limbs were snapped, and a single-pole residential cell tower was toppled.						
EF1	Quinter	Gove	KS	39.067°N 100.2363°W	01:24–01:26	0.54 mi (0.87 km)	100 yd (91 m)
EF1	The tornado began at an elementary school, with damage to the playground equipment and its fence blown over. City buildings, a few businesses, and a few single-wide mobile homes were damaged, with one mobile home blown off its supports. Porches were blown over, and numerous trees were snapped or sustained significant branch damage.						
EF0	NW of St. Edward	Boone	NE	41.6024°N 97.9204°W	04:42–04:43	0.28 mi (0.45 km)	20 yd (18 m)
EF0	Grain bins, trees, crops, and a small farm outbuilding were damaged.						

=== October 6 event ===
List of confirmed tornadoes – Friday, October 6, 2017
EF#	Location	County / Parish	State	Start Coord.	Time (UTC)	Path length	Max width
EF1	SSE of Peoria	Arapahoe	CO	39.65°N 104.11°W	22:25	0.01 mi (0.016 km)	25 yd (23 m)
EF1	A storm chaser observed a brief landspout tornado in a field.						
EF0	NNW of Chase	Rice	KS	38.378°N 98.3727°W	23:56–23:57	0.73 mi (1.17 km)	50 yd (46 m)
EF0	A sheet metal roof from a chicken farm was damaged.						
EF0	N of Marquette	Saline	KS	38.67°N 97.83°W	00:50–00:54	2.36 mi (3.80 km)	50 yd (46 m)
EF0	Chasers reports and video confirmed a tornado.						
EF1	NNE of Olsburg	Pottawatomie	KS	39.4504°N 96.6082°W	03:06–03:09	1.1 mi (1.8 km)	40 yd (37 m)
EF1	A three-sided building was blown over, a tin roof was ripped off a barn, and trees and outbuildings sustained minor damage.						

=== October 7 event ===
Alabama and Mississippi events were associated with Hurricane Nate.

List of confirmed tornadoes – Saturday, October 7, 2017
EF#	Location	County / Parish	State	Start Coord.	Time (UTC)	Path length	Max width
EF0	SSW of Gulf Shores	Baldwin	AL	30.246°N 87.6926°W	18:58–28:59	0.07 mi (0.11 km)	25 yd (23 m)
EF0	Several beach-goers videoed a waterspout moving ashore.						
EF0	Western Mobile	Mobile	AL	30.6848°N 88.2125°W	21:47–21:48	0.27 mi (0.43 km)	25 yd (23 m)
EF0	Several large oak tree limbs were downed, a large billboard was downed and twisted, and a small professional building experienced shingle, facade, and window damage. Windows were also blown out at a car dealership.						
EF0	Eastern Madison	Dane	WI	43.0905°N 89.3565°W	21:59–22:15	9.7 mi (15.6 km)	100 yd (91 m)
EF0	Over 200 trees were damaged or destroyed, many of which landed on homes, garages, and vehicles. The rear wall of a car wash and the three-season porch of a house both collapsed. Four commercial buildings and twelve to eighteen homes sustained damage. Several traffic standards, street signs, and construction barrels were downed or damaged as well. A truck topper was ripped from a truck and a small wood shed was damaged.						
EF0	NE of Greenville	Butler	AL	31.9460°N 86.5072°W	23:26–23:27	0.55 mi (0.89 km)	200 yd (180 m)
EF0	Sporadic tree damage was observed. A residence sustained damage to its metal roof.						
EF0	Orange Beach	Baldwin	AL	30.2927°N 87.5742°W	23:34–23:35	0.13 mi (0.21 km)	25 yd (23 m)
EF0	A brief tornado damaged some trees.						
EF0	S of Hayneville	Lowndes	AL	32.1438°N 86.5919°W	23:55–00:00	2.9 mi (4.7 km)	400 yd (370 m)
EF0	Trees were snapped and uprooted.						
EF1	S of Autaugaville	Autauga	AL	32.4015°N 86.6530°W	00:31–00:38	3.93 mi (6.32 km)	625 yd (572 m)
EF1	Numerous trees were snapped and uprooted.						
EF0	Sunman	Ripley, Dearborn	IN	39.2261°N 85.108°W	01:05–01:09	5.72 mi (9.21 km)	100 yd (91 m)
EF0	An anchored mobile home was pushed a few feet off its foundation, two large sheet metal doors were blown off a barn, and a small portion of siding was ripped from a property. A tractor trailer was partially tipped off, a barn sustained extensive damage, and numerous trees were snapped or uprooted, including some that fell on homes.						
EF0	NNE of Pletcher	Chilton	AL	32.7383°N 86.7677°W	01:20–01:27	3.01 mi (4.84 km)	50 yd (46 m)
EF0	Damage was sporadic, consisting mainly of broken twigs and branches.						
EF1	ENE of Campbell	Chilton	AL	32.8951°N 86.8269°W	01:47–02:00	5.94 mi (9.56 km)	150 yd (140 m)
EF1	Numerous trees were snapped or uprooted, including one that fell on a residence.						
EF0	SE of Waynesboro	Wayne	MS	31.6519°N 88.6079°W	02:28–02:29	0.6 mi (0.97 km)	200 yd (180 m)
EF0	Three homes sustained roof damage, and a few trees were uprooted.						

=== October 8 event ===
Events were associated with Hurricane Nate.

List of confirmed tornadoes – Sunday, October 8, 2017
EF#	Location	County / Parish	State	Start Coord.	Time (UTC)	Path length	Max width
EF1	NE of Greenwood	Laurens	SC	34.291°N 82.044°W	20:08–20:30	12 mi (19 km)	100 yd (91 m)
EF1	Mostly minor damage was inflicted to homes; numerous trees were downed. A few outbuildings were damaged or destroyed.						
EF1	NW of Gaffney	Cherokee	SC	35.16°N 81.711°W	20:16–20:17	0.07 mi (0.11 km)	100 yd (91 m)
EF1	Two homes sustained minor exterior and roof damage; some plywood was torn off the exterior of an attic of one home, and subsequent rainfall caused water damage. Flying debris broke out windows. Multiple trees were downed.						
EF1	NW of Chappells	Newberry	SC	34.209°N 81.917°W	20:20–20:27	2.6 mi (4.2 km)	50 yd (46 m)
EF1	Numerous large trees were snapped at their trunks and a wood-framed work shed was tossed. The roof of a home was damaged, and a workshop building sustained major damage and had two garage doors blown inward, with metal roofing scattered. A portion of the home's front porch was lifted and tossed, and a large work trailer was overturned.						
EF2	W of Pickens	Pickens	SC	34.764°N 82.76°W	20:36–20:48	8.42 mi (13.55 km)	300 yd (270 m)
EF2	An intermittent but high-end EF2 tornado touched down three separate times, inflicting damage to 20 homes, of which 5 were severely damaged. One brick home sustained total destruction of its roof and front exterior wall. Several outbuildings and sheds were damaged or destroyed, and numerous trees were snapped or uprooted. Two mobile homes were completely destroyed, and a communications tower was damaged as well.						
EF2	W of Cross Hill to Glenn Springs	Laurens, Spartanburg	SC	34.51°N 81.967°W	20:40–21:21	22.28 mi (35.86 km)	200 yd (180 m)
EF2	This strong tornado snapped and uprooted many trees along its path, and damaged or destroyed numerous outbuildings. Homes and manufactured homes were damaged, and a trailer park was severely impacted near Laurens. Several trailers were destroyed at that location, and one person was injured. One frame home was largely destroyed, sustaining loss of its roof and multiple cinder block exterior walls. Considerable building and tree damage occurred in Glenn Springs before the tornado dissipated.						
EF0	ESE of Polkville	Cleveland, Burke	NC	35.4°N 81.618°W	20:54–21:20	13.46 mi (21.66 km)	100 yd (91 m)
EF0	Numerous small to medium-sized trees were snapped or uprooted. Shingles were removed from homes while metal sheet roofing was ripped off a couple of buildings and chicken houses. A metal carport was ripped from a home and tossed.						
EF0	WSW of Buffalo	Union	SC	34.722°N 81.745°W	21:34–21:36	0.21 mi (0.34 km)	200 yd (180 m)
EF0	Numerous trees were snapped or uprooted, a home lost some of its roof panels, and an outbuilding was damaged.						
EF1	NNE of Pleasant Grove	Burke	NC	35.683°N 81.532°W	21:34–21:44	2.19 mi (3.52 km)	250 yd (230 m)
EF1	Numerous trees were snapped or uprooted, a manufactured home had part of its roof ripped off while a couple of attached structures were heavily damaged or destroyed. An old home had most of its shingles and part of its roof removed and windows blown out, an old outbuilding was destroyed, and another manufactured home was slid off its concrete foundation.						
EF1	Tryon	Greenville, Polk	SC, NC	35.174°N 82.242°W	21:37–21:42	2.01 mi (3.23 km)	200 yd (180 m)
EF1	Hundreds of trees were snapped or uprooted, with several landing on homes and vehicles. Homes in Tryon sustained damage to their roofs and siding, and a company reported damage to six of its generators, including one 2,400 lb (1,100 kg) unit that was moved.						
EF0	S of Hudson	Caldwell	NC	35.794°N 81.499°W	21:51–21:55	2.42 mi (3.89 km)	100 yd (91 m)
EF0	Trees were downed and minor structural damage was observed.						
EF1	NNW of Hudson	Caldwell	NC	35.858°N 81.486°W	22:01–22:11	6.71 mi (10.80 km)	400 yd (370 m)
EF1	A large truck was overturned and numerous trees were snapped or uprooted, one of which caused significant damage to a home. Two small houses had a majority of their roofs ripped off. Two churches had their steeples toppled and sustained additional roof damage, while power lines were downed.						
EF1	NW of Wilkesboro	Wilkes, Ashe	NC	36.1999°N 81.4368°W	22:45–23:00	7.08 mi (11.39 km)	300 yd (270 m)
EF1	A majority of damage consisted of snapped trees; however, half a dozen structures suffered minor damage. This is the first documented tornado on record in Ashe County.						

=== October 12 event ===
List of confirmed tornadoes – Thursday, October 12, 2017
EF#	Location	County / Parish	State	Start Coord.	Time (UTC)	Path length	Max width
EF0	Mount Vista	Clark	WA	45.7259°N 122.6393°W	22:05–22:08	0.16 mi (0.26 km)	25 yd (23 m)
EF0	Limbs were broken off trees, a fence was toppled, and patio furniture was damaged.						
EF0	N or Aurora	Marion	OR	45.2555°N 122.7778°W	22:39–22:40	0.62 mi (1.00 km)	50 yd (46 m)
EF0	Damage was inflicted to greenhouses near the Aurora State Airport, where two planes were flipped.						

=== October 14 event ===
List of confirmed tornadoes – Saturday, October 14, 2017
EF#	Location	County / Parish	State	Start Coord.	Time (UTC)	Path length	Max width
EF1	E of Gorin	Scotland	MO	40.3586°N 91.9832°W	22:09–22:10	0.1 mi (0.16 km)	10 yd (9.1 m)
EF1	One farm outbuilding was completely destroyed and two others were damaged.						
EF0	W of Bowen	Hancock	IL	40.2324°N 91.0823°W	23:25–23:26	0.82 mi (1.32 km)	25 yd (23 m)
EF0	Damage was confined to trees.						

=== October 20 event ===
List of confirmed tornadoes – Friday, October 20, 2017
EF#	Location	County / Parish	State	Start Coord.	Time (UTC)	Path length	Max width
EF0	N of Dickinson	Galveston	TX	29.4757°N 95.0738°W	09:58–10:02	0.5 mi (0.80 km)	300 yd (270 m)
EF0	Trees were downed and branches were broken. Minor damage was inflicted to fencing, outbuildings, the windows to homes, and cars. Numerous outdoor household goods were damaged and tossed, and numerous power lines were downed.						

=== October 21 event ===
List of confirmed tornadoes – Saturday, October 21, 2017
EF#	Location	County / Parish	State	Start Coord.	Time (UTC)	Path length	Max width
EFU	SE of Manitou	Tillman	OK	34.4793°N 98.9428°W	22:23	0.1 mi (0.16 km)	20 yd (18 m)
EFU	Numerous storm chasers observed a brief landspout tornado.						
EFU	E of Indiahoma	Comanche	OK	34.62°N 98.7148°W	23:05	0.2 mi (0.32 km)	30 yd (27 m)
EFU	Video footage confirmed a tornado.						
EF1	E of Apache	Caddo	OK	34.8966°N 98.2702°W	00:08–00:16	4.8 mi (7.7 km)	200 yd (180 m)
EF1	Numerous trees were snapped or damaged.						
EF1	NE of Apache	Caddo	OK	34.9248°N 98.252°W	00:12–00:13	0.5 mi (0.80 km)	50 yd (46 m)
EF1	A home sustained roof damage and trees were snapped.						
EF1	NE of Apache	Caddo	OK	34.9405°N 98.2503°W	00:12–00:24	6.2 mi (10.0 km)	400 yd (370 m)
EF1	Trees were snapped or uprooted.						
EF1	NE of Apache	Caddo	OK	34.9575°N 98.2535°W	00:16–00:21	3.1 mi (5.0 km)	150 yd (140 m)
EF1	Barns sustained significant damage and trees were snapped.						
EF1	N of Cement	Caddo	OK	34.9673°N 98.1469°W	00:23–00:28	3.3 mi (5.3 km)	100 yd (91 m)
EF1	Trees were snapped.						
EF1	NW of Goldsby to Southwestern Norman	McClain, Cleveland	OK	35.1832°N 97.513°W	01:36–01:42	3.4 mi (5.5 km)	50 yd (46 m)
EF1	This high-end EF1 tornado snapped trees and power poles, downed fences and signs, and damaged or destroyed multiple large metal sheds and outbuildings. The Riverwind Casino sustained minor roof and facade damage, and a large air conditioning unit was displaced 15 to 20 feet at that location.						
EF1	Seminole	Seminole	OK	35.2392°N 96.6933°W	02:52–02:55	2 mi (3.2 km)	150 yd (140 m)
EF1	Significant tree damage was observed. Homes, businesses, and power lines throughout Seminole were damaged, and at least two homes sustained significant roof damage. Flying debris from a church was speared into the walls of nearby structures, and gravestones were blown over at a cemetery in town.						

=== October 22 event ===
List of confirmed tornadoes – Sunday, October 22, 2017
EF#	Location	County / Parish	State	Start Coord.	Time (UTC)	Path length	Max width
EF1	Pascagoula	Jackson	MS	30.3302°N 88.5066°W	17:10–17:13	1.39 mi (2.24 km)	100 yd (91 m)
EF1	A waterspout moved ashore on the east side of Pascagoula, causing significant damage to the roof and walls of a large metal building. Some damage to trailers occurred as well. One minor injury was treated at the scene.						

=== October 23 event ===
List of confirmed tornadoes – Monday, October 23, 2017
EF#	Location	County / Parish	State	Start Coord.	Time (UTC)	Path length	Max width
EF1	S of Trinity	Morgan	AL	34.5746°N 87.1057°W	07:28–07:33	2.4 mi (3.9 km)	75 yd (69 m)
EF1	Numerous trees were snapped or uprooted, and several well-built single-family homes were damaged by fallen trees. The tornado displaced one storage shed and damaged a second at an RV/boat storage facility.						
EF1	WNW of Woodruff to Western Spartanburg	Spartanburg	SC	34.778°N 82.085°W	18:52–19:10	12.68 mi (20.41 km)	100 yd (91 m)
EF1	Numerous trees were snapped, and homes sustained damage mainly to their roofs, gutters, and siding. Some homes in residential areas of western Spartanburg sustained damage from falling trees as well.						
EF2	Northwestern Spartanburg	Spartanburg	SC	34.972°N 81.989°W	19:12–19:18	3.02 mi (4.86 km)	350 yd (320 m)
EF2	This strong rain-wrapped tornado touched down in the northwestern part of Spartanburg. A concrete block-construction warehouse building suffered extensive damage, with an exterior wall collapsed and much of its roof ripped off. A forklift was overturned at this location. Multiple semi-trailers were damaged or destroyed, and several cars were flipped in a parking lot of an adjacent building. One person who sought shelter in a glass booth under a metal awning was hospitalized with burst ear drums due to the extreme change in air pressure. A second warehouse building lost much of its roofing, a third warehouse building had one of it walls collapsed, and many trees and power poles were snapped. A gas station was damaged, a metal truss tower was blown over, and a house was shifted off its foundation as well.						
EF2	WNW of Gaffney	Cherokee, Cleveland	SC, NC	35.114°N 81.727°W	19:36–19:42	4.86 mi (7.82 km)	150 yd (140 m)
EF2	Two homes had a majority of their roofs torn off. A third home was slid off of its foundation and largely destroyed. Power poles were snapped, and outbuildings were destroyed. The tornado produced minor structural damage, downed trees, and toppled power lines along the remainder of its path before it lifted just after crossing the North Carolina state line.						
EF1	SSW of Cliffside to ESE of Polkville	Cherokee, Rutherford, Cleveland	NC	35.138°N 81.825°W	19:33–20:02	21.83 mi (35.13 km)	150 yd (140 m)
EF1	Near the beginning of the path, windows were broken at a church in Cliffside and trees were downed in town. Elsewhere along the path, many trees were snapped and uprooted, several of which landed on structures. Windows were blown out of a school and a warehouse building was significantly damaged. A camper was overturned, and a man inside was tossed several yards without injury.						
EF1	NW of Lawndale	Cleveland, Lincoln, Catawba	NC	35.422°N 81.566°W	20:08–20:26	12.34 mi (19.86 km)	100 yd (91 m)
EF1	Numerous trees were snapped or downed, many of which fell on houses.						
EF2	Western Hickory to SE of Boomer	Burke, Catawba, Caldwell, Alexander	NC	35.743°N 81.39°W	20:37–20:51	11.35 mi (18.27 km)	1,300 yd (1,200 m)
EF2	This strong rain-wrapped tornado produced its most intense damage the beginning of its path, where a hangar and several planes were destroyed at Hickory Regional Airport. Hundreds of trees were downed as the tornado weakened and continued through residential areas of Hickory, as well as rural areas further to the north. Many of the trees landed on houses, cars, and other structures.						
EF1	NW of Taylorsville	Alexander	NC	35.922°N 81.287°W	20:54–21:02	8.17 mi (13.15 km)	200 yd (180 m)
EF1	Numerous trees were snapped or uprooted.						
EF1	Wilkesboro	Wilkes	NC	36.1499°N 81.1449°W	21:11–21:20	8.6 mi (13.8 km)	275 yd (251 m)
EF1	Buildings in town had significant portions of their roofs blown off. One large structure sustained partial collapse of a cinder block exterior wall.						
EF1	Providence	Grayson	VA	36.7005°N 81.0214°W	21:53–21:54	0.57 mi (0.92 km)	150 yd (140 m)
EF1	Numerous trees were snapped or uprooted. Multiple homes sustained various degrees of damage, including a residence and a barn that were demolished by a fallen tree.						
EF1	NW of Radford	Pulaski, Montgomery	VA	37.1756°N 80.6098°W	22:33–22:39	3.08 mi (4.96 km)	300 yd (270 m)
EF1	Farm trailers were tossed dozens of feet, and dozens of large trees were snapped and uprooted, several of which fell on houses, sheds, and vehicles. An unattached garage and workshop sustained significant damage, with its roof tossed onto the top of a two-story house nearby. The roof of that home was severely damaged, and power poles were snapped. Some other homes and buildings sustained minor roof damage before the tornado lifted.						
EF1	ENE of Conway	Horry	SC	33.8506°N 78.8966°W	02:27–02:29	0.36 mi (0.58 km)	75 yd (69 m)
EF1	Several dozen trees were snapped. A window was blown out of a garage, with the garage door slightly buckled.						
EF0	NW of Supply	Brunswick	NC	34.0593°N 78.3516°W	03:45–03:47	0.36 mi (0.58 km)	50 yd (46 m)
EF0	A few trees were snapped and a few larger limbs were downed.						

=== October 24 event ===
List of confirmed tornadoes – Tuesday, October 24, 2017
EF#	Location	County / Parish	State	Start Coord.	Time (UTC)	Path length	Max width
EF0	Rose Garden	King William	VA	37.627°N 76.9491°W	07:00–07:02	0.38 mi (0.61 km)	75 yd (69 m)
EF0	Numerous trees were snapped or downed, and 14 structures sustained damage. Some cars were also damaged.						
EF0	WNW of Weston	Broward	FL	26.14°N 80.46°W	19:15–19:16	0.01 mi (0.016 km)	20 yd (18 m)
EF0	Multiple photos and video confirmed a brief tornado. Time is estimated by radar.						

=== October 28 event ===
Events were associated with Tropical Storm Philippe.

List of confirmed tornadoes – Saturday, October 28, 2017
EF#	Location	County / Parish	State	Start Coord.	Time (UTC)	Path length	Max width
EF0	Westchester	Miami-Dade	FL	25.7333°N 80.3439°W	17:19–17:20	0.48 mi (0.77 km)	50 yd (46 m)
EF0	The front window of a shopping center was broken, and part of the Bird Bowl had its roof ripped off, allowing water into the meeting and mechanical rooms. A large dumpster was moved, power lines, trees, and fences were downed, and minor roof and siding damage was inflicted to homes.						
EF0	Boynton Beach	Palm Beach	FL	26.5436°N 80.1096°W	21:42–21:45	0.25 mi (0.40 km)	75 yd (69 m)
EF0	Minor roof damage was observed, most severely to a vacant mobile home which had a portion of its roof lifted off and carried several hundred yards. A light pole was broken.						
EF0	West Palm Beach	Palm Beach	FL	26.6451°N 80.0716°W	22:08–22:16	2.08 mi (3.35 km)	125 yd (114 m)
EF0	Power lines, cable lines, and fences were downed. Several trees were toppled.						

=== October 31 event ===
List of confirmed tornadoes – Tuesday, October 31, 2017
EF#	Location	County / Parish	State	Start Coord.	Time (UTC)	Path length	Max width
EF0	Buffalo	Erie	NY	42.8768°N 78.8939°W	13:15–13:18	0.4 mi (0.64 km)	10 yd (9.1 m)
EF0	A waterspout moved onshore and impacted a Coast Guard Base, smashing the windows of several cars with flying debris. A portion of a fence was blown off and damaged a nearby vehicle. A person outside was blown off his feet but uninjured.						

== See also ==
- Tornadoes of 2017
- List of United States tornadoes from June to July 2017
- List of United States tornadoes from November to December 2017
