= List of United States tornadoes from November to December 2017 =

This page documents all tornadoes confirmed by various weather forecast offices of the National Weather Service in the United States in November 2017. Based on the 1991–2010 averaging period, 58 tornadoes occur in the United States throughout November on average, with December averaging 24.

Despite most days producing no tornadoes, 2 moderate outbreaks would see November finish with 42 tornadoes, still well below average. Tornado events in December were sparse, with most tornadoes in the month occurring in a small outbreak on December 19-20. Overall, December finished well below average for the month, with just 12 tornadoes confirmed.

== United States yearly total ==
Confirmed tornadoes by Enhanced Fujita rating
EFU	EF0	EF1	EF2	EF3	EF4	EF5	Total
67	618	592*	128	13	2	0	1,420

- Note: An EF2 tornado from Canada crossed into the United States, where that portion of the track was rated EF1.

== November ==
Confirmed tornadoes by Enhanced Fujita rating
EFU	EF0	EF1	EF2	EF3	EF4	EF5	Total
0	12	25	5	0	0	0	42

=== November 5 event ===
List of confirmed tornadoes – Sunday, November 5, 2017 (Note: All dates are based on the local time zone where the tornado touched down; however, all times are in Coordinated Universal Time for consistency.)
EF#	Location	County / Parish	State	Start Coord.	Time (UTC)	Path length	Max width
EF1	NW of Springville	Lawrence	IN	38.9509°N 86.6385°W	18:20–18:25	2.87 mi (4.62 km)	150 yd (140 m)
EF1	A tornado downed dozens of trees. Over a dozen structures sustained minor to moderate damage. Two mobile homes and a garage were destroyed, and a church had its steeple torn off. A gas leak occurred and caused the evacuation of 90 to 100 homes. The Red Cross was set up to aid people at the Springville Elementary School.						
EF2	NW of Eaton, IN to W of Celina, OH	Delaware (IN), Blackford (IN), Jay (IN), Mercer (OH)	IN, OH	40.3491°N 85.3483°W	18:24–19:30	38.72 mi (62.31 km)	600 yd (550 m)
EF2	This long-track wedge tornado produced very high-end EF2 damage along its path. In Indiana, the tornado passed near the towns of Dunkirk and Portland, tearing the roof off of an auto repair shop and damaging many homes, with impacts ranging from minor roof, window, and siding damage to removal of roofs and walls. A manufactured home was completely swept away with the debris strewn downwind. Many outbuildings, barns, garages, silos, hog and turkey barns, and grain bins were completely destroyed with debris scattered long distances. A church was damaged, a large storage building was destroyed, and a gas plant sustained damage to its roof with a nearby trailer building destroyed. Vehicles were damaged, fences were destroyed, and farm implements and horse trailers were tossed. In Ohio, the tornado tore most of the roof off a house, while another poorly anchored house lost its roof and some exterior walls. Large barns and outbuildings in the area were completely destroyed with debris scattered up to a mile downwind. Many trees and power poles were snapped along the path. One person was injured by a flying garage door.						
EF1	NE of Clyde	Sandusky	OH	41.3723°N 82.877°W	19:18–19:20	1.34 mi (2.16 km)	50 yd (46 m)
EF1	Three homes sustained significant roof damage.						
EF2	Celina	Mercer	OH	40.5408°N 84.5732°W	19:40–19:49	5.41 mi (8.71 km)	200 yd (180 m)
EF2	This strong rain-wrapped tornado caused severe damage in Celina. Multiple businesses had their roofs torn off and windows blown out, including a Dollar General that lost its roof and sustained partial collapse of its front wall. A strip mall was damaged, with the roof of a sporting goods store collapsed. An outbuilding associated with a business was completely destroyed, and windows were blown out at a restaurant, injuring several people inside. A large factory building lost a substantial amount of roofing, and sustained collapse of multiple cinder block exterior walls. Debris from this structure was scattered throughout the area, metal light poles were downed, vehicles were damaged in parking lots, and business signs were destroyed. Homes sustained damage to roofs and siding, and many trees and power poles were snapped. Some trees landed on and damaged homes. Eight people were injured.						
EF1	ESE of Bloomingville	Erie	OH	41.3442°N 82.6965°W	19:42–19:44	1.24 mi (2.00 km)	50 yd (46 m)
EF1	Two homes were damaged, one of which was severely impacted by fallen large trees, and the second of which had its roof blown off. A small barn was damaged, and a trailer was flipped.						
EF1	Muncie	Delaware	IN	40.1991°N 85.3858°W	20:09–20:10	0.09 mi (0.14 km)	100 yd (91 m)
EF1	Several buildings in Muncie sustained roof damage as result of this brief tornado, and several trees were snapped or uprooted.						
EF2	NE of Republic	Seneca	OH	41.1777°N 82.9741°W	21:51–21:53	0.61 mi (0.98 km)	150 yd (140 m)
EF2	A couple of trees were downed. A large barn was completely destroyed, with debris scattered hundreds of yards and wrapped around trees and power lines. Several projectiles were launched into the ground.						
EF1	West Lodi	Seneca	OH	41.1653°N 82.9399°W	21:53–21:54	0.44 mi (0.71 km)	180 yd (160 m)
EF1	At least five residences in town were damaged. Storage sheds on two properties were completely destroyed, with debris launched and stuck into nearby homes. Two of these home were shifted from their foundations. Numerous trees were twisted or downed, and a corn field was flattened.						
EF2	Galion	Crawford	OH	40.7284°N 82.7968°W	22:00–22:03	1.09 mi (1.75 km)	200 yd (180 m)
EF2	Trees were snapped or broken, the roof was ripped off a home, and extensive damage occurred to warehouses and commercial buildings in town. Concrete block and masonry wall failure at was observed at some of the warehouse structures, one of which had its roof partially torn off, resulting in buckling of the steel truss.						
EF1	W of Steuben	Huron	OH	41.1033°N 82.6929°E	22:02–22:03	0.59 mi (0.95 km)	100 yd (91 m)
EF1	A pair of grain silos were damaged, with the south side of each severely bent, and the top of each silo damaged on the north side. Towers on top of the silos were toppled in different directions. A large truck nearby was overturned and landed on a trailer. A home, barn, and small grain storage container was damaged, and the latter structure was displaced and rolled several yards.						
EF1	SSW of Norwalk	Huron	OH	41.1857°N 82.6389°W	22:08–22:13	2.96 mi (4.76 km)	200 yd (180 m)
EF1	Power poles and trees were damaged or downed, a couple barns and sheds suffered roof damage, and projectiles were found embedded in the ground.						
EF0	Fitchville	Huron	OH	41.0928°N 82.5082°W	22:10–22:14	3.25 mi (5.23 km)	100 yd (91 m)
EF0	A mobile home was mostly destroyed, several trees were snapped or uprooted, and evidence of rotation was documented in corn fields. A small barn was damaged.						
EF1	SSW of Wakeman	Huron	OH	41.2116°N 82.4412°W	22:21–22:25	1.83 mi (2.95 km)	100 yd (91 m)
EF1	Roofing material was ripped from a couple of buildings and homes, and trees and power lines were damaged. One barn sustained significant roof damage, with debris scattered up to 1,200 yards away, and the upper interior portions of the structure showing fracturing in the beams. Wooden boards were lodged into the ground nearby.						
EF0	W of Nova	Ashland	OH	41.0285°N 82.3162°W	22:23–22:25	0.62 mi (1.00 km)	50 yd (46 m)
EF0	Trees were downed, an outbuilding was damaged, and two large tractor tires were moved 20 feet. A country store sustained roof damage, while a grain and feed store as well as a grain bin were also damaged.						
EF1	NW of Hayesville	Ashland	OH	40.7853°N 82.3035°W	22:29–22:33	2.04 mi (3.28 km)	100 yd (91 m)
EF1	Trees were uprooted, a gravity wagon was tossed into trees, and a home sustained significant roofing and siding damage. The home's chimney was collapsed as well. A cow was severely injured.						
EF1	S of Wooster	Wayne	OH	40.7822°N 81.9204°W	22:52–22:53	0.2 mi (0.32 km)	50 yd (46 m)
EF1	Half of the roof was ripped off of a historic homestead. Trees were snapped and uprooted in a convergent pattern.						
EF0	Erie	Erie	PA	42.085°N 80.1396°W	23:07–23:09	2.4 mi (3.9 km)	100 yd (91 m)
EF0	This tornado was embedded in a larger area of straight-line winds and affected mainly residential areas of Erie. Several homes, businesses, and a shopping plaza sustained damage. Several trees were damaged or uprooted as well.						
EF1	South Vienna	Clark, Madison	OH	39.9324°N 83.6225°W	23:16–23:25	6.62 mi (10.65 km)	200 yd (180 m)
EF1	A heavy equipment sales business in South Vienna had a hole ripped in its roof and had some siding removed. Farming equipment was moved and damaged. Numerous trees were downed, several homes sustained minor roof damage, and a garage was shifted off its foundation. A metal barn sustained collapse of exterior walls, and a semi-trailer was overturned as well.						
EF1	N of Noble	Richland	IL	38.7468°N 88.2289°W	23:24–23:33	6.84 mi (11.01 km)	50 yd (46 m)
EF1	The roof of a house, a truck, and a barn sustained damage. Several trees were downed as well.						
EF2	Williamsfield	Ashtabula	OH	41.5189°N 80.6467°W	23:51–23:57	6.7 mi (10.8 km)	200 yd (180 m)
EF2	20 homes were damaged, including a few frame homes that had roofs torn off and some exterior walls collapsed. One house was shifted off of its foundation. Multiple mobile homes were completely destroyed with the debris scattered downwind. Many large trees and tree limbs were snapped as well.						
EF1	Calcutta	Columbiana	OH	40.6809°N 80.5909°W	00:18–00:19	0.75 mi (1.21 km)	176 yd (161 m)
EF1	Several trees were downed. Rooftop cooling units at a YMCA were ripped off.						
EF0	W of Salem	Washington	IN	38.577°N 86.227°W	04:04–04:05	0.59 mi (0.95 km)	325 yd (297 m)
EF0	Large portions of maple and cedar trees were tossed onto roads. Shingle, gutter, and roof damage was inflicted to homes, and barns were damaged as well. Several toys and pumpkins were tossed, a trampoline was thrown approximately a mile, and playground toys were displaced several hundred yards.						
EF1	Salem	Washington	IN	38.6028°N 86.1021°W	04:16–04:17	0.25 mi (0.40 km)	35 yd (32 m)
EF1	The upper portion of a feed mill in downtown Salem sustained significant damage, power poles were severely bent, and a multi-business building had a large portion of its roof lifted and dropped onto a restaurant nearby, which sustained significant damage due to falling bricks. Trees were snapped, and a home sustained roof and siding damage.						
EF1	E of Salem	Washington	IN	38.6235°N 86.0221°W	04:20–04:21	0.5 mi (0.80 km)	60 yd (55 m)
EF1	Several barns, street signs, bird houses, and metal poles sustained severe damage. A 500 US gal (1,900 L) propane tank was displaced a few feet and pushed against a grain storage building. Mud and dirt splattering was observed on a grain silo.						

=== November 17 event ===
List of confirmed tornadoes – Friday, November 17, 2017
EF#	Location	County / Parish	State	Start Coord.	Time (UTC)	Path length	Max width
EF0	ENE of Iona	Bonneville	ID	43.5577°N 111.8378°W	21:25–21:35	5 mi (8.0 km)	20 yd (18 m)
EF0	A metal picnic table was destroyed.						

=== November 18 event ===
List of confirmed tornadoes – Saturday, November 18, 2017
EF#	Location	County / Parish	State	Start Coord.	Time (UTC)	Path length	Max width
EF0	NE of Dayton	Tippecanoe	IN	40.3889°N 86.7377°W	16:15–16:16	0.32 mi (0.51 km)	110 yd (100 m)
EF0	Siding was ripped from off a corner of a home, and several tree tops were downed.						
EF0	Du Quoin	Perry	IL	38.0184°N 89.2386°W	18:15–18:16	0.68 mi (1.09 km)	30 yd (27 m)
EF0	Numerous homes and businesses sustained shingle and siding damage. Hundreds of tree limbs were downed, causing damage to several vehicles. A power pole was snapped while widespread power outages were reported. A dozen mobile homes were damaged, including one untied mobile home that was shifted off its foundation.						
EF0	S of Round Knob	Massac	IL	37.2351°N 88.7367°W	19:38–19:39	0.09 mi (0.14 km)	30 yd (27 m)
EF0	A residence sustained shingle damage and had its cedar tree snapped. Limbs were broken off several other trees.						
EF1	Northern Reo	Spencer	IN	37.9096°N 87.113°W	20:38–20:41	2.38 mi (3.83 km)	300 yd (270 m)
EF1	A dozen trees were snapped or uprooted, a detached garage was blown down, and a few power poles were snapped. Around six barns or sheds experienced loss of metal roofing.						
EF1	S of Bremen	Muhlenberg	KY	37.3433°N 87.2339°W	21:02–21:05	2.82 mi (4.54 km)	300 yd (270 m)
EF1	One barn was destroyed while two others sustained minor damage and at least five more sustained minor roof or siding damage. Six homes sustained shingle loss, and dozens of trees were snapped or uprooted.						
EF1	S of Beaver Dam	Ohio	KY	37.3995°N 86.9052°W	21:20–21:22	1.99 mi (3.20 km)	60 yd (55 m)
EF1	Over a dozen small outbuildings were heavily damaged or destroyed, numerous trees were snapped or uprooted, and a post office sustained minor roof damage. Sections of roofing were lifted off homes and garages, and fences were blown inward. Several large warehouses had wood and sheet metal debris scattered. A chain link fence was flattened and insulation was ripped out of the damaged roof of a two-story home. One person was injured by a fallen tree that landed on a shed.						
EF1	N of Irvington	Meade	KY	37.9222°N 86.3086°W	21:32–21:34	1.82 mi (2.93 km)	50 yd (46 m)
EF1	A large tobacco barn was pushed 15 ft (5.0 yd), saw its roof ripped off, and had several of its walls collapsed. An anchored mobile home was rolled several times and destroyed, injuring a man inside; a garage on the property was also demolished. A house had its roof ripped off, a fence was flattened, sheet metal was ripped from an outbuilding, and numerous trees were snapped or uprooted.						
EF0	NNW of Elkton	Todd	KY	36.889°N 87.196°W	21:36–21:37	0.73 mi (1.17 km)	150 yd (140 m)
EF0	Four houses sustained partial shingle loss. A well-built porch was lifted, a brick foundation was blown out, and a grain bin was blown 30 yd (27 m) into a field and destroyed. A barn was demolished, a building had one of its walls blown out, and storm drains and shutters were ripped from a residence. Numerous trees were broken, several windows were shattered, and yard furniture was tossed.						
EF0	ENE of Slayden	Dickson	TN	36.2997°N 87.41°W	21:52–21:53	0.91 mi (1.46 km)	75 yd (69 m)
EF0	Two homes sustained minor roof damage, a travel trailer was blown onto its side, and a carport was destroyed. One barn was destroyed while two more were damaged; an outbuilding was heavily damaged by a fallen tree. Dozens of trees of snapped or uprooted.						
EF1	Joelton	Davidson	TN	36.3252°N 86.8694°W	22:31–22:32	1.14 mi (1.83 km)	200 yd (180 m)
EF1	Two homes sustained significant roof damage, outbuildings were damaged, dozens of trees were snapped and uprooted, and power poles were snapped.						
EF1	Gladeville	Davidson, Rutherford, Wilson	TN	36.0676°N 86.574°W	22:53–23:05	10.26 mi (16.51 km)	100 yd (91 m)
EF1	Dozens of trees were snapped or uprooted, several outbuildings were demolished, a few homes sustained roof damage, and a steeple was knocked off a church.						
EF1	N of Campbellsville	Taylor	KY	37.4209°N 85.3475°W	23:00–23:01	1.49 mi (2.40 km)	50 yd (46 m)
EF1	A half-dozen outbuildings were damaged or destroyed, one home sustained minor roof damage, and minor tree damage was observed.						
EF1	W of Littleville	Colbert	AL	34.588°N 87.737°W	23:01–23:04	1.71 mi (2.75 km)	200 yd (180 m)
EF1	A home sustained shingle and siding damage; the supports to its porch were blown out, and the garage was pulled away and almost completely collapsed. A barn was mostly collapsed. Numerous trees were snapped or uprooted.						
EF0	N of Hartsville	Trousdale	TN	36.410°N 86.26°W	23:04–23:10	6.9 mi (11.1 km)	125 yd (114 m)
EF0	Dozens of trees were snapped and uprooted. A few outbuildings and barns were severely damaged, and a few homes sustained some minor roof damage. This is the first confirmed November tornado on record in Trousdale County.						
EF1	N of Hatton	Lawrence	AL	34.6094°N 87.4622°W	23:18–23:24	4.33 mi (6.97 km)	300 yd (270 m)
EF1	Numerous trees were snapped or uprooted. A well-constructed barn was completely demolished. Numerous homes sustained exterior damage, including one that had the roof pulled from its carport and supports ripped from the concrete. A trailer was lofted atop a tractor. A small outbuilding collapsed, a mobile home had tin and siding peeled off, and a standalone garage port was shifted slightly off its foundation.						
EF1	Plum to Murrysville	Allegheny, Westmoreland	PA	40.4206°N 79.7277°W	05:11–05:15	5.4 mi (8.7 km)	125 yd (114 m)
EF1	A vehicle was flipped and air condenser units were moved at a senior residential community, where buildings suffered shingle and siding loss. Several homes suffered similar degrees of damage. One in particular had its door damaged, and its associated outbuilding lost its roof; a high-quality wind sensor measured a peak gust of 82 mph (132 km/h) there. Large trees were snapped and uprooted.						

=== November 22 event ===
List of confirmed tornadoes – Wednesday, November 22, 2017
EF#	Location	County / Parish	State	Start Coord.	Time (UTC)	Path length	Max width
EF0	W of Immokalee	Collier	FL	26.42°N 81.53°W	21:40	0.25 mi (0.40 km)	25 yd (23 m)
EF0	Two videos posted to social media indicated a landspout tornado.						

== December ==
Confirmed tornadoes by Enhanced Fujita rating
EFU	EF0	EF1	EF2	EF3	EF4	EF5	Total
0	3	6	3	0	0	0	12

=== December 4 event ===
List of confirmed tornadoes – Monday, December 4, 2017
EF#	Location	County / Parish	State	Start Coord.	Time (UTC)	Path length	Max width
EF1	ENE of Higbee to ENE of Renick	Randolph	MO	39.3099°N 92.493°W	22:54–23:09	10 mi (16 km)	30 yd (27 m)
EF1	A mobile home was overturned, thrown from its foundation, and destroyed; one occupant was critically injured while a second sustained lesser injury. A house built into an earthen berm was heavily damaged, and a pickup truck was blown several hundred yards into a field.						
EF2	SW of Wayland, MO to WNW of Keokuk, IA	Clark (MO), Lee (IA)	MO, IA	40.3779°N 91.6274°W	23:13–23:28	7.97 mi (12.83 km)	50 yd (46 m)
EF2	A salt shelter structure and doors were destroyed at a Department of Transportation building. Nearby wooden power poles were snapped, and trees were damaged as well. Windows were broken, and a semi-trailer was overturned, causing one injury.						
EF1	S of Brumley	Miller	MO	38.0386°N 92.4879°W	00:18–00:19	0.4 mi (0.64 km)	100 yd (91 m)
EF1	Trees, a house, and an outbuilding were damaged.						

=== December 19 event ===
List of confirmed tornadoes – Tuesday, December 19, 2017
EF#	Location	County / Parish	State	Start Coord.	Time (UTC)	Path length	Max width
EF2	SW of Rusk	Cherokee	TX	31.7435°N 95.1926°W	00:53–01:06	3.08 mi (4.96 km)	691 yd (632 m)
EF2	Concrete power poles and trees were downed, and damage to roofs and outbuildings occurred.						
EF2	NE of Reklaw	Rusk	TX	31.8934°N 94.9435°W	01:31–01:37	6.39 mi (10.28 km)	1,300 yd (1,200 m)
EF2	An unanchored single-family home was destroyed by this large wedge tornado after being lifted off its block foundation and pushed about 15 yd (14 m) into a forest. Many hardwood and pine trees were snapped or uprooted, and a fiberglass fishing boat was lofted and never found.						

=== December 20 event ===
List of confirmed tornadoes – Wednesday, December 20, 2017
EF#	Location	County / Parish	State	Start Coord.	Time (UTC)	Path length	Max width
EF1	ESE of Quitman	Jackson	LA	32.3366°N 92.6804°W	07:02–07:07	0.95 mi (1.53 km)	110 yd (100 m)
EF1	A single-wide mobile home was pushed off its foundation and several hardwood trees were snapped.						
EF1	Gist	Jasper, Newton	TX	30.2755°N 93.9484°W	07:37–07:42	4 mi (6.4 km)	250 yd (230 m)
EF1	Some barns and the roofs of a few homes were damaged in the Gist area. Many trees were downed as well.						
EF1	N of Starks	Calcasieu	LA	30.3501°N 93.7148°W	07:59–08:03	3.05 mi (4.91 km)	600 yd (550 m)
EF1	A few homes and outbuildings sustained minor damage while many trees were downed.						
EF1	DeQuincy	Calcasieu	LA	30.4354°N 93.4762°W	08:17–08:24	4.7 mi (7.6 km)	600 yd (550 m)
EF1	Several doors to hangars were damaged at a small airport in town. Numerous trees and power lines were downed, many homes and businesses sustained roof or window damage, and several automobiles were damaged. The batting cage awning at a high school was blown down, and a pavilion was destroyed at the DeQuincy Sportsplex.						
EF0	N of Tylertown	Walthall	MS	31.2834°N 90.1802°W	12:39–12:40	0.17 mi (0.27 km)	50 yd (46 m)
EF0	A mobile home was moved a few feet off its foundation and damaged. A storage shed was overturned and destroyed, and large tree branches were snapped.						
EF0	WNW of Roanoke	Randolph	AL	33.1695°N 85.4267°W	16:40–16:45	3.17 mi (5.10 km)	16 yd (15 m)
EF0	A barn had several of its roof panels blown off and tree branches were snapped; one branch fell onto an SUV. A larger extent of tree damage was found in relation to a snowstorm two weeks prior.						
EF0	N of Woodbury	Meriwether	GA	33.0245°N 84.5904°W	18:15–18:17	3.17 mi (5.10 km)	125 yd (114 m)
EF0	The tin roof was ripped from a fruit stand, many trees were snapped or uprooted, and a home sustained shingle damage. A barn was collapsed and a garage sustained roof damage.						

== See also ==
- Tornadoes of 2017
- List of United States tornadoes from August to October 2017
- List of United States tornadoes from January to March 2018
