= Old Settler's Pavilion =

- U.S. National Register of Historic Places
- Location within North Dakota Location within the United States
- Location: 116 W. B Ave. Pekin, North Dakota
- Coordinates: 47°52′13.1″N 98°21′19.7″W
- Area: less than one acre
- Built: 1920
- Built by: Alex Walquist; William Comeau
- Architectural style: Late 19th and Early 20th Century American Movements, Recreational Pavilion
- NRHP reference No.: 10000366
- Added to NRHP: June 12, 2010

The Old Settler's Pavilion near Pekin, North Dakota, in Stump Lake Park upon Stump Lake, was built in 1920. It has also been known as Stump Lake Park Pavilion.

It was listed on the National Register of Historic Places in 2010.

The historic Stump Lake pavilion, then 90 years old, was in danger of flooding in 2009 due to rising level of Stump Lake, and a proposed action to build a wall to protect it was under discussion.
