= List of United States tornadoes from January to March 2018 =

This page documents all tornadoes confirmed by various weather forecast offices of the National Weather Service in the United States from January to March 2018. Based on the 1991–2010 average, 35 tornadoes touch down in January, 29 touch down in February and 80 touch down in March. These tornadoes are commonly focused across the Southern United States due to their proximity to the unstable airmass and warm waters of the Gulf of Mexico, as well as California in association with winter storms.

A small late-January outbreak produced over a dozen tornadoes, but the month was otherwise quiet and finished below average with 15 tornadoes. A larger and more significant outbreak occurred in late-February, which pushed the month well above average with 52 tornadoes. A few sizeable outbreaks also occurred in March, but the month was still well below average with only 55 tornadoes.

== United States yearly total ==
Confirmed tornadoes by Enhanced Fujita rating
EFU	EF0	EF1	EF2	EF3	EF4	EF5	Total
15	619	399	76	12	0	0	1,121

== January ==
Confirmed tornadoes by Enhanced Fujita rating
EFU	EF0	EF1	EF2	EF3	EF4	EF5	Total
0	7	7	1	0	0	0	15

=== January 12 event ===
List of confirmed tornadoes – Friday, January 12, 2018 (Note: All dates are based on the local time zone where the tornado touched down; however, all times are in Coordinated Universal Time for consistency.)
EF#	Location	County / Parish	State	Start Coord.	Time (UTC)	Path length	Max width
EF1	ENE of Lodore	Amelia	VA	37.4463°N 78.0012°W	03:02–03:04	0.41 mi (0.66 km)	150 yd (140 m)
EF1	An attached carport was destroyed, an outbuilding had cement walls blown out, and numerous trees were uprooted.						

=== January 21 event ===
List of confirmed tornadoes – Sunday, January 21, 2018
EF#	Location	County / Parish	State	Start Coord.	Time (UTC)	Path length	Max width
EF0	E of Powell	Navarro	TX	32.1196°N 96.3186°W	00:29-00:31	1.09 mi (1.75 km)	60 yd (55 m)
EF0	Numerous large trees were damaged. A large fuel tank was tossed over 50 yd (46 m).						
EF1	Northern Huntington	Sebastian	AR	35.0823°N 94.2695°W	00:56-01:03	5.2 mi (8.4 km)	350 yd (320 m)
EF1	This tornado developed on the northwest side of town, where it uprooted trees and destroyed a metal-framed structure. The tornado moved northeast, damaging the roof of a mobile home, damaging a couple of chicken houses, and uprooting more trees before lifting.						
EF1	SE of Cecil	Franklin	AR	35.3909°N 93.9501°W	01:40-01:45	4.3 mi (6.9 km)	400 yd (370 m)
EF1	This tornado snapped the trunks of a few softwood trees, snapped large tree limbs, and damaged a home.						
EF1	SE of Hoberg	Lawrence	MO	37.0474°N 93.8293°W	02:04–02:05	1.25 mi (2.01 km)	75 yd (69 m)
EF1	Five outbuildings, an irrigation system, two ski boats, a carport, and numerous trees were destroyed. A home, a larger outbuilding, some canoes, and a pickup truck were damaged as well.						
EF0	ESE of Pickton	Hopkins	TX	33.0015°N 95.3288°W	02:19–02:20	0.25 mi (0.40 km)	50 yd (46 m)
EF0	Trained storm spotters reported a brief tornado. No damage occurred.						
EF2	Eastern De Kalb	Bowie	TX	33.4474°N 94.6484°W	03:26-03:35	7.06 mi (11.36 km)	560 yd (510 m)
EF2	This strong tornado damaged or destroyed multiple structures, including within the eastern fringes of De Kalb. A house near the beginning of the path was shifted off of its foundation, several other frame homes had large portions of their roofs ripped off, while one house had its roof ripped off entirely. Other homes were damaged to a lesser extent. Numerous large chicken houses were completely destroyed at multiple locations along the path, a camper trailer was thrown and destroyed, and a large church sustained heavy roof damage. Outbuildings were damaged, and many hardwood trees were snapped and twisted.						
EF0	N of Malta	Bowie	TX	33.5655°N 94.5114°W	03:43-03:45	0.54 mi (0.87 km)	50 yd (46 m)
EF0	A one-story home sustained roof damage, along with a church. A few trees were uprooted as well.						
EF1	SW of Foreman	Little River	AR	33.6222°N 94.4294°W	03:48-03:53	6.32 mi (10.17 km)	295 yd (270 m)
EF1	This tornado touched down at a ranch in the area, bending a fence, stripping the siding and roofing material on a large barn, and flipping two semi trailers on their side. As the tornado continued northeast, several trees were snapped and uprooted. A church lost several shingles, and several homes sustained minor roof damage. Two additional outbuildings and barns also sustained minor damage.						

=== January 22 event ===
List of confirmed tornadoes – Monday, January 22, 2018
EF#	Location	County / Parish	State	Start Coord.	Time (UTC)	Path length	Max width
EF1	E of Greenbrier	Faulkner	AR	35.1771°N 92.3648°W	06:49-06:53	2.7 mi (4.3 km)	150 yd (140 m)
EF1	Much of the damage occurred at a church and adjacent neighborhood. The church suffered extensive roof damage, as did a few homes in the neighborhood. Other damage includes the destruction of outbuildings and minor roof damage to other buildings along the path.						
EF0	SE of Labadie	Franklin	MO	38.5093°N 90.8235°W	07:12-07:13	0.18 mi (0.29 km)	25 yd (23 m)
EF0	Several trees were snapped, and debris as tossed from a harvested corn field.						
EF0	N of Kirbyville	Jasper	TX	30.76°N 93.89°W	08:10–08:11	0.5 mi (0.80 km)	10 yd (9.1 m)
EF0	One barn was destroyed while another sustained roof damage. Several treetops were twisted off.						
EF0	S of Anacoco	Vernon	LA	31.1894°N 93.3413°W	08:23–08:24	0.04 mi (0.064 km)	10 yd (9.1 m)
EF0	A tornado briefly touched down near Vernon Lake, pulling the back patio off of a home and damaging the part of the house roof it was attached to.						
EF1	S of Taylorsville	Covington, Jones	MS	31.74°N 89.48°W	15:16-15:30	7.34 mi (11.81 km)	250 yd (230 m)
EF1	This tornado uprooted and snapped several large trees and damaged a few structures, including homes. A double wide mobile home was pushed off of its foundation and 3 sheds and a barn were destroyed. One person suffered minor injuries.						

=== January 25 event ===
List of confirmed tornadoes – Thursday, January 25, 2018
EF#	Location	County / Parish	State	Start Coord.	Time (UTC)	Path length	Max width
EF0	Eureka	Humboldt	CA	40.8081°N 124.1631°W	00:40	0.04 mi (0.064 km)	30 yd (27 m)
EF0	A very narrow and weak waterspout over Humboldt Bay moved onto Woodley Island. A boat anemometer measured a 54 mph gust. On a dock, a fiberglass case was snapped before the tornado dissipated.						

== February ==
Confirmed tornadoes by Enhanced Fujita rating
EFU	EF0	EF1	EF2	EF3	EF4	EF5	Total
0	23	22	7	0	0	0	52

=== February 7 event ===
List of confirmed tornadoes – Wednesday, February 7, 2018
EF#	Location	County / Parish	State	Start Coord.	Time (UTC)	Path length	Max width
EF1	NW of Pitkin	Vernon	LA	30.96°N 93.0201°W	09:48–09:55	4.96 mi (7.98 km)	350 yd (320 m)
EF1	Numerous trees were snapped or downed, of which one caused significant damage to a house upon falling.						
EF1	S of Suqualena	Lauderdale	MS	32.3963°N 88.9137°W	10:15–10:26	7.92 mi (12.75 km)	300 yd (270 m)
EF1	Numerous trees were snapped or uprooted. Part of the roof to a metal barn was ripped off, and a large metal truss was thrown onto a nearby framed house, inflicting roof damage. Several power lines and poles were downed, a travel trailer was rolled, and a small shed was destroyed. A few other structures sustained lesser damage, and a trampoline was thrown.						
EF0	N of Ward	Sumter	AL	32.4284°N 88.2756°W	11:11–11:14	1.97 mi (3.17 km)	150 yd (140 m)
EF0	Trees were downed along the path, homes sustained roof damage, and two pieces of sheet metal were ripped off of a service station.						
EF1	S of Gallion	Marengo, Hale	AL	32.4636°N 87.7895°W	11:44–11:58	11.5 mi (18.5 km)	1,100 yd (1,000 m)
EF1	A large tree crushed the south side of a single-wide mobile home. A large farm equipment building lost its roof and walls, two mobile homes nearby sustained minor damage to their roofs and siding, and a fifth wheel RV camper was overturned and crushed by a vehicle. Trees were snapped and uprooted. At its most intense, the tornado lifted a single-wide mobile home, tearing away its roof and walls, and destroyed a metal barn. Agricultural crop sprinkler systems sustained damage, a power pole was snapped, and two road signs were damaged.						
EF0	N of Randolph	Bibb	AL	32.9484°N 86.9247°W	11:51–11:52	0.67 mi (1.08 km)	50 yd (46 m)
EF0	About 20-30 trees were snapped or uprooted. Two homes sustained roof damage.						
EF0	Jemison	Chilton	AL	32.9578°N 86.7844°W	12:03–12:06	2.49 mi (4.01 km)	300 yd (270 m)
EF0	Trees were snapped or uprooted. A church in town lost a significant portion of its metal roof, and many homes nearby also sustained roofing damage. Fallen trees inflicted significant damage to mobile homes. Carports were damaged near the end of the track.						
EF0	Bremen	Haralson	GA	33.7178°N 85.159°W	12:43–12:45	1.25 mi (2.01 km)	250 yd (230 m)
EF0	Multiple large trees were snapped or uprooted in Bremen, including one that caused substantial damage to the roof, walls, and carport of a duplex. Two nearby vehicles were damaged as well.						
EF0	S of Billingsley	Autauga	AL	32.5603°N 86.7174°W	13:04–13:08	1.97 mi (3.17 km)	150 yd (140 m)
EF0	Numerous trees were snapped or uprooted, and a single family home sustained minor siding damage.						
EF0	Nicholsville	Marengo	AL	32.0121°N 87.9099°W	13:16–13:18	0.78 mi (1.26 km)	100 yd (91 m)
EF0	Two large barns sustained significant roof damage, numerous trees were snapped or uprooted, and a metal carport was flipped.						
EF1	SSW of Franklin	Heard	GA	33.1916°N 85.2025°W	14:03–14:08	5.29 mi (8.51 km)	250 yd (230 m)
EF1	Dozens of trees were snapped or uprooted.						
EF0	Junction City	Talbot	GA	32.6038°N 84.5151°W	16:10–16:14	3.7 mi (6.0 km)	200 yd (180 m)
EF0	A small pole barn lost some of its siding. Over two dozen trees were snapped in town.						

=== February 10 event ===
List of confirmed tornadoes – Saturday, February 10, 2018
EF#	Location	County / Parish	State	Start Coord.	Time (UTC)	Path length	Max width
EF0	NNW of Philadelphia	Neshoba	MS	32.7853°N 89.133°W	22:50	0.01 mi (0.016 km)	30 yd (27 m)
EF0	The doors and some insulation were blown out of a large metal shop. Nearby trees sustained minor damage.						
EF0	W of Chatom	Washington	AL	31.4669°N 88.3843°W	23:18–23:19	0.17 mi (0.27 km)	100 yd (91 m)
EF0	A home had a window blown out and sustained damage to its metal roof.						

=== February 11 event ===
List of confirmed tornadoes – Sunday, February 11, 2018
EF#	Location	County / Parish	State	Start Coord.	Time (UTC)	Path length	Max width
EF1	N of Caryville	Holmes	FL	30.7941°N 85.8089°W	08:53-09:02	4.78 mi (7.69 km)	100 yd (91 m)
EF1	Two barns were destroyed and one brick carport that was attached to a house was destroyed. The roof of this house was mostly gone. There was one minor injury.						
EF0	S of Graceville, FL	Jackson (FL), Houston (AL)	FL, AL	30.9507°N 85.5161°W	09:28-09:48	11.21 mi (18.04 km)	25 yd (23 m)
EF0	A couple of trees were downed, and some minor roof damage occurred.						

=== February 12 event ===
List of confirmed tornadoes – Monday, February 12, 2018
EF#	Location	County / Parish	State	Start Coord.	Time (UTC)	Path length	Max width
EF0	SE of Sanger	Fresno	CA	36.6685°N 119.5134°W	19:30–19:32	0.3 mi (0.48 km)	20 yd (18 m)
EF0	A landspout was observed in rural farmland and captured on video. No damage occurred.						

=== February 15 event ===
List of confirmed tornadoes – Thursday, February 15, 2018
EF#	Location	County / Parish	State	Start Coord.	Time (UTC)	Path length	Max width
EF1	Uniontown	Fayette	PA	39.9087°N 79.7274°W	23:43–23:44	1.74 mi (2.80 km)	440 yd (400 m)
EF1	Several buildings lost some or all of their roofs, including a four-level senior living building. Numerous power lines were downed, a carport was destroyed, and several homes sustained roof damage. Numerous trees were snapped or uprooted. This was the first February tornado in NWS Pittsburgh's area of responsibility going back to 1950.						

=== February 20 event ===
List of confirmed tornadoes – Tuesday, February 20, 2018
EF#	Location	County / Parish	State	Start Coord.	Time (UTC)	Path length	Max width
EF0	W of Joshua	Johnson	TX	32.4585°N 97.4475°W	09:40-09:42	0.65 mi (1.05 km)	50 yd (46 m)
EF0	This small tornado damaged several manufactured homes and destroyed at least two. Several other homes suffered minor roof damage. Two people were injured.						
EF0	E of Joshua	Johnson	TX	32.4566°N 97.3499°W	09:53	0.25 mi (0.40 km)	40 yd (37 m)
EF0	One home suffered major roof damage, while several vehicles and trees were damaged by this narrow tornado.						
EF0	SW of DeSoto	Dallas	TX	32.5818°N 96.8718°W	10:38-10:39	0.19 mi (0.31 km)	50 yd (46 m)
EF0	This small tornado damaged several homes, including one that lost a garage roof.						

=== February 24 event ===
List of confirmed tornadoes – Saturday, February 24, 2018
EF#	Location	County / Parish	State	Start Coord.	Time (UTC)	Path length	Max width
EF2	S of Keysburg to NE of Adairville	Robertson (TN), Logan (KY)	TN, KY	36.6392°N 87.0126°W	21:53–22:12	12.88 mi (20.73 km)	350 yd (320 m)
EF2	1 death - This high-end EF2 touched down just south of the Tennessee/Kentucky state line, tearing the roof off of a hay barn and damaging a well-built stone house, which sustained heavy roof damage and had windows blown out. Two nearby pole barns were destroyed, a pickup truck on the property was tossed 40 yards, and headstones were blown over at a family cemetery, one of which was broken. The tornado crossed into Kentucky and destroyed a one-story frame home, which was left with only a few walls standing. A pickup truck was tossed 250 yards into a field, and structural debris was scattered hundreds of yards downwind. Farther along the path, another one-story home sustained roof and exterior wall loss, and an elderly woman was killed inside. Debris was scattered 500 yards away, heavy farming equipment was moved, and two barns were destroyed nearby. A two-story home in this area sustained partial destruction of its second floor, and three metal silos were destroyed. Several other homes sustained less severe damage to roofs, windows, and siding before the tornado dissipated. Many trees, fences, and power lines were downed along the path, and one other person was injured.						
EF0	ENE of Beedeville	Jackson	AR	35.4534°N 91.0543°W	23:11–23:12	0.21 mi (0.34 km)	50 yd (46 m)
EF0	Two outbuildings were uplifted while a tree fell on a third. A metal beam from one of the outbuildings smashed the cab of a tractor. A few trees were snapped.						
EF1	SSW of Hays	Warren, Barren	KY	37.0186°N 86.1459°W	23:19–23:21	1.92 mi (3.09 km)	50 yd (46 m)
EF1	A small metal shed was destroyed, a trailer was overturned, and a fence was flattened. Several outbuildings were demolished, a few homes sustained roof, garage, and porch damage, and many trees were snapped or uprooted.						
EF1	W of Cherry Valley	Cross	AR	35.3999°N 90.8666°W	23:20–23:24	3.23 mi (5.20 km)	75 yd (69 m)
EF1	A home had a large portion of its roof removed, a single-wide trailer was pushed off its foundation., and tree limbs were downed. A few farm outbuildings and one grain bin suffered minor damage.						
EF2	SW of Knobel, AR to Malden, MO	Clay, Dunklin (MO), New Madrid (MO)	AR, MO	36.3001°N 90.6333°W	23:21–00:07	41.93 mi (67.48 km)	150 yd (140 m)
EF2	1 death - This strong and long-tracked, but intermittent tornado first touched down near Knobel, killing one person when a mobile home was thrown into a pond. The tornado entered Missouri and struck the town of Malden before dissipating, where significant damage and five injuries occurred. 66 homes in Malden were damaged, some of which had their roofs torn off or sustained major structural damage. Mobile homes and outbuildings were destroyed, and trees in town were snapped and uprooted as well.						
EF2	Keiser to NW of Osceola	Mississippi	AR	35.64°N 90.14°W	00:06–00:15	9.92 mi (15.96 km)	100 yd (91 m)
EF2	This strong tornado began southwest of Keiser and moved northeast into the city, damaging several buildings with roof sections torn off, windows blown out, and a few structures suffering partial to complete roof loss. Blown transformers and numerous downed trees were reported across the community. The tornado then moved through open fields and crossed I-55, where it caused considerable damage to a hotel. Additional structural damage occurred at a nearby metal building facility before the tornado continued northeast across farmland and eventually lifted. In February 2026, this tornado's rating was upgraded from EF1 to EF2 by NWS Memphis. The tornado's width and path length was also increased.						
EF2	Southeastern Matthews	New Madrid	MO	36.7508°N 89.5846°W	00:30–00:32	0.95 mi (1.53 km)	150 yd (140 m)
EF2	This brief but damaging tornado touched down in the town of Matthews, where dozens of homes had their roofs partially or completely ripped off. Semi-trucks were blown over and destroyed, trees were snapped and uprooted, and several other structures were damaged or destroyed. Two people were injured.						
EF0	NW of Troy	Obion	TN	36.3753°N 89.2938°W	00:51–00:58	5.59 mi (9.00 km)	75 yd (69 m)
EF0	A few trees were downed and a few outbuildings were damaged.						
EF1	E of Union City	Obion	TN	36.4167°N 89.0012°W	01:07–01:10	3.18 mi (5.12 km)	450 yd (410 m)
EF1	A broad and disorganized tornadic circulation destroyed several mobile homes and inflicted roof damage to a number of houses. Three people were injured.						
EF0	N of Trenton	Gibson	TN	36.0043°N 88.9915°W	01:17–01:22	4.25 mi (6.84 km)	75 yd (69 m)
EF0	Trees were knocked down.						
EF0	NE of Martin	Weakley	TN	36.4106°N 88.7895°W	01:21–01:26	5.15 mi (8.29 km)	75 yd (69 m)
EF0	Trees were knocked down and a few outbuildings were damaged.						
EF0	SE of Dresden	Weakley	TN	36.2266°N 88.6918°W	01:36–01:43	7.38 mi (11.88 km)	75 yd (69 m)
EF0	Trees were knocked down.						
EF1	W of Murray	Graves, Calloway	KY	36.5163°N 88.5217°W	01:37–01:46	8.29 mi (13.34 km)	125 yd (114 m)
EF1	Over a half dozen barns were damaged or destroyed, including one that was well-built and newly-constructed. Two empty grain bins were blown over, several homes were damaged by flying debris and falling trees, and two semi-trailers were overturned. Two mobile homes were blown from their foundations as well. Dozens of trees were snapped or uprooted.						
EF1	SE of Lone Oak	McCracken	KY	36.9898°N 88.6588°W	01:37–01:41	1.93 mi (3.11 km)	100 yd (91 m)
EF1	A barn was destroyed; debris from the structure was embedded into a small trailer and damaged a nearby house. Another outbuilding was destroyed, the roofs of two homes were damaged, and a garage between the two residences had its window broken and west side pushed outward. Numerous trees were snapped or uprooted.						
EF1	NW of Golo	Graves	KY	36.7458°N 88.5415°W	01:42–01:43	1.17 mi (1.88 km)	100 yd (91 m)
EF1	A few homes sustained roof damage. A mobile home was lifted and rolled down a hill, a small outbuilding was destroyed, and several large trees were snapped or uprooted.						
EF1	Southern Murray	Calloway	KY	36.5972°N 88.3223°W	01:50–01:52	1.41 mi (2.27 km)	100 yd (91 m)
EF1	Over 40 homes were damaged in town, including two that had their roof decking removed, windows blown out, and portions of their exterior walls caved in due to flying debris. At least four businesses sustained damage; one had most of its roof ripped off. Dozens of trees were snapped or uprooted.						
EF1	NE of Paris	Henry	TN	36.3321°N 88.2714°W	02:02–02:07	3.85 mi (6.20 km)	75 yd (69 m)
EF1	Trees and power poles were downed.						
EF0	NNE of Hopkinsville	Christian	KY	36.9203°N 87.4783°W	02:44–02:50	5.31 mi (8.55 km)	75 yd (69 m)
EF0	At least four barns sustained partial loss of roof and siding. A camper trailer was overturned and hundreds of trees were snapped or uprooted.						
EF2	Southeastern Hopkinsville	Christian	KY	36.8315°N 87.4835°W	02:45–02:51	5.39 mi (8.67 km)	200 yd (180 m)
EF2	Three apartment buildings in Hopkinsville had their roofs ripped off and most second-story exterior walls collapsed by this high-end EF2 tornado. Another apartment building was heavily damaged and three cars in this area were tossed, one of which was found 100 feet away. Four retail buildings sustained major roof and siding damage, and had most windows and doors blown in. Four homes sustained roof damage, and two large commercial buildings were damaged as well. One of the commercial buildings sustained major roof and wall failure. Hundreds of trees were snapped or uprooted, four barns were damaged or destroyed, and nine people were injured. All injuries took place at the apartment buildings.						
EF1	SW of Clarksville	Montgomery	TN	36.4848°N 87.4709°W	02:50–02:57	5.31 mi (8.55 km)	150 yd (140 m)
EF1	Nearly two dozen homes were damaged to varying degrees while hundreds of trees were snapped or uprooted.						
EF0	NE of Hopkinsville	Christian	KY	36.9507°N 87.3028°W	02:55–02:56	0.47 mi (0.76 km)	50 yd (46 m)
EF0	Two garages and farm buildings sustained minor roof damage and a few tree limbs were snapped.						
EF2	Eastern Clarksville	Montgomery	TN	36.5513°N 87.2707°W	03:03–03:08	4.07 mi (6.55 km)	200 yd (180 m)
EF2	A strong tornado touched down on the eastern side of Clarksville, damaging many structures and trees. Several outbuildings were destroyed at a local high school football field, while at an industrial complex, 75 cars and 3 buildings sustained damage. The roofs of four duplexes were torn off, and several others were damaged. Some of the most intense damage occurred in the Farmington subdivision, where multiple homes had their roofs ripped off and a few had some exterior wall failure. One home in this area was shifted off of its foundation and leveled, though the structure was poorly anchored and overall context was not consistent with a tornado exceeding EF2 in intensity. Two people were injured.						
EF0	N of Lewisburg	Logan	KY	37.0192°N 86.9743°W	03:15–03:16	2.93 mi (4.72 km)	300 yd (270 m)
EF0	Several homes experienced roof and siding damage. Over 100 trees were snapped, twisted, or uprooted.						
EF1	ENE of Adams	Robertson	TN	36.5864°N 87.0404°W	03:19–03:24	3.59 mi (5.78 km)	150 yd (140 m)
EF1	A home sustained minor roof damage and dozens of trees were snapped or uprooted. Several barns and outbuildings were damaged or destroyed, and corn from a farm was scattered over a quarter-mile away.						
EF1	N of Quality	Butler	KY	37.086°N 86.873°W	03:21–03:24	1.4 mi (2.3 km)	100 yd (91 m)
EF1	Many trees were twisted, snapped or uprooted. A large barn suffered significant damage. A thorough storm damage survey was challenged due to floodwaters and downed trees.						
EF0	S of Franklin	Simpson	KY	36.67°N 86.59°W	03:50–03:52	1.68 mi (2.70 km)	100 yd (91 m)
EF0	One large barn suffered extensive roof panel damage while a second had its metal sheeting tossed in various directions. Several trees were snapped or uprooted.						
EF2	Grab	Green	KY	37.2332°N 85.624°W	04:33–04:35	1.3 mi (2.1 km)	100 yd (91 m)
EF2	This low-end EF2 caused roof damage to two barns, completely destroyed two other barns, and snapped large trees. A detached garage had its doors bowed outward and a two-story house had its roof damaged. A porch column at this home was ripped off and thrown 50 yards into a field. A carport was tossed 100 yards over a house as well.						
EF1	W of Felicity	Clermont	OH	38.8269°N 84.1748°W	05:03–05:06	3.5 mi (5.6 km)	200 yd (180 m)
EF1	Many trees were snapped or uprooted. A mobile home was destroyed and a few structures sustained roof damage, including two barns with partial roof removal. Debris from a damaged structure was blown against a fence line.						
EF1	NE of Hamersville	Brown	OH	38.9237°N 83.9639°W	05:13–05:18	4.9 mi (7.9 km)	300 yd (270 m)
EF1	A well-built home suffered partial roof loss, a trailer was flipped, and a mobile home had its roof completely removed. Trees were snapped or uprooted.						
EF1	WNW of Paint Lick	Garrard	KY	37.624°N 84.47°W	05:50–05:51	0.1 mi (0.16 km)	100 yd (91 m)
EF1	A small shed was shifted off its foundation into a fence. A nearby home had its roof covering ripped off and sustained impacts from flying debris. Another outbuilding was overturned and slid some distance. A brick veneer house lost part of its outer wall and some roofing, with a few of its front porch columns blown over. An adjoining garage lost its roof and had its doors bent inward, which then fell onto the vehicles inside. A barn behind the house collapsed and another outbuilding was also destroyed.						

=== February 28 event ===
List of confirmed tornadoes – Wednesday, February 28, 2018
EF#	Location	County / Parish	State	Start Coord.	Time (UTC)	Path length	Max width
EF0	SE of Eva	Cullman	AL	34.2948°N 86.7239°W	22:46-22:48	1.34 mi (2.16 km)	100 yd (91 m)
EF0	One home sustained shingle and gutter damage while a second had its porch damaged when its roof was uplifted. Two large barns sustained significant roof damage, and several trees were snapped or uprooted.						

== March ==
Confirmed tornadoes by Enhanced Fujita rating
EFU	EF0	EF1	EF2	EF3	EF4	EF5	Total
0	26	23	5	1	0	0	55

=== March 3 event ===
List of confirmed tornadoes – Saturday, March 3, 2018
EF#	Location	County / Parish	State	Start Coord.	Time (UTC)	Path length	Max width
EF0	NNW of Bishop	Inyo	CA	37.402°N 118.395°W	21:02–21:10	0.1 mi (0.16 km)	10 yd (9.1 m)
EF0	Multiple members of the public reported a landspout tornado.						

=== March 5 event ===
List of confirmed tornadoes – Monday, March 5, 2018
EF#	Location	County / Parish	State	Start Coord.	Time (UTC)	Path length	Max width
EF1	NW of Tallulah	Madison	LA	32.4987°N 91.257°W	00:07–00:11	1.77 mi (2.85 km)	120 yd (110 m)
EF1	Some trees were damaged and uprooted, a metal tractor barn was leveled, and an old home was damaged. A small wood shed was overturned while a flat bed trailer was rolled over.						
EF0	NW of Edwards	Warren	MS	32.4208°N 90.7325°W	01:11–01:12	2 mi (3.2 km)	50 yd (46 m)
EF0	Several trees were uprooted and a few large tree limbs were snapped.						

=== March 11 event ===
List of confirmed tornadoes – Sunday, March 11, 2018
EF#	Location	County / Parish	State	Start Coord.	Time (UTC)	Path length	Max width
EF1	Bentonia	Yazoo	MS	32.6555°N 90.3754°W	07:37–07:42	1.48 mi (2.38 km)	200 yd (180 m)
EF1	Several large trees were uprooted, several homes were damaged, and an old school building in Bentonia sustained considerable roof damage. Some power lines were downed as well.						
EF0	NE of Flora	Madison	MS	32.5996°N 90.2667°W	07:49–07:57	6.11 mi (9.83 km)	150 yd (140 m)
EF0	Minor tree damage was observed.						
EF2	SE of Echo	Avoyelles	LA	31.1011°N 92.2172°W	13:10–13:12	0.39 mi (0.63 km)	50 yd (46 m)
EF2	A tied down double-wide mobile home was flipped and destroyed, injuring four occupants. Several trees were snapped or uprooted, and an open air garage had part of its metal roof ripped off.						

=== March 17 event ===
List of confirmed tornadoes – Saturday, March 17, 2018
EF#	Location	County / Parish	State	Start Coord.	Time (UTC)	Path length	Max width
EF0	NNE of Etowah	McMinn	TN	35.3738°N 84.5758°W	23:23–23:24	0.38 mi (0.61 km)	100 yd (91 m)
EF0	Many softwood trees were snapped or uprooted.						
EF0	S of Tellico Plains	Monroe	TN	35.2963°N 84.3049°W	23:49–23:56	1.2 mi (1.9 km)	200 yd (180 m)
EF0	Many trees were uprooted, fences were damaged, and a barn was destroyed. A few structures sustained minor damage, windows were broken, and a mobile home was shifted off of its foundation.						
EF0	E of Murphy	Cherokee	NC	35.0946°N 83.9271°W	00:17–00:18	0.63 mi (1.01 km)	100 yd (91 m)
EF0	Extensive tree damage was observed. Homes, barns, and a business sustained structural damage. A trailer was overturned.						
EF0	NW of Hayesville	Clay	NC	35.0759°N 83.8679°W	00:32–00:39	1.51 mi (2.43 km)	120 yd (110 m)
EF0	Many trees were snapped or uprooted, some of which fell on homes and vehicles.						
EF1	N of Helen	White	GA	34.7903°N 83.784°W	01:31–01:36	5.06 mi (8.14 km)	630 yd (580 m)
EF1	This tornado snapped or uprooted approximately 1,000 trees along its path. Numerous trees were downed at an RV resort, damaging or destroying four buildings and an unoccupied RV upon falling.						

=== March 18 event ===
List of confirmed tornadoes – Sunday, March 18, 2018
EF#	Location	County / Parish	State	Start Coord.	Time (UTC)	Path length	Max width	Summary
EF0	S of Spearman	Hansford	TX	36.13°N 101.19°W	00:29–00:34	0.06 mi (0.097 km)	25 yd (23 m)	A landspout tornado was photographed multiple times.
EF1	N of Glazier	Hemphill	TX	36.0248°N 100.2995°W	02:14–02:24	6.03 mi (9.70 km)	70 yd (64 m)	A tornado caused damage to trees, powerlines, and an outbuilding.

=== March 19 event ===
List of confirmed tornadoes – Monday, March 19, 2018
EF#	Location	County / Parish	State	Start Coord.	Time (UTC)	Path length	Max width	Summary
EF0	E of Belmont	Tishomingo	MS	34.5051°N 88.2099°W	21:53–21:54	0.82 mi (1.32 km)	125 yd (114 m)	A home and two apartments suffered minor roof damage. Several large trees were uprooted, and a fence was blown over.
EF0	S of Cherokee	Colbert	AL	34.6291°N 87.9681°W	22:05–22:15	3.9 mi (6.3 km)	120 yd (110 m)	Several large trees were snapped or uprooted.
EF1	W of Russellville	Franklin	AL	34.5107°N 87.8727°W	22:10–22:16	1.21 mi (1.95 km)	100 yd (91 m)	Brief tornado near Cedar Creek Lake caused roof, window, and siding damage to a mobile home and three frame homes. A barn and a covered boat slip were destroyed, and many trees were knocked down along the path.
EF1	Southern Russellville	Franklin	AL	34.4988°N 87.7476°W	22:21–22:30	2.05 mi (3.30 km)	200 yd (180 m)	Numerous homes in the southern part of Russellville sustained varying degrees of roof and siding damage as a result of this rain-wrapped tornado, with one house also losing its chimney. In addition, a barn was destroyed, a Waffle House sustained roof and sign damage, and a metal warehouse building and apartment complex sustained minor structural damage. Numerous trees were downed as well.
EF0	Mount Hope	Lawrence	AL	34.4535°N 87.4978°W	22:54–22:56	1.16 mi (1.87 km)	250 yd (230 m)	On a farm, several small fertilizer containers were blown over; one was tossed over 1,000 yd (910 m). At Mount Hope School, bleachers were dragged and sustained minor damage. Trees were uprooted and branches were snapped along the path.
EF2	SW of Lester to ESE of Ardmore	Limestone	AL	34.9572°N 87.2049°W	23:08–23:46	23.54 mi (37.88 km)	600 yd (550 m)	Multiple-vortex tornado moved through areas just south of the Tennessee state line, causing heavy roof damage to numerous site-built homes and manufactured homes, two of which lost most of their roofs and roofing structures. Several small sheds and barns were damaged or destroyed, and hundreds of trees were downed along the path.
EF1	W of Aldridge Grove to E of Speake	Lawrence	AL	34.4235°N 87.2526°W	23:16–23:22	6.8 mi (10.9 km)	100 yd (91 m)	In the Aldridge Grove area, numerous trees were snapped and a church sustained roof damage. Additional trees were snapped and minor structural damage occurred in small community of Speake before the tornado dissipated.
EF1	SW of Hartselle to SE of Falkville	Morgan, Cullman	AL	34.3675°N 87.0404°W	23:29–23:54	14 mi (23 km)	550 yd (500 m)	A few small farm buildings and sheds were either heavily damaged or destroyed, and many trees were downed.
EF1	SE of Francisco	Jackson	AL	34.9682°N 86.2307°W	23:30–23:36	0.53 mi (0.85 km)	200 yd (180 m)	An extensive swath of trees was downed or uprooted.
EF1	NW of Hazel Green	Madison	AL	34.9631°N 86.6509°W	23:58–00:04	4.8 mi (7.7 km)	150 yd (140 m)	Rain-wrapped tornado hit a building supply yard, removing metal roofing and siding from a building, leaving the wooden support structure broken and scattering the roofing into a nearby field. Additionally, a house had about a quarter of its shingles removed and a few sheds and farm outbuildings were heavily damaged. More homes sustained roof damage, either directly from winds or by falling trees.
EF0	N of Summit	Blount	AL	34.2299°N 86.4949°W	00:09–00:11	0.94 mi (1.51 km)	100 yd (91 m)	Sections of metal roofing were blown off four chicken houses. Some small trees were snapped and branches were broken.
EF2	NNE of Douglas to SSW of Albertville	Marshall	AL	34.2216°N 86.2939°W	00:26–00:41	3.76 mi (6.05 km)	690 yd (630 m)	Low-end EF2 tornado destroyed a barn and two sets of chicken houses, and also damaged a third set of chicken houses and another farm building. Many trees were downed along the path.
EF0	NE of Decherd	Franklin	TN	35.2257°N 86.0669°W	00:50–00:55	3.68 mi (5.92 km)	150 yd (140 m)	A few trees were slightly uprooted or had their branches snapped.
EF1	NW of Ashville	Blount, St. Clair	AL	33.8515°N 86.4152°W	00:52–00:56	6.38 mi (10.27 km)	880 yd (800 m)	Dozens of trees were downed, many of which fell on structures and power lines. A house had a small part of its roof torn off as well.
EF2	NE of Ashville to NE of Ohatchee	St. Clair, Etowah, Calhoun	AL	33.8552°N 86.2398°W	01:02–01:23	15.68 mi (25.23 km)	2,000 yd (1,800 m)	A high-end EF2 wedge tornado moved a home off of its foundation and completely removed its roof. Several other homes suffered roof and exterior wall loss near Southside. Numerous trees were snapped off near their bases, some of which fell on and damaged structures. One person was injured.
EF1	SE of Centre	Cherokee	AL	34.1095°N 85.6522°W	01:20–01:22	1.07 mi (1.72 km)	400 yd (370 m)	A home sustained damage to its garage door. Several pine trees were snapped. Several apartment buildings lost their shingles, and a farm outbuilding was completely destroyed, with its metal panels scattered 300 yd (270 m) away.
EF3	NW of Wellington, AL to Jacksonville, AL to NW of Bremen, GA	Calhoun (AL), Cleburne (AL), Haralson (GA)	AL, GA	33.8453°N 85.9472°W	01:23–02:14	34.99 mi (56.31 km)	2,175 yd (1,989 m)	Near Wellington, a few homes were damaged and a metal truss tower was downed by this destructive, long-tracked wedge tornado. The tornado then caused major structural damage to several homes and destroyed the sanctuary of a large brick church building before entering Jacksonville and striking Jacksonville State University. The Pete Mathews Coliseum lost much of its roof, light poles were downed at the baseball field, and large brick structures on campus had their roofs torn off. Several apartment complexes near the campus sustained EF3 damage, with buildings sustaining partial to total destruction of their top floors. Numerous vehicles were thrown from parking lots and damaged, a convenience store was badly damaged, and a Dollar General sustained roof loss and partial collapse of its front exterior wall. Homes in residential areas were also damaged, some of which lost their roofs. Past Jacksonville, the tornado reached its maximum intensity, snapping hundreds of trees and causing major damage to homes and mobile homes on Choccolocco Mountain and in Nances Creek. One home in this area was left with only one wall standing, and large hay bales were thrown 300 yards. Farther along the path, the tornado passed near Fruithurst and Muscadine before crossing into Georgia and dissipating near Bremen. Damage along this final segment of the path was limited to downed trees, some of which landed on structures. Four people were injured.
EF0	W of Weaver	Calhoun	AL	33.7502°N 85.8464°W	02:07–02:10	0.82 mi (1.32 km)	138 yd (126 m)	On the north side of Finks Lake, one home sustained notable roof damage while a second had a few shingles ripped off. Passing across the lake, a small boat dock had a portion of its roof peeled back, a camper was flipped, and a horse trailer was blown onto its side. Trees were snapped or uprooted.
EF1	Western Buchanan	Haralson	GA	33.8115°N 85.1924°W	02:25–02:27	1.39 mi (2.24 km)	500 yd (460 m)	Numerous large trees were snapped or uprooted in the western part of town, one of which fell on a home and caused serious injuries to two occupants.
EF2	NW of Fairburn	Fulton	GA	33.6226°N 84.6252°W	03:11–03:14	0.53 mi (0.85 km)	315 yd (288 m)	Brief but strong tornado struck the Chestnut Ridge subdivision in South Fulton. At least 50 homes were damaged at this location, about half of which sustained significant damage. In one area, several homes had large sections of their roofs and second floor exterior walls removed. Outside the subdivision, a few other homes had roof and siding damage, and large trees were snapped and uprooted.

=== March 21 event ===
List of confirmed tornadoes – Wednesday, March 21, 2018
EF#	Location	County / Parish	State	Start Coord.	Time (UTC)	Path length	Max width
EF0	E of Arboga	Yuba	CA	39.03°N 121.52°W	01:40–01:45	1 mi (1.6 km)	30 yd (27 m)
EF0	Tarps were ripped and objects were knocked over by a weak tornado.						

=== March 22 event ===
List of confirmed tornadoes – Thursday, March 22, 2018
EF#	Location	County / Parish	State	Start Coord.	Time (UTC)	Path length	Max width
EF0	ESE of Dinuba	Tulare	CA	36.4864°N 119.2519°W	22:49–22:50	1.19 mi (1.92 km)	20 yd (18 m)
EF0	A brief tornado was photographed.						

=== March 27 event ===
List of confirmed tornadoes – Tuesday, March 27, 2018
EF#	Location	County / Parish	State	Start Coord.	Time (UTC)	Path length	Max width
EF0	NE of Bonanza	Sebastian	AR	35.2704°N 94.4168°W	14:43–14:45	2 mi (3.2 km)	350 yd (320 m)
EF0	Several barns were damaged or destroyed, and numerous large tree limbs were snapped.						
EF0	NNE of Needmore	Terry	TX	33.3387°N 102.3238°W	21:49–21:51	0.11 mi (0.18 km)	20 yd (18 m)
EF0	A landspout tornado was videoed over an open field.						

=== March 28 event ===
List of confirmed tornadoes – Wednesday, March 28, 2018
EF#	Location	County / Parish	State	Start Coord.	Time (UTC)	Path length	Max width
EF0	NE of Luling	Caldwell	TX	29.7624°N 97.5736°W	09:57–09:59	1.2 mi (1.9 km)	50 yd (46 m)
EF0	A few trees and roofs sustained minor damage.						
EF1	NE of Natchitoches to WSW of Calvin	Natchitoches, Winn	LA	31.8059°N 93.0195°W	20:06–20:22	15.98 mi (25.72 km)	1,200 yd (1,100 m)
EF1	A large tornado downed or uprooted numerous trees, and several homes were damaged by fallen trees.						
EF1	NE of Columbia	Caldwell, Richland	LA	32.1779°N 91.9954°W	21:47–21:51	2.82 mi (4.54 km)	400 yd (370 m)
EF1	Tin from a shed was blown across a river, a fence was flattened, multiple trees were snapped or uprooted, and a mobile home sustained damage to its deck and skirting. Houses, sheds, and campers were damaged by fallen trees.						
EF1	S of Mangham	Richland, Franklin	LA	32.2616°N 91.8191°W	22:01–22:05	5.34 mi (8.59 km)	650 yd (590 m)
EF1	An irrigation pivot was overturned. A mobile home was flipped onto a vehicle, injuring the four occupants inside the home.Two more mobile homes, two more houses, and a shed sustained damage. Numerous trees were snapped along the path.						
EF1	ENE of Mangham	Franklin	LA	32.3175°N 91.7176°W	22:08–22:12	3.86 mi (6.21 km)	400 yd (370 m)
EF1	An irrigation pivot was overturned, several sheds were damaged or destroyed, several trees were snapped or uprooted, and a home sustained roof damage.						
EF1	E of West	Attala	MS	33.1905°N 89.7622°W	01:03–01:06	1.87 mi (3.01 km)	50 yd (46 m)
EF1	Numerous hardwood trees were uprooted.						
EF1	WNW of Ackerman	Choctaw	MS	33.3222°N 89.4124°W	01:28–01:38	8.51 mi (13.70 km)	800 yd (730 m)
EF1	Numerous trees were snapped or uprooted.						
EF0	WNW of Flowood	Hinds	MS	32.3334°N 90.1547°W	01:58–01:59	0.75 mi (1.21 km)	25 yd (23 m)
EF0	Several trees were topped or uprooted, and a professional building sustained damage to its window awnings.						
EF0	N of Brandon	Rankin	MS	32.3467°N 90.01°W	02:12–02:16	1.64 mi (2.64 km)	50 yd (46 m)
EF0	A couple of trees were snapped or downed. A trampoline was tossed into nearby trees.						

=== March 29 event ===
List of confirmed tornadoes – Thursday, March 29, 2018
EF#	Location	County / Parish	State	Start Coord.	Time (UTC)	Path length	Max width
EF0	Woodsboro	Refugio	TX	28.24°N 97.33°W	05:56–05:57	0.92 mi (1.48 km)	75 yd (69 m)
EF0	This tornado struck Woodsboro and damaged the ladder to a grain bin, downed power lines, and damaged the roofs of several homes in town. One mobile home had its roof completely removed. Minor tree damage occurred as well.						
EF0	Holiday Beach	Aransas	TX	28.1670°N 97.0177°W	06:25–06:26	0.1 mi (0.16 km)	30 yd (27 m)
EF0	A house had its roof blown off, and the resultant debris was blown into another home across the street as a result of this very brief and small tornado. Several power poles were snapped as well.						
EF1	Seadrift	Calhoun	TX	28.4186°N 96.7174°W	06:39–06:40	0.4 mi (0.64 km)	150 yd (140 m)
EF1	Several mobile homes in Seadrift were flipped and one was completely destroyed. A truck and a boat were capsized, several residences sustained roof damage, and several outbuildings were damaged or destroyed. One person was injured.						
EF0	Iowa Colony	Brazoria	TX	29.406°N 95.4343°W	07:16–07:17	0.02 mi (0.032 km)	20 yd (18 m)
EF0	A fence was broken while trees and vegetation sustained minimal damage as a result of this very brief, small tornado.						
EF0	NNW of Vinton	Calcasieu	LA	30.2384°N 93.5991°W	09:21–09:23	0.88 mi (1.42 km)	150 yd (140 m)
EF0	A tornado damaged a shed and some trees.						
EF1	N of Gillis	Calcasieu	LA	30.3839°N 93.2834°W	09:36–09:46	6.35 mi (10.22 km)	800 yd (730 m)
EF1	Wooden high tension transmission line poles were topped. A barn was damaged, and a house was damaged by fallen trees.						
EF1	NNE of Moss Bluff	Calcasieu	LA	30.3191°N 93.1951°W	09:47–09:49	1.89 mi (3.04 km)	425 yd (389 m)
EF1	Many power lines and trees were downed. Several homes were damaged by fallen trees. A cinder block shed was damaged, a fence was flattened, and several homes also sustained minor roof damage.						
EF1	NE of Kinder	Allen	LA	30.5473°N 92.8405°W	10:14–10:18	4.44 mi (7.15 km)	900 yd (820 m)
EF1	A few campers and small mobile homes were damaged, one of which was flipped. Several homes were damaged by tornadic winds or fallen trees. A shed and a carport were destroyed, a motel sustained partial removal of its tin roof, and trees were damaged.						

=== March 31 event ===
List of confirmed tornadoes – Saturday, March 31, 2018
EF#	Location	County / Parish	State	Start Coord.	Time (UTC)	Path length	Max width
EF0	SE of Pahokee	Palm Beach	FL	26.7893°N 80.6356°W	19:00–19:03	0.5 mi (0.80 km)	25 yd (23 m)
EF0	A trained storm spotter reported a tornado over an open field.						

== See also ==
- List of United States tornadoes from November to December 2017
- Tornadoes of 2018
- List of United States tornadoes in April 2018
