= Stump Lake (North Dakota) =

Lake in the state of North Dakota, United States

- Location within North Dakota
- Location: Nelson County, North Dakota
- Coordinates: 47°53′42″N 98°22′26″W
- Type: lake
- Basin countries: United States
- Surface area: 15,742.4 acres (6,370.7 ha)
- Average depth: 29.7 ft (9.1 m)
- Max. depth: 73.3 ft (22.3 m)

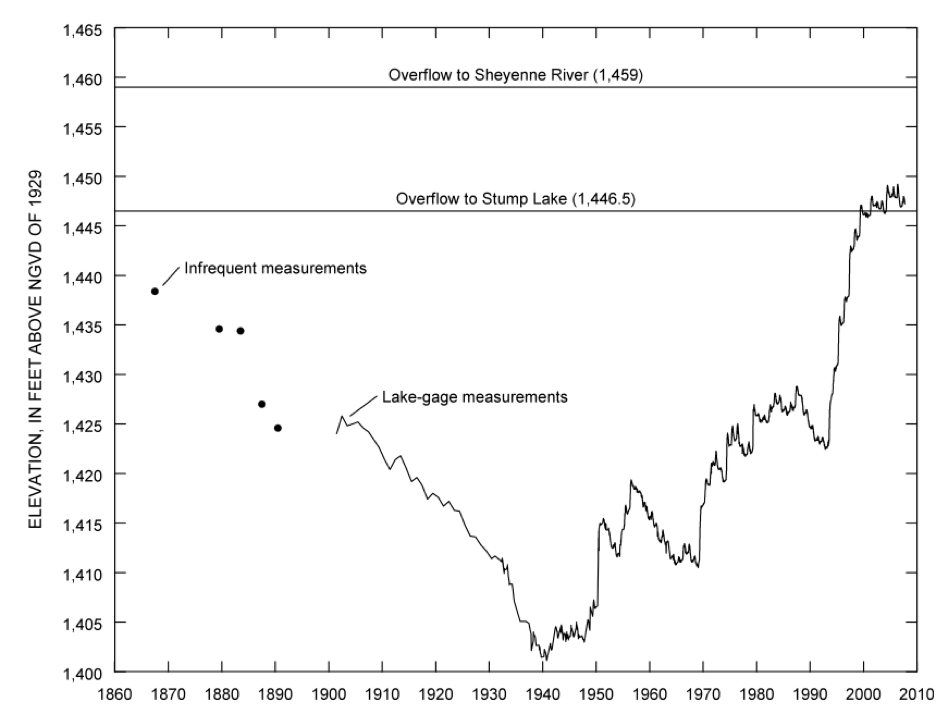
Recent history of Devil's Lake levels, including overflow to Stump Lake

Stump Lake is a natural endorheic lake located in Nelson County, North Dakota. It covers 15,742.4 acres (6,370.7 ha), has 72.5 miles (116.7 km) of shoreline, and has an average depth of 29.7 feet (9.1 m) with a maximum depth of 73.3 feet (22.3 m). It is stocked by the North Dakota Department of Natural Resources with Walleye, Yellow Perch, and Northern Pike.

Stump Lake's waters have risen 45 feet (14 m) in the last few years, and are now at the levels of neighboring Devils Lake, which is also endorheic. Devil's Lake will overflow into Stump Lake if the surface level reaches 1,447 feet (441 m). Stump Lake has no input or output of rivers or streams, and is only fed by rain or human sources. If water levels exceed 1,458 feet (444 m) the combined lake would flow into the Sheyenne River. This has not occurred since lake levels in this area have been recorded.

Stump Lake Park is found around the lake and is solely dedicated to it. Local Native Americans have referred to the lake as "Chicot" which translates as "a place of stumps".

The Stump Lake Park is the location of the Old Settler's Pavilion, listed on the U.S. National Register of Historic Places, which has been threatened by the rising water level.
