= Almeria, Nebraska =

Unincorporated community in Nebraska, United States

- Coordinates: 41°49′33″N 99°31′19″W
- Country: United States
- State: Nebraska
- County: Loup

Almeria is an unincorporated community in Loup County, Nebraska, United States. Its elevation is 2,333 feet (711 m), and it is located at 41°49′33″N 99°31′19″W. The community was named for Almeria Strohl, the wife of the community's founder, Wess Strohl, thus being unrelated to the homonymous Spanish city. It lies along Nebraska Highway 91, 10 miles (16 km) west-northwest of Taylor, the county seat of Loup County.
