= Tornado outbreak of April 30 – May 2, 2010 =

Weather event in the United States

Meteorological history
- Duration: April 30-May 2, 2010

Tornado outbreak
- Tornadoes: 60
- Max. rating: EF3 tornado
- Duration: ~48 hours

Overall effects
- Fatalities: 5 deaths (+ 31 non-tornadic), 23 injuries

A destructive multi-day tornado outbreak across a large portion of the Southern United States that occurred at the end of April and the beginning of May 2010. Five people were killed from the tornadoes – one in Arkansas, one in Tennessee, and three in Mississippi. The tornado event was overshadowed by the 2010 Tennessee floods, which occurred at the same time.

== Meteorological synopsis ==
A strong low-pressure system tracked across the Midwest beginning on April 29. A few tornadoes were reported from Kansas to Iowa that day, but with little damage.

A moderate risk of severe weather was issued on April 30 for a large swath from northern Illinois to southern Arkansas. Late that afternoon, tornadoes began to develop across the Ozarks and multiple tornado warnings were issued. Also, in less than a week, another PDS Tornado Watch was issued for Arkansas, Oklahoma, the Missouri Bootheel, and Texas. That evening in central Arkansas, the moderate risk was upgraded to a high risk for the second time in less than a week. Significant damage was reported in several areas. KARK coverage reported that a tornado touched down in Scotland, Arkansas and major damage, at least 25 injuries and 3 fatalities were reported there. In East End, Arkansas, major damage was also reported with several injuries.

Another high risk was issued for May 1 for Arkansas, northern Mississippi, West Tennessee, southwestern Kentucky and southeastern Missouri, the first occurrence of back-to-back high risk days since 2006. Activity began in the afternoon on the warm front, where a destructive tornado touched down in northeastern Mississippi with severe damage near Ripley. Yet again, another PDS Tornado watch was issued for Arkansas, Louisiana, and Texas. The activity, however, was confirmed primarily to areas closer to the Mississippi River.

The same system also produced copious amounts of rain over much of the Mid-South, with widespread flooding reported in Tennessee. Interstates 40 and 24 had to be shut down in the Nashville area due to water covering those major highways. The flooding was so bad on those two Interstate highways, stranded motorists were rescued in boats.

== Confirmed Tornadoes ==
Confirmed tornadoes by Enhanced Fujita rating
EFU	EF0	EF1	EF2	EF3	EF4	EF5	Total
0	21	23	13	3	0	0	60

=== April 30 event ===
List of confirmed tornadoes – Friday, April 30, 2010 (Note: All dates are based on the local time zone where the tornado touched down; however, all times are in Coordinated Universal Time for consistency.)
EF#	Location	County / Parish	State	Start Coord.	Time (UTC)	Path length	Max width	Summary
EF1	NW of Mountain Home, AR to SE of Hardenville, MO	Marion (AR), Ozark (MO)	AR, MO	36.4877°N 92.6096°W	22:49–23:12	16 mi (26 km)	440 yd (400 m)	Tornado developed along Bull Shoals Lake. Six homes along Price Place had their roofs and siding damage, before the tornado crossed into Missouri. In Missouri, damage consisted mostly of uprooted and snapped trees.
EF0	NW of Iron River	Iron	MI	46.1124°N 88.6579°W	22:50–22:51	0.4 mi (0.64 km)	100 yd (91 m)	A few outbuildings were damaged, and many trees were knocked down in the path.
EF1	S of Hardenville	Ozark	MO	36.5821°N 92.3718°W	23:12–23:14	3.72 mi (5.99 km)	440 yd (400 m)	Numerous outbuildings and trees were damaged.
EF0	E of Hardenville	Ozark	MO	36.59°N 92.35°W	23:14–23:15	0.82 mi (1.32 km)	100 yd (91 m)	Minor damage limited to a few trees.
EF1	N of Tecumseh	Ozark	MO	36.6379°N 92.2898°W	23:24–23:40	0.82 mi (1.32 km)	1,320 yd (1,210 m)	Three houses sustained significant damage and about 30 others sustained minor damage by this large wedge tornado. Extensive damage to trees was also evident throughout the path.
EF1	W of Cook Station	Crawford	MO	37.809°N 91.5091°W	23:50–23:53	1.94 mi (3.12 km)	100 yd (91 m)	Damage to several trees was found along a cemetery, where they were uprooted at the base.
EF3	SSE of Cleveland to Scotland to NW of Clinton	Conway, Van Buren	AR	35.4603°N 92.7155°W	23:56–00:30	20.28 mi (32.64 km)	700 yd (640 m)	1 death – After passing near the town of Cleveland, the tornado entered Van Buren County, impacting the small town of Scotland. Here, at least 13 houses or mobile homes were destroyed and 20 others damaged, as was the local community center. The fatality occurred when a woman was thrown from her destroyed house. Past this area, multiple barns, outbuildings, and a gas well were either severely damaged or destroyed. Thousands of trees were also snapped or uprooted after the tornado exited town, eventually dissipating near Clinton. 15 others were injured.
EF1	SE of Berlin	Green Lake	WI	43.9245°N 88.9129°W	00:00–00:02	2 mi (3.2 km)	100 yd (91 m)	Minor damage to a house and a barn. Many trees, several power poles and an antenna were snapped.
EF1	NW of Burnham to SE of Willow Springs	Howell	MO	36.9447°N 91.9653°W	00:05–00:10	2.74 mi (4.41 km)	1,320 yd (1,210 m)	Large wedge tornado heavily damaged several houses, a store and a water treatment plant. Many trees were also damaged.
EF0	E of Glen Oak	Marquette, Green Lake	WI	43.7107°N 89.2801°W	00:15–00:23	8.2 mi (13.2 km)	50 yd (46 m)	Intermittent tornado touchdown damaged numerous trees.
EF0	NW of Marquette	Marquette, Green Lake	WI	43.7274°N 89.3048°W	00:15–00:24	7.25 mi (11.67 km)	50 yd (46 m)	Damage limited to a few trees. This tornado occurred simultaneously with the previous event.
EF1	W of Belfast	Grant	AR	34.3929°N 92.5105°W	00:46–00:52	2.78 mi (4.47 km)	75 yd (69 m)	A house and a church were damaged and a barn lost part of its roof.
EF1	NW of Shirley to NE of Fox	Van Buren, Stone	AR	35.7114°N 92.3951°W	00:48–01:05	8.87 mi (14.27 km)	150 yd (140 m)	This tornado was produced by the same supercell that spawned the Scotland EF3. Several mobile homes and sheds were destroyed. Extensive tree damage along the path.
EF2	NE of Center Ridge to SSW of Bee Branch	Conway, Van Buren	AR	35.3549°N 92.6427°W	00:55–01:18	11.77 mi (18.94 km)	200 yd (180 m)	12 houses and two mobile homes were destroyed, and at least 30 other houses were damaged, some heavily. Three churches were also damaged.
EF2	SSW of Sardis to S of Little Rock	Saline, Grant, Pulaski	AR	34.4668°N 92.4234°W	00:59–01:31	17.45 mi (28.08 km)	500 yd (460 m)	After touching down and touching small sections of Grant County, the tornado reached peak intensity in Saline County. Here, 4 houses and 11 mobile homes destroyed, and multiple others received damage. A fire station was destroyed, and a church had its roof blown away. In Pulaski County, 3 houses and 6 mobile homes destroyed, and numerous others were damaged. Trees and power lines were also blown down. Eight people were injured.
EF1	NW of Fletcher to SW of Otto	Washington, Jefferson	MO	38.1917°N 90.785°W	01:08–01:40	18.33 mi (29.50 km)	581 yd (531 m)	Tornado uprooted many trees and damaged several houses. A church was also heavily damaged.
EF2	E of Sweet Home to Jacksonville to SSW of McRae	Pulaski, Lonoke, White	AR	34.693°N 92.1878°W	01:35–02:30	34.68 mi (55.81 km)	1,000 yd (910 m)	This long-tracked, strong wedge tornado touched down soon after the previous one dissipated. Several buildings were damaged at the Little Rock River Port. At least 40 houses or mobile homes were destroyed and about 140 others were damaged. Extensive damage also to trees and power lines. Despite the extent of the damage, no one was injured or killed.
EF2	Dierks	Howard	AR	34.114°N 94.037°W	01:37–01:41	1.85 mi (2.98 km)	150 yd (140 m)	Numerous houses and businesses were damaged, including a laundromat and a storage building which were destroyed. As it crossed the town, multiple trees and powerlines were downed. A chicken house also had a section of its roof ripped off, before the tornado dissipated.
EF2	SW of Merrimac to NE Warnock	Monroe	IL	38.3505°N 90.3498°W	01:50–01:57	7.24 mi (11.65 km)	350 yd (320 m)	Several houses were damaged. A large hangar at Jacobs Field was heavily damaged. Upgrade from EF1 to EF2 in later analysis.
EF0	NW of Waterloo	Monroe	IL	38.33°N 90.23°W	01:57–01:58	0.11 mi (0.18 km)	50 yd (46 m)	This tornado touched down soon after the previous one lifted. A few large trees and several large tree limbs were downed, damaging one house.
EF0	SSW of Annapolis	Iron	MO	37.32°N 90.74°W	02:06–02:08	0.32 mi (0.51 km)	50 yd (46 m)	Several trees were knocked down by the brief tornado, damaging a shed.
EF1	SE of Kensett	White	AR	35.20°N 91.72°W	02:55–03:05	2.41 miles (3.88 km)	150 yd (140 m)	Several houses lost their roofs and outbuildings were damaged.
EF0	SE of Dierks	Howard	AR	34.071°N 93.97°W	03:24–03:25	0.81 mi (1.30 km)	75 yd (69 m)	A barn and an outbuilding were damaged.
EF3	W of Weldon to NNE of Blackville	Jackson	AR	35.446°N 91.2711°W	03:40–03:54	7.74 mi (12.46 km)	1,000 yd (910 m)	This tornado, the last from the Little Rock supercell, destroyed a church and a power substation. A cropduster plane was severely damaged, while a nearby hangar was destroyed. A mobile home was overturned and destroyed, and significant roof damage occurred to homes in the area. A grain elevator was badly damaged, and an irrigation pivot was overturned. Multiple outbuildings were damaged or destroyed, and multiple trees were downed or uprooted.
EF1	N of Carthage	Dallas	AR	34.0703°N 92.5692°W	03:52–03:55	1.87 mi (3.01 km)	50 yd (46 m)	A mobile home was blown off its foundation and numerous trees were damaged.

=== May 1 event ===
List of confirmed tornadoes – Saturday, May 1, 2010
EF#	Location	County / Parish	State	Start Coord.	Time (UTC)	Path length	Max width	Summary
EF0	N of Hamlin	Calloway	KY	36.6314°N 88.1843°W	08:02–08:12	6.04 mi (9.72 km)	75 yd (69 m)	Approximately 50 trees were snapped or uprooted.
EF1	SE of Cotton Plant to NNW of Dumas	Union, Tippah	MS	34.5775°N 88.9967°W	18:34–18:47	10.34 mi (16.64 km)	200 yd (180 m)	The tornado touched down in Union County, inflicting minor damage to an outbuilding. In Tippah County, six homes sustained minor to moderate damage, a roof was peeled off a mobile home, a barn, a few vehicles, and a church were damaged, and many trees were felled.
EF0	NE of Loretto	Lawrence	TN	35.0963°N 87.4329°W	21:23–21:26	3.11 mi (5.01 km)	100 yd (91 m)	A couple dozen trees were uprooted, a few trees were snapped, and a home suffered minor roof damage.
EF1	SE of Artesian	Calhoun, Bradley	AR	33.3128°N 92.3858°W	23:41–23:45	2.82 mi (4.54 km)	35 yd (32 m)	The tornado began in Calhoun County before entering Bradley County. Trees and tree limbs were blown down on timber lands in both counties.
EF1	S of Herbine	Cleveland	AR	33.7686°N 92.0312°W	00:27–00:28	0.46 mi (0.74 km)	50 yd (46 m)	Numerous trees were felled.
EF0	W of Bivins	Cass	TX	33.0118°N 94.2°W	01:29–01:31	0.91 mi (1.46 km)	150 yd (140 m)	Many trees were uprooted, numerous tree limbs were downed, about seven homes sustained minor roof and siding damage, and a church sustained minor roof damage.
EF1	Primrose area	Woodruff, Cross	AR	35.1853°N 91.0762°W	01:55–02:05	8.66 mi (13.94 km)	200 yd (180 m)	The tornado began in Woodruff County, removing a portion of a roof from a flying service hangar and causing a wall to cave in. Portions of two walls were removed from a home and its roof was partially removed. In Cross County, three homes sustained various degrees of damage, several outbuildings were damaged, and a two-story barn was completely collapsed. Trees, power poles, and power lines were snapped or felled in both counties.
EF1	E of Harrisburg	Poinsett	AR	35.5222°N 90.6177°W	02:36–02:40	6.21 mi (9.99 km)	400 yd (370 m)	A tractor disc was moved, and several transmission lines, trees, and power poles were damaged. An office trailer was destroyed, a crop duster hangar and a home were damaged, and a barn was destroyed.
EF0	N of Prescott	Nevada	AR	33.859°N 93.388°W	02:47–02:48	1.68 mi (2.70 km)	75 yd (69 m)	Several tree limbs were snapped, and a tree top was twisted off.
EF0	W of Caraway	Craighead	AR	35.7506°N 90.4266°W	02:58–02:59	0.03 mi (0.048 km)	25 yd (23 m)	A tornado was photographed by an eyewitness.
EF0	WSW of Hendrickson	Butler	MO	36.874°N 90.579°W	03:00–03:01	0.47 mi (0.76 km)	175 yd (160 m)	Several large trees were downed.
EF1	Millington	Shelby	TN	35.3228°N 89.9383°W	03:47–03:48	0.61 mi (0.98 km)	100 yd (91 m)	Several trees and a couple of wooden poles were downed and twisted.

=== May 2 event ===
List of confirmed tornadoes – Sunday, May 2, 2010
EF#	Location	County / Parish	State	Start Coord.	Time (UTC)	Path length	Max width	Summary
EF2	NW of Jordan to SE of Clinton	Fulton, Hickman	KY	36.5222°N 89.0553°W	06:05–06:25	12.46 mi (20.05 km)	600 yd (550 m)	In Fulton County, trees and limbs were downed, houses and outbuildings sustained minor damage, and a mobile home was moved a few feet with its roof peeled back. A boat on a trailer was flipped over, and anchored television antennae were pulled from the ground and bent. In Hickman County, several pole barns were damaged or destroyed, large trees were snapped or uprooted, several homes and their attendant carports sustained various degrees of damage, and a two-story garage was destroyed.
EF0	W of Nesbit	DeSoto	MS	34.8759°N 90.0442°W	06:10–06:12	1.08 mi (1.74 km)	100 yd (91 m)	Several large trees were downed, including a couple that were snapped, and shingle damage was observed.
EF1	ENE of Pope	Panola	MS	34.2432°N 89.8904°W	06:42–06:43	0.11 mi (0.18 km)	30 yd (27 m)	Trees were snapped, power lines were downed, a dumpster was overturned, and bolted-down playground equipment was tossed.
EF0	NE of Mayfield	Graves	KY	36.7613°N 88.5263°W	06:47–06:50	2.35 mi (3.78 km)	40 yd (37 m)	A small wooden shed was demolished, with debris tossed outward up to 90 yd (82 m). Trees and tree limbs were snapped, downed, or uprooted.
EF0	SE of Gadsden	Crockett	TN	35.7736°N 88.9905°W	07:14–07:15	0.02 mi (0.032 km)	25 yd (23 m)	Many trees were snapped.
EF2	E of Humboldt	Gibson	TN	35.8088°N 88.9066°W	07:20–07:25	3.04 mi (4.89 km)	200 yd (180 m)	Numerous trees were damaged, snapped, or uprooted, and several power poles and power lines were downed. Numerous homes sustained various degrees of damage, and a carport, two medal sheds, and a wooden swing set were all completely destroyed. A tour bus was lifted and turned, and a semi-trailer was flipped over.
EF3	SSW of Ashland, MS to E of Pocahontas, TN	Benton (MS), Tippah (MS), Hardeman (TN), McNairy (TN)	MS, TN	34.8008°N 89.1893°W	07:48–08:18	29.58 mi (47.60 km)	880 yd (800 m)	3 deaths – A long-lived and significant tornado began in Benton County, Mississippi, inflicting minor damage to 23 homes, causing major damage to 6 homes, and completely destroying 11 homes. A transmission tower collapsed and was severely twisted. In Tippah County, Mississippi, numerous homes were damaged and five were destroyed. After crossing the state line into Hardeman County, Tennessee, the tornado completely destroyed 2 mobile homes and a house, inflicted major damage to 13 homes, and caused minor damage to 5 houses and 2 mobile homes. It dissipated in McNairy County. In all four counties, numerous trees were snapped, downed, or debarked, and numerous power poles were downed. The tornado resulted in three fatalities, two in Benton County and a third in Hardeman County; all were occupants in destroyed mobile homes.
EF2	NW of Crofton	Christian	KY	37.0571°N 87.5981°W	07:49–08:00	9.54 mi (15.35 km)	300 yd (270 m)	The tornado leveled a garage, severely damaged or destroyed three mobile homes, and inflicted moderate to major damage to two mobile homes. Several barns received minor to moderate damage, and hundreds of trees were snapped or uprooted.
EF0	White Plains area	Hopkins	KY	37.1382°N 87.4°W	08:04–08:05	0.53 mi (0.85 km)	75 yd (69 m)	A barn was blown down, a mobile home was moved slightly with a portion of its roof removed, and several trees and tree limbs were felled.
EF0	W of Ramer	McNairy	TN	35.0787°N 88.7365°W	08:20–08:21	0.16 mi (0.26 km)	50 yd (46 m)	Several trees were felled, and a mobile home sustained minor roof damage.
EF2	SW of Selmer to W of Lebanon	McNairy, Hardin	TN	35.1184°N 88.6892°W	08:24–08:58	25.74 mi (41.42 km)	880 yd (800 m)	The tornado began in McNairy County, moving across the county and impacting parts of Selmer and Milledgeville. A large house and a mobile home were moved off their foundations, a trailer was destroyed, several buildings were collapsed, and a barn and two churches were destroyed. Overall, 22 houses and 15 mobile homes were completely destroyed, 59 houses and 11 mobile homes sustained major damage, and 219 houses and 12 mobile homes experienced minor damage. Several other buildings or outbuildings were damaged or destroyed. In Hardin County, a house sustained major damage while roof damage was inflicted to a second, and a shed sustained minor damage. In both counties, numerous trees were downed, some of which caused damage to structures.
EF2	Abbeville	Lafayette	MS	34.4891°N 89.5129°W	08:27–08:29	1.43 mi (2.30 km)	75 yd (69 m)	1 death – A single family home was destroyed, killing an occupant, a mobile home was destroyed, three other homes sustained major damage, and numerous trees were uprooted.
EF0	N of Cedar Grove	Henderson, Decatur	TN	35.4984°N 88.2825°W	09:13–09:22	5.7 mi (9.2 km)	100 yd (91 m)	The tornado began in Henderson County, Tennessee before dissipating in Decatur County. An outbuilding and building sustained roof damage, five homes were damaged, and several trees were knocked down.
EF1	S of Lobelville	Perry	TN	35.6989°N 87.8503°W	09:45–09:56	6.93 mi (11.15 km)	250 yd (230 m)	Hundreds of trees were snapped or uprooted, a home sustained minor roof damage, and a few outbuildings were destroyed.
EF2	WNW of Centerville	Perry, Hickman	TN	35.7911°N 87.6977°W	10:00–10:12	9.15 mi (14.73 km)	600 yd (550 m)	Thousands of trees were snapped or uprooted, a brick home sustained considerable structural damage, and several barns were destroyed.
EF2	W of Wrigley	Hickman	TN	35.8921°N 87.5126°W	10:17–10:22	3.89 mi (6.26 km)	250 yd (230 m)	Hundreds of trees were snapped, a brick home sustained significant roof damage, and several barns were destroyed.
EF1	N of Nashville	Davidson	TN	36.2867°N 86.7464°W	11:07–11:12	3.64 mi (5.86 km)	300 yd (270 m)	Several trailers sustained roof and underpinning damage, an old building and other structures had their roofs uplifted or removed, power poles and business signs were blown over, and hundreds of trees were snapped. Several large projectiles impacted the Rivergate Mall, leaving craters in the facade.
EF1	NNW of Hendersonville	Sumner	TN	36.3308°N 86.6444°W	11:17–11:27	5.05 mi (8.13 km)	400 yd (370 m)	Hundreds of trees were snapped and several structures sustained roof damage, including an old home that was lifted partially off its foundation.
EF1	NW of Primm Springs	Hickman	TN	35.8374°N 87.2672°W	11:45–11:47	2.73 mi (4.39 km)	50 yd (46 m)	Numerous trees were snapped and uprooted.
EF0	Tompkinsville	Monroe	KY	36.7°N 85.7576°W	13:35–13:37	5.7 mi (9.2 km)	50 yd (46 m)	A tobacco barn and several trees were damaged.
EF2	WNW of Delta	Wayne	KY	36.8855°N 84.73°W	20:25–20:30	0.25 mi (0.40 km)	100 yd (91 m)	Numerous trees were felled and the roof was blown off a brick home, resulting in the collapse of an outside wall corner.

== Flooding ==
Flooding from thunderstorms in the areas affected was also common, with some places experiencing record flooding. At least 13 inches (0.33 m) of rain fell in Nashville, Tennessee, breaking the old two-day total record of 6.68 inches (17.0 cm) set in 1979 by the remnants of Hurricane Frederic.

== See also ==
- Tornadoes of 2010
- List of United States tornadoes in April 2010
- List of United States tornadoes in May 2010
- List of North American tornadoes and tornado outbreaks
- List of Storm Prediction Center high risk days
