= List of United States tornadoes from November to December 2009 =

Reflectivity (left) and relative velocity (right) radar loops of a thunderstorm that spawned an EF2 tornado in Longview, Texas, on December 23

Between November and December 2009, 51 tornadoes touched down across eight states. (Note: Event listings by the National Climatic Data Center are divided by county. As such, tornadoes that track across multiple counties are split into multiple summaries and the total number of event listings does not represent the actual number of tornadoes.) Collectively, the tornadoes injured nine people and wrought $20.36 million, (Note: All damage totals are in 2009 USD unless otherwise stated.) much of which resulted from an EF3—the strongest tornado during the two-month period—that struck Lufkin, Texas, on December 23. Compared to annual averages, November was one of the quietest on record while December was one of the most active on record for their respective months. With only three confirmed events in November, the month ranks as the third quietest on record since 1950. (Note: Extensive tornado records, compiled by the National Climatic Data Center, begin in 1950; however, it is widely known that improving technology and reports from storm chasers have improved the comprehensiveness of data in recent years and countless tornadoes in older years have gone undocumented.) The opposite is true for December, during which 45 tornadoes touched down; at the time, this was the second highest since 2000 and the sixth highest since reliable records began.

The month of November featured no tornado outbreaks (Note: Although no official definition of a tornado outbreak exists, Grazulis (1993) describes one as "a group or family of six or more tornadoes spawned by the same general weather system." Galway (1975) described events with 6–9 tornadoes as small, 10–19 as moderate, and ≥20 as large. Furthermore, an outbreak in Florida—south of 30°N—is defined by Hagemeyer and Matney (1994) as "four or more tornadoes in [four] hours or less.") while December featured two. The first spawned 7 tornadoes on December 2 and the second, more prolific event, resulted in 28 tornadoes from December 23–24. Twelve tornadoes touched down within the warning area of the National Weather Service office in Lake Charles, Louisiana—the largest such event in their jurisdiction since November 23, 2004. Both outbreaks were the result of strong extratropical cyclones that moved across the Southern United States, with tornadoes primarily developing along a cold front that extended south of the system's center or within supercells ahead of the front.

== Daily statistics ==
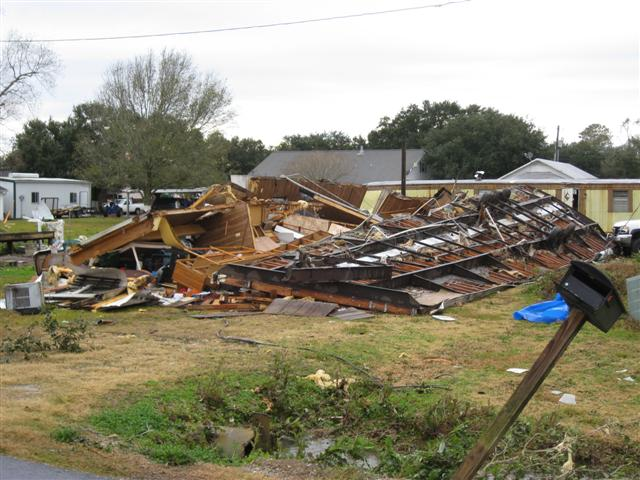
A mobile home that was destroyed by an EF2 tornado in Gueydan, Louisiana, on December 24

Daily statistics of days with confirmed tornadoes in November and December 2009 (Note: All dates are based on the local time zone where the tornado touched down; however, all times are in Coordinated Universal Time for consistency.)
Date	Total	Enhanced Fujita scale rating						Deaths	Injuries	Damage	Ref.
Date	Total	EF0	EF1	EF2	EF3	EF4	EF5	Deaths	Injuries	Damage	Ref.
November 6	1	1	0	0	0	0	0	0	0	$35,000	
November 29	2	1	1	0	0	0	0	0	0	$75,000	
December 2	7	4	2	1	0	0	0	0	2	$3,235,000	
December 8	1	1	0	0	0	0	0	0	0	$2,000	
December 9	2	1	1	0	0	0	0	0	1	$50,000	
December 14	2	2	0	0	0	0	0	0	0	$0	
December 15	1	1	0	0	0	0	0	0	0	$3,000	
December 18	4	4	0	0	0	0	0	0	0	$90,000	
December 23	9	3	3	2	1	0	0	0	2	$11,251,100	
December 24	19	12	4	3	0	0	0	0	4	$5,732,000	
Monthly aggregates
November total	3	2	1	0	0	0	0	0	0	$110,000	
December total	45	28	10	6	1	0	0	0	9	$20,363,000	

== November ==
Confirmed tornadoes by Enhanced Fujita rating
EFU	EF0	EF1	EF2	EF3	EF4	EF5	Total
0	2	1	0	0	0	0	3

=== November 6 event ===
List of confirmed tornadoes – Monday, November 9, 2009
EF#	Location	County / Parish	State	Start Coord.	Time (UTC)	Path length	Max width	Damage	Summary
EF0	WNW of Neotsu	Lincoln	OR	45.01°N 124.01°W	05:30–05:40	0.09 miles (0.14 km)	80 yards (73 m)	$35,000	A strong thunderstorm produced a waterspout along the coastline near Lincoln City. Once onshore and classifiable as a tornado, the system tracked through Roads End, damaging eleven homes and three cars. One home had nearly half its roof destroyed. Several trees were also uprooted and/or snapped; one tree was tossed roughly 20 yd (18 m) by the tornado.

=== November 29 event ===
List of confirmed tornadoes – Sunday, November 29, 2009
EF#	Location	County / Parish	State	Start Coord.	Time (UTC)	Path length	Max width	Damage	Summary
EF0	NW of Douglas	Cochise	AZ	31.4114°N 109.6219°W	17:57	0.1 miles (0.16 km)	50 yards (46 m)	$0	A trained spotter confirmed that a funnel cloud briefly touched down before dissipating.
EF1	NNW of New Boston	Bowie	TX	33.4744°N 94.4295°W	23:57–23:58	3.32 miles (5.34 km)	75 yards (69 m)	$75,000	A brief tornado touched down just outside the city of New Boston, destroying a mobile home and damaging four other structures. Shortly after crossing Interstate 30, the tornado dissipated.

== December ==
Confirmed tornadoes by Enhanced Fujita rating
EFU	EF0	EF1	EF2	EF3	EF4	EF5	Total
0	28	10	6	1	0	0	45

=== December 2 event ===
List of confirmed tornadoes – Wednesday, December 2, 2009
EF#	Location	County / Parish	State	Start Coord.	Time (UTC)	Path length	Max width	Damage	Summary
EF0	SE of Crestview	Okaloosa	FL	30.7193°N 86.5643°W	13:32	0.01 miles (0.016 km)	50 yards (46 m)	$0	A brief tornado was reported by the Duke Field Fire Department at Eglin Air Force Base but no damage took place.
EF0	E of Juliette	Jones	GA	33.0862°N 83.7401°W	18:30-18:33	1.53 miles (2.46 km)	100 yards (91 m)	$15,000	A short-lived tornado, with winds estimated at 80 mph (130 km/h), tracked through a forested area, damaging 50 to 100 trees worth a total of $15,000.
EF0	W of Eatonton	Putnam	GA	33.32°N 83.4545°W	18:55-18:58	1.71 miles (2.75 km)	100 yards (91 m)	$100,000	Another short-lived tornado touched down in a forested area, the Chattahoochee-Oconee National Forest. With winds estimated at 85 mph (140 km/h), this tornado nearly 500 trees were uprooted or damaged. Two hunters in the forest at the time were trapped by the felled trees and required rescue, though they sustained no injuries. Losses were placed at $100,000 in the national forest.
EF1	NE of Eatonton	Putnam	GA	33.4297°N 83.3256°W	19:02-19:08	0.8 miles (1.3 km)	100 yards (91 m)	$120,000	A second tornado in Putnam County struck a more populated area; two structures were damaged and another destroyed. A mobile home was rolled on its side by the tornado but the occupant was unharmed. Hundreds of trees and several power lines were also felled by the tornado. Total losses were placed at $120,000.
EF0	E of Douglas	Coffee	GA	31.492°N 82.786°W	19:15-19:21	3.23 miles (5.20 km)	100 yards (91 m)	Unknown	Intermittent tornado touchdown snapped some trees, a few landing on weak buildings.
EF1	NW of Alma	Bacon	GA	31.623°N 82.581°W	19:45-19:48	0.66 miles (1.06 km)	100 yards (91 m)	$3,000,000	Three chicken houses were destroyed.
EF2	NNW of Bristol	Pierce, Appling	GA	31.5075°N 82.2364°W	20:15-20:30	5.13 miles (8.26 km)	440 yards (400 m)	Unknown	A mobile home and three metal structures were destroyed, one of which was flattened. Five other structures - including three wood frame houses - were also damaged. Two people were injured.

=== December 8 event ===
List of confirmed tornadoes – Tuesday, December 8, 2009
EF#	Location	County / Parish	State	Start Coord.	Time (UTC)	Path length	Max width	Damage	Summary
EF0	NNW of Carthage	Leake	MS	32.8102°N 89.5695°W	02:35–02:40	6.54 miles (10.53 km)	75 yards (69 m)	$2,000	A weak tornado downed numerous tree limbs along its path.

=== December 9 event ===
List of confirmed tornadoes – Wednesday, December 9, 2009
EF#	Location	County / Parish	State	Start Coord.	Time (UTC)	Path length	Max width	Damage	Summary
EF0	NE of Lake Jackson	Leon	FL	30.5399°N 84.3207°W	17:05–17:06	0.64 miles (1.03 km)	50 yards (46 m)	$50,000	A tornado touched down near Lake Jackson and traveled east-northeast. One home lost a large portion of its shingles with debris carried 50 to 100 ft (15 to 30 m) away. The tornado also snapped three large trees in the home's backyard.
EF1	ESE of Jesup	Wayne	GA	31.5872°N 81.8473°W	19:15–19:25	1.6 miles (2.6 km)	250 yards (230 m)	Unknown	A mobile home and shed were destroyed, with debris thrown 0.25 mi (0.40 km) away; one person inside the mobile home was injured. A school bus was tossed into a ditch; the driver escaped without injury. Numerous trees and power lines were snapped along the tornado's path.

=== December 14 event ===
List of confirmed tornadoes – Monday, December 14, 2009
EF#	Location	County / Parish	State	Start Coord.	Time (UTC)	Path length	Max width	Damage	Summary
EF0	ESE of Java	Coffee	AL	31.5391°N 85.7952°W	22:20-22:21	0.1 miles (0.16 km)	30 yards (27 m)	$0	Brief tornado touchdown in an open field.
EF0	NW of Rocky Head	Coffee	AL	31.5682°N 85.7716°W	22:25-22:26	0.15 miles (0.24 km)	50 yards (46 m)	$0	Brief tornado downed a few trees.

=== December 15 event ===
List of confirmed tornadoes – Tuesday, December 15, 2009
EF#	Location	County / Parish	State	Start Coord.	Time (UTC)	Path length	Max width	Damage	Summary
EF0	Westwego	Jefferson	LA	29.8958°N 90.1347°W	11:20-11:23	0.2 miles (0.32 km)	20 yards (18 m)	$3,000	Brief tornado snapped large tree limbs and power lines along the Westbank Expressway.

=== December 18 event ===
List of confirmed tornadoes – Friday, December 18, 2009
EF#	Location	County / Parish	State	Start Coord.	Time (UTC)	Path length	Max width	Damage	Summary
EF0	E of Homestead	Miami-Dade	FL	25.4585°N 80.4026°W	16:00-16:05	1.13 miles (1.82 km)	50 yards (46 m)	$0	Tornado touched down in an unpopulated area.
EF0	Key West	Monroe	FL	24.5534°N 81.7491°W	19:35-19:40	1.19 miles (1.92 km)	25 yards (23 m)	$10,000	Several trees were snapped, with debris downing a few power lines.
EF0	E of Vandolah	Hardee	FL	27.5441°N 81.9189°W	20:58-20:59	0.21 miles (0.34 km)	20 yards (18 m)	$75,000	Brief narrow tornado damaged a few buildings and vehicles at the Florida Institute for Neurologic Rehabilitation.
EF0	Key Largo	Monroe	FL	25.1438°N 80.3995°W	22:55-22:56	0.13 miles (0.21 km)	10 yards (9.1 m)	$5,000	Brief tornado at mile 104 on the Overseas Highway with minor damage.

=== December 23 event ===
List of confirmed tornadoes – Wednesday, December 23, 2009
EF#	Location	County / Parish	State	Start Coord.	Time (UTC)	Path length	Max width	Damage	Summary
EF0	NE of Jacksonville	Cherokee	TX	32.0069°N 95.18°W	20:35-20:40	2.28 miles (3.67 km)	50 yards (46 m)	Unknown	Damage was limited to a few trees.
EF0	NE of New Summerfield	Cherokee	TX	32.1051°N 95.026°W	21:04-21:06	2.79 miles (4.49 km)	50 yards (46 m)	$0	Damage was limited to a few trees.
EF2	Longview	Gregg	TX	32.4919°N 94.69°W	22:39-22:56	7.03 miles (11.31 km)	200 yards (180 m)	$1,000,000	Numerous industrial buildings, including a FedEx building, were heavily damaged. Several houses were also damaged and significant tree damage along its path.
EF1	SE of Avinger	Cass	TX	32.8887°N 94.5039°W	23:51-23:52	0.12 miles (0.19 km)	50 yards (46 m)	$0	A brief tornado in a wooded area damaged numerous trees and tree branches.
EF0	NNE of Recklaw	Rusk	TX	31.978°N 94.9474°W	01:16-01:17	0.11 miles (0.18 km)	150 yards (140 m)	$0	A brief tornado snapped a few trees.
EF3	Lufkin	Angelina	TX	31.3139°N 94.7152°W	03:56-04:07	4.06 miles (6.53 km)	300 yards (270 m)	$10,000,000	Three buildings were destroyed, including a welding shop and a funeral home. Many houses sustained significant roof damage and tree damage was widespread, including in a park. Several 18-wheelers were also thrown. Two people were injured.
EF1	SE of Atlanta	Cass (TX), Miller (AR)	TX, AR	33.038°N 94.0623°W	04:10-04:18	4.79 miles (7.71 km)	150 yards (140 m)	$100	One house sustained minor roof damage, and many trees and limbs were damaged.
EF1	SE of Garrison	Nacogdoches	TX	31.7794°N 94.4908°W	04:37-04:38	0.49 miles (0.79 km)	50 yards (46 m)	$1,000	Several trees were snapped and a small storage building was destroyed.
EF2	SW of Carthage	Shelby, Panola	TX	31.93°N 94.38°W	05:26-05:49	10.13 miles (16.30 km)	200 yards (180 m)	$250,000	Many houses were damaged, including roof and shingle damage. A barn and two mobile homes were destroyed.

=== December 24 event ===
List of confirmed tornadoes – Thursday, December 24, 2009
EF#	Location	County / Parish	State	Start Coord.	Time (UTC)	Path length	Max width	Damage	Summary
EF0	E of Pineland	Sabine	TX	31.261°N 93.9564°W	08:10-08:12	1.28 miles (2.06 km)	100 yards (91 m)	$1,000	Numerous trees and a few power lines were snapped.
EF0	S of Pleasant Hill	Sabine	LA	31.7458°N 93.507°W	09:24-09:26	1.19 miles (1.92 km)	75 yards (69 m)	$0	Several pecan trees were uprooted.
EF0	E of Fairmont	Sabine	TX	31.2082°N 93.729°W	09:28-09:29	0.29 miles (0.47 km)	50 yards (46 m)	$1,000	A brief tornado inflicted damage to trees and power lines along Toledo Bend Reservoir.
EF0	N of Many	Sabine	LA	31.5842°N 93.4995°W	10:21-10:25	2.67 miles (4.30 km)	75 yards (69 m)	$0	Numerous large pine trees were uprooted.
EF0	SW of Martin	Red River	LA	32.0301°N 93.234°W	11:36-11:39	2.76 miles (4.44 km)	50 yards (46 m)	$0	A few large trees were downed.
EF2	Whiteville	St. Landry, Avoyelles	LA	30.7703°N 92.1534°W	13:25-13:37	9.37 miles (15.08 km)	50 yards (46 m)	$510,000	A small church on cinder blocks was destroyed. A rice silo was thrown into a bayou and two tractor-trailers were also damaged.
EF2	N of Crowley	Acadia	LA	30.24°N 92.4°W	13:27-13:39	6.64 miles (10.69 km)	100 yards (91 m)	$4,000,000	At least 30 houses were damaged, primarily in a single subdivision that was especially hard hit where four houses were heavily damaged. The worst damage was a house that completely lost its roof. Four people were injured.
EF0	E of Evergreen	Avoyelles	LA	30.9143°N 92.0981°W	13:37-13:45	4.96 miles (7.98 km)	25 yards (23 m)	$5,000	Several trees were damaged.
EF0	W of Branch	Acadia	LA	30.3442°N 92.3752°W	13:40-13:45	2.08 miles (3.35 km)	25 yards (23 m)	$3,000	A small outbuilding was destroyed and a few trees were blown down.
EF0	Richard (1st tornado)	Acadia	LA	30.38°N 92.35°W	13:46-13:49	2.92 miles (4.70 km)	25 yards (23 m)	$5,000	Several trees were blown down, and a mobile home and barn were damaged.
EF1	Richard (2nd tornado)	Acadia	LA	30.3647°N 92.505°W	13:50-13:55	1.72 miles (2.77 km)	25 yards (23 m)	$20,000	A house and a church were damaged in town. Many trees were also damaged.
EF1	N of Iota	Acadia	LA	30.4239°N 92.3223°W	13:50-13:52	1.53 miles (2.46 km)	25 yards (23 m)	$20,000	A barn was destroyed, and two mobile homes lost their roofs.
EF0	W of Savoy	Acadia, St. Landry	LA	30.47°N 92.31°W	13:53-13:56	2.71 miles (4.36 km)	25 yards (23 m)	$7,000	A barn was damaged, along with many trees.
EF2	Gueydan	Vermilion	LA	29.98°N 92.53°W	13:57-14:03	5.58 miles (8.98 km)	50 yards (46 m)	$1,000,000	Two structures were destroyed, a mobile home which rolled and an outbuilding which was thrown into a water tower, and over 50 others were damaged, some of them heavily.
EF0	S of Chataignier	St. Landry, Evangeline	LA	30.5178°N 92.3095°W	13:58-14:02	2.07 miles (3.33 km)	25 yards (23 m)	$5,000	An outbuilding was damaged by the tornado.
EF0	NW of Long Bridge	Avoyelles	LA	31.0376°N 92.0443°W	13:59-14:00	0.26 miles (0.42 km)	10 yards (9.1 m)	$3,000	A mobile home was heavily damaged by the brief tornado.
EF1	SSE of Morse	Acadia	LA	30.0778°N 92.484°W	14:05-14:09	3.11 miles (5.01 km)	25 yards (23 m)	$50,000	A tornado quickly touched down after the first Gueydan tornado dissipated. Three houses and an entire farm were damaged.
EF1	W of Farmerville	Union	LA	32.77°N 92.54°W	14:20-14:26	5.96 miles (9.59 km)	150 yards (140 m)	$100,000	Two houses were damaged on the shores of Lake Darbonne. Many trees were snapped or knocked down.
EF0	E of Vancleave	Jackson	MS	30.6426°N 88.8108°W	21:50-21:53	0.3 miles (0.48 km)	20 yards (18 m)	$2,000	A brief tornado damaged a few trees.

== See also ==
- Tornadoes of 2009
- List of North American tornadoes and tornado outbreaks
- List of United States tornadoes from September to October 2009
- List of United States tornadoes from January to March 2010
