= List of United States tornadoes from September to October 2009 =

This is a list of all tornadoes that were confirmed by local offices of the National Weather Service in the United States from September to October 2009.

== September ==
Confirmed tornadoes by Enhanced Fujita rating
EFU	EF0	EF1	EF2	EF3	EF4	EF5	Total
0	6	2	0	0	0	0	8

=== September 2 event ===
List of reported tornadoes - Thursday, September 2, 2009
EF#	Location	County	Coord.	Time (UTC)	Path length	Damage
South Dakota
EF0	WNW of Kimball	Brule	43.73°N 99.01°W	2051	1 mile (1.6 km)	Damage limited to a few trees.
Sources: NWS Storm Data

=== September 3 event ===
List of reported tornadoes - Thursday, September 3, 2009
EF#	Location	County	Coord.	Time (UTC)	Path length	Damage
Colorado
EF0	WNW of Sugar City	Crowley	38.23°N 103.69°W	2128	2 miles (3.2 km)	Landspout tornado remained over open country.
Sources: NWS Storm Data

=== September 6 event ===
List of reported tornadoes - Sunday, September 6, 2009
EF#	Location	County	Coord.	Time (UTC)	Path length	Damage
Washington
EF1	E of Bonney Lake	Pierce	47.19°N 122.14°W	2319	9.6 miles (15.4 km)	A barn, a silo and a trailer were destroyed. Another barn was damaged along with trees and a nursery.
Sources: Storm Reports for September 6, 2009, NWS Seattle (PNS), NWS Storm Data

=== September 7 event ===
List of reported tornadoes - Monday, September 7, 2009
EF#	Location	County	Coord.	Time (UTC)	Path length	Damage
Tennessee
EF0	NW of McMinnville	Warren	35.72°N 85.81°W	2358	0.5 miles (0.80 km)	Minor peeling of metal roofs to a couple of homes, otherwise damaged mostly to trees.
Sources: Storm Reports for September 7, 2009, NWS Nashville (PNS), NWS Storm Data

=== September 16 event ===
List of reported tornadoes - Wednesday, September 16, 2009
EF#	Location	County	Coord.	Time (UTC)	Path length	Damage
Alabama
EF0	Lomax	Chilton	32.87°N 86.66°W	1558	0.66 miles (1.06 km)	A house sustained minor damage and an outbuilding was heavily damaged.
Sources: Storm Reports for September 16, 2009, NWS Birmingham, NWS Storm Data

=== September 20 event ===
List of reported tornadoes - Sunday, September 20, 2009
EF#	Location	County	Coord.	Time (UTC)	Path length	Damage
Indiana
EF1	NE of Borden	Clark	38.49°N 85.92°W	2158	0.75 miles (1.21 km)	Damage to a modular home (from a tree) and multiple trees. A shed was destroyed.
Sources: Storm Reports for September 20, 2009, NWS Louisville, NWS Storm Data

=== September 22 event ===
List of reported tornadoes - Tuesday, September 22, 2009
EF#	Location	County	Coord.	Time (UTC)	Path length	Damage
Texas
EF0	SE of San Perlita	Willacy	26.45°N 97.62°W	2130	unknown	Brief tornado reported by local television with no damage.
Sources: NWS Storm Data

=== September 24 event ===
List of reported tornadoes - Thursday, September 24, 2009
EF#	Location	County	Coord.	Time (UTC)	Path length	Damage
Nebraska
EF0	SW of Hollinger	Furnas	40.13°N 99.72°W	1945	unknown	Brief tornado touchdown with no damage.
Sources: NWS Storm Data

== October ==
Confirmed tornadoes by Enhanced Fujita rating
EFU	EF0	EF1	EF2	EF3	EF4	EF5	Total
0	38	20	6	0	0	0	65

Note: 1 tornado was confirmed in the final totals, but does not have a listed rating.

=== October 1 event ===
List of reported tornadoes - Thursday, October 1, 2009
EF#	Location	County/ Parish	Coord.	Time (UTC)	Path length	Damage
Louisiana
EF0	WSW of Lucky	Bienville	32.21°N 93.11°W	0415	3 miles (4.8 km)	Tornado remained primarily in open timber land.
Sources: Storm Reports for October 2, 2009, NCDC Storm Data

=== October 3 event ===
List of reported tornadoes - Saturday, October 3, 2009
EF#	Location	County	Coord.	Time (UTC)	Path length	Damage
Texas
EF0	NNW of Edna	Jackson	29.05°N 96.62°W	2012	unknown	A few trees and power poles were blown down near FM 530.
Sources: NCDC Storm Data

=== October 7 event ===
List of reported tornadoes - Wednesday, October 7, 2009
EF#	Location	County	Coord.	Time (UTC)	Path length	Damage
Alabama
EF0	SW of Moulton	Lawrence	34.43°N 87.37°W	0630	0.75 miles (1.21 km)	A chicken house collapsed and a mobile home were damaged.
Sources: Storm Reports for October 6, 2009, NWS Huntsville, NCDC Storm Data

=== October 9 event ===
List of reported tornadoes - Friday, October 9, 2009
EF#	Location	County/ Parish	Coord.	Time (UTC)	Path length	Damage
North Dakota
EF0	ENE of Sanish	Mountrail	47.99°N 102.55°W	1500	unknown	Brief waterspout touched down on Lake Sakakawea and made landfall.
Louisiana
EF1	E of Farmerville	Union	32.77°N 92.26°W	1512	1 mile (1.6 km)	One house was destroyed by a fallen tree, and several other houses were damaged. One person was injured.
Mississippi
EF0	Benoit area	Bolivar	33.67°N 90.68°W	1643	2 miles (3.2 km)	Minor damage to several houses, a farm building and a mobile home.
EF1	S of Wayside	Washington	33.25°N 91.03°W	1645	2 miles (3.2 km)	1 death - Three mobile homes were destroyed and 16 houses were damaged, and many trees were knocked down. The fatality took place in a mobile home. Two others were injured.
Kentucky
EF2	Mud Lick area	Monroe	36.77°N 85.71°W	1720	15.6 miles (25.1 km)	Extensive tree damage along the path. A few houses and barns were also heavily damaged.
EF0	ESE of Hardinsburg	Breckinridge	37.72°N 86.22°W	1820	0.5 miles (0.80 km)	Two barns were destroyed and several mobile homes were damaged.
EF2	SW of Liberty	Casey	37.27°N 85.05°W	1836	1.5 miles (2.4 km)	Extensive damage to trees and houses.
EF1	Jinks area	Estill	37.60°N 84.01°W	2043	3.75 miles (6.04 km)	Numerous trees were uprooted. A motor home and a barn were heavily damaged.
Tennessee
EF1	SW of Ridgetop	Robertson, Davidson	36.38°N 86.80°W	1712	1.82 miles (2.93 km)	A house and an outbuilding sustained roof damaged and an old barn was destroyed. One person was injured.
EF1	S of Fayetteville	Lincoln	35.15°N 86.56°W	2057	3.2 miles (5.1 km)	A house sustained significant damage with minor injuries to one occupant. Many large trees were damaged.
EF0	E of Jasper	Marion	35.10°N 85.65°W	2248	2 miles (3.2 km)	Numerous trees were knocked down.
EF0	Haletown	Marion	35.04°N 85.52°W	2255	0.1 miles (0.16 km)	Brief tornado knocked down a few trees.
EF0	N of Niota	Monroe	35.62°N 84.55°W	2315	0.2 miles (0.32 km)	Tornado reported along Interstate 75. A few trees were knocked down.
EF0	E of Englewood	McMinn	35.42°N 84.43°W	0025	0.2 miles (0.32 km)	Brief tornado touchdown with minor damage.
Sources: Storm Reports for October 9, 2009, NWS Louisville, NWS Jackson, MS, NWS Nashville, NWS Shreveport, NWS Huntsville, NWS Morristown, NCDC Storm Data

=== October 15 event ===
List of reported tornadoes - Thursday, October 15, 2009
EF#	Location	County/ Parish	Coord.	Time (UTC)	Path length	Damage
Louisiana
EF0	NW of St. Joseph	Tensas	31.97°N 91.30°W	1744	1 mile (1.6 km)	A mobile home rolled over and two commercial buildings were damaged.
Georgia
EF1	S of Americus	Sumter	32.00°N 84.25°W	2300	2 miles (3.2 km)	A grocery store was heavily damaged and a house was also damaged. At least 100 trees were snapped.
Sources: Storm Reports for October 15, 2009, NWS Peachtree City, NCDC Storm Data

=== October 22 event ===
List of reported tornadoes - Thursday, October 22, 2009
EF#	Location	County/ Parish	Coord.	Time (UTC)	Path length	Damage
Louisiana
EF0	Grand Chenier	Cameron	29.77°N 92.77°W	1532	1 mile (1.6 km)	Tornado started as a waterspout that moved ashore in open marshlands with no damage.
EF0	Coushatta	Red River	32.02°N 93.34°W	1620	0.5 miles (0.80 km)	Brief tornado snapped several trees.
EF0	W of Lake Arthur	Jefferson Davis	30.05°N 92.75°W	1700	8 miles (13 km)	Damaged limited to power lines and poles in the rural area.
EF1	NW of Jennings	Jefferson Davis	30.22°N 92.66°W	1722	16 miles (26 km)	Large multiple-vortex tornado remained mostly over rural countryside with minor damage to trees, power lines and houses. One person was injured when a vehicle was thrown as the tornado crossed Interstate 10.
EF1	Elton area	Jefferson Davis, Allen	30.43°N 92.70°W	1747	5 miles (8.0 km)	15 houses were damaged and many trees and power lines were snapped.
EF0	SE of Chestnut	Natchitoches	31.91°N 92.92°W	1753	0.5 miles (0.80 km)	Brief tornado snapped several trees.
EF0	N of Elton	Allen	30.58°N 92.68°W	1805	0.25 miles (0.40 km)	Brief tornado reported by KPLC-TV damaged a barn.
EF0	S of Oakdale	Elton	30.71°N 92.67°W	1815	7 miles (11 km)	Tornado remained in forested areas damaging trees.
Sources: Storm Reports for October 15, 2009, NWS Lake Charles, NWS Shreveport, NCDC Storm Data

=== October 23 event ===
List of reported tornadoes - Friday, October 23, 2009
EF#	Location	County	Coord.	Time (UTC)	Path length	Damage
Ohio
EF0	Port William	Clinton	39.55°N 83.79°W	2216	500 feet (200 m)	One barn had two broken windows with remainder of damage limited to trees and branches.
Sources: NWS Wilmington, OH, NCDC Storm Data

=== October 26 event ===
List of reported tornadoes - Monday, October 26, 2009
EF#	Location	County	Coord.	Time (UTC)	Path length	Damage
Oregon
EF0	ENE of Oregon City	Clackamas	45.37°N 122.52°W	2210	0.25 miles (0.40 km)	Brief tornado with damage to houses and buildings.
Sources: Storm Reports for October 26, 2009

=== October 27 event ===
List of reported tornadoes - Tuesday, October 27, 2009
EF#	Location	County	Coord.	Time (UTC)	Path length	Damage
Georgia
EF0	NNE of Donald	Long	31.87°N 81.81°W	2156	200 feet (100 m)	Two houses sustained shingle damage.
EF2	SW of Willie	Liberty	32.00°N 81.70°W	2228	1 mile (1.6 km)	Over 850 trees were damaged, many of which were knocked down in a matchstick pattern on Fort Stewart.
Sources: NCDC Storm Data

=== October 29 event ===
List of reported tornadoes - Thursday, October 29, 2009
EF#	Location	County/Parish	Coord.	Time (UTC)	Path length	Damage
Oklahoma
EF0	SW of Weleetka	Okfuskee	35.33°N 96.15°W	1617	0.5 miles (0.80 km)	A few houses lost shingles, and trees and power lines were damaged.
EF0	NE of Dunbar	Pushmataha	34.50°N 95.50°W	1914	1 mile (1.6 km)	Numerous trees were snapped or uprooted.
Louisiana
EF1	Haughton area	Bossier	32.54°N 93.56°W	1750	2.5 miles (4.0 km)	30 homes were damaged in the Eastwood area from both direct structural damage and fallen trees and many trees were damaged, closing Interstate 20 in the area. Eight people were injured.
EF0	Hall Summit area	Red River, Bienville	32.18°N 93.30°W	1829	4.5 miles (7.2 km)	Several broken large tree limbs in a forested area.
EF0	S of Bernice	Union	32.76°N 92.66°W	1833	4 miles (6.4 km)	Roof damage to a home and a car wash.
EF0	SW of Blanchard	Caddo	32.57°N 93.90°W	2016	3 miles (4.8 km)	Damage limited to trees in a forested area.
EF0	SW of Belcher	Caddo	32.69°N 93.86°W	2025	1 mile (1.6 km)	Damage limited to trees.
EF0	SW of Plain Dealing	Bossier	32.96°N 93.76°W	2053	4.5 miles (7.2 km)	Damage limited to trees.
EF2	Shreveport/Bossier City	Caddo, Bossier	32.47°N 93.80°W	2113	13 miles (21 km)	Tornado toppled a church steeple and damaged businesses and the convention center in downtown Shreveport - the second tornado to hit the downtown area in 2009 - where damage was rated EF1. EF2 damage was noted in nearby Bossier City in several subdivisions. Over 100 houses and many businesses were damaged in Bossier Parish as well as the Bossier Emergency Service Center. Three people were injured.
EF0	SE of Oil City	Caddo	32.71°N 93.96°W	2352	0.5 miles (0.80 km)	Several trees were uprooted.
EF0	SE of Vivian	Caddo	32.83°N 93.95°W	0004	0.5 miles (0.80 km)	Several trees were uprooted. One indirect fatality occurred when the driver of the car hit a downed tree.
EF0	SE of Stonewall	Caddo	32.26°N 93.89°W	0028	0.5 miles (0.80 km)	Several trees were uprooted in a forest and an oil field.
EF0	SE of Haynesville	Claiborne	32.86°N 93.02°W	0049	5 miles (8.0 km)	Damage limited to trees.
EF0	W of Shongaloo	Webster	32.94°N 93.34°W	0142	2 miles (3.2 km)	Damage limited to trees.
Arkansas
EF0	NE of Junction City	Union	33.08°N 92.55°W	1855	1.5 miles (2.4 km)	Damage to tree limbs with three downed trees.
EF1	SW of Smackover (1st tornado)	Union, Ouachita, Calhoun	33.35°N 92.78°W	2007	25 miles (40 km)	Several trees were snapped or uprooted by a long track, large wedge tornado. Several roofs were damaged in Ouachita County as well as structural damage at Southern Arkansas University Tech. Nine trailers were destroyed with major damage to three others.
EF1	SW of Smackover (2nd tornado)	Union	33.29°N 92.84°W	2013	1.5 miles (2.4 km)	Several trees were snapped or uprooted damaging four houses.
EF2	NE of East Camden	Calhoun, Ouachita	33.63°N 92.67°W	2045	10.9 miles (17.5 km)	Large wedge tornado with major structural damage to the Arkansas Fire Training Academy and roof damage to homes and businesses in an industrial park.
EF1	SW of Ramsey	Dallas	33.82°N 92.58°W	2100	5.05 miles (8.13 km)	A barn was damaged and power poles and hundreds of trees were downed.
EF1	SW of Junet	Grant	34.32°N 92.23°W	2204	2 miles (3.2 km)	Thousands of trees were knocked down.
EF1	SE of Bonneville	Scott, Logan	34.96°N 93.91°W	2226	8 miles (13 km)	Thousands of trees were downed at the Ouachita National Forest. Several barns and sheds were also damaged.
EF1	Magnolia area (1st tornado)	Columbia	33.27°N 93.24°W	2234	1.5 miles (2.4 km)	Minor damage to houses and one business.
EF1	Magnolia area (2nd tornado)	Columbia	33.27°N 93.24°W	2239	1.5 miles (2.4 km)	Major damage to mobile homes and power lines. A residential shop was damaged by fallen trees. One person was injured.
EF0	S of Scott	Lonoke	34.68°N 92.06°W	2259	3 miles (4.8 km)	Damage limited to trees as the tornado primarily remained over farm country.
EF2	Amy area	Ouachita, Dallas	33.65°N 92.94°W	2327	25.75 miles (41.44 km)	Long track, large wedge tornado heavily damaged two houses and destroyed several outbuildings. Extensive and widespread tree damage.
EF1	Magnolia area (3rd tornado)	Columbia	33.27°N 93.24°W	2333	7.5 miles (12.1 km)	One house was damaged and a tree fell on a vehicle.
EF1	NW of Turin	Grant	34.27°N 92.52°W	0045	1 mile (1.6 km)	A house, shed, mobile home and amateur radio antenna were damaged.
EF0	NE of Emerson	Columbia	33.10°N 93.20°W	0110	3 miles (4.8 km)	Damage limited to trees.
EF1	S of Pine Bluff	Jefferson	34.16°N 92.01°W	0352	2.6 miles (4.2 km)	Damage at a discount store, a gas station, two restaurants and a car dealership where two cars flipped and an 18-wheeler was overturned. A shed and a carport were destroyed while a church and several homes were damaged. Four people were injured.
Texas
EF0	NW of Elysian Fields	Harrison	32.38°N 94.25°W	1927	1.5 miles (2.4 km)	Several trees were snapped and uprooted.
EF0	NW of Gary City	Panola	32.05°N 94.42°W	2144	4 miles (6.4 km)	Damage limited to trees.
EF0	SW of Texarkana	Bowie	33.34°N 94.19°W	0002	4 miles (6.4 km)	Damage limited to trees.
Sources: Storm Reports for October 29, 2009, NWS Shreveport, NWS Little Rock #1, NWS Little Rock #2, NWS Little Rock (monthly summary), NCDC Storm Data

=== October 30 event ===
List of reported tornadoes - Friday, October 30, 2009
EF#	Location	County/Parish	Coord.	Time (UTC)	Path length	Damage
Alabama
EF1	SW of Haleyville	Marion	34.17°N 87.67°W	2224	2.8 miles (4.5 km)	Four homes and three outbuildings were damaged along with 25 trees.
Sources: Storm Reports for October 30, 2009, NWS Birmingham, NCDC Storm Data

== See also ==
- Tornadoes of 2009
- List of United States tornadoes from July to August 2009
- List of United States tornadoes from November to December 2009
