= List of United States tornadoes from January to March 2010 =

This is a list of all tornadoes that were confirmed by local offices of the National Weather Service in the United States from January to March 2010.

== United States yearly total ==
Confirmed tornadoes by Enhanced Fujita rating
EFU	EF0	EF1	EF2	EF3	EF4	EF5	Total
0	768	342	127	32	13	0	1,282

== January ==
Confirmed tornadoes by Enhanced Fujita rating
EFU	EF0	EF1	EF2	EF3	EF4	EF5	Total
0	17	8	4	1	0	0	30

=== January 18 event ===
List of confirmed tornadoes – Monday, January 18, 2010 (Note: All dates are based on the local time zone where the tornado touched down; however, all times are in Coordinated Universal Time for consistency.)
EF#	Location	County / Parish	State	Start Coord.	Time (UTC)	Path length	Max width	Damage (Note: All damage totals are in 2010 USD unless otherwise stated.)	Summary	Refs
EF0	West Fresno	Fresno	CA	36.73°N 119.86°W	2324 – 2330	0.53 mi (0.85 km)	15 yd (14 m)	$0	A trained storm spotter observed a tornado north of California State Route 180; no damage was reported.	

=== January 19 event ===
List of confirmed tornadoes – Tuesday, January 19, 2010
EF#	Location	County / Parish	State	Start Coord.	Time (UTC)	Path length	Max width	Damage	Summary	Refs
EF0	Isla Vista	Santa Barbara	CA	34.4248°N 119.877°W	1832 – 1836	0.14 mi (0.23 km)	10 yd (9.1 m)	$0	Law enforcement reported a small tornado; only minor damage was observed.	
EF1	S of Seal Beach	Orange	CA	33.716°N 118.125°W	2055 – 2059	4.62 mi (7.44 km)	25 yd (23 m)	$500,000	A parked Ford Explorer was flipped on its side. Two catamarans were lifted out of the water; one was tossed 50 ft (15 m) into the air, subsequently landing on another vessel and dock piling, and the second was flipped over, landing 30 ft (9.1 m) from its original position. A window to a residential building was blown in and multiple reports of roof damage were relayed. A mesonet station on the Huntington Beach Pier recorded a 92 mph (148 km/h) wind gust.	

=== January 20 event ===
List of confirmed tornadoes – Wednesday, January 20, 2010
EF#	Location	County / Parish	State	Start Coord.	Time (UTC)	Path length	Max width	Summary
EF0	NW of Le Moyen	St. Landry	LA	30.815°N 92.0455°W	21:27–21:28	0.16 mi (0.26 km)	25 yd (23 m)	A storm chaser observed a brief tornado; no damage was observed.
EF1	NW of Milam	Sabine	TX	31.5095°N 93.9232°W	22:26–22:32	0.79 mi (1.27 km)	150 yd (140 m)	Numerous large trees were snapped, toppled, or uprooted. One home had a majority of its shingles blown off while a second had its storage shed completely destroyed.
EF3	NW of Waskom, TX to SW of Blanchard, LA	Harrison (TX), Caddo (LA)	TX, LA	32.4869°N 94.1689°W	23:18–23:59	15.56 mi (25.04 km)	1,087 yd (994 m)	The tornado began in Harrison County, Texas, destroying a metal building and a mobile home. One residence was completely destroyed with only a few interior walls remaining, while a second sustained major damage to its roof and carport. The roof to a grocery store was peeled back, the walls were blown out of a large warehouse, and additional metal buildings were damaged. Many trees were uprooted or snapped, some close to the base. In Caddo Parish, additional trees were snapped or uprooted.
EF2	Canton to SE of Grand Saline	Van Zandt	TX	32.571°N 95.8725°W	23:19–23:45	15.17 mi (24.41 km)	100 yd (91 m)	A total of 150 homes suffered damage, including one that lost its entire roof and a portion of its exterior walls. Several sheds and outbuildings sustained extensive damage, a small church was destroyed, and several large trees were uprooted. One injury was reported.
EF0	NW of Hagewood	Natchitoches	LA	31.7667°N 93.2623°W	23:48–00:06	4.6 mi (7.4 km)	300 yd (270 m)	Several large trees were toppled, uprooted, or had their tops snapped off, and several limbs were broken off.
EF0	NW of Ridgeland	Madison	MS	32.4755°N 90.2386°W	00:01–00:04	0.96 mi (1.54 km)	40 yd (37 m)	Numerous trees, two power lines, and a few fences were damaged or blown down. A home was damaged by a fallen tree.
EF2	S of LaRue	Henderson	TX	32.0649°N 95.6903°W	00:20–00:22	0.9 mi (1.4 km)	200 yd (180 m)	A total of seven homes were damaged, including some that had their exterior walls collapsed. A church sustained extensive damage.
EF0	SW of Sulphur Springs	Hopkins	TX	33.0531°N 95.7142°W	00:22–00:29	5.42 mi (8.72 km)	50 yd (46 m)	A mobile home was destroyed, injuring two occupants, and a pre-fabricated metal building sustained considerable damage.
EF1	N of Poynor	Henderson	TX	32.0872°N 95.6296°W	00:23–00:28	3 mi (4.8 km)	100 yd (91 m)	A mobile home was dislodged, a wood-frame home sustained significant damage, and tree damage was noted.
EF0	E of Sulphur Springs	Hopkins	TX	33.1321°N 95.56°W	00:35–00:40	1.35 mi (2.17 km)	50 yd (46 m)	Approximately 50 homes sustained various degrees of roof damage; two were severely damaged after being impaled by large tree branches.
EF1	N of Loranger	Tangipahoa	LA	30.6831°N 90.393°W	00:55–01:00	1.66 mi (2.67 km)	150 yd (140 m)	An outbuilding and house were damaged, a barn was destroyed, and 10 to 15 trees were toppled or uprooted.
EF0	Flint area	Smith	TX	32.1923°N 95.3492°W	00:58–01:00	1.48 mi (2.38 km)	75 yd (69 m)	Several homes sustained minor damage or had their shingles peeled off, a trampoline was thrown onto a home, and sporadic tree damage was observed.
EF1	NW of Whitehouse	Smith	TX	32.24°N 95.268°W	01:09–01:10	0.47 mi (0.76 km)	75 yd (69 m)	A small metal garage had a couple of its walls blown out, a small barn was completely destroyed, tin roof panels were pulled from an outbuilding, and several trees and tree limbs were snapped.
EF1	Harleton	Harrison	TX	32.6735°N 94.5777°W	01:44–01:46	0.31 mi (0.50 km)	50 yd (46 m)	Several trees were uprooted, two brick buildings sustained minor roof and structural damage, and a grocery store sustained roof and awning damage.

=== January 21 event ===
Events in California were associated with January 2010 North American winter storms.

List of confirmed tornadoes – Thursday, January 21, 2010
EF#	Location	County / Parish	State	Start Coord.	Time (UTC)	Path length	Max width	Summary
EF2	SE of Hazlehurst	Copiah	MS	31.8343°N 90.3799°W	06:50–06:55	3.61 mi (5.81 km)	500 yd (460 m)	Numerous trees were snapped or uprooted. A barn was leveled, numerous outbuildings were heavily damaged or destroyed, several chicken houses were damaged, including one that collapsed, and a number of power lines were downed.
EF0	Saint George	Charlton	GA	30.5172°N 82.0508°W	17:45–17:47	0.84 mi (1.35 km)	200 yd (180 m)	A post office, several mobile homes, and a number of buildings sustained minor damage. A trailer at a cafe and several other vehicles were damaged by falling trees or tree limbs. A crossing arm at an intersection was blown off.
EF0	N of St. George	Charlton	GA	30.5363°N 82.0404°W	17:50–17:51	0.15 mi (0.24 km)	100 yd (91 m)	A mobile home sustained significant damage.
EF0	SW of Callahan	Nassau	FL	30.56°N 81.83°W	18:10–18:11	0.14 mi (0.23 km)	100 yd (91 m)	Semi-tractor trailers were overturned or tossed into trees.
EF1	N of Starke	Bradford, Clay	FL	29.9914°N 82.1998°W	18:22–18:30	8.96 mi (14.42 km)	400 yd (370 m)	A tornado began in Bradford County, Florida and ended in Clay County, destroying 23 houses, inflicting major damage to 28 houses, and causing minor damage to 25 houses.
EF0	Ventura	Ventura	CA	34.2518°N 119.1949°W	20:25–20:28	1.51 mi (2.43 km)	67 yd (61 m)	Several homes, a car, and an outbuilding were damaged.
EF0	E of Sewanee to Monteagle	Franklin, Marion	TN	35.2017°N 85.8919°W	22:58–23:15	2.46 mi (3.96 km)	300 yd (270 m)	One house sustained significant structural damage after its chimney and carport were destroyed, and several others sustained minor damage. Numerous trees were snapped or uprooted.
EF0	WSW of Ripley to NNE of Blythe	Riverside	CA	33.5105°N 114.7453°W	23:10–23:40	14.26 mi (22.95 km)	100 yd (91 m)	Two semi-trucks were blown over, numerous power poles were downed, and several structures sustained considerable damage, including some houses that had their roofs blown off.
EF2	Huntsville	Madison	AL	34.7°N 86.6398°W	23:15–23:35	6.6 mi (10.6 km)	150 yd (140 m)	Multiple softwood and hardwood trees were snapped or uprooted, many utility poles were snapped, and multiple well-built single-family homes sustained substantial roof damage. A tree fell on a truck, injuring the two teenagers inside, and another truck was thrown approximately 30 yd (27 m) into the porch of a residence, injuring the driver.
EF0	NW of Jasper	Marion	TN	35.11°N 85.69°W	23:48	0.2 mi (0.32 km)	30 yd (27 m)	A few trees were snapped.

=== January 22 event ===
List of confirmed tornadoes – Friday, January 22, 2010
EF#	Location	County / Parish	State	Start Coord.	Time (UTC)	Path length	Max width	Summary
EF0	Viera	Brevard	FL	28.2537°N 80.7246°W	12:38–12:49	7.34 mi (11.81 km)	265 yd (242 m)	A tornado touched down just east of Interstate 95, inflicting minor damage to 143 homes in Viera, causing minor damage to six homes in Merritt Island, resulting in minor damage to four apartment units and several vehicles in Cocoa Beach, and toppling or snapping numerous trees. One person sustained minor injuries due to flying glass and debris.

=== January 23 event ===
List of confirmed tornadoes – Saturday, January 23, 2010
EF#	Location	County / Parish	State	Start Coord.	Time (UTC)	Path length	Max width	Damage	Summary	Refs
EF1	SW of Brentwood	Contra Costa	CA	37.9132°N 121.7658°W	2054 – 2055	1.64 mi (2.64 km)	2 yd (1.8 m)	$25,000	A utility pole was twisted, with the top portion of the pole splintered.	

=== January 24 event ===
List of confirmed tornadoes – Sunday, January 24, 2010
EF#	Location	County / Parish	State	Start Coord.	Time (UTC)	Path length	Max width	Summary
EF0	NW of Springfield	Robertson	TN	36.5505°N 86.9132°W	21:40–21:55	3.6 mi (5.8 km)	50 yd (46 m)	The roof to a greenhouse was damaged, the roof was ripped off a barn, and a small shed was destroyed. Some farm equipment was damaged, and a few trees were snapped.

== February ==
Confirmed tornadoes by Enhanced Fujita rating
EFU	EF0	EF1	EF2	EF3	EF4	EF5	Total
0	1	0	0	0	0	0	1

=== February 27 event ===
List of confirmed tornadoes – Saturday, February 27, 2010
EF#	Location	County / Parish	State	Start Coord.	Time (UTC)	Path length	Max width	Summary
EF0	E of Tupman	Kern	CA	35.3°N 119.27°W	00:45–00:48	0.5 mi (0.80 km)	20 yd (18 m)	A trained storm spotter reported a weak tornado; no damage was observed. This was the only tornado recorded in the United States in February 2010.

== March ==
Confirmed tornadoes by Enhanced Fujita rating
EFU	EF0	EF1	EF2	EF3	EF4	EF5	Total
0	13	15	5	1	0	0	34

=== March 8 event ===
List of confirmed tornadoes – Monday, March 8, 2010
EF#	Location	County / Parish	State	Start Coord.	Time (UTC)	Path length	Max width	Summary
EF2	Hammon area	Roger Mills, Custer	OK	35.5635°N 99.4618°W	23:20–00:00	9.48 mi (15.26 km)	100 yd (91 m)	A long-track tornado began in Roger Mills County, Oklahoma, inflicting major damage to a couple of trailers, the county barn, and a home. Additional trees, buildings, cars, and utility poles sustained significant damage.
EF0	N of Butler	Custer	OK	35.7413°N 99.19°W	00:16–00:18	0.1 mi (0.16 km)	10 yd (9.1 m)	A brief tornado was confirmed through video evidence; no known damage occurred.
EF0	Chrome	Glenn	CA	39.73°N 122.55°W	00:25–00:30	0.25 mi (0.40 km)	20 yd (18 m)	The roof of a barn was peeled back, and a small trailer suffered minor damage.

=== March 10 event ===
List of confirmed tornadoes – Wednesday, March 10, 2010
EF#	Location	County / Parish	State	Start Coord.	Time (UTC)	Path length	Max width	Summary
EF0	NW of Ozan	Hempstead	AR	33.91°N 93.7°W	22:17–22:23	2.37 miles (3.81 km)	50 yd (46 m)	Damage to trees and power lines.
EF0	S of Yellow Pine	Washington	AL	31.39°N 88.43°W	00:20–00:25	0.56 mi (0.90 km)	500 yd (460 m)	Rain wrapped tornado caused some minor tree damage.
EF1	NW of Benton	Saline	AR	34.5898°N 92.6561°W	00:26–02:36	6.12 mi (9.85 km)	400 yd (370 m)	Two houses were destroyed and 20 others were damaged, two heavily. A fire station was also damaged.
EF1	Center Hill area	White	AR	35.2398°N 91.9072°W	02:19–02:48	13.24 mi (21.31 km)	400 yd (370 m)	One house, one business and two mobile homes were destroyed and about 20 other houses were damaged, some heavily. A church and a fire station were also damaged. Two people were injured.
EF1	NW of Steprock	White	AR	35.2398°N 91.9072°W	02:53–03:00	2.91 mi (4.68 km)	100 yd (91 m)	A garage and two sheds were destroyed. Many trees were damaged.
EF2	Pearson area	Cleburne	AR	35.3969°N 92.1422°W	03:09–03:14	3.43 mi (5.52 km)	300 yd (270 m)	1 death — A house and a mobile home were destroyed, along with outbuildings, trees and power lines. Eight other houses were damaged. The fatality occurred in the destroyed house. Three others were injured, including one in a nearby vehicle. First killer US tornado in 2010.
EF1	W of Hutson	Independence	AR	35.6273°N 91.5308°W	03:30–03:31	0.91 mi (1.46 km)	100 yd (91 m)	Three chicken houses were destroyed, killing or letting loose over 80,000 chickens. Two sheds and a grain elevator were destroyed.
EF1	N of Westphalia	Osage	MO	38.4397°N 92.0278°W	04:25–04:31	6.61 mi (10.64 km)	60 yd (55 m)	Several houses and farm buildings were damaged, and many trees were snapped or uprooted.
EF0	W of Mokane	Callaway	MO	38.6639°N 91.9251°W	04:34–04:35	0.79 mi (1.27 km)	40 yd (37 m)	A small utility building was damaged and trees were damaged.
EF0	NW of Mokane	Callaway	MO	38.6892°N 91.8983°W	04:36–04:39	3.71 mi (5.97 km)	40 yd (37 m)	Minor damage at a school complex and a few trees were uprooted.
EF1	SE of Doniphan	Ripley	MO	36.5925°N 90.7902°W	05:30–05:32	1.47 mi (2.37 km)	180 yd (160 m)	A rental business building was heavily damaged and a camper was rolled. Several barns and outbuildings were also damaged. One person sustained minor injuries.

=== March 11 event ===
List of confirmed tornadoes –Thursday, March 11, 2010
EF#	Location	County / Parish	State	Start Coord.	Time (UTC)	Path length	Max width	Summary
EF1	NE of Morton	Scott	MS	32.4158°N 89.5848°W	09:05–09:12	5.27 mi (8.48 km)	400 yd (370 m)	Tornado touched down in Bienville National Forest. Many trees were knocked down or damaged, and a carport was also damaged.
EF1	W of Hillsboro	Scott	MS	32.45°N 89.56°W	09:09–09:11	1.31 mi (2.11 km)	250 yd (230 m)	Many pine trees were snapped or uprooted.
EF0	N of Chassahowitzka	Citrus	FL	28.7309°N 82.5822°W	19:23–19:25	1.5 mi (2.4 km)	30 yd (27 m)	Tornado remained in a wooded area with damage to trees.
EF0	E of Auburndale	Polk	FL	28.0808°N 81.7801°W	21:50–21:52	0.36 mi (0.58 km)	20 yd (18 m)	A few power lines were damaged.
EF1	SE of Haines City	Polk	FL	28.069°N 81.5591°W	21:53–21:57	1.41 mi (2.27 km)	70 yd (64 m)	A total of 28 buildings were damaged, including at least 8 multi-family condos. Most of the damage was to weaker roofs.

=== March 12 event ===
List of confirmed tornadoes – Friday, March 12, 2010
EF#	Location	County / Parish	State	Start Coord.	Time (UTC)	Path length	Max width	Summary
EF0	S of Unadilla	Dooly	GA	32.23°N 83.75°W	21:48–21:49	1.53 mi (2.46 km)	100 yd (91 m)	A downed tree caused minor damage to the corner of a house. Another nearby home lost a few of its shingles, tin roofing was torn from a portion of one row of horse stalls, a large billboard was blown over onto a car, and a tree top was broken out.

=== March 25 event ===
List of confirmed tornadoes – Thursday, March 25, 2010
EF#	Location	County / Parish	State	Start Coord.	Time (UTC)	Path length	Max width	Summary
EF1	S of Danville	Morgan	AL	34.36°N 87.085°W	22:40–22:50	2.86 mi (4.60 km)	50 yd (46 m)	A mobile home was flipped upside down, a small barn was completely destroyed, two chicken houses sustained significant loss of roofing and siding panels, a portion of a roof was lifted off a warehouse building as the front of the facility collapsed, and several large trees were snapped.
EF1	Maylene area	Shelby	AL	33.2391°N 86.867°W	00:02–00:07	2.74 mi (4.41 km)	100 yd (91 m)	At least 20 structures were damaged, including several homes that sustained minor to significant roof damage, one home that had its siding stripped off, and one house that had its garage door blown out. Trampolines were tossed, fencing was damaged, and dozens of trees were snapped or uprooted.
EF1	Clanton	Chilton	AL	32.8472°N 86.6814°W	00:59–01:05	2.75 mi (4.43 km)	200 yd (180 m)	At least five structures sustained damage, mainly in the form of removed shingles. A large storage building was destroyed with its debris tossed upwards of 1.5 mi (2.4 km) downstream, a garage and a gazebo were heavily damaged, and numerous softwood and hardwood trees were snapped or uprooted.

=== March 28 event ===
List of confirmed tornadoes –Sunday, March 28, 2010
EF#	Location	County / Parish	State	Start Coord.	Time (UTC)	Path length	Max width	Summary
EF1	ENE of Woodlawn to SW of Edgefield	McCormick, Edgefield	SC	33.633°N 82.119°W	21:06–21:25	13.35 mi (21.48 km)	110 yd (100 m)	A tornado took down numerous trees along its path, including in the Sumter National Forest.
EF1	Belmont	Gaston	NC	35.2346°N 81.0166°W	21:37–21:38	0.13 mi (0.21 km)	100 yd (91 m)	A brief tornado touched down and damaged a mill before moving into a mobile home park, damaging several homes and downing numerous trees.
EF0	West Eau Gallie	Brevard	FL	28.119°N 80.7135°W	22:00–22:04	2.31 mi (3.72 km)	200 yd (180 m)	A weak tornado crossed I-95 into West Eau Gallie, snapping tree branches and palm fronds. Minor damage also occurred to two structures.
EF2	Spencer to ENE of Lakeview	Rowan, Davidson	NC	35.691°N 80.431°W	22:46–22:55	5 mi (8.0 km)	200 yd (180 m)	A tornado touched down in Spencer, just east of the town center. When it touched down, the facade and roof of a shopping center was damaged. The tornado moved northeast through town, causing minor roof damage to several homes and blowing the awning off a business. A brick chimney was blown off a home as well. A shed and boat awning were destroyed as well. The tornado exited Spencer and crossed I-85 and then crossed the Yadkin River into Davidson County. As soon as it made landfall again, the tornado sheared off or uprooted numerous trees. A carport was ripped from a home and two outbuildings were destroyed. Continuing northeast, the tornado damaged a vacant flea market building, twisting the debris around several trees and high tension power lines. The tornado then reached peak intensity and completely destroyed three mobile homes before severely damaging an additional three more. The tornado then dissipated in a wooded area shortly after reaching peak intensity. Five injuries occurred.
EF1	W of High Point	Davidson	NC	35.9616°N 80.0875°W	23:15–23:20	0.83 mi (1.34 km)	50 yd (46 m)	A tornado touched down in a wooded area causing extensive tree damage. It then moved northeast and ripped a carport off of a home. The tornado struck Valley Mobile Home Park, completely destroying or damaging approximately twenty mobile homes. One of the mobile homes and an SUV were thrown into a nearby lake.
EF3	High Point	Guilford	NC	36.0049°N 80.0396°W	23:30–23:40	3.46 mi (5.57 km)	250 yd (230 m)	See section on this tornado
EF0	NNW of Alton	Halifax	VA	36.578°N 79.003°W	02:02–02:03	0.23 mi (0.37 km)	100 yd (91 m)	Several old farm buildings and outbuildings had minor roof and siding damage. One large trees was snapped.
EF2	NNE of Morgana to SSW of Ropers Crossroads	Edgefield	SC	33.629°N 82.042°W	02:24–02:39	2.39 mi (3.85 km)	440 yd (400 m)	A strong tornado occurred in the southern area of the Sumter National Forest near Stevens Creek. Numerous trees and powerlines were downed, two homes suffered moderate damage and a mobile home had half of its roof torn off. A RV was crushed from a tree falling on it.
EF2	WSW of Ridge Road Crossroads to Lake Murray	Lexington	SC	33.9932°N 81.5013°W	03:25–03:37	5.01 mi (8.06 km)	440 yd (400 m)	Approximately forty homes were damaged along with several trees and power lines downed. Several vehicles were also damaged, with one injury occurring from that. A horse was also killed when a portion of a barn collapsed.
EF1	S of Mount Tirzah to SW of Peeds Store	Person	NC	36.2677°N 78.9007°W	03:55–04:05	4.05 mi (6.52 km)	75 yd (69 m)	A tornado touched down, initially snapping multiple trees before striking a subdivision. Several trees were uprooted in the subdivision, along with two modular homes having trees fall onto them. The tornado reached peak intensity exiting the subdivision, snapping numerous pine and hardwood trees and moving a modular home off its foundation. The tornado then moved into a wooded area, producing minor damage to an old barn before dissipating.
EF0	SW of Rion	Fairfield	SC	34.26°N 81.18°W	04:03–04:07	2 mi (3.2 km)	60 yd (55 m)	The SCDOT reported trees downed by a tornado.

=== March 29 event ===
List of confirmed tornadoes – Monday, March 29, 2010
EF#	Location	County / Parish	State	Start Coord.	Time (UTC)	Path length	Max width	Summary
EF0	Oakland Park	Broward	FL	26.1716°N 80.1662°W	12:26–12:37	2.43 mi (3.91 km)	100 yd (91 m)	A tornado touched down in the Royal Palm Isles neighborhood of Oakland Park and quickly crossed I-95 and moving through town, damaging trailers, cars, trees and some roofs. The tornado lifted in the Coral Heights neighborhood.

== See also ==
- Tornadoes of 2010
- List of United States tornadoes from November to December 2009
- List of United States tornadoes in April 2010
