= Lost Camp Creek =

Stream in southern Missouri, U.S.

Lost Camp Creek is a stream in north-central Howell County in the Ozarks of southern Missouri. It is a tributary of the Eleven Point River.

The stream headwaters arise just to the north of the community of Burnham at 36°56′55″N 91°57′15″W and approximately four miles south of Willow Springs. The stream flows to the east-southeast passing under US Route 63 and continues for approximately ten miles to its confluence with the Eleven Point River just to the east of Missouri Route 17 and 6.5 miles southwest of Mountain View at 36°54′34″N 91°46′18″W.

The name of the stream relates to some person or group being lost in the area according to a variety of sources.
