= Roads End State Recreation Site =

State recreation area in Oregon, USA

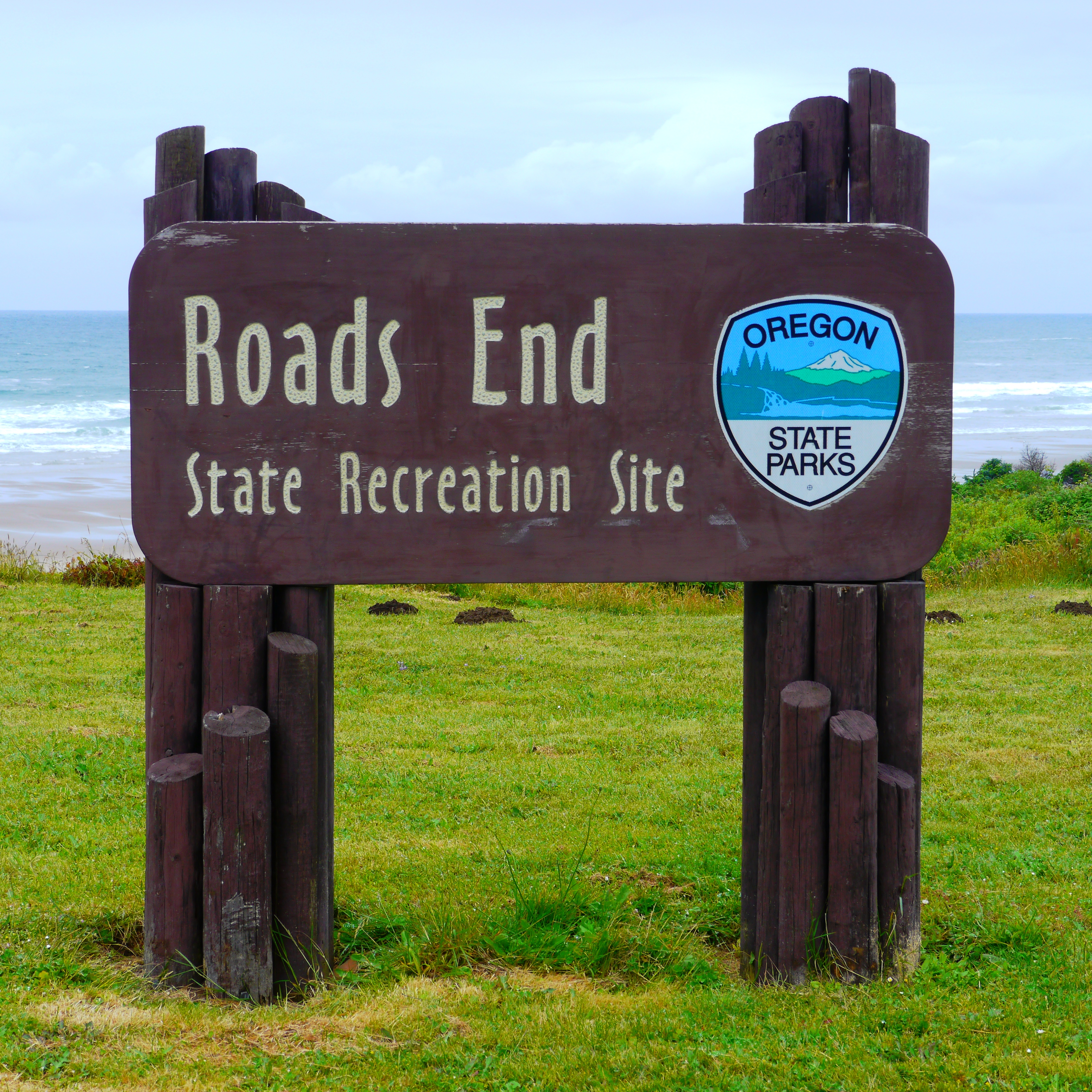
- Roads End State Recreation Site Sign

- Location within Oregon Location within the United States
- Type: Public, state
- Location: Lincoln County, Oregon
- Nearest city: Lincoln City
- Coordinates: 45°00′29″N 124°00′34″W
- Operator: Oregon Parks and Recreation Department

Roads End State Recreation Site is a state park in the U.S. state of Oregon, administered by the Oregon Parks and Recreation Department.

== See also ==
- List of Oregon state parks
