= Willie, Georgia =

Coordinates: 32°0′50″N 81°40′00″W

Willie
- Ghost town
- Interactive map of Willie
- Country: United States
- State: Georgia
- County: Liberty
- Founded: 1911

Population (1940)
  - Total: 192

Willie is an extinct town in Liberty County, in the U.S. state of Georgia. The GNIS classifies it as a populated place.

== History ==
A post office called Willie was established in 1911, and remained in operation until 1914. The community was named after Nellie Willie Lee Tuten, the child of a first settler.

The hamlet of Willie disappeared when the town site was seized for the creation of a military installation. Residents were evacuated in the 1940s. Today, the former town site is within the borders of Fort Stewart.

== Gallery ==
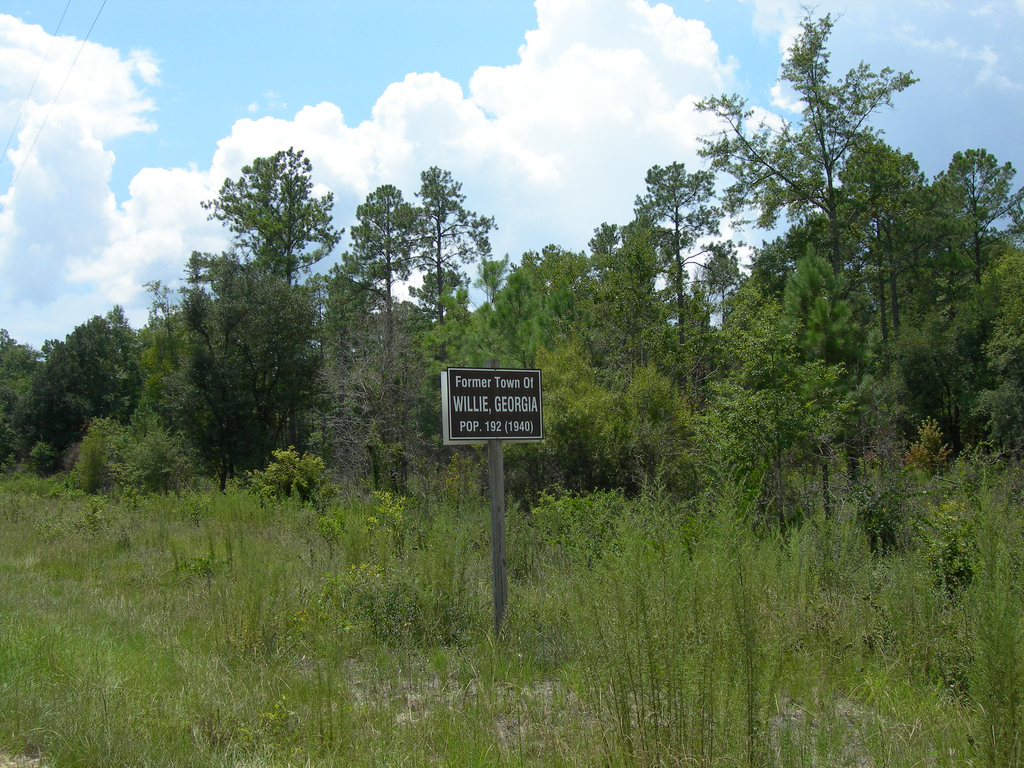
Historical marker at the site

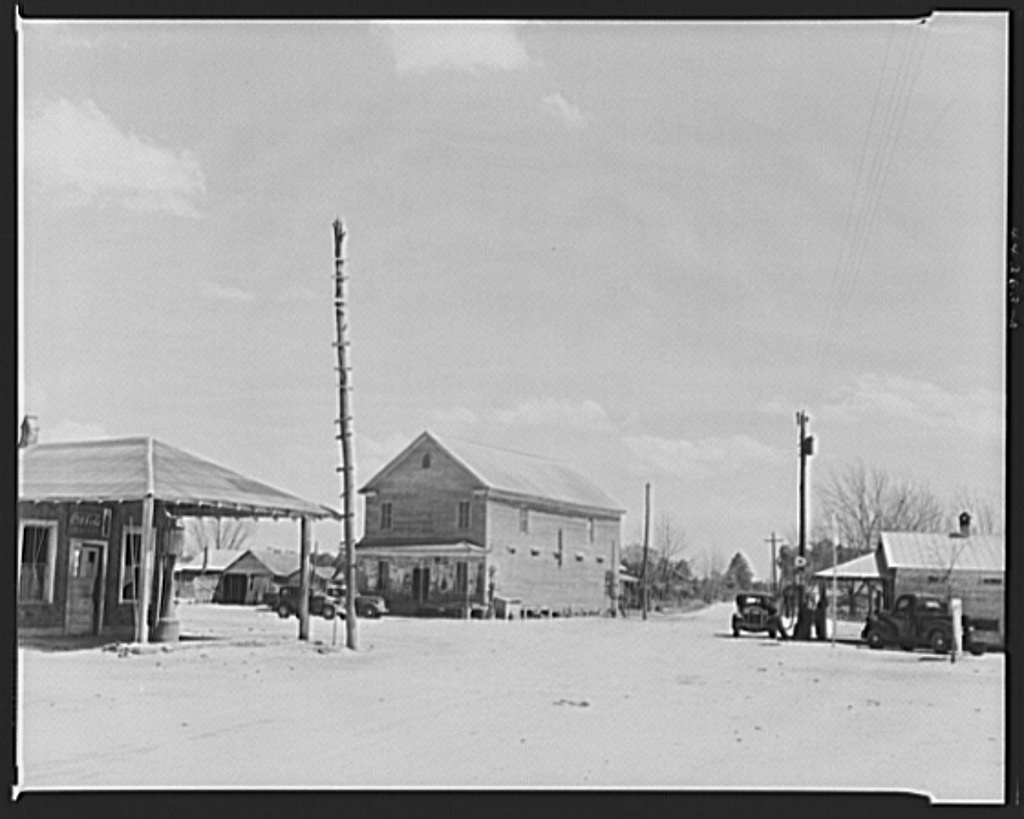
Willie in April 1941
