= Firstview, Colorado =

Unincorporated community in Colorado, U.S.

- Unincorporated community
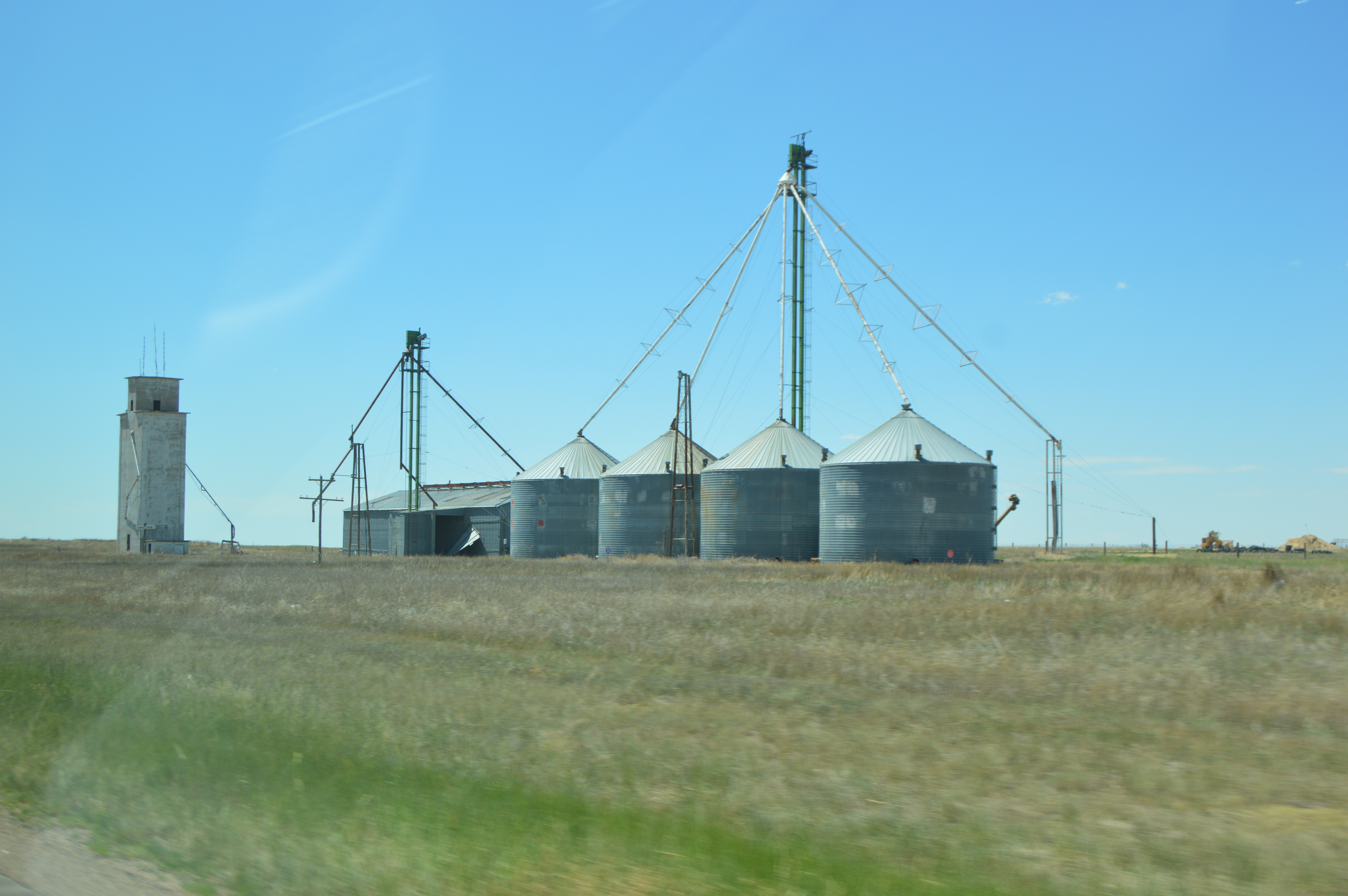
- Grain elevators along U.S. Route 40 (2024)

- Location of Firstview, Colorado. Firstview (Colorado)
- Coordinates: 38°48′57″N 102°32′23″W
- Country: United States
- State: Colorado
- County: Cheyenne

Government
  - Type: Unincorporated community
  - Body: Cheyenne County
- Elevation: 4,577 ft (1,395 m)
- Time zone: UTC−07:00 (MST)
  - Summer (DST): UTC−06:00 (MDT)
- ZIP code: Cheyenne Wells 80810
- Area code: 719
- GNIS place ID: 1947719

Firstview is an unincorporated community located in and governed by Cheyenne County, Colorado, United States. It is located along U.S. Highway 40 west of county seat Cheyenne Wells.

== History ==
The Firstview, Colorado, post office operated from June 25, 1907, until November 24, 1961. The Cheyenne Wells, Colorado, post office (ZIP code 80810) now serves the area.

Firstview was named for the spot where travelers got their first glimpse of Pikes Peak, 135 miles (217 km) to the west.

== See also ==
- List of populated places in Colorado
