= Hardenville, Missouri =

Unincorporated community in Missouri, US

- Community
- Location of Hardenville, Missouri Hardenville, Missouri (the United States)
- Coordinates: 36°35′20″N 92°22′15″W
- Country: U. S. A.
- State: Missouri
- County: Ozark County
- Elevation: 294 m (965 ft)
- Time zone: UTC-6 (CST)
  - Summer (DST): UTC-5 (CDT)

Hardenville is an unincorporated community in eastern Ozark County in southern Missouri, United States. It is located on U.S. Highway 160, approximately five miles east of Gainesville and five miles west of Tecumseh, which is at the north end of Norfork Lake. The community is located on an Ozark ridge at an elevation of 963 feet (294 m).

The Hardenville post office (zip code 65666) was established in 1921. George S. Harden, an early postmaster, gave the community his last name.
