= Merrimac, Illinois =

- Unincorporated community
- Etymology: Meramec River
- Location within Illinois Location within the United States
- Coordinates: 38°22′15″N 90°20′00″W
- Country: United States
- State: Illinois
- County: Monroe
- Precinct: 15
- Elevation: 404 ft (123 m)
- Time zone: UTC-6 (CST)
  - Summer (DST): UTC-5 (CDT)
- Postal code: 62295
- Area code: 618

Merrimac, Illinois is a small unincorporated community in the historic Moredock Precinct of Monroe County, Illinois, United States. It is located in the American Bottoms, adjacent to the Mississippi River levee due south of that river's confluence with the Meramec. It takes its name from this river whose name was translated as 'Ugly Water' from Algonquian by French Jesuits in the area. However scholars of the language translate it as 'place of strong current', which would certainly seem consistent.
