= Fletcher, Missouri =

Unincorporated community in Missouri, U.S.

Coordinates: 38°09′57″N 90°44′00″W

Fletcher is an unincorporated community in western Jefferson County, Missouri, United States.

The community lies on Calico Creek approximately one-half mile east of the Jefferson-Washington county line. It is located approximately ten miles west of De Soto along Missouri Route H.

A post office called Fletcher has been in operation since 1896. The community was named after Missouri governor Thomas Clement Fletcher (1827–1899), who served 1865–1869.
