= Montello (town), Wisconsin =

Montello, Wisconsin
- Town
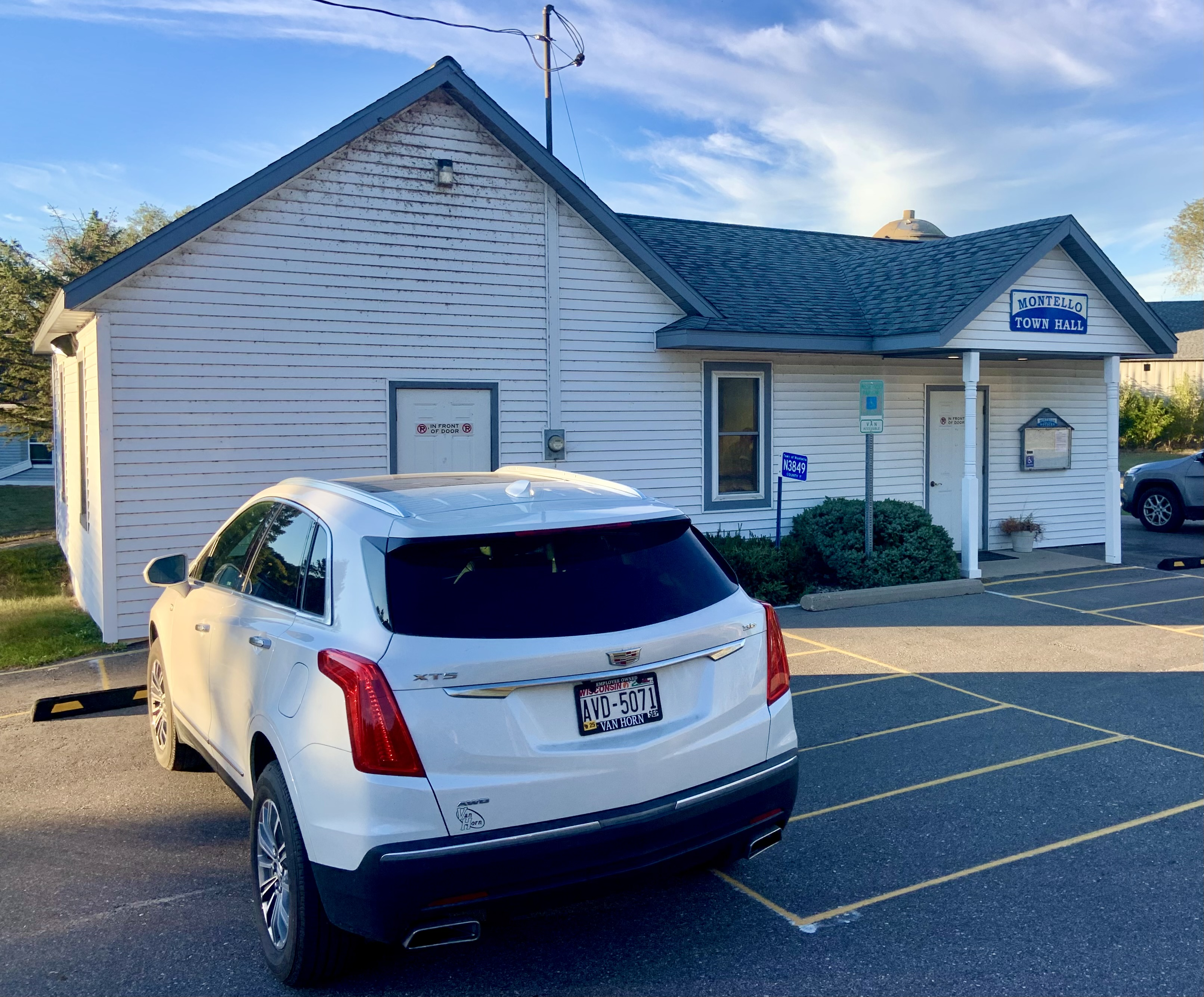
- Town hall

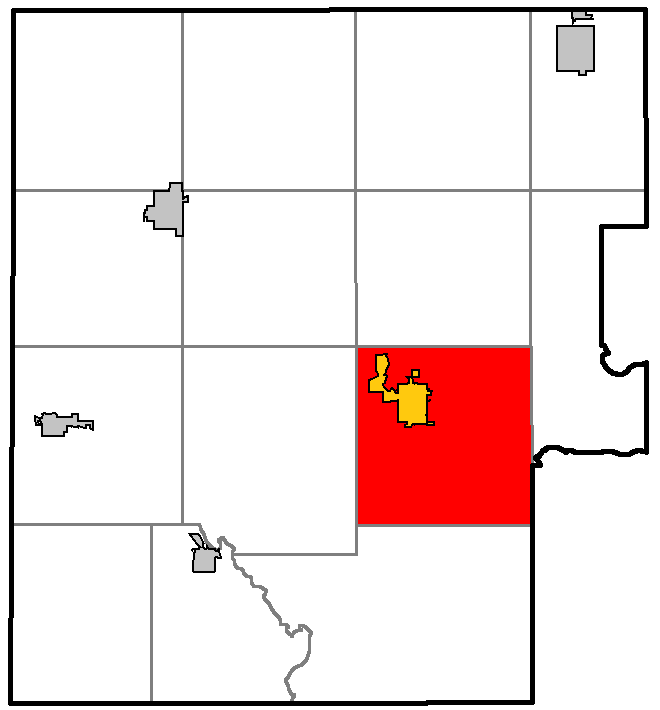
- Location of Montello, Wisconsin

- Location of Marquette County, Wisconsin
- Coordinates: 43°47′1″N 89°18′55″W
- Country: United States
- State: Wisconsin
- County: Marquette

Area
  - Total: 34.0 sq mi (88.1 km^{2})
  - Land: 32.5 sq mi (84.2 km^{2})
  - Water: 1.5 sq mi (3.9 km^{2})
- Elevation: 791 ft (241 m)

Population (2020)
  - Total: 1,132
  - Density: 34.8/sq mi (13.4/km^{2})
- Time zone: UTC-6 (Central (CST))
  - Summer (DST): UTC-5 (CDT)
- Area code: 608
- FIPS code: 55-53900
- GNIS feature ID: 1583744

Montello is a town in Marquette County, Wisconsin, United States. The population was 1,132 at the 2020 census. The City of Montello and the unincorporated community of Glen Oak are located within the town.

== Geography ==
According to the United States Census Bureau, the town has a total area of 34.0 square miles (88.1 km^{2}), of which 32.5 square miles (84.2 km^{2}) is land and 1.5 square miles (3.9 km^{2}) (4.47%) is water.

== Demographics ==
As of the census of 2000, there were 1,043 people, 443 households, and 318 families residing in the town. The population density was 32.1 people per square mile (12.4/km^{2}). There were 699 housing units at an average density of 21.5 per square mile (8.3/km^{2}). The racial makeup of the town was 99.33% White, 0.10% Black or African American, 0.29% Native American, 0.10% from other races, and 0.19% from two or more races. 0.67% of the population were Hispanic or Latino of any race.

There were 443 households, out of which 24.4% had children under the age of 18 living with them, 59.4% were married couples living together, 7.0% had a female householder with no husband present, and 28.2% were non-families. 24.8% of all households were made up of individuals, and 10.2% had someone living alone who was 65 years of age or older. The average household size was 2.31 and the average family size was 2.70.

In the town, the population was spread out, with 20.6% under the age of 18, 5.7% from 18 to 24, 23.0% from 25 to 44, 28.6% from 45 to 64, and 22.1% who were 65 years of age or older. The median age was 46 years. For every 100 females, there were 100.2 males. For every 100 females age 18 and over, there were 100.0 males.

The median income for a household in the town was $35,347, and the median income for a family was $38,542. Males had a median income of $30,882 versus $21,000 for females. The per capita income for the town was $17,699. About 3.5% of families and 6.2% of the population were below the poverty line, including 4.0% of those under age 18 and 9.0% of those age 65 or over.

== Education ==
Most of it is in the Montello School District. A small piece is in the Markesan School District.
