= Cook Station, Missouri =

Unincorporated community in Missouri, US

Coordinates: 37°48′46″N 91°26′17″W

Cook Station is an unincorporated community in southwest Crawford County, Missouri, United States. It is located on the Meramec River, approximately ten miles south of Steelville, along Missouri Route M.

Cook Station had its start in the 1870s when the St. Louis and San Francisco was extended to that point. The community was named after C. C. Cook, a local resident who paid the railroad company in exchange for the naming rights. A post office called Cook Station was established in 1874, and remained in operation until 1998.
