= Burnham, Missouri =

Unincorporated community in Missouri, U.S.

Coordinates: 36°55′36″N 91°57′28″W

Burnham is an unincorporated community in Howell County, in the U.S. state of Missouri. The community is located about midway between Willow Springs and Pomona, approximately one mile west of U.S. Route 63 along the Burlington Northern Santa Fe railroad's Springfield-Memphis line. The headwaters of Lost Camp Creek arise just to the north of the community.

== History ==
Burnham was platted in 1882, and named after C. B. Burnham, a railroad official. A post office called Burnham was established in 1883, and remained in operation until 1951.
