= Lists of tornadoes in the United States =

These are lists of tornadoes in the United States.

== By year ==
- 1946
- 1950
- 1951
- 1952
- 1954
  - April to June
- 1973
  - January to February
  - March
- 1974
  - Super Outbreak
- 1982
  - January to March
- 1990
  - January to February
- 1995
  - May outbreak sequence
- 2000
  - January to February
- 2003
  - January to April
- 2007
  - January to February
  - March
  - April
  - May
  - June to July
  - August to September
  - October to December
- 2008
  - January to February
  - March to April
- 2009
  - January to March
  - April
  - May
  - June
  - July to August
  - September to October
  - November to December
- 2010
  - January to March
  - April
  - May
  - June
  - July
  - August to September
  - October
  - November to December
- 2011
  - January to March
  - April
  - May
  - June
  - July to August
  - September to October
  - November to December
- 2012
  - January to February
  - March
  - April
  - May to June
  - July to September
  - October to December
- 2013
  - January to February
  - March to April
  - May
  - June to July
  - August to October
  - November to December
- 2014
  - January to March
  - April to May
  - June to July
  - August to September
  - October to December
- 2015
  - January to March
  - April
  - May
  - June to August
  - September to October
  - November to December
- 2016
  - January to March
  - April to May
  - June to August
  - September to December
- 2017
  - January to March
  - April
  - May
  - June to July
  - August to October
  - November to December
- 2018
  - January to March
  - April
  - May
  - June to July
  - August to October
  - November to December
- 2019
  - January to March
  - April
  - May (outbreak sequence)
  - June to August
  - September to October
  - November to December
- 2020
  - January to March
  - April
  - May to July
  - August to September
  - October to December
- 2021
  - January to March
  - April to June
  - October to November
  - July to September
  - December
- 2022
  - January to March
  - April
  - May to June
  - July to October
  - November to December
- 2023
  - January to February
  - March
  - April to May
  - June
  - July to August
  - September to December
- 2024
  - January to March
  - April
  - May
  - June to July
  - August to October
  - November to December
- 2025
  - January to March
- 2026
  - January to March
  - April

== By state ==
- Alabama
  - Huntsville
- Alaska
- California
- Connecticut
- Hawaii
- Illinois
- Iowa
- Michigan
- New Jersey
- New York
- Ohio
- Oklahoma
  - 1999 tornado outbreak
  - Cleveland County
- Rhode Island
- Texas
- Washington
- Washington, D.C.
- West Virginia

== Miscellaneous ==
- List of costliest tornadoes in the Americas
- List of deadliest tornadoes in the Americas
- List of tornado emergencies
- List of Storm Prediction Center high risk days
