= List of United States tornadoes from October to December 2007 =

This page documents all the tornadoes that touched down in the United States in October to December 2007. Tornadoes in the month of January are given with their Fujita Scale intensity while all tornadoes from February and on are given with their Enhanced Fujita Scale intensity. This is because the scale was changed on February 1 due to the National Weather Service implementing a more accurate way to classify tornadoes.

== United States Yearly Total ==
Confirmed tornadoes by Enhanced Fujita rating
EFU	EF0	EF1	EF2	EF3	EF4	EF5	Total
0	675	298	91	27	4	1	1,096

- Note: January tornadoes were rated using the old Fujita scale, but are included in the chart above by matching the F rating to the related EF scale rating.

== October ==
Confirmed tornadoes by Enhanced Fujita rating
EFU	EF0	EF1	EF2	EF3	EF4	EF5	Total
0	31	37	16	3	0	0	87

=== October 2 event ===
List of confirmed tornadoes – Tuesday, October 2, 2007 (Note: All dates are based on the local time zone where the tornado touched down; however, all times are in Coordinated Universal Time for consistency.)
EF#	Location	County / Parish	State	Start Coord.	Time (UTC)	Path length	Max width	Summary
EF1	WSW of Memphis	Scotland	MO	40.45°N 92.2017°W	21:25–21:26	0.82 mi (1.32 km)	210 yd (190 m)	Several barns at the county fairgrounds had metal roofs peeled off and doors blown in on several quonset huts. The entry gate building from the race track pits area was totaled and strewn across the grounds. A billboard and fences were also damaged. Several trees and power poles were snapped and numerous branches were broken off trees.
EF1	Des Moines	Polk	IA	41.5832°N 93.6328°W	21:40–21:41	0.44 mi (0.71 km)	20 yd (18 m)	A tornado struck downtown Des Moines, downing power lines and snapping power poles. A car was also flipped.
EF2	NNE of Woodlawn to N of North Fork	Monroe	MO	39.5911°N 92.2118°W	21:45–22:00	15.14 mi (24.37 km)	100 yd (91 m)	A strong tornado initially damaged trees before striking a residence, removing half of its roof with debris and insulation blown 100 yd (91 m) into a grove of trees. Numerous trees were also damaged at this location. As it traveled to the northeast, it reached peak intensity when it struck a single wide mobile home, completely destroying it. The occupant of the mobile home suffered severe injuries. The tornado then lifted and dissipated.
EF0	W of Ely	Marion	MO	39.6935°N 91.7161°W	22:14–22:16	1.2 mi (1.9 km)	50 yd (46 m)	A tornado touched down in a corn field and snapped nearby trees.
EF1	E of Woodland to southern Palmyra	Marion	MO	39.7517°N 91.5764°W	22:29–22:34	3.79 mi (6.10 km)	100 yd (91 m)	A tornado damaged several trees and large tree limbs were blown down. The tornado traveled to the northeast, damaging a machine shed before moving into the southern part of Palmyra where it damaged a welding company’s building. Three of the four large corrugated steel buildings were severely damaged. One semi trailer was lifted and dropped onto two other trailers. The tornado then damaged a church and structures around the church. Further northeast a trucking company sustained minor building damage. It then crossed U.S. 61, where it picked up a car that was traveling south on the highway and flipped it twice, injuring the driver. Additional tree damage occurred before the tornado dissipated.
EF0	Palmyra	Marion	MO	39.7969°N 91.5352°W	22:30–22:31	0.7 mi (1.1 km)	60 yd (55 m)	A weak tornado traveled east northeast through Palmyra, damaging several trees and power lines. Three large, corrugated buildings were damaged and a store had its roof minorly damaged.
EF1	Seymour	Wayne	IA	40.6785°N 93.1262°W	22:35–22:37	0.95 mi (1.53 km)	20 yd (18 m)	A tornado struck Seymour, blowing a roof off of a building, blowing windows out and downing power lines in town.
EF0	NNW of Hannibal to WSW of Helton	Marion	MO	39.7632°N 91.4761°W	22:35–22:36	0.51 mi (0.82 km)	40 yd (37 m)	A few trees and tree limbs were downed.
EF0	WNW of Lakonta	Mahaska	IA	41.23°N 92.83°W	22:53–22:57	3.2 mi (5.1 km)	25 yd (23 m)	Local media confirmed a tornado occurring over open fields and pastures.
EF0	WSW of Lakonta	Mahaska	IA	41.18°N 92.85°W	22:55–22:56	0.52 mi (0.84 km)	20 yd (18 m)	An anti-cyclonic tornado briefly occurred in an open field.
EF0	SW of Payson	Adams	IL	39.7879°N 91.3211°W	22:55–22:56	0.04 mi (0.064 km)	40 yd (37 m)	A tornado touched down and flattened a corn field.
EF0	W of Buell	Montgomery	MO	39.0333°N 91.5058°W	23:17–23:19	2.12 mi (3.41 km)	40 yd (37 m)	A tornado traveled northeast destroying one outbuilding and damaging or destroying numerous trees. The southeast corner of a hog confinement building was damaged, leading to a partial roof collapse. An unoccupied car was also damaged.
EF1	NE of Delta	Keokuk	IA	41.3484°N 92.3055°W	23:35–23:37	1 mi (1.6 km)	100 yd (91 m)	A cattle barn and machine shed were destroyed. One house sustained moderate structural damage, while another house received minor damage. A 3-ton horse trailer was lofted and then rolled 200 ft (61 m). Numerous trees were snapped off, and there was damage to corn and soybean crops.
EF0	SSE of Hawk Point	Lincoln	MO	38.8989°N 91.099°W	00:18–00:19	0.05 mi (0.080 km)	30 yd (27 m)	Half a dozen trees had their tops snapped off.
EF0	SSE of Notch	Stone	MO	36.63°N 93.34°W	02:05	0.1 mi (0.16 km)	25 yd (23 m)	A boat dock was destroyed.

=== October 8 event ===
List of confirmed tornadoes – Monday, October 8, 2007
EF#	Location	County / Parish	State	Start Coord.	Time (UTC)	Path length	Max width	Summary
EF0	Fifield	Price	WI	45.88°N 90.42°W	15:55	0.1 mi (0.16 km)	10 yd (9.1 m)	Two homes received minor damage and a large tree was blown down.

=== October 16 event ===
List of confirmed tornadoes – Tuesday, October 16, 2007
EF#	Location	County / Parish	State	Start Coord.	Time (UTC)	Path length	Max width	Summary
EF1	W of Ogg to E of Cleta Station	Randall	TX	34.83°N 101.9699°W	05:16–05:35	11.46 mi (18.44 km)	300 yd (270 m)	Substantial damage was noted to barns, power poles, fencing and a trailer. As the tornado moved northeast a large metal container, metal roofing, numerous trees, three transmission line poles, three barns were all heavily damaged. At a homestead, the tornado lifted and displaced a metal vat full of tools and equipment. Two large diesel tanks that sat atop support pedestals behind two of the barns were shifted, one of which was completely full.

=== October 17 event ===
List of confirmed tornadoes – Wednesday, October 17, 2007
EF#	Location	County / Parish	State	Start Coord.	Time (UTC)	Path length	Max width	Summary
EF0	SW of Buna	Jasper	TX	30.41°N 94.01°W	15:32–15:34	1 mi (1.6 km)	20 yd (18 m)	A brief tornado downed a few trees.
EF0	W of Centerview	Johnson	MO	38.75°N 93.86°W	21:05–21:06	0.1 mi (0.16 km)	25 yd (23 m)	A brief tornado caused no damage.
EF0	NE of Fort Towson	Choctaw	OK	34.0507°N 95.233°W	22:14	0.1 mi (0.16 km)	50 yd (46 m)	A brief tornado remained over open country and caused no damage.
EF1	Franklinton	Washington	LA	30.85°N 90.15°W	22:45–22:47	0.2 mi (0.32 km)	25 yd (23 m)	A tornado moved directly through Franklinton, where three businesses sustained major roof damage and had windows blown out.
EF2	N of Verona to SSW of Chesapeake	Lawrence	MO	36.9917°N 93.8°W	22:46–23:04	10.11 mi (16.27 km)	150 yd (140 m)	Nine houses were damaged or destroyed, along with a lumber mill and several barns.
EF1	N of Franklinton	Washington	LA	30.9223°N 90.15°W	22:55–22:57	0.2 mi (0.32 km)	25 yd (23 m)	A tornado moved a car 15 ft (4.6 m), uprooted trees, and caused major roof damage to a mobile home.
EF1	SSW of Feenyville to W of Yorktown	Lincoln	AR	33.9502°N 91.9149°W	23:07–23:14	5.37 mi (8.64 km)	440 yd (400 m)	Six mobile homes were damaged or destroyed and four houses sustained minor damage. Widespread tree and power line damage occurred.
EF1	SSW of Carson	Jefferson Davis	MS	31.46°N 89.83°W	00:30–00:31	0.35 mi (0.56 km)	100 yd (91 m)	A storage building was destroyed while another had its roof torn off. An addition to a house had a portion of the roof blown off, and several trees were downed.
EF1	W of Cave Spring	Greene	MO	37.35°N 93.4882°W	00:35–00:40	2.8 mi (4.5 km)	100 yd (91 m)	Two houses and a barn were damaged.
EF1	ENE of Mammoth Springs to NNW of Glendale	Forrest	MS	31.3762°N 89.3304°W	01:10–01:12	1.59 mi (2.56 km)	200 yd (180 m)	Tornado began at Exit 69 on Interstate 59, where a car was blown off the roadway, injuring the occupant. A garage had its roof blown off and a house sustained minor roof damage. Additionally, two metal buildings had their metal doors torn off.
EF0	Tolarville	Holmes	MS	33.05°N 90.23°W	03:03–03:05	2.37 mi (3.81 km)	25 yd (23 m)	Several trees were downed and limbs were snapped in Tolarville.
EF0	N of Morgan	Laclede	MO	37.5634°N 92.68°W	04:35–04:36	0.1 mi (0.16 km)	35 yd (32 m)	A tornado damaged trees, telephone poles and moved a mobile home off of its foundation.
EF0	SE of Hatton	Callaway	MO	39.0093°N 92.0102°W	04:55–04:56	0.53 mi (0.85 km)	30 yd (27 m)	A horse stable, a double wide mobile home, a large garage, and several trees were damaged.
EF0	NW of Tulip to SSW of Holliday	Monroe	MO	39.3743°N 92.2107°W	04:55–05:00	3.97 mi (6.39 km)	40 yd (37 m)	Two machine sheds were damaged as the tornado tracked across mostly farmland. Corn was flattened in farm fields and trees were damaged as well.
EF2	SE of Granville	Monroe	MO	39.5238°N 92.0532°W	05:05–05:09	4.07 mi (6.55 km)	90 yd (82 m)	2 deaths - A high-end EF2 tornado obliterated a mobile home, barn, and a machine shed. The frame of the mobile home was found 1/3 of a mile away, and the two occupants were thrown hundreds of yards into a field and killed. Pieces of debris from the mobile home, barn, and shed were found up to 4 miles away.
EF0	WSW of North Fork	Monroe	MO	39.5942°N 91.9807°W	05:07–05:09	1.72 mi (2.77 km)	50 yd (46 m)	Trees and a machine shed were damaged.

=== October 18 event ===
List of confirmed tornadoes – Thursday, October 18, 2007
EF#	Location	County / Parish	State	Start Coord.	Time (UTC)	Path length	Max width	Summary
EF1	W of Vancleave	Jackson	MS	30.5333°N 88.7833°W	10:45–10:50	2.3 mi (3.7 km)	90 yd (82 m)	A tornado destroyed one mobile home and heavily damaged at least ten others. The tornado also destroyed several outbuildings, snapped trees, and knocked down power lines.
EF1	Pensacola	Escambia	FL	30.397°N 87.2426°W	15:10–15:25	5.62 mi (9.04 km)	150 yd (140 m)	Large tornado first touched down near the Pensacola Naval Air Station and tracked through parts of downtown Pensacola. Boats near the beginning of the path were flipped, and multiple homes were damaged, some heavily. A church lost part of its roof, bleachers were flipped at a baseball field, and extensive tree and power line damage occurred. 30 cars in a Target parking lot were damaged, with some totaled. An Office Depot sustained roof damage, and the Cordova Mall sustained damage to its skylights, allowing water to leak into the building. 86 buildings were damaged by the tornado and four people were injured.
EF0	Southern Starkville	Oktibbeha	MS	33.4106°N 88.8051°W	17:41–17:43	0.32 mi (0.51 km)	50 yd (46 m)	A brief tornado caused minor damage to a building at the Starkville Country Club. Two trees were also snapped.
EF0	E of Starkville	Oktibbeha	MS	33.4681°N 88.7277°W	18:02–18:03	0.36 mi (0.58 km)	25 yd (23 m)	A tornado snapped a few trees.
EF0	NW of Vernon	Lamar	AL	33.83°N 88.21°W	18:15	0.03 mi (0.048 km)	25 yd (23 m)	A brief tornado touchdown was photographed by local police. The tornado did not cause any damage.
EF1	ENE of Kellis Store to SW of Shuqualak	Kemper, Noxubee	MS	32.9153°N 88.6617°W	19:13–19:21	2.41 mi (3.88 km)	100 yd (91 m)	Damage along the path was limited to pine trees being knocked down.
EF0	NNE of Thorn Hill	Marion	AL	34.2013°N 87.659°W	19:42	0.06 mi (0.097 km)	50 yd (46 m)	A farmhouse was damaged, and tree and power line damage occurred.
EF1	S of Mount Hope	Lawrence	AL	34.3066°N 87.5012°W	20:05–20:10	0.16 mi (0.26 km)	100 yd (91 m)	A tornado moved through the Bankhead National Forest, damaging trees.
EF1	W of Tower to Black Lake	Cheboygan	MI	45.35°N 84.3927°W	21:25–21:43	10.21 mi (16.43 km)	215 yd (197 m)	A highly visible tornado was photographed and caught on video as it crossed Black Lake. A barn was destroyed and trees were downed.
EF2	WNW of Lachine to NW of Long Rapids	Alpena	MI	45.1033°N 83.8096°W	22:25–22:33	4.06 mi (6.53 km)	430 yd (390 m)	Three homes suffered roof and siding damage, and three barns were destroyed or heavily damaged. A garage and a shed were also destroyed, and there was substantial tree damage along the path.
EF1	NE of Owensboro	Daviess	KY	37.8365°N 87.0359°W	23:07–23:10	2 mi (3.2 km)	90 yd (82 m)	A few structures were damaged and numerous trees were downed along the path.
EF0	Louisville	Jefferson	KY	38.2581°N 85.7044°W	23:10–23:11	0.04 mi (0.064 km)	10 yd (9.1 m)	A tornado touched down at a Kroger store in the Crescent Hill neighborhood. Windows were blown out of the grocery store, a shopping cart corral was blown into a car, and a large power pole was blown down.
EF2	ENE of Thurston to WSW of Hawesville	Daviess, Hancock	KY	37.8111°N 86.9962°W	23:10–23:32	13.93 mi (22.42 km)	200 yd (180 m)	Major tree and structural damage occurred. A mobile home was destroyed and several barns were leveled before the tornado dissipated.
EF0	SW of Gatewood	Daviess	KY	37.8044°N 86.9024°W	23:15–23:16	0.2 mi (0.32 km)	20 yd (18 m)	Several trees were damaged by this brief tornado.
EF1	ESE of Cannelton to SSW of Gerald	Perry	IN	37.9147°N 86.7302°W	23:34–23:45	8.15 mi (13.12 km)	200 yd (180 m)	A tornado caused relatively minor damage along its path.
EF2	Crofton to WSW of Kalkaska	Kalkaska	MI	44.6671°N 85.23°W	23:35–23:42	4.45 mi (7.16 km)	430 yd (390 m)	1 death - Multiple homes were damaged along the path, some severely. A large metal warehouse building was damaged, and a nearby mobile home was destroyed, resulting in a fatality. Several hangars and small planes were damaged at the Kalkaska County Airport, and sheet metal from the hangars was deposited near the Kalkaska Middle School. Large trees were also uprooted and one other person was injured.
EF2	NE of Dixon to SE of Sebree	Webster	KY	37.5302°N 87.6871°W	00:09–00:25	10.19 mi (16.40 km)	300 yd (270 m)	Three homes were destroyed and 10 others were damaged. A youth rehabilitation center sustained major damage. One mobile home was obliterated and scattered across a field, injuring all four occupants. The metal frame of the mobile home was thrown 300 ft (91 m). Another injury occurred as a vehicle was picked up and thrown by the tornado, ejecting the occupant.
EF2	NW of Luzerne to N of Mio	Oscoda	MI	44.6405°N 84.2988°W	00:12–00:26	11.63 mi (18.72 km)	865 yd (791 m)	A large wedge tornado moved through densely forested areas. Tens of thousands of trees were snapped or uprooted, and many power lines were downed. About 16 structures were damaged, mostly outbuildings or cabins. Three of the cabins were completely destroyed.
EF0	NE of West Salem	Edwards	IL	38.5405°N 87.9938°W	00:15–00:16	0.1 mi (0.16 km)	20 yd (18 m)	A brief tornado remained over open country and caused no damage.
EF1	E of Creswell to NNE of Fryer	Caldwell, Hopkins	KY	37.27°N 87.9018°W	00:16–00:23	5.2 mi (8.4 km)	100 yd (91 m)	Trees were uprooted and snapped.
EF1	W of Otter Pond to ENE of Friendship	Caldwell, Christian	KY	37.03°N 87.8417°W	00:25–00:37	8.83 mi (14.21 km)	300 yd (270 m)	Seven homes sustained major damage, some of which had roofs torn off. Many trees were snapped and uprooted, and several small barns were destroyed.
EF2	W of Beech Grove to SW of Owensboro	McLean, Daviess	KY	37.62°N 87.4767°W	00:32–01:05	17.26 mi (27.78 km)	360 yd (330 m)	Near Beech Grove, numerous barns and outbuildings were destroyed, a house sustained major damage, and four other homes sustained minor damage. A pontoon boat was moved up to 20 ft (6.1 m) from where it originated, and a garage and several vehicles were destroyed. Near Owensboro, additional homes and outbuildings sustained major damage, with a few destroyed. Extensive tree and power line damage occurred along the path, and four people were injured when a mobile home was completely destroyed.
EF0	N of Ambia	Benton	IN	40.4945°N 87.52°W	00:35–00:36	0.4 mi (0.64 km)	20 yd (18 m)	A brief tornado touched down in an open field caused no damage.
EF2	NW of Macedonia	Caldwell	KY	37.1168°N 87.7161°W	00:40–00:42	1.4 mi (2.3 km)	300 yd (270 m)	A tornado flattened a swath of large trees in the Pennyrile State Forest. Three mobile homes were damaged, including one that was blown down a hill and smashed, injuring the occupant. A barn was destroyed as well.
EF1	ESE of Comins to NNW of Curran	Oscoda, Alcona	MI	44.7756°N 83.9028°W	00:42–00:44	3.22 mi (5.18 km)	150 yd (140 m)	Considerable tree damage occurred, outbuildings were damaged, and swirl marks were left in farm fields.
EF2	SW of St. Charles	Christian, Hopkins	KY	37.136°N 87.6252°W	00:48–00:51	1.86 mi (2.99 km)	300 yd (270 m)	Numerous trees were downed and three mobile homes were destroyed, one of which had its metal frame bent. Debris from the mobile homes was scattered hundreds of yards away. Barns were damaged, and a frame home sustained major roof, siding, and porch damage. One person was injured.
EF1	N of Canton	Trigg	KY	36.8361°N 87.95°W	00:56–01:00	3 mi (4.8 km)	75 yd (69 m)	Many large trees and tree limbs were downed, including some that damaged a dock, a garage, and a house. Further along the path, another garage had tin roofing peeled back, and a house had part of its roof blown off. Two cabins at Lake Barkley State Resort Park sustained roof damage. The state park was closed for most of the following day, mostly due to trees and power lines blocking access to the park.
EF1	N of Nortonville	Hopkins	KY	37.2°N 87.4791°W	00:58–01:00	2 mi (3.2 km)	100 yd (91 m)	A tornado caused damage to several buildings in the Nortonville area. Two masonry buildings had their wooden roofs blown off, a gas station canopy was damaged, and a tree fell onto a house. Trees were sheared off and uprooted.
EF2	NNW of Hubbard Lake	Alpena	MI	44.9383°N 83.6155°W	01:00–01:01	0.25 mi (0.40 km)	230 yd (210 m)	A house had much of its second story ripped off, and two barns and a mobile home were destroyed. Cows and chickens in the area were killed, and extensive tree damage occurred as well.
EF1	ESE of Murray to N of Hamlin	Trigg	KY	36.5757°N 88.1869°W	01:07–01:17	7.23 mi (11.64 km)	180 yd (160 m)	Hundreds of trees were snapped and uprooted. One home received major roof damage, primarily from falling trees.
EF3	Western Owensboro, KY	Daviess (KY), Spencer (IN)	KY, IN	37.77°N 87.1657°W	01:09–01:20	6.99 mi (11.25 km)	360 yd (330 m)	An intense tornado struck Owensboro for the second time since 2000. 150 homes were damaged in Owensboro, with several destroyed. Two historic churches sustained major damage, including one that had its steeple collapse through the roof into the sanctuary. A motel sustained major damage and had most of its roof torn off. Almost every building at Brescia University sustained damage, mostly to the roofs and windows. A delivery truck was overturned, and streets were littered with debris from collapsed roofs and warehouses. Several large brick tobacco warehouses were completely destroyed. Extensive tree and power line damage occurred as well. 8 people were injured.
EF1	W of Model	Stewart	TN	36.65°N 88.0401°W	01:18–01:19	0.67 mi (1.08 km)	500 yd (460 m)	Numerous trees were snapped and uprooted.
EF0	SW of Linton	Trigg	KY	36.6544°N 87.9319°W	01:23–01:24	1 mi (1.6 km)	50 yd (46 m)	Trees were uprooted in the Land Between the Lakes area.
EF1	SSE of Saint Marks to Kyana	Dubois	IN	38.2725°N 86.8058°W	01:27–01:30	1.94 mi (3.12 km)	125 yd (114 m)	About 100 trees were snapped or uprooted, a barn was damaged, and a door was ripped off of a house.
EF2	NE of Linton to SE of Cadiz	Trigg	KY	36.7168°N 87.8541°W	01:32–01:45	9.28 mi (14.93 km)	200 yd (180 m)	Two barns and a large garage were destroyed, with debris scattered up to 0.75 mi (1.21 km) away and projectiles embedded into the ground. Four power poles were snapped. Numerous trees were snapped and uprooted, some of which had metal debris stuck in them.
EF3	SSW of Vesta to E of Solon	Jefferson	IN	38.4716°N 85.5539°W	02:03–02:09	4.8 mi (7.7 km)	440 yd (400 m)	10 homes were damaged by this tornado, four heavily, one of which was swept away with only its basement left. The home that was swept away was bolted to its foundation, though it was determined that the severity of the destruction at that residence was the result of two nearby barns, a stable, and a silo being blown away and slammed into the house, as context was not indicative of a violent tornado. Four vehicles were heavily damaged or destroyed, and corn and soybean fields were scoured by the tornado.
EF3	SE of Inwood to Nappanee to W of New Paris	Marshall, Kosciusko, Elkhart	IN	41.2973°N 86.1698°W	02:05–02:29	20.33 mi (32.72 km)	880 yd (800 m)	An intense tornado tore through Nappanee. As the tornado touched down, numerous trees were sheared off and uprooted, grain silos were damaged, and power poles were broken in that area. Homes sustained up to high-end EF1 damage, mobile homes were flipped, a garage was reduced to a bare slab, and a trampoline and a highway sign were mangled. Down the path, the tornado strengthened and some areas of EF2 damage were noted. Several Amish homes and barns sustained major damage in this area, and one frail home lost its roof and exterior walls. The tornado then entered Nappanee as a high-end EF2, partially destroying a church and tearing the roofs and second stories from several homes. Many new RVs and mobile homes were destroyed at a distribution plant, and a nearby factory was damaged. The tornado reached high-end EF3 strength in the eastern part of town, where another RV plant was flattened, a metal-frame warehouse building was heavily damaged, and a gas station was destroyed. A Taco Bell and a Dairy Queen sustained major damage in this area, along with several homes in a nearby subdivision, one of which only had interior walls left. The tornado then exited town and caused EF1 to EF2 damage to several homes and farms before dissipating. A total of 591 buildings (including at least 368 homes and 81 businesses) were damaged, of which at least 98 were destroyed across the three counties. A few minor injuries occurred.
EF2	Rosetta	Breckinridge	KY	37.7862°N 86.2875°W	02:26–02:33	3.95 mi (6.36 km)	300 yd (270 m)	A church was destroyed and a nearby house had much of its roof torn off. Two large outbuildings were destroyed and a trailer was wrapped around a tree. A pickup truck was thrown 75 ft (23 m) and a 4,500 lb (2,000 kg) tractor was shifted 7 ft (2.1 m) from where it sat. Numerous trees along the path were snapped and uprooted.
EF2	W of Vantown to southern Williamston to SSE of Perry	Ingham, Shiawassee	MI	42.61°N 84.3°W	02:28–02:56	19 mi (31 km)	300 yd (270 m)	2 deaths - A tornado struck the south side of Williamston, where approximately 100 homes were damaged. Just outside town, two people were killed when a modular home was thrown into a pond. Near Perry, four barns and three houses received damage. One house had windows blown out, a farmhouse had a section of roof taken off, and a modular home had its entire roof ripped off. One other person was injured.
EF1	NNW of Flaherty to SW of Muldraugh	Meade	KY	37.8434°N 86.077°W	02:50–02:55	4.11 mi (6.61 km)	300 yd (270 m)	An inn sustained roof damage, and a service station canopy was knocked over. The tornado also uprooted large trees along the damage path.
EF1	Hubers	Bullitt	KY	38.0305°N 85.6938°W	03:20–03:26	1.64 mi (2.64 km)	200 yd (180 m)	Two outbuildings were damaged and numerous trees were downed at the beginning of the path. A garage was destroyed and several homes sustained minor damage further along the path.

=== October 19 event ===
List of confirmed tornadoes –Friday, October 19, 2007
EF#	Location	County / Parish	State	Start Coord.	Time (UTC)	Path length	Max width	Summary
EF0	Thetford Center	Genesee	MI	43.18°N 83.62°W	05:06–05:09	2.5 mi (4.0 km)	50 yd (46 m)	Trees were snapped and uprooted, a home sustained shingle damage, and a barn lost part of its metal roof.
EF1	Millington	Tuscola	MI	43.2647°N 83.5511°W	05:16–05:18	2 mi (3.2 km)	30 yd (27 m)	25 ft (7.6 m) and buried under about 4 ft (1.2 m) of beams, rafters, and other debris. A home near the modular home was damaged by flying debris, and a third home lost part of its roof.
EF0	Bradfordsville	Marion	KY	37.4915°N 85.1601°W	05:36–05:38	0.77 mi (1.24 km)	20 yd (18 m)	One mobile home was rolled over and several houses lost shingles. Extensive tree and power pole damage occurred in town, and outbuildings were destroyed.
EF1	W of Deford	Tuscola	MI	43.52°N 83.2419°W	05:45–05:48	3 mi (4.8 km)	100 yd (91 m)	Trees were snapped and uprooted, a home sustained shingle damage, and a barn lost part of its metal roof.
EF1	W of Port Hope	Huron	MI	43.93°N 82.80003°W	06:26–06:27	1 mi (1.6 km)	100 yd (91 m)	Farm machinery was lifted and displaced, and a farm shed was moved about 120 ft (37 m) off of its foundation. Also, the walls of a large barn were lifted 6 ft (1.8 m) to 8 ft (2.4 m) from the foundation.

=== October 22 event ===
List of confirmed tornadoes – Monday, October 22, 2007
EF#	Location	County / Parish	State	Start Coord.	Time (UTC)	Path length	Max width	Summary
EF0	Dauphin Island	Mobile	AL	30.25°N 88.12°W	20:07–20:08	0.1 mi (0.16 km)	50 yd (46 m)	A waterspout moved ashore and quickly dissipated on a beach.
EF1	NE of Bayou la Batre	Mobile	AL	30.433°N 88.2122°W	21:33–21:36	0.7 mi (1.1 km)	200 yd (180 m)	A manufactured home was broadsided and was overturned and demolished. Another manufactured home was pushed several feet by the winds but stayed anchored into the ground. Several other homes and sheds were damaged in the area. Trees and power lines were also blown down.
EF1	NE of Mackman to Moorhead	Sunflower	MS	33.42°N 90.54°W	22:54–22:59	3.47 mi (5.58 km)	150 yd (140 m)	A tornado touched down in a farm field and leveled crops before reaching Moorehead. As the tornado moved into the southwest portion of town, a number of trees were snapped, a barn had a portion of the roof blown off and a few outbuildings were damaged. Additionally, a metal gazebo was thrown onto a house and a metal walkway was destroyed at a school.
EF1	S of Sledge to ENE of Rosemary	Hale	AL	32.5232°N 87.5708°W	03:44–04:01	9.31 mi (14.98 km)	50 yd (46 m)	At least 20 homes sustained damage, with 11 of the homes severely damaged. One airplane hangar suffered major damage. Numerous trees were either uprooted or snapped off along the path. Two people were injured.
EF1	SW of Harrisburg to SSW of Ingate	Bibb	AL	32.8386°N 87.2675°W	05:01–05:06	7.71 mi (12.41 km)	200 yd (180 m)	At least 3 homes suffered minor damage and several outbuildings were destroyed. Numerous soft and hardwood trees were snapped.

=== October 23 event ===
List of confirmed tornadoes – Tuesday, October 23, 2007
EF#	Location	County / Parish	State	Start Coord.	Time (UTC)	Path length	Max width	Summary
EF1	ESE of Lowndesboro to SSW of Manack	Lowndes	AL	32.2493°N 86.5412°W	06:40–06:45	3.25 mi (5.23 km)	100 yd (91 m)	A wing of an auxiliary church had its entire roof blown off, a couple windows blown out, and the steeple was blown 100 yd (91 m) over a house. The main church building sustained damage to about a fifth of its roof. Multiple trees were also blown down in the church area.
EF0	NW of Georgiana	Butler	AL	31.6505°N 86.774°W	18:50–18:52	0.1 mi (0.16 km)	60 yd (55 m)	A weak tornado blew down several trees and power lines.

== November ==
Confirmed tornadoes by Enhanced Fujita rating
EFU	EF0	EF1	EF2	EF3	EF4	EF5	Total
0	4	2	1	0	0	0	7

=== November 5 event ===
List of confirmed tornadoes – Monday, November 5, 2007
EF#	Location	County / Parish	State	Start Coord.	Time (UTC)	Path length	Max width	Summary
EF0	WNW of Kendall Springs	Bath	KY	38.1152°N 83.8267°W	22:12–22:14	1.52 mi (2.45 km)	30 yd (27 m)	Four older barns had significant roof and wall damage. One of the barns was pushed off its foundation. Numerous trees were downed and snapped along the path. The tornado crossed I-64 before lifting.

=== November 14 event ===
List of confirmed tornadoes – Wednesday, November 14, 2007
EF#	Location	County / Parish	State	Start Coord.	Time (UTC)	Path length	Max width	Summary
EF1	SE of Union Hill	Jackson, Putnam	TN	36.2164°N 85.6132°W	21:17–21:18	0.12 mi (0.19 km)	100 yd (91 m)	A brief tornado uprooted a few trees, snapped one tree and tore the front porch off a home.
EF0	ENE of Bernstadt to SW of Pittsburg	Laurel	KY	37.158°N 84.169°W	21:28–21:33	1.99 mi (3.20 km)	200 yd (180 m)	Several homes along the path sustained broken windows, shingle and gutter damage. A barn collapsed and several outbuildings were also damaged, with one building being blown off its foundation. A manufactured home was also shifted off its foundation. Intermittent tree damage was observed along the path.
EF0	WSW of Bakers Crossroads	White	TN	36.015°N 85.5702°W	22:16–22:17	0.67 mi (1.08 km)	100 yd (91 m)	A mobile was blown off its foundation and rolled across the street, slamming into a brick home.
EF1	NNW of Vanntown to NE of Milners Switch	Lincoln	TN	35.0413°N 86.4761°W	23:35–23:40	5.34 mi (8.59 km)	75 yd (69 m)	A storage shed was destroyed and a pole barn suffered considerable damage. A large oak tree was uprooted along with other trees blown down.
EF2	Kimball	Marion	TN	35.0502°N 85.6855°W	01:02–01:09	1.96 mi (3.15 km)	200 yd (180 m)	The roof of a church was heavily damaged along with several vehicles in the church parking lot. The tornado also destroyed several modular homes. Nine people were injured.

=== November 19 event ===
List of confirmed tornadoes – Monday, November 19, 2007
EF#	Location	County / Parish	State	Start Coord.	Time (UTC)	Path length	Max width	Summary
EF0	SSE of Lyford	Willacy	TX	26.391°N 97.7666°W	23:15–23:30	1 mi (1.6 km)	10 yd (9.1 m)	A resident noticed a tornado over an open field.

== December ==
Confirmed tornadoes by Enhanced Fujita rating
EFU	EF0	EF1	EF2	EF3	EF4	EF5	Total
0	10	6	3	0	0	0	19

=== December 2 event ===
List of confirmed tornadoes – Sunday, December 2, 2007
EF#	Location	County / Parish	State	Start Coord.	Time (UTC)	Path length	Max width	Summary
EF0	NW of Willholt	Ozark	MO	36.6902°N 92.5128°W	18:38–18:39	0.4 mi (0.64 km)	50 yd (46 m)	A brief tornado damaged numerous trees.

=== December 15 event ===
List of confirmed tornadoes –Saturday, December 15, 2007
EF#	Location	County / Parish	State	Start Coord.	Time (UTC)	Path length	Max width	Summary
EF0	Warren	Tyler	TX	30.6101°N 94.411°W	13:39–13:40	0.25 mi (0.40 km)	50 yd (46 m)	A brief tornado uprooted pine trees, damaged sheet metal roofing and blew a fence down.
EF0	W of Blakely	Early	GA	31.38°N 85.0348°W	22:55–23:00	3.83 mi (6.16 km)	75 yd (69 m)	A tornado destroyed an old shed store and an outbuilding and damaged a mobile home.
EF0	WNW of Sylvester to Isabella	Worth	GA	31.5522°N 83.9128°W	02:03–02:06	3.9 mi (6.3 km)	75 yd (69 m)	A tornado destroyed a peanut warehouse and damaged 29 homes.
EF1	Ashburn	Turner	GA	31.6898°N 83.682°W	02:20–02:22	3.5 mi (5.6 km)	125 yd (114 m)	1 death - A tornado destroyed 4 mobile homes and damaged 39 homes. A semi-truck traveling on I-75 was blown off the road and the driver was killed.
EF1	W of Owensboro	Wilcox	GA	31.87°N 83.4641°W	02:30–02:31	0.5 mi (0.80 km)	100 yd (91 m)	A brief tornado tore the roof off an old dairy shed and destroyed a cinder block
EF0	ENE of Jay Bird Springs	Dodge	GA	32.1577°N 82.921°W	03:18–03:19	0.5 mi (0.80 km)	25 yd (23 m)	One mobile home was damaged and numerous trees and power lines were knocked down.
EF2	Lothair	Treutlen	GA	32.3398°N 82.6621°W	03:41–03:47	3.5 mi (5.6 km)	200 yd (180 m)	A strong tornado touched down in a heavily forested area. Significant tree damage was noted within the forested area as a result of the tornado. The tornado then strengthened as it moved northeast and reached the town of Lothair where a fire department building was destroyed. A mobile home northeast of Lothair, was completely destroyed by the tornado and another home was moved off its foundation. Right before the tornado lifted, it ripped a carport off a home and threw it approximately 50 yd (46 m) across the street.

=== December 16 event ===
List of confirmed tornadoes –Sunday, December 16, 2007
EF#	Location	County / Parish	State	Start Coord.	Time (UTC)	Path length	Max width	Summary
EF1	SSE of Hague	Alachua	FL	29.73°N 82.41°W	07:45–07:47	0.75 mi (1.21 km)	200 yd (180 m)	A brief tornado downed numerous pine trees and a few were uprooted. A portion of a masonry brick wall on a small farm outbuilding was knocked over and the metal roof was ripped off and strewn across a field. A farm truck was flipped on its side near the outbuilding. Another house had a damaged carport, minor wall damage, a toppled TV antenna mast and many of the roof shingles were stripped.
EF1	NNW of Land o' Lakes	Pasco	FL	28.3129°N 82.509°W	10:20–10:27	3.2 mi (5.1 km)	100 yd (91 m)	A housing annex at the county jail was destroyed. There was also roof damage to a fire station, four vehicles were flipped and there were numerous trees and power poles downed.

=== December 20 event ===
List of confirmed tornadoes – Thursday, December 20, 2007
EF#	Location	County / Parish	State	Start Coord.	Time (UTC)	Path length	Max width	Summary
EF0	WSW of Martinsville	Copiah	MS	31.7746°N 90.4487°W	14:59–15:03	2.24 mi (3.60 km)	50 yd (46 m)	A weak tornado crossed I-55, snapping several trees around the interstate.
EF2	ENE of Brookhaven to W of Woolworth	Lincoln	MS	31.6114°N 90.3718°W	15:00–15:10	5.03 mi (8.10 km)	200 yd (180 m)	Two mobile homes were obliterated with their debris being swept and thrown 100 yd (91 m). Numerous trees were snapped and uprooted, along with several power lines downed. A shop was also destroyed, a camper trailer was heavily damaged and two other homes suffered significant roof damage.
EF1	Southern Collins to S of Hot Coffee	Covington	MS	31.6263°N 89.5525°W	16:10–16:19	7.16 mi (11.52 km)	500 yd (460 m)	A billboard was blown over and a warehouse building was destroyed. Numerous trees were uprooted and snapped. The roof of a chicken coop was completely torn off and caused some roof damage to two homes.
EF1	S of Hot Coffee	Covington	MS	31.65°N 89.45°W	16:18–16:19	0.44 mi (0.71 km)	100 yd (91 m)	The roofs of two mobile homes were blown off. Another home had part of its roof removed along with numerous pine trees snapped and uprooted around the property.
EF2	SW of Service	Jones	MS	31.6879°N 89.2756°W	16:32–16:36	1.91 mi (3.07 km)	150 yd (140 m)	A significant but brief tornado blew a brick home's roof structure off and blew a few walls down. Three mobile homes were rolled or tossed and destroyed. Numerous trees were snapped or uprooted. Before the tornado lifted, one final home suffered significant roof damage and a car and outbuilding were inflicted major damage.

=== December 21 event ===
List of confirmed tornadoes – Friday, December 21, 2007
EF#	Location	County / Parish	State	Start Coord.	Time (UTC)	Path length	Max width	Summary
EF0	North Naples	Collier	FL	26.2388°N 81.8208°W	13:10–13:11	0.44 mi (0.71 km)	20 yd (18 m)	A waterspout moved onshore damaging a restaurant.

=== December 26 event ===
List of confirmed tornadoes – Wednesday, December 26, 2007
EF#	Location	County / Parish	State	Start Coord.	Time (UTC)	Path length	Max width	Summary
EF0	Crozier	Terrebonne	LA	29.53°N 90.75°W	21:12–21:17	0.2 mi (0.32 km)	25 yd (23 m)	A weak tornado damaged five houses, two mobile homes and a shed.

=== December 27 event ===
List of confirmed tornadoes – Thursday, December 27, 2007
EF#	Location	County / Parish	State	Start Coord.	Time (UTC)	Path length	Max width	Summary
EF0	N of Lubbock	Lubbock	TX	33.6518°N 101.8934°W	23:18–23:23	1.64 mi (2.64 km)	75 yd (69 m)	A tornado was photographed by the public as it traveled through open country.
EF0	ESE of Slaton	Lubbock	TX	33.416°N 101.6167°W	23:30–23:34	0.79 mi (1.27 km)	50 yd (46 m)	Local media relayed a video of a well-developed tornado over open fields. No damage was reported.

== See also ==
- Tornadoes of 2007
- List of United States tornadoes from August to September 2007
- List of United States tornadoes from January to February 2008
