= Hot Coffee =

Hot Coffee may refer to:

- Coffee, a beverage that is typically served hot
- Hot Coffee, Mississippi, a non census-designated community in Covington County, Mississippi
- Hot Coffee (minigame), a normally inaccessible minigame in the 2004 video game Grand Theft Auto: San Andreas
- Liebeck v. McDonald's Restaurants, a 1994 product liability lawsuit involving spilt hot coffee
  - Hot Coffee (film), a 2011 documentary about the 1994 product liability lawsuit
