= List of United States tornadoes from August to September 2007 =

This page documents all the tornadoes that touched down in the United States in August to September 2007. Tornadoes in the month of January are given with their Fujita Scale intensity while all tornadoes from February and on are given with their Enhanced Fujita Scale intensity. This is because the scale was changed on February 1 due to the National Weather Service implementing a more accurate way to classify tornadoes.

== United States Yearly Total ==
Confirmed tornadoes by Enhanced Fujita rating
EFU	EF0	EF1	EF2	EF3	EF4	EF5	Total
0	675	298	91	27	4	1	1,096

- Note: January tornadoes were rated using the old Fujita scale, but are included in the chart above by matching the F rating to the related EF scale rating.

== August ==
Confirmed tornadoes by Enhanced Fujita rating
EFU	EF0	EF1	EF2	EF3	EF4	EF5	Total
0	45	22	3	2	1	0	73

=== August 2 event ===
List of confirmed tornadoes – Thursday, August 2, 2007 (Note: All dates are based on the local time zone where the tornado touched down; however, all times are in Coordinated Universal Time for consistency.)
EF#	Location	County / Parish	State	Start Coord.	Time (UTC)	Path length	Max width	Summary
EF0	WNW of New Home	Lynn	TX	33.3684°N 102.0599°W	18:51–18:55	0.25 mi (0.40 km)	75 yd (69 m)	

=== August 3 event ===
List of confirmed tornadoes – Friday, August 3, 2007
EF#	Location	County / Parish	State	Start Coord.	Time (UTC)	Path length	Max width	Summary
EF0	SSE of St. Francis	Todd	SD	42.9898°N 100.8405°W	22:30	0.01 mi (0.016 km)	10 yd (9.1 m)	
EF0	N of Sparks	Cherry	NE	42.9789°N 100.27°W	00:02	0.1 mi (0.16 km)	10 yd (9.1 m)	
EF0	N of Bartlett	Wheeler	NE	41.9667°N 98.55°W	01:30	0.1 mi (0.16 km)	10 yd (9.1 m)	

=== August 5 event ===
List of confirmed tornadoes – Sunday, August 5, 2007
EF#	Location	County / Parish	State	Start Coord.	Time (UTC)	Path length	Max width	Summary
EF0	Bolingbrook	Will	IL	41.67°N 88.13°W	23:13–23:14	0.35 mi (0.56 km)	50 yd (46 m)	
EF0	SW of Bettsville	Seneca	OH	41.2193°N 83.2708°W	23:50–23:53	0.75 mi (1.21 km)	10 yd (9.1 m)	
EF0	S of Carey	Wyandot	OH	40.9355°N 83.37°W	00:42–00:46	0.75 mi (1.21 km)	10 yd (9.1 m)	

=== August 6 event ===
List of confirmed tornadoes – Monday, August 6, 2007
EF#	Location	County / Parish	State	Start Coord.	Time (UTC)	Path length	Max width	Summary

=== August 7 event ===
List of confirmed tornadoes – Tuesday, August 7, 2007
EF#	Location	County / Parish	State	Start Coord.	Time (UTC)	Path length	Max width	Summary
EF1	NE of Woodward	Centre	PA	40.9205°N 77.323°W	02:25–02:30	1.5 mi (2.4 km)	400 yd (370 m)	

=== August 8 event ===
List of confirmed tornadoes – Wednesday, August 8, 2007
EF#	Location	County / Parish	State	Start Coord.	Time (UTC)	Path length	Max width	Summary
EF1	Staten Island	Richmond	NY	40.627°N 74.1078°W	10:22–10:33	1.95 mi (3.14 km)	50 yd (46 m)	
EF2	Brooklyn	Kings	NY	40.6155°N 74.0267°W	10:32–10:40	3.92 mi (6.31 km)	100 yd (91 m)	See article on this tornado – This is the strongest tornado on record to occur in New York City.
EF0	NW of Eureka	McPherson	SD	45.78°N 99.64°W	20:59–21:03	0.2 mi (0.32 km)	10 yd (9.1 m)	
EF0	S of Durham	Lewis	MO	39.9555°N 91.67°W	22:02	0.1 mi (0.16 km)	10 yd (9.1 m)	
EF0	NNW of Fairfax	Atchison	MO	40.3498°N 95.4107°W	23:45–23:46	0.1 mi (0.16 km)	25 yd (23 m)	

=== August 9 event ===
List of confirmed tornadoes – Thursday, August 9, 2007
EF#	Location	County / Parish	State	Start Coord.	Time (UTC)	Path length	Max width	Summary
EF0	Pittsburgh	Allegheny	PA	40.43°N 79.9931°W	18:50–18:51	0.49 mi (0.79 km)	200 yd (180 m)	
EF0	Shelby	Richland	OH	40.88°N 82.65°W	20:06–20:08	0.75 mi (1.21 km)	20 yd (18 m)	
EF1	NE of Sullivan	Ashland	OH	41.0556°N 82.1961°W	20:28–20:32	0.5 mi (0.80 km)	30 yd (27 m)	
EF1	NNW of Lodi	Medina	OH	41.0567°N 82.0347°W	20:35–20:40	1 mi (1.6 km)	50 yd (46 m)	

=== August 10 event ===
List of confirmed tornadoes – Friday, August 10, 2007
EF#	Location	County / Parish	State	Start Coord.	Time (UTC)	Path length	Max width	Summary
EF0	NNE of Tokio to SW of Crary	Benson, Ramsey	ND	47.9734°N 98.767°W	19:18–19:21	1.5 mi (2.4 km)	25 yd (23 m)	
EF1	ENE of Tolna	Nelson	ND	47.8355°N 98.4101°W	19:30–19:40	4.09 mi (6.58 km)	50 yd (46 m)	
EF0	NW of Trail City	Corson	SD	45.54°N 100.81°W	00:06–00:09	0.3 mi (0.48 km)	20 yd (18 m)	
EF0	NNW of Trail City	Corson	SD	45.54°N 100.77°W	00:10–00:13	0.2 mi (0.32 km)	10 yd (9.1 m)	
EF1	SE of Malta	Phillips	MT	48.2069°N 107.655°W	00:15–00:21	0.1 mi (0.16 km)	10 yd (9.1 m)	
EF1	SSW of Opheim	Valley	MT	48.7832°N 106.442°W	01:45–01:53	0.25 mi (0.40 km)	10 yd (9.1 m)	
EF0	SE of Lowry	Walworth	SD	45.26°N 99.85°W	02:25–02:27	0.1 mi (0.16 km)	10 yd (9.1 m)	
EF0	SSE of Alamo	Williams	ND	48.4798°N 103.4073°W	04:04–04:15	1 mi (1.6 km)	40 yd (37 m)	

=== August 11 event ===
List of confirmed tornadoes – Saturday, August 11, 2007
EF#	Location	County / Parish	State	Start Coord.	Time (UTC)	Path length	Max width	Summary
EF0	NE of Port Charlotte	Charlotte	FL	27.0109°N 82.0541°W	21:40–21:42	0.3 mi (0.48 km)	50 yd (46 m)	

=== August 13 event ===
List of confirmed tornadoes – Monday, August 13, 2007
EF#	Location	County / Parish	State	Start Coord.	Time (UTC)	Path length	Max width	Summary
EF0	WSW of Lankin to E of Whitman	Walsh, Nelson	ND	48.237°N 98.221°W	19:38–19:48	6 mi (9.7 km)	100 yd (91 m)	

=== August 15 event ===
List of confirmed tornadoes – Wednesday, August 15, 2007
EF#	Location	County / Parish	State	Start Coord.	Time (UTC)	Path length	Max width	Summary
EF0	SE of Kiowa	Elbert	CO	39.3084°N 104.4139°W	21:15–21:25	0.1 mi (0.16 km)	440 yd (400 m)	
EF1	Argos	Marshall	IN	41.2446°N 86.2969°W	03:15–03:21	2.94 mi (4.73 km)	50 yd (46 m)	

=== August 16 event ===
Texas event is associated with Tropical Storm Erin

List of confirmed tornadoes – Thursday, August 16, 2007
EF#	Location	County / Parish	State	Start Coord.	Time (UTC)	Path length	Max width	Summary
EF0	S of Carrollton	Carroll	MO	39.3411°N 93.5°W	20:05–20:06	0.1 mi (0.16 km)	25 yd (23 m)	
EF1	N of Boerne	Kendall	TX	29.9101°N 98.73°W	22:53–22:57	0.5 mi (0.80 km)	50 yd (46 m)	

=== August 17 event ===
List of confirmed tornadoes – Friday, August 17, 2007
EF#	Location	County / Parish	State	Start Coord.	Time (UTC)	Path length	Max width	Summary
EF0	NE of Inkom	Bannock	ID	42.8307°N 112.2082°W	22:22–22:27	0.2 mi (0.32 km)	50 yd (46 m)	

=== August 18 event ===
Texas & Oklahoma events are associated with Tropical Storm Erin

List of confirmed tornadoes – Saturday, August 18, 2007
EF#	Location	County / Parish	State	Start Coord.	Time (UTC)	Path length	Max width	Summary
EF0	NW of Idaho Springs	Clear Creek	CO	39.8011°N 105.5865°W	20:10–20:15	0.1 mi (0.16 km)	50 yd (46 m)	
EF1	E of Hobart	Kiowa	OK	34.9896°N 99.0103°W	21:46–21:57	6 mi (9.7 km)	50 yd (46 m)	
EF0	SSE of Cordell	Washita	OK	35.1664°N 98.9123°W	22:10–22:20	4 mi (6.4 km)	30 yd (27 m)	
EF1	NNE of Thornberry	Clay	TX	34.0834°N 98.3733°W	00:53–00:57	1 mi (1.6 km)	100 yd (91 m)	
EF1	SSW of Norge to E of Laverty	Grady	OK	34.9536°N 98.0134°W	01:44–01:48	2 mi (3.2 km)	30 yd (27 m)	

=== August 19 event ===
Event is associated with Tropical Storm Erin

List of confirmed tornadoes – Sunday, August 19, 2007
EF#	Location	County / Parish	State	Start Coord.	Time (UTC)	Path length	Max width	Summary
EF0	ENE of Cogar to W of Union City	Caddo, Canadian	OK	35.3394°N 98.1022°W	07:00–07:06	3 mi (4.8 km)	30 yd (27 m)	
EF1	Eastern Minco to N of Union City	Grady, Canadian	OK	35.3145°N 97.9136°W	07:32–07:41	7 mi (11 km)	75 yd (69 m)	

=== August 20 event ===
List of confirmed tornadoes – Monday, August 20, 2007
EF#	Location	County / Parish	State	Start Coord.	Time (UTC)	Path length	Max width	Summary
EF1	NNE of Shauck to SE of Kings Corner	Morrow, Richland	OH	41.6601°N 82.6481°W	18:55–19:07	4.92 mi (7.92 km)	50 yd (46 m)	
EF0	E of Roby	Texas	MO	37.52°N 92.0953°W	19:45–19:46	0.1 mi (0.16 km)	50 yd (46 m)	
EF0	S of Richland	Butler, Colfax	NE	41.3794°N 97.22°W	23:35–23:41	5.32 mi (8.56 km)	100 yd (91 m)	

=== August 22 event ===
List of confirmed tornadoes – Wednesday, August 22, 2007
EF#	Location	County / Parish	State	Start Coord.	Time (UTC)	Path length	Max width	Summary
EF0	Eastern Hastings	Adams	NE	41.3794°N 97.22°W	22:10–22:15	1.5 mi (2.4 km)	25 yd (23 m)	

=== August 23 event ===
List of confirmed tornadoes – Thursday, August 23, 2007
EF#	Location	County / Parish	State	Start Coord.	Time (UTC)	Path length	Max width	Summary
EF1	E of Wyman	Montcalm	MI	43.45°N 84.98°W	20:01–20:02	0.2 mi (0.32 km)	200 yd (180 m)	
EF1	Winfield	DuPage	IL	41.87°N 88.17°W	20:08–20:10	2.67 mi (4.30 km)	500 yd (460 m)	
EF0	WNW of Argyle	Sanilac	MI	43.5866°N 82.9853°W	23:07	0.5 mi (0.80 km)	25 yd (23 m)	

=== August 24 event ===
List of confirmed tornadoes – Friday, August 24, 2007
EF#	Location	County / Parish	State	Start Coord.	Time (UTC)	Path length	Max width	Summary
EF0	Dillon	Phelps	MO	37.97°N 91.72°W	19:50–19:51	1 mi (1.6 km)	75 yd (69 m)	
EF3	NNW of Charlotte to W of Potterville	Eaton	MI	42.59°N 84.83°W	20:25–20:30	6.5 mi (10.5 km)	300 yd (270 m)	
EF1	Lansing	Ingham	MI	42.6866°N 84.83°W	20:55–21:00	6 mi (9.7 km)	300 yd (270 m)	
EF0	NNW of Salem	Dent	MO	37.7569°N 91.6059°W	21:15	0.1 mi (0.16 km)	25 yd (23 m)	
EF0	S of Juddville	Shiawassee	MI	42.9922°N 83.98°W	21:23	0.25 mi (0.40 km)	50 yd (46 m)	
EF2	NE of Fowlerville to Fenton NE of Holly	Livingston, Genesee, Oakland	MI	42.7109°N 84.0144°W	21:30–22:07	23.52 mi (37.85 km)	440 yd (400 m)	
EF0	S of Everest	Brown	KS	39.6655°N 95.43°W	21:31–21:32	0.1 mi (0.16 km)	25 yd (23 m)	
EF0	NW of Lancaster	Atchison	KS	39.6211°N 95.3663°W	21:32–21:33	0.1 mi (0.16 km)	25 yd (23 m)	
EF0	WNW of Salem	Washtenaw	MI	42.4133°N 83.6134°W	22:02–22:07	2.47 mi (3.98 km)	50 yd (46 m)	
EF1	SSW of Hadley	Lapeer	MI	42.9233°N 83.4151°W	22:16–22:22	3.16 mi (5.09 km)	250 yd (230 m)	

=== August 26 event ===
List of confirmed tornadoes – Sunday, August 26, 2007
EF#	Location	County / Parish	State	Start Coord.	Time (UTC)	Path length	Max width	Summary
EF0	W of Union to WSW of Gardar	Cavalier, Pembina	ND	48.55°N 97.9955°W	23:55–00:05	5 mi (8.0 km)	30 yd (27 m)	
EF1	WSW of Crystal to W of Hoople	Pembina, Walsh	ND	48.5723°N 97.771°W	00:20–00:30	5.5 mi (8.9 km)	100 yd (91 m)	
EF0	NW of Nash	Walsh	ND	48.5723°N 97.771°W	00:40–00:46	3 mi (4.8 km)	75 yd (69 m)	
EF3	NNE of Aneta to NNW of Logan Center	Nelson, Grand Forks	ND	47.7601°N 97.9307°W	01:04–01:16	6 mi (9.7 km)	580 yd (530 m)	
EF0	NNW of Napoleon	Logan	ND	46.5801°N 99.8183°W	01:05–01:20	4.42 mi (7.11 km)	75 yd (69 m)	
EF0	NE of Napoleon	Logan	ND	46.5511°N 99.6957°W	01:35–01:40	1 mi (1.6 km)	35 yd (32 m)	
EF4	Northwood	Grand Forks	ND	47.7189°N 97.6097°W	01:42–01:54	5 mi (8.0 km)	1,400 yd (1,300 m)	1 death -
EF1	WSW of Florian	Marshall	MN	48.4389°N 96.6703°W	01:43–01:49	3 mi (4.8 km)	150 yd (140 m)	
EF1	SSW of Grand Forks	Grand Forks	ND	47.8244°N 97.1381°W	02:18–02:30	5 mi (8.0 km)	150 yd (140 m)	
EF0	ESE of Newfolden	Marshall	MN	48.3534°N 96.2697°W	02:49–03:01	0.5 mi (0.80 km)	30 yd (27 m)	
EF2	ENE of Reynolds, ND to WNW of Eldred, MN	Grand Forks (ND), Polk (MN)	ND, MN	47.7187°N 96.9611°W	03:00–03:10	5 mi (8.0 km)	300 yd (270 m)	

=== August 27 event ===
List of confirmed tornadoes – Monday, August 27, 2007
EF#	Location	County / Parish	State	Start Coord.	Time (UTC)	Path length	Max width	Summary
EF0	E of Alice	Jim Wells	TX	27.7433°N 97.96°W	17:05–17:06	0.12 mi (0.19 km)	25 yd (23 m)	

=== August 28 event ===
List of confirmed tornadoes – Tuesday, August 28, 2007
EF#	Location	County / Parish	State	Start Coord.	Time (UTC)	Path length	Max width	Summary
EF1	Uehling	Dodge	NE	41.73°N 96.5775°W	21:56–22:02	4.5 mi (7.2 km)	500 yd (460 m)	
EF0	N of Dedham	Carroll	IA	41.94°N 94.82°W	23:58	0.1 mi (0.16 km)	30 yd (27 m)	
EF0	N of Coon Rapids to W of Cooper	Carroll, Greene	IA	41.92°N 94.68°W	00:00–00:25	16.19 mi (26.06 km)	50 yd (46 m)	
EF0	W of Bayard	Guthrie	IA	41.85°N 94.65°W	00:02–00:03	0.72 mi (1.16 km)	50 yd (46 m)	
EF0	W of Angus to S of Rippey	Greene	IA	41.88°N 94.27°W	00:29–00:34	4.16 mi (6.69 km)	40 yd (37 m)	

== September ==
Confirmed tornadoes by Enhanced Fujita rating
EFU	EF0	EF1	EF2	EF3	EF4	EF5	Total
0	39	11	2	0	0	0	52

=== September 1 ===
List of confirmed tornadoes – Saturday, September 1, 2007
EF#	Location	County / Parish	State	Start Coord.	Time (UTC)	Path length	Max width	Summary
EF0	NE of Palmdale	Los Angeles	CA	34.6482°N 118.1205°W	23:20–23:25	0.05 mi (0.080 km)	10 yd (9.1 m)	A pilot at Palmdale Regional Airport reported a weak tornado on the ground southeast of the airport.
EF0	SW of Rosamond to SSE of Mojave	Kern	CA	34.8393°N 118.2074°W	23:30–23:50	13.05 mi (21.00 km)	75 yd (69 m)	Several fences were blown over and small trees and branches were snapped. The tornado then traveled north into Rosamond where numerous utility poles were blown over, branches were downed and some miscellaneous debris was found. Several mobile homes were damaged as well.

=== September 2 ===
List of confirmed tornadoes – Sunday, September 2, 2007
EF#	Location	County / Parish	State	Start Coord.	Time (UTC)	Path length	Max width	Summary
EF0	Mercedes	Hidalgo	TX	26.15°N 97.92°W	23:10–23:20	0.1 mi (0.16 km)	10 yd (9.1 m)	Mercedes police officers reported a weak tornado toppling a few trees in the city.

=== September 4 ===
List of confirmed tornadoes – Tuesday, September 4, 2007
EF#	Location	County / Parish	State	Start Coord.	Time (UTC)	Path length	Max width	Summary
EF0	N of Goliad	Goliad	TX	28.7304°N 97.38°W	21:00	0.06 mi (0.097 km)	30 yd (27 m)	A tornado was photographed as it remained over open country. No known damage occurred.
EF0	E of Gonzales	Gonzales	TX	29.5°N 97.3537°W	23:35–23:37	0.2 mi (0.32 km)	10 yd (9.1 m)	Some chicken coops were destroyed.

=== September 5 ===
List of confirmed tornadoes – Wednesday, September 5, 2007
EF#	Location	County / Parish	State	Start Coord.	Time (UTC)	Path length	Max width	Summary
EF0	SSW of Richland	Navarro	TX	31.8345°N 96.4717°W	12:42–12:46	0.8 mi (1.3 km)	40 yd (37 m)	A brief tornado caused minor tree damage.
EF2	SSE of Currie to NE of Richland	Navarro	TX	31.8345°N 96.4717°W	12:47–13:03	6.12 mi (9.85 km)	80 yd (73 m)	Trees were uprooted and trunks and large limbs snapped. A barn was destroyed and two metal transmission line towers were damaged. The tornado dissipated shortly after crossing I-45.
EF1	ENE of Mineola	Wood	TX	32.6838°N 95.4403°W	16:40–16:45	0.98 mi (1.58 km)	50 yd (46 m)	A few trees were snapped and large branches broke off other trees. An anchored mobile home was shifted off its foundation a few feet but not rolled. However, the porch associated with the mobile home was removed. A portion of a roof attached to an outbuilding was also removed.
EF0	N of Soda Springs	Caribou	ID	42.7801°N 111.58°W	18:54–19:04	7.52 mi (12.10 km)	50 yd (46 m)	Numerous tree were snapped.
EF1	E of Simms to W of Old Boston	Bowie	TX	33.35°N 94.4854°W	20:10–20:15	3 mi (4.8 km)	50 yd (46 m)	A tornado touched down in Old Union, removing a small portion of a roof to a home and pushing two metal garage doors inward. A few trees were either uprooted or snapped.

=== September 6 ===
Event in New Mexico associated with Hurricane Henriette.

List of confirmed tornadoes – Thursday, September 6, 2007
EF#	Location	County / Parish	State	Start Coord.	Time (UTC)	Path length	Max width	Summary
EF0	Clever	Christian	MO	37.03°N 93.47°W	10:20	0.5 mi (0.80 km)	50 yd (46 m)	A brief and weak tornado damaged a bank and trees surrounding it.
EF0	ESE of Jerseyville	Jersey	IL	39.0907°N 90.2288°W	19:15–19:18	0.9 mi (1.4 km)	50 yd (46 m)	A tornado touched down in a subdivision downing numerous trees and tree limbs. One home sustained minor soffit and siding damage. The tornado continued to the northeast, blowing down additional tree limbs and a couple of acres of corn as well as snapping tree limbs on the north before lifting and dissipating.
EF0	W of Tyrone	Grant	NM	32.65°N 108.504°W	19:45–20:00	3.05 mi (4.91 km)	40 yd (37 m)	A storm chaser photographed a landspout in a remote area.
EF0	S of Uehling	Dodge	NE	41.6866°N 96.5°W	22:27–22:32	3.16 mi (5.09 km)	50 yd (46 m)	Some farm buildings, trees and hay stacks were damaged.
EF0	W of Williamsville	Sangamon	IL	39.95°N 89.5689°W	23:28	0.1 mi (0.16 km)	10 yd (9.1 m)	A tornado briefly touched down in a field.

=== September 7 ===
List of confirmed tornadoes – Friday, September 7, 2007
EF#	Location	County / Parish	State	Start Coord.	Time (UTC)	Path length	Max width	Summary
EF1	ENE of Nazareth	Castro	TX	34.5699°N 102.0416°W	20:43–20:47	1.5 mi (2.4 km)	75 yd (69 m)	Two barns were severely damaged on a homestead.
EF0	SW of Tulia	Swisher	TX	34.4728°N 101.8395°W	21:50–21:56	1.25 mi (2.01 km)	75 yd (69 m)	Multiple employees at a cattle feed yard observed a tornado that developed over open country.

=== September 11 ===
List of confirmed tornadoes – Tuesday, September 11, 2007
EF#	Location	County / Parish	State	Start Coord.	Time (UTC)	Path length	Max width	Summary
EF0	S of Bayside	Aransas	TX	28.0733°N 97.2181°W	00:22–00:23	0.13 mi (0.21 km)	25 yd (23 m)	A waterspout formed over Copano Bay and traveled southwest. It made landfall and dissipated shortly after.

=== September 13 ===
Event is associated with Hurricane Humberto.

List of confirmed tornadoes – Thursday, September 13, 2007
EF#	Location	County / Parish	State	Start Coord.	Time (UTC)	Path length	Max width	Summary
EF1	WNW of Haire	Vermilion	LA	30.03°N 90.42°W	09:20	0.2 mi (0.32 km)	20 yd (18 m)	A home had its roof blown off. Trees and power lines were downed nearby.

=== September 14 ===
Event is associated with Hurricane Humberto.

List of confirmed tornadoes – Friday, September 14, 2007
EF#	Location	County / Parish	State	Start Coord.	Time (UTC)	Path length	Max width	Summary
EF0	Clemmons	Forsyth	NC	36.02°N 80.38°W	18:36–18:41	0.25 mi (0.40 km)	50 yd (46 m)	A weak and brief tornado touched down damaging the siding on several homes and knocking down multiple trees.
EF0	NNW of Thomasville	Davidson	NC	35.9374°N 80.1094°W	20:23–20:27	0.1 mi (0.16 km)	25 yd (23 m)	Law enforcement reported a tornado.
EF0	NW of Lillington	Harnett	NC	35.4102°N 78.8425°W	22:10–22:20	1.41 mi (2.27 km)	50 yd (46 m)	A brief tornado downed numerous trees.
EF0	WSW of Clayton	Johnston	NC	35.644°N 78.4925°W	22:15–22:20	0.73 mi (1.17 km)	25 yd (23 m)	A tornado occurred near Clayton Middle School.
EF0	S of Emit	Johnston	NC	35.6832°N 78.2772°W	22:44–22:50	0.38 mi (0.61 km)	25 yd (23 m)	A brief tornado was reported.
EF0	N of Benson	Johnston	NC	35.4884°N 78.55°W	22:50–22:52	0.25 mi (0.40 km)	25 yd (23 m)	Law enforcement reported a tornado and multiple trees down.
EF0	SW of Garner	Wake	NC	35.6924°N 78.654°W	23:25–23:27	0.1 mi (0.16 km)	25 yd (23 m)	Witnesses reported a brief tornado near Lake Benson.
EF1	ENE of Hickory Tavern	Laurens	SC	34.5311°N 82.1476°W	23:44	0.1 mi (0.16 km)	25 yd (23 m)	A house had its chimney blown off, several windows blown out, and had significant roof damage. A mobile home also had significant roof damage and was shifted off its foundation
EF0	Silver Beach to Wardtown	Northampton	VA	37.48°N 75.97°W	04:10–04:25	6.49 mi (10.44 km)	50 yd (46 m)	A waterspout came ashore in Silver Beach and downed a tree onto a car. Roof damage occurred to the recreation center at a Damage to an SUV from a downed tree and roof damage to the recreation center at a Camp YMCA. Damage also occurred to a barn, where the roof was completely removed. Further northeast, a tree pierced the roof of a home, a mobile home was displaced from its foundation, a trailer was completely destroyed by a falling tree, and some damage occurred to a church. In Wardtown, some damage was reported to a vehicle due to flying debris, and large trees were down in the convenience center, taking out the security fence.

=== September 16 ===
List of confirmed tornadoes – Sunday, September 16, 2007
EF#	Location	County / Parish	State	Start Coord.	Time (UTC)	Path length	Max width	Summary
EF0	Fort Myers Beach	Lee	FL	26.45°N 81.95°W	22:25–22:27	0.1 mi (0.16 km)	30 yd (27 m)	A waterspout from the Gulf of Mexico moved inland damaging the roof of a resort hotel and a nearby tiki bar.
EF1	Cape Coral	Lee	FL	26.55°N 81.98°W	22:33–22:58	4.4 mi (7.1 km)	50 yd (46 m)	About 138 homes were damaged. Six homes received moderate damage and one home was destroyed. The tornado snapped several power poles and damaged numerous fences, sheds and trees. Several vehicles and boats were flipped over. One injury occurred when a man was struck by debris.

=== September 20 ===
Events in Florida were associated with Tropical Depression Ten.

List of confirmed tornadoes – Thursday, September 20, 2007
EF#	Location	County / Parish	State	Start Coord.	Time (UTC)	Path length	Max width	Summary
EF0	Southwestern Woodbury	Washington	MN	44.9°N 92.95°W	23:30–23:31	0.4 mi (0.64 km)	50 yd (46 m)	Multiple townhouses were damaged, along with trees and road signs.
EF1	Eustis	Lake	FL	28.8368°N 81.6763°W	02:57–03:05	1.83 mi (2.95 km)	300 yd (270 m)	7 homes were destroyed, 27 homes received major damage and 81 homes had minor damage.
EF1	W of Mayo	Lafayette	FL	30.05°N 83.2535°W	04:20–04:21	0.25 mi (0.40 km)	35 yd (32 m)	Large oak trees were uprooted.

=== September 21 ===
Events were associated with Tropical Depression Ten.

List of confirmed tornadoes – Friday, September 21, 2007
EF#	Location	County / Parish	State	Start Coord.	Time (UTC)	Path length	Max width	Summary
EF0	ENE of Waresboro	Ware	GA	31.2543°N 82.468°W	08:45–09:00	0.63 mi (1.01 km)	100 yd (91 m)	Some mobile homes and outbuildings had damage to their roofing and skirting. A few trees and power lines were also blown down.
EF0	W of Blue Springs	Barbour	AL	31.6615°N 85.5735°W	22:34–22:35	0.36 mi (0.58 km)	20 yd (18 m)	A sheriff reported a tornado lofting debris, however, no debris was found.

=== September 22 ===
Event in Florida was associated with Tropical Depression Ten.

List of confirmed tornadoes – Saturday, September 22, 2007
EF#	Location	County / Parish	State	Start Coord.	Time (UTC)	Path length	Max width	Summary
EF0	Newport Beach	Orange	CA	33.62°N 117.93°W	18:00–18:01	0.1 mi (0.16 km)	15 yd (14 m)	A YouTube video was posted of a waterspout coming ashore into Newport Beach.
EF0	Encinitas	San Diego	CA	33.024°N 117.287°W	19:43–19:44	0.1 mi (0.16 km)	15 yd (14 m)	A waterspout made landfall at Cardiff State Beach. Several tents were thrown around.
EF0	W of Jerome	Collier	FL	26°N 81.3983°W	00:00–00:05	0.5 mi (0.80 km)	20 yd (18 m)	Motorists reported a brief tornado.

=== September 26 ===
List of confirmed tornadoes – Wednesday, September 26, 2007
EF#	Location	County / Parish	State	Start Coord.	Time (UTC)	Path length	Max width	Summary
EF0	WSW of Lakewood	Eddy	NM	32.5636°N 104.5603°W	20:34–20:44	5.05 mi (8.13 km)	200 yd (180 m)	A gas plant employee reported a tornado in an open field.
EF1	ENE of Tidioute	Warren	PA	41.6962°N 79.3676°W	22:00–22:10	3 mi (4.8 km)	50 yd (46 m)	Several hunting cabins and uninhabited dwellings were damaged. Hundreds of trees were also damaged.

=== September 27 ===
List of confirmed tornadoes – Thursday, September 27, 2007
EF#	Location	County / Parish	State	Start Coord.	Time (UTC)	Path length	Max width	Summary
EF0	SSE of Raymond	Racine	WI	42.7729°N 88.0048°W	20:49–20:50	0.25 mi (0.40 km)	20 yd (18 m)	A tornado tore up some mature corn crop, toppled a couple trees, ripped some roof shingles off of a pole shed, and then dissipated in an open field.
EF0	W of Cotton Center to ESE of Fieldton	Hale, Lamb	TX	34°N 102.0523°W	00:45–00:55	3.15 mi (5.07 km)	40 yd (37 m)	A pilot reported a tornado just west of Cotton Center. Although no structural damage occurred, farmers reported that the track of the tornado was visible through cotton and wheat fields.

=== September 28 ===
List of confirmed tornadoes – Friday, September 28, 2007
EF#	Location	County / Parish	State	Start Coord.	Time (UTC)	Path length	Max width	Summary
EF0	SSW of Grinnell	Gove	KS	38.9029°N 100.7511°W	00:21–00:22	0.25 mi (0.40 km)	10 yd (9.1 m)	A brief tornado touched down over open fields.
EF0	N of Lebanon	Linn	OR	44.5734°N 122.9°W	01:00–01:10	1 mi (1.6 km)	350 yd (320 m)	A tornado moved in an odd northwest direction. Six farm buildings had mainly their roofs damaged. Numerous trees were snapped with a few uprooted.

=== September 29 ===
Event is associated with Hurricane Lorenzo.

List of confirmed tornadoes – Saturday, September 29, 2007
EF#	Location	County / Parish	State	Start Coord.	Time (UTC)	Path length	Max width	Summary
EF1	Aransas Pass	San Patricio	TX	27.8971°N 97.1421°W	17:30–17:40	1.19 mi (1.92 km)	100 yd (91 m)	A waterspout moved onshore and uprooted several trees, removed a portion of terracotta roofing from a house, did minor roof damage to several homes and a severely damaged brick façade at the Dollar General store. In addition, the roof and steel awning at the Fresenius Medical Care Center was damaged. Several street signs were also knocked down and damage occurred to several vehicles. One injury was reported due to flying glass.
EF0	Port Aransas	Nueces	TX	27.8419°N 97.0564°W	17:40–17:41	0.19 mi (0.31 km)	25 yd (23 m)	A weak waterspout moved onshore in Port Aransas. Patio furniture and debris were scattered across yards and streets and some homes had minor roofing damage.

=== September 30 ===
List of confirmed tornadoes – Sunday, September 30, 2007
EF#	Location	County / Parish	State	Start Coord.	Time (UTC)	Path length	Max width	Summary
EF0	SW of Rock Valley	Sioux	IA	43.1489°N 96.3701°W	21:27	0.1 mi (0.16 km)	50 yd (46 m)	A brief tornado caused no damage.
EF0	NNW of Lytton to W of Jolley	Sac, Calhoun	IA	42.4567°N 94.885°W	23:26–23:30	4.2 mi (6.8 km)	30 yd (27 m)	A rope tornado occurred over open land.
EF2	NE of Pella to SE of Lynnville to W of Malcolm	Marion, Mahaska, Jasper, Poweshiek	IA	41.4632°N 92.8723°W	23:26–23:51	21.86 mi (35.18 km)	1,250 yd (1,140 m)	A strong tornado damaged homes and industrial buildings.
EF1	NNW of Malcolm to NW of Brooklyn	Poweshiek	IA	41.7421°N 92.5818°W	23:48–23:54	4.97 mi (8.00 km)	150 yd (140 m)	Three barns were destroyed.
EF0	Southern Baylis	Pike	IL	39.73°N 90.92°W	02:05	0.1 mi (0.16 km)	30 yd (27 m)	A tornado briefly touched down on a farm in southern Baylis where it destroyed a barn.
EF0	Southern Perry	Pike	IL	39.7706°N 90.7795°W	02:15–02:16	2 mi (3.2 km)	40 yd (37 m)	In southern Perry, a vacant mobile home had its roof and northwest corner ripped off. Another mobile home had a tree land on it causing extensive damage and two children were injured. 3 additional homes sustained window and shingle damage, a barn lost part of its roof, and numerous trees and tree limbs were blown down. Two vehicles sustained damage from fallen tree limbs.

== See also ==
- Tornadoes of 2007
- List of United States tornadoes from June to July 2007
- List of United States tornadoes from October to December 2007
