= Uehling, Nebraska =

- Village
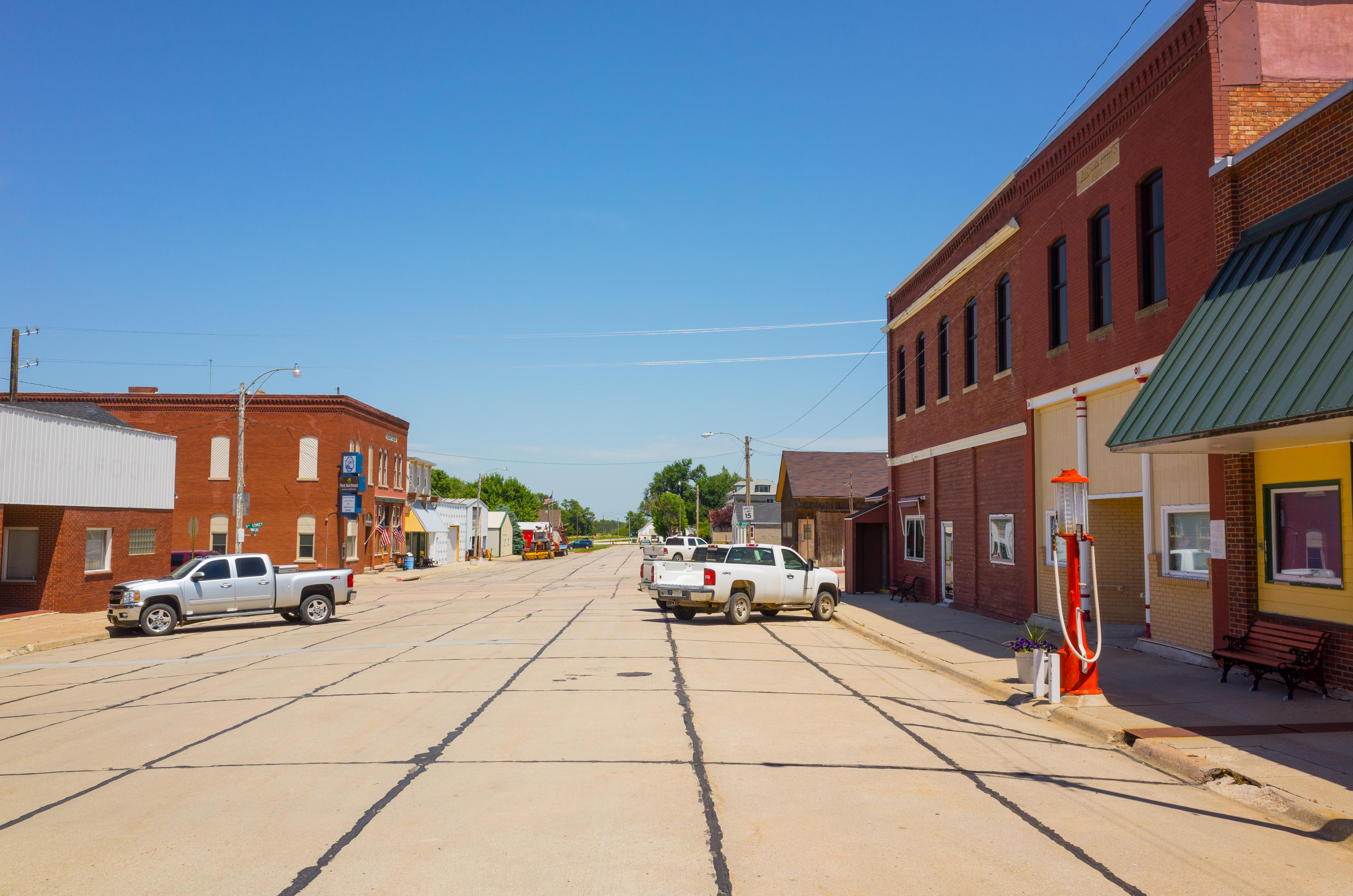

- Location of Uehling, Nebraska

- Location within Nebraska Location within the United States
- Coordinates: 41°44′05″N 96°30′20″W
- Country: United States
- State: Nebraska
- County: Dodge
- Township: Logan

Area
  - Total: 0.22 sq mi (0.58 km^{2})
  - Land: 0.22 sq mi (0.58 km^{2})
  - Water: 0 sq mi (0.00 km^{2})
- Elevation: 1,247 ft (380 m)

Population (2020)
  - Total: 241
  - Density: 1,077.0/sq mi (415.82/km^{2})
- Time zone: UTC-6 (Central (CST))
  - Summer (DST): UTC-5 (CDT)
- ZIP code: 68063
- Area code: 402
- FIPS code: 31-49425
- GNIS feature ID: 2400015
- Website: www.uehlingne.org

Uehling is a village in Dodge County, Nebraska, United States. The population was 241 at the 2020 census.

== History ==
Uehling was laid out in 1905 when the railroad was extended to that point. It was named for Theodore Uehling, the original owner of the town site. Uehling was incorporated as a village in 1906.

== Geography ==
According to the United States Census Bureau, the village has a total area of 0.22 square miles (0.57 km^{2}), all land.

== Demographics ==
Historical population
Census	Pop.	Note	%±
1910	228		—
1920	267		17.1%
1930	297		11.2%
1940	253		−14.8%
1950	250		−1.2%
1960	231		−7.6%
1970	249		7.8%
1980	273		9.6%
1990	273		0.0%
2000	275		0.7%
2010	230		−16.4%
2020	241		4.8%
U.S. Decennial Census

=== 2010 census ===
As of the census of 2010, there were 230 people, 110 households, and 67 families living in the village. The population density was 1,045.5 inhabitants per square mile (403.7/km^{2}). There were 132 housing units at an average density of 600.0 per square mile (231.7/km^{2}). The racial makeup of the village was 97.0% White, 0.4% Native American, 1.7% from other races, and 0.9% from two or more races. Hispanic or Latino of any race were 3.0% of the population.

There were 110 households, of which 22.7% had children under the age of 18 living with them, 50.0% were married couples living together, 8.2% had a female householder with no husband present, 2.7% had a male householder with no wife present, and 39.1% were non-families. 32.7% of all households were made up of individuals, and 15.5% had someone living alone who was 65 years of age or older. The average household size was 2.09 and the average family size was 2.64.

The median age in the village was 46.8 years. 20.9% of residents were under the age of 18; 5.7% were between the ages of 18 and 24; 19.6% were from 25 to 44; 29.6% were from 45 to 64; and 24.3% were 65 years of age or older. The gender makeup of the village was 48.3% male and 51.7% female.

=== 2000 census ===
As of the census of 2000, there were 275 people, 122 households, and 71 families living in the village. The population density was 1,288.8 inhabitants per square mile (497.6/km^{2}). There were 133 housing units at an average density of 623.3 per square mile (240.7/km^{2}). The racial makeup of the village was 96.73% White, 2.55% Native American, 0.36% Asian, and 0.36% from two or more races.

There were 122 households, out of which 25.4% had children under the age of 18 living with them, 47.5% were married couples living together, 7.4% had a female householder with no husband present, and 41.0% were non-families. 36.9% of all households were made up of individuals, and 21.3% had someone living alone who was 65 years of age or older. The average household size was 2.25 and the average family size was 2.90.

In the village, the population was spread out, with 27.3% under the age of 18, 4.4% from 18 to 24, 25.1% from 25 to 44, 22.2% from 45 to 64, and 21.1% who were 65 years of age or older. The median age was 40 years. For every 100 females, there were 109.9 males. For every 100 females age 18 and over, there were 92.3 males.

As of 2000 the median income for a household in the village was $30,000, and the median income for a family was $39,821. Males had a median income of $27,083 versus $27,083 for females. The per capita income for the village was $15,349. About 4.9% of families and 5.1% of the population were below the poverty line, including 4.9% of those under the age of eighteen and none of those 65 or over.
