= North Fork, Missouri =

Unincorporated community in Missouri, U.S.

Coordinates: 39°36′40″N 91°55′09″W

North Fork is an unincorporated community in Monroe County, in the U.S. state of Missouri.

== History ==
A post office called North Fork was established in 1836, and remained in operation until 1906. The community takes its name from the nearby North Fork Salt River.
