= Macedonia, Kentucky =

Unincorporated community in Kentucky, United States

- Unincorporated community
- Location within the state of Kentucky Macedonia (the United States)
- Coordinates: 37°37′39″N 83°52′8″W
- Country: United States
- State: Kentucky
- County: Estill
- Elevation: 1,083 ft (330 m)
- Time zone: UTC-5 (Eastern (EST))
  - Summer (DST): UTC-4 (EDT)
- GNIS feature ID: 2440459

Macedonia is an unincorporated community located in Estill County, Kentucky, United States. Its name is derived from the ancient Greek Kingdom of Macedonia.
