= List of United States tornadoes from June to July 2007 =

This page documents all the tornadoes that touched down in the United States in June and July, 2007. Tornadoes in the month of January are given with their Fujita Scale intensity while all tornadoes from February and on are given with their Enhanced Fujita Scale intensity. This is because the scale was changed on February 1 due to the National Weather Service implementing a more accurate way to classify tornadoes.

== United States yearly total ==
Confirmed tornadoes by Enhanced Fujita rating
EFU	EF0	EF1	EF2	EF3	EF4	EF5	Total
0	675	298	91	27	4	1	1,096

- Note: January tornadoes were rated using the old Fujita scale, but are included in the chart above by matching the F rating to the related EF scale rating.

== June ==
Confirmed tornadoes by Enhanced Fujita rating
EFU	EF0	EF1	EF2	EF3	EF4	EF5	Total
0	100	21	4	2	0	0	127

=== June 1 event ===
Events in Florida were associated with Tropical Storm Barry.

List of confirmed tornadoes – Friday, June 1, 2007 (Note: All dates are based on the local time zone where the tornado touched down; however, all times are in Coordinated Universal Time for consistency.)
EF#	Location	County / Parish	State	Start Coord.	Time (UTC)	Path length	Max width	Summary
EF0	Sugarloaf Key	Monroe	FL	24.6611°N 81.5206°W	16:55–16:56	0.55 mi (0.89 km)	30 yd (27 m)	
EF3	Grandview to Muscatine	Louisa, Muscatine	IA	41.2693°N 91.1941°W	17:07–17:31	15.75 mi (25.35 km)	774 yd (708 m)	
EF1	NNE of Lime City	Cedar	IA	41.684°N 91.059°W	17:44–17:45	1.05 mi (1.69 km)	75 yd (69 m)	
EF2	NE of Springbrook, IA to SW of Blanding, IL	Jackson (IA), Jo Daviess (IL)	IA, IL	42.2092°N 90.4272°W	19:28–19:38	3.44 mi (5.54 km)	350 yd (320 m)	
EF0	S of Scales Mound	Jo Daviess	IL	42.4499°N 90.25°W	20:15	0.5 mi (0.80 km)	10 yd (9.1 m)	
EF0	S of Shullsburg	Lafayette	WI	42.5159°N 90.216°W	20:17–20:18	0.1 mi (0.16 km)	20 yd (18 m)	
EF0	WNW of Dunbarton	Lafayette	WI	42.5785°N 90.1688°W	20:31–20:32	0.23 mi (0.37 km)	30 yd (27 m)	
EF0	W of Ellsworth	Hamilton	IA	41.684°N 91.059°W	23:30	0.1 mi (0.16 km)	30 yd (27 m)	
EF0	E of Seminole	Gaines	TX	32.72°N 102.3922°W	00:25–00:35	2.5 mi (4.0 km)	50 yd (46 m)	
EF1	Cutler Bay to W of Palmetto Estates	Miami-Dade	FL	25.57°N 80.35°W	01:45–01:58	3.93 mi (6.32 km)	75 yd (69 m)	

=== June 2 event ===
List of confirmed tornadoes – Saturday, June 2, 2007
EF#	Location	County / Parish	State	Start Coord.	Time (UTC)	Path length	Max width	Summary
EF0	SSW of Jackson	Washington	WI	43.2917°N 88.1861°W	19:19	0.01 mi (0.016 km)	15 yd (14 m)	
EF0	N of Tracy	Lyon	MN	44.3601°N 95.62°W	23:35–23:37	0.5 mi (0.80 km)	100 yd (91 m)	
EF0	SW of Dimmitt	Castro	TX	34.4733°N 102.413°W	00:55–00:57	0.2 mi (0.32 km)	30 yd (27 m)	
EF0	SSW of Dimmitt	Castro	TX	34.383°N 102.4039°W	01:15–01:30	4 mi (6.4 km)	300 yd (270 m)	
EF0	SSW of Warsaw	Hancock	IL	40.3233°N 91.4445°W	01:45	0.1 mi (0.16 km)	25 yd (23 m)	
EF0	SSE of Earth	Lamb	TX	34.1599°N 102.3649°W	02:14–02:15	0.15 mi (0.24 km)	100 yd (91 m)	
EF0	WSW of Justiceburg	Garza	TX	32.9954°N 101.2996°W	03:34–03:36	0.75 mi (1.21 km)	100 yd (91 m)	
EF0	S of Littlefield to NNE of Whitharral	Lamb, Hockley	TX	33.8513°N 102.32°W	03:35–03:44	2.25 mi (3.62 km)	100 yd (91 m)	
EF0	W of Levelland	Hockley	TX	33.58°N 102.396°W	04:03–04:05	1 mi (1.6 km)	75 yd (69 m)	
EF0	SSE of Loop	Gaines	TX	32.8532°N 102.3871°W	05:40–05:45	1 mi (1.6 km)	50 yd (46 m)	

=== June 3 event ===
List of confirmed tornadoes – Sunday, June 3, 2007
EF#	Location	County / Parish	State	Start Coord.	Time (UTC)	Path length	Max width	Summary
EF0	Herscher	Kankakee	IL	41.05°N 88.1°W	17:47–17:48	0.4 mi (0.64 km)	10 yd (9.1 m)	
EF1	E of Jackson	Washington	WI	43.337°N 88.0722°W	19:10–19:20	0.45 mi (0.72 km)	50 yd (46 m)	
EF0	E of Andrews	Andrews	TX	32.32°N 102.4816°W	19:40–19:45	2.77 mi (4.46 km)	50 yd (46 m)	
EF0	SE of Potosi	Grant	WI	42.6596°N 90.6922°W	20:22–20:24	0.25 mi (0.40 km)	30 yd (27 m)	
EF0	SW of Ocate	Mora	NM	36.1289°N 105.1133°W	20:30–20:31	0.25 mi (0.40 km)	10 yd (9.1 m)	
EF0	Potosi	Grant	WI	42.68°N 90.72°W	20:30–20:32	0.2 mi (0.32 km)	20 yd (18 m)	
EF0	S of Tennyson	Grant	WI	42.6511°N 90.68°W	20:40–20:42	0.25 mi (0.40 km)	30 yd (27 m)	
EF0	E of Kermit	Winkler	TX	31.85°N 102.9509°W	21:36–21:42	4 mi (6.4 km)	50 yd (46 m)	
EF0	W of Notrees	Ector	TX	31.92°N 102.7841°W	21:48–21:49	0.5 mi (0.80 km)	1,320 yd (1,210 m)	
EF0	NNW of Elida	Roosevelt	NM	33.9701°N 103.67°W	23:18–23:19	0.25 mi (0.40 km)	10 yd (9.1 m)	
EF0	N of Mentone	Loving	TX	31.859°N 103.6°W	23:38–23:42	2 mi (3.2 km)	50 yd (46 m)	
EF0	WNW of Pep	Roosevelt	NM	33.8537°N 103.4188°W	23:43–23:44	0.25 mi (0.40 km)	10 yd (9.1 m)	
EF0	ESE of Shawano	Shawano	WI	44.76°N 88.57°W	00:11	0.1 mi (0.16 km)	10 yd (9.1 m)	

=== June 4 event ===
List of confirmed tornadoes – Monday, June 4, 2007
EF#	Location	County / Parish	State	Start Coord.	Time (UTC)	Path length	Max width	Summary
EF0	Ashboro	Clay	IN	39.4°N 87.1°W	22:30–22:40	2.5 mi (4.0 km)	200 yd (180 m)	
EF0	NE of Capitan	Lincoln	NM	33.6829°N 105.4204°W	23:00–23:02	0.25 mi (0.40 km)	10 yd (9.1 m)	

=== June 6 event ===
List of confirmed tornadoes – Wednesday, June 6, 2007
EF#	Location	County / Parish	State	Start Coord.	Time (UTC)	Path length	Max width	Summary
EF0	SW of Gillette	Campbell	WY	44.16°N 105.6°W	20:35–20:47	3.72 mi (5.99 km)	30 yd (27 m)	
EF0	SSW of Rozet	Campbell	WY	44.17°N 105.24°W	20:54–20:56	0.5 mi (0.80 km)	10 yd (9.1 m)	
EF1	ENE of Porcupine to NW of Allen	Oglala Lakota, Bennett, Jackson	SD	43.29°N 102.2°W	21:10–21:35	7.16 mi (11.52 km)	400 yd (370 m)	
EF0	SW of Kadoka	Jackson	SD	43.6562°N 101.7606°W	22:49–22:52	0.5 mi (0.80 km)	10 yd (9.1 m)	
EF0	NE of Arnold	Custer	NE	41.5322°N 100.0635°W	02:20	0.1 mi (0.16 km)	20 yd (18 m)	

=== June 7 event ===
List of confirmed tornadoes – Thursday, June 7, 2007
EF#	Location	County / Parish	State	Start Coord.	Time (UTC)	Path length	Max width	Summary
EF0	N of Columbia	Marion	IA	41.24°N 93.15°W	17:48	0.2 mi (0.32 km)	30 yd (27 m)	
EF0	ESE of Everdell	Wilkin	MN	46.2562°N 96.3719°W	18:25	0.2 mi (0.32 km)	25 yd (23 m)	
EF1	WSW of Elizabeth to S of Erhard	Otter Tail	MN	46.3745°N 96.1494°W	18:41–18:52	5.8 mi (9.3 km)	100 yd (91 m)	
EF2	E of Pelican Rapids to W of Vergas	Otter Tail	MN	46.57°N 95.9959°W	19:10–19:25	7 mi (11 km)	150 yd (140 m)	
EF0	N of Plano	Appanoose	IA	40.78°N 93.05°W	19:35	0.15 mi (0.24 km)	25 yd (23 m)	
EF2	W of Peplin to N of Pike Lake	Marathon	WI	44.778°N 89.478°W	21:01–21:14	7.3 mi (11.7 km)	225 yd (206 m)	
EF0	SSW of La Belle	Hendry	FL	26.72°N 81.45°W	21:20–21:25	1.24 mi (2.00 km)	40 yd (37 m)	
EF0	SW of Wisconsin Rapids	Wood	WI	44.37°N 89.8741°W	21:26	0.04 mi (0.064 km)	40 yd (37 m)	
EF3	ENE of Mattoon to SE of White Lake to ENE of Lakewood	Shawano, Menominee, Langlade, Oconto	WI	45.009°N 88.997°W	21:31–22:18	40.1 mi (64.5 km)	1,320 yd (1,210 m)	
EF1	Cedarville	Marinette	WI	45.45°N 87.99°W	22:37–22:40	3 mi (4.8 km)	200 yd (180 m)	
EF0	W of Banat	Menominee	MI	45.52°N 87.7825°W	22:47–22:48	0.25 mi (0.40 km)	125 yd (114 m)	
EF1	W of Harmony	Marinette	WI	45.099°N 87.892°W	23:16–23:20	3.6 mi (5.8 km)	200 yd (180 m)	

=== June 9 event ===
List of confirmed tornadoes – Saturday, June 9, 2007
EF#	Location	County / Parish	State	Start Coord.	Time (UTC)	Path length	Max width	Summary
EF0	S of Domingo	Sandoval, Santa Fe	NM	35.4711°N 106.32°W	21:33–21:48	4.25 mi (6.84 km)	18 yd (16 m)	
EF0	NW of Los Cerrillos	Santa Fe	NM	35.4607°N 105.1676°W	22:10–22:11	0.1 mi (0.16 km)	8 yd (7.3 m)	

=== June 10 event ===
List of confirmed tornadoes – Sunday, June 10, 2007
EF#	Location	County / Parish	State	Start Coord.	Time (UTC)	Path length	Max width	Summary
EF0	S of Lamar	Barton	MO	37.49°N 94.28°W	22:08–22:10	0.5 mi (0.80 km)	200 yd (180 m)	
EF0	W of Weir	Cherokee	KS	37.3°N 94.8063°W	22:25–22:27	0.1 mi (0.16 km)	50 yd (46 m)	

=== June 11 event ===
List of confirmed tornadoes – Monday, June 11, 2007
EF#	Location	County / Parish	State	Start Coord.	Time (UTC)	Path length	Max width	Summary
EF0	White Oak	Fairfield	SC	34.48°N 81.125°W	19:52–20:00	1.1 mi (1.8 km)	80 yd (73 m)	
EF1	SW of Crosby	Divide	ND	48.7053°N 103.606°W	22:44–22:54	3 mi (4.8 km)	70 yd (64 m)	
EF0	W of Crosby	Divide	ND	48.92°N 103.302°W	22:45–22:50	1.41 mi (2.27 km)	60 yd (55 m)	

=== June 12 event ===
List of confirmed tornadoes – Tuesday, June 12, 2007
EF#	Location	County / Parish	State	Start Coord.	Time (UTC)	Path length	Max width	Summary
EF0	NW of Summer Haven	St. Johns	FL	29.7102°N 81.2318°W	15:24–15:25	1 mi (1.6 km)	50 yd (46 m)	
EF0	SSW of Max	McLean	ND	47.7131°N 101.3658°W	19:43–19:55	6.2 mi (10.0 km)	50 yd (46 m)	
EF0	N of Sawyer	Ward, McHenry	ND	48.1311°N 100.9735°W	20:30–20:38	4.35 mi (7.00 km)	50 yd (46 m)	

=== June 13 event ===
List of confirmed tornadoes – Wednesday, June 13, 2007
EF#	Location	County / Parish	State	Start Coord.	Time (UTC)	Path length	Max width	Summary
EF0	Naval Air Station Jacksonville	Duval	FL	30.22°N 81.67°W	18:01–18:02	0.18 mi (0.29 km)	10 yd (9.1 m)	
EF0	N of Butler	Baltimore	MD	39.5589°N 76.73°W	21:10–21:17	2 mi (3.2 km)	75 yd (69 m)	
EF0	W of Orienta	Major	OK	36.35°N 98.5697°W	23:31–23:33	0.2 mi (0.32 km)	25 yd (23 m)	
EF0	W of Orienta	Major	OK	36.35°N 98.5697°W	23:34–23:36	0.2 mi (0.32 km)	75 yd (69 m)	
EF0	W of Orienta	Major	OK	36.35°N 98.5697°W	23:42–23:44	0.2 mi (0.32 km)	50 yd (46 m)	
EF0	WSW of Eagle City	Blaine	OK	35.9189°N 98.613°W	01:06	0.1 mi (0.16 km)	30 yd (27 m)	

=== June 14 event ===
List of confirmed tornadoes – Thursday, June 14, 2007
EF#	Location	County / Parish	State	Start Coord.	Time (UTC)	Path length	Max width	Summary
EF0	SSE of Clearbrook	Clearwater	MN	47.67°N 95.4°W	22:18	0.2 mi (0.32 km)	25 yd (23 m)	
EF0	NE of Redlake	Beltrami	MN	47.88°N 95.02°W	22:55	0.2 mi (0.32 km)	25 yd (23 m)	

=== June 15 event ===
List of confirmed tornadoes – Friday, June 15, 2007
EF#	Location	County / Parish	State	Start Coord.	Time (UTC)	Path length	Max width	Summary
EF0	Coral Gables	Miami-Dade	FL	25.6782°N 80.2558°W	23:33	0.05 mi (0.080 km)	20 yd (18 m)	
EF1	SSW of Ozona	Crockett	TX	30.6046°N 101.2459°W	03:40–03:48	3.16 mi (5.09 km)	100 yd (91 m)	

=== June 16 event ===
List of confirmed tornadoes – Saturday, June 16, 2007
EF#	Location	County / Parish	State	Start Coord.	Time (UTC)	Path length	Max width	Summary
EF1	SSE of Hughesville	Judith Basin	MT	46.9628°N 110.5848°W	23:31–23:41	5.28 mi (8.50 km)	100 yd (91 m)	
EF1	ENE of Spearfish to NW of Whitewood	Lawrence	SD	44.494°N 103.754°W	02:00–02:04	4.03 mi (6.49 km)	70 yd (64 m)	
EF0	E of Moffit	Burleigh	ND	46.68°N 100.1114°W	05:25–05:30	1 mi (1.6 km)	30 yd (27 m)	
EF0	NE of Sterling	Burleigh	ND	46.8711°N 100.2053°W	05:57–05:59	1 mi (1.6 km)	30 yd (27 m)	

=== June 17 event ===
List of confirmed tornadoes – Sunday, June 17, 2007
EF#	Location	County / Parish	State	Start Coord.	Time (UTC)	Path length	Max width	Summary
EF0	W of Leonard to Enderlin	Cass, Ransom	ND	46.65°N 97.6291°W	09:30–09:35	2 mi (3.2 km)	50 yd (46 m)	
EF0	NNE of Girard	Polk	MN	47.76°N 96.67°W	21:11–21:13	0.5 mi (0.80 km)	25 yd (23 m)	
EF0	ENE of Kempner to Copperas Cove	Lampasas, Coryell	TX	31.0883°N 97.9766°W	23:15–23:21	1 mi (1.6 km)	30 yd (27 m)	
EF0	ENE of Lowry	Walworth	SD	45.36°N 99.83°W	01:40–01:41	0.1 mi (0.16 km)	10 yd (9.1 m)	
EF0	ESE of Java	Walworth	SD	45.42°N 99.72°W	01:42–01:45	0.1 mi (0.16 km)	10 yd (9.1 m)	
EF0	E of Java	Walworth	SD	45.49°N 99.73°W	01:47–01:53	0.2 mi (0.32 km)	20 yd (18 m)	
EF0	NW of Akaska	Walworth	SD	45.4°N 100.22°W	01:50–01:52	0.1 mi (0.16 km)	10 yd (9.1 m)	
EF0	WNW of Dahlen	Nelson	ND	48.17°N 97.99°W	02:50	0.2 mi (0.32 km)	25 yd (23 m)	

=== June 18 event ===
List of confirmed tornadoes – Monday, June 18, 2007
EF#	Location	County / Parish	State	Start Coord.	Time (UTC)	Path length	Max width	Summary
EF0	Miami Beach	Miami-Dade	FL	25.8°N 80.12°W	13:20–13:21	0.1 mi (0.16 km)	30 yd (27 m)	
EF0	Ozark	Christian	MO	37.02°N 93.21°W	00:00–00:02	1 mi (1.6 km)	75 yd (69 m)	
EF0	NE of Belleview	Marion	FL	29.1026°N 82.0127°W	01:07–01:08	0.01 mi (0.016 km)	10 yd (9.1 m)	
EF1	Lake Providence	East Carroll	LA	32.8°N 91.18°W	05:34–05:36	1.8 mi (2.9 km)	400 yd (370 m)	

=== June 19 event ===
List of confirmed tornadoes – Tuesday, June 19, 2007
EF#	Location	County / Parish	State	Start Coord.	Time (UTC)	Path length	Max width	Summary
EF0	SSW of Trinity	Morgan	AL	34.5892°N 87.0949°W	18:00–18:01	0.25 mi (0.40 km)	25 yd (23 m)	
EF0	SE of Tasco	Sheridan	KS	39.3193°N 100.2603°W	19:35–19:53	2 mi (3.2 km)	50 yd (46 m)	
EF0	NW of Pritchett	Baca	CO	37.4109°N 102.9215°W	19:55–20:25	3.06 mi (4.92 km)	75 yd (69 m)	
EF0	NE of Muncy	Lycoming	PA	41.2053°N 76.7929°W	20:50–20:57	1 mi (1.6 km)	70 yd (64 m)	
EF0	Carville	Iberville	LA	30.22°N 91.1°W	23:55–00:00	0.1 mi (0.16 km)	20 yd (18 m)	
EF0	S of Hugoton	Stevens	KS	37.1439°N 101.35°W	02:06–02:08	0.8 mi (1.3 km)	50 yd (46 m)	
EF0	NNE of Baker	Texas	OK	36.8834°N 101.0131°W	02:38–02:45	2.24 mi (3.60 km)	50 yd (46 m)	

=== June 20 event ===
List of confirmed tornadoes – Wednesday, June 20, 2007
EF#	Location	County / Parish	State	Start Coord.	Time (UTC)	Path length	Max width	Summary
EF1	SW of Figure Five	Crawford	AR	35.4893°N 94.4077°W	16:35–16:36	0.6 mi (0.97 km)	250 yd (230 m)	
EF0	ESE of Sierra Blanca	Hudspeth	TX	31.134°N 105.2464°W	20:05–20:10	0.19 mi (0.31 km)	100 yd (91 m)	

=== June 21 event ===
List of confirmed tornadoes – Thursday, June 21, 2007
EF#	Location	County / Parish	State	Start Coord.	Time (UTC)	Path length	Max width	Summary
EF1	Sheldrake	Seneca	NY	42.67°N 76.68°W	19:46–19:55	1.5 mi (2.4 km)	100 yd (91 m)	This is the first tornado recorded in Seneca County.
EF0	S of Kelsey	Butler	IA	42.6266°N 92.92°W	20:51	0.1 mi (0.16 km)	25 yd (23 m)	
EF0	SSE of Holmes	Wright	IA	42.7°N 93.8°W	20:55	0.1 mi (0.16 km)	30 yd (27 m)	
EF0	WSW of Shell Rock	Butler	IA	42.71°N 92.64°W	21:24	0.1 mi (0.16 km)	30 yd (27 m)	
EF0	NNW of Kelley	Story	IA	42.9607°N 93.686°W	21:58	0.1 mi (0.16 km)	30 yd (27 m)	
EF0	SSW of Castle Hill	Black Hawk	IA	42.5°N 92.41°W	22:22	0.1 mi (0.16 km)	30 yd (27 m)	
EF0	Samuel R. McKelvie National Forest	Cherry	NE	42.7118°N 101.0412°W	01:05	0.1 mi (0.16 km)	20 yd (18 m)	
EF1	N of Cody	Cherry	NE	42.9734°N 101.25°W	01:15–01:21	3 mi (4.8 km)	50 yd (46 m)	

=== June 22 event ===
List of confirmed tornadoes – Friday, June 22, 2007
EF#	Location	County / Parish	State	Start Coord.	Time (UTC)	Path length	Max width	Summary
EF0	W of Beaver Creek	Rock	MN	43.62°N 96.39°W	06:19–06:21	0.2 mi (0.32 km)	50 yd (46 m)	
EF2	Cumming to southern Norwalk	Warren	IA	41.4891°N 93.775°W	21:35–21:49	6.36 mi (10.24 km)	150 yd (140 m)	
EF1	Norwalk	Warren	IA	41.4899°N 93.6855°W	21:40–21:50	3 mi (4.8 km)	150 yd (140 m)	
EF0	N of St. Paul	Lee	IA	40.7845°N 91.52°W	00:04	0.3 mi (0.48 km)	75 yd (69 m)	
EF1	S of Upham	McHenry	ND	48.4933°N 100.72°W	00:30–00:45	0.5 mi (0.80 km)	250 yd (230 m)	

=== June 24 event ===
List of confirmed tornadoes – Sunday, June 24, 2007
EF#	Location	County / Parish	State	Start Coord.	Time (UTC)	Path length	Max width	Summary
EF0	WNW of Marathon	Monroe	FL	24.7028°N 81.0874°W	17:58–18:00	0.57 mi (0.92 km)	30 yd (27 m)	
EF1	N of Greenbush to WNW of Badger	Roseau	MN	48.8012°N 96.18°W	01:53–02:00	3 mi (4.8 km)	50 yd (46 m)	
EF0	NW of Fox	Roseau	MN	48.85°N 95.92°W	02:26	0.2 mi (0.32 km)	25 yd (23 m)	
EF0	ENE of Salol	Roseau	MN	48.89°N 95.47°W	02:59	0.2 mi (0.32 km)	25 yd (23 m)	
EF1	ESE of Angle Inlet	Lake of the Woods	MN	49.33°N 95°W	03:35	0.5 mi (0.80 km)	50 yd (46 m)	

=== June 25 event ===
List of confirmed tornadoes – Monday, June 25, 2007
EF#	Location	County / Parish	State	Start Coord.	Time (UTC)	Path length	Max width	Summary
EF0	S of Cloudcroft	Otero	NM	32.9235°N 105.7194°W	20:47–20:55	0.19 mi (0.31 km)	20 yd (18 m)	
EF0	McGregor	McLennan	TX	31.43°N 97.42°W	02:25–02:28	1 mi (1.6 km)	30 yd (27 m)	
EF0	NE of Decatur	Wise	TX	33.2709°N 97.5511°W	05:15–05:25	4 mi (6.4 km)	40 yd (37 m)	

=== June 26 event ===
List of confirmed tornadoes – Tuesday, June 26, 2007
EF#	Location	County / Parish	State	Start Coord.	Time (UTC)	Path length	Max width	Summary
EF0	Cedar Hill	Dallas	TX	32.58°N 96.95°W	23:00–23:05	1 mi (1.6 km)	40 yd (37 m)	
EF0	S of Venus	Johnson	TX	32.3866°N 97.12°W	23:40–23:42	0.2 mi (0.32 km)	30 yd (27 m)	

=== June 27 event ===
List of confirmed tornadoes – Wednesday, June 27, 2007
EF#	Location	County / Parish	State	Start Coord.	Time (UTC)	Path length	Max width	Summary
EF1	NW of Woodland Park	Teller	CO	39.0684°N 105.158°W	21:26–21:36	0.88 mi (1.42 km)	200 yd (180 m)	
EF1	W of Letart	Mason	WV	38.88°N 81.9393°W	22:35–22:38	1.16 mi (1.87 km)	50 yd (46 m)	

=== June 29 event ===
List of confirmed tornadoes – Friday, June 29, 2007
EF#	Location	County / Parish	State	Start Coord.	Time (UTC)	Path length	Max width	Summary
EF0	S of Westcliffe	Custer	CO	38.0433°N 105.47°W	22:10–22:15	1 mi (1.6 km)	75 yd (69 m)	
EF0	E of Orofino	Clearwater	ID	46.48°N 115.9351°W	01:49–02:00	0.25 mi (0.40 km)	50 yd (46 m)	This is the first recorded tornado in Clearwater County.

=== June 30 event ===
List of confirmed tornadoes – Saturday, June 30, 2007
EF#	Location	County / Parish	State	Start Coord.	Time (UTC)	Path length	Max width	Summary
EF0	SW of Eudora	Polk	MO	37.4596°N 93.5758°W	18:40–18:42	0.75 mi (1.21 km)	50 yd (46 m)	
EF0	SSW of Ozark	Christian	MO	37°N 93.23°W	20:25	0.1 mi (0.16 km)	50 yd (46 m)	
EF0	Southeastern Marshfield	Webster	MO	37.34°N 92.91°W	22:40	0.1 mi (0.16 km)	50 yd (46 m)	

== July ==
Confirmed tornadoes by Enhanced Fujita rating
EFU	EF0	EF1	EF2	EF3	EF4	EF5	Total
0	49	15	4	0	0	0	68

=== July 2 event ===
List of confirmed tornadoes – Monday, July 2, 2007
EF#	Location	County / Parish	State	Start Coord.	Time (UTC)	Path length	Max width	Summary
EF0	Royal Palm Beach	Palm Beach	FL	26.71°N 80.25°W	22:30–22:35	1.38 mi (2.22 km)	20 yd (18 m)	

=== July 3 event ===
List of confirmed tornadoes – Tuesday, July 3, 2007
EF#	Location	County / Parish	State	Start Coord.	Time (UTC)	Path length	Max width	Summary
EF0	Lake Livingston	San Jacinto	TX	30.7527°N 95.1427°W	14:37–14:38	0.1 mi (0.16 km)	10 yd (9.1 m)	
EF0	NNW of Flagler	Kit Carson	CO	39.3801°N 103.1129°W	21:14–21:18	0.5 mi (0.80 km)	10 yd (9.1 m)	
EF0	N of Seibert	Kit Carson	CO	39.4735°N 102.88°W	21:21–21:41	3 mi (4.8 km)	20 yd (18 m)	
EF0	NNW of Seibert	Kit Carson	CO	39.4202°N 102.9444°W	21:31–21:35	0.5 mi (0.80 km)	10 yd (9.1 m)	
EF0	NNW of Seibert	Kit Carson	CO	39.3935°N 102.9301°W	21:36–21:51	1.5 mi (2.4 km)	20 yd (18 m)	
EF0	NNW of Seibert	Kit Carson	CO	39.3935°N 102.9301°W	21:45–21:49	0.5 mi (0.80 km)	20 yd (18 m)	
EF0	NNW of Seibert	Kit Carson	CO	39.3935°N 102.9301°W	21:45–21:53	1 mi (1.6 km)	20 yd (18 m)	
EF0	N of Bethune	Kit Carson	CO	39.4035°N 102.47°W	21:49–21:53	0.5 mi (0.80 km)	10 yd (9.1 m)	
EF1	NNW of Seibert	Kit Carson	CO	39.3668°N 102.9158°W	21:57–22:22	2 mi (3.2 km)	50 yd (46 m)	
EF0	NNW of Seibert	Kit Carson	CO	39.3668°N 102.9158°W	21:57–22:13	1.5 mi (2.4 km)	50 yd (46 m)	
EF0	NW of Burlington	Kit Carson	CO	39.3613°N 102.3493°W	22:08–22:12	0.5 mi (0.80 km)	10 yd (9.1 m)	
EF0	W of Seibert	Kit Carson	CO	39.3°N 102.936°W	22:29–22:34	0.5 mi (0.80 km)	10 yd (9.1 m)	
EF0	WSW of Knoke	Calhoun	IA	42.51°N 94.79°W	02:05	0.1 mi (0.16 km)	30 yd (27 m)	
EF0	SW of Las Animas	Bent	CO	38.0189°N 103.2849°W	03:03–03:04	0.1 mi (0.16 km)	50 yd (46 m)	

=== July 5 event ===
List of confirmed tornadoes – Thursday, July 5, 2007
EF#	Location	County / Parish	State	Start Coord.	Time (UTC)	Path length	Max width	Summary
EF0	Galveston	Galveston	TX	29.2599°N 94.939°W	23:05–23:13	2 mi (3.2 km)	30 yd (27 m)	

=== July 6 event ===
List of confirmed tornadoes – Friday, July 6, 2007
EF#	Location	County / Parish	State	Start Coord.	Time (UTC)	Path length	Max width	Summary
EF0	Santa Fe	Galveston	TX	29.37°N 95.08°W	22:50–22:55	0.3 mi (0.48 km)	35 yd (32 m)	
EF0	Lutcher	St. James	LA	30.03°N 90.72°W	23:20–23:23	0.2 mi (0.32 km)	20 yd (18 m)	

=== July 7 event ===
List of confirmed tornadoes – Saturday, July 7, 2007
EF#	Location	County / Parish	State	Start Coord.	Time (UTC)	Path length	Max width	Summary
EF0	Southern Decatur	Newton	MS	32.4198°N 89.1079°W	15:08–15:09	0.8 mi (1.3 km)	30 yd (27 m)	
EF0	Port Orange	Volusia	FL	29.1434°N 81.9857°W	21:33–21:36	0.12 mi (0.19 km)	30 yd (27 m)	
EF0	Southwestern Corpus Christi	Nueces	TX	27.7295°N 97.4509°W	22:40–22:41	0.37 mi (0.60 km)	40 yd (37 m)	

=== July 9 event ===
List of confirmed tornadoes – Monday, July 9, 2007
EF#	Location	County / Parish	State	Start Coord.	Time (UTC)	Path length	Max width	Summary
EF0	NE of Standish	Arenac	MI	44.02°N 83.93°W	20:15–20:16	0.5 mi (0.80 km)	80 yd (73 m)	
EF1	E of Warner	Muskogee	OK	35.5°N 95.2467°W	21:15–21:17	0.25 mi (0.40 km)	50 yd (46 m)	
EF1	S of Roseglen	McLean	ND	47.5765°N 101.83°W	00:25–00:34	1.5 mi (2.4 km)	60 yd (55 m)	

=== July 10 event ===
List of confirmed tornadoes – Tuesday, July 10, 2007
EF#	Location	County / Parish	State	Start Coord.	Time (UTC)	Path length	Max width	Summary
EF0	SSW of Alden	Antrim	MI	44.8666°N 85.2778°W	23:15	0.1 mi (0.16 km)	40 yd (37 m)	

=== July 11 event ===
List of confirmed tornadoes – Wednesday, July 11, 2007
EF#	Location	County / Parish	State	Start Coord.	Time (UTC)	Path length	Max width	Summary
EF1	W of Coward	Florence	SC	33.97°N 79.8197°W	21:14–21:15	0.87 mi (1.40 km)	30 yd (27 m)	
EF1	WNW of Mary	Horry	SC	33.882°N 79.131°W	22:40–22:41	0.06 mi (0.097 km)	10 yd (9.1 m)	
EF1	Old Ford	Beaufort	NC	35.63°N 77.07°W	23:00–23:10	1 mi (1.6 km)	100 yd (91 m)	

=== July 12 event ===
List of confirmed tornadoes – Thursday, July 12, 2007
EF#	Location	County / Parish	State	Start Coord.	Time (UTC)	Path length	Max width	Summary
EF0	E of Ault	Weld	CO	40.58°N 104.701°W	21:43	0.1 mi (0.16 km)	50 yd (46 m)	
EF0	NW of Sutherland	Lincoln	NE	41.2211°N 101.1979°W	22:15	0.1 mi (0.16 km)	20 yd (18 m)	

=== July 13 event ===
List of confirmed tornadoes – Friday, July 13, 2007
EF#	Location	County / Parish	State	Start Coord.	Time (UTC)	Path length	Max width	Summary
EF0	S of Sutherland	Lincoln	NE	41.0688°N 101.13°W	00:18	0.1 mi (0.16 km)	20 yd (18 m)	

=== July 14 event ===
List of confirmed tornadoes – Saturday, July 14, 2007
EF#	Location	County / Parish	State	Start Coord.	Time (UTC)	Path length	Max width	Summary
EF0	Naval Station Mayport	Duval	FL	30.38°N 81.4242°W	17:56–17:58	0.75 mi (1.21 km)	50 yd (46 m)	
EF0	Elwood	Doniphan	KS	39.75°N 94.88°W	00:00–00:01	0.1 mi (0.16 km)	25 yd (23 m)	

=== July 15 event ===
List of confirmed tornadoes – Sunday, July 15, 2007
EF#	Location	County / Parish	State	Start Coord.	Time (UTC)	Path length	Max width	Summary
EF1	Northeastern San Antonio	Bexar	TX	29.5018°N 98.4061°W	07:30–07:35	0.5 mi (0.80 km)	50 yd (46 m)	
EF0	ENE of Rodanthe	Dare	NC	35.61°N 75.46°W	12:06	0.1 mi (0.16 km)	10 yd (9.1 m)	
EF0	NE of Guerette	Aroostook	ME	47.2016°N 68.2148°W	22:08–22:16	1 mi (1.6 km)	150 yd (140 m)	
EF2	NNW of Embden	Cass	ND	46.8401°N 97.4543°W	00:16–00:20	3 mi (4.8 km)	150 yd (140 m)	
EF1	SW of Chaffee to E of Sheldon	Cass, Ransom	ND	46.7289°N 97.4246°W	00:25–00:40	10 mi (16 km)	200 yd (180 m)	
EF2	SE of Sheldon to NNW of McLeod	Ransom	ND	46.5084°N 97.376°W	00:46–00:50	3 mi (4.8 km)	200 yd (180 m)	
EF1	Tower City	Cass, Barnes	ND	46.93°N 97.67°W	02:19–02:21	1.5 mi (2.4 km)	150 yd (140 m)	
EF2	E of Tower City to NNN of Alice	Cass	ND	46.93°N 97.6065°W	02:20–02:29	8 mi (13 km)	250 yd (230 m)	
EF1	N of Edgeley	LaMoure	ND	46.4857°N 98.7°W	03:30–03:35	1 mi (1.6 km)	80 yd (73 m)	
EF0	E of Cogswell	Sargent	ND	46.1°N 97.6758°W	03:37	0.2 mi (0.32 km)	25 yd (23 m)	
EF0	W of Winship	Brown	SD	45.92°N 98.64°W	04:18–04:20	0.1 mi (0.16 km)	10 yd (9.1 m)	

=== July 16 event ===
List of confirmed tornadoes – Monday, July 16, 2007
EF#	Location	County / Parish	State	Start Coord.	Time (UTC)	Path length	Max width	Summary
EF1	McAllen	Hidalgo	TX	26.2°N 98.23°W	13:00–13:30	1 mi (1.6 km)	50 yd (46 m)	
EF0	NE of Webster	Sumter	FL	28.6102°N 82.0384°W	21:06	0.2 mi (0.32 km)	30 yd (27 m)	
EF1	SE of Fallston	Harford	MD	39.5098°N 76.4068°W	22:15–22:27	4 mi (6.4 km)	150 yd (140 m)	
EF1	NE of Washington	Washington	IA	41.33°N 91.67°W	22:49	0.5 mi (0.80 km)	100 yd (91 m)	

=== July 17 event ===
List of confirmed tornadoes – Tuesday, July 17, 2007
EF#	Location	County / Parish	State	Start Coord.	Time (UTC)	Path length	Max width	Summary
EF0	S of Beautancus	Duplin	NC	35.0188°N 78.03°W	01:13	0.1 mi (0.16 km)	20 yd (18 m)	
EF0	NE of Beautancus	Duplin	NC	35.1507°N 77.9925°W	01:15	0.1 mi (0.16 km)	10 yd (9.1 m)	

=== July 18 event ===
List of confirmed tornadoes – Wednesday, July 18, 2007
EF#	Location	County / Parish	State	Start Coord.	Time (UTC)	Path length	Max width	Summary
EF1	Islip Terrace	Suffolk	NY	40.75°N 73.2°W	13:25–13:30	0.67 mi (1.08 km)	150 yd (140 m)	
EF1	W of Paris	Linn	IA	42.23°N 91.5995°W	00:15–00:17	1.2 mi (1.9 km)	100 yd (91 m)	
EF0	WNW of Pablo to Flathead Lake to Bigfork	Lake, Flathead	MT	47.6553°N 114.3182°W	01:50–03:30	9 mi (14 km)	50 yd (46 m)	

=== July 19 event ===
List of confirmed tornadoes – Thursday, July 19, 2007
EF#	Location	County / Parish	State	Start Coord.	Time (UTC)	Path length	Max width	Summary
EF0	New Braintree	Worcester	MA	42.32°N 72.13°W	21:00–21:02	1.5 mi (2.4 km)	50 yd (46 m)	

=== July 21 event ===
List of confirmed tornadoes – Saturday, July 21, 2007
EF#	Location	County / Parish	State	Start Coord.	Time (UTC)	Path length	Max width	Summary
EF2	S of Seguin	Guadalupe	TX	29.4399°N 97.97°W	10:25–10:29	2 mi (3.2 km)	150 yd (140 m)	
EF0	Cape Coral	Lee	FL	26.5796°N 81.9471°W	15:45–15:46	0.2 mi (0.32 km)	30 yd (27 m)	
EF0	W of The Hammocks	Miami-Dade	FL	25.68°N 80.55°W	19:20–19:25	0.5 mi (0.80 km)	40 yd (37 m)	

=== July 22 event ===
List of confirmed tornadoes – Sunday, July 22, 2007
EF#	Location	County / Parish	State	Start Coord.	Time (UTC)	Path length	Max width	Summary
EF0	Flagler Beach	Flagler	FL	29.47°N 81.13°W	16:52–16:54	0.6 mi (0.97 km)	50 yd (46 m)	

=== July 23 event ===
List of confirmed tornadoes – Monday, July 23, 2007
EF#	Location	County / Parish	State	Start Coord.	Time (UTC)	Path length	Max width	Summary
EF0	Port St. Lucie	St. Lucie	FL	27.27°N 80.3909°W	22:30	0.1 mi (0.16 km)	30 yd (27 m)	

=== July 24 event ===
List of confirmed tornadoes – Tuesday, July 24, 2007
EF#	Location	County / Parish	State	Start Coord.	Time (UTC)	Path length	Max width	Summary
EF0	Cedar Key	Levy	FL	29.129°N 83.0512°W	10:33–10:35	0.2 mi (0.32 km)	30 yd (27 m)	
EF0	E of North Port	Sarasota	FL	27°N 81.9094°W	18:20–18:21	0.2 mi (0.32 km)	30 yd (27 m)	
EF0	NNE of Ferndale	Lake	FL	28.6285°N 81.6952°W	23:20–23:30	1.03 mi (1.66 km)	30 yd (27 m)	

=== July 25 event ===
List of confirmed tornadoes – Wednesday, July 25, 2007
EF#	Location	County / Parish	State	Start Coord.	Time (UTC)	Path length	Max width	Summary
EF0	NNE of Taft	San Patricio	TX	28.0336°N 97.3662°W	14:53–14:55	0.53 mi (0.85 km)	50 yd (46 m)	
EF0	N of Masaryktown	Hernando	FL	28.4388°N 82.45°W	18:45–18:46	0.2 mi (0.32 km)	30 yd (27 m)	
EF0	E of Plymouth	Box Elder	UT	41.88°N 112.1399°W	19:00–19:01	0.25 mi (0.40 km)	100 yd (91 m)	

=== July 26 event ===
List of confirmed tornadoes – Thursday, July 26, 2007
EF#	Location	County / Parish	State	Start Coord.	Time (UTC)	Path length	Max width	Summary
EF0	S of Ellis	Steuben	IN	41.6083°N 84.92°W	00:16–00:17	0.01 mi (0.016 km)	50 yd (46 m)	
EF0	SW of Alvarado	Steuben	IN	41.5547°N 84.8505°W	00:43–00:44	0.01 mi (0.016 km)	50 yd (46 m)	
EF0	S of Alvarado	Steuben	IN	41.5555°N 84.83°W	00:52–00:56	0.02 mi (0.032 km)	50 yd (46 m)	

== See also ==
- Tornadoes of 2007
- List of United States tornadoes in May 2007
- List of United States tornadoes from August to September 2007
