= Lakonta, Iowa =

- Unincorporated community
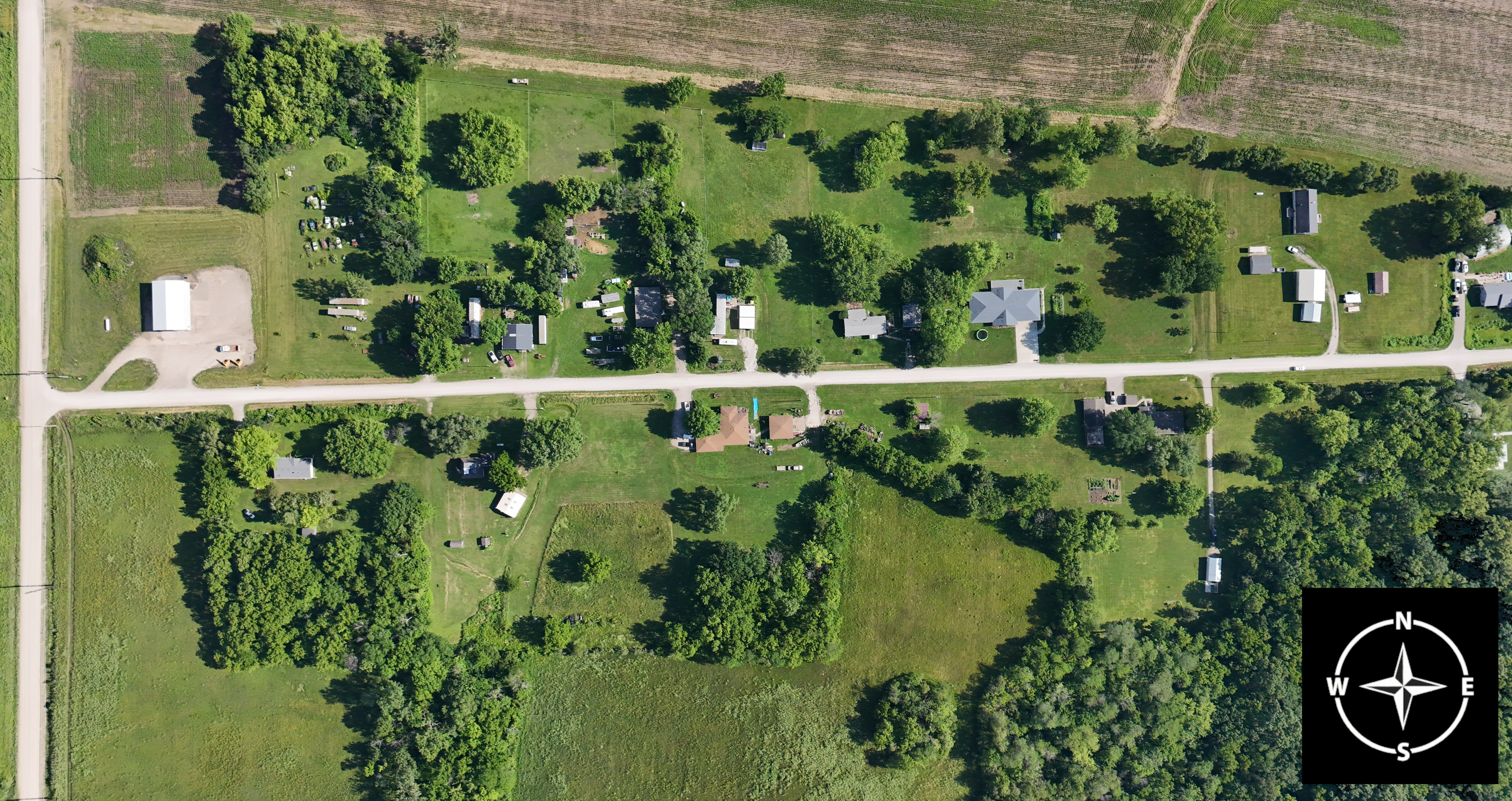
- An aerial view of Laconta, taken on June 28, 2025

- Location within Iowa Location within the United States
- Coordinates: 41°11′36″N 92°43′50″W
- Country: United States
- State: Iowa
- County: Mahaska
- Elevation: 728 ft (222 m)
- Time zone: UTC-6 (Central (CST))
  - Summer (DST): UTC-5 (CDT)
- Area code: 641
- GNIS feature ID: 464609

Lakonta is an unincorporated community in Mahaska County, in the U.S. state of Iowa.

== History ==
Lakonta was platted in 1900. The name Lakonta is of Native American origin meaning "blacksmith". A post office was established as Lakonta in 1900, renamed Truax in 1926, and the post office closed in 1934.

Lakonta's population was 21 in 1915.
