= List of United States tornadoes from January to April 2003 =

From February to April 2003, the local weather forecast offices of the National Weather Service confirmed 217 tornadoes in the United States. There were no tornadoes confirmed in the month of January, marking only the fifth time since accurate records began in 1950 that an entire calendar month went tornado-free.

== January ==
January had no tornadoes confirmed in the United States. It was only the fifth time since 1950 that an entire calendar month went tornado-free. The other months were; October 1952, December 1963, November 1976, and January 1986.

== February ==
There were 18 tornadoes confirmed in the US in February.

== March ==
There were 43 tornadoes confirmed in the US in March.

== April ==
There were 156 tornadoes reported in the US in April.

=== April 4–7 ===
FU	F0	F1	F2	F3	F4	F5
0	28	9	3	1	0	0

A tornado outbreak spawned 41 tornadoes from Idaho to Alabama. There were no fatalities, but 14 people were injured.

=== April 15 ===
FU	F0	F1	F2	F3	F4	F5
0	3	8	1	1	0	0

A small tornado outbreak struck Oklahoma and Texas, injuring one.

=== Confirmed tornadoes ===
Confirmed tornadoes by Fujita rating
FU	F0	F1	F2	F3	F4	F5	Total
0	18	3	0	0	0	0	21

Confirmed tornadoes – Wednesday, April 30, 2003
F#	Location	County	Time (CST)	Path length	Damage
Colorado
F0	E of Hudson	Weld	1600	0.1 miles (0.16 km)	Small tornado; no damage reported.
F0	SE of Prospect Valley	Weld	1621	0.1 miles (0.16 km)	No damage reported.
Iowa
F0	E of Lockman	Monroe, Wapello	1730	2.5 miles (4.0 km)	Short-lived, weak tornado. Little damage reported.
F0	NE of Morning Sun	Louisa	1735	16 miles (25.6 km)	Tornadic circulation was initially almost a half-mile wide. It then consolidated into a 50-yard wide funnel. There was some light damage to buildings in the area.
F0	NE of Highland Center	Wapello	1745	0.2 miles (0.32 km)	Brief touchdown in a field.
Illinois
F1	S of Aledo	Mercer	1742	unknown	Tornado damaged several farm buildings.
F0	SE of Aledo	Mercer	1757	0.8 miles (1.3 km)	Traveled through open country.
F1	S of Viola	Mercer	1808	0.1 miles (0.16 km)	A farmhouse was damaged.
F0	SE of Viola (1st tornado)	Mercer	1811	0.5 miles (0.8 km)	Tornado damaged a house.
F1	SE of Viola	Mercer	1812	0.5 miles (0.8 km)	A house was pushed six feet off its foundation.
F0	N of Alpha	Henry	1829	unknown	Brief touchdown in field.
F0	NE of Victoria	Knox	1930	1 miles (1.6 km)	No damage reported.
Missouri
F0	NE of Albany	Gentry, Harrison	1804	2 miles (3.2 km)	Tornado touched down in open country, causing no damage.
F0	NW of Weston	Platte	1815	1 miles (1.6 km)	Touchdown was noted near a ski resort.
F0	W of Ridgeway	Harrison	1822	10 miles (16.0 km)	Some damage to power lines and transformers was noted.
F0	W of Edgerton area	Platte	1835	0.2 mile (0.32 km)	Brief touchdown near Interstate 29.
F0	N of Lemons	Putnam	1955	2 miles (3.2 km)	Tornado spotted in open country; no damage reported.
F0	N of Greentop	Schuyler	2053	6 miles (9.6 km)	Up to a quarter mile wide tornado reported in open country.
Kansas
F0	E of Cambridge	Cowley	2117	2 miles (3.2 km)	Remained in open country.
F0	N of Cedar Vale	Chautauqua	2137	1 miles (1.6 km)	Remained in open country.
F0	NW of Sedan	Chautauqua	2158	0.5 miles (0.8 km)	Remained in open country.
Sources: NOAA Storm Data

== See also ==
- Tornadoes of 2003
