= Hot Coffee, Mississippi =

- Location of Covington County, Mississippi (in which Hot Coffee, MS is located)
- Coordinates: 31°44′23″N 89°26′46″W
- Country: United States
- State: Mississippi
- County: Covington
- Elevation: 272 ft (83 m)
- GNIS feature ID: 671513

Hot Coffee is a locale in Covington County, Mississippi, celebrated in local Mississippi lore. It is sometimes assigned the same zipcode as nearby Collins.

== History ==
The community was established at the crossroads of two popular travel routes: the north–south Jackson's Military Road, and the east–west Natchez to Fort St. Stephens Wagon Road. An inn was built, and in 1870, L.J. Davis built a store and hung a coffee pot over his door, advertising "the best hot coffee around". His coffee was made from spring water and New Orleans beans, and molasses drippings for sweetener. He never served cream with his coffee, believing it ruined the taste. Local politicians would visit Davis' store and buy coffee for constituents and passing travelers. The popularity of Davis' coffee led to the name of the community. Hot Coffee has frequently been noted on lists of unusual place names.

West of Hot Coffee was an Old Order German Baptist community, which contained "Martha's Kitchen", well known for its pies and homestyle cooking. In 2005, National Geographic published an article about Hot Coffee, describing it as:

A tiny community of farms, homes, and businesses scattered along two-lane Highway 532. The 12-mile stretch known locally as Hot Coffee Road runs from the town of Mount Olive to a crossroads that dates back to pioneer days.
