= List of United States tornadoes in June 2009 =

The National Weather Service confirmed 270 tornadoes in the United States in June 2009.

== United States yearly total ==
Confirmed tornadoes by Enhanced Fujita rating
| EFU | EF0 | EF1 | EF2 | EF3 | EF4 | EF5 | Total |
|---|---|---|---|---|---|---|---|
| 0 | 695 | 348 | 82 | 20 | 2 | 0 | 1159 |

== June ==
Confirmed tornadoes by Enhanced Fujita rating
| EFU | EF0 | EF1 | EF2 | EF3 | EF4 | EF5 | Total |
|---|---|---|---|---|---|---|---|
| 0 | 203 | 54 | 11 | 0 | 0 | 0 | 270 |

Note: 2 tornadoes were confirmed in the final totals, but do not have a listed rating.

=== June 1 event ===
List of reported tornadoes - Monday, June 1, 2009
| EF# | Location | County | Coord. | Time (UTC) | Path length | Damage |
|---|---|---|---|---|---|---|
Illinois
| EF0 | N of Buena Vista | Stephenson | 42.45°N 89.67°W | 21:30 | unknown | Brief tornado blew off a tin roof from a shed and damaged a barn and a grain bin. |
Wyoming
| EF1 | E of Manderson | Big Horn | 44.22°N 107.80°W | 21:58 | 0.5 miles (0.80 km) | A wooden corral, trees and fences were damaged and several small vehicles thrown. |
Kansas
| EF0 | SE of St. Francis | Cheyenne | 39.73°N 101.75°W | 02:24 | unknown | Brief tornado remained in open country. |
Nebraska
| EF0 | SSW of McCook | Red Willow | 40.06°N 100.68°W | 02:57 | 1 mile (1.6 km) | Brief tornado remained in open country. |
Sources: SPC Storm Reports for June 1, 2009, NWS Riverton, NCDC Storm Data

=== June 2 event ===
List of reported tornadoes - Tuesday, June 2, 2009
| EF# | Location | County/ Parish | Coord. | Time (UTC) | Path length | Damage |
|---|---|---|---|---|---|---|
Louisiana
| EF0 | SSE of Boston | Vermilion | 29.85°N 92.05°W | 19:15 | unknown | Tornado reported by KATC-TV that remained in marshland. |
Kansas
| EF0 | SW of Dodge City | Ford | 37.65°N 100.13°W | 19:39 | unknown | Brief touchdown in a plowed field. |
| EF0 | WSW of Windthrost | Ford | 37.73°N 99.70°W | 20:45 | 1 mile (1.6 km) | Brief touchdown with no damage. |
Ohio
| EF0 | SE of Amanda | Fairfield | 39.60°N 82.70°W | 21:36 | 50 yards (50 m) | Tornado remained in a wheat field with no damage to structures. |
Texas
| EF0 | W of Meadow | Terry | 33.31°N 102.25°W | 21:40 | unknown | Brief dusty landspout tornado reported by an off-duty NWS employee. |
| EF0 | W of Longworth | Fisher | 32.65°N 100.37°W | 21:43 | unknown | Brief tornado reported by storm chasers. |
Sources: SPC Storm Reports for June 2, 2009, NWS Wilmington, OH (PNS) NWS Dodge City, NCDC Storm Data

=== June 3 event ===
List of reported tornadoes - Wednesday, June 3, 2009
| EF# | Location | County | Coord. | Time (UTC) | Path length | Damage |
|---|---|---|---|---|---|---|
Alabama
| EF0 | W of Huntsville | Madison | 34.65°N 86.78°W | 17:48 | unknown | Brief landspout tornado near Huntsville International Airport with no damage. |
Texas
| EF0 | NNW of Bacliff | Harris | 29.57°N 95.02°W | 19:14 | unknown | Brief tornado in a parking lot damaged a few cars. |
| EF0 | NW of Rincon | Starr | 26.52°N 98.61°W | 00:30 | 1 mile (1.6 km) | Tornado remained in ranch lands with no damage. |
| EF0 | SW of San Patricio | San Patricio | 27.94°N 96.80°W | 02:22 | 0.5 miles (0.80 km) | Damage limited to a few trees. |
Virginia
| EF1 | Stanley | Page | 38.58°N 78.50°W | 22:45 | 1.67 miles (2.69 km) | A mobile home was overturned, a salt storage garage was heavily damaged and several other houses sustained minor damage. |
Wyoming
| EF0 | SW of Jeffrey City | Fremont | 42.28°N 107.99°W | 01:43 | 1 mile (1.6 km) | Tornado remained in open country. |
Sources: SPC Storm Reports for June 3, 2009, NWS Baltimore/Washington, NWS Houston/Galveston, NCDC Storm Data

=== June 4 event ===
List of reported tornadoes - Thursday, June 4, 2009
| EF# | Location | County | Coord. | Time (UTC) | Path length | Damage |
|---|---|---|---|---|---|---|
Florida
| EF0 | E of Tallahassee | Leon | 30.44°N 84.21°W | 15:10 | 100 yards (90 m) | Brief tornado heavily damaged the roof of Apalachee Elementary School. |
Georgia
| EF0 | W of Brunswick | Glynn | 31.14°N 81.57°W | 20:03 | 2 miles (3.2 km) | Several houses and a gas station were damaged at the junction of Interstate 95 and U.S. Route 17. |
| EF0 | E of Liberty Hill | Worth | 31.40°N 83.90°W | 00:50 | unknown | Three mobile homes were damaged by a brief tornado. |
Texas
| EF0 | S of Dalhart | Hartley | 35.97°N 102.52°W | 21:17 | 1 mile (1.6 km) | Tornado reported on the ground by law enforcement in open country. |
| EF0 | N of Vega | Oldham | 35.26°N 102.43°W | 23:08 | 1 mile (1.6 km) | Landspout tornado remained in open country. |
| EF0 | SW of Amarillo | Randall | 35.06°N 101.99°W | 23:33 | 200 yards (180 m) | Brief tornado reported by an amateur radio operator. |
| EF0 | W of Canyon | Randall | 34.98°N 102.05°W | 23:40 | 0.75 miles (1.21 km) | Tornado remained over open country. |
Oregon
| EF0 | N of Peoria | Linn | 44.48°N 123.20°W | 22:35 | 2 miles (3.2 km) | Tornado reported to the public by KVAL-TV. A small shed was damaged. |
Sources: SPC Storm Reports for June 4, 2009, NWS Amarillo, NCDC Storm Data, NWS Jacksonville, NWS Tallahassee, NWS Amarillo

=== June 5 event ===
List of reported tornadoes - Friday, June 5, 2009
| EF# | Location | County | Coord. | Time (UTC) | Path length | Damage |
|---|---|---|---|---|---|---|
Wyoming
| EF2 | W of La Grange | Goshen | 41.62°N 104.38°W | 22:07 | 8 miles (13 km) | Tornado spotted and tracked by the VORTEX2 project. Damage mostly to a few trees. By far the most studied tornado in history. Entire episode of Storm chasers based on the tornado. The SRV Dominator measured 155.2 mph in it. |
Nebraska
| EF0 | WSW of Harrisburg | Banner | 41.48°N 103.95°W | 23:49 | unknown | Brief tornado over open rangeland. |
| EF0 | N of Paxton | Keith | 41.20°N 101.37°W | 03:53 | unknown | Damage was reported to a shed and a fence. |
Texas
| EF0 | SE of White Deer | Carson | 35.35°N 101.11°W | 02:39 | 1 mile (1.6 km) | Tornado remained over open country. |
Sources: SPC Storm Reports for June 5, 2009, NWS Cheyenne, NCDC Storm Data

=== June 6 event ===
List of reported tornadoes - Saturday, June 6, 2009
| EF# | Location | County | Coord. | Time (UTC) | Path length | Damage |
|---|---|---|---|---|---|---|
Washington
| EF0 | S of Creston (1st tornado) | Lincoln | 47.71°N 118.55°W | 21:50 | unknown | First of four tornadoes in a 25 minute-span in the same area. No damage produced by any of the tornadoes |
| EF0 | S of Creston (2nd tornado) | Lincoln | 47.71°N 118.55°W | 21:55 | unknown | |
| EF0 | S of Creston (3rd tornado) | Lincoln | 47.71°N 118.55°W | 22:10 | unknown | |
| EF0 | S of Creston (4th tornado) | Lincoln | 47.71°N 118.55°W | 22:15 | unknown | |
Sources: SPC Storm Reports for June 6, 2009, NWS Spokane, NCDC Storm Data

=== June 7 event ===
List of reported tornadoes - Sunday, June 7, 2009
| EF# | Location | County | Coord. | Time (UTC) | Path length | Damage |
|---|---|---|---|---|---|---|
Wyoming
| EF0 | SE of La Grange | Goshen | 41.59°N 104.12°W | 19:03 | 3 miles (4.8 km) | Narrow landspout tornado remained over open country. |
Colorado
| EF0 | NNW of Northglenn | Adams | 39.99°N 105.00°W | 19:05 | 1 mile (1.6 km) | One house sustained minor roof damage. A few trees and fences were damaged. |
| EF1 | Aurora | Arapahoe | 39.63°N 104.75°W | 19:50 | 6 miles (9.7 km) | Tornado touched down in the southeast part of the city. Several residential subdivisions were impacted with mostly minor damage. Southlands Mall was also damaged, as was a Lowe's store in the area. Two people were injured. |
| EF0 | ENE of Buckley Field | Arapahoe | 39.73°N 104.62°W | 20:23 | unknown | Small tornado flipped a semi-trailer on Interstate 70. |
| EF1 | N of Kiowa | Elbert | 39.55°N 104.46°W | 20:27 | unknown | A house and several outbuildings were damaged. Flying debris also injured several horses. |
| EF0 | WNW of Lowland | Elbert | 39.53°N 104.03°W | 20:43 | unknown | Brief tornado touched down in an open field. |
Iowa
| EF0 | W of Anita | Cass | 41.41°N 94.48°W | 22:17 | unknown | Brief tornado touchdown with no damage. |
| EF0 | Adel area | Dallas | 41.64°N 93.96°W | 23:33 | 1.5 miles (2.4 km) | Tornado embedded in a larger microburst. Numerous trees were knocked down, some landing on a garage. |
Missouri
| EF0 | E of Amity | De Kalb | 39.87°N 94.42°W | 01:13 | unknown | A few tree branches were snapped by the brief tornado. |
| EF0 | SW of Weatherby | De Kalb | 39.90°N 94.25°W | 01:27 | unknown | Tornado remained in open fields. |
| EF0 | W of Kidder | Caldwell | 39.77°N 94.20°W | 03:44 | unknown | Tornado remained in open fields. |
Sources: SPC Storm Reports for June 7, 2009, NWS Denver, NWS Des Moines, NCDC Storm Data

=== June 8 event ===
List of reported tornadoes - Monday, June 8, 2009
| EF# | Location | County | Coord. | Time (UTC) | Path length | Damage |
|---|---|---|---|---|---|---|
Wisconsin
| EF0 | WSW of Mukwonago | Waukesha | 42.86°N 88.35°W | 20:38 | 3 miles (4.8 km) | Intermittent rain-wrapped tornado with little damage, mostly to trees. |
Illinois
| EF2 | O'Fallon area | St. Clair | 38.59°N 89.91°W | 22:20 | 12.8 miles (20.6 km) | One house was heavily damaged, and several others sustained minor to moderate damage. Tornado embedded in a larger microburst. |
| EF0 | N of DuQuoin | Perry | 38.09°N 89.24°W | 00:42 | 0.5 miles (0.80 km) | A small shed was overturned and a few trees were downed. |
| EF1 | SE of DuQuoin | Perry, Franklin | 38.00°N 89.18°W | 01:00 | 4.5 miles (7.2 km) | Hundreds of trees were damaged but no structures were affected. |
Sources: SPC Storm Reports for June 8, 2009, NWS Paducah, NWS St. Louis, NCDC Storm Data

=== June 9 event ===
List of reported tornadoes - Tuesday, June 9, 2009
| EF# | Location | County | Coord. | Time (UTC) | Path length | Damage |
|---|---|---|---|---|---|---|
Kansas
| EF0 | ENE of Moran | Allen | 37.92°N 95.15°W | 18:33 | 1 mile (1.6 km) | Tornado briefly touched down in an open field. |
| EF0 | ENE of Chanute | Neosho | 37.92°N 95.15°W | 19:25 | 2 miles (3.2 km) | Tornado remained over open country. |
| EF0 | N of Joy | Kiowa | 37.65°N 99.42°W | 23:53 | 1 mile (1.6 km) | Tornado witnessed by storm spotters over pasture country. |
Nebraska
| EF0 | Potter | Cheyenne | 41.21°N 103.32°W | 20:12 | unknown | Brief tornado touchdown. |
| EF0 | SW of Merritt Reservoir | Cheyenne | 42.15°N 101.66°W | 21:15 | unknown | Landspout tornado remained over open rangeland. |
Maryland
| EF0 | Dundalk area | Baltimore | 39.27°N 76.50°W | 21:21 | 1 mile (1.6 km) | Three townhouses and a car dealership were damaged. Tree damage was reported, some of which fell on houses. |
Colorado
| EF0 | SE of Liberty | Weld | 40.15°N 104.98°W | 23:11 | unknown | Tornado touched down but no damage. |
Missouri
| EF0 | SE of Thomasville | Oregon | 36.76°N 91.49°W | 00:59 | unknown | Touched down over an open field with little if any damage. |
Sources: SPC Storm Reports for June 9, 2009, NCDC Storm Data

=== June 10 event ===
List of reported tornadoes - Wednesday, June 10, 2009
| EF# | Location | County | Coord. | Time (UTC) | Path length | Damage |
|---|---|---|---|---|---|---|
Nebraska
| EF0 | NE of Haig | Scotts Bluff | 41.85°N 103.71°W | 18:59 | unknown | Brief tornado touchdown over open country. |
| EF0 | NW of Bayard | Morrill | 41.77°N 103.38°W | 20:38 | 4 miles (6.4 km) | A center pivot was turned by the tornado. |
Wyoming
| EF0 | W of Hawk Springs | Goshen | 41.77°N 104.50°W | 19:55 | unknown | Rope tornado sighted over rangeland. |
Colorado
| EF0 | Severance | Weld | 40.52°N 104.85°W | 20:30 | unknown | Brief tornado with no damage. |
| EF0 | NW of Roggen | Weld | 40.23°N 104.45°W | 22:05 | unknown | Brief tornado with no damage. |
Missouri
| EF0 | Harwood area | Vernon | 37.93°N 94.11°W | 22:41 | 1 mile (1.6 km) | Tornado confirmed by a trained spotter and damaged some trees. |
| EF1 | SSW of Iberia | Miller | 38.03°N 92.32°W | 01:05 | 1 mile (1.6 km) | Several trees, farm trailers and fences were damaged. |
Oklahoma
| EF0 | N of Enterprise | Haskell | 35.25°N 95.37°W | 23:00 | unknown | Brief tornado spotted over open country. |
| EF0 | Kinta | Haskell | 35.26°N 95.42°W | 23:11 | 0.4 miles (0.64 km) | A house, two barns and several trees were damaged. Tornado embedded in a larger microburst. |
Texas
| EF0 | Roanoke area | Denton | 33.00°N 97.23°W | 23:40 | 2 miles (3.2 km) | Brief touchdown reported by spotters with no reports of damage. |
| EF0 | NNE of Grapevine Reservoir | Denton | 33.05°N 97.12°W | 23:50 | unknown | Brief tornado reported by a retired NWS employee. |
| EF1 | Flower Mound area | Denton | 33.03°N 97.09°W | 23:53 | unknown | 16 houses sustained structural damage at an apartment complex, including one building which had a brick wall crumple. |
| EF0 | NNE of Camey | Denton | 33.05°N 96.90°W | 00:05 | 1 mile (1.6 km) | Tornado was videotaped by a storm chaser and remained in open fields. |
| EF0 | S of Detroit | Red River | 33.66°N 95.27°W | 02:22 | 2.5 miles (4.0 km) | Several trees and limbs were damaged. |
| EF0 | E of Talco | Titus | 33.36°N 95.10°W | 02:25 | 2.4 miles (3.9 km) | Damage to a few power lines and trees. |
| EF0 | SW of Linden | Cass | 32.93°N 94.32°W | 03:15 | 0.75 miles (1.21 km) | Damage to a few power lines and trees. |
Kansas
| EF0 | SSE of Satanta | Seward | 37.36°N 100.94°W | 01:28 | 0.26 miles (0.42 km) | Brief tornado touchdown in a grass field. |
Sources: SPC Storm Reports for June 10, 2009, NWS Springfield, NWS Shreveport, NWS Dallas-Fort Worth (PNS), NCDC Storm Data

=== June 11 event ===
List of reported tornadoes - Thursday, June 11, 2009
| EF# | Location | County | Coord. | Time (UTC) | Path length | Damage |
|---|---|---|---|---|---|---|
Kentucky
| EF0 | NE of Spottsville | Henderson, Daviess, Spencer (IN) | 37.77°N 87.11°W | 22:02 | 3.5 miles (5.6 km) | Tornado remained in open fields, with damage to some crops and a few trees. |
| EF0 | NE of Thurston | Daviess | 37.85°N 87.00°W | 22:36 | unknown | Brief tornado damaged a few tree limbs. |
| EF1 | S of Brownsville | Warren, Barren | 37.12°N 86.34°W | 00:00 | 18 miles (29 km) | Several areas of damage, including widespread and extensive tree damage, were noted along the long intermittent path. Two large barns were destroyed and a house was damaged. |
| EF1 | W of Cyclone | Metcalfe, Monroe | 36.84°N 85.67°W | 01:01 | 1.3 miles (2.1 km) | Two houses, a shed and tobacco farms were damaged along an intermittent path. |
Colorado
| EF0 | SW of Manzanola | Otero | 38.08°N 103.88°W | 00:03 | unknown | Brief tornado touchdown in open country. |
| EF0 | ESE of Sugar City | Crowley | 38.20°N 103.51°W | 00:35 | unknown | Brief tornado touchdown in open country. |
Sources: SPC Storm Reports for June 11, 2009, NWS Louisville, NWS Paducah, NCDC Storm Data

=== June 12 event ===
List of reported tornadoes - Friday, June 12, 2009
| EF# | Location | County | Coord. | Time (UTC) | Path length | Damage |
|---|---|---|---|---|---|---|
Arkansas
| EF1 | E of Possum Trot | Conway | 35.26°N 92.71°W | 19:10 | 2.44 miles (3.93 km) | Damage to a few roofs and many trees and power lines. Tornado embedded in a derecho that crossed during the mid-afternoon. |
Mississippi
| EF2 | Olive Branch | DeSoto | 34.94°N 89.84°W | 21:58 | 2.9 miles (4.7 km) | Four houses were destroyed and many other houses and public buildings, including four schools, were damaged with some of the damage due to fallen trees. One person was injured. |
Tennessee
| EF1 | Bartlett | Shelby | 35.22°N 89.84°W | 22:00 | 150 yards (140 m) | Several houses sustained minor roof damage and several trees were snapped. |
Texas
| EF1 | S of Jacksboro | Jack | 33.15°N 98.15°W | 22:29 | 2 miles (3.2 km) | Damage to outbuildings and roofs. |
| EF1 | W of Perrin | Jack | 33.05°N 98.10°W | 2250 | 3 miles (4.8 km) | Damage to outbuildings and roofs. |
| EF1 | ENE of Richland Springs | San Saba | 31.27°N 98.89°W | 23:10 | 1 mile (1.6 km) | Several trees were snapped or uprooted in the narrow tornado path. |
| EF0 | SW of Cool | Parker | 32.82°N 98.00°W | 23:10 | 2 miles (3.2 km) | Trees and buildings were damaged at the Clark Gardens Botanical Park. |
| EF1 | SE of Millsap | Parker | 32.65°N 97.90°W | 00:15 | 11 miles (18 km) | Damage to carports and trees. |
| EF0 | WSW of Cherokee (1st tornado) | San Saba | 30.90°N 98.98°W | 00:50 | 1 mile (1.6 km) | A few oak trees were snapped. |
| EF0 | WSW of Cherokee (2nd tornado) | San Saba | 30.77°N 99.07°W | 01:40 | 1 mile (1.6 km) | Several tree limbs were knocked off and trees were snapped. |
| EF1 | SE of Hedwigs Hill | Mason | 30.66°N 99.11°W | 02:38 | 1 mile (1.6 km) | One house lost a roof, and a porch and an outbuilding were destroyed. |
Oklahoma
| EF1 | Norman | Cleveland | 35.22°N 97.41°W | 03:30 | 2 miles (3.2 km) | Several houses sustained minor roof damage, and trees were damaged. |
Sources: SPC Storm Reports for June 12, 2009, NWS Memphis, NWS Norman, NWS Little Rock, NWS Dallas-Fort Worth (PNS), NCDC Storm Data

=== June 13 event ===
List of reported tornadoes - Saturday, June 13, 2009
| EF# | Location | County | Coord. | Time (UTC) | Path length | Damage |
|---|---|---|---|---|---|---|
Texas
| EF1 | NE of Aspermont | Stonewall | 33.18°N 100.21°W | 23:25 | 4 miles (6.4 km) | Two houses were damaged, farm buildings were destroyed and many power poles were blown down. |
| EF2 | W of Rule | Haskell | 33.19°N 99.94°W | 23:30 | 4 miles (6.4 km) | Four houses lost their roofs, and farm equipment and outbuildings were destroyed. |
| EF0 | SW of Silverton | Briscoe | 34.41°N 101.35°W | 2332 | unknown | Brief tornado spotted by storm chasers remained in open country. |
| EF0 | SE of Silverton | Briscoe | 34.41°N 101.35°W | 2351 | 1 mile (1.6 km) | Rope tornado remained in open country. |
| EF1 | SE of Sagerton | Haskell | 33.03°N 99.90°W | 0008 | unknown | Tornado confirmed by photographer with minor damage. |
| EF0 | NW of Stamford | Jones | 32.93°N 99.75°W | 0054 | unknown | Brief tornado with no damage. |
Colorado
| EF0 | SSW of Pritchett | Baca | 37.16°N 102.93°W | 0001 | 1 mile (1.6 km) | Brief tornado with no damage. |
| EF0 | NNE of Dodd | Morgan | 40.32°N 103.67°W | 0036 | unknown | Brief tornado with no damage. |
| EF0 | NE of Wiley | Prowers | 38.20°N 102.63°W | 0047 | 1 mile (1.6 km) | Brief tornado knocked down a weak tree. |
Sources: NWS San Angelo (PNS), Storm Reports for June 13, 2009, NCDC Storm Data

=== June 14 event ===
List of reported tornadoes - Sunday, June 14, 2009
| EF# | Location | County | Coord. | Time (UTC) | Path length | Damage |
|---|---|---|---|---|---|---|
Alabama
| EF1 | N of Moulton | Lawrence | 34.51°N 87.32°W | 1525 | 1 mile (1.6 km) | A shed and a chicken house were destroyed with additional damage to a barn, one house and numerous hardwood and oak trees. |
Wyoming
| EF0 | NE of Chugwater | Platte | 41.80°N 104.75°W | 1927 | 6 miles (9.7 km) | Rope tornado tracked across open country. |
| EF0 | NW of Thermopolis | Hot Springs | 43.71°N 108.45°W | 2053 | 1 mile (1.6 km) | Brief tornado reported by several people. |
Kansas
| EF0 | NW of Satanta | Haskell | 37.55°N 101.01°W | 2223 | 3 miles (4.8 km) | A shed sustained minor damage. |
| EF1 | N of Tice | Haskell | 37.52°N 101.73°W | 2247 | 4 miles (6.4 km) | A grain elevator was damaged, along with several pieces of farm equipment. |
| EF1 | WSW of Tice | Haskell | 37.51°N 101.72°W | 2250 | 1 mile (1.6 km) | A metal shed and some power poles were damaged. |
| EF1 | NE of Wilmore | Comanche | 37.35°N 99.21°W | 0103 | 4 miles (6.4 km) | A metal shed and some power poles were damaged. |
| EF0 | NE of Silverdale | Cowley | 37.05°N 96.84°W | 0649 | 3 miles (4.8 km) | A house and a barn sustained roof damage. A horse trailer was also damaged. |
Kentucky
| EF1 | NW of Relief | Morgan | 37.96°N 83.01°W | 2245 | 1.5 miles (2.4 km) | Damage to dozens of trees. |
Sources: Storm Reports for June 14, 2009, NWS Huntsville (PNS), NCDC Storm Data

=== June 15 event ===
List of reported tornadoes - Monday, June 15, 2009
| EF# | Location | County | Coord. | Time (UTC) | Path length | Damage |
|---|---|---|---|---|---|---|
Colorado
| EF2 | W of Elbert | Elbert | 39.22°N 104.63°W | 1935 | 4 miles (6.4 km) | A barn was flattened and several houses and power poles were damaged. First of three tornadoes in the area. |
| EF0 | S of Elbert | Elbert | 39.15°N 104.54°W | 2004 | 0.3 miles (0.48 km) | An airplane hangar was damaged and an airplane flipped by this second tornado. |
| EF0 | SE of Elbert | Elbert | 39.13°N 104.50°W | 2010 | 0.6 miles (0.97 km) | No damage by the third tornado in the area. |
Kansas
| EF0 | NE of Dodge City | Ford | 37.85°N 99.97°W | 2127 | 1 mile (1.6 km) | Brief tornado with no damage. |
| EF0 | E of Ardell | Edwards | 37.88°N 99.48°W | 2225 | 3 miles (4.8 km) | Dusty tornado with minor damage to a barn. |
| EF1 | SE of Dodge City (1st tornado) | Ford | 37.70°N 99.97°W | 2226 | unknown | A pivot sprinkler was overturned. |
| EF1 | SE of Dodge City (2nd tornado) | Ford | 37.69°N 99.96°W | 2227 | 1.5 miles (2.4 km) | Tornado developed after the previous one dissipated. Two pivot sprinklers were hit and a shed was destroyed. |
| EF0 | NW of Williams | Edwards | 37.88°N 99.48°W | 2237 | 4 miles (6.4 km) | Several trees and power lines were blown down. |
| EF1 | NE of Hodges | Edwards | 37.83°N 99.36°W | 2240 | 3 miles (4.8 km) | Two large grain bins were destroyed - one rolling nearly a mile (1.6 km) - and one larger one was damaged. Four pivot sprinklers were also damaged. |
| EF1 | SW of Belpre | Edwards | 37.88°N 99.14°W | 2256 | 3 miles (4.8 km) | A grain bin and an oil tank were destroyed and moved. |
| EF2 | SE of Belpre | Edwards, Stafford | 37.90°N 99.02°W | 2303 | 12 miles (19 km) | Large multiple-vortex tornado heavily damaged a trailer, trees, power poles and farm equipment with the heaviest damage to trees. |
| EF0 | SW of El Dorado (1st tornado) | Butler | 37.77°N 96.90°W | 2345 | 1 mile (1.6 km) | Brief tornado touchdown in an open field. |
| EF0 | SW of El Dorado (2nd tornado) | Butler | 37.80°N 96.89°W | 2347 | 1 mile (1.6 km) | Tornado remained in open country, lifting just before hitting an oil refinery. |
| EF0 | SE of El Dorado (1st tornado) | Butler | 37.80°N 96.89°W | 2350 | 1 mile (1.6 km) | Brief rope tornado reported on the ground. |
| EF0 | SW of Rosalia (1st tornado) | Butler | 37.77°N 96.70°W | 2355 | 1 mile (1.6 km) | Brief rope tornado reported on the ground. |
| EF0 | SE of El Dorado (2nd tornado) | Butler | 37.79°N 96.77°W | 2358 | 1 mile (1.6 km) | Brief tornado touchdown in an open field. |
| EF0 | SE of El Dorado (3rd tornado) | Butler | 37.80°N 96.76°W | 0001 | 1 mile (1.6 km) | Brief tornado touchdown in an open field. |
| EF0 | SW of Rosalia (2nd tornado) | Butler | 37.79°N 96.65°W | 0004 | 1 mile (1.6 km) | Brief tornado touchdown in an open field. |
| EF0 | SW of Rosalia (3rd tornado) | Butler | 37.80°N 96.63°W | 0008 | 1 mile (1.6 km) | Brief rope tornado reported on the ground. |
| EF0 | N of Plevna | Reno | 38.07°N 98.29°W | 0017 | unknown | Brief tornado touchdown in an open field. |
| EF0 | WNW of Cedar Point | Chase | 38.29°N 96.84°W | 0020 | 1 mile (1.6 km) | Tornado remained in open country with no damage. |
| EF1 | NE of Dillwyn | Stafford | 37.97°N 98.81°W | 0037 | 2 miles (3.2 km) | Several pivot sprinklers and trees were damaged. |
| EF0 | NE of Hamilton | Greenwood | 38.02°N 96.11°W | 0140 | 1 mile (1.6 km) | Brief tornado touchdown in an open field. |
Nebraska
| EF0 | WSW of Sutherland | Lincoln | 41.15°N 101.20°W | 2132 | unknown | Brief tornado spotted by motorists on Interstate 80 in an open field. |
| EF0 | N of Roseland | Adams | 40.50°N 98.56°W | 0118 | 0.5 miles (0.80 km) | Center pivots were overturned while there was crop, tree and outbuilding damage with one home sustaining a broken window. |
| EF0 | S of Shelton | Buffalo | 40.73°N 98.72°W | 0137 | unknown | Brief tornado touchdown reported. |
Texas
| EF0 | SE of Perryton | Ochiltree | 36.16°N 100.65°W | 2323 | 0.25 miles (0.40 km) | Brief tornado spotted near Wolf Creek Park. |
South Dakota
| EF0 | W of Hayes | Stanley | 44.37°N 101.08°W | 0305 | 1 mile (1.6 km) | First of three brief tornadoes reported by spotters in the Hayes area. No damage from any of the three tornadoes. |
| EF0 | E of Hayes (1st tornado) | Stanley | 44.37°N 100.98°W | 0320 | unknown | Remained over open country with no damage |
| EF0 | E of Hayes (2nd tornado) | Stanley | 44.37°N 100.88°W | 0330 | 1 mile (1.6 km) | Remained over open country with no damage |
Sources:NWS Hastings, NWS Dodge City, NWS Denver, Storm Reports for June 15, 2009, NCDC Storm Data

=== June 16 event ===
List of reported tornadoes - Tuesday, June 16, 2009
| EF# | Location | County | Coord. | Time (UTC) | Path length | Damage |
|---|---|---|---|---|---|---|
Missouri
| EF1 | NE of Stockton | Cedar | 37.73°N 93.81°W | 1040 | 6 miles (9.7 km) | One mobile home had significant damage from a falling tree. Five homes, six metal outbuildings and three businesses had minor damage to roof and siding. |
South Dakota
| EF0 | WNW of Lebanon (1st tornado) | Potter | 45.08°N 99.84°W | 1700 | unknown | Brief tornado with no damage. |
| EF0 | WNW of Lebanon (2nd tornado) | Potter | 45.08°N 99.83°W | 1835 | 1 mile (1.6 km) | Brief tornado with no damage. |
| EF0 | ENE of Lowry | Walworth | 45.37°N 99.85°W | 1902 | unknown | Brief tornado touchdown in an open field with no damage. |
| EF0 | SE of Polo | Hand | 44.68°N 98.98°W | 1909 | 1 mile (1.6 km) | Brief tornado touchdown in an open field with no damage. |
| EF0 | E of Danforth | Hand | 44.28°N 98.79°W | 2055 | 4 miles (6.4 km) | Tornado tracked across open country for 15 minutes. |
| EF0 | SW of Mount Vernon | Davison | 43.62°N 98.25°W | 2231 | unknown | Brief tornado with no damage. |
| EF0 | NW of Dimock | Hutchinson | 43.47°N 97.99°W | 2336 | unknown | Brief tornado with no damage. |
| EF0 | NW of New Elms Springs Colony | Hutchinson | 43.47°N 97.87°W | 2350 | unknown | Brief tornado with no damage. |
| EF0 | NNW of Olivet | Hutchinson | 43.29°N 97.72°W | 0020 | unknown | Brief tornado with no damage. |
| EF1 | N of Menno | Hutchinson | 43.26°N 97.57°W | 0027 | 2 miles (3.2 km) | Several farm buildings were damaged, along with many trees. |
| EF0 | NW of Mission Hill | Yankton | 42.92°N 97.28°W | 0128 | unknown | Brief tornado with no damage. |
Kentucky
| EF1 | SW of Suwanee | Lyon | 37.04°N 88.20°W | 1728 | 0.375 miles (0.604 km) | Three farm barns/outbuildings were destroyed with hay bales being tossed. Trees were damaged, a power pole was pushed over and metal debris were thrown into trees |
| EF1 | NW of Tollesboro | Lewis | 38.57°N 83.57°W | 0125 | 0.25 miles (0.40 km) | A barn was destroyed with another damaged. Three mobile homes were lifted off their foundation. Minor structural damage to homes and mobile homes. |
North Dakota
| EF0 | SW of Fort Yates | Sioux | 46.03°N 100.70°W | 1800 | unknown | Brief tornado remained in open country. |
| EF0 | WNW of Dodge | Dunn | 47.30°N 102.25°W | 2000 | unknown | Brief tornado remained in open country. |
North Carolina
| EF0 | Fallston | Cleveland | 35.40°N 81.47°W | 2142 | 1 mile (1.6 km) | A machine shed was destroyed with roof, window and siding damage to homes. |
| EF1 | N of Stoney Point | Cleveland | 35.31°N 81.41°W | 2200 | 9 miles (14 km) | Mobile homes were shifted from their foundation. A few homes had minor damage to roofs. |
South Carolina
| EF1 | NW of York | York | 35.03°N 81.31°W | 2230 | 1.5 miles (2.4 km) | A concrete structure partially collapsed with roof damage. |
Virginia
| EF0 | Jonesville | Lee | 36.67°N 83.10°W | 2240 | 0.1 miles (0.16 km) | Brief tornado in town damaged a few trees. |
| EF0 | S of Castlewood | Russell | 36.80°N 82.30°W | 2355 | 0.2 miles (0.32 km) | A few trees were damaged. |
| EF0 | SE of Abingdon | Washington | 37.18°N 81.91°W | 0035 | 0.1 miles (0.16 km) | A few trees were damaged. |
Kansas
| EF0 | NNE of Geuda Springs | Sumner | 37.18°N 97.11°W | 0225 | 1 mile (1.6 km) | Brief tornado in an open field with no damage. |
Sources: NWS Wilmington, OH, Storm Reports for June 16, 2009, NWS Greenville-Spartanburg, NWS Knoxville (PNS), NWS Springfield, MO (PNS), NWS Paducah (PNS), NCDC Storm Data

=== June 17 event ===
List of reported tornadoes - Wednesday, June 17, 2009
| EF# | Location | County | Coord. | Time (UTC) | Path length | Damage |
|---|---|---|---|---|---|---|
Kansas
| EF1 | N of Hanover | Washington | 39.97°N 96.86°W | 1920 | 8 miles (13 km) | Two power poles were snapped and damage to several tree branches. |
| EF0 | WNW of Hull | Marshall | 39.90°N 96.72°W | 1935 | 1 mile (1.6 km) | Brief tornado with no damage. |
| EF0 | N of Beattie | Marshall | 39.92°N 96.42°W | 1955 | unknown | Brief tornado with no damage. |
Nebraska
| EF0 | SW of Odell | Gage | 40.01°N 96.80°W | 1918 | unknown | Brief multiple-vortex tornado with no damage. |
| EF1 | N of Gibbon (1st tornado) | Buffalo | 40.87°N 98.88°W | 2354 | 1.5 miles (2.4 km) | Damage at two farmsteads including windows, shingles, walls, grain bins, outbuildings and quonsets. |
| EF0 | N of Gibbon (2nd tornado) | Buffalo | 40.86°N 98.87°W | 0005 | unknown | Brief tornado with minor tree and crop damage. |
| EF0 | N of Gibbon (3rd tornado) | Buffalo | 40.85°N 98.80°W | 0010 | 4 miles (6.4 km) | Tornado remained in open country. |
| EF0 | SW of Mason City | Custer | 41.05°N 99.50°W | 0050 | unknown | Brief tornado with no damage. |
| EF0 | SW of Grand Island | Hall | 40.87°N 98.38°W | 0138 | 1.5 miles (2.4 km) | Three houses sustained shingle damage. Several trees were also knocked over. |
| EF0 | SSW of Phillips | Hamilton | 40.85°N 98.24°W | 0150 | 1 mile (1.6 km) | Brief tornado with no damage. |
| EF2 | W of Aurora | Hamilton | 40.86°N 98.16°W | 0159 | 5 miles (8.0 km) | A house and several outbuildings were destroyed and 12 railcars were overturned. Extensive tree and power pole damage. A pet food plant was badly damaged. |
Minnesota
| EF0 | SSW of Doran | Wilkin | 46.15°N 96.49°W | 2140 | unknown | Brief tornado touched down in an open field. |
| EF0 | SE of Tenney | Wilkin | 46.03°N 96.38°W | 2208 | 1 mile (1.6 km) | Brief tornado touched down in an open field. |
| EF0 | Geneva area | Freeborn | 43.85°N 93.28°W | 0030 | 2 miles (3.2 km) | Several trees and two sheds were damaged. |
| EF2 | Austin area | Mower | 43.72°N 93.00°W | 0100 | 10 miles (16 km) | Extensive damage in the community, with the worst damage to several metal industrial buildings which were destroyed. Minor roof damage was reported at a few houses. Many trees, sheds and outbuildings were damaged or destroyed. One person was injured. |
| EF0 | E of Waseca | Waseca | 44.08°N 93.46°W | 0102 | 2 miles (3.2 km) | Tornado formed as a waterspout on Clear Lake. Several trees were knocked down. |
| EF0 | Adams | Mower | 43.57°N 92.71°W | 0151 | unknown | Brief tornado spotted by a fire department with minimal damage. |
Ohio
| EF0 | W of Smithville | Wayne | 40.86°N 81.88°W | 2327 | 4 miles (6.4 km) | A garden shed was destroyed and dozens of trees were snapped. |
Kentucky
| EF0 | W of Hernan | Todd | 36.72°N 87.16°W | 0025 | unknown | Brief tornado damaged a few trees. |
Sources: NWS Hastings # 1, NWS Hastings # 2, NWS Hastings # 3, NWS La Crosse, NWS Topeka, NWS Twin Cities - 2009 tornadoes, Storm Reports for June 17, 2009, NCDC Storm Data

=== June 18 event ===
List of reported tornadoes - Thursday, June 18, 2009
| EF# | Location | County | Coord. | Time (UTC) | Path length | Damage |
|---|---|---|---|---|---|---|
North Dakota
| EF1 | Mooreton area | Richland | 46.28°N 96.87°W | 2304 | 7 miles (11 km) | A baseball diamond sustained damage, mainly to its bleachers which were thrown. |
Minnesota
| EF0 | N of Carlisle | Otter Tail | 46.38°N 96.18°W | 2350 | 3 miles (4.8 km) | |
| EF1 | Dent | Otter Tail | 46.55°N 95.71°W | 0015 | 3 miles (4.8 km) | Several large trees were damaged in a park area. |
South Dakota
| EF0 | WNW of Nunda | Richland | 44.18°N 97.12°W | 2304 | unknown | Brief tornado with no damage. |
Wisconsin
| EF0 | ENE of Highland | Iowa | 43.07°N 90.29°W | 0427 | 0.2 miles (0.32 km) | Damage limited to a few trees. |
Sources: SPC Storm Reports for June 18, 2009, NWS Milwaukee, NCDC Storm Data

=== June 19 event ===
List of reported tornadoes - Friday, June 19, 2009
| EF# | Location | County | Coord. | Time (UTC) | Path length | Damage |
|---|---|---|---|---|---|---|
Wisconsin
| EF0 | WNW of Kenosha | Kenosha | 42.54°N 87.94°W | 2242 | 1 mile (1.6 km) | Damage limited to a few trees. |
Illinois
| EF0 | ESE of Fairmont | Vermilion | 40.03°N 87.77°W | 2250 | unknown | Brief touchdown in a field with no damage. |
| EF0 | W of Westville | Vermilion | 40.05°N 87.65°W | 2309 | unknown | Brief touchdown in a field with no damage. |
| EF1 | Woodstock area | McHenry | 42.31°N 88.44°W | 0110 | 0.75 miles (1.21 km) | A garage was turned off and lifted from its foundation. Two buildings were damaged and numerous trees were damaged. |
Michigan
| EF2 | E of Pullman | Allegan | 42.47°N 86.01°W | 0138 | 5.7 miles (9.2 km) | One house was destroyed from falling trees while another house had a collapsed wall and roof damage, and several other houses were damaged. One pole barn was destroyed with another barn being moved off cinder blocks. A metal building was also blown down. |
| EF1 | NW of Alamo | Kalamazoo | 42.42°N 85.76°W | 0153 | 1.75 miles (2.82 km) | One outbuilding and numerous trees were destroyed, and a house sustained minor damage. |
| EF2 | WNW of Richland | Kalamazoo | 42.39°N 85.50°W | 0208 | 1.25 miles (2.01 km) | A roof and a deck were completed torn off a house. Many trees were knocked down. |
Sources: SPC Storm Reports for June 19, 2009, NWS Milwaukee, NWS Chicago, NWS Grand Rapids, NWS Lincoln, IL, NCDC Storm Data

=== June 20 event ===
List of reported tornadoes - Saturday, June 20, 2009
| EF# | Location | County | Coord. | Time (UTC) | Path length | Damage |
|---|---|---|---|---|---|---|
Maryland
| EF0 | Pleasant Hills area | Harford | 39.49°N 76.40°W | 1931 | 1 mile (1.6 km) | Several trees fell including one that fell onto a delivery truck. |
| EF1 | ESE of Essex | Baltimore | 39.30°N 76.43°W | 1944 | 5 miles (8.0 km) | Two trees fell into houses, damaging them. Dozens of trees snapped or uprooted. |
Nevada
| EF0 | S of Wildhorse | Elko | 41.59°N 115.79°W | 2140 | unknown | Brief tornado touchdown with no damage. |
| EF0 | N of Wildhorse | Elko | 41.71°N 115.79°W | 2200 | unknown | Brief tornado touchdown with no damage. |
Kansas
| EF0 | N of Mullinville | Kiowa | 37.69°N 99.50°W | 2240 | 1 mile (1.6 km) | Brief tornado remained over pasture land. |
| EF0 | WSW of Waverly | Coffey | 38.39°N 95.63°W | 2310 | 1 mile (1.6 km) | Brief tornado over an open field. |
| EF1 | Zook area | Pawnee | 38.01°N 99.09°W | 2317 | 5.1 miles (8.2 km) | Several outbuildings were destroyed. |
| EF0 | SW of Princeton | Franklin | 38.47°N 95.28°W | 0011 | unknown | Brief tornado over an open field. |
| EF0 | NE of Shields | Lane | 38.62°N 100.43°W | 0022 | 4 miles (6.4 km) | Tornado made intermittent ground contact but did no damage. |
| EF0 | W of Great Bend | Barton | 38.35°N 98.79°W | 0044 | 1 mile (1.6 km) | Portions of houses were damaged, including roofs, doors and windows. Some tree and power pole damage also took place. Two people were injured. |
| EF1 | W of McPherson (1st tornado) | McPherson | 38.35°N 97.85°W | 0055 | 1 mile (1.6 km) | A barn, a tractor trailer and two grain bins were destroyed. |
| EF0 | W of McPherson (2nd tornado) | McPherson | 38.36°N 97.76°W | 0105 | 5 miles (8.0 km) | Three barns, a silo and a center pivot were destroyed. Power poles were also downed. |
| EF0 | W of Durham | Marion | 38.49°N 97.34°W | 0145 | 0.75 miles (1.21 km) | Minor tree and barn damage. |
| EF0 | NE of Westfall | Lincoln | 38.92°N 97.99°W | 0210 | 1 mile (1.6 km) | Brief tornado reported by KWCH-DT. |
| EF0 | NE of Beverly | Lincoln | 39.03°N 97.94°W | 0212 | unknown | Brief tornado in an open field. |
Sources: SPC Storm Reports for June 20, 2009, NWS Topeka, NWS Wichita, NCDC Storm Data

=== June 21 event ===
List of reported tornadoes - Sunday, June 21, 2009
| EF# | Location | County | Coord. | Time (UTC) | Path length | Damage |
|---|---|---|---|---|---|---|
Idaho
| EF0 | SW of Riddle | Owyhee | 42.00°N 116.13°W | 1750 | unknown | Brief tornado picked up dust and sagebrush. |
Iowa
| EF0 | SW of Kamrar | Hamilton | 42.38°N 93.75°W | 2148 | 1 mile (1.6 km) | Tornado reported by spotters with a debris cloud. |
| EF0 | SE of Doon | Lyon | 43.26°N 96.19°W | 2229 | unknown | Brief tornado with no damage. |
| EF0 | E of Williams | Hamilton | 42.47°N 93.51°W | 2236 | 1 mile (1.6 km) | Brief tornado with no damage. |
| EF0 | W of Eagle City | Hardin | 42.47°N 93.18°W | 2315 | 1 mile (1.6 km) | Brief tornado with no damage. |
| EF0 | NW of Abbott | Hardin | 42.49°N 93.08°W | 2339 | unknown | Brief tornado with no damage. |
| EF0 | WNW of Wellsburg | Grundy | 42.45°N 92.97°W | 2351 | unknown | Brief tornado with no damage. |
| EF0 | ENE of Steamboat Rock | Hardin | 42.42°N 93.04°W | 2359 | 1 mile (1.6 km) | Brief tornado with a small debris cloud but no damage. |
| EF1 | W of Dike | Grundy | 42.46°N 92.63°W | 0048 | 2 miles (3.2 km) | The roof was torn off of a hog confinement building. |
| EF1 | SE of Wellsburg | Grundy | 42.40°N 92.86°W | 2351 | 2 miles (3.2 km) | A corrugated steel building was destroyed. |
Minnesota
| EF0 | NE of Easton | Faribault | 43.79°N 93.90°W | 0036 | 0.5 miles (0.80 km) | A garage and some trees were damaged. |
| EF0 | W of Walters | Faribault | 43.60°N 93.70°W | 0108 | 0.5 miles (0.80 km) | Tornado tracked through corn fields, damaging two grain bins. |
| EF0 | NE of Walters | Faribault | 43.61°N 93.65°W | 0118 | 0.5 miles (0.80 km) | Brief tornado remained in open fields. |
| EF0 | W of Alden | Freeborn | 43.65°N 93.62°W | 0132 | 2 miles (3.2 km) | Several trees were knocked down and a garden bench was thrown. |
Sources: SPC Storm Reports for June 21, 2009, NWS Des Moines, NWS Twin Cities - 2009 tornadoes, NCDC Storm Data

=== June 22 event ===
List of reported tornadoes - Monday, June 22, 2009
| EF# | Location | County | Coord. | Time (UTC) | Path length | Damage |
|---|---|---|---|---|---|---|
Colorado
| EF0 | W of Pierce | Weld | 40.62°N 104.81°W | 0347 | unknown | Brief small tornado with no damage. |
| EF0 | SW of Nunn | Weld | 40.67°N 104.80°W | 0410 | unknown | Brief small tornado with no damage. |
Sources: NCDC Storm Data

=== June 23 event ===
List of reported tornadoes - Tuesday, June 23, 2009
| EF# | Location | County | Coord. | Time (UTC) | Path length | Damage |
|---|---|---|---|---|---|---|
Florida
| EF0 | SE of Inverness | Citrus | 28.78°N 82.30°W | 2045 | unknown | Tornado touched down in a mobile home park, damaging about 50 mobile houses. About 50 trees were also damaged. |
| EF1 | E of Fruitville | Sarasota | 27.33°N 82.38°W | 0425 | 0.66 miles (1.06 km) | Damage at a plant farm includes two metal beams from a metal outbuilding that was torn off the foundation and heavily damaged or destroyed a dozen of greenhouses. |
Colorado
| EF0 | E of Matheson | Elbert | 39.16°N 103.89°W | 2258 | unknown | Brief small tornado with no damage. |
| EF0 | SSW of Fleming | Elbert | 40.60°N 102.87°W | 0207 | unknown | Brief tornado with no damage. |
Nebraska
| EF0 | NNW of Stapleton | Logan | 41.59°N 100.58°W | 0007 | 3 miles (4.8 km) | Tornado over open rangeland with no damage. |
| EF0 | SSW of Arnold | Custer | 41.35°N 100.23°W | 0154 | unknown | Brief tornado remained over open country. |
Wisconsin
| EF0 | NW of Milton | Rock | 42.80°N 88.97°W | 0109 | 1.7 miles (2.7 km) | Minor tree and power line damage with a porch being flipped over at a mobile home. |
Sources: NWS Milwaukee (PNS), NWS Tampa Bay, Storm Reports for June 23, 2009, NWS North Platte, NCDC Storm Data

=== June 24 event ===
List of reported tornadoes - Wednesday, June 24, 2009
| EF# | Location | County | Coord. | Time (UTC) | Path length | Damage |
|---|---|---|---|---|---|---|
North Dakota
| EF1 | S of Belfield | Stark | 46.80°N 103.19°W | 2328 | 7 miles (11 km) | Significant damage took place on a farm, severely damaging four farm buildings and destroying vehicles and fences, although the house only sustained minor damage. Several farm animals were also killed. |
| EF0 | S of Schefield | Stark, Hettinger | 46.65°N 102.90°W | 0003 | 18 miles (29 km) | Numerous buildings on several farms sustained window and roof damage, and some trees were damaged by the long track tornado. |
South Dakota
| EF0 | S of Virgil | Beadle | 44.27°N 98.43°W | 0107 | unknown | Brief tornado with no damage. |
| EF0 | S of Andover | Day | 45.35°N 97.97°W | 0150 | unknown | Brief tornado with no damage. |
| EF0 | S of Artesian | Sanborn | 43.96°N 97.92°W | 0200 | unknown | Brief tornado with damage to a few trees. |
| EF0 | N of Fulton | Hanson | 43.77°N 97.82°W | 0241 | unknown | Brief tornado with no damage. |
| EF0 | E of Fulton | Hanson | 43.72°N 97.75°W | 0242 | unknown | Second brief tornado in the area, also with no damage. |
| EF0 | N of Bridgewater | McCook | 43.55°N 97.50°W | 0326 | unknown | Brief tornado with no damage. |
| EF0 | S of Marion | Turner | 43.36°N 97.25°W | 0404 | unknown | Brief tornado with no damage. |
| EF0 | Viborg | Turner | 43.16°N 97.07°W | 0439 | unknown | Brief tornado with no damage. |
| EF0 | SSW of Harrison | Douglas | 43.38°N 98.55°W | 0527 | unknown | Brief tornado with no damage. |
Nebraska
| EF2 | N of Newport | Rock | 42.62°N 99.31°W | 0443 | 5 miles (8.0 km) | A massive grain bin was thrown, along with a grain truck. Damage also reported to trees, power lines, farm equipment and outbuildings from this strong rope tornado. |
Sources: NCDC Storm Data

=== June 26 event ===
List of reported tornadoes - Friday, June 26, 2009
| EF# | Location | County | Coord. | Time (UTC) | Path length | Damage |
|---|---|---|---|---|---|---|
Maine
| EF0 | SW of Stockholm | Aroostook | 47.03°N 68.11°W | 1920 | 1 mile (1.6 km) | Intermittent tornado touchdown damaged a few trees. |
Connecticut
| EF1 | Wethersfield | Hartford | 41.70°N 72.67°W | 2050 | 1.7 miles (2.7 km) | Damage mostly to trees though one store had windows blown off and corn crops were flattened. |
Florida
| EF0 | Jacksonville | Duval | 30.20°N 81.65°W | 2100 | 7 miles (11 km) | A waterspout on the St. Johns River came ashore in the Riverside area, with minor damage to buildings and trees. |
Colorado
| EF0 | N of Strasburg | Adams | 39.85°N 104.30°W | 2200 | unknown | Brief tornado with no damage. |
North Dakota
| EF0 | SSW of Maddock | Benson | 47.85°N 99.60°W | 2230 | unknown | Persistent funnel cloud brought down a brief tornado. |
| EF0 | N of Michigan City | Nelson | 48.04°N 98.11°W | 2232 | 3 miles (4.8 km) | Tornado remained over open rangeland. |
| EF0 | S of Ops | Walsh | 48.21°N 98.41°W | 2330 | 3 miles (4.8 km) | Several large tree limbs were knocked down and debris swirls were noted. |
| EF1 | SW of Edisons | Grand Forks | 47.96°N 97.69°W | 2330 | 7 miles (11 km) | Numerous trees were snapped or uprooted. |
| EF1 | S of Grafton | Walsh | 48.38°N 97.39°W | 2335 | 5 miles (8.0 km) | A barn was ripped from its foundation, and several trees and power lines were damaged. |
| EF0 | ESE of Underwood | McLean | 47.41°N 101.00°W | 2343 | 1 mile (1.6 km) | Brief tornado with no damage. |
| EF1 | N of Warsaw | Walsh | 48.29°N 97.26°W | 2345 | 4 miles (6.4 km) | A grain bin was blown down and trees were snapped. |
| EF0 | Warsaw | Walsh | 48.30°N 97.25°W | 2349 | unknown | Brief tornado with no damage. |
| EF0 | W of Mercer | McLean | 47.47°N 100.75°W | 0010 | unknown | Brief tornado with no damage. |
| EF0 | NNW of Manvel | Grand Forks | 48.08°N 97.16°W | 0022 | unknown | Brief tornado with no damage. |
| EF0 | WSW of Grand Forks | Grand Forks | 47.90°N 97.10°W | 0043 | unknown | Brief tornado reported along U.S. Route 2. |
| EF0 | S of Buxton | Traill | 47.52°N 97.09°W | 0212 | 3 miles (4.8 km) | Several trees were damaged. |
| EF1 | SE of Buxton | Traill | 47.58°N 97.06°W | 0212 | 1 mile (1.6 km) | A warehouse building was destroyed, and a few trees were snapped. |
| EF0 | SW of Caledonia | Traill | 47.46°N 96.89°W | 0250 | 1 mile (1.6 km) | A few houses sustained shingle damage, and tree limbs were damaged. |
Nebraska
| EF0 | SE of Hershey | Lincoln | 41.10°N 100.90°W | 0115 | unknown | A few shingles were removed from houses and a hot tub lost its cover. |
| EF1 | W of North Platte | Lincoln | 41.15°N 100.85°W | 0122 | unknown | 14 empty coal cars were destroyed in a railroad yard, and some large trees were damaged. |
Sources: SPC Storm Reports for June 26, 2009, NWS Boston (PNS), NCDC Storm Data

=== June 27 event ===
List of reported tornadoes - Saturday, June 27, 2009
| EF# | Location | County | Coord. | Time (UTC) | Path length | Damage |
|---|---|---|---|---|---|---|
North Dakota
| EF0 | E of Considine | Towner | 48.55°N 99.33°W | 1945 | unknown | Brief tornado with no damage. |
| EF0 | WNW of Considine | Towner | 48.57°N 99.33°W | 1955 | unknown | Brief tornado with no damage. |
South Carolina
| EF0 | SSE of Goose Creek | Berkeley | 32.92°N 80.01°W | 2248 | 0.25 miles (0.40 km) | Brief tornado embedded in a much larger area of straight-line wind damage. |
Sources: SPC Storm Reports for June 27, 2009, NWS Charleston, SC, NCDC Storm Data

=== June 28 event ===
List of reported tornadoes - Sunday, June 28, 2009
| EF# | Location | County | Coord. | Time (UTC) | Path length | Damage |
|---|---|---|---|---|---|---|
Alabama
| EF0 | SW of Albertville | Marshall | 34.20°N 86.28°W | 2150 | 2 miles (3.2 km) | Damage to a barn, corn crops and several trees. |
Sources: SPC Storm Reports for June 28, 2009, NWS Huntsville (PNS), NCDC Storm Data

=== June 30 event ===
List of reported tornadoes - Tuesday, June 30, 2009
| EF# | Location | County | Coord. | Time (UTC) | Path length | Damage |
|---|---|---|---|---|---|---|
Florida
| EF0 | NW of Carrollwood | Hillsborough | 28.06°N 82.51°W | 1905 | unknown | Three pine trees and telephone poles were down. One tree damaged the roof of a home. |
Wyoming
| EF0 | NE of Rozet | Campbell | 44.35°N 105.10°W | 2100 | unknown | Brief tornado with no damage. |
Montana
| EF0 | WNW of Carlyle | Wibaux | 46.67°N 104.15°W | 0008 | unknown | Brief tornado witnessed by a storm chasing tour group. |
Sources: NCDC Storm Data, SPC Storm Reports for June 30, 2009, NWS Tampa Bay

== See also ==
- Tornadoes of 2009
- List of United States tornadoes in May 2009
- List of United States tornadoes from July to August 2009
