= List of United States tornadoes from July to August 2009 =

This is a list of all tornadoes that were confirmed by local offices of the National Weather Service in the United States from July to August 2009.

== July ==
Confirmed tornadoes by Enhanced Fujita rating
EFU	EF0	EF1	EF2	EF3	EF4	EF5	Total
0	80	32	7	1	0	0	120

=== July 1 event ===
List of reported tornadoes - Wednesday, July 1, 2009
EF#	Location	County	Coord.	Time (UTC)	Path length	Damage
Florida
EF0	N of Riverview	Hillsborough	27.88°N 82.32°W	1148	3 miles (4.8 km)	Intermittent tornado touchdown brought down a few trees.
Sources: NCDC Storm Data

=== July 3 event ===
List of reported tornadoes - Friday, July 3, 2009
EF#	Location	County	Coord.	Time (UTC)	Path length	Damage
Kansas
EF0	ENE of New Cambria	Saline	38.88°N 97.45°W	0142	unknown	Brief tornado touchdown in an open field.
Sources: NCDC Storm Data

=== July 4 event ===
List of reported tornadoes - Saturday, July 4, 2009
EF#	Location	County	Coord.	Time (UTC)	Path length	Damage
Kentucky
EF0	NE of Almo	Calloway	36.73°N 88.24°W	2329	1 mile (1.6 km)	Tree limbs and tops downed and field corn blown over.
EF0	SW of Golden Pond	Trigg	36.74°N 88.07°W	2339	0.5 miles (0.80 km)	Tree limbs and tops downed.
EF1	SE of Herndon	Christian	36.72°N 87.55°W	0013	0.5 miles (0.80 km)	Minor shingle damage to one house. Many trees damaged and corn stalks flattened.
Sources: SPC Storm Reports for July 4, 2009, NWS Paducah, NCDC Storm Data

=== July 5 event ===
List of reported tornadoes - Sunday, July 5, 2009
EF#	Location	County	Coord.	Time (UTC)	Path length	Damage
Colorado
EF0	SE of Sterling	Saline	40.60°N 103.15°W	0040	unknown	Brief tornado touchdown with no damage.
Montana
EF0	ENE of Glendive	Dawson	47.16°N 104.47°W	0055	unknown	Brief tornado touchdown confirmed by a storm spotter.
Sources: NCDC Storm Data

=== July 7 event ===
List of reported tornadoes - Tuesday, July 7, 2009
EF#	Location	County	Coord.	Time (UTC)	Path length	Damage
Minnesota
EF0	N of Storden	Cottonwood	44.11°N 95.32°W	2310	unknown	Brief tornado touchdown with no damage.
Sources: NCDC Storm Data

=== July 8 event ===
List of reported tornadoes - Wednesday, July 8, 2009
EF#	Location	County	Coord.	Time (UTC)	Path length	Damage
Illinois
EF0	W of Lancaster	Peoria	40.57°N 89.85°W	2155	unknown	Brief tornado touchdown in an open field.
EF0	WNW of Teheran	Mason	40.22°N 89.80°W	2203	unknown	Brief tornado touchdown in an open field.
South Dakota
EF1	SSW of Deerfield	Pennington	43.85°N 103.92°W	2306	1 mile (1.6 km)	Pine trees that were damaged in a fire in 2000 were snapped and blown down.
EF0	WNW of Parmalee	Todd	43.35°N 101.22°W	0310	4 miles (6.4 km)	Tornado remained over prairie land.
EF0	SE of Mission	Todd	43.25°N 100.60°W	0453	unknown	Small tornado sighted by a storm chaser.
EF1	ENE of Clearfield	Todd	43.20°N 99.94°W	0631	1 mile (1.6 km)	Large cottonwood trees were blown down.
EF1	NE of Clearfield	Todd	43.25°N 99.91°W	0648	1 mile (1.6 km)	A garage was removed from its foundation, a combine was tipped and large cottonwood trees were snapped.
North Dakota
EF0	NE of Sentinel Butte	Golden Valley	47.02°N 103.67°W	0005	1 mile (1.6 km)	Tornado remained over open country.
EF1	Portal area	Burke	48.99°N 102.46°W	0015	10 miles (16 km)	An old barn was destroyed and many trees and power lines were knocked down.
EF0	NNE of Medora	Billings	46.97°N 103.50°W	0027	unknown	Brief tornado touchdown with no damage.
EF0	E of Northgate	Burke	48.98°N 102.19°W	0119	1 mile (1.6 km)	Oil storage tanks were damaged.
EF0	WNW of Powers Lake	Burke	48.59°N 102.67°W	0135	2 miles (3.2 km)	Tornado remained in open country.
EF0	N of Rhame	Bowman	46.25°N 103.65°W	0145	1 mile (1.6 km)	Brief tornado touchdown with no damage.
EF3	Dickinson	Stark	46.88°N 102.79°W	0215	2 miles (3.2 km)	Rain-wrapped tornado destroyed nearly 100 buildings and damaged over 350 others in the southern part of the city. Extensive damage to trees and many vehicles were damaged or flipped as well. Two people were injured.
EF1	S of Sherwood	Renville	48.91°N 101.80°W	0230	11 miles (18 km)	A farm house was damaged by the tornado.
Sources: NWS Bismarck, NCDC Storm Data

=== July 11 event ===
List of reported tornadoes - Saturday, July 11, 2009
EF#	Location	County	Coord.	Time (UTC)	Path length	Damage
Ohio
EF1	Summithill	Ross	39.21°N 83.11°W	1955	3.06 miles (4.92 km)	Two barns were destroyed. Six homes and two mobile homes were damaged as well as numerous trees. Widespread crop damage was reported.
EF1	SSE of Piketon	Pike	39.00°N 82.98°W	2020	0.6 miles (0.97 km)	Damage to about 25 trees and a trampoline was lifted over a fence.
Pennsylvania
EF0	White Deer	Union	41.07°N 76.94°W	2140	1 mile (1.6 km)	Damage limited to a few trees.
Colorado
EF0	ESE of Kutch	Elbert	38.87°N 103.80°W	2335	unknown	Brief tornado touchdown with no damage.
North Dakota
EF0	ESE of Gladstone	Stark	46.85°N 102.50°W	2355	4 miles (6.4 km)	Tornado spotted by trained spotters with no damage.
Sources: NWS Wilmington, OH, NWS State College, NCDC Storm Data

=== July 12 event ===
List of reported tornadoes - Sunday, July 12, 2009
EF#	Location	County	Coord.	Time (UTC)	Path length	Damage
Florida
EF0	NW of Vero Beach	Indian River	27.65°N 80.58°W	2230	unknown	Brief tornado spotted by a local citizen.
Sources: NCDC Storm Data

=== July 13 event ===
List of reported tornadoes - Monday, July 13, 2009
EF#	Location	County	Coord.	Time (UTC)	Path length	Damage
New Mexico
EF0	S of Tres Piedras	Taos	36.32°N 105.97°W	2320	unknown	Brief landspout tornado damaged a barn and some fencing.
South Dakota
EF0	SSW of Parmalee	Todd	43.28°N 101.02°W	2335	unknown	Brief tornado touchdown with no damage.
Wyoming
EF2	NE of Sundance	Crook	44.52°N 104.22°W	0010	9.5 miles (15.3 km)	A large barn and two garages were destroyed at a ranch. The house lost much of its roof while a mobile home had roof and siding damage. 4,000 acres (16 km^{2}) of Ponderosa pine trees were toppled. Two people were injured.
Montana
EF0	W of Frazer	Valley	48.05°N 106.07°W	0133	unknown	First of two brief tornado touchdowns.
EF0	WSW of Frazer	Valley	48.04°N 106.05°W	0140	unknown	First of two brief tornado touchdowns.
Nebraska
EF2	S of Crookston	Cherry	42.79°N 100.75°W	0220	unknown	Damage was mostly confined at a ranch where a trailer home, small outbuilding and metal windbreak were destroyed by a brief but intense tornado. A hay baler was moved 15 yards.
Sources: NWS Rapid City, NWS North Platte, Storm Reports for July 13, 2009, NCDC Storm Data

=== July 14 event ===
List of reported tornadoes - Tuesday, July 14, 2009
EF#	Location	County	Coord.	Time (UTC)	Path length	Damage
Minnesota
EF2	NNE of Swift Falls	Swift, Pope	45.49°N 95.39°W	2121	9 miles (14 km)	Two turkey barns and two garages were completely destroyed. Damage to two residences and some small outbuildings. There was also crop and significant tree damage.
EF1	Spicer area	Kandiyohi	45.23°N 94.94°W	2140	6.5 miles (10.5 km)	Two homes and a garage had roof damage. Dozens of cars at a mall had window damage. Significant tree damage along part of the path. There was additional shingle damage along the path.
EF0	NW of Elrosa	Stearns	45.57°N 94.98°W	2207	0.5 miles (0.80 km)	Brief tornado remained in an open field.
Kansas
EF0	S of Wilroads	Ford	37.57°N 99.97°W	2352	unknown	Brief landspout tornado with no damage.
Sources: NWS Twin Cities, NWS Twin Cities - 2009 tornadoes, Storm Reports for July 14, 2009, NCDC Storm Data

=== July 15 event ===
List of reported tornadoes - Wednesday, July 15, 2009
EF#	Location	County	Coord.	Time (UTC)	Path length	Damage
Florida
EF0	Orlando	Orange	28.42°N 81.47°W	2345	unknown	Brief tornado damaged a warehouse in southwest Orlando near the interchange of John Young Parkway and State Route 528.
Sources: NWS Melbourne, Storm Reports for July 15, 2009, NCDC Storm Data

=== July 16 event ===
List of reported tornadoes - Thursday, July 16, 2009
EF#	Location	County	Coord.	Time (UTC)	Path length	Damage
Vermont
EF0	S of Williamstown	Orange	44.07°N 72.53°W	2305	2.5 miles (4.0 km)	The roof of a barn was blown off. Remainder of damage was limited to hundreds of trees.
Sources: Storm Reports for July 16, 2009, NWS Burlington (PNS), NCDC Storm Data

=== July 17 event (Southeast) ===
List of reported tornadoes - Friday, July 17, 2009
EF#	Location	County	Coord.	Time (UTC)	Path length	Damage
Virginia
EF1	N of Pittsville	Pittsylvania	37.04°N 79.46°W	1448	0.7 miles (1.1 km)	Damage mostly limited to trees. One tree fell on a home.
EF1	Hurt	Pittsylvania	37.09°N 79.31°W	1502	0.6 miles (0.97 km)	Eight structures were damaged by fallen trees including two homes were trees fell through the roof.
EF0	WNW of Brookneal	Campbell	37.06°N 79.01°W	1525	75 yards (100 m)	Many soofwood trees were snapped or downed.
North Carolina
EF0	ENE of Alligoods	Beaufort	35.57°N 76.90°W	2123	1 mile (1.6 km)	Tornado reported by the local fire department with no damage.
EF0	SE of Washington	Beaufort	35.48°N 76.96°W	0012	1.35 miles (2.17 km)	Damage to trees, electrical wires and power poles. 25 homes had damage from falling trees and limbs.
Sources: Storm Reports for July 17, 2009, NWS Blacksburg, NWS Morehead City, NCDC Storm Data

=== July 17 event (Colorado) ===
List of reported tornadoes - Friday, July 17, 2009
EF#	Location	County	Coord.	Time (UTC)	Path length	Damage
Colorado
EF0	NNW of Pritchett	Bent, Baca	37.63°N 102.97°W	0055	3.6 miles (5.8 km)	Tornado remained over open rangeland.
Sources: NCDC Storm Data

=== July 18 event (Maine) ===
List of reported tornadoes - Saturday, July 18, 2009
EF#	Location	County	Coord.	Time (UTC)	Path length	Damage
Maine
EF0	NNE of Bethel	Oxford	44.47°N 70.74°W	2305	1.3 miles (2.1 km)	Damage to trees and at a corn field.
Sources: Storm Reports for July 18, 2009, NWS Portland, ME, NCDC Storm Data

=== July 18 event (New Mexico) ===
List of reported tornadoes - Saturday, July 18, 2009
EF#	Location	County	Coord.	Time (UTC)	Path length	Damage
New Mexico
EF0	SSE of Golden	Santa Fe	35.20°N 106.16°W	0055	1 mile (1.6 km)	Narrow tornado remained over open country.
Sources: NCDC Storm Data

=== July 20 event ===
List of reported tornadoes - Monday, July 20, 2009
EF#	Location	County	Coord.	Time (UTC)	Path length	Damage
Kansas
EF0	NW of St. Francis	Cheyenne	39.75°N 101.87°W	0003	unknown	A car was damaged and a semi-trailer was blown into the ditch on U.S. Route 36.
EF0	E of Rago	Kingman	37.46°N 98.03°W	0009	2 miles (3.2 km)	Rope tornado touched down in an open field.
EF0	N of Goodland	Sherman	39.54°N 101.71°W	0025	2 miles (3.2 km)	Narrow tornado remained in open country.
EF0	NW of Goodland	Sherman	39.37°N 101.70°W	0034	unknown	Brief tornado touchdown with no damage.
EF0	S of Olmitz	Barton	38.50°N 98.91°W	0045	unknown	Brief tornado touchdown with no damage.
EF0	S of McAllister	Logan	38.87°N 101.42°W	0121	unknown	Brief tornado touchdown with no damage.
EF0	SW of Rosalia	Butler	37.77°N 96.64°W	0302	2 miles (3.2 km)	Minor damage took place to a row of trees.
Colorado
EF0	Englewood area	Arapahoe	39.65°N 104.99°W	0508	0.4 miles (0.64 km)	Brief touchdown in the eastern part of the city, rope like tornado. No damage reported.
EF0	S of Castle Rock	Douglas	39.31°N 104.85°W	0539	1 mile (1.6 km)	Debris was seen, but no damage
EF0	N of Castle Rock	Douglas	39.39°N 104.85°W	0539	unknown	Brief tornado touchdown with no damage.
Sources: Storm Reports for July 20, 2009, NWS Goodland, NCDC Storm Data

=== July 21 event ===
List of reported tornadoes - Tuesday, July 21, 2009
EF#	Location	County	Coord.	Time (UTC)	Path length	Damage
Arkansas
EF0	S of Bingen	Hempstead	33.96°N 93.76°W	1842	1.1 miles (1.8 km)	A wellhouse was partially knocked over and there was damage at a metal shop. Trees were snapped along a fence line.
EF0	NE of Mayflower	Faulkner	35.00°N 92.39°W	2112	1.5 miles (2.4 km)	Brief tornado mostly over Lake Conway with no damage.
EF0	NE of Vilonia	Faulkner	35.10°N 92.16°W	2134	1.2 miles (1.9 km)	Roof damage to one home. A judging stand at a horse arena and a shed were destroyed. Trees and fences were blown down.
EF0	N of Sulphur Springs	Jefferson	34.18°N 92.13°W	0120	1.6 miles (2.6 km)	Minor roof damage to a couple of homes. Trees were knocked down, a fence was blown down and various yard items were blown around.
Texas
EF0	ENE of Lakeview	Lynn	33.35°N 101.98°W	2109	unknown	Brief tornado spotted by law enforcement.
Sources: NWS Little Rock (Damage Survey), NWS Little Rock (Event Summary), NWS Shreveport, NCDC Storm Data

=== July 23 event ===
List of reported tornadoes - Thursday, July 23, 2009
EF#	Location	County	Coord.	Time (UTC)	Path length	Damage
Colorado
EF0	S of Boyero	Lincoln	38.85°N 103.27°W	2115	unknown	Brief tornado touchdown with no damage.
EF0	NE of Bristol	Prowers	38.16°N 102.17°W	0126	2 miles (3.2 km)	Tornado remained over open country.
Sources: NCDC Storm Data

=== July 24 event ===
List of reported tornadoes - Friday, July 24, 2009
EF#	Location	County	Coord.	Time (UTC)	Path length	Damage
Maryland
EF0	Elliott	Dorchester	38.31°N 76.00°W	0530	0.25 miles (0.40 km)	Brief waterspout moved onshore on Elliott Island, overturning a travel trailer. Two people were injured.
Florida
EF0	Ormond Beach	Volusia	29.28°N 81.06°W	2146	0.6 miles (0.97 km)	Waterspout came ashore on the beach tossing a catamaran.
EF0	Port Orange	Volusia	29.12°N 81.03°W	2225	0.75 miles (1.21 km)	Over 150 mobile homes were damaged in two mobile home parks. One person was injured.
Wisconsin
EF1	N of Shullsburg	Lafayette	42.61°N 90.29°W	2212	3 miles (4.8 km)	A barn and metal shed were destroyed. Damage to numerous trees and a home.
EF1	NE of New Diggings	Lafayette	42.55°N 90.32°W	2332	4 miles (6.4 km)	A metal shed was destroyed while a house and numerous trees were damaged.
Illinois
EF1	S of Princeton	Bureau	41.35°N 89.46°W	0250	1 mile (1.6 km)	Heavy damage on a farm, with a barn and a grain bin destroyed and its house damaged.
Sources: NWS Wakefield, NWS Melbourne, NWS Milwaukee, Storm reports for July 24, 2009, NCDC Storm Data

=== July 25 event ===
List of reported tornadoes - Saturday, July 25, 2009
EF#	Location	County	Coord.	Time (UTC)	Path length	Damage
New York
EF1	Darien/Corfu	Genesee	42.96°N 78.40°W	2053	4 miles (6.4 km)	One greenhouse and a barn were destroyed. 25 to 30 homes were damaged. Damage to power poles, trees and vehicles.
EF0	Hilton	Monroe	43.29°N 77.79°W	2155	0.75 miles (1.21 km)	Damage to one home and numerous trees. Outdoor objects were tossed around.
Sources: Storm Reports for July 25, 2009, NWS Buffalo, NCDC Storm Data

=== July 26 event ===
List of reported tornadoes - Sunday, July 26, 2009
EF#	Location	County	Coord.	Time (UTC)	Path length	Damage
Pennsylvania
EF1	N of St. Marys	Elk	41.47°N 78.56°W	2221	1.25 miles (2.01 km)	Two homes were damaged and several trees were uprooted.
New York
EF1	Onoville	Cattaraugus	42.02°N 79.06°W	2250	13 miles (21 km)	Awnings were destroyed, trailers were moved or rolled over and boats were damaged. Hundreds of trees were damaged.
EF0	Allegany State Park	Cattaraugus	42.04°N 78.90°W	2315	2.2 miles (3.5 km)	Many trees were damaged in the park.
Sources: NWS Quad Cities, Storm Reports for July 26, 2009, NWS Buffalo, NCDC Storm Data

=== July 27 event ===
List of reported tornadoes - Monday, July 27, 2009
EF#	Location	County	Coord.	Time (UTC)	Path length	Damage
Florida
EF0	SSW of Rocky Creek	Hillsborough	27.97°N 82.60°W	1527	unknown	Brief waterspout made landfall along the Courtney Campbell Causeway.
Wisconsin
EF1	W of Soldiers Grove	Crawford	43.38°N 90.90°W	2216	4 miles (6.4 km)	A few barns and outbuildings were damaged or destroyed. EF1 damage included an LP tank at a barn.
EF1	SW of Montello	Marquette, Green Lake	43.76°N 89.38°W	2248	9 miles (14 km)	Minor roof damage to a pole barn and a mobile home. Many trees were knocked down.
EF0	NE of Gratiot	Lafayette	42.60°N 90.00°W	0110	0.1 miles (0.16 km)	Minor roof damage to two farm houses. Tree limbs smashed three vehicles.
Colorado
EF0	NW of Limon	Lincoln	39.37°N 103.68°W	2321	unknown	Brief tornado touchdown with no damage.
Wyoming
EF0	S of Savageton	Campbell	39.37°N 103.68°W	2325	1 mile (1.6 km)	Tornado damaged a shed and fencing.
Sources: NWS La Crosse, NWS Milwaukee, NCDC Storm Data

=== July 28 event ===
List of reported tornadoes - Tuesday, July 28, 2009
EF#	Location	County	Coord.	Time (UTC)	Path length	Damage
Texas
EF1	SE of Crossroads	Harrison	32.42°N 94.18°W	1428	unknown	Two houses and a mobile home were damaged and a car was crushed by falling trees.
Kansas
EF0	SSW of Centralia	Nemaha	39.69°N 96.15°W	1820	unknown	Brief landspout tornado with no damage.
Mississippi
EF0	ESE of Patrick	Patrick	33.48°N 88.72°W	2043	unknown	Brief tornado remained over farmland.
Tennessee
EF1	SW of Goodbars	Warren	35.69°N 85.62°W	2232	1 mile (1.6 km)	A barn, grain silo and several farm buildings were destroyed, and a house was damaged.
Alabama
EF0	NW of Elkmont	Limestone	34.95°N 87.00°W	0055	275 yards (300 m)	Damage limited to trees.
Sources: Storm Reports for July 28, 2009, NWS Huntsville (PNS), NCDC Storm Data

=== July 29 event (Northeast) ===
List of reported tornadoes - Wednesday, July 29, 2009
EF#	Location	County	Coord.	Time (UTC)	Path length	Damage
Pennsylvania
EF0	Tunkhannock (1st tornado)	Wyoming	41.51°N 75.96°W	1718	262 yards (200 m)	Damage to many trees, a shed, a corn field and a barn.
EF0	Tunkhannock (2nd tornado)	Wyoming	41.52°N 75.95°W	1722	442 yards (400 m)	Damage at the airport where there was a farm outbuilding with roof damage. Damage to corn stalks and trees.
EF2	Stroudsburg area	Monroe	40.98°N 75.20°W	1735	4.6 miles (7.4 km)	Four large farm buildings and a garage were destroyed. Several houses and a resort building lost their roofs. Two people were injured. First strong tornado since 1979 in Monroe County.
Maryland
EF0	WNW of Oldtown	Allegany	39.54°N 78.62°W	1848	1 mile (1.6 km)	Hardwood trees were uprooted and power poles were snapped.
EF0	SW of Belle Grove	Allegany	39.69°N 78.21°W	1929	1 mile (1.6 km)	Tree damage was found from a tornado touchdown.
New Jersey
EF2	NNE of Pellettown	Sussex	41.23°N 74.65°W	1848	7 miles (11 km)	Two barns partially collapsed. A silo was destroyed with two others damaged. Thousands of trees were damaged, along with large swaths of farmland where at least one farm animal was killed. Strongest tornado ever since records are kept in Sussex County, New Jersey and first F2 or EF2 tornado in New Jersey since May 27, 2001.
New York
EF0	Unionville	Orange	41.29°N 74.57°W	1905	1 mile (1.6 km)	Damage to many trees, some of which fell on homes and cars.
Sources: Storm Reports for July 29, 2009, NWS Philadelphia, NWS New York City (PNS), NWS Binghamton, NCDC Storm Data

=== July 29 event (Colorado) ===
List of reported tornadoes - Wednesday, July 29, 2009
EF#	Location	County	Coord.	Time (UTC)	Path length	Damage
Colorado
EF0	W of Pritchett	Baca	37.37°N 103.00°W	2258	unknown	Brief landspout tornado with no damage.
EF0	SSE of Resolis	Elbert	39.18°N 103.77°W	2328	unknown	A house was damaged, and power poles were removed from the ground.
Sources: NCDC Storm Data

=== July 30 event ===
List of reported tornadoes - Thursday, July 30, 2009
EF#	Location	County/Parish	Coord.	Time (UTC)	Path length	Damage
Louisiana
EF0	NW of Gayles	Caddo	32.34°N 93.64°W	1615	1.1 miles (1.8 km)	A small outbuilding was destroyed. One metal shed was blown over and a second shed was collapsed. Many trees and power lines were downed.
Arkansas
EF1	S of Princeton	Dallas	33.87°N 92.66°W	1942	2.3 miles (3.7 km)	Damage limited to trees with some taking down power lines.
EF2	Tichnor to Elaine	Arkansas, Phillips, Coahoma (MS)	34.06°N 91.26°W	2023	32.1 miles (51.7 km)	Large wedge tornado damaged thousands of trees, especially in the White River National Wildlife Refuge. Damage also took place at the Phillips County Airport. Dozens of mobile homes, houses and hunting camps were also damaged or destroyed. Tornado crossed the Mississippi River four times.
EF0	N of Hydrick	Poinsett	35.47°N 90.76°W	2048	5 miles (8.0 km)	Several buildings and many trees were damaged.
EF0	Cummins	Lincoln	34.07°N 91.56°W	2111	2 miles (3.2 km)	A shed and some trees were damaged at the Cummins Prison.
Illinois
EF0	NE of Capron	Boone	42.40°N 88.74°W	2126	unknown	Brief tornado damaged a few tree limbs.
Tennessee
EF1	Cordova	Shelby	35.19°N 89.79°W	2151	2.1 miles (3.4 km)	Damage to a car dealership, a motel, a restaurant, a Kohl's store, a couple of baseball fields, several other businesses, a golf course and several homes.
EF1	Lexington	Henderson	35.65°N 88.39°W	0052	4 miles (6.4 km)	Damage to trees and power lines. An outbuilding was destroyed with a second one damaged. A mobile home was shoved into a power pole.
EF0	Wildersville	Henderson		0052	200 yards (200 m)	Roof damage to a church with other damage to a shed and a power pole.
EF1	W of Westmoreland	Sumner	36.51°N 86.30°W	0400	3 miles (4.8 km)	One barn was flattened. Damage to outbuildings and carports with light damage to several homes. Hundreds of trees were affected.
Mississippi
EF2	SE of Olive Branch	De Soto	34.91°N 89.78°W	2200	5.8 miles (9.3 km)	Over 140 houses and businesses were damaged, including at least seven houses that were destroyed.
Kentucky
EF1	N of Scottsville	Allen	36.87°N 86.20°W	0435	1 mile (1.6 km)	Structural damage to two barns and one residence. Numerous trees were damaged.
Sources: Storm Reports for July 30, 2009, NWS Shreveport (PNS), NWS Memphis, NWS Nashville (PNS), NWS Little Rock (PNS), NWS Little Rock (Event Summary), NWS Louisville, NCDC Storm Data

=== July 31 event ===
List of reported tornadoes - Friday, July 31, 2009
EF#	Location	County	Coord.	Time (UTC)	Path length	Damage
Ohio
EF1	S of Wooster	Wayne	40.71°N 81.92°W	1145	440 yards (400 m)	Major damage to a pole barn.
Maryland
EF1	WSW of Ijamsville	Frederick	39.35°N 77.36°W	1806	2.5 miles (4.0 km)	Barns were destroyed and three homes were damaged. Hundreds of trees were affected.
EF1	W of Monrovia	Frederick	39.37°N 77.30°W	1808	2.5 miles (4.0 km)	Minor damage to one home and a clubhouse at a golf course. Trees fell on some homes and lawn and patio furniture were moved some distance.
EF0	Gamber	Carroll	39.46°N 76.93°W	1840	1 mile (1.6 km)	A couple of residences had minor roof damage. Numerous trees and a corn field were affected.
EF1	Alpha	Howard	39.32°N 76.92°W	1842	unknown	Brief tornado knocked down many trees.
Connecticut
EF1	SE of Shelton	Fairfield	41.29°N 73.06°W	1956	0.5 miles (0.80 km)	Damage limited to trees.
EF1	NE of East River	New Haven	41.29°N 72.60°W	2028	3 miles (4.8 km)	Intermittent tornado touchdown snapped or uprooted numerous trees.
Kansas
EF0	S of Gove	Gove	38.77°N 100.45°W	0142	unknown	Brief tornado confirmed by storm chasers.
EF0	SSE of Gove	Gove	38.75°N 100.40°W	0144	unknown	Second brief tornado confirmed by storm chasers.
EF0	ENE of Pendennis	Lane	38.65°N 100.27°W	0225	1 mile (1.6 km)	Tornado remained over open country.
EF0	WSW of Utica	Ness	38.62°N 100.23°W	0232	unknown	Brief tornado with no damage.
Sources: Storm Reports for July 31, 2009, NWS New York City (PNS), NWS Baltimore/Washington (PNS), NWS Cleveland, NCDC Storm Data

== August ==
Confirmed tornadoes by Enhanced Fujita rating
EFU	EF0	EF1	EF2	EF3	EF4	EF5	Total
0	38	18	2	1	0	0	60

Note: 1 tornado was confirmed in the final totals, but does not have a listed rating.

=== August 2 event ===
List of reported tornadoes - Sunday, August 2, 2009
EF#	Location	County	Coord.	Time (UTC)	Path length	Damage
New York
EF0	Kirkwood	Broome	42.04°N 75.77°W	1735	175 yards (200 m)	Damage limited to trees.
Kansas
EF0	SE of Satanta	Haskell	37.40°N 100.95°W	0140	1 mile (1.6 km)	Narrow tornado resulted in minimal damage to corn crops.
EF1	SW of Satanta	Haskell, Seward	37.39°N 100.97°W	0150	4 miles (6.4 km)	A house and two grain bins were damaged. Damage was also reported to corn crops and a pivot sprinkler.
Sources: Storm Reports for August 2, 2009, NWS Binghamton, NCDC Storm Data

=== August 4 event ===
List of reported tornadoes - Tuesday, August 4, 2009
EF#	Location	County	Coord.	Time (UTC)	Path length	Damage
Indiana
EF1	Eminence	Morgan	39.52°N 86.63°W	1610	unknown	A mobile home was destroyed while another home and a garage lost their roof. Initially classified as a microburst but later determined to be a tornado.
Kentucky
EF0	N of Hopkinsville	Christian	36.88°N 87.49°W	2355	1 mile (1.6 km)	Damage to two fiberglass light poles and several trees. One person was injured by flying debris.
Sources: Storm Reports for August 4, 2009, NWS Paducah, NWS Indianapolis, NCDC Storm Data

=== August 6 event ===
List of reported tornadoes - Thursday, August 6, 2009
EF#	Location	County	Coord.	Time (UTC)	Path length	Damage
Utah
EF0	NW of Leota	Uintah	40.18°N 109.69°W	2210	2 miles (3.2 km)	Tornado traveled along Pelican Lake, flipping a trailer.
EF0	Vernal	Uintah	40.45°N 109.53°W	2339	unknown	Minor damage to a few sheds and tree limbs.
Sources: NCDC Storm Data

=== August 8 event ===
List of reported tornadoes - Saturday, August 8, 2009
EF#	Location	County	Coord.	Time (UTC)	Path length	Damage
Minnesota
EF1	Minnetrista	Hennepin	44.95°N 93.67°W	0133	9.5 miles (15.3 km)	Damage to roofs and some signs of buildings. Minor damage to residences and a boat was thrown.
Colorado
EF0	S of Kaufman	Weld	40.67°N 103.82°W	0302	unknown	Brief tornado touchdown with no damage.
Wisconsin
EF1	N of Burkhardt	St. Croix	45.03°N 92.66°W	0324	5 miles (8.0 km)	Several garages were destroyed and several homes were damaged. Hundreds of trees were affected.
EF0	NW of Hammond	St. Croix	45.02°N 92.46°W	0351	0.5 miles (0.80 km)	Several homes were damaged including portions of a roof of one home.
Sources: NWS Twin Cities, NCDC Storm Data

=== August 9 event ===
List of reported tornadoes - Sunday, August 9, 2009
EF#	Location	County	Coord.	Time (UTC)	Path length	Damage
New York
EF1	New Hudson/Cuba	Allegany	42.32°N 78.28°W	1805	8 miles (13 km)	A communication tower collapsed and several homes had minor damage. Cars were damaged by fallen trees.
Pennsylvania
EF1	Tyler	Elk, Clearfield	41.25°N 78.52°W	2058	1.5 miles (2.4 km)	Damage to one home and several trees.
Sources: NWS Buffalo, NWS State College, NCDC Storm Data

=== August 12 event ===
List of reported tornadoes - Wednesday, August 12, 2009
EF#	Location	County	Coord.	Time (UTC)	Path length	Damage
South Carolina
EF0	N of Forney	Horry	33.84°N 79.16°W	1800	1.12 miles (1.80 km)	An abandoned barn and a mobile home were damaged, as were many trees.
Florida
EF0	NNE of Auburndale	Polk	28.10°N 81.77°W	2120	unknown	Brief tornado damaged fences, sheds a screened porch and playground equipment.
Sources: NCDC Storm Data

=== August 14 event ===
List of reported tornadoes - Friday, August 14, 2009
EF#	Location	County	Coord.	Time (UTC)	Path length	Damage
Wyoming
EF0	SE of Worland	Washakie	43.84°N 107.70°W	2317	1 mile (1.6 km)	Tornado remained over open country.
Sources: NCDC Storm Data

=== August 15 event ===
List of reported tornadoes - Saturday, August 15, 2009
EF#	Location	County	Coord.	Time (UTC)	Path length	Damage
Colorado
EF0	SE of Dinosaur	Moffat	40.22°N 108.96°W	2000	3 miles (4.8 km)	Tornado remained over open country.
Sources: NCDC Storm Data

=== August 16 event ===
List of reported tornadoes - Sunday, August 16, 2009
EF#	Location	County	Coord.	Time (UTC)	Path length	Damage
Florida
EF0	Cape Coral	Lee	26.42°N 81.59°W	2042	0.35 miles (0.56 km)	Eleven structures were damaged. Damage mostly to roofs, windows, soffits, fascia and outdoor equipment. One car was flipped up into a garage home.
Sources: NWS Tampa Bay, NCDC Storm Data

=== August 17 event ===
List of reported tornadoes - Monday, August 17, 2009
EF#	Location	County	Coord.	Time (UTC)	Path length	Damage
Colorado
EF0	NW of Kutch	Elbert	39.00°N 104.00°W	2000	unknown	Brief tornado touchdown with no damage.
Sources: NCDC Storm Data

=== August 18 event ===
List of reported tornadoes - Tuesday, August 18, 2009
EF#	Location	County	Coord.	Time (UTC)	Path length	Damage
Texas
EF1	NW of Beaumont	Jefferson	30.11°N 94.18°W	1857	1 mile (1.6 km)	Tornado struck a commercial area surrounding Parkdale Mall, with the mall damaged as well as a Kohl's store. Several department stores had roof damage and several cars flipped over. 10 people were injured.
Colorado
EF1	Lake George area	Park	38.95°N 105.51°W	1916	9 miles (14 km)	Several buildings were damaged, as were many trees.
EF0	SE of Walsenburg	Huerfano	37.49°N 104.53°W	2018	1 mile (1.6 km)	Brief tornado in open country.
New Mexico
EF0	ENE of Mills	Harding	36.08°N 104.20°W	2209	unknown	Brief tornado touchdown with no damage.
Sources: NWS Lake Charles, NCDC Storm Data

=== August 19 event ===
List of reported tornadoes - Wednesday, August 19, 2009
EF#	Location	County	Coord.	Time (UTC)	Path length	Damage
Minnesota
EF0	Minneapolis	Hennepin	44.91°N 93.27°W	1850	4.5 miles (7.2 km)	Damage to many trees and a church in the downtown area. Minor damage to homes mostly due to trees landing on them.
EF1	SE of New Trier	Washington	44.57°N 92.90°W	1916	2 miles (3.2 km)	A farm house lost its roof, and several outbuildings were destroyed.
EF1	SE of Cottage Grove	Washington	44.78°N 92.87°W	1940	0.5 miles (0.80 km)	Damage mainly to trees, almost some roofs of homes and playground equipment were affected.
EF0	S of Lake Netta	Anoka	45.25°N 93.20°W	2007	unknown	Brief tornado in an unpopulated area of Ham Lake.
EF0	Marine on St. Croix	Washington	45.20°N 92.77°W	2025	1 mile (1.6 km)	Scattered tree and limb damage in the community.
EF0	SE of North Branch	Chisago	45.51°N 92.97°W	2100	1 mile (1.6 km)	Damage to the roof of the middle school, telephone poles and numerous trees.
EF0	SE of Springfield	Brown	44.24°N 94.91°W	2328	4 miles (6.4 km)	Slow-moving tornado damaged some crops.
Illinois
EF1	S of Alsey to SW of Franklin	Greene, Scott, Morgan	39.51°N 90.41°W	1910	16 miles (26 km)	Damage to mobile homes, grain bins, farm machinery sheds, many crops and many trees near the Manchester area.
EF2	NW of Franklin to NW of Chatham	Morgan, Sangamon	39.63°N 89.99°W	1946	19 miles (31 km)	13 houses in Loami were destroyed along with 19 others with major damage. Several other houses as well as farm machinery sheds, many crops and numerous trees were damaged along the path. Three people were injured.
EF1	SE of Springfield	Sangamon	39.71°N 89.59°W	2017	13 miles (21 km)	Damage along the shores of Lake Springfield, including the yacht club. Widespread tree and crop damage.
EF3	Williamsville to E of Beason	Sangamon, Logan	39.95°N 89.54°W	2019	24.5 miles (39.4 km)	In Williamsville, an antique mall was destroyed, with damage along the path to several homes, a metal building, an agriculture business and a gas station. A horse trailer was thrown into a church. 17 people in Sangamon County were injured, including two motorcyclists on Interstate 55. Elsewhere in Sangamon County, east of Williamsville, one home was completely destroyed with several other homes, outbuildings, vehicles, machine sheds and cornfields being damaged. In Logan County, additional outbuildings were destroyed, with grain bins blown away and damage to trees, crops and some homes. Two people were injured in Logan County.
EF0	N of Midland City	De Witt	40.15°N 89.13°W	2104	2 miles (3.2 km)	Damage to crops and trees.
EF0	S of Holder	McLean	40.41°N 88.79°W	2127	2.5 miles (4.0 km)	Damage limited to some crops.
EF0	NE of Collision	Vermilion	40.24°N 87.73°W	2210	4.5 miles (7.2 km)	Two houses and numerous outbuildings were damaged, along with some trees and crops.
EF1	NE of Watseka	Iroquois	40.83°N 87.73°W	2300	2.75 miles (4.43 km)	A barn and a garage were destroyed with damage to many trees, a silo and another garage which was partially collapsed.
EF1	N of Elburn	Kane	41.90°N 88.47°W	2300	1 mile (1.6 km)	Multiple hardwood and softwood trees were snapped. Corn crops were flatenned
EF0	Lily Lake	Kane	41.93°N 88.47°W	2315	1.5 miles (2.4 km)	Damage to many trees and limbs.
Wisconsin
EF0	N of Esdaile	Pierce	44.67°N 92.42°W	1957	unknown	Brief tornado damaged a tree and crops.
EF0	NW of Hudson	St. Croix	44.98°N 92.76°W	2005	0.33 miles (0.53 km)	Minor damage to several houses with multiple trees uprooted.
EF0	W of Emerald	St. Croix	45.05°N 92.30°W	2058	1 mile (1.6 km)	Vegetation was briefly tossed into the air.
EF0	N of Forest	St. Croix	45.14°N 92.26°W	2111	2 miles (3.2 km)	Tornado confirmed by a trained spotter with no damage.
Iowa
EF0	SE of Fredericksburg	Chickasaw	42.92°N 92.14°W	2009	0.5 miles (0.80 km)	A barn and a garage sustained damage in this brief tornado.
EF0	SW of West Union	Fayette	42.94°N 91.85°W	2050	4 miles (6.4 km)	Narrow tornado path damaged some trees and corn stalks, as well as a barn and a roof of a house.
EF0	SSE of Saratoga	Howard	43.35°N 92.40°W	2050	unknown	Brief tornado remained in a corn field.
EF0	NE of Calmar	Winneshiek	43.19°N 91.85°W	2100	4 miles (6.4 km)	A corn field was heavily damaged, and minor tree damage was noted.
EF1	S of Stanley	Buchanan	42.61°N 91.81°W	2130	2 miles (3.2 km)	Two farmstead, two hog confinements, one home, a silo, a pole building and many trees were damaged.
EF0	N of Martelle	Jones	42.02°N 91.36°W	2220	0.1 miles (0.16 km)	Minor tree damage and damage to a storage building.
Ohio
EF0	W of Greenville	Darke	40.11°N 84.67°W	2230	unknown	No damage reported as tornado touched down in an open field.
Indiana
EF2	Chesterton area	Porter	41.60°N 87.06°W	0032	2.5 miles (4.0 km)	Damage at Chesterton High School with the roof of the gymnasium partially collapsed. An apartment building and a warehouse lost the roof. Additional damage to many trees, a garage roof and a storage building. In total, 8 structures were destroyed, 54 sustained major damage and 149 others were damaged.
Missouri
EF1	N of Roby	Texas	37.60°N 92.14°W	0505	0.75 miles (1.21 km)	A mobile was rolled and destroyed injuring one person. Damage to two frame homes, an outbuilding and several trees
Sources: NWS Chicago (#1), NWS Chicago (#2), NWS Chicago (#3), NWS Twin Cities, NWS Quad Cities, NWS Springfield, MO, NWS Lincoln, IL, NWS La Crosse, Storm Reports for August 19, 2009, NCDC Storm Data

=== August 20 event ===
List of reported tornadoes - Thursday, August 20, 2009
EF#	Location	County	Coord.	Time (UTC)	Path length	Damage
Ohio
EF0	SSE of Kingston	Ross	39.44°N 82.90°W	2020	0.25 miles (0.40 km)	Minor crop damage was reported.
Sources: NWS Wilmington, OH (PNS), NCDC Storm Data

=== August 21 event ===
List of reported tornadoes - Friday, August 21, 2009
EF#	Location	County	Coord.	Time (UTC)	Path length	Damage
Maine
EF1	Norway to Hartford	Oxford	44.24°N 70.58°W	2022	16 miles (26 km)	Thousands of trees were knocked down damaging or destroying some buildings, wares and utility poles.
Sources: Storm Reports for August 21, 2009, NCDC Storm Data

=== August 26 event ===
List of reported tornadoes - Wednesday, August 26, 2009
EF#	Location	County	Coord.	Time (UTC)	Path length	Damage
Texas
EF0	WNW of Lubbock	Lubbock	33.60°N 101.89°W	2249	unknown	Brief tornado remained over a golf course where there was no damage.
Sources: NCDC Storm Data

=== August 29 event ===
List of reported tornadoes - Saturday, August 29, 2009
EF#	Location	County	Coord.	Time (UTC)	Path length	Damage
New York
EF0	Canandaigua area	Ontario	42.89°N 77.28°W	1705	11 miles (18 km)	Several houses were damaged, along with many large boats which were thrown on Canandaigua Lake.
Sources: Storm Reports for August 29, 2009, NCDC Storm Data

=== August 30 event ===
List of reported tornadoes - Sunday, August 30, 2009
EF#	Location	County	Coord.	Time (UTC)	Path length	Damage
Texas
EF0	SW of Rockport	Rockport	27.96°N 97.15°W	2058	3 miles (4.8 km)	Power lines were blown down around Aransas Pass.
EF1	Galveston	Galveston	29.28°N 94.79°W	0250	unknown	A waterspout moved onshore at the Galveston Seawall, damaging several buildings in the city. Three people were injured.
Sources: NCDC Storm Data

== See also ==
- Tornadoes of 2009
- List of United States tornadoes in June 2009
- List of United States tornadoes from September to October 2009
