= Flinthills USD 492 =

Public school district in Rosalia, Kansas

Address
- 806 SE Rosalia Rd. Rosalia, Kansas, 67132; United States
- Coordinates: 37.8124°N 96.6182°W

District information
- Type: Public
- Grades: PreK to 12
- Schools: 2

Other information
- Website: usd492.org

Flinthills USD 492 is a public unified school district headquartered in Rosalia, Kansas, United States. The district includes the communities of Rosalia, Cassoday, Pontiac, and nearby rural areas.

== School ==
The school district operates the following schools:

- Flinthills Middle/High School in Rosalia, 6th to 12th grades
- Flinthills Primary School in Cassoday, PreK to 5th grades

== See also ==
- Kansas State Department of Education
- Kansas State High School Activities Association
- List of high schools in Kansas
- List of unified school districts in Kansas
