= Sycamore Township, Butler County, Kansas =

Sycamore Township Butler County, Kansas
- Township
- Location within Butler County

- Location within Kansas
- Coordinates: 38°01′40″N 096°39′26″W
- Country: United States
- State: Kansas
- County: Butler

Area
  - Total: 114.68 sq mi (297.01 km^{2})
  - Land: 113.80 sq mi (294.75 km^{2})
  - Water: 0.87 sq mi (2.26 km^{2}) 0.76%
- Elevation: 1,450 ft (440 m)

Population (2000)
  - Total: 333
  - Density: 2.93/sq mi (1.13/km^{2})
- Time zone: UTC-6 (CST)
  - Summer (DST): UTC-5 (CDT)
- FIPS code: 20-69700
- GNIS ID: 474399
- Website: County website

Sycamore Township is a township in Butler County, Kansas, United States. As of the 2000 census, its population was 333.

== History ==
Sycamore Township was organized in 1871. It was named for a large sycamore tree which has long since blown over.

== Geography ==
Sycamore Township covers an area of 114.67 square miles (297.0 km^{2}) and contains one incorporated settlement, Cassoday. According to the USGS, it contains one cemetery, Cassoday. The stream of School Branch runs through this township.
