= Pontiac, Kansas =

Unincorporated community in Butler County, Kansas

Coordinates: 37°49′03″N 96°42′58″W

Pontiac is an unincorporated community in Butler County, Kansas, United States.

== History ==
A post office was opened in Pontiac in 1873, and remained in operation until it was discontinued in 1926.

== Education ==
The community is served by Flinthills USD 492 public school district.
