= Cassoday, Kansas =

City in Butler County, Kansas

- City
- Location within Butler County and Kansas

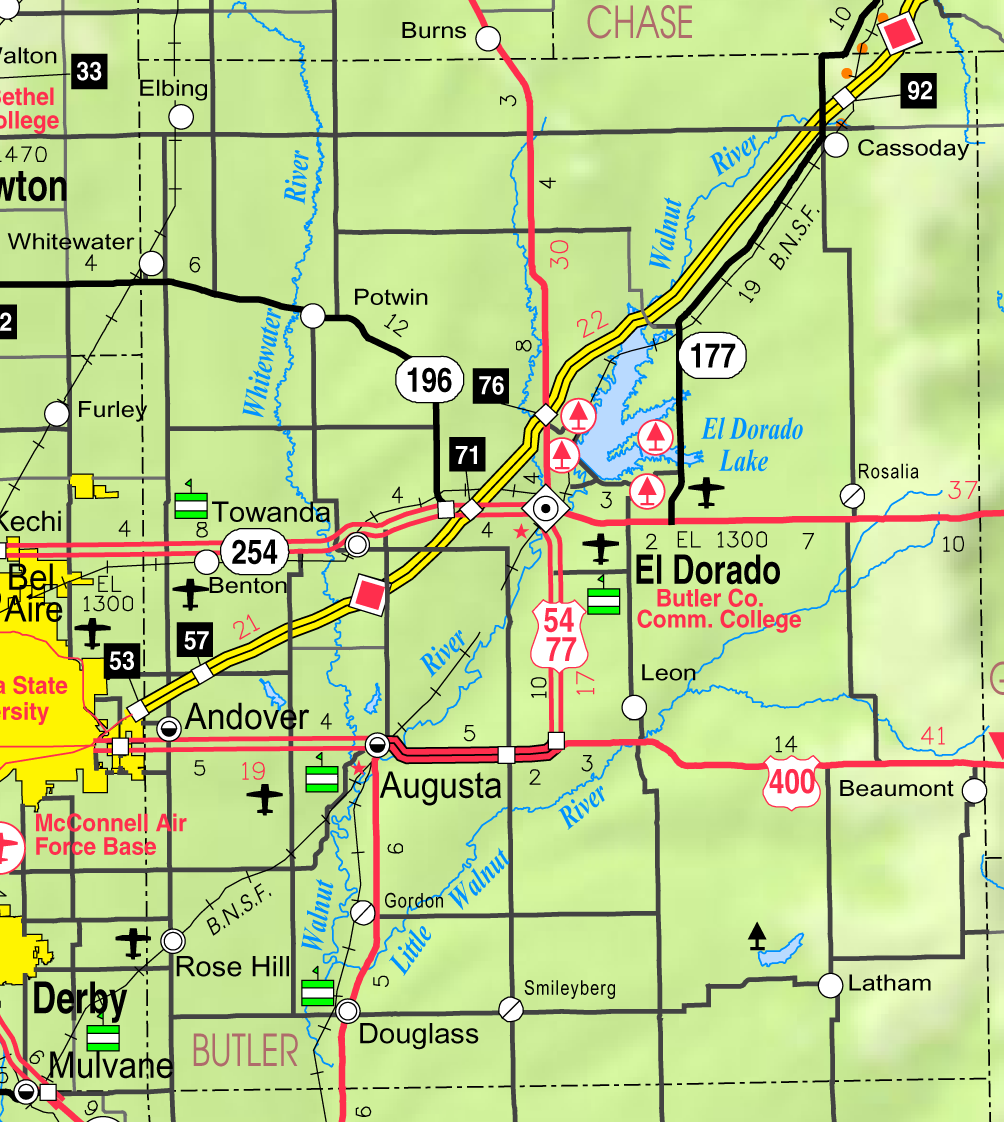
- KDOT map of Butler County (legend)
- Coordinates: 38°02′19″N 96°38′19″W
- Country: United States
- State: Kansas
- County: Butler
- Incorporated: 1960
- Named for: John B. Cassoday

Government
  - Type: Mayor–Council
  - Mayor: David Hinde

Area
  - Total: 0.34 sq mi (0.88 km^{2})
  - Land: 0.34 sq mi (0.88 km^{2})
  - Water: 0 sq mi (0.00 km^{2})
- Elevation: 1,476 ft (450 m)

Population (2020)
  - Total: 113
  - Density: 330/sq mi (130/km^{2})
- Time zone: UTC-6 (CST)
  - Summer (DST): UTC-5 (CDT)
- ZIP Code: 66842
- Area code: 620
- FIPS code: 20-10925
- GNIS ID: 2393768

Cassoday is a city in Butler County, Kansas, United States. It is known as the "Prairie Chicken Capital of the World". As of the 2020 census, the population of the city was 113.

== History ==
=== Early history ===
For many millennia, the Great Plains of North America was inhabited by nomadic Native Americans. From the 16th century to 18th century, the Kingdom of France claimed ownership of large parts of North America. In 1762, after the French and Indian War, France secretly ceded New France to Spain, per the Treaty of Fontainebleau.

=== 19th century ===
In 1802, Spain returned most of the land to France. In 1803, most of the land for modern day Kansas was acquired by the United States from France as part of the 828,000 square mile Louisiana Purchase for 2.83 cents per acre.

In 1854, the Kansas Territory was organized, then in 1861 Kansas became the 34th U.S. state. In 1855, Butler County was established within the Kansas Territory, which included the land for modern day Cassoday.

Cassoday was named for John B. Cassoday, chief justice of the Wisconsin Supreme Court.

The first post office was in Cassoday was established on July 9, 1906.

== Geography ==
Cassoday is located at 38°2′19″N 96°38′18″W (38.038545, -96.638252), in the scenic Flint Hills. According to the United States Census Bureau, the city has a total area of 0.39 square miles (1.01 km^{2}), all land.

=== Climate ===
The climate in this area is characterized by hot, humid summers and generally mild to cool winters. According to the Köppen Climate Classification system, Cassoday has a humid subtropical climate, abbreviated "Cfa" on climate maps.

== Area events ==
- Cassoday Bike Run, First Sunday of every month March through November. As many as 5000 bikers meet in what has become a summer tradition for motorcycle enthusiasts.

== Area attractions ==
- Cassoday Historical Museum. It is located in the former railroad depot.

== Demographics ==
Historical population
Census	Pop.	Note	%±
1970	123		—
1980	122		−0.8%
1990	95		−22.1%
2000	130		36.8%
2010	129		−0.8%
2020	113		−12.4%
U.S. Decennial Census

=== 2020 census ===
The 2020 United States census counted 113 people, 43 households, and 29 families in Cassoday. The population density was 332.4 per square mile (128.3/km^{2}). There were 57 housing units at an average density of 167.6 per square mile (64.7/km^{2}). The racial makeup was 89.38% (101) white or European American (89.38% non-Hispanic white), 0.0% (0) black or African-American, 0.0% (0) Native American or Alaska Native, 0.0% (0) Asian, 0.0% (0) Pacific Islander or Native Hawaiian, 0.88% (1) from other races, and 9.73% (11) from two or more races. Hispanic or Latino of any race was 4.42% (5) of the population.

Of the 43 households, 23.3% had children under the age of 18; 48.8% were married couples living together; 14.0% had a female householder with no spouse or partner present. 25.6% of households consisted of individuals and 7.0% had someone living alone who was 65 years of age or older. The average household size was 2.5 and the average family size was 3.0. The percent of those with a bachelor's degree or higher was estimated to be 22.1% of the population.

26.5% of the population was under the age of 18, 7.1% from 18 to 24, 17.7% from 25 to 44, 32.7% from 45 to 64, and 15.9% who were 65 years of age or older. The median age was 42.3 years. For every 100 females, there were 82.3 males. For every 100 females ages 18 and older, there were 76.6 males.

The 2016–2020 5-year American Community Survey estimates show that the median household income was $63,750 (with a margin of error of +/- $23,907) and the median family income was $78,750 (+/- $22,763). Males had a median income of $50,625 (+/- $11,417) versus $23,125 (+/- $9,497) for females. The median income for those above 16 years old was $35,357 (+/- $12,820). Approximately, 5.0% of families and 8.8% of the population were below the poverty line, including 21.9% of those under the age of 18 and 0.0% of those ages 65 or over.

=== 2010 census ===
As of the census of 2010, there were 129 people, 55 households, and 36 families residing in the city. The population density was 330.8 inhabitants per square mile (127.7/km^{2}). There were 70 housing units at an average density of 179.5 per square mile (69.3/km^{2}). The racial makeup of the city was 95.3% White, 1.6% African American, 0.8% Asian, 0.8% Pacific Islander, and 1.6% from two or more races.

There were 55 households, of which 34.5% had children under the age of 18 living with them, 49.1% were married couples living together, 5.5% had a female householder with no husband present, 10.9% had a male householder with no wife present, and 34.5% were non-families. 30.9% of all households were made up of individuals, and 7.2% had someone living alone who was 65 years of age or older. The average household size was 2.35 and the average family size was 2.94.

The median age in the city was 42.8 years. 27.9% of residents were under the age of 18; 7.1% were between the ages of 18 and 24; 17.9% were from 25 to 44; 29.6% were from 45 to 64; and 17.8% were 65 years of age or older. The gender makeup of the city was 51.2% male and 48.8% female.

=== 2000 census ===
As of the census of 2000, there were 130 people, 54 households, and 36 families residing in the city. The population density was 393.4 inhabitants per square mile (151.9/km^{2}). There were 57 housing units at an average density of 172.5 per square mile (66.6/km^{2}). The racial makeup of the city was 100.00% White. Hispanic or Latino of any race were 3.85% of the population.

There were 54 households, out of which 25.9% had children under the age of 18 living with them, 59.3% were married couples living together, 7.4% had a female householder with no husband present, and 31.5% were non-families. 29.6% of all households were made up of individuals, and 14.8% had someone living alone who was 65 years of age or older. The average household size was 2.41 and the average family size was 3.00.

In the city, the population was spread out, with 26.2% under the age of 18, 5.4% from 18 to 24, 26.9% from 25 to 44, 21.5% from 45 to 64, and 20.0% who were 65 years of age or older. The median age was 37 years. For every 100 females, there were 78.1 males. For every 100 females age 18 and over, there were 84.6 males.

The median income for a household in the city was $41,250, and the median income for a family was $49,688. Males had a median income of $31,875 versus $30,833 for females. The per capita income for the city was $17,807. There were 5.1% of families and 7.8% of the population living below the poverty line, including 19.0% of under eighteens and none of those over 64.

== Government ==
The Cassoday government consists of a mayor and five council members. The council meets once a month.

- City Hall, 133 South Washington Street
- U.S. Post Office, 308 East Main Street

== Education ==
The community is served by Flinthills USD 492 public school district. The Flinthills High School mascot is Flinthills Mustangs.

Cassoday High School was closed through school unification. The Cassoday High School mascot was Cassoday Longhorns.

== Media ==
=== Print ===
- The El Dorado Times, regional newspaper from El Dorado.

== Infrastructure ==
=== Transportation ===
K-177 Highway and Southern Transcon main line of BNSF Railway both go through Matfield Green, while the Kansas Turnpike toll road passes immediately north of the city with a toll plaza connected to Cassoday.

=== Utilities ===
- Internet
  - Wired is provided by Wheat State Telephone (FTTH, DSL and DialUp).
  - Satellite Internet is provided by HughesNet, StarBand, WildBlue.
- TV
  - Satellite TV is provided by DirecTV, Dish Network.
  - Free over-the-air ATSC digital TV.
- Telephone
  - Landline is provided by Wheat State Telephone.
- Electricity
  - City is provided by Westar Energy.
  - Rural is provided by Westar Energy or Butler REC
- Gas
  - Service is provided by City of Cassoday.
- Water is provided by City of Cassoday.
  - City is provided by City of Cassoday.
  - Rural is provided by Butler County RWD #3.
- Sewer
  - Service is provided by City of Cassoday.
- Trash
  - Service is provided by City of Cassoday.

=== Fox Lake ===
- Rural utilities:
  - Water, sewer, and gas provided by City of Cassoday.

== See also ==
- Sycamore Township, Butler County, Kansas (location of Cassoday)
