= Kutch, Colorado =

Unincorporated community in Elbert County, CO, USA

Coordinates: 38°54′38″N 103°52′10″W

Kutch is an unincorporated community in Elbert County, in the U.S. state of Colorado.

== History ==
A post office called Kutch was established in 1905, and remained in operation until 1971. The community was named after Ira Kutch, a local rancher.
