= Hayes, South Dakota =

Hayes
- Unincorporated community
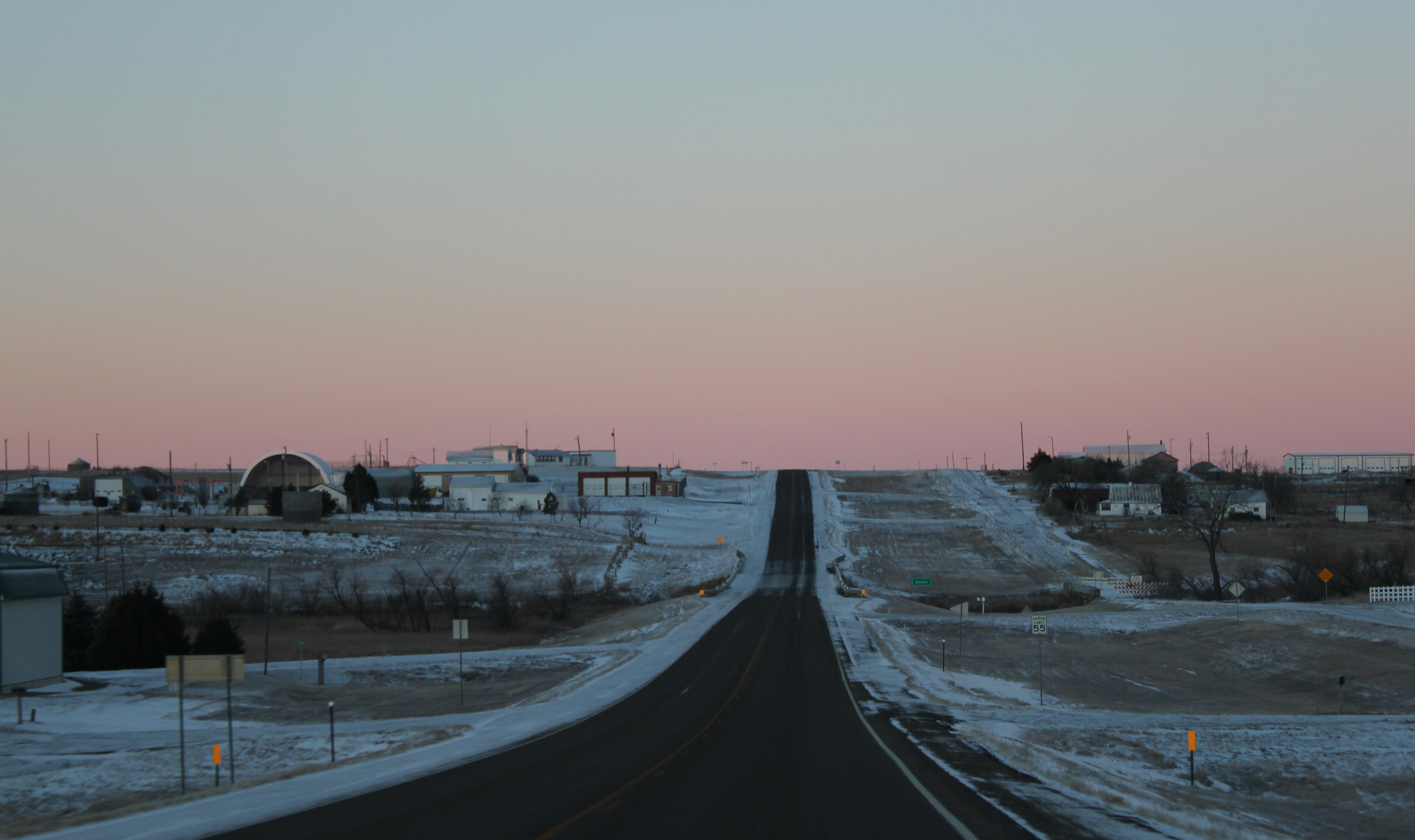
- A view of Hayes while traveling west on Highway 14.

- Location within the state of South Dakota Hayes (the United States)
- Coordinates: 44°22′13″N 101°01′18″W
- Country: United States
- State: South Dakota
- County: Stanley
- Elevation: 2,015 ft (614 m)
- Time zone: UTC-6 (Central (CST))
  - Summer (DST): UTC-5 (CDT)
- ZIP codes: 57537
- GNIS feature ID: 1255484

Hayes is an unincorporated community in Stanley County, South Dakota, United States. It is also a part of the Pierre, South Dakota Micropolitan Statistical Area.

The community's name honors John and William Hayes, early settlers.
