= Rosalia, Kansas =

Unincorporated community in Kansas, US

- Unincorporated community and CDP
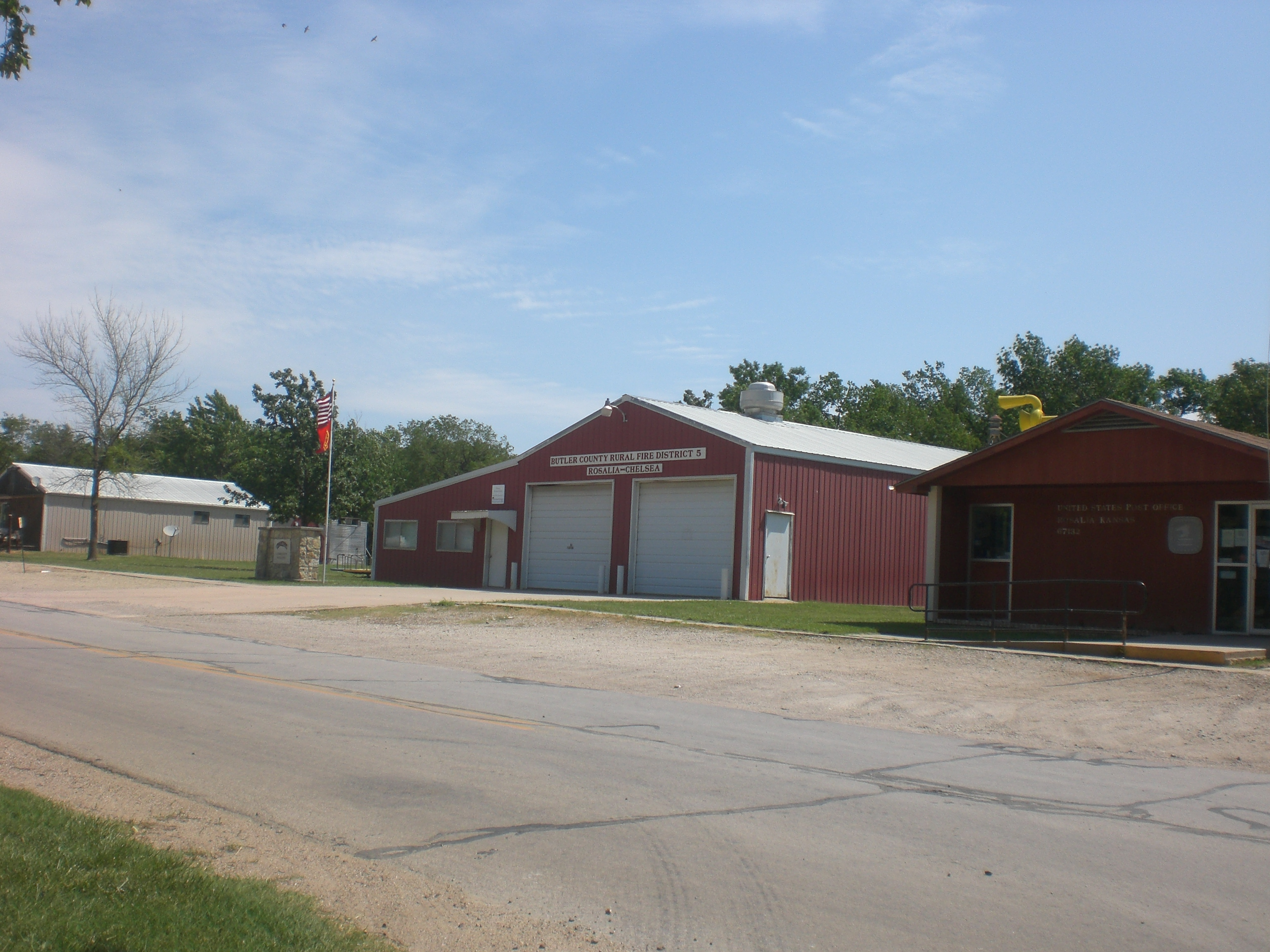
- Post office, fire station, ACA Allertor (2012)

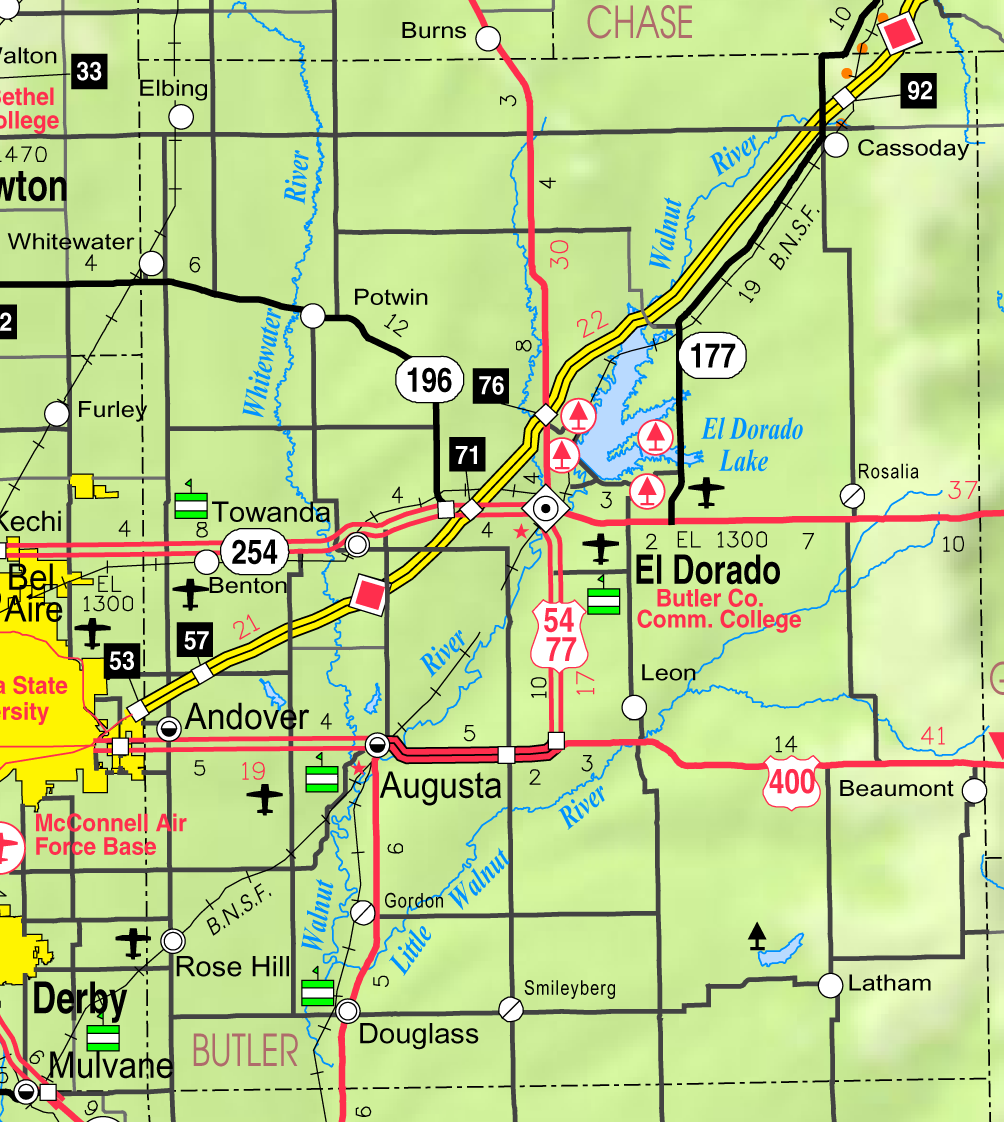
- KDOT map of Butler County (legend)

- Location within Kansas Location within the United States
- Coordinates: 37°48′57″N 96°37′14″W
- Country: United States
- State: Kansas
- County: Butler
- Platted: 1883
- Elevation: 1,499 ft (457 m)

Population (2020)
  - Total: 149
- Time zone: UTC-6 (CST)
  - Summer (DST): UTC-5 (CDT)
- ZIP Code: 67132
- Area code: 620
- FIPS code: 20-61100
- GNIS ID: 2629173

Rosalia is an unincorporated community and census-designated place (CDP) in Butler County, Kansas, United States. As of the 2020 census, the population was 149. It is located approximately 12 miles (19 km) east of El Dorado.

== History ==
Rosalia was platted in 1883. The town was named by its first postmaster for his wife.

In 2014 and 2018, the Symphony In The Flint Hills, an outdoor symphony music event, was held a few miles northeast of Rosalia. In 2014, the attendance was over 7000 people.

== Geography ==
Rosalia is located at 37°48′55″N 96°37′11″W (37.8152985, -96.6197416), in the scenic Flint Hills, roughly 12 miles (19 km) east of El Dorado.

=== Climate ===
The climate in this area is characterized by hot, humid summers and generally mild to cool winters. According to the Köppen Climate Classification system, Rosalia has a humid subtropical climate, abbreviated "Cfa" on climate maps.

== Demographics ==
Historical population
Census	Pop.	Note	%±
2010	171		—
2020	149		−12.9%
U.S. Decennial Census

== Government ==
Rosalia has a post office with ZIP Code 67132. The post office was established in 1870.

== Education ==
The community is served by Flinthills USD 492 public school district. The Flinthills High School mascot is the Mustangs.
